= Nawazuddin Siddiqui filmography =

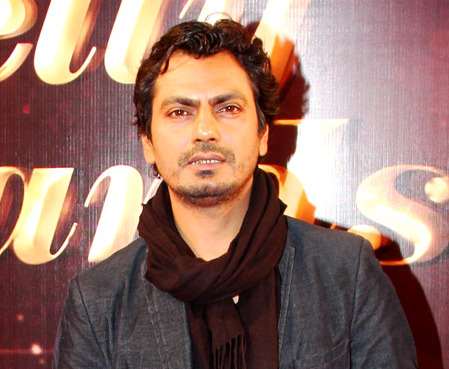
Siddiqui in 2014

Nawazuddin Siddiqui is an Indian actor known for his work in Hindi cinema. He is an alumnus of the National School of Drama. Siddiqui's feature film debut was alongside director Prashant Bhargava in Patang (2012), and his performance was appreciated by cinema critic Roger Ebert. He also gained international recognition for his work with director Anurag Kashyap in Black Friday (2007), the Gangs of Wasseypur (2012) duology, and Raman Raghav 2.0.

Siddiqui is best known for his roles in The Lunchbox (2013), Manto (2018), and Raman Raghav 2.0. He is the only actor in the world to have eight films officially selected and screened at the Film Festival Junction.

The actor continues to take time out from his filming schedule to farm in his native Uttar Pradesh. He has starred in two Emmy-nominated series, Sacred Games (2019) and the British McMafia.

== Filmography ==
Key
†	Denotes films that have not yet been released

=== Film ===
List of Nawazuddin Siddiqui film credits
Year	Title	Role	Notes
1999	Sarfarosh	Terrorist / Informer	
1999	Shool	Waiter	
2000	Jungle	Khabri (messenger)	
2000	Dr. Babasaheb Ambedkar	Leader	
2003	The Bypass	First bandit	
2003	Mudda – The Issue		
2003	Munna Bhai M.B.B.S.	Pickpocketer	
2006	Family	Nawaz	
2007	Aaja Nachle	Dhan Kuber	
2007	Ek Chalis Ki Last Local	Ponnappa's brother	
2007	Manorama Six Feet Under	Local goon	
2007	Black Friday	Asgar Mukadam	
2008	Black & White	Tahir Tayyabuddin	
2009	Firaaq	Hanif	
2009	New York	Zilgai	
2009	Dev.D	Singer at wedding	Cameo
2010	Peepli Live	Rakesh Kapoor	
2011	Dekh Indian Circus	Jethu	
2012	Kahaani	IB Officer A. Khan	
2012	Patang	Chakkku	First lead role
2012	Paan Singh Tomar	Gopi	
2012	Gangs of Wasseypur – Part 1	Faizal Khan	
2012	Gangs of Wasseypur – Part 2	Faizal Khan	
2012	Chittagong	Nirmal Sen	
2012	Talaash: The Answer Lies Within	Taimur	
2012	Miss Lovely	Sonu Duggal	
2013	Aatma - Feel It Around You	Abhay	
2013	Bombay Talkies	Purandar	
2013	Shorts	Unnamed	
2013	Liar's Dice	Nawazuddin	
2013	Monsoon Shootout	Shiva	
2013	The Lunchbox	Shaikh	
2013	Anwar Ka Ajab Kissa	Anwar	
2014	Kick	Shiv Gajra	
2015	Lateef	Lateef	
2015	Badlapur	Liak	
2015	Bajrangi Bhaijaan	Chand Nawab	
2015	Manjhi – The Mountain Man	Dashrath Manjhi	
2016	Raman Raghav 2.0	Ramanna	
2016	Te3n	Father Martin Das	
2016	Lion	Rama	
2016	Freaky Ali	Ali	
2017	Haraamkhor	Shyam	
2017	Raees	SP Jaideep Ambalal Majmudar	
2017	In Defence of Freedom	Saadat Hasan Manto	Short film
2017	Mom	Daya Shankar "DK" Kapoor	
2017	Munna Michael	Mahinder Fauji	
2017	Babumoshai Bandookbaaz	Babu Bihari	
2017	Carbon: The Story of Tomorrow	Man from Mars	Short film
2018	Mukkabaaz	Himself	Cameo
2018	Genius	Samar Khan	
2018	Manto	Saadat Hasan Manto	
2019	Petta	Singaar Singh / Singaram	Tamil film
2019	Thackeray	Bal Thackeray	
2019	Photograph	Rafiullah / 'Rafi'	
2019	Housefull 4	Ramsey Baba	
2019	Roam Rome Mein	Raj	
2019	Motichoor Chaknachoor	Pushpender Tyagi	
2020	Ghoomketu	Ghoomketu	
2020	Raat Akeli Hai	Jatil Yadav	
2020	Serious Men	Ayyan Mani	
2021	No Land's Man	Naveen / Sameer	Bangladeshi film
2022	Heropanti 2	Laila Saran	
2023	Afwaah	Rahab Ahmed	
2023	Jogira Sara Ra Ra	Jogi Pratap	
2023	Tiku Weds Sheru	Shiraz "Sheru" Khan Afghani	
2023	Haddi	Haddi	
2024	Saindhav	Vikas Malik	Telugu film
2024	Rautu Ka Raaz	Deepak Negi	
2024	Adbhut	Detective Gajraj Awasthy	
2025	Costao	Costao Fernandes	
2025	Thamma	Yakshasan	
2025	Main Actor Nahin Hoon	Adnan Baig	
2025	Raat Akeli Hai: The Bansal Murders	Inspector Jatil Yadav	Netflix film
2027	Section 108 †	D.C.P Vijay Khanna	Post-production
2027	Noorani Chehra †	Brigadier Veerendra "Veer" Chauhan, Agent B.S.F, D.I.A	Completed
2027	Sangeen †	D.C.P Dev Prasad	Post-production
2027	Tumbad 2 †		Post-production.
2027	The Great Escape Faraar †	Aman Verma	Post-production

=== Television ===
List of Nawazuddin Siddiqui web series credits
Year	Title	Role	Notes	Ref.
2001	CID	Alex	Episode: "The Case of the Elusive Killer"	
2019	Thriller Factory	Tridev	Audio series	
2018	McMafia	Dilly Mahmood	2 episodes	
2018–2019	Sacred Games	Ganesh Gaitonde	16 episodes	
2026	Dr. Hassan	Dr. Hassan		

=== Music videos ===
List of Nawazuddin Siddiqui music video credits
Year	Title	Singer	Ref.
2021	"Baarish Ki Jaaye"	B Praak	
2023	"Yaar Ka Sataya Hua Hai"	B Praak	

=== Short film ===
Year	Work	Role	Network	Notes
2007	Salt 'N' Pepper			short film

== See also ==
- List of awards and nominations received by Nawazuddin Siddiqui
