= List of awards and nominations received by Nawazuddin Siddiqui =

Nawazuddin Siddiqui awards and nominations
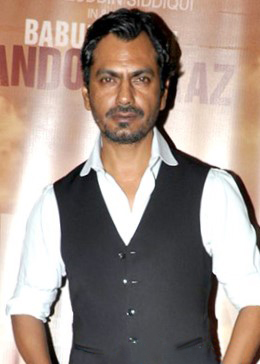
- Siddiqui in 2017
Awards and nominations
Award	Wins	Nominations

Totals (Note: Certain award groups do not simply award one winner. They acknowledge several different recipients, have runners-up, and have third place. Since this is a specific recognition and is different from losing an award, runner-up mentions are considered wins in this award tally. For simplification and to avoid errors, each award in this list has been presumed to have had a prior nomination.)
- Wins: 27
- Nominations: 17

Nawazuddin Siddiqui is an Indian actor known for his work in Hindi cinema. He is known for his roles in Gangs of Wasseypur (2012), The Lunchbox (2013), Raman Raghav 2.0 (2016), and Manto (2018), among others. As many as eight films in which he features have been screened at the Cannes Film Festival. He has won numerous awards, including a National Film Award, a Filmfare Award, and two Filmfare OTT Awards.

== Awards and nominations ==
=== Major associations ===
Year	Award	Category	Nominated work	Result	Ref.
2013	Asian Film Awards	Best Supporting Actor	Talaash	Won	
2016	Asia Pacific Screen Awards	High Commendation	Raman Raghav 2.0	Won	
2016	Asia Pacific Screen Awards	Best Performance by an Actor	Raman Raghav 2.0	Nominated	
2018	Asia Pacific Screen Awards	Best Performance by an Actor	Manto	Won	
2013	IIFA Awards	Best Supporting Actor	Gangs of Wasseypur & Talaash	Nominated	
2014	IIFA Awards	Best Supporting Actor	The Lunchbox	Nominated	
2016	IIFA Awards	Best Performance in a Negative Role	Badlapur	Nominated	
2016	IIFA Awards	Best Performance in a Comic Role	Bajrangi Bhaijaan	Nominated	
2016	IIFA Awards	Best Supporting Actor	Bajrangi Bhaijaan	Nominated	
2018	IIFA Awards	Best Supporting Actor	Mom	Won	
2021	International Emmy Awards	Best Actor	Serious Men	Nominated	
2013	Filmfare Awards	Best Supporting Actor	Talaash	Nominated	
2014	Filmfare Awards	Best Supporting Actor	The Lunchbox	Won	
2016	Filmfare Awards	Best Supporting Actor	Badlapur	Nominated	
2018	Filmfare Awards	Best Supporting Actor	Mom	Nominated	
2019	Filmfare Awards	Best Actor (Critics)	Manto	Nominated	
2020	Filmfare Awards	Best Actor (Critics)	Photograph	Nominated	
2020	Filmfare OTT Awards	Best Actor in a Web Original Film	Raat Akeli Hai	Won	
2021	Filmfare OTT Awards	Best Actor in a Web Original Film	Serious Men	Won	
2012	National Film Awards	Special Jury Award	Talaash, Kahaani, Gangs of Wasseypur, Dekh Indian Circus	Won	
2013	Producers Guild Film Awards	Best Actor in a Supporting Role	The Lunchbox	Won	
2016	Producers Guild Film Awards	Best Actor in a Supporting Role	Bajrangi Bhaijaan	Won	
2016	Producers Guild Film Awards	Best Actor in a Negative Role	Badlapur	Won	
2013	Screen Awards	Best Supporting Actor	Talaash	Won	
2016	Screen Awards	Best Supporting Actor	Bajrangi Bhaijaan	Won	
2017	Screen Awards	Best Comedian	Freaky Ali	Nominated	
2017	Screen Awards	Best Actor (Critics)	Raman Raghav 2.0	Nominated	
2018	Screen Awards	Best Actor (Critics)	Haraamkhor	Nominated	
2018	Screen Awards	Best Supporting Actor	Raees	Won	
2013	Zee Cine Awards	Best Actor in a Supporting Role – Male	Talaash	Won	
2014	Zee Cine Awards	Best Actor in a Supporting Role – Male	The Lunchbox	Nominated	
2016	Zee Cine Awards	Best Performance in a Negative Role	Badlapur	Won	
2016	Zee Cine Awards	Best Actor in a Comic Role	Bajrangi Bhaijaan	Won	

=== Film festival awards ===
Year	Festival	Category	Nominated work	Result	Ref.
2012	New York Indian Film Festival	Best Actor	Dekh Indian Circus	Won	
2013	Asia Pacific Film Festival	Best Supporting Actor	The Lunchbox	Won	
2014	Chicago South Asian Film Festival	Outstanding Achievement in Cinema	—N/a	Won	
2017	New York Indian Film Festival	Best Actor	Haraamkhor	Won	
2019	Asian Film Talent Award (SIFF)	Lesley Ho Asian Film Talent	Sacred Games	Won	
2019	Cardiff International Film festival	Golden Dragon Award for Excellence in Cinema	—N/a	Won	
2025	New York Indian Film Festival	Best Actor	Main Actor Nahin Hoon	Won	

=== Other awards ===
Year	Award	Category	Nominated work	Result	Ref.
2012	GQ Men of the Year Awards	Breakthrough Personality of the Year	—N/a	Won	
2013	Stardust Awards	Best Supporting Actor	Kahaani	Won	
2018	GQ Men of the Year Awards	Actor of the Year	Manto	Won	
2018	Indian Television Academy Awards	Best Actor – Web Series	Sacred Games	Nominated	
2018	iReel Awards	Best Actor (Drama)	Sacred Games	Won	

== See also ==
- Nawazuddin Siddiqui filmography
- List of accolades received by Kahaani
