= Four Rivers Six Ranges (film) =

2025 Indian historical drama film

- Directed by: Shenpenn Khymsar
- Written by: Shenpenn Khymsar
- Based on: Flight at the Cuckoo's Behest by Dorjee Wangdi Dewatshang
- Produced by: Shenpenn Khymsar; Dorjee Wangdi Dewatshang
- Starring: Thupten Chukhatsang; Tashi Kalden; Tenzin Dhondup; Thupten Chukatsang; Rigzin Phurpatsang
- Music by: Shenpenn Khymsar; Rohit Shakya
- Release date: 1 February 2025; (Rotterdam)
- Running time: 132 minutes
- Country: India
- Language: English

Four Rivers Six Ranges is a 2025 Indian historical drama film written, composed, produced and directed by Shenpenn Khymsar. The film is based on Dorjee Wangdi Dewatshang's book Flight at the Cuckoo's Behest and depicts the 1958–59 Tibetan resistance against Chinese forces and the escape of the 14th Dalai Lama from Tibet to India. It stars Thupten Chukhatsang, Tashi Kalden, Tenzin Dhondup, Thupten Chukatsang and Rigzin Phurpatsang. Nawazuddin Siddiqui provides the Hindi voiceover narration for the Indian release. The film premiered at the International Film Festival Rotterdam on 1 February 2025 and Hindi version of the film is scheduled for theatrical release in India on 11 September 2026.

== Plot ==
Set during the 1958–59 Tibetan resistance, the film follows Kunga Samten and Commander Gonpo Tashi Andrugtsang as they become involved in the Chushi Gangdruk resistance. The group is formed from traders, monks and other Tibetans who take part in armed resistance against Chinese forces. Following the 1959 uprising in Lhasa, members of the group become involved in protecting the 14th Dalai Lama during his journey from Tibet towards India. The story is based on Dorjee Wangdi Dewatshang's Flight at the Cuckoo's Behest.

== Cast ==
- Thupten Chukhatsang as Kunga Samten
- Tashi Kalden
- Tenzin Dhondup
- Thupten Chukatsang
- Rigzin Phurpatsang
- Nawazuddin Siddiqui as Hindi narrator (voiceover)

== Production ==
=== Development ===
Shenpenn Khymsar, a self-taught filmmaker and composer, spent approximately 12 years developing the film. He conducted research for the project, including meetings with elderly members of the resistance group and their families. Khymsar has said that his maternal grandfather participated in the 1959 uprising.

=== Filming ===
The film was shot in the Mustang region of Nepal at elevations exceeding 15,000 feet. Principal photography was completed in 19 days, and the production had an estimated budget of ₹6 crore. Khymsar served as writer, composer, producer and action director. To obtain permission to film in Mustang, the production initially submitted a screenplay titled The Himalayan Robinhood to Nepalese authorities before filming Four Rivers Six Ranges. According to a source cited in the report, the film was subsequently banned in Nepal. Khymsar also described the production as involving difficult filming conditions in the mountainous region.

=== Music ===
Khymsar composed the music with Rohit Shakya. The score incorporates orchestral music with Tibetan musical elements, including horns, strings and percussion. The film received the Best Soundtrack award for a feature film at the Julien Dubuque International Film Festival in 2025.

== Release ==
The film was selected for the International Film Festival of India (IFFI) in Goa but was withdrawn from the festival lineup following a request from the Ministry of External Affairs, according to Khymsar. A special screening was held in Dharamshala during celebrations for the 90th birthday of the 14th Dalai Lama, which was attended by Richard Gere. The Hindi version, featuring narration by Nawazuddin Siddiqui, is scheduled for theatrical release in India on 11 September 2026.

== Reception ==
China Global Television Network (CGTN), the international division of China Central Television, criticised the film's depiction of Tibetan history. In an opinion article, CGTN accused Khymsar of promoting separatism and described the film as a distortion of what it referred to as Xizang's history. The article disputed the film's portrayal of Tibet's political history and Khymsar's position on Tibet's relationship with China. In October 2026, Bollywood Hungama reported that the film had been cleared by the Central Board of Film Certification on 29 April 2026 with a U/A 13+ certificate, passed by the Examining Committee itself without being referred to the Revising Committee, and that it was released in Indian cinemas on 18 September 2026; the report contrasted this with the clearance difficulties faced by the Indian film Maatrubhumi, which depicts the 2020 India–China border conflict.
