= Ila Arun =

Indian actress and singer (born 1954)

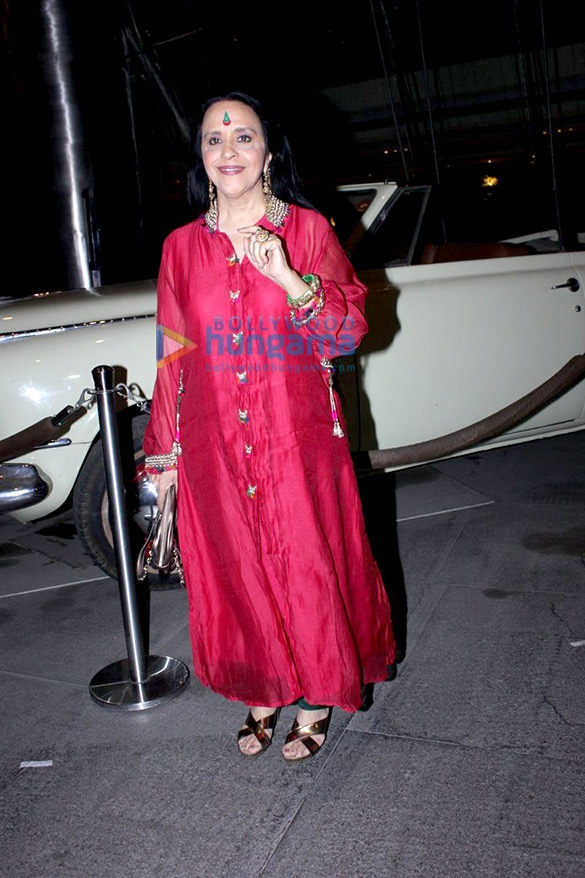
- Ila Arun in 2016

Background information
- Born: 15 March 1954 (age 72); Jodhpur, Rajasthan, India
- Genres: Indian film music, playback, classical, pop
- Occupations: Singer, actress
- Instruments: Vocalist
- Years active: 1979–present

Ila Arun is an Indian actress, TV personality and Rajasthani folk-pop singer known for her works in Hindi cinema, and Indian pop. She has appeared in many prominent Bollywood films such as Lamhe, Jodhaa Akbar, Shaadi Ke Side Effects and Begum Jaan.

== Personal life ==
Arun was born on 15 March 1954 in a Kanyakubja Brahmin family of Jodhpur in Rajasthan. She hails from Jaipur . She is the sister of Piyush Pandey and Prasoon Pandey. Her mother was Bhagwati Pandey. She is married to Arun Bajpayi. Ila Arun is the mother of Ishitta Arun.

== Playback singing ==
Arun has sung numerous film songs in Hindi and quite a few other Indian languages such as Tamil and Telugu. Her most famous film song to date has been "Choli Ke Peeche" sung along with Alka Yagnik for the film Khalnayak starring Madhuri Dixit, for which they won the Filmfare Award for Best Female Playback Singer. The song created controversy due to the inappropriate lyrics and Arun was told by certain people not to sing the song at her public performances. Another song which she is famous for is "Ghup Chup" from the film Karan Arjun. She also is well known for her song "Morni Baaga Ma Bole" accompanied with Lata Mangeshkar, in the movie Lamhe, starring Sridevi. She has lent her voice to the Tamil song "Muthu Muthu Mazhai", for the film Mr. Romeo, composed by A. R. Rahman. Her last noteworthy song was also with Rahman composed for the internationally acclaimed film Slumdog Millionaire, called "Ringa Ringa".

=== Singles/Albums ===
She has produced several successful singles such as "Vote for Ghagra". She also sang the promotional hit song Halla Bol for the Rajasthan Royals team in the Indian Premier League She hails from Rajasthan and sings Rajasthani songs in her albums and movies.

== Acting ==
Arun was first seen acting in Lifeline (Jeevanrekha) a Hindi TV serial on life of doctors, along with Tanvi Azmi on Doordarshan. She delivered an electrifying performance in the 2008 hit Jodhaa Akbar as Maham Anga, Akbar's shrewd wet nurse and political advisor. She has also acted in supporting roles in films such as China Gate, Chingari, Well Done Abba, Welcome to Sajjanpur, West is West and Ghatak. In Shaadi Ke Side Effects and Begum Jaan, she played a governess and a brothel member, respectively. In "Raat Akeli Hai", which is a Netflix movie and released on 31 July 2020, she has played the role of mother of the Hero "Nawazuddin Siddiqui" and correctly delivered the dialogues in local dialect.

Arun has been a part of the early years of Indian television Industry, acting in the 1980s Bharat Ek Khoj and Yatra. She also took on the role of Hansa Mehta, an independence activist who was part of the advisory committee of the constituent assembly, in Samvidhaan which is a TV mini-series based on the making of the Constitution of India.

== Discography ==
Album(s)	Notes
Vote for Ghagra	
Nigodi Kaisi Jawani Hai	
Main Ho Gayi Sawa Lakh Ki	
Banjaran	
Bombay Girl	
The Very Best of Ila	Compilation
Khichdi	
Haule Haule	
Mela	
Ila Arun Pop Hits	Compilation
Chhappan Chhuri	
Mare Hiwda Ma	
Nimri Nimoli	MTV Coke Studio (single)

== Filmography ==
=== As actress ===
Year	Film	Role	Director	Notes
1983	Ardh Satya	Sneha Bajpai	Govind Nihalani	
1983	Mandi	Kamli	Shyam Benegal	
1985	Trikal	Cook	Shyam Benegal	
1986	Jaal	Tara	Umesh Mehra	
1990	Police Public	Laxmi	Esmayeel Shroff	
1991	Lamhe	Folk dancer in the song "Chudiyan Khanak Gayee"	Yash Chopra	Also singer
1992	Suraj Ka Satvan Ghoda	Lily's mother	Shyam Benegal	
1994	Droh Kaal	Zeenat	Govind Nihalani	
1996	Ghatak	Mrs. Malti Sachdev	Rajkumar Santoshi	
1997	Auzaar	Herself	Sohail Khan	In the song "Apni To Ek Hi Life"
1998	China Gate	Mrs. Gopinath	Rajkumar Santoshi	
2005	Bose - The Forgotten Hero	Ranu	Shyam Benegal	
2006	Chingaari	Padmavati	Kalpana Lajmi	
2008	Jodhaa Akbar	Maham Anga	Ashutosh Gowariker	Nominated—IIFA Award for Best Supporting Actress; Nominated—Screen Award for Best Actor in a Negative Role
2008	Welcome to Sajjanpur	Ramsakhi Pannawali	Shyam Benegal	Nominated—Screen Award for Best Supporting Actress; Nominated—Producers Guild Film Award for Best Actress in a Supporting Role
2010	West Is West	Basheera Khan	Andy DeEmmony	British film
2010	Well Done Abba	Salma Ali	Shyam Benegal	
2010	Mirch	Kesar bai	Vinay Shukla	
2011	Aagaah: The Warning	Ramsharan's mother	Karan Razdan	
2012	Arjun: The Warrior Prince	Kunti (voice role)	Arnab Chaudhuri	Animated film
2014	Shaadi Ke Side Effects	Aunty	Saket Chaudhary	
2017	Begum Jaan	Amma	Srijit Mukherji	
2018	Thugs of Hindostan	Jaitumbi	Vijay Krishna Acharya	
2018	Manto	Jaddanbai	Nandita Das	
2020	Ghoomketu	Santo Bua	Pushpendra Nath Mishra	ZEE5 film
2020	Raat Akeli Hai	Mrs. Yadav	Honey Trehan	Netflix film
2020	Chhalaang	Usha Gehlot	Hansal Mehta	Amazon Prime Video film
2021	Sherni	Pawan's mother	Amit V. Masurkar	Amazon Prime Video film
2021	Aafat-E-Ishq	Bahuji	Indrajit Nattoji	ZEE5 Film
2022	Mister Mummy	Kavita	Shaad Ali	
2023	Haddi	Revathy Amma	Akshat Ajay Sharma	ZEE5 Film
2023	Aarya season 3	Nalini Sahiba	Ram Madhvani	Disney+Hotstar series
2024	Kuch Khattaa Ho Jaay		G. Ashok	
2025	Raat Akeli Hai: The Bansal Murders	Sarita Kumari	Honey Trehan	Netflix film
2026	Do Deewane Seher Mein		Ravi Udyawar	

=== As singer ===
"Payal Utaar Dungi" Film: Mohabbat ki Arzoo 1994 Music Director : Laxmikant Pyarelal

Year	Film	Song(s)	Music director	Notes
1985	Aitbaar	"Khali Peeli Pyar Se"	Bappi Lahiri	
1986	Jaal	"Raina Bawari Bhai Re"	Anu Malik	
1986	Ashiana	"Jawani Re" "Yaad Kyon Teri Mujhe Sataye"	Jagjit Singh	
1989	Batwara	"Ye Ishq Dunk Bichhua Ka, Are Isse Raam Bachaye"	Laxmikant-Pyarelal	
1991	Rukmavati Ki Haveli		Herself	
1991	Lamhe	"Chudiyan Khanak Gayee" "Megha Re Megha"	Shiv-Hari	
1993	Khalnayak	"Choli Ke Peeche Kya Hai (Female)"	Laxmikant-Pyarelal	Won—Filmfare Award for Best Female Playback Singer
1993	Khalnayak	"Nayak Nahi Khalnayak Hai Tu"	Laxmikant-Pyarelal	
1993	Bedardi	"Sun O Bedardi"	Laxmikant-Pyarelal	
1993	Dalaal	"Gutur Gutur"	Bappi Lahiri	
1994	Amaanat	"Din Mein Kehti Hai"	Bappi Lahiri	
1994	Naaraaz	"Aisa Tadpaya Mujhe Dil Bekarar Ne"	Anu Malik	
1994	Mohabbat Ki Arzoo	"Payal Utar Dungi"	Laxmikant Pyarelal	
1995	Diya Aur Toofan	"Kundi Dheere Se Khatkana"	Bappi Lahiri	
1995	Zakhmi Sipahi	"O Laila O Laila"	Rais Bhartiya	
	Karan Arjun	"Gupchup Gupchup"	Rajesh Roshan	
1996	Aatank	"Main Chhui Mui" "Meri Patli Kamar"	Laxmikant–Pyarelal	
1996	Smuggler	"Bin Barsaat Ke"	Bappi Lahiri	
1996	Mr. Romeo	"Muthu Muthu Mazhai" (original version) "Paas Aaja Baalam" (Hindi version)	A. R. Rahman	Tamil Film
	Bandish	"Main Ho Gayi Athra"	Anand-Milind	
1997	Tarazu	"Chal Ganne Ke Khet Mein"	Rajesh Roshan	
1997	Jeevan Yudh	"Kameez Meri Kaali"	Nadeem–Shravan	
1997	Auzaar	"Masti Ka Aalam Aaya Hai"	Anu Malik	
1998	Kaadhal Kavithai	"Thathom Thakathimi"	Ilaiyaraaja	Tamil film
1999	Bhopal Express	"Udan Khatola"	Shankar–Ehsaan–Loy	
1999	Jaanam Samjha Karo	"I Was Made For Loving You"	Anu Malik	
2000	Snegithiye	"Othayadi Padhayile"	Vidyasagar	Tamil Film
2003	Boom	"Boom"	Talvin Singh	
2004	Paisa Vasool	"Maine Saiyan Ki Demand"	Bapi–Tutul	
2010	Well Done Abba	"Meri bano hoshiyar"	Shantanu Moitra	Also lyricist
2010	Mirch	"Mora Saiyyan"	Monty Sharma	
2010	Raavan	"Kata Kata"	A. R. Rahman	
2012	Arjun: The Warrior Prince	"Kabhi Na Dekhe Hastinapur Mein"	Vishal–Shekhar	
2013	Deewana Main Deewana	"Kala Doriya"	Bappi Lahiri	
2024	Crew	"Ghagra"	Bharg-Rohit	
2024	Crew	"Choli"	Laxmikant-Pyarelal, Akshay-IP	
2025	Crazxy	"Goli Maar Bheje Mein"		Rap

=== As music director ===
- 1992 – Mujhse Dosti Karoge
- 1991 – Rukmavati Ki Haveli
- 1985 – Doongar Ro Bhed

=== Television appearances ===
Year	Show(s)	Role	Notes
1986	Yatra	Drama group member	
1988	Bharat Ek Khoj	Various characters	
1991	Lifeline (Jeevanrekha)	Doctor	
2005	Fame Gurukul	Head Mistress	
2014	Samvidhaan	Hansha Mehta	
2015	Coke Studio	Performer	
