= Indrajit Nattoji =

Indian film director

- Born: 5 June 1976 (age 50); Calcutta, West Bengal, India
- Occupation: Film director
- Spouse: Nandita Nattoji
- Website: https://blinkpictures.tv

Indrajit Nattoji (born 5 June 1976) is an Indian film director, artist, and producer known for his works in Bollywood, television, and advertising. Nattoji started his career in documentary filmmaking and then moved from television to advertising to be a feature filmmaker. He continues to be an ad filmmaker and runs his own film production company, Blink Pictures. Nattoji has made his directional debut Aagey Se Right (2009) which was produced by Ronnie Screwvala under the banner of UTV Spotboy, a subsidiary of UTV Motion Pictures. Indrajit has also directed a feature film titled Aafat-E-Ishq starring Neha Sharma, Ila Arun, Deepak Dobriyal, and Namit Das which is produced by Zee Studios.

== Early life ==
Indrajit Nattoji did his schooling in Campion School, Mumbai and graduated from the National Institute of Design (NID) located in Ahmedabad, Gujarat. At NID, he completed his MDes (Master of Design) in Communication Design with a specialization in Film and Graphic Design. After completing his graduation, he moved to New Delhi and eventually to Mumbai, to pursue his career as a film director.

== Career ==
After graduating from NID, Nattoji moved to New Delhi as a documentary filmmaker, where he extensively documented the aftermath of the 1993 earthquake in Latur. He then went on to join BITV, a news and current affairs channel, as promo director. Later he formed Watermark Films, an advertising production house in New Delhi, with two of his seniors- Dibakar Banerjee and Amitabh Roy from NID, post which he joined Channel V, Star Networks in Mumbai as writer and director of On-air Promos. He worked with Channel V for three years, from 1997 to 2000.

Nattoji started his ad-film production studio Blink Pictures in 2001. As the ad-film work grew, he expanded his company with a bigger production team in 2004. He has worked with some of the biggest names in the Industry, like Hrithik Roshan, John Abraham, Irrfan Khan, Prosenjit, Amrita Rao and Sri Lanka's talented star Bathiya & Santhush.

He has directed and produced more than 400 Television Commercials for renowned brands like Coca-Cola, Parle, Indian Oil, Sony, TVS, Airtel, and Levis and many others. Indrajit has directed and produced the launch anthem film for Rajasthan Royals- 'Halla Bol', which featured a track sung by Ila Arun. His international projects include TVCs for markets of USA, Kenya, UAE, and Sri Lanka. Indrajit has also been felicitated with many awards for his outstanding work in creative direction and film direction. He has conceived, directed, and produced several Broadcast Design and Channel Branding projects for Television Networks like Astro Malaysia, Zee and Star India. Besides Broadcast design and TVCs, Nattoji has conceived and directed several popular music videos for music companies like Zee Music, Times Music and Sony Music and for artists like Aagosh (Song- Paisa), Kashti (Song Parchaiyaan Featuring Kay Kay Menon) and Hai Re Hai Mera Ghoongta (remix by Leslie Lewis featuring Dipannita Sharma).

He made his first Hindi feature film as a director with Aagey se right (2009), which was produced by Ronnie Screwvala, under the banner of UTV Motion Pictures, starring Shreyas Talpade, Mahie Gill, Kay Kay Menon, Shenaz Treasurywala.

In 2014 he briefly shifted base to Malaysia on a short-term contract, where he was consulting for International Feature film projects with Double Vision Sdn Bhd, a reputed Malaysia-based film and television production company, as Executive Creative Director. In 2015 Nattoji conceived and created a visually striking animated graphic end title sequence as Creative Director (Title Design) for Dibakar Banerjee's film Detective Byomkesh Bakshy. The Title Design was based on the idea of an illustrated epilogue for the protagonist Byomkesh Bakshy.

In May 2020, Indrajit created a hand-painted animated music video for the track Rangi Saari by Kavita Seth and Kanishk Seth; who described it as a six-month solo project involving thousands of hand-painted frames. In April 2022, Rangi Saari clocked more than 10 million organic YouTube views.

He continues to run Blink Pictures and has conceived, directed, and produced two large-format film installations for the Indian Music Experience (IME), India's first experiential museum on Indian music in Bengaluru.

== Filmography ==
=== Director ===
Year	Film	Director	Writer	Producer	Note(s)
2002	Paisa- Music Video	Yes	Yes	Yes	Director
2009	Aagey Se Right	Yes	Yes	No	Director Debut
2019	IME Nadam (Sound)- Short Film	Yes	Yes	Yes	Director/Animation Artist
2020	Rangi Saari- Music Video	Yes	Yes	Yes	Director/Animation Artist
2022	Aafat-E-Ishq	Yes	Yes	No	Director

== As an Artist ==
Artist Indrajit Nattoji presented a unique collection of paintings at the ICCR, Kolkata, on 18–20 May 2018. It was called, "Tagore in Shorthand" that delves into Kobi Guru's literary works through handwriting his poems and songs in his image, using ink and paint on paper. Each artwork showcases one of Tagore's literary works written in his image. Portraits range from Tagore as a young man to his later years – an artist's tribute to Rabindranath Tagore in handwritten drawing style. Director and actor Parambrata Chattopadhyay were present at the event with Maestro Bickram Ghosh, Artist Wassim Kapoor, politician, and industrialist Baishali Dalmiya, among others, on day one.

== Recognition and awards ==
While at Channel V Indrajit Nattoji got awarded and facilitated for the Razorfish Rocket Award for Rising Talent 2000, Asia. He also received numerous Advertising Club and Promax Awards (Asia and Worldwide) awards for his work in Broadcast design and Advertising films and continues to do so to date. One of the film installations, Nadam, created by Indrajit for the Indian Music Experience Museum, has won awards at several international film festivals, including Indie Short Fest (Los Angeles International Film Festival), Tokyo Short Film Festival and the 12th Dadasaheb Film Festival, 2022.

Indrajit's Nadam (Sound) along with his animated music video, Rangi Saari (Colours of Love) was officially selected at the Mumbai International Film Festival.
