= Tikli and Laxmi Bomb =

- Directed by: Aditya Kripalani
- Written by: Aditya Kripalani
- Story by: Aditya Kripalani
- Music by: Laxmi Bomb; Marcus Corbett; Dhanashree Ganatra; Akshay Gidwani; Aditya Kripalani; Ganesh Talkies
- Release date: 2018
- Running time: 150 minutes
- Country: India
- Language: Hindi

Tikli and Laxmi Bomb is an Indian film released on Netflix, directed by Aditya Kripalani based on revolution in the sex trade, the story of which revolves around two sex workers in Mumbai, India who decide to attain autonomy in their profession by running a small part of the sex trade by women and for women.

== Plot ==
Laxmi Malwankar is a sex worker in Mumbai who takes a shot at S.V. street and has been a piece of Mumbai's flourishing sex exchange for almost two decades. She's 40, tainted and at some level has a profound seeded dedication towards Mhatre, the pimp, who deals with every one of the young ladies on that road. Putul, 22, hails from Bangladesh and Mhatre the pimp has conveyed her to Laxmi to be instructed the ropes. Putul, defiant as she seems to be, is brimming with inquiries concerning how this framework functions and why every one of the men in this arrangement of prostitution pronounce to give security however then wind up getting to be predators themselves from whom at that point there is no assurance. For Laxmi this is the manner by which the world works, it is a man controlled society and her solitary counsel to Putul is to rapidly adjust to the methods for this universe of men. After some time, Putul can persuade Laxmi that things require evolving. Laxmi however still not persuaded enough to take it up as her own motivation, chooses to remain by Putul because of a grouping of certain occasions that happen in the city.

Together they get the chance to be known as Tikli and Laxmi Bomb and begin off this small scale upheaval in which they set up a framework for ladies, keep running by ladies, in which the last client is a man however the ladies run it the manner in which they need and in relatively add up to control. How far would they say they are ready to go in this undertaking? How tall is their new association ready to develop before it turns out to be too enormous a risk for man centric society to give it a chance to exist? It is safe to say that they are ready to roll out an improvement that is perpetual or another tiny blip on the radar?

Does Laxmi, who at first just stands behind Putul's motivation, take this up as her own motivation soon enough, understanding that ladies of the world are sisters in what they experience and their capacity lies in realizing that? Living in what could well be the strata of society that is most mistreated by man centric society, as it doesn't even authoritatively exist in India, can these young ladies fashion another way for sex specialists in the nation? Or on the other hand do they rise just to at last be overwhelmed by a claustrophobic man's reality?

== Cast ==
- Vibhawari Deshpande
- Chitrangada Satarupa
- Ajay Mahendru
- Saharsh Kumar Shukla
- Kamil Shaikh
- Suchitra Pillai

== Awards ==
Award	Year	Status	Category
London Asian Film Festival	2018	Won	Best Film
Berlin Independent Film Festival, DE	2018	Won	Best Feature Film
