= Rasika Shekar =

- Born: 1989 April 4
- Origin: India
- Genres: Carnatic, Classical Indian, Fusion World, Contemporary, Jazz, Bollywood, Ghazals
- Occupations: Singer, flautist
- Years active: 2012–present

Rasika Shekar is a singer, flautist and composer. She plays the Indian bamboo flute.

== Personal life ==
Rasika was born in Dubai and raised in New Jersey, USA. She is trained in Carnatic and Hindustani classical music, initially learning Carnatic vocals from her aunt Vaishali Shankar and violin from her grandmother Gowri Ramakrishnan. She started playing Carnatic flute at the age of 14. Rasika earned a bachelor's degree in chemical engineering from Rutgers University but soon after graduating, started spending more time in India to further her studies in Indian classical music and perform there.

== Career ==
Marking the beginning of her career, Rasika was invited to tour with ghazal legend Ustad Ghulam Ali Khan as a vocalist where she performed a repertoire of ghazals. She made her Bollywood playback singing debut when composers Shankar–Ehsaan–Loy offered her the opportunity to sing for the film Dekh Indian Circus. She then started performing with the trio in their Bollywood live concerts. Rasika's work in Bollywood playback singing has been featured in films 2 States, Kill Dil, Katti Batti, Love Games. As a flautist, she started performing solo Carnatic flute concerts from a young age and continued on in the United States, Dubai, Chennai and Mumbai. She was featured as a flautist on MTV's Coke Studio Season 2 in Ehsaan and Loy's production single Man Patang. Rasika rose to popularity after a video of her performing with Shankar Mahadevan. She has performed in the US, India, Mauritius, Spain and Singapore.

== Education ==
Rasika graduated with a Bachelor's Degree in chemical engineering from Rutgers University. She also studied jazz and flamenco music at Berklee College of Music, where she attained her master's degree in performance.

== Discography ==
Playback Singing – Bollywood

- Song: Lambuda Kakka, Film: Dekh Indian Circus, Composer: Shankar–Ehsaan–Loy, Year: 2012
- Song: Man Patang Man Malang (flautist), Film: MTV Coke Studio Season 2, Composer: Ehsaan & Loy, Year: 2012
- Song: Hullaa Re, Film: 2 States, Composer: Shankar–Ehsaan–Loy, Year: 2014
- Song: Daiyaa Maiyaa, Film: Kill Dil, Composer: Shankar–Ehsaan–Loy, Year: 2014
- Song: Sau Aasoon, Film: Katti Batti, Composer: Shankar–Ehsaan–Loy, Year: 2015
- Song: Awargi, Film: Love Games, Composer: Sangeeth Siddharth, Year: 2016
