= Chitrangada Satarupa =

Indian actress

- Born: Chitrangada Chakraborty; 20 August 1989 (age 36); Kolkata, West Bengal, India
- Occupation: Actress
- Years active: 2012–present
- Parents: Utpalendu Chakrabarty (father); Satarupa Sanyal (mother)
- Relatives: Ritabhari Chakraborty (sister)

Chitrangada Satarupa is an Indian actress who appears predominantly in Hindi and Bengali cinema. She is known for starring in the critically acclaimed films Tikli and Laxmi Bomb (2017), Tottaa Pataaka Item Maal (2018) and Devi Aur Hero (2019).

== Early and personal life ==
Chitrangada Satarupa was born as Chitrangada Chakraborty on 19 August to Satarupa Sanyal and Utpalendu Chakrabarty in Kolkata, West Bengal. She studied mass communications at St. Xavier's College, Kolkata. She then moved to Mumbai, joined the theater, and did plays for years. Her first play was Colorblind of which Kalki Koechlin was also a part. She married her longtime boyfriend, Sambit Chatterjee.

== Career ==
Chitrangada debuted in Bengali films with Antore Bahire (2012). She then appeared in the television series Stories by Rabindranath Tagore (2015), directed by Anurag Basu and based on the novels and short stories of Rabindranath Tagore. She played Mrinmayi, a gamine and flamboyant young woman who struggles with the lack of choice women have in her society. She next starred in the critically acclaimed Tikli and Laxmi Bomb (2017), directed by Aditya Kripalani and based on his novel of the same name. She received praise for her performance, and the film was showcased at several film festivals. The film won best feature at the London Asian Film Festival 2018 and the Berlin Independent Film Festival 2018.

She then appeared in Bikas Mishra's Pagla Ghoda (2017) and starred in Aditya Kripalani's Tottaa Pataaka Item Maal (2018) which met with critical acclaim. She then played the role of Titli in Ahare Mon (2018) The Film companion cited the film as the best Bengali film of the year.

In 2019, she appeared in Shantilal O Projapoti Rohoshyo, Devi Aur Hero, directed by Aditya Kripalani. She also appeared in the bilingual medical mystery web series adapted from Indranil Sanyal's novel Karkat Kranti, Guilty Minds and Mariam (2023).

== Filmography ==
Year	Title	Role	Language	Notes	Ref
2012	Antore Bahire	Shruti	Bengali		
2013	The Last Poem		Bengali		
2015	Stories by Rabindranath Tagore	Mrinmoyee	Bengali	Epic TV Series	
2017	Tikli and Laxmi Bomb	Tikli	Hindi		
2017	Pagla Ghoda	Mili	Hindi	TV Movie	
2018	Tottaa Pataaka Item Maal	Chitra Joardar	Hindi		
2018	Ahare Mon	Titli	Bengali		
2019	Shantilal O Projapoti Rohoshyo	Candy	Bengali		
2019	Devi Aur Hero	Kaali Ghosh	Hindi		
2019	Sakharam B	Champa	Hindi		
2019	Chokher Bali	Ashalatha	Hindi	TV Movie	
2020	The Daughter		Hindi	Short	
2020	Karkat Rogue	Beas Chatterjee	Hindi, Bengali	Web series (8 Episodes )	
2022	Guilty Minds	Sunanda Bose	Hindi	Web series (10 Episodes)	
2022	Mukti	Prava	Bengali	Web Series	
2023	Saarey Shaitrish		Bengali	Web Series	
2023	Mariam	Mariam	Hindi		
