= Dhanashree Deshpande-Ganatra =

Indian singer, poet, and musician

Dhanashree Deshpande-Ganatra (born 2 February 1970, in Khopoli) is an Indian singer, poet, and music producer, best known for her musical variety show You, Me and Chai (2013), her poetry book Dhanu Dnyaniyachi (2016), and her music production on the Netflix film Tikli and Laxmi Bomb (2017).
