= I Love You (2023 film) =

2023 film directed by Nikhil Mahajan

- Official release poster
- Directed by: Nikhil Mahajan
- Written by: Nikhil Mahajan
- Produced by: Gaurav Bose; Jyoti Deshpande; Sunir Khetarpal
- Starring: Pavail Gulati; Rakul Preet Singh; Akshay Oberoi
- Cinematography: Cameron Bryson
- Edited by: Abhijit Deshpande
- Music by: Songs: Shor Police; Gaurav Chatterji; Background Score: Clinton Cerejo
- Production companies: Jio Studios; Athena Production
- Distributed by: JioCinema
- Release date: 16 June 2023
- Running time: 95 minutes
- Country: India
- Language: Hindi

I Love You is a 2023 Indian Hindi-language romantic thriller film written and directed by Nikhil Mahajan. Produced under the banner of Jio Studios, it features Pavail Gulati, Rakul Preet Singh and Akshay Oberoi. An unofficial remake of the 2007 American horror drama P2, it was released for streaming on 16 June 2023 in JioCinema to mixed reviews from critics.

== Cast ==
- Pavail Gulati as Rakesh "R.O." Oberoi
- Rakul Preet Singh as Satya Prabhakar
  - Elisha Jeetu Jawrani as Young Satya
- Akshay Oberoi as Vishal Kapoor
- Kiran Kumar as Anthony
- Prateek Pachori as Watchman
- Sharad Jadhav as Driver Mishra Ji
- Shivani Singh as Neha; Satya's friend

== Production ==
The film was announced by Jio Studios featuring Pavail Gulati, Rakul Preet Singh, Akshay Oberoi. The principal photography of the film started in 2022 and was wrapped in 2023.

== Release ==
The film digitally premiered on 16 June 2023 on JioCinema. Rakul Preet Singh promoted the film on Bigg Boss OTT 2.

== Soundtrack ==
I Love You

Soundtrack album by Shor Police and Gaurav Chatterji
- Released: 16 June 2023
- Genre: Feature film soundtrack
- Length: 14:06
- Language: Hindi
- Label: Saregama

The film's music is composed by Shor Police and Gaurav Chatterji.

Track listing
No.	Title	Lyrics	Music	Singer(s)	Length
1.	"Hai Tu"	Ginny Diwan	Gaurav Chatterji	Armaan Malik	3:08
2.	"Yeh Nazar"	Hussain Haidry	Shor Police	Adnan Sami	3:50
3.	"Salamat Rahe"	Hussain Haidry	Shor Police	Bhoomi Trivedi	3:23
4.	"Rihaa Rihaa"	Hussain Haidry	Shor Police	Shalmali Kholgade	3:45
Total length:					14:06

== Reception ==
Prateek Sur of Outlook India gave the series 1/5 stars. Namrata Thakker of Rediff.com rated the series 1/5 stars. Aishwarya Vasudevan of OTT Play rated the series 1.5/5 stars. Archika Khurana of The Times of India rated 3 out of 5 stars.

The series was reviewed by Firstpost, Hindustan Times and The Hindu.
