= Rakkhosh (2019 film) =

- Directed by: Abhijit Kokate, Srivinay Salian
- Written by: Srivinay Salian
- Produced by: Santosh Deshpande; Sayali Deshpande
- Starring: Sanjay Mishra; Tannishtha Chatterjee; Priyanka Bose; Barun Chanda
- Cinematography: Basile Pierrat
- Edited by: Dinesh Gopal Poojari
- Music by: Ashim Kemson
- Production company: SD Motion Pictures Pvt Ltd
- Distributed by: Netflix
- Release date: 20 June 2019
- Country: India
- Language: Hindi

Rakkhosh (lit. 'Rakshasa'; transl. Demon) is a 2019 Indian Hindi-language psychological thriller drama film where the camera is the lead character of the film. It is a first-person POV of a schizophrenic person. The film is an adaptation of a Marathi short story titled "Patient 302", by late Shri Narayan Dharap, who is a well-known writer in Marathi Literature in horror genre.

Rakkhosh bagged the "Special Jury Award for Best Director in Hindi Film" at the Rajasthan International Film Festival, that took place in Jaipur between 19 and 23 January 2019.

== Plot ==
The film explores the horrors and fantasies of a patient trapped in a mental asylum.

Birsa is a mental patient with a history of abuse from his father and elder brother. He's sent to mental asylum from where he draws a parallel between his life in an asylum and that at his home.

== Production ==
Produced by Santosh Deshpande and Sayali Deshpande and helmed by Prashen H. Kyawal as Creative Producer and produced by SD Motion Pictures Pvt Ltd.

Produced by SD Motion Pictures, this film stars Sanjay Mishra, Tannishtha Chatterjee, Priyanka Bose, and Barun Chanda in lead characters. Actor Namit Das has given voice the character of Birsa, from whose POV, the story is narrated.

The film is touted as the first POV film of India to be shot on professional cinema camera (Red Dragon 6K). French DOP Basile Pierrat had been hired to shoot this film, who had to create a custom POV rig for the Red Camera. The film made the official selection at Pune International Film Festival (PIFF), the Rajasthan International Film Festival (RIFF) and the Orange City International Film Festival (OCIFF) to be held between January and February 2019.

== Cast ==
- Sanjay Mishra as KumarJohn
- Namit Das as Birsa Sekhri (voice)
- Barun Chanda as Dr. Idris Shah
- Priyanka Bose as Ridhima
- Tannishtha Chatterjee as Soma Sekhri
- Ashwath Bhatt as Dr. Partho
- Sangramsingh Thakur as Mental Patient
- Arijit Dutta as Biswal Sekhri
- Ravikant Soitkar as Devesh Sekhri
- Rohit Gill as Patient
- Dhananjay Mandaokar as Schizophrenia Patient

== Screenings ==
To date, Rakkhosh has been screened at the following festivals:

- Official Selection Shanghai International Film Festival, China, 2019
- Official Selection Fantafestival, Rome, 2019
- Official Selection Pune International Film Festival (PIFF).
- Official Selection Rajasthan Film Festival (RIFF).
- Official Selection Orange City International Film Festival (OCIFF).
