= Jalsa (2022 film) =

2022 Indian film by Suresh Triveni

- Official release poster
- Directed by: Suresh Triveni
- Written by: Prajwal Chandrashekar; Suresh Triveni; Hussain Dalal; Abbas Dalal
- Produced by: Bhushan Kumar; Krishan Kumar; Vikram Malhotra; Shikhaa Sharma
- Starring: Vidya Balan; Shefali Shah
- Cinematography: Saurabh Goswami
- Edited by: Shivkumar V. Panicker
- Music by: Gaurav Chatterji; Salvage Audio Collective
- Production companies: T-Series; Abundantia Entertainment
- Distributed by: Amazon Prime Video
- Release date: 18 March 2022
- Running time: 126 minutes
- Country: India
- Language: Hindi

Jalsa (transl. Bash; Party; Celebration) is a 2022 Indian Hindi-language thriller film directed by Suresh Triveni. It is produced by T-Series and Abundantia Entertainment. The film stars Vidya Balan and Shefali Shah. It premiered on Amazon Prime Video on 18 March 2022. It received positive reviews, with praise directed towards the cast (particularly Balan).

== Plot ==
In the film, the main character Maya Menon is a successful, rich, hard hitting, truth telling, influential TV journalist, with high morals. She hosts a successful TV show aptly called "Face The Truth" and enjoys celebrity status which is also desired by her competitors, peers and juniors alike. She lives with her son, Ayush, who has cerebral palsy, and her mother. She is in an on-again, off-again romantic relationship with her boss. Maya is on good terms with her ex-husband, who's now happily married to his current Russian wife and they have a baby boy. Her life seemed perfect, until one fateful night when Maya falls asleep at the wheel of her car whilst driving home late from work. She inadvertently hits a young girl who appears in front of her car out of nowhere. After the accident she stops and sees another bystander who's fleeing the scene and she gets spooked and flees the scene of the accident, not knowing that it was all captured on a nearby CCTV camera.

Maya arrives home deeply shaken. She inspects the damage to her car and covers up the car, again caught on security cameras. Rukhsana, is her son's caretaker and cook. Rukhsana had stayed at Maya's for the night, per Maya's request, as she was running late that night. Rukhsana loves Ayush like her own son. She sees that Maya is very upset, but chooses to ignore it.

The next morning, the story starts to unravel. The young girl turns out to be Rukhsana's daughter. Rukhsana is unsure and embarrassed about why her 18-year-old daughter was out so late at night, and what she was doing in the neighborhood where the hit and run happened.

The police officer, assigned to the case, discovers (from CCTV footage) his own indiscretion that took place at the same spot, an hour before the accident. Hence, he is motivated to not disclose the CCTV footage (the only proof of Maya's crime) and suppress the case for his own protection and wellbeing in light of his daughter's upcoming wedding.

The guy fleeing the scene assumed to be the guy the girl was seeing who she had gone out late at night to see. He had tried to make physical advances at her, and the girl was running away from him, when she was hit. So he also chooses to stay silent for his own protection. Only later it is revealed that the girl was there to make videos to post on social media and get more followers. The girl had recently broke up with her boyfriend who works at a mechanic's shop.

Maya's driver who discovers the car damaged and a girl's earring stuck in the broken windshield figures out that Maya was the culprit, but he also remains silent as he needs half a million from Maya to pay for his family's critical expenses.

Maya confesses her crime to her boss, but he encourages her to stay silent, as he is protecting the news station (which is immensely successful due to Maya) as well as himself due to fear of his personal relationship with her coming to light.

The journalist pursuing the case, who discovers the truth, happens to work for Maya, and respects her deeply. She also needs her job and money due to domestic family pressures.

== Cast ==
- Vidya Balan as Maya Menon
- Shefali Shah as Rukhsana Mohammad
- Rohini Hattangadi as Rukmini
- Surya Kasibhatla as Ayush Menon
- Manav Kaul as Anand
- Kashish Rizwan as Aliyah Mohammad
- Shafeen Patel as Imaad
- Vidhatri Bandi as Rohini George
- Iqbal Khan as Amar Malhotra
- Ghanshyam Lalsa as Pradeep
- Shrikant Mohan Yadav as More
- Junaid Khan as Rizwan
- Gurpal Singh as Justice Gulati

== Production ==
The principal photography commenced on 12 August 2021 and wrapped up on 12 January 2022.

== Soundtrack ==
Jalsa

Soundtrack album by Gaurav Chatterji and Salvage Audio Collective
- Released: 23 April 2022
- Genre: Feature film soundtrack
- Length: 16:39
- Language: Hindi
- Label: T-Series

Official audio
- Jalsa - Full Album on YouTube

The music of the film is composed by Gaurav Chatterji and Salvage Audio Collective with lyrics written by Sandeep Gaur and Charan.

Track listing
No.	Title	Lyrics	Singer(s)	Length
1.	"Thehar"	Sandeep Gaur	Shilpa Rao	3:40
2.	"Thehar" (Male Version)	Sandeep Gaur	Gaurav Chatterji	3:38
3.	"Raat" (Music by Salvage Audio Collective)	Charan	Vishwesh Krishnamoorthy	2:13
4.	"Jalsa - Theme"	-	Instrumental	1:48
5.	"Maya's Guilt"	-	Instrumental	2:40
6.	"Ruksana's Pain"	-	Instrumental	1:00
7.	"The Drive"	-	Instrumental	1:40
Total length:				16:39

== Release ==
The film was premiered on Amazon Prime on 18 March 2022 coinciding with Holi.

== Reception ==
Jalsa received positive reviews from critics. On the review aggregator website Rotten Tomatoes, 76% of 17 critics' reviews are positive, with an average rating of 6.3/10.

Renuka Vyavahare of The Times of India gave the film a rating of 4/5 and wrote, "Jalsa, a captivating drama with a complex moral center, keeps you on the edge of your seat for most part of the film. This one's a must watch, all the more for its terrific climax." Anna M. M. Vetticad of Firstpost gave the film a rating of 4/5 and wrote, "Half the battle for Jalsa was won when Vidya Balan and Shefali Shah were roped in to share screen space." Rohit Bhatnagar of The Free Press Journal gave the film a rating of 4/5 and wrote "This cat and mouse chase deals with thrill, strong emotions and the harsh realities of a newsroom." Devesh Sharma of Filmfare gave the film a rating of 4/5 and wrote, "Jalsa means celebration and the film truly is a celebration indeed of good filmmaking." Shubham Kulkarni of Koimoi gave the film a rating of 3.5/5 and wrote, "It is a filmmaker evolving and two of the most prolific actors exploring their craft and maybe surprising their own selves as well." Tushar Joshi of India Today gave the film a rating of 3.5/5 and wrote, "Jalsa is a celebration of two power house performers - Vidya Balan and Shefali Shah." Mayank Shekhar of Mid-Day gave the film a rating of 3.5/5.

Sanjana Jadhav of Pinkvilla gave the film a rating of 3.5/5 and wrote, "Jalsa is a must-watch thriller with top notch storytelling and enjoyable performances." Sukanya Verma of Rediff.com gave the film a rating of 3.5/5 and wrote, "Vidya Balan and Shefali Shah are powerhouse talents and are tailor-made for Jalsa's overwrought premise." Shilajit Mitra of Cinema Express gave the film a rating of 3.5/5. Saibal Chatterjee of NDTV gave the film a rating of 3/5 and wrote, "Discount the overreach and a flaw here and a blemish there and Jalsa works just fine not only because two wonderful actresses are at their very best." Stutee Ghosh of The Quint gavethefilm a rating of 3/5 and wrote, "'Jalsa' is a story of inner-conflict, motherhood, and class, portrayed brilliantly by its two lead protagonists." Suhasini Srihari of Deccan Herald gave the film a rating of 3/5 and wrote, "The film's narrative does not necessarily cut into the emotional veins of the audience, but allows them to participate in a dialogue of the inner conflicts and learn the difference between reality and truth." Shubhra Gupta of The Indian Express gave the film a rating of 2.5/5 and wrote, "Vidya Balan, Shefali Shah film has one of the most tightly executed beginnings, which develops the odd bump as the plot progresses, until it reaches a cathartic end." Taran Adarsh of Bollywood Hungama gave the film a rating of 2.5/5 and wrote, "JALSA boasts of fine performances by Vidya Balan and Shefali Shah with unexpected twists and turns."

Monika Rawal Kukreja of Hindustan Times stated, "Suresh Triveni's film stars Vidya Balan as a journalist and Shefali Shah has the caretaker of her son." Anuj Kumar of The Hindu stated, "Director Suresh Triveni delivers a casting coup of sorts with the fantastic ensemble of actors, while also charting a relatable and riveting tale on how a self-righteous approach crumbles under circumstances." Gautaman Bhaskaran of News18 stated, "Suresh Triveni's work, despite two good actresses in Vidya Balan and Shefali Shah, falls into the rut of wanting to fill the plate with too much with the result that none of it has any meat."
