= Srivinay Salian =

Indian film director

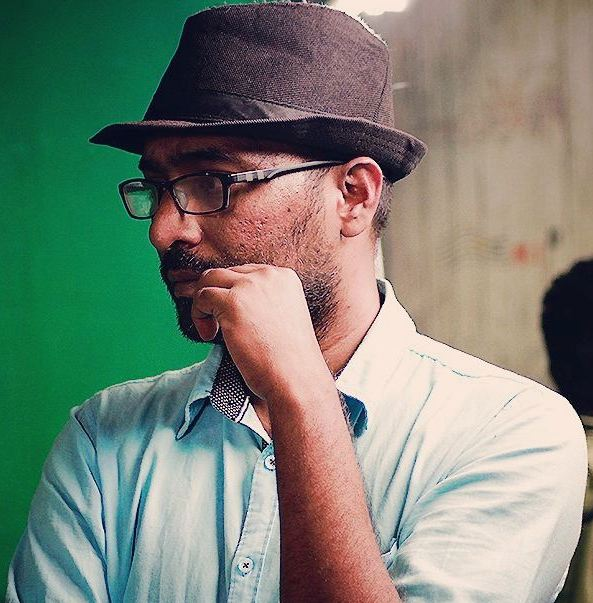
- Srivinay Salian during an AD Film Shoot
- Born: 13 June 1976 (age 49); Mumbai
- Occupations: screenwriter, Film director, Film producer
- Years active: 2007–present
- Website: www.srivinaysalian.com

Srivinay Salian (born 13 June 1976 in Mumbai, India) is an Indian television and film writer and an independent filmmaker.

Srivinay Salian (aka Sreevinay Salian) started his career with Percept Picture Company, as an animation script writer for their show, 'New Adventures of Hanuman'. Later, he went on to write other animation teleseries, such as Chatur Chetan for Dreams Studio (Hyderabad, India) and Howzzattt series for Toonz Animation. Chatur Chetan, received the Best TV Series 2013 award at the 24FPS International Animation Awards festival.

Srivinay Salian has co-produced an independent film titled, Red Gold, along with Gray Area Productions (LA, USA). Red Gold is a social crime drama written and directed by an American filmmaker, Michael Keller. Red Gold was profiled in New Jersey Stage and is set to premiere at the Garden State Film Festival in Atlantic City, N.J. on Saturday, 5 April.

Srivinay Salian was also the writer for Off Road with Gul Panag, an infotainment adventure documentary hosted by Gul Panag on the Discovery Channel.

Srivinay Salian has also written two episodes for the Horror TV Series, Fear Files 2, titled Mangalik and Ghunghroo, produced by BBC Worldwide India. The show was aired in 2015 on Zee TV, a prime entertainment channel in India.

He has written a short story (mini novel) titled, The Shoelace, which is "a psychological & metaphysical thriller".

Srivinay is also Writer & Director of a Short Film title 'Stripped', which explores the Women Objectification issue in the society, by way of Ogling. Hindustan Times, Bhopal, reported that the film had gone viral shortly after its release on YouTube.

His short experimental film, Main Hindustaan Hoon ~ I am India, received very positive critical reviews from viewers as well as independent online news portal - india.com.

"The powerful poem in the backdrop, strengthens the story, Main Hindustan Hoon which has an impeccable impact leaves us startled. The short film is Written, Directed & Edited by Srivinay Salian who has also penned the powerful poetry."

— Aishwarya Krishnan, India.com

Richard Propes of The Independent Critic reviewed Stripped as a thought-provoking short film.

"While I wouldn't dare be dramatic enough to say that Salian gives the audience a sense of Ana's experience, the truth is that Salian doesn't worry about making us comfortable with what Ana endures."

— Richard Propes, The Independent Critic

He is also the screenwriter of Adventures of Appu & Gappu, a 3D Animation film, produced by Magic Wand Animation.

== Feature films ==
- Hacked (2020) (as Dialogue Writer)
- Ghost (2019) (as Dialogue Writer)
- Rakkhosh (as Writer & Co-Director)
- Red Gold (Producer).
- Adventures of Appu & Gappu (Screenwriter).

== Web series ==
- Twisted 2
- Maaya 2
- Zakhmi
- Zindabaad (as Dialogue Writer)
- Unafraid (Season 2)

== TV shows ==
- Off Road with Gul Panag (Season 1)
- Fear Files 2 (Zee TV)

== Teleserials (animation) ==
- New Adventures of Hanuman (Season 1,2)
- Chatur Chetan (Season 1)
- Howzzattt (Season 1)

== Short films ==
- Stripped (Writer/Director).
- Tezaab (Director/Editor).
- Main Hindustan Hoon (Director/Editor).
- Blue Brave Heart (Writer/Director/Cinematographer/Editor).

== Literary works ==
- The Shoelace. Lulu. 2013. (Fiction)
