= Jaal (1986 film) =

- Theatrical release poster
- Directed by: Umesh Mehra
- Written by: Javed Sidddique; M.S.Shinde (dialogues)
- Screenplay by: Anand Kaushal; Shaktiman
- Story by: Theatrical release poster
- Produced by: F.C. Mehra; Parvesh C. Mehra
- Starring: Rekha; Mithun Chakraborty; Mandakini; Moon Moon Sen
- Cinematography: S. Pappu
- Edited by: N. S. Shinde
- Music by: Anu Malik
- Production company: Eagle Films
- Release date: 14 February 1986
- Running time: 130 minutes
- Country: India
- Language: Hindi

Jaal (transl. Trap) is a 1986 Indian Hindi-language action film, produced by F.C. Mehra, Parvesh C. Mehra under the Eagle Films banner and directed by Umesh Mehra. It stars Rekha, Mithun Chakraborty, Mandakini, and Moon Moon Sen with music composed by Anu Malik. The film was remade in Telugu as Kirayi Dada (1987) and in Tamil as Thambi Thanga Kambi (1988).

== Plot ==
Shankar Verma lives a poor lifestyle with his mother, Shanti, after his father, Satpal Verma died many years ago. Before his death he was involved with a courtesan by the name of Meena Bai. Now, Shankar finds himself the object of affection of two beautiful women, Sunita, a wealthy girl of Thakur Bhanupratap Singh and Madhu, a poor girl and lives with her parents, Hariya and Tara. Both women think that Shankar is in love with them. Shankar is subsequently hired by a wealthy woman named Amita who wants him to spy on Thakur Bhanupratap, his sons Balram, Jackie & his partner Kedar. Shankar manages to become a driver in Thakur Bhanupratap household and goes about this task of spying and keeps reporting his findings to Amita regularly. One day while talking to villagers, he finds out that his father had a bad reputation and had not only betrayed the villagers, but had also killed Thakur Bhanupratap's younger brother, Shashipratap. His inquiries take him to Central Jail, but on arrival, he is told by the jail superintendent that his father had finished serving his life sentence & was released & after his release had died just 6 months ago at the Brothel of Meena Bai. This was a surprise to Shankar as he & his mother Shanti had been under the impression that his father Satpal Verma had died much earlier many years ago. Shankar then sets out to find out the whereabouts of Meena Bai, but her brothel had caught fire & was destroyed and now no one knows her whereabouts. Little does Shankar know that Meena Bai is still alive in the shape and form of none other than Amita and is using Shankar as a tool to extract vengeance against Thakur Bhanupratap.

== Cast ==
- Rekha as Meena Bai / Sundari / Amita Singh
- Mithun Chakraborty as Shankar Verma
- Mandakini as Madhu
- Moon Moon Sen as Sunita Singh
- Tanuja as Shanti Verma
- Jeetendra as Chhote Thakur Shashipratap Singh
- Vinod Mehra as Satpal Verma
- Ila Arun as Tara
- Sharat Saxena as Hariya
- Amrit Pal as Bade Thakur Bhanupratap Singh
- Gulshan Grover as Balram
- Tej Sapru as Jackie
- Roopesh Kumar as Kedar
- Jagdeep as Khatarnak Khan
- Mohan Choti as Khatarnak's Assistant
- Yunus Parvez as Milkman

== Soundtrack ==
Song	Singer
"Aapdi Ki Topdi"	Kishore Kumar
"Break Dance, Let's Go"	Asha Bhosle
"Main Hoon Dulhan Ek Raat Ki, Tu Hai Dulha Ek Raat Ka"	Asha Bhosle, Mohammed Aziz
"Ae Mere Doston"	Mohammed Aziz
"Kya Cheez Hai Tu"	Shabbir Kumar
"Raina Bawari Bahi Re"	Ila Arun
