= Gaurav Chatterji =

Indian music composer

- Born: India
- Occupation: Music composer
- Years active: 2019–present

Gaurav Chatterji is an Indian music composer. He is primarily recognized for composing music for films like Jai Mummy Di, Ginny Weds Sunny, Aafat-e-Ishq and Jalsa. The popular song ‘Kaise ab Kahein’ from Gutar Gu was composed by him.

== Career ==
In 2020, Chatterji made his debut with composing music for the film Jai Mummy Di. Same year, he composed for the film Ginny Weds Sunny and Happily Ever After. In 2021, Chatterji composed for the film Aafat-e-Ishq. Hiren Kotwani of Times Of India in review of film, said: “Gaurav Chatterji's music is pleasing to the ears, especially the peppy Love Ka Bhoot reloaded”. In 2022, he composed for the film Jalsa. Anna M.M. Vetticad of Firstpost in review of film, said: “Gaurav Chatterji's grim background score make every moment in Jalsa count”. Bollywood Hungama in its review of film, said: “Gaurav Chatterji's background score is very subtle and very impactful”. Zoom in its review of the film said: “Apart from the gasps of those watching the film with you, it's the brilliant background score, by Gaurav Chatterji, that adds even more drama to the already captivating tale”. He was nominated for Upcoming Composer of the Year for Mirchi Music Awards for the song Phoonk Phoonk from the film Ginny Weds Sunny. He won the FOI online award for Best Background Score for ‘Jalsa’.

== Discography ==
=== Films ===
List of Gaurav Chatterji film credits
Year	Film	Director	Notes
2019	Biskut	Amish Srivastava	
2020	Ginny Weds Sunny	Puneet Khanna	One song Netflix film
2020	Jai Mummy Di	Navjot Gulati	One song
2020	Happily Even After		
2021	Aafat-e-Ishq	Indrajit Nattoji	Zee5 film
2022	Jalsa	Suresh Triveni	Two songs Amazon Prime Video film
2022	Dobaaraa	Anurag Kashyap	Four songs
2023	I Love You	Nikhil	One song JioCinema film
2023	Tiku Weds Sheru	Sai Kabir	Amazon Prime Video film Three songs (One along with Sai Kabir)
2023	Mission Raniganj	Tinu Suresh Desai	One song

=== Singles ===
Year	Song	Singer	Notes
2019	Mon Ke Bojhai	Sona Mohapatra	
