= Ashwath Bhatt =

Indian actor (born 1975)

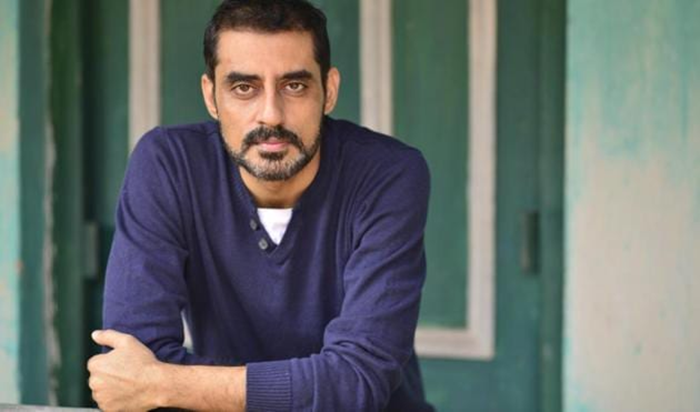
- Bhatt in 2010s
- Born: Srinagar, Jammu and Kashmir, India
- Education: National School of Drama
- Occupation: Actor
- Years active: 2010–present

Ashwath Bhatt is an Indian film actor. He is known for his roles in IB71, Mission Majnu, Sita Ramam, Raaz Reboot, Rakkhosh, Raazi, Phantom, Kesari, and Haider.

== Early life ==
Ashwath Bhatt was born in Srinagar, Jammu and Kashmir, India into a family of Kashmiri Pandits. He received a scholarship from the National School of Drama (NSD) in 2001. In 2003, he graduated from London Academy of Music and Dramatic Art, Hammersmith, London.

== Career ==
Bhatt made his Hindi film debut with Lamhaa (2010). He followed this with a role in Meghna Gulzar's Raazi. In 2019, he starred alongside Akshay Kumar in Anurag Singh's Kesari. In 2023, he acted in Mandali.

== Filmography ==
=== Film ===
Year	Title	Character	Notes
2014	Haider	Zahoor Hussain	
2015	Phantom	Firoz	
2016	Raaz Reboot	Trilok Shastri	
2018	Manto	Prosecutor Qasim	
2018	Raazi	Mehboob Syed	
2019	Kesari	Gul Badshah Khan	
2019	Rakkhosh	Dr. Partho	
2022	Khuda Haafiz Chapter 2 - Agni Pariksha	-	
2022	Sita Ramam	Ansari	
2023	IB71	Afsal Aga	
2023	Mission Majnu	Zia-ul-Haq	
2025	The Diplomat	Malik Sahab	

=== TV Series ===
Year	Title	Character	Notes
2021	Cartel	-	
2019	Leila	Mr. Dixit	
2025	Crime Beat	Prashant Negi	
2026	Made In India: A Titan Story	Shankar Manoharan	
