= Aagey Se Right =

- Theatrical release poster
- Directed by: Indrajit Nattoji
- Written by: Story and Screenplay: Indrajit Nattoji; Additional Screenplay: Dheeraj Rattan; Manoj Santoshi; Abhijeet Deshpande; Dialogues: Abhijeet Deshpande; Indrajit Nattoji; Manoj Santoshi
- Produced by: Ronnie Screwvala
- Starring: Shreyas Talpade; Kay Kay Menon; Mahie Gill; Shenaz Treasurywala; Shiv Panditt
- Cinematography: Amitabha Singh
- Edited by: Rachel Reuben
- Music by: Songs and Background Score: Amartya Rahut; Guest Composer: Ram Sampath
- Production companies: UTV Spotboy; Bindass
- Distributed by: UTV Motion Pictures
- Release date: 4 September 2009
- Running time: 117 minutes
- Country: India
- Language: Hindi

Aagey Se Right (lit. 'Straight, then right') is a 2009 Indian Hindi-language comedy film written and directed by advertisement filmmaker Indrajit Nattoji in his feature debut and produced by Ronnie Screwvala under UTV Spotboy Motion Pictures and Bindass. The film stars Shreyas Talpade, Kay Kay Menon, Mahi Gill, Shenaz Treasurywala and Shiv Panditt in the lead roles. The film was released on 4 September 2009.

Indiagames, a subsidiary of UTV, also released a tie-in mobile video game to accompany the film's release.

== Plot ==
Hailing from a small town in Maharashtra, 28-year-old Dinkar Waghmare is a sub-inspector with the Mumbai Police who spends his time dreaming of beautiful TV reporter Soniya Bhatt. The son of a successful police officer, he has never solved a case and has always stayed away from serious action. This leads to constant pressure from his nagging mother to justify his father's larger-than-life reputation. One day, Dinkar loses his Bajrangbali-stickered gun and is under extreme pressure to find it.

Meanwhile, terrorist Balma Rashid-ul-Khairi, alias Janu, has arrived in Mumbai and is planning to bomb several locations in the city with the help of local don Raghav Shetty. However, he soon falls in love with Mumbai life and a bargirl named Pearl. But when Janu abandons his life of violence to romance Pearl, his chief Mojassama comes to Mumbai to complete his mission and kill both Janu and Pearl. As he pursues his gun around Mumbai, Dinkar accidentally becomes a hero when he saves the mayor's life and then prevents the daughter of the police commissioner from committing suicide.

He meets Soniya, who falls in love with the city's new hero. He is promoted to inspector and is assigned to head security at the Mumbai Police Show. Mojassama plants a bomb under the stage as planned, but Janu comes to defuse it as it is about to explode when Pearl starts her performance. With the help of Dinkar, Janu defuses the bomb. The terrorist's plot is foiled, and Dinkar is able to retrieve his gun and avoid humiliation.

== Cast ==
- Shreyas Talpade as Dinkar Waghmare
- Kay Kay Menon as Janu a.k.a. Balma-Rashidul Khairi
- Mahi Gill as Soniya Bhatt
- Shenaz Treasurywala as Pearl
- Shiv Panditt as Sunny
- Shruti Seth as Suhasi
- Vijay Maurya as Raghav Shetty
- Rakesh Bedi as Police Commissioner
- Rajesh Khera as T.V. Vinod
- Shaukat Baig as Parsi Baba
- Nawab Shah as Mojassama
- Bharti Achrekar as Kaanta Aai
- Sarthak Bhasin as Lucky Singh
- Karan Veer Mehra as Rocky
- Vipul Vig as Vikki
- Sanjay Sharma as Bheem
- Rajesh Singh as Goli
- Anil Bapu Gawas as Mayor
- Arvind Parab as Johnny Quarter

== Reception ==
=== Critical response ===
Taran Adarsh of Bollywood Hungama gave the film 1.5 out of 5, writing, "On the whole, AAGEY SE RIGHT has a few funny moments, but overall, this one doesn't go left or right, but directionless." Raja Sen of Rediff.com wrote, "It feels bad to write off a film that shows off some slivers of genuine wit. The B-movie sets are straight out of Malegaon Ka Superman territory, and it's refreshing to see a film reference not just the obvious Quentin Tarantino via a girl shrieking 'hunny bunny' all the time but also the beautiful moment from Woody Allen's Everyone Says I Love You where Goldie Hawn flies sublimely into the air as she dances with Allen. And yet, by the time the predictable climax drags around, it feels like a tackily made, badly paced Main Hoon Na. With nary a laugh to show for it. Nope, in the end there's too much left to do to call this film right."

=== Box office ===
the film earned ₹4.21 crore against a ₹6 crore budget.

== Awards ==
Aagey Se Right was nominated for the annual SXSW "Excellence in Title Design" Awards 2010, and was the only Indian finalist at the awards.
