= Howzzattt =

Indian animated series

- Genre: Comedy, sports, action
- Written by: Srivinay Salian; Renju Ramesh
- Directed by: Renju Ramesh
- Creative director: Renju Ramesh
- Opening theme: "Howzzattt!"
- Country of origin: India
- Original language: Hindi
- No. of seasons: 1
- No. of episodes: 13

Production
- Executive producer: P. Jayakumar
- Producer: Rathan Sam George
- Running time: 22 minutes
- Production company: Toonz Animation India

Original release
- Network: Disney XD India
- Release: 13 May 2012

Howzzattt!! is an Indian digital 2D animation series focusing on six children who enjoy the game of cricket. They call themselves the Gulab Nagar Junglees. Toonz Animation India developed the series in Trivandrum. The 13-episode series first aired on Disney XD India from 2012 to 2014 and then was syndicated on Discovery Kids India. It was developed by Renju Ramesh and produced by Rathan Sam George. P. Jayakumar was the executive producer.

== Plot ==
The Gulab Nagar Junglees are named Guru, Gyani, Bull, Bablu, Shekhar and Ajay. Under the coaching and guidance of Sweety Aunty, these youngsters hone their cricket skills to be on par with the local bullies, who never abide by the rules. Meanwhile, Col. Singh and Sweety Aunty support the youngsters. Thakral, a wealthy businessman, is often at odds with them, subjecting them to one challenge after another. The youngsters take on challenge after challenge to get out of every tough situation they find themselves in. As a result, each episode is a cricket match against a new set of opponents. While the opponents vary, the youngsters often find themselves pitted against Thakral, who intends to acquire the Gulab Nagar Society land.

== Characters ==
- Guru: Captain. He is rebellious in nature and is always up for a challenge. He believes in his team. Although he is the best Batsman, he can also bowl. Guru has a crush on Tina.
- Gyani: He is the youngest, shortest and smartest. He is obsessed with cricket and knows every detail of cricket history. Unfortunately, he is also the team's weakest player, but a good off-spinner. Guru has a keen interest in inventing gadgets, such as a tracker watch.
- Bablu: He is the lazy fat kid, who unknowingly causes messes. He has the unique skill of never dropping any ball that is thrown at him. He eats a lot, even when he comes to the crease for batting. He has a yo-yo, which the others think is his lucky charm.
- Bull: He is a gentle giant and a child at heart. He has a soft spot for babies and butterflies. He is the best bowler and the most dangerous fast bowler in the world, delivering at above 180 kmph. His deliveries can burn the batsman or even make a ditch in the pitch.
- Shekhar: He is a lean, slender kid who can run like no other. He always wears a helmet for unknown reasons. He is a good batsman and a great leg spinner. He is the best fielder.
- Ajay: He is a smart kid from the rich neighborhood who likes to hang out with the Gulab Nagar Society. He is one of the best players. He is resentful of being pampered by his butler Manikchand. He is the steadiest batsmen.
- Sweety Aunty: She is a kind, affectionate and loving woman, who has two passions in life – cooking and cricket. Besides that, she is a die-hard fan of the youngsters and volunteers to become their coach.
- Col. Singh: He is a resident of Gulab Nagar Society who develops a love–hate relationship with the youngsters. He is shrewd, judgmental and a strict disciplinarian.
- Thakral: He is a wealthy businessman and the manager of Breach Candy Cricket Club, who cannot stand the youngsters. He is an egomaniac who will go to any length to beat them.
- Manikchand: Ajay's devoted butler who tries to protect Ajay, even when he does not need it. He is lovingly called Manikki by everybody except Ajay.
- Dhamaal Singh: A crazy commentator who mostly supports the Gulab Nagar's opposition teams, even those who cheat. His commentary is weird and unorthodox.
- Kamal Singh: A commentator who is more mature than Dhamaal, mostly supporting the Gulab Nagar team.
- Tina: An exceptional beauty, who is Thakral's daughter. She does not support Thakral, but instead supports the Gulab Nagar Junglees. She loves spa sessions. She has a crush on Guru but never tells him; even though the rest of the team already knows.

== Episodes ==
The series ran for 13 episodes and was later released by Prime Video on their website.

1. The Challenge
2. The Tale of The Talisman
3. Star Hunt
4. Spaced Out
5. Spooked
6. The Great Escape
7. Bollywood Blues
8. Under the Scanner
9. The Political Game
10. Box Cricket
11. Yo Yo
12. The Return of Babbar Singh Part 1
13. The Return of Babbar Singh Part 2

== See also ==
- List of Indian animated television series
