= Aafat-E-Ishq =

2021 Indian film by Indrajit Nattoji

Aafat-e-Ishq
- Official release poster
- Directed by: Indrajit Nattoji
- Screenplay by: Indrajit Nattoji; Neha Bahuguna
- Based on: Liza, the Fox-Fairy by Károly Ujj Mészáros
- Produced by: Zee Studios
- Starring: Neha Sharma; Deepak Dobriyal; Namit Das
- Narrated by: Ila Arun
- Cinematography: Shreya Gupta
- Edited by: Shan Mohammed
- Music by: Gaurav Chatterji
- Production company: Zee Studios
- Distributed by: ZEE5
- Release date: 29 October 2021
- Running time: 115 minutes
- Country: India
- Language: Hindi

Aafat-e-Ishq (transl. Dark Love) is a 2021 Indian Hindi-language black comedy film directed by Indrajit Nattoji, and produced by Zee Studios. The film is based on the Hungarian film Liza, the Fox-Fairy. It features Neha Sharma, Namit Das, Deepak Dobriyal, Amit Sial. The film was released on 29 October 2021 on ZEE5. The film received mixed reviews, criticizing the pace and writing while appreciating the multigenre filmmaking style, unconventional storytelling, unique cinema art, and outstanding performances.

== Synopsis ==
Lallo is a 30-year-old lonely caretaker of a bedridden widow named Bahuji. Her only friend is a friendly ghost and singer, Atmaram. After reading the fabled Laal Pari book, she thinks she is cursed and whoever falls in love with Lallo dies mysteriously.

== Cast ==
- Neha Sharma as Lallo
- Namit Das as Atmaram, Ghost
- Deepak Dobriyal as Police Investigator, Vikram Kamal
- Amit Sial as Prem Gunjan
- Ila Arun as Bahuji, widow
- Archanna Guptaa as Suhani
- Vikram Kochhar as Sunil Samajdhar
- Anil Charanjeett as Pratap
- Darshan Jariwalla as Ramdayal
- Kenisha Awasthi as Zoya
- Garima Jain as the girl in the magazine
- Hetal Puniwala as Postmaster Mishra
- Payas Pandit as a Police constable, Fauzia,

== Soundtrack ==
Aafat-e-Ishq

Soundtrack album by Gaurav Chatterji
- Released: 8 December 2021
- Recorded: 2021
- Genre: Feature film soundtrack
- Length: 13:27
- Language: Hindi
- Label: Zee Music Company
- Producer: Gaurav Chatterji

Official audio
- Aafat-e-Ishq - Full Album on YouTube

The music of the film is composed by Gaurav Chatterji with lyrics written by Ginny Diwan, Sandeep Gaur and Indrajit Nattoji. Namit Das sung the first song in his career.

Track listing
No.	Title	Lyrics	Singer(s)	Length
1.	"Love Ka Bhoot Reloaded"	Ginny Diwan	Nakash Aziz, Indrajit Nattoji	2:41
2.	"Love Ka Bhoot"	Ginny Diwan	Namit Das, Gaurav Chatterji	2:52
3.	"Tu Meri Jaan"	Sandeep Gaur	Namit Das	2:59
4.	"Aafat"	Ginny Diwan	Jatinder Singh	2:35
5.	"Maut Se Loha"	Ginny Diwan	Piyush Kapoor	2:22
Total length:				13:27

== Release ==
The film was released on ZEE5 on 29 October 2021.

== Reception ==
Hiren Kotwani of The Times of India gave the film 2 out of 5, writing ″At the end of it, Aafat-e-Ishq doesn't live up to the expectations as a remake of the original Hungarian movie that won several awards at various film festivals.″ Chirantana Bhatt of Gujarati Mid Day wrote ″It is imperative to talk about how magic realism has been added to the extent and how the presence of art is treated in the direction, cinematography, set-up and other designing of this film. This is an attempt to explore the different ways in which art can be present on the cinema screen.″
