= Tiku Weds Sheru =

2023 Indian film by Sai Kabir

- Official release poster
- Directed by: Sai Kabir
- Written by: Sai Kabir; Amit Tiwari
- Produced by: Kangana Ranaut
- Starring: Nawazuddin Siddiqui; Avneet Kaur
- Cinematography: Fernando Gayesky
- Edited by: Ballu Saluja
- Music by: Songs: Gaurav Chatterji; Sai Kabir; Background Score: Aman Pant
- Production company: Manikarnika Films
- Distributed by: Amazon Prime Video
- Release date: 23 June 2023
- Running time: 112 minutes
- Country: India
- Language: Hindi

Tiku Weds Sheru is a 2023 Indian Hindi-language satirical romantic comedy-drama film. The film is produced by Kangana Ranaut, written and directed by Sai Kabir under the banner of Manikarnika Films. It stars Nawazuddin Siddiqui and Avneet Kaur in lead roles. The film premiered on 23 June 2023 on Amazon Prime Video to negative reviews from critics.

== Cast ==
- Nawazuddin Siddiqui as Shiraz "Sheru" Khan Afghani
- Avneet Kaur as Tasleem "Tiku" Khan
- Khushi Bhardwaj as Sana, Tiku's sister
- Mukesh Bhatt as Anand
- Vipin Sharma as Shahid
- Zakir Hussain as Ahmed Rizvi
- Suresh Vishwakarma as Chandresh Bhund
- Ghanshyam Garg as Raza Ali Khan
- Murari Kumar as Mukhtar
- Aakash Pandey as Mahesh
- Shubhankar Das as Yakub
- Rahoul as Binni
- Satish Nayakodi as ACP Prabhakar
- Aslam Wadkar as Inspector Kadam
- Tanya Desai as Pinki
- Madhavi Lawre as Suman
- Aradhana Sharma as Rita
- Lesan Karimova as Natasha
- Aseem Dubey as Tiku's father
- Meenu Singh as Tiku's mother
- Sagar Rambhia as News anchor
- Sanju Kumar as Guard 1
- Anjani Kumar as Guard 2
- Kangana Ranaut as herself (special appearance)

== Synopsis ==
Tiku Weds Sheru film is billed as a tale of two eccentric, starry eyed characters, who want to make it big in Bollywood. The film is a kind of love letter to those who come to this city, but lose their way yet end up finding something much more meaningful. Ranaut described the movie as a heartfelt ode to Mumbai, the city of dreams.

== Production ==
=== Development ===
The film was initially titled as "Divine Lovers", with Irrfan Khan and Kangana Ranaut as main leads in 2016. The film got stalled because director Sai Kabir felt severely ill for three to four years. When the filmmaker went back to working on the script, Irrfan died in April 2020. Kangana was also not in the same frame of mind that she was eight to ten years ago. Hence they decided to bring in a new cast.

The film is Kangana's maiden production after the launch of her production house in 2020.

=== Casting ===
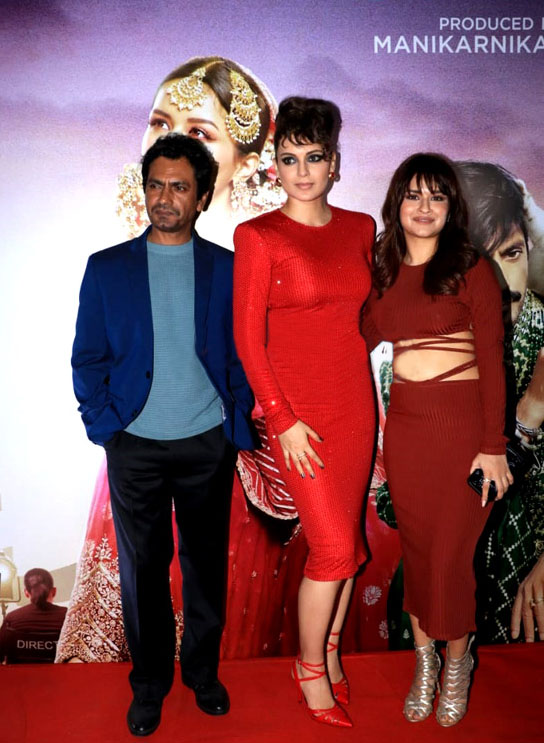
Lead actors Nawazuddin Siddiqui and Avneet Kaur, with producer Kangana Ranaut, at the film's wrap-up party.

After Irrfan Khan's demise, Nawazuddin Siddiqui was cast for the male lead, and Avneet Kaur was finalized as the female lead.

Besides the fresh pairing, casting brought to the fore the old debate of the huge age gap between the male and the female actor. On this, Ranaut expressed that she overlooked 27-year age gap between the stars as the pair seemed her well-suited for the storyline, and Kaur stated that she does not see the age gap as a problem as it was a requirement for the film.

=== Filming ===
The film's pre-production began in October 2021. Principal photography began on 8 November 2021 in Mumbai, outdoor schedule began on 20 December 2021 in Bhopal and its last schedule began on 22 January 2022 back in Mumbai. The film wrapped up on 1 February 2022.

== Soundtrack ==
Tiku Weds Sheru

Soundtrack album by Gaurav Chatterji and Sai Kabir
- Released: 23 June 2023
- Genre: Feature film soundtrack
- Length: 17:03
- Language: Hindi
- Label: Sony Music India

The music for the film is composed by Gaurav Chatterji and Sai Kabir, while the lyrics are written by Shellee and Sai Kabir. The film's background score is composed by Aman Pant.

No.	Title	Lyrics	Music	Singer(s)	Length
1.	"Tum Se Milke"	Sai Kabir	Gaurav Chatterji, Sai Kabir	Mohit Chauhan	3:02
2.	"Meri Jaane Jaan"	Shellee	Gaurav Chatterji	Shreya Ghoshal, Nakash Aziz, Cyli Khare	3:40
3.	"Kapat"	Sai Kabir	Sai Kabir	Debanjali B Joshi	1:48
4.	"DNA Bhaukali"	Shellee	Gaurav Chatterji	Debanjali B Joshi, Nihal Shetty	2:36
5.	"Intezaar Tha (Male Version)"	Sai Kabir	Sai Kabir	Gaurav Chatterji	2:19
6.	"Intezaar Tha (Female Version)"	Sai Kabir	Sai Kabir	Monali Thakur	2:20
7.	"Intezaar Tha (Reprise Version)"	Sai Kabir	Sai Kabir	Sai Kabir, Gaurav Chatterji	1:18
Total length:					17:03

== Release ==
The film's official trailer was released on 14 June 2023, and the film premiered on 23 June 2023 on Amazon Prime Video.

== Reception ==
=== Critical response ===
The film received generally negative reviews from the film critics who praised the performances of Kaur and Siddiqui but panned the direction and storyline. On the review aggregator website Rotten Tomatoes, 0% of 9 critics' reviews are positive, with an average rating of 4.3/10.

Vinamra Mathur of Firstpost gave the film 3 stars (out of 5) and wrote, "What keeps Tiku Weds Sheru afloat are Tiku and Sheru. Right when Tiku is introduced, her age gap with Sheru is quickly addressed that a majority of the movies shy away from". Kahkasha of Punjab Kesari gave the film 3 stars (out of 5) and wrote, "The film is a mix of love story, drama, comedy and emotion". Shanti Nanisetti of Telangana Today gave the film 2.5 stars (out of 5) and wrote, "The film is like a single pot dish – many ingredients are thrown in to see what surprise dish gets churned out". Filmfare gave a rating of 2.5 stars (out of 5) and wrote, "Watch the film for the performances and also if you wish to see the grime beneath the glamour of Bollywood".

Gautaman Bhaskaran of CNN-IBN gave the film 2 stars (out of 5) and wrote, "Tiku Weds Sheru looks quite jaded, and seems to be unsure of where to place itself". Shilajit Mitra of The Hindu wrote, "Tiku Weds Sheru has the goods of a moving love story. But it does not deliver". Saibal Chatterjee of NDTV gave the film a rating of 2 (out of 5) and wrote, "Tiku Weds Sheru wants to project itself as a film about a strong and spirited girl willing to go the distance in pursuit of her dream. But it frequently reduces the female protagonist to a damsel who paints herself into a corner and then needs to be rescued". Abhimanyu Mathur of DNA India gave 2 stars (out of 5) and wrote, "Tiku Weds Sheru sees Nawazuddin Siddiqui and Avneet Kaur deliver sincere and earnest performances marred by a weak story and bad direction".

Shubhra Gupta of The Indian Express gave the film 1.5 stars (out of 5) and wrote, "While Nawazuddin Siddiqui and Avneet Kaur are good fit for the roles, they never quite fit together and you can never overcome the queasiness caused by seeing Sheru slobbering over Tiku". Deepa Gahlot of Rediff gave the film 1 star (out of 5) and wrote, "There is no redeeming feature in Tiku Weds Sheru, and that is also rare. Even the worst movies have a song, a scene, or a performance that makes all the effort of making a film worthwhile. This one should have been scrapped at script stage, if there was such thing on the table". Vijayalakshmi Narayanan of The Free Press Journal gave the film 1 star (out of 5) and wrote, "From its sluggish pace, to cringe-inducing moments of romance and dialogue delivery to its misplaced music, Tiku Weds Sheru is an ill-fated union, best left unattended, unless you’re looking for a cure to insomnia".
