= Namit Das =

Indian actor

- Education: St Xaviers College, Bhavan's AH Wadia High School
- Occupation: Actor
- Years active: 2002–present
- Spouse: Shruti Vyas
- Parent(s): Chandan Dass; Yamini Das

Namit Das is an Indian film, television, theatre actor and singer. He has acted in several television commercials. He belongs to a family of musicians and singers; his father is reputed ghazal singer Chandan Dass. Namit is also a trained singer and took classical-music training from his father Chandan Dass and Bhavdeep Jaipurwale, but preferred acting over singing for a long time. Recently he has released an album with Anurag Shanker, which has five tracks.

Namit Das married his longtime girlfriend Shruti Vyas on 15 February 2015. Shruti herself is a theater and film actress and has appeared in many ads, including an OLX Womaniyan ad, where she was the face of OLX. She is the sister of actor Sumeet Vyas. Namit and Shruti got married in Mumbai in a traditional ceremony, graced by family and friends.

== Filmography ==
=== Films ===
Year	Film	Role	Notes
2009	The President Is Coming	Ramesh S.	
2009	Wake Up Sid	Rishi Atul Raheja	
2010	Lafangey Parindey	Chaddi	
2010	Phillum City	Chaubey	
2011	Bulb Hila		
2011	Nithya		
2013	Ghanchakkar	Idris	
2014	Ankhon Dekhi	Ajju	
2015	Hamari Adhuri Kahani	Saanjh Prasad (adult)	Cameo appearance
2018	Sui Dhaaga	Guddu	
2018	Pataakha	Jagan	
2019	Rakkhosh	Birsa Voice Over	
2020	Bahut Hua Samman	Rajat Tiwari	
2021	Aafat-E-Ishq	Atmaram	Zee5 film
2023	Rocky Aur Rani Kii Prem Kahaani	Sumen Mitra	
2025	Aap Jaisa Koi	Deepak	
2025	The Taj Story	Avinash Das	

=== TV series ===
Year	Series	Role	Notes
2004-05	Pancham	Pancham	
2008	Mumbai Calling	Amar	
2010	State of the Union	Indian caller	
2010	Axe Ur Ex	Host	
2015–2016	Sumit Sambhal Lega	Sumit Walia	
2017	Kaushiki	DK	
2018	Table No 5		Web Series
2019	Abhay	Govind	Web Series
2020	Aarya	Jawahar	Web Series
2020	A Suitable Boy	Haresh Khanna	BBC One & Netflix
2020	Mafia	Nitin Kumar	Web series
2022	Rocket Boys	Prosenjit Day	SonyLIV
2023	Choona	Triloki	Netflix
2025	Mafia		zee5

=== Plays ===
Das has worked in a number of plays.

Year	Play	Director	Comments
2002	Shadow Box	Nadir Khan	
2002	Noises Off	AtuI Kumar	
2003-04	I Am Invincible (Clown Show)	AtuI Kumar	
2004	Voices	AtuI Kumar	
2006	Much Ado About Nothing	Imogen Butler Cole	Also composed music
2006-07	Chairs	AtuI Kumar	
2006-08	Numbers In The Dark	AtuI Kumar	
2007-	The President Is Coming	Kunal Roy Kapoor	
2007	The Soul Of A Sales Man	Etiene Coutinho	
2007	Mastana Rampuri Urf Chappanchuri	Sunil Shanbag	
2008-11	The Shehenshah Of Azeemo	Sumeet & Shivani	
2008-11	Hamlet The Clown Prince	Rajat Kapoor	
2011-	Stories In A Song	Sunil Shanbag	
2011-	Bombay Talkies	Vikram Kapadia	

2023 monsoon wedding the musical

== Dubbing roles ==
=== Live action films ===
Film title	Actor	Character	Dub Language	Original Language	Original Year Release	Dub Year Release	Notes
Hellboy II: The Golden Army	Doug Jones	Abe Sapien	Hindi	English	2008	2008	Rajesh Khattar dubbed this role in the previous movie.
Edge of Tomorrow	Kick Gurry	Griff	Hindi	English	2014	2014	Hindi dub only created for the Home media release.
