= The Bypass =

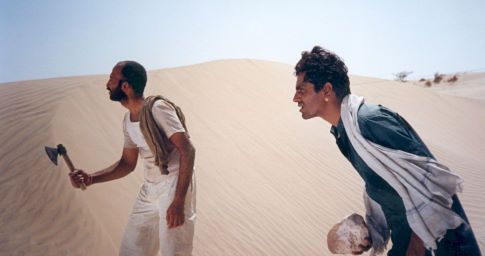
- Screenshot from the film
- Directed by: Amit Kumar
- Written by: Amit Kumar
- Produced by: Asif Kapadia; Trevor Ingman
- Starring: Nawazuddin Siddiqui, Sundar Dan Detha, Irrfan Khan
- Cinematography: Rajeev Ravi
- Music by: Dario Marianelli
- Production companies: FilmFour; UK Film Council
- Release date: August 2003 (Edinburgh)
- Running time: 17 minutes
- Countries: India; United Kingdom
- Language: Silent

The Bypass is a 2003 Indian-British short silent crime film written and directed by Amit Kumar starring Nawazuddin Siddiqui, Irfan Khan and Sundar Dan Detha. The Bypass was filmed on a stranded road somewhere in Rajasthan, India. The film was shown at the Edinburgh International Film Festival and Aubagne Film Festival.

== Plot ==
The film is about two friends who stay by the stranded road "Bypass" and a corrupt police officer. The two friends frequently mug and ultimately kill the people who travel by the road. Amit Kumar starts the film by showing a couple traveling by the road, and then Nawazuddin Siddiqui stops the car by throwing a rock. The two friends then steal money and graphically kill the pair. Irrfan Khan's role as a corrupt police officer is established when he takes a watch by cutting the wrist of a dead man, then rapes a lady and tries to kill the two muggers for the money they had. However, the dumb mugger attacks the police officer and kills him. The woman is let gone off. What happens next is a suspense itself. The director represents the thrill of "Bypass" through violence and aggression.

== Cast ==
- Nawazuddin Siddiqui - 1st Mugger
- Sundar Dan Detha - 2nd Mugger
- Irrfan Khan - Corrupt Policeman
- Manorama Goswami - Kidnapped Girl
- Kasturi Kasturi - Woman in the Jeep
- Karuna Pandey - Woman in Car
- Ashwin Chaddha- Man in Car
- Kalyan Singh- Jeep Driver
