= Raat Akeli Hai: The Bansal Murders =

2025 Indian crime thriller film

- Official release poster
- Directed by: Honey Trehan
- Written by: Smita Singh
- Produced by: Ronnie Screwvala; Honey Trehan; Abhishek Chaubey
- Starring: Nawazuddin Siddiqui; Chitrangada Singh; Radhika Apte; Rajat Kapoor; Revathi; Deepti Naval; Sanjay Kapoor
- Cinematography: Sirsha Ray
- Edited by: Tanya Chhabria
- Music by: Karan Kulkarni
- Production companies: RSVP Movies; MacGuffin Pictures
- Distributed by: Netflix
- Release dates: 21 November 2025 (Goa); 19 December 2025 (Netflix)
- Running time: 136 minutes
- Country: India
- Language: Hindi

Raat Akeli Hai: The Bansal Murders (transl. The Night Is Lonely: The Bansal Murders) is a 2025 Indian Hindi-language crime thriller film directed by Honey Trehan. Produced by Ronnie Screwvala's RSVP Movies and Honey Trehan and Abhishek Chaubey's MacGuffin Pictures, the film stars Nawazuddin Siddiqui and Chitrangada Singh, with Radhika Apte making a special appearance. It is a sequel to Raat Akeli Hai (2020).

== Plot ==
After a brief period of meditation, Meera Bansal is disturbed by the sounds of crows. As she reaches the backyard, she witnesses a horrifying scene: crows falling to their deaths.

On the orders of DGP Sameer Verma, Sub-Inspector Jatil Yadav is summoned to the Bansal house to determine the cause of the incident. After taking statements from all the Bansal family members and the staff present, he witnesses a restrained Aarav struggling violently, after which Meera intervenes, calms him down, and takes him back to his room. Jatil learns that Aarav is a drug addict fighting against relapse and undergoing treatment supervised by the family. He also meets Guru Maa, a spiritual guru associated with the Bansal family, who warns everyone present that the odds are unfavourable and that no one will be able to stop the events to come.

Jatil investigates and discovers the culprits responsible for the crow massacre. Upon being captured, they confess that the plan had been initiated by an unknown man. The duo are revealed to be working for Newrise TV, owned by Rajesh Bansal, who has a bitter relationship with the Bansal family, who manage the newspaper *Prabhat Manthan*, and is engaged in a dispute over the assets of the Prabhat Group. During interrogation, Rajesh denies the allegations.

Jatil balances his investigation with his personal life involving Radha and his mother, who often contradicts his beliefs. As the investigation concludes, Yadav visits the Bansal house where, to his shock, he finds Meera covered in blood, the Bansal family (excluding Aastha, Meera, Om Prakash, and the guard) brutally murdered, and Aarav lying in the swimming pool. This prompts the DGP to assign the case to SP Chauhan, who resorts to any means necessary to conclude the investigation quickly. Meera is called upon to recount the incident and reveals that Aarav was the killer who, after murdering the family members, was kicked to his death by an injured Om Prakash. Based on the findings of Dr. Panicker, the department learns that the victims had tested positive for clonazepam, which had been ingested through desserts delivered from Guru Maa’s establishment, and that Aarav had been under its influence. Yadav questions Aastha, who reveals that Aarav had been relapsing and, although he had appeared normal prior to the murders, she believes he had no motive to commit such an act. After gathering statements and evidence from the wider community, Yadav concludes that Meera played a role in the murders, based on footage from the garden CCTV and Dr. Amit’s statement.

Yadav later becomes convinced that something is not right, particularly regarding the death of Meera’s son. Despite Dr. Panicker’s resistance, she eventually relents and assists Yadav in his investigation. Together, they discover that the boy, who had an existing pulmonary infection, had fallen ill too rapidly to have died within three days, as the disease usually takes much longer to manifest and become fatal. He interrogates Dr. Nisha Pal regarding the nebuliser, recalling an earlier incident Jatil had witnessed while apprehending the crow culprits. Nisha recounts the events of a local school function during which gas leaked from a nearby factory, resulting in the deaths of her son and several other children and sick residents. Yadav uncovers evidence from the factory connected to Meera and proceeds to interrogate her with Verma’s approval. The tense interrogation ultimately proves futile as Meera successfully establishes her innocence. However, Yadav uncovers crucial evidence and, with the help of Panicker and Nisha, visits Om Prakash at the hospital.

In a shocking twist, Yadav exposes Om Prakash as the killer of the Bansals by contradicting his version of events with newly discovered evidence. The full plan is revealed: Om Prakash, who had been their driver at the time, attended the school function alongside Meera and her son, where Meera’s son and his daughter Rinki both fell ill and died. Prakash was demoted under pressure from the Bansal family, while the factory was shut down through their influence. Enraged by the injustice faced by his community and grief-stricken over his daughter’s death, Prakash planned to eliminate the family on the anniversary of her death. He supplied drugs to Aarav before killing Mahinder and the remaining family members. Aarav witnesses the killings and attacks him. As Om Prakash attempts to flee, he is cornered by Meera and Aastha, leading to Aarav injuring him and subsequently dying himself. Om Prakash’s recorded confession is leaked to the media, where Verma and Chauhan brief reporters on the conclusion of the investigation, dismiss Dr. Panicker, and suspend Yadav for refusing to conform to their methods.

Jatil and Radha resume their discussion about their future, and he reassures Radha of his commitment, while Dr. Panicker also reconciles with his mother.

== Cast ==
- Nawazuddin Siddiqui as Inspector Jatil Yadav
- Chitrangada Singh as Meera Bansal
- Deepti Naval as Guru Maa
- Rajat Kapoor as DGP Sameer Verma
- Revathi as Dr. Rosie Panicker
- Sanjay Kapoor as Rajesh Bansal
- Ila Arun as Sarita Kumari, Jatil's mother
- S. M. Zaheer as Mahinder Bansal
- Akhilendra Mishra as SP Chauhan
- Radhika Apte as Radha (Special appearance)
- Priyanka Setia as Dr.Nisha Pal
- Suhas Ahuja as Dr.Amit Khanna
- Delzad Hiwale as Aarav Bansal
- Aarushi Bajaj as Aastha Bansal
- Chiraj Bajaj as Madhav Bansal

== Release ==
Raat Akeli Hai: The Bansal Murders had its world premiere at the 56th International Film Festival of India (IFFI) in Goa on 21 November 2025, where it was screened as a gala premiere.

Following its screening at the festival, the film was released on Netflix on 19 December 2025.

== Reception ==
On the review aggregator website Rotten Tomatoes, 80% of 15 critics' reviews are positive, with an average rating of 7.3/10.

Rahul Desai of The Hollywood Reporter India stated that "It is a whodunit worth the wait and A Cleverly Calibrated Crime Thriller." Rishabh Suri of Hindustan Times gave 3 stars out of 5 and said that "Overall, even when it stumbles, Raat Akeli Hai 2 remains compelling. There was scope to make it an even darker investigation drama. But a solid cast and a neatly resolved climax make it a worthy follow-up in spirit, if not in structure." Anuj Kumar of The Hindu stated that " director Honey Trehan crafts a mystery that intertwines crime and social commentary. Though uneven in pacing, the film deftly examines the intersection of entitlement and morality in society."

Rashmi Vasudeva of Deccan Herald rated it 3/5 stars and said that "The film plays out largely as a procedural, but the nervous unpredictability that made the first edition so compelling is sorely missed." Shubhra Gupta of The Indian Express gave 2.5/5 stars and writes that "The best written character remains Nawazuddin Siddiqui's Jatil, still moving his mouth in the way he did in the first film, as the moral centre of the film." Nandini Ramnath of Scroll.in feels that "The new movie doesn’t have the potency of its predecessor, or the atmospheric visuals that suggested perverse deeds unfolding in dark corners."

Bollywood Hungama rated it 2.5/5 stars and said that "On the whole, RAAT AKELI HAI: THE BANSAL MURDERS works in parts, mainly because the climax is unpredictable, while the performances of Nawazuddin Siddiqui and Revathy stand out. However, the film suffers due to uneven writing and execution. An average fare, at best." Devesh Sharma of Filmfare gave 3.5 stars out of 5 and said that " It is a sobering, intelligent thriller that confirms this franchise is less about murder mysteries and more about the moral loneliness of those who choose to see clearly." Archika Khurana of The Times of India rayed it 3/5 stars and said that "A sincere, slow-burn sequel elevated by Nawazuddin Siddiqui, but short on the tension that made the original memorable." Lachmi Deb Roy of Firstpost gave 4 stars out of 5 and said that "Netflix’s ‘Raat Akeli Hai’ 2 doesn’t divert from keeping the writing immersive and the best part of this film is that it never thins down.
