= Aditya Kripalani =

Indian filmmaker, writer, musician and producer

- Born: 20 October 1981 (age 44); Pune, Maharashtra, India
- Education: Film and Television Institute of India
- Occupations: Film director, writer, producer

Aditya Kripalani (born 20 October 1981) is an Indian filmmaker, writer, musician and producer. He is known for directing films such as Tikli and Laxmi Bomb, Tottaa Pataaka Item Maal, Devi Aur Hero, Not Today, and Main Actor Nahin Hoon.

== Early life and career ==
Kripalani was born in Pune, Maharashtra, India. He studied at the Film and Television Institute of India. Before entering filmmaking, he worked in advertising with agencies Lintas, JWT Singapore, Leo Burnett, Kuala Lumpur and McCann Singapore.

He made his directorial debut with Tikli and Laxmi Bomb (2017), which received recognition at the Berlin Independent Film Festival and the UK Asian Film Festival. His subsequent film Tottaa Pataaka Item Maal (2018) was screened at the Garden State Film Festival and Kala Ghoda Film Festival. In 2019, he directed Devi Aur Hero, which won the NETPAC Award at the Kolkata International Film Festival.

His film Not Today (2021) received the FIPRESCI award at the Bengaluru International Film Festival. In 2026, he directed Main Actor Nahin Hoon, starring Nawazuddin Siddiqui.

Apart from filmmaking, Kripalani has written novels including Back Seat, Front Seat, and Tikli and Laxmi Bomb.

== Filmography ==
Year	Film	Language	Notes
2017	Tikli and Laxmi Bomb	Hindi	Directorial debut
2019	Tottaa Pataaka Item Maal	Hindi	
2019	Devi Aur Hero	Hindi	
2021	Not Today	Hindi	
2026	Main Actor Nahin Hoon	Hindi	
