= Main Actor Nahin Hoon =

2025 Indian drama film

- Theatrical release poster
- Directed by: Aditya Kripalani
- Written by: Aditya Kripalani
- Produced by: Sweta Chhabria Kripalani; Aditya Kripalani; Faizuddin Siddiqui
- Starring: Nawazuddin Siddiqui; Chitrangada Satarupa
- Cinematography: Rishika Baruah; Sumit Singh; Ajinkya Pandit
- Edited by: Hrishikesh Petwe
- Music by: Score: Aditi Ramesh; Amlan Ray
- Production companies: Mumba Devi Motion Pictures; Side Hero Entertainment
- Distributed by: Platoon Distribution (India)
- Release dates: 16 March 2025 (US); 7 November 2025 (U.K.); 8 May 2026 (India)
- Running time: 121 minutes
- Country: India
- Language: Hindi

Main Actor Nahin Hoon (transl. I am not an Actor) is a 2025 Indian Hindi-language drama film written and directed by Aditya Kripalani. The film stars Nawazuddin Siddiqui and Chitrangada Satarupa.

The film was theatrically released in India on 8 May 2026.

== Plot ==
The film follows a struggling actor in Mumbai who connects with a retired banker based in Frankfurt through online acting sessions. As their interactions deepen, they confront personal struggles, emotional challenges, and cultural differences while forming an unexpected bond across continents.

== Cast ==
- Nawazuddin Siddiqui as Adnan Baig
- Chitrangada Satarupa as Mouni Roy

== Production ==
The film is written and directed by Aditya Kripalani. It is produced by Kripalani along with Sweta Chhabria Kripalani and Faizuddin Siddiqui, with Nawazuddin Siddiqui also serving as a producer.

The film was shot simultaneously across India and Germany, with both actors performing in real time through video calls during production.

== Soundtrack ==
The music of the film is composed by Aditi Ramesh, Amlan Ray and Rabbi Shergill.

== Release ==
The film I'm Not an Actor had its world premiere at the Cinequest Film Festival on 16 and 18 March 2025 at Hammer Theatre Center and the California Theatre, respectively.

It also had its United Kingdom premiere at the opening night of the Bradford International Film Festival (BRADIFF) on 28 October 2025 at the Pictureville Cinema. The film was released theatrically across the United Kingdom on 7 November 2025.

Main Actor Nahin Hoon was theatrical release in India on 8 May 2026.

== Reception ==
Devesh Sharma of Filmfare gave it 3.5 out of 5 stars and wrote that the film was "deeply attuned to the emotional architecture of contemporary loneliness". Sreeju Sudhakaran of Rediff.com also gave it 3.5 out of 5 stars, calling it an "intimate and quietly unsettling character study" powered by its two lead performances. Aishani Biswas of Outlook India rated it 3.5 out of 5 stars and wrote that the film succeeded emotionally despite an uneven narrative structure, while praising Satarupa's performance. Zinia Bandyopadhyay of Firstpost gave the film 3.5 out of 5 stars, writing that it was "worth experiencing" for viewers receptive to its introspective style. Rishabh Suri of Hindustan Times rated it 3 out of 5 stars and wrote that it stood out for its honest depiction of loneliness and ambition.

Rahul Desai of The Hollywood Reporter India called the film "an extended audition tape" and found it "dull and distant". Shreyas Pande of The Hindu wrote that the film was filled with heavy-handed conversations that disrupted its minimalistic design. Kartik Bhardwaj of The New Indian Express rated it 2.5 out of 5 stars, writing that although the film explored the craft of acting, its characters seemed "surface level". Renuka Vyavahare of The Times of India also rated it 2.5 out of 5 stars and described it as an indie conversational drama that "digs deep but struggles to engage". Bollywood Hungama rated it 2 out of 5 stars, praising the premise and performances by Siddiqui and Satarupa while criticising the final act and ending.

== Accolades ==
Year	Award	Category	Recipients	Result	Ref.
2025	New York Indian Film Festival	Best Actor	Nawazuddin Siddiqui	Won	
