= Nawazuddin Siddiqui =

Indian actor (born 1974)

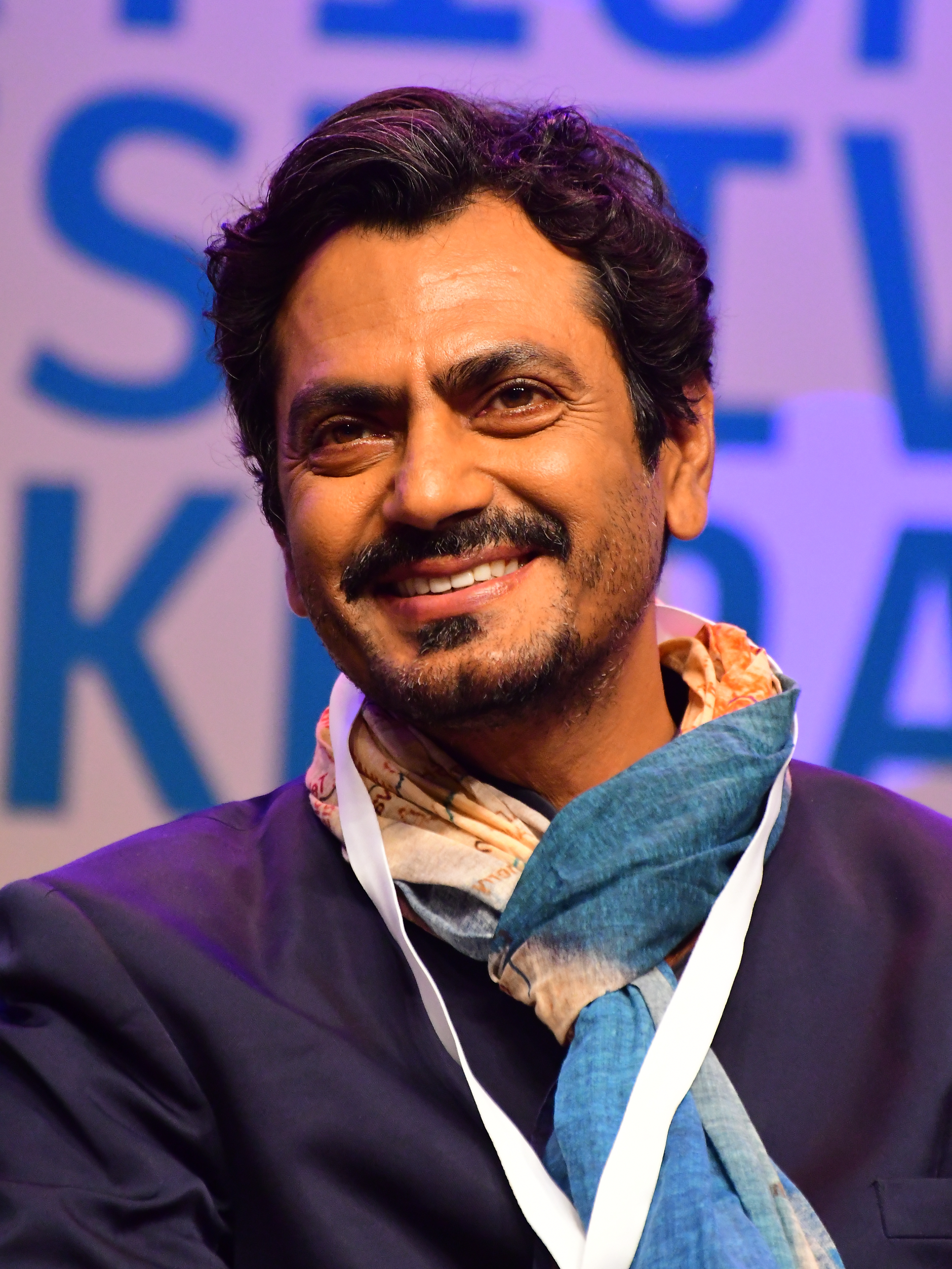
- Siddiqui in 2021
- Born: 19 May 1974 (age 52); Budhana, Uttar Pradesh, India
- Education: National School of Drama; Gurukula Kangri University
- Occupation: Actor
- Years active: 1999–present
- Works: Full list
- Spouse: Aaliya Siddiqui (m. 2009)
- Children: 2
- Awards: Full list

Nawazuddin Siddiqui ([nəˈwaːzʊdːiːn sɪdːiːqi:]; born 19 May 1974) is an Indian actor known for his work in Hindi cinema. He is the recipient of various accolades, including a National Film Award, an IIFA Award, and two Filmfare Awards, as well as a nomination for an International Emmy. After studying acting at the National School of Drama, Siddiqui had minor roles in films such as Sarfarosh (1999), Shool (1999), and Munna Bhai M.B.B.S (2003).

Siddiqui first gained recognition for his role in Anurag Kashyap's Black Friday (2004) and the 2012 Gangs of Wasseypur duology. Further success came for his supporting roles in The Lunchbox (2013), for which he won a Filmfare Award for Best Supporting Actor; Kick (2014); and Bajrangi Bhaijaan (2015). He went on to gain critical acclaim for his roles in Raman Raghav 2.0 (2016), Raees (2017), Mom (2017), and Manto (2018).

He has also starred in two Emmy-nominated series, Sacred Games (2018–2019) and the British McMafia (2018).

== Early life ==
Siddiqui was born on 19 May 1974 in Budhana, a small town in Muzaffarnagar district, Uttar Pradesh, India, into a zamindari Muslim family of Lambardars. He is the eldest of eight siblings. He spent most of his youth in Uttarakhand.

He graduated with a Bachelor of Science in chemistry from Gurukul Kangri University in Haridwar. Following this, he worked as a chemist in Vadodara for a year before leaving for Delhi in search of a new job. Once there, he was drawn to acting after watching a play. In pursuit of securing admission to the National School of Drama (NSD) in New Delhi, he acted in over ten plays with a group of friends, including one in Dehradun, to fulfill one of the criteria for admission.

== Career ==
=== 1999–2012: Early work and recognition ===
Siddiqui went to the National School of Drama in New Delhi. After graduating in 1999, he moved to Mumbai.

He made his Bollywood debut in the year 1999 with a small role in the Aamir Khan starrer Sarfarosh. He then appeared in Ram Gopal Varma's 1999 film Shool and the 2000 film Jungle, as well as Rajkumar Hirani's Munnabhai MBBS (2003). After moving to Mumbai, he tried to get work in television serials but did not achieve much success. He did a short film, The Bypass, in 2003, where he appeared with Irrfan Khan. Beyond that, between 2002 and 2005, he was largely out of work and lived in a flat that he shared with four other people, surviving by conducting occasional acting workshops. In 2004, which was one of the worst years of his struggle, Siddiqui couldn't pay rent. He asked an NSD senior if he could stay with him. The senior allowed him to share his apartment in Goregaon suburb if he was willing to cook meals for him.

Between 2004 and 2007, Siddiqui had a few minor roles, including in the film Black Friday, which came out in 2007 and was a nominee for the Golden Leopard. In 2009, he appeared in a cameo role in the song "Emotional Atyachar" in the movie Dev D, playing the role of Rangila. He performed a duet with Rasila (known together as Patna ke Presley). In the same year, he appeared in New York. However, it was his role of a journalist in Anusha Rizvi's 2010 film Peepli Live, that first got him wide recognition as an actor. In 2012, he appeared in Prashant Bhargava's Patang: The Kite, which premiered at the Berlin International Film Festival and the Tribeca Film Festival. Siddiqui's performance was praised by film critic Roger Ebert, who stated that the role "transformed his acting style" and he awarded the actor the 'Thumbsup Trophy'. The film was subsequently released in the U.S. and Canada and garnered much attention, with rave reviews from The New York Times.

=== 2012–present: Mainstream success ===
Siddiqui then appeared in the 2012 film Kahaani, in which he played the archetypal short-tempered intelligence officer Khan. Anurag Kashyap's gangster epic Gangs of Wasseypur followed, which furthered the actor's fame. He played his first primary role as Sonu Duggal in Ashim Ahluwalia's Miss Lovely, which premiered at the 2012 Cannes Film Festival, a role Siddiqui describes as his "most real performance so far". Siddiqui then followed this with the sequel to Gangs of Wasseypur. In 2013, he played the lead role in the horror flick Aatma. The Lunchbox premiered as part of the Critics' Week section at the 2013 Cannes Film Festival and won him multiple awards. He appeared in Aamir Khan's 2012 release Talaash. He received the Special Jury Award at the 2012 National Film Awards and the Filmfare Award for Best Supporting Actor in 2013 for The Lunchbox. In 2014, he played the lead antagonist Shiv Gajra in the blockbuster Kick.

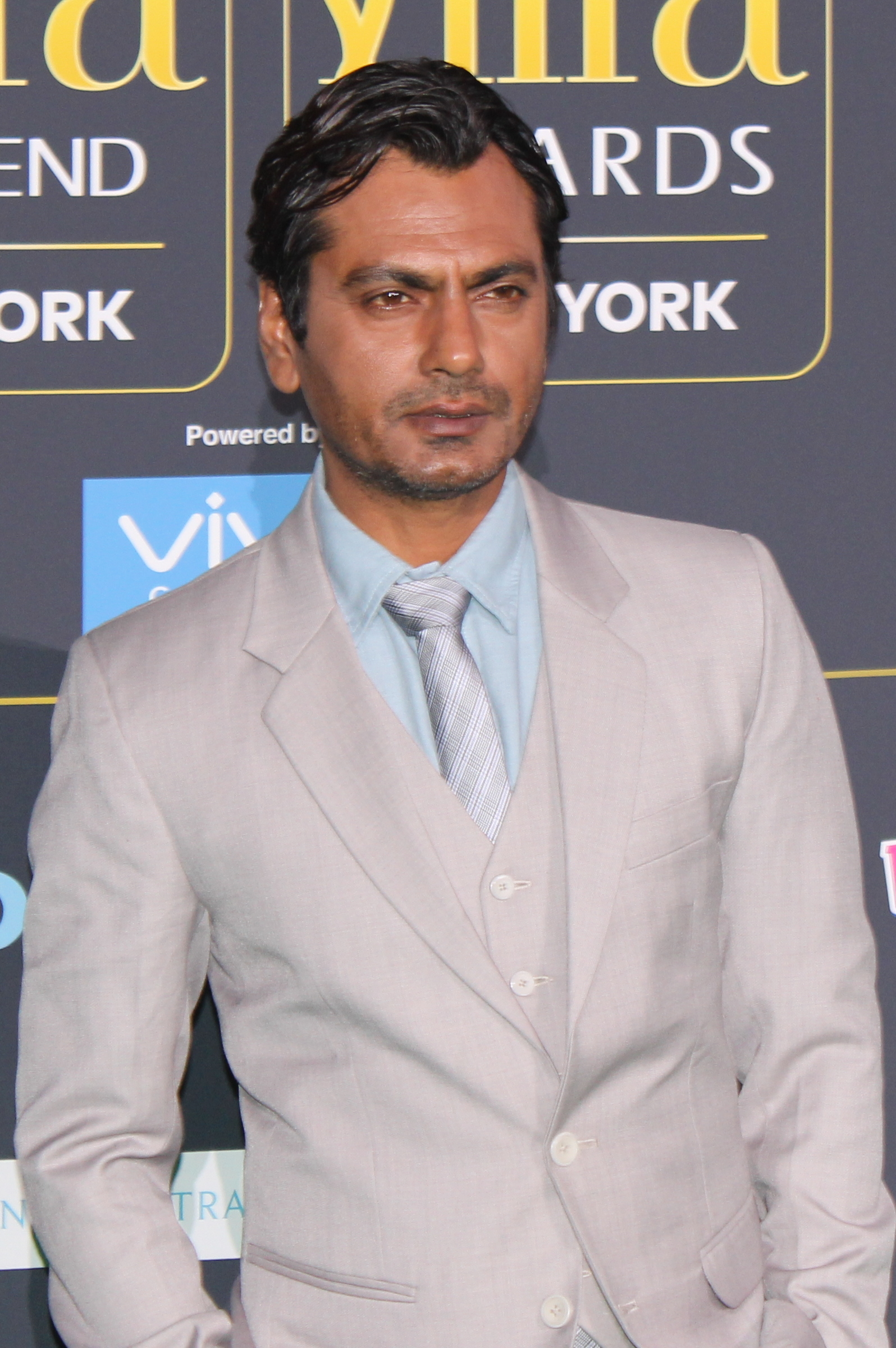
Siddiqui at the 18th IIFA Awards (2017)

In 2015, Siddiqui's films Bajrangi Bhaijaan and Manjhi – The Mountain Man were released, and he was praised for his roles. His work in Raman Raghav 2.0 in 2016 won him the Fancine Malaga Award in Spain and in the Asia Pacific Screen Awards, both in the category of Best Actor. The 2018 film Manto, based on the life of Urdu author Saadat Hasan Manto, won him Best Actor at the 2018 Asia Pacific Screen Awards.

In 2018, Siddiqui starred alongside Saif Ali Khan in Netflix's first original Indian series, Sacred Games, based on Vikram Chandra's novel of the same name.

In 2021, he was seen in the American-Bangladeshi-Indian film No Land's Man.

In 2022, Siddiqui appeared in Heropanti 2.

In 2023, he starred in Afwaah alongside Bhumi Pednekar, in Jogira Sara Ra Ra opposite Neha Sharma, and in Kangana Ranaut's Tiku Weds Sheru, opposite Avneet Kaur.

In 2025, he starred in the Maddock Films production Thamma, alongside Ayushmann Khurrana, Rashmika Mandanna, and Paresh Rawal. He later reprised his role as Inspector Jatil Yadav in the crime thriller Raat Akeli Hai: The Bansal Murders, a sequel to 2020's Raat Akeli Hai. The film, directed by Honey Trehan and written by Smita Singh, premiered at the 56th International Film Festival of India in Goa before its global release by Netflix on 19 December 2025. In 2026, Siddiqui starred in Main Actor Nahin Hoon, directed by Aditya Kripalani. He is now set to star in the web-series Dr. Hassan, a remake of the television series House.

== Personal life ==
Siddiqui has been married twice. In his youth, he dated a woman named Anjali, who grew up in the same village as him; the couple broke up in 2009. In 2010 or 2011, he married a woman named Sheeba. By 2012, he was dating an American woman named Suzanne. He also had a brief relationship with Niharika Singh, a former Miss India, with whom he co-starred in two films.

Siddiqui eventually reconnected with Anjali, and the couple married and had two children, a daughter and a son. At this point, Anjali took the name Aaliya Siddiqui. In May 2020, Aaliya announced on social media that she was seeking a divorce from Nawazuddin.

Siddiqui lives in Mumbai with his younger brother, Shamas Nawab, a film director. When not busy acting, he likes to spend time in his hometown of Budhana, where he owns a farm. In a May 2021 interview, he said that he spends most of his time there.

== Accolades ==
Siddiqui's first lead role in a feature film was in Prashant Bhargava's Patang, which premiered at the Berlin Film Festival, in which his performance has been praised by film critic Roger Ebert (awarding the film 4/4 stars), who stated that the role "transformed his acting style".

Siddiqui was awarded the Special Jury Award at the 60th National Film Awards 2012 for his work in the films Kahaani, Gangs of Wasseypur, Dekh Indian Circus, and Talaash.
