= Manto (2018 film) =

2018 Indian biographical drama film

- Promotional poster
- Directed by: Nandita Das
- Written by: Nandita Das
- Produced by: Vikrant Batra; Ajit Andhare; Namrata Goyal; Nandita Das; Sameer Dixit; Jatish Varma
- Starring: Nawazuddin Siddiqui; Tahir Raj Bhasin; Rasika Dugal; Rajshri Deshpande
- Cinematography: Kartik Vijay
- Edited by: A. Sreekar Prasad
- Music by: Songs; Sneha Khanwalkar; Raftaar; Background Score; Zakir Hussain
- Production companies: HP Studios; FilmStoc; Viacom18 Motion Pictures; Nandita Das Initiatives LLP
- Distributed by: Viacom18 Motion Pictures
- Release dates: 13 May 2018 (Cannes); 21 September 2018 (India)
- Running time: 116 minutes
- Country: India
- Languages: Hindi; Urdu
- Box office: ₹3.71 crore

Manto is a 2018 Indian Hindi-language biographical drama film based on the life of the prominent Urdu author Saadat Hasan Manto, written and directed by Nandita Das. The film stars Nawazuddin Siddiqui in the title character of Indo-Pakistani, author and writer Saadat Hasan Manto. Tahir Raj Bhasin plays the 1940s Hindi film superstar Shyam. Shyam was Manto's friend, confidant, and inspiration for a number of stories. Rasika Dugal plays the role of Manto's wife, Safia. Manto is based on the 1940s post-Independence period of India. The film earned seven nominations at 64th Filmfare Awards including Best Film Critics, Best Actor Critics for Siddiqui.

The poster of the film was unveiled at the 2017 Cannes Film Festival. Das made a short film titled In Defence of Freedom, also starring Nawazuddin in the main role, and was released on YouTube on 23 March 2017. The film premiered at the 2018 Cannes Film Festival and released in Indian theatres on 21 September 2018. It was made as a prelude to the feature film. The film has multiple producers such as HP Studios, Filmstoc, Nandita Das and Viacom18 Motion Pictures.

Manto was the first film to be produced under Nandita Das Initiatives LLP, a film production company founded by Nandita Das in 2016.

== Plot ==
Manto is employed as a screenwriter for the Bollywood industry in the year 1946 at Bombay when India was going through its independence struggle and the process of partition. He may have been in ideological disagreement with the Progressive Writers’ Association, but he kept very close contacts with the association members like the writer Ismat Chughtai who was also involved in an obscenity case alongside him. He had close contact with actors Shyam Chadda and Ashok Kumar.

Soon after, India gains independence on 15 August 1947 and the new nation of Pakistan is born. Safia leaves for Lahore to attend her sister's wedding. Despite flaring Hindu-Muslim tensions, Manto decides to stay back in his beloved city of Bombay. One day, Shyam, on hearing that his family was forced to flee Pakistan because of a Muslim mob attack, tells Manto in anger: "I could have even killed you." Shocked and anguished, a non-practicing Muslim, Manto suddenly becomes conscious of his religious identity and the vulnerabilities that come with it. He impulsively makes the unimaginable decision of moving to Pakistan.

Lahore, 1948: A melancholic city full of refugees, forsaken property, and burnt buildings devoid of hope becomes Manto's new home. He is left grappling with a growing sense of isolation and a deep sense of betrayal. As he struggles to come to terms with his new reality, he spirals into a state of perpetual drunkenness. Though Safia continues to stand by him, their marriage begins to feel the strain. Relentless and long-drawn court trials alleging obscenity in his story Thanda Gosht (literal meaning: Cold Meat) take a severe toll on his health and finances. His statement in defense of literature and free speech is met with conviction. Despite this, he continues to pen some of his sharpest and most courageous works.

His compulsions to write and drink are in direct conflict with his desire to see his family - his wife and two daughters, happy and secure. His failing health makes him hallucinate. Unable to see his family suffer any longer, he finally admits himself into the alcohol rehabilitation center at Lahore Mental Hospital.

The main narrative is seamlessly juxtaposed with five of his poignant stories. The last one being his most famous story - Toba Tek Singh. Manto begins the story with, "two or three years after Partition, it occurred to the governments of India and Pakistan to exchange their lunatics like they had exchanged their criminals. The Muslim lunatics in India were to be sent to Pakistan and the Hindu lunatics in Pakistani asylums were to be handed over to India." The Sikh protagonist, who has vowed to remain standing until he finds his village, lies in death in no-man's land, between the two nations. Manto's predicament is not too different.

== Cast ==
- Nawazuddin Siddiqui as Saadat Hasan Manto
- Rasika Dugal as Safia Manto
- Tahir Raj Bhasin as Shyam
- Feryna Wazheir as Nargis
- Nancy Thakkar as Suraiya
- Javed Akhtar as Abid Ali Abid
- Chandan Roy Sanyal as Ahmed Nadeem Qasmi
- Vinod Nagpal as Bishan Singh
- Rishi Kapoor as Film Producer
- Inaamulhaq as Hamid
- Ranvir Shorey as Ishar Singh
- Rajshri Deshpande as Ismat Chugtai
- Ila Arun as Jaddanbai
- Divya Dutta as Kulwant Kaur
- Paresh Rawal as Pimp
- Tillotama Shome as Prostitute
- Vijay Varma as Ansaar Shabnam Dil
- Saharsh Kumar Shukla
- Shashank Arora as Shaad Amritsari
- Gurdas Maan as Sirajuddin
- Danish Husain as Asad Zaidi
- Bhanu Uday as Ashok Kumar
- Madhurjeet Sarghi as Nasira Iqbal
- Ashwath Bhatt as Prosecutor Qasim
- Atul Kumar as Shahid Latif

== Production ==
=== Background ===
Saadat Hasan Manto's (1912–1955) short stories set during the devastating partition of the Indian subcontinent were his defining works. These irreverent, unflinching but deeply humane stories, earned him the wrath of the British Indian government and later of Pakistan. The stories were deemed obscene by the courts and he spent his last years fighting legal battles to defend his right to write. Today, his work is seen by both scholars and the reading public as one of the most authentic and independent accounts of the human tragedy of those years.

=== Casting ===
In November 2015, it was reported that Nandita Das had approached actor Irrfan Khan to play the leading role in her film Manto. Nandita said that, "Irrfan fits the role to the T as he speaks fluent Urdu, looks a lot like Manto and, above all, is a wonderful actor. He has read a lot of Manto himself and is influenced by him." In May 2016, during the 69th Cannes Film Festival Nandita announced that Nawazuddin Siddiqui had been finalized for the central role of Manto in her next film. Nandita said that, "I have had Nawazuddin in mind from the very outset, but in India, economics always interferes with art and there was pressure on me to cast a more mainstream star."

=== Filming ===
The film was shot on various locations across Mumbai and the Lahore portions were shot in the village called Vaso (Nadiad) in Gujarat. The shooting continued for 41 days before reaching its endpoint in July 2017.

== Release ==
It was selected to compete in the Un Certain Regard section at the 2018 Cannes Film Festival. The official teaser of the film was released on 12 May 2018. The trailer of film was released on 14 August 2018.

== Soundtrack ==
The music of the film is composed by Sneha Khanwalkar and Raftaar while the lyrics have been penned by Dibakar Banerjee, Simaab Akbarabadi, Meeraji, Faiz Ahmed Faiz, Raftaar and Saadat Hasan Manto. The first song of the film titled as "Nagri Nagri" sung by Shankar Mahadevan was released 31 August 2018. The album was released by Zee Music Company on 9 September 2018.

Nandita Das had asked Khanwalkar not to use any electronic music. Moreover, the composer was asked to compose songs from poems of 1940s and 50s. Three poems were chosen for this. The song "Ban Titli" was made by the composer for a Dibakar Banerjee-project which was cancelled.

== Reception ==
On the review aggregator website Rotten Tomatoes, 74% of 19 critics' reviews are positive, with an average rating of 6.1/10.

=== Accolades ===
Year	Award	Category	Recipient(s)	Result	Ref(s)
2018	Asia Pacific Screen Awards	Best Actor	Nawazuddin Siddiqui	Won	
2018	Asia Pacific Screen Awards	FIAPF Award	Nandita Das	Won	
2018	Cannes Film Festival	Un Certain Regard Award	Nandita Das	Nominated	
2018	Toronto International Film Festival	People's Choice Award	Nandita Das	Nominated	
2019	Filmfare Awards	Best Film (Critics)	Nandita Das	Nominated	
2019	Filmfare Awards	Best Screenplay	Nandita Das	Nominated	
2019	Filmfare Awards	Best Dialogue	Nandita Das	Nominated	
2019	Filmfare Awards	Best Actor (Critics)	Nawazuddin Siddiqui	Nominated	
2019	Filmfare Awards	Best Cinematography	Kartik Vijay	Nominated	
2019	Filmfare Awards	Best Production Design	Rita Ghosh	Nominated	
2019	Filmfare Awards	Best Costume Design	Sheetal Sharma	Won	

== See also ==
- Manto (2015 film), Pakistani biographical film on the writer
- List of Bollywood films of 2018
