= Raat Akeli Hai =

2020 Indian Hindi-language crime drama film

- Netflix release poster
- Directed by: Honey Trehan
- Written by: Smita Singh
- Produced by: Abhishek Chaubey; Ronnie Screwvala; Sooraj Gautam
- Starring: Nawazuddin Siddiqui; Radhika Apte; Shweta Tripathi; Aditya Srivastava; Tigmanshu Dhulia; Shivani Raghuvanshi
- Cinematography: Pankaj Kumar
- Edited by: A. Sreekar Prasad
- Music by: Songs: Sneha Khanwalkar; Score: Karan Kulkarni
- Production companies: RSVP Movies; Macguffin Pictures
- Distributed by: Netflix
- Release date: 31 July 2020
- Running time: 149 minutes
- Country: India
- Language: Hindi

Raat Akeli Hai (transl. The Night Is Lonely) is a 2020 Indian Hindi-language crime thriller film directed by Honey Trehan. The film stars Nawazuddin Siddiqui, Radhika Apte, Shweta Tripathi, Tigmanshu Dhulia, Shivani Raghuvanshi, Nishant Dahiya, Gyanendra Tripathi, Ila Arun, Swanand Kirkire, Nitesh Kumar Tiwari, and Aditya Srivastava. It follows a small-town cop who is summoned to investigate the death of an elderly family member. The film was released on Netflix on 31 July 2020.

The film received critical acclaim for the cast performances and direction, with Siddiqui winning the award for Best Actor at the Filmfare OTT Awards while the film also won Best Film at the ceremony.

A sequel titled Raat Akeli Hai: The Bansal Murders was released in 2025.

== Plot ==
In a remote area of Uttar Pradesh, a truck runs a car off the road, and the truck driver brutally murders the car's occupants – a woman and her driver. He takes the bodies to a tannery and burns them with acid, but accidentally spills the acid on one of his own hands.

Five years later, Sub-Inspector Jatil Yadav is frustrated by his mother's incessant attempts to arrange a marriage for him. While attending a colleague's wedding, Jatil is summoned to investigate the murder of a wealthy aristocrat named Raghuveer Singh. Jatil learns that Raghuveer was murdered with his own gun on his wedding night and is further intrigued by the family's reticence on the matter. Jatil is introduced to the family by Ramesh Chauhan, the brother of Raghuveer Singh's first wife (who was murdered five years earlier). Members of Raghuveer's family include his two children, Karuna and Karan; his sister-in-law and the matriarch of the house, Pramila Singh; her children, Vikram and Vasudha; Ravi Sisodia, the volatile husband of Karuna; the household maid, Chunni; and Raghuveer's young bride-to-be, Radha. As Jatil begins his investigation, he finds that Raghuveer's family are a complicated group with their own secrets and lies.

During the course of his investigation, Jatil observes that the rest of the family resent Radha (who was previously Raghuveer's mistress) and treat her as an outsider. Jatil recalls a previous incident in which he stopped Radha from committing suicide by jumping from a moving train. Jatil develops a soft spot for Radha. He learns that Vikram, who is engaged to the daughter of the powerful MLA Munna Raja, discovered the body. Radha tells Jatil that she was in love with Vikram and planned to elope with him, but he merely used and discarded her once the opportunity arose to become involved with Munna Raja's daughter.

Jatil finds erotic magazines and photographs of women in Raghuveer's cupboard, revealing him to be a serial abuser. Jatil's investigative methods lead to conflict with Ravi, who brings Munna Raja into the matter. Jatil also encounters Chunni's grandmother, who has become senile after her son (the family's driver) was murdered five years earlier and the case was closed without investigation. Jatil digs into the cold case, leading him to a tannery in Jajmau operated by a menacing butcher, but secretly owned by Munna Raja. Despite pressure from his politically connected superior, Jatil continues his investigation, unravelling the many rivalries and disagreements among the various family members.

The following morning, Chunni is found strangled to death in the mansion's backyard. Jatil's superiors order Radha's arrest, but Jatil, now convinced of her innocence, rescues her from the mansion. The butcher from Jajmau catches up with them on a train, but Jatil and Radha manage to throw him off during the ensuing scuffle and injure him. While Jatil and Radha make their way to Raghuveer's farmhouse in Gwalior, where he used to bring the women with whom he was involved, forensic analysis concludes that Chunni's killer is a man with burnt skin and scars on his hands.

Jatil's colleague Nandu sees a man matching the description of Chunni's killer at the police station with Munna Raja. Becoming convinced that Jatil's theory about Radha's innocence is correct, he visits Chunni's grandmother and shows her a photograph of the butcher. Jatil confronts Radha about the scarf he found in Raghuveer's room, and she reveals that she had planned to expose her affair with Vikram to Raghuveer and dragged him to the old man's bedroom, only to find Raghuveer already dead. Vikram then obscured the timeline and tampered with the evidence with Chunni's help, presumably to frame Radha. Jatil hands Radha over to another police station to placate his superiors.

Jatil tracks down a medical report stating that an abortion had been performed on Raghuveer's first wife one day before her death. Following this lead, he discovers numerous inconsistencies in the way her death was reported and investigated. Returning to the farmhouse, he finds that Raghuveer's wife had kept records of the women he brought there. He also finds the same erotic magazine, photographs, and a boarding school badge. Elsewhere, Munna Raja and Jatil's superior decide to eliminate Radha under the pretence of transferring her from one station to another, but Jatil anticipates the plot. During the ensuing shoot-out, Munna Raja's goons are killed and Radha suffers a minor wound, but the butcher escapes. Upon returning to Jajmau, Chunni's grandmother douses him in fuel and sets him on fire, killing him.

Jatil returns to the mansion with Radha in tow and explains the chain of events: the butcher killed Raghuveer's wife and her driver (Chunni's father) five years earlier on Munna Raja's orders, after being persuaded by Pramila. Raghuveer's wife had discovered that he was serially raping Vasudha, resulting in her abortion and expulsion from school. Pramila then had Raghuveer's wife murdered to prevent scandal and possibly to stop Raghuveer from removing her children from his will. Pramila brokers a deal with Munna Raja to have the lion's share of Raghuveer's properties transferred to her family.

On the night of the wedding, Vasudha confronted Raghuveer, only for him to dismiss and insult her. In a fit of rage, she murdered her uncle with his own gun. Afterwards, she exchanged her blood-soaked scarf with Radha's, something Jatil noticed in the wedding video. Confronted with the truth, Vikram shuns both his mother and Munna Raja in disgust, breaking off the engagement. Pramila goes to her room to kill herself in order to avoid arrest. She hears someone entering the room and asks whether it is Vikram. Vasudha replies that it is her. Pramila puts down the gun. A gunshot is then heard. At her cremation, Vasudha confirms that Jatil's account of the events is true.

After the case is solved, an investigation is opened into the involvement of Munna Raja and Jatil's superior, SP Lalji Shukla. Meanwhile, Jatil returns home to further pestering from his insistent mother. It is then revealed, through his mother reading the newspaper, that the official story is that Pramila killed herself, while Vasudha is not mentioned. His mother then asks about "the other girl". Fed up, Jatil catches up with Radha's train as she prepares to leave town and tells her, "It's a cruel world out there; I can't handle it by myself."

== Cast ==
- Nawazuddin Siddiqui as Inspector Jatil Yadav
- Radhika Apte as Radha
- Shweta Tripathi as Karuna Singh
- Gyanendra Tripathi as Ravi Sisodia
- Tigmanshu Dhulia as Senior SP Lalji Shukla (IPS)
- Shivani Raghuvanshi as Vasudha Singh
- Aditya Srivastava as M.L.A. Munna Raja
- Nishant Dahiya as Vikram Singh
- Padmavati Rao as Pramila Singh
- Ila Arun as Sarita Kumari, Jatil's mother
- Swanand Kirkire as Ramesh Chauhan
- Shree Dhar Dubey as Narendra Singh/ Nandu
- Ravi Sah as Truck Driver / Keval
- Khalid Tyabji as Raghuveer Singh
- Riya Shukla as Chunni

== Reception ==
On the review aggregator website Rotten Tomatoes, 100% of 11 critics' reviews are positive, with an average rating of 7.5/10.

Saibal Chatterjee of NDTV gave four stars out of five and said, "The film does to the crime and punishment genre what Bulbbul did to the supernatural revenge fantasy - lifts it many notches above the ordinary." Shubhra Gupta of The Indian Express gave three stars out of five and said, "A few of the bits and pieces in Netflix's Raat Akeli Hai feel a bit contrived, but not enough to take the enjoyment away from a film which has a terrific sense of time and place, and a crime in which everyone has stakes." Komal Nahta of Film Information said, "It's a well-made and well-enacted whodunit. However, the last about half an hour seems rather implausible and, therefore, is not as exciting as it should’ve been." Rohan Naahar of Hindustan Times said, "Raat Akeli Hai is quite the achievement. Trehan not only has a skill for directing actors, but also displays a command over tone and visual texture."

== Soundtrack ==
Raat Akeli Hai

Soundtrack album by Sneha Khanwalkar
- Released: 28 August 2020
- Recorded: 2019
- Genre: Feature film soundtrack
- Length: 13:00
- Language: Hindi
- Label: Zee Music Company

Sneha Khanwalkar chronology
Ghoomketu (2020)	Raat Akeli Hai (2020)	Sharmaji Namkeen (2022)

The music for the film was composed by Sneha Khanwalkar while the lyrics written by Raj Shekhar and Swanand Kirkire.

Track listing
No.	Title	Lyrics	Singer(s)	Length
1.	"Aadhe Aadhe Se"	Raj Shekhar	Shilpa Rao, Mika Singh	6:20
2.	"Ghoom Charkheya"	Swanand Kirkire	Sukhwinder Singh	5:03
3.	"Jaago"	Swanand Kirkire	Swanand Kirkire	1:37
Total length:				13:00

== Sequel ==
In November 2025, Netflix officially announced a sequel titled Raat Akeli Hai: The Bansal Murders. Nawazuddin Siddiqui reprising his role as Inspector Jatil Yadav, who returns to probe a chilling, cold-blooded mass murder within the powerful Bansal family.
