= Dekh Indian Circus =

2011 film by Mangesh Hadawale

- Film poster
- Directed by: Mangesh Hadawale
- Story by: Mangesh Hadawale
- Produced by: Anil Lad; Mahaveer Jain; Chirag Dilip Shah
- Starring: Tannishtha Chatterjee; Nawazuddin Siddiqui; Virendra Singh Rathod; Suhani Oza
- Cinematography: Laxman Utekar
- Edited by: James J. Valiakulathil
- Music by: Shankar–Ehsaan–Loy
- Production company: Sundial Pictures
- Release date: 7 October 2011 (Busan)
- Running time: 101 minutes
- Country: India
- Languages: Hindi; Rajasthani

Dekh Indian Circus is an Indian film directed by Mangesh Hadawale. It provides an entertaining metaphor for rural India's struggle to access the supposed economic miracle of that South Asian nation. The film premiered at the 16th Busan Film Festival in the New Currents section, opening to positive reviews from critics and winning the Audience Choice award.

Nawazuddin Siddiqui and Tannishtha Chatterjee won the best actor and actress awards for this movie at the 12th annual New York Indian Film Festival (NYIFF).

== Plot ==
Kajro and Jethu are fulfilling the dream of educating their children Ghumroo and Panni. Kajro, the resilient mother, inculcates great values in her children. Jethu as the mute patriarch suffers the day-to-day heartbreaks in silence.

Set in the present-day deserts of Rajasthan, the story line is about the daily trials and tribulations of the family and depicts the aspirations of rural India. Aspirations have arrived at every doorstep, but the means are far behind.

In the backdrop of state elections, a circus has come to a nearby town that may be Panni and Ghumroo's only escapade to a fantasy world without any heartbreak. A flag on the door could be the key to this escape. Would Jethu and Kajro find it easy to see a small dream of their children come true or would they themselves become puppets in the circus of life?

== Cast ==
- Tannishtha Chatterjee as Kajaro, who lives in the rural part of the country, can be compared to the modern, urban, empowered woman of today. Her thoughts and values are deeply rooted in Indian tradition and culture. From a very young age she has been independent and strong willed.
- Nawazuddin Siddiqui as Jethu, belongs to the ‘Rabari’ community of Rajasthan. He resembles the ‘son of the soil’. His community comes under the broad classification of the nomadic tribe that moves from place to place. Jethu is a very loving and caring husband and a father. He and Kajaro were childhood sweethearts, and he has tremendous faith and trust in her.
- Virendra Singh Rathod as Ghumroo: the seven-year-old child of Jethu and Kajaro. He is mostly in his school uniform or the Rabari costume. He also sports some Rabari accessories. He has big bright eyes. They reflect honesty and purity. They are deep and intense and are a mirror of his soul that is equally pure and genuine.
- Suhani Oza as Panni, the five-year-old daughter of Kajaro and Jethu. She resembles her mother in many ways especially the sharp features. Panni is a cute and an innocent-looking girl. She exudes sweetness from the way she talks and childlike mannerisms.

== Music ==
The soundtrack of the film is composed by Shankar–Ehsaan–Loy, while the lyrics are penned by Prasoon Joshi. The score is done by Wayne Sharp.

Dekh Indian Circus: Original Motion Picture Soundtrack
No.	Title	Singer(s)	Length
1.	"Lambuda Kakka"	Rasika Shekar
2.	"Dekh Indian Circus"	Kailash Kher

== Reception ==
The film received overwhelmingly positive reviews from the critics. Richard Kuipers of Variety praised it for "bringing the themes of inequality and class divisions together in the highly entertaining visit to the big top." Kirk Honeycutt in his review for The Hollywood Reporter, praised director Mangesh Hadawale for portraying third-world issues through a family comedy that contains a stinging satire of contemporary India and its rampant corruption.

== Awards ==
12th New York Indian Film Festival

- Won- Best Actor - Nawazuddin Siddiqui
- Won- Best Actress - Tannishtha Chatterjee

16th Busan International Film Festival

- Won- Audience Choice Award

60th National Film Awards

- Won- National Film Award for Best Children's Film
- Won- National Film Award for Best Child Artist - Virendrasingh Rathore
- Won- National Film Award – Special Jury Award (feature film) - Nawazuddin Siddiqui
- Won- National Film Award – Special Mention (Feature Film) - Tannishtha Chatterjee
