= List of Hindi films of 2023 =

2023 Hindi flims

This is a list of Hindi cinema films released in 2023.

== Box office collection ==
The following is the list of highest-grossing Hindi films released in 2023. The rank of the films in the following table depends on the estimate of worldwide collections as reported by organizations classified as green by Wikipedia. (Note: See WP:RSP, WP:ICTFSOURCES) There is no official tracking of domestic box office figures within India.

Highest grossing Hindi cinema films of 2023
Rank (Note: Sorted based on the lowest value when figures are presented as a range, and for the same value, the older item is given a higher order.)	Title	Production company	Distributor	Worldwide gross	Ref.
1	Jawan	Red Chillies Entertainment	Pen Marudhar Entertainment; Yash Raj Films	₹1,148.32–1,159 crore	(Note: Jawan's reported worldwide grosses vary between ₹1,148.32 crore (Bollywood Hungama) – ₹1,159 crore (Pinkvilla))
2	Pathaan	Yash Raj Films		₹1,050.30–1,052.50 crore	(Note: Pathaan's reported worldwide grosses vary between ₹1,050.30 crore (Bollywood Hungama) – ₹1,052.50 crore (Pinkvilla))
3	Animal	T-Series Films; Bhadrakali Pictures; Cine1 Studios	AA Films; E4 Entertainment; Sri Venkateswara Creations; KVN Productions	₹905–917.82 crore	(Note: Animal's reported worldwide grosses vary between ₹905 crore (Pinkvilla) – ₹917.82 crore (Bollywood Hungama))
4	Gadar 2	Zee Studios; Anil Sharma Productions; MM Movies	Zee Studios	₹687–691.08 crore	(Note: Gadar 2's reported worldwide grosses vary between ₹687 crore (Pinkvilla) – ₹691.08 crore (Bollywood Hungama))
5	Dunki	Jio Studios; Red Chillies Entertainment; Rajkumar Hirani Films	Pen Marudhar Entertainment; Yash Raj Films	₹470.6 crore	
6	Tiger 3	Yash Raj Films		₹466.63 crore	
7	Rocky Aur Rani Kii Prem Kahaani	Viacom18 Studios; Dharma Productions	Viacom18 Studios	₹355.61 crore	
8	Adipurush (Note: The film was produced in both the Hindi and Telugu languages, according to the filmmakers.)	T-Series Films; Retrophiles	AA Films; UV Creations	₹350 crore	
9	The Kerala Story	Sunshine Pictures		₹303.97 crore	
10	Tu Jhoothi Main Makkaar	Luv Films; T-Series Films	Yash Raj Films	₹221.10 crore	

== January–March ==
Opening		Title	Director	Cast	Studio (production house)	Ref.
J A N	13	Kuttey	Aasmaan Bhardwaj	Arjun Kapoor; Tabu; Konkona Sen Sharma; Radhika Madan; Shardul Bhardwaj	T-Series Films, Luv Films, VB Films	
J A N	13	Lakadbaggha	Victor Mukherjee	Anshuman Jha; Riddhi Dogra; Milind Soman	First Ray Films	
J A N	20	Mission Majnu	Shantanu Bagchi	Sidharth Malhotra; Rashmika Mandanna; Kumud Mishra; Sharib Hashmi	RSVP Movies, Guilty By Association Media, Netflix	
J A N	20	Chhatriwali	Tejas Deoskar	Rakul Preet Singh; Sumeet Vyas; Satish Kaushik; Rajesh Tailang; Dolly Ahluwalia	RSVP Movies, ZEE5	
J A N	25	Pathaan	Siddharth Anand	Shah Rukh Khan; John Abraham; Deepika Padukone	Yash Raj Films	
J A N	26	Gandhi Godse – Ek Yudh	Rajkumar Santoshi	Deepak Antani; Chinmay Mandlekar	PVR Pictures, Santoshi Productions	
J A N	26	Operation Fryday	Vishram Sawant	Randeep Hooda	Tutri Ventures	
F E B	3	Almost Pyaar with DJ Mohabbat	Anurag Kashyap	Alaya F	Zee Studios, Good Bad Films	
F E B	3	Faraaz	Hansal Mehta	Zahan Kapoor; Aditya Rawal; Aamir Ali; Juhi Babbar	T-Series Films, Benaras Media Works, Mahana Films	
F E B	10	Shiv Shastri Balboa	Ajayan Venugopalan	Anupam Kher; Neena Gupta; Jugal Hansraj; Nargis Fakhri; Sharib Hashmi	UFI Motion Pictures, Anupam Kher Studio	
F E B	10	The Tenant (Note: The film was produced in both the Hindi and English languages, according to the filmmakers.)	Sushrut Jain	Shamita Shetty, Rudhraksh Jaiswal	Mad Coolie Productions	
F E B	16	Lost	Aniruddha Roy Chowdhury	Yami Gautam; Rahul Khanna; Neil Bhoopalam; Pia Bajpiee; Tushar Pandey	Zee Studios, Namah Pictures, Opus Communications, San Fernandes, ZEE5	
F E B	17	Shehzada	Rohit Dhawan	Kartik Aaryan; Kriti Sanon; Paresh Rawal; Manisha Koirala	T-Series Films, Allu Entertainment, Haarika & Hassine Creations, Ramara Films, Brat Films	
F E B	24	Selfiee	Raj Mehta	Akshay Kumar; Emraan Hashmi; Diana Penty; Nushrratt Bharuccha	Star Studios, Dharma Productions, Prithviraj Productions, Magic Frames, Cape of Good Films	
F E B	24	Rabia & Olivia	Shadab Khan	Sheeba Chadha; Nayab Khan; Helena Prinzen Klague	Synchron Entertainment, Disney+ Hotstar	
M A R	3	Gulmohar	Rahul V. Chittella	Manoj Bajpayee; Sharmila Tagore; Simran; Suraj Sharma	Star Studios, Chalkboard Entertainment, Autonomous Works, Disney+ Hotstar	
M A R	3	InCar	Harsh Warrdhan	Ritika Singh; Manish Jhanjholia; Sandeep Goyat; Sunil Soni; Gyan Prakash	Inbox Pictures	
M A R	8	Tu Jhoothi Main Makkaar	Luv Ranjan	Ranbir Kapoor; Shraddha Kapoor	T-Series Films, Luv Films	
M A R	17	Mrs. Chatterjee vs Norway	Ashima Chibber	Rani Mukerji	Zee Studios, Emmay Entertainment	
M A R	17	Zwigato	Nandita Das	Kapil Sharma; Shahana Goswami	Applause Entertainment, Nandita Das Initiatives	
M A R	17	Am I Next	Rahat Kazmi	Anushka Sen; Neelu Dogra; Pooja Dargan; Tariq Khan; Ahmer Haider	Rahat Kazmi Film Studios, Loop Pool Films, and Piku Art's	
M A R	24	Chor Nikal Ke Bhaga	Ajay Singh	Yami Gautam; Sharad Kelkar	Maddock Films, Netflix	
M A R	24	Bheed	Anubhav Sinha	Rajkummar Rao; Bhumi Pednekar; Dia Mirza; Ashutosh Rana; Pankaj Kapur	Reliance Entertainment, Benaras Media Works	
M A R	24	Operation Mayfair	Sudipto Sarkar	Jimmy Shergill; Hritiqa Chheber; Lee Nicholas Harris; Vedieka Dutt; Ankur Bhatia; Sneha Singh	T-Series Films, Vedant Films, Farm Cove	
M A R	24	Kanjoos Makhichoos	Vipul Mehta	Kunal Khemu; Shweta Tripathi; Piyush Mishra; Alka Amin; Raju Srivastav	Soham Rockstar Entertainment, Thundersky Entertainment, ZEE5	
M A R	30	Bholaa	Ajay Devgn	Ajay Devgn; Tabu	T-Series Films, Reliance Entertainment, Dream Warrior Pictures, Ajay Devgn FFilms	
M A R	31	Gaslight	Pawan Kripalani	Vikrant Massey; Sara Ali Khan; Chitrangda Singh	Tips Industries, 12th Street Entertainment, Disney+ Hotstar	

== April–June ==
Opening		Title	Director	Cast	Studio (production house)	Ref.
A P R	7	Gumraah	Vardhan Ketkar	Aditya Roy Kapur; Mrunal Thakur; Ronit Roy	T-Series Films, Cine1 Studios	
A P R	14	Mrs. Undercover	Anushree Mehta	Radhika Apte; Rajesh Sharma; Sumeet Vyas; Angana Roy; Amrita Chattopadhyay; Indrasish Roy	B4U Motion Pictures, Jaadugar Films, Knight Sky Movies, ZEE5	
A P R	14	Sir Madam Sarpanch	Praveen Morchhale	Seema Biswas; Ariana Sajnani; Hemant Deolekar; Jyoti Dubey; Shubhangini Srivas	Suncal Productions International	
A P R	14	Pinky Beauty Parlour	Akshay Singh	Akshay Singh; Sulagna Panigrahi; Khushboo Gupta; Vishwanath Chatterjee	Pen Studios, Cinépolis India, Cinecorn Entertainment	
A P R	21	Kisi Ka Bhai Kisi Ki Jaan	Farhad Samji	Salman Khan; Pooja Hegde; Venkatesh; Shehnaaz Gill; Jagapathi Babu	Zee Studios, Salman Khan Films	
A P R	28	Bad Boy	Rajkumar Santoshi	Namashi Chakraborty; Amrin Qureshi; Saswata Chatterjee; Darshan Jariwala; Johnny Lever	Inbox Pictures	
A P R	28	U-Turn	Arif Khan	Alaya F; Priyanshu Painyuli; Aashim Gulati; Manu Rishi; Rajesh Sharma	Balaji Telefilms, ZEE5	
M A Y	5	Mother Teresa & Me	Kamal Musale	Deepti Naval; Jacqueline Fitschi-Cornaz; Banita Sandhu	Curry Western Movies, Les Films du Lotus, Kavita Teresa Film	
M A Y	5	Afwaah	Sudhir Mishra	Nawazuddin Siddiqui; Bhumi Pednekar; Sumeet Vyas; Sharib Hashmi	Benaras Media Works	
M A Y	5	The Kerala Story	Sudipto Sen	Adah Sharma; Yogita Bihani; Sonia Balani; Siddhi Idnani	Sunshine Pictures	
M A Y	12	Chatrapathi	V. V. Vinayak	Bellamkonda Sreenivas; Nushrratt Bharuccha; Sahil Vaid	Pen Studios	
M A Y	12	Music School	Papa Rao Biyyala	Sharman Joshi; Prakash Raj; Shriya Saran; Suhasini Mulay; Mona Ambegaonkar; Gracy Goswami	Yamini Films, PVR Pictures	
M A Y	12	IB71	Sankalp Reddy	Vidyut Jammwal; Anupam Kher; Vishal Jethwa; Niharica Raizada	T-Series Films, Reliance Entertainment, Action Hero Films	
M A Y	19	Kathal	Yashowardhan Mishra	Sanya Malhotra; Anant V Joshi; Vijay Raaz; Rajpal Yadav; Brijendra Kala	Balaji Motion Pictures, Sikhya Entertainment, Netflix	
M A Y	19	Aazam	Shravan Tiwari	Jimmy Shergill; Abhimanyu Singh; Indraneil Sengupta; Raza Murad; Sayaji Shinde	BMX Motion Pictures, DXB Motion Film	
M A Y	19	8 A.M. Metro	Raj R	Gulshan Devaiah; Saiyami Kher	Studio 99, Platoon Distribution	
M A Y	19	Kacchey Limbu	Shubham Yogi	Radhika Madan; Rajat Barmecha; Ayush Mehra	Jio Studios, Mango People Media, JioCinema	
M A Y	23	Sirf Ek Bandaa Kaafi Hai	Apoorva Singh Karki	Manoj Bajpayee; Kaustav Sinha; Nikhil Pandey	Zee Studios, Bhanushali Studios Limited, ZEE5	
M A Y	26	Jogira Sara Ra Ra	Kushan Nandy	Nawazuddin Siddiqui; Neha Sharma; Sanjay Mishra; Mahaakshay Chakraborty	Touchwood Multimedia Creations	
M A Y	26	Coat	Akshay Ditti	Sanjay Mishra; Vivaan Shah; Pooja Pandey; Sonal Jha	Brandex Entertainment, Perfect Times Pictures, Black Panther Movies	
J U N	2	Zara Hatke Zara Bachke	Laxman Utekar	Vicky Kaushal; Sara Ali Khan	Jio Studios, Maddock Films	
J U N	2	Mumbaikar	Santosh Sivan	Vikrant Massey; Vijay Sethupathi; Tanya Maniktala; Ranvir Shorey; Sachin Khedekar	Jio Studios, HR Pictures, JioCinema	
J U N	9	Bloody Daddy	Ali Abbas Zafar	Rajeev Khandelwal; Amy Aela; Shahid Kapoor; Sanjay Kapoor; Diana Penty; Ronit Roy; Vivan Bhatena	Jio Studios, AAZ Films, Offside Entertainment, JioCinema	
J U N	16	Adipurush	Om Raut	Saif Ali Khan; Prabhas; Kriti Sanon; Sunny Singh	T-Series Films, Retrophiles	
J U N	16	I Love You	Nikhil Mahajan	Rakul Preet Singh; Akshay Oberoi; Pavail Gulati	Jio Studios, Athena ENM, JioCinema	
J U N	23	1920: Horrors of the Heart	Krishna Bhatt	Avika Gor; Rahul Dev; Barkha Bisht; Randheer Rai	Anand Pandit Motion Pictures, Houseful Motion Pictures	
J U N	23	Tiku Weds Sheru	Sai Kabir	Nawazuddin Siddiqui; Avneet Kaur	Manikarnika Films, Amazon Prime Video	
J U N	23	Aseq	Sarim Momin	Sonnalli Seygall; Vardhan Puri; Siddhanth Kapoor	Jio Studios, The Production Headquarters, Stone Circle Production, JioCinema	
J U N	29	Satyaprem Ki Katha	Sameer Vidwans	Kartik Aaryan; Kiara Advani; Gajraj Rao; Supriya Pathak	Namah Pictures, Nadiadwala Grandson Entertainment	
J U N	29	Lust Stories 2	R. Balki; Konkona Sen Sharma; Amit Ravindernath Sharma; Sujoy Ghosh	Amruta Subhash; Angad Bedi; Neena Gupta; Mrunal Thakur; Kumud Mishra; Tamannaah Bhatia; Kajol; Tillotama Shome; Vijay Varma	RSVP Movies, Flying Unicorn Entertainment, Hope Productions, The Vermillion World, Chrome Pictures, Netflix	
J U N	30	Sergeant	Prawaal Raman	Randeep Hooda; Adil Hussain; Sapna Pabbi; Arun Govil; Sonia Goswami	Jio Studios, JAR Pictures, JioCinema	

== July–September ==
Opening		Title	Director	Cast	Studio (production house)	Ref.
J U L	7	Neeyat	Anu Menon	Vidya Balan; Ram Kapoor; Rahul Bose; Shahana Goswami; Neeraj Kabi; Prajakta Koli; Shashank Arora; Amrita Puri	Abundatia Entertainment, Riddle Films, Amazon Studios	
J U L	7	Tarla	Piyush Gupta	Huma Qureshi; Sharib Hashmi; Veenah Naair	RSVP Movies, Earthsky Pictures, ZEE5	
J U L	7	Blind	Shome Makhija	Sonam Kapoor; Purab Kohli; Vinay Pathak; Lillete Dubey	Jio Studios, Kanai, AVMA, Kross Pictures, Lead Films, RV Motion Pictures, JioCinema	
J U L	7	72 Hoorain	Sanjay Puran Singh Chauhan	Saru Maini; Aamir Bashir; Rasheed Naz; Pawan Malhotra	SaarthiE Entertainment, Aliens Pictures	
J U L	14	Ishq-e-Nadaan	Avishek Ghosh	Lara Dutta; Neena Gupta; Kanwaljit Singh; Shriya Pilgaonkar; Mohit Raina; Suhail Nayyar	AVMA Media, Jio Studios, JioCinema	
J U L	21	Bawaal	Nitesh Tiwari	Varun Dhawan; Janhvi Kapoor	Earthsky Pictures, Nadiadwala Grandson Entertainment, Amazon Prime Video	
J U L	21	Trial Period	Aleya Sen	Genelia Deshmukh; Manav Kaul; Shakti Kapoor; Sheeba Chadha; Gajraj Rao	Jio Studios, Chrome Pictures, JioCinema	
J U L	21	Minus 31: The Nagpur Files	Pratik Moitro	Shivankit Singh Parihar; Raghubir Yadav; Rajesh Sharma; Rucha Inamdar; Santosh Juvekar; Jaya Bhattacharya	Orangepixel Studios PVT. LTD. Production, Dragon Water Films	
J U L	21	Ajmer 92	Pushpendra Singh	Karan Verma; Rajesh Sharma; Sayaji Shinde; Brijendra Kala; Zarina Wahab; Manoj Joshi; Alka Amin	Reliance Entertainment, U&K Entertainment, Summit Motion Pictures, Little Crew Pictures	
J U L	28	Rocky Aur Rani Kii Prem Kahaani	Karan Johar	Ranveer Singh; Alia Bhatt; Jaya Bachchan; Dharmendra; Shabana Azmi; Tota Roy Chowdhury; Churni Ganguly; Anjali Anand; Aamir Bashir; Kshitee Jog	Viacom18 Studios, Dharma Productions	
J U L	28	One Friday Night	Manish Gupta	Raveena Tandon; Milind Soman; Vidhi Chitalia	Jio Studios, JioCinema	
A U G
A U G	4	Panch Kriti	Sannjoy Bhargv	Brijendra Kala; Umesh Bajpai; Sagar Wahi; Purva Parag; Mahi Soni	Ubon Vision Pvt Ltd	
A U G	4	Lafzon Mein Pyaar	Raja Randeep Giri; Dhiraj Mishra	Anita Raj; Zarina Wahab; Vivek Anand Mishra; Kanchan Agnihotri; Mir Sarwar	Monarch Film	
A U G	11	Gadar 2	Anil Sharma	Sunny Deol; Ameesha Patel; Utkarsh Sharma	Zee Studios, Anil Sharma Productions, MM Moviez	
A U G	11	OMG 2	Amit Rai	Akshay Kumar; Yami Gautam; Pankaj Tripathi; Arun Govil	Viacom18 Studios, Cape of Good Films, Wakaoo Films	
A U G	18	Ghoomer	R. Balki	Abhishek Bachchan; Saiyami Kher; Shabana Azmi; Angad Bedi	Hope Productions, Saraswati Entertainment	
A U G	18	Non Stop Dhamaal	Irshad Khan	Annu Kapoor; Rajpal Yadav; Asrani; Manoj Joshi; Priyanshu Chatterjee; Veronica Vanij	Triyom Films	
A U G	25	Dream Girl 2	Raaj Shaandilyaa	Ayushmann Khurrana; Ananya Panday; Annu Kapoor; Paresh Rawal; Vijay Raaz; Manoj Joshi; Rajpal Yadav; Asrani; Seema Pahwa; Manjot Singh; Abhishek Banerjee	Balaji Motion Pictures	
A U G	25	Akelli	Pranay Meshram	Nushrratt Bharuccha; Nishant Dahiya; Tsahi Halevi; Amir Boutrous	Dashami Studioz	
A U G	25	Goldfish	Pushan Kripalani	Kalki Koechlin; Deepti Naval; Rajit Kapoor; Gordon Warnecke	Splendid Films	
S E P	1	Friday Night Plan	Vatsal Neelakantan	Juhi Chawla; Babil Khan; Amrith Jayan; Medha Rana; Aadhya Anand; Ninad Kamat	Excel Entertainment, Netflix	
S E P	1	Mystery of the Tattoo	Kalaiarasi Sathappan; Ganesh Mahadevan	Rohit Raaj; Daisy Shah; Ameesha Patel; Arjun Rampal	Tattoo Film Productions	
S E P	1	Love All	Sudhanshu Sharma	Kay Kay Menon; Swastika Mukherjee; Shriswara; Robin Das; Sumit Arora	L6F Studios, Lakshmi Ganpathy Film Studios, Anand Pandit Motion Pictures, Filmart Production	
S E P	7	Jawan	Atlee	Shah Rukh Khan; Nayanthara; Vijay Sethupathi; Priyamani; Sanya Malhotra; Deepika Padukone	Red Chillies Entertainment	
S E P	7	Haddi	Akshat Ajay Sharma	Nawazuddin Siddiqui; Anurag Kashyap; Ila Arun	Zee Studios, Anandita Studios, ZEE5	
S E P	21	Jaane Jaan	Sujoy Ghosh	Kareena Kapoor Khan; Jaideep Ahlawat; Vijay Varma	Balaji Motion Pictures, 12th Street Entertainment, Northern Lights Films, Kross Pictures, Boundscript, Miracle Pictures, Netflix	
S E P	22	The Great Indian Family	Vijay Krishna Acharya	Vicky Kaushal; Manushi Chhillar	Yash Raj Films	
S E P	22	Sukhee	Sonal Joshi	Shilpa Shetty; Amit Sadh; Kusha Kapila; Dilnaz Irani	T-Series Films, Abundatia Entertainment	
S E P	22	The Purvanchal Files	Swarup Ghosh	Siddharth Pandey; Shivani Thakur; Zarina Wahab; Mukesh Tiwari; Govind Namdeo	Reliance Entertainment, Rudraksha Telefilms	
S E P	22	The Rise Of Sudarshan Chakra	Anil Kulchainiya	Yashpal Sharma; Preeti Jhangiani; Milind Gunaji; Rakesh Bedi	Shiromani Creations, Nandi Picture	
S E P	28	The Vaccine War	Vivek Agnihotri	Anupam Kher; Nana Patekar; Raima Sen; Pallavi Joshi	Abhishek Agarwal Arts, I Am Buddha	
S E P	28	Fukrey 3	Mrighdeep Singh	Pankaj Tripathi; Pulkit Samrat; Varun Sharma; Richa Chadha; Manjot Singh	Reliance Entertainment, Excel Entertainment	
S E P	28	Pyaar Hai Toh Hai	Pradeep R.K. Chaudhary	Karan Hariharan; Paanie Kashyap	Shreetara Cinevision	
S E P	29	Dvand: The Internal Conflict	Ishtiyak Khan	Ishtiyak Khan; Sanjay Mishra; Vikram Kochhar; Ipshita Chakraborty Singh; Faiz Mohammed Khan	Jumping Tomato Studios, Vsquare Films	
S E P	29	Tumse Na Ho Payega	Abhishek Sinha	Ishwak Singh; Mahima Makwana; Gaurav Pandey; Amala Akkineni; Gurpreet Saini	Star Studios, RSVP Movies, Roy Kapur Films, Earthsky Pictures, Disney+Hotstar	

== October–December ==
Opening		Title	Director	Cast	Studio (production house)	Ref.
O C T	5	Dono	Avnish S. Barjatya	Rajveer Deol; Paloma	Jio Studios, Rajshri Productions	
O C T	5	Khufiya	Vishal Bharadwaj	Tabu; Ali Fazal; Wamiqa Gabbi; Ashish Vidyarthi; Azmeri Haque Badhon; Alexx O'Nell	VB Pictures, Netflix	
O C T	6	Mission Raniganj	Tinu Suresh Desai	Akshay Kumar; Parineeti Chopra	Pooja Entertainment, Ajay Kapoor Productions	
O C T	6	Thank You for Coming	Karan Boolani	Bhumi Pednekar; Shehnaaz Gill; Dolly Singh; Kusha Kapila; Shibani Bedi; Karan Kundrra; Tejaswi Dev Chaudhary; Saloni Daini	Balaji Motion Pictures, Anil Kapoor Films & Communication Network	
O C T	6	Yaatris	Harish Vyas	Raghubir Yadav; Seema Pahwa; Anuraag Malhan; Jamie Lever; Chahatt Khanna	Akion Entertainment	
O C T	13	Dhak Dhak	Tarun Dudeja	Ratna Pathak Shah; Dia Mirza; Fatima Sana Shaikh; Sanjana Sanghi	Viacom18 Studios, Outsiders Films, BLM Pictures	
O C T	13	Guthlee Ladoo	Ishrat R. Khan	Sanjay Mishra; Heet Sharma; Subrat Dutta; Kalyanee Mulay	UV Films, Panorama Studios	
O C T	13	Darran Chhoo	Bharat Ratan	Karan Patel; Ankita Bhargava Patel; Ashutosh Rana; Manoj Joshi; Saanand Verma; Smiriti Kalra	Mark Movies	
O C T	13	Bhagwan Bharose	Shiladitya Bora	Vinay Pathak; Masumeh Makhija; Manurishi Chaddha; Shrikant Verma; Satendra Soni; Sparsh Suman	Platoon One Films, Rhythm Boyz Entertainment	
O C T	20	Ganapath	Vikas Bahl	Amitabh Bachchan; Tiger Shroff; Kriti Sanon; Elli AvrRam	Pooja Entertainment, Good Co.	
O C T	20	Yaariyan 2	Radhika Rao; Vinay Sapru	Divya Khosla Kumar; Yash Daasguptaa; Pearl V Puri; Meezaan Jafri; Anaswara Rajan; Priya Prakash Varrier; Warina Hussain	T-Series Films, BLM Pictures	
O C T	27	12th Fail	Vidhu Vinod Chopra	Vikrant Massey; Medha Shankar; Priyanshu Chatterjee; Harish Khanna	Zee Studios, Vinod Chopra Films	
O C T	27	Tejas	Sarvesh Mewara	Kangana Ranaut	RSVP Movies	
O C T	27	Sajini Shinde Ka Viral Video	Mikhil Musale	Nimrat Kaur; Radhika Madan; Bhagyashree; Sumeet Vyas; Subodh Bhave; Chinmay Mandlekar	Maddock Films	
O C T	27	Mujib: The Making of a Nation	Shyam Benegal	Arifin Shuvoo; Nusrat Imrose Tisha; Nusraat Faria; Fazlur Rahman Babu; Shahidul Alam Sachchu; Deepak Antani	National Film Development Corporation of India, Bangladesh Film Development Corporation	
O C T	27	Pyar Ki Policy	Sudhish Kumar Sharma	Manoj Bakshi; Girish Thapar; Vikas Giri; Jolly Bhatia; Megha Saxsena; Sunny Prajapati	K P S Film, Apaan Film	
O C T	27	Mandali	Rakesh Chaturvedi Om	Abhishek Duhan; Rajniesh Duggall; Brijendra Kala; Vineet Kumar; Aanchal Munjal	Reltic Pictures	
N O V	3	Aankh Micholi	Umesh Shukla	Abhimanyu Dassani; Mrunal Thakur; Paresh Rawal; Sharman Joshi; Divya Dutta; Abhishek Banerjee; Darshan Jariwala; Vijay Raaz	Sony Pictures India, Merry Go Round Studios	
N O V	3	The Lady Killer	Ajay Bahl	Arjun Kapoor; Bhumi Pednekar	SCIPL, Karma Media & Entertainment, Jussawala Productions, Polaroid Media, Movies N More	
N O V	3	Lakeerein	Durgesh Pathak	Ashutosh Rana; Bidita Bag; Tia Bajpai; Rajesh Jais	Image & Creation, BTC Multimedia Productions, Blackpearl Movies	
N O V	3	Hukus Bukus	Vinay Bharadwaj; Saumitra Singh	Darsheel Safary; Arun Govil; Sajjad Delafrooz; Gautam Vij; Mir Sarwar	Shining Sun Studios	
N O V	3	UT69	Shahnawaz Ali	Raj Kundra; Kumar Saurabh	SVS Studios, The Bigger Picture Films	
N O V	3	Three of Us	Avinash Arun Dhaware	Shefali Shah; Jaideep Ahlawat; Swanand Kirkire	Allu Entertainment, Matchbox Shots	
N O V	3	Shastry Viruddh Shastry	Shiboprosad Mukherjee; Nandita Roy	Paresh Rawal; Shiv Panditt; Neena Kulkarni; Mimi Chakraborty	Viacom18 Studios, Windows Production	
N O V	10	Pippa	Raja Krishna Menon	Ishaan Khatter; Mrunal Thakur; Priyanshu Painyuli; Soni Razdan	RSVP Movies, Roy Kapur Films, Amazon Prime Video	
N O V	12	Tiger 3	Maneesh Sharma	Salman Khan; Katrina Kaif; Emraan Hashmi	Yash Raj Films	
N O V	15	Apurva	Nikhil Nagesh Bhat	Tara Sutaria; Abhishek Banerjee; Rajpal Yadav; Dhairya Karwa	Star Studios, Cine1 Studios, Disney+ Hotstar	
N O V	17	Khichdi 2: Mission Paanthukistan	Aatish Kapadia	Supriya Pathak; Rajeev Mehta; Anang Desai; Vandana Pathak; Kirti Kulhari; Jamnadas Majethia	Hats Off Productions	
N O V	18	Sab Moh Maaya Hai	Abhinav Pareek	Sharman Joshi; Annu Kapoor	Bhanushali Studios, Veda Film Factory	
N O V	24	Farrey	Soumendra Padhi	Alizeh Agnihotri; Zeyn Shaw; Sahil Mehta; Prasanna Bisht; Ronit Roy; Juhi Babbar	Salman Khan Films, Reel Life Production, Mythri Movie Makers, Athena ENM	
N O V	24	Starfish	Akhilesh Jaiswal	Khushalii Kumar; Milind Soman; Ehan Bhat; Tusharr Khanna	T-Series Films, Almighty Motion Picture	
N O V	24	Do Ajnabee	Sanjeev Kumar Rajput	Aarya Babbar; Ankit Bathla; Anu Mitra; Aman Yatan Verma	Blockbuster Films, PK Entertainment	
D E C	1	Animal	Sandeep Reddy Vanga	Ranbir Kapoor; Rashmika Mandanna; Anil Kapoor; Bobby Deol; Tripti Dimri	T-Series Films, Bhadrakali Pictures Productions, Cine1 Studios	
D E C	1	Sam Bahadur	Meghna Gulzar	Vicky Kaushal; Sanya Malhotra; Fatima Sana Shaikh	RSVP Movies	
D E C	7	The Archies	Zoya Akhtar	Mihir Ahuja; Suhana Khan; Khushi Kapoor; Agastya Nanda; Vedang Raina; Aditi Saigal; Yuvraj Menda	Archie Comics, Graphic India, Tiger Baby Films, Netflix	
D E C	8	Joram	Devashish Makhija	Manoj Bajpayee; Mohammed Zeeshan Ayyub; Smita Tambe	Zee Studios, Makhija Films	
D E C	8	Kadak Singh	Aniruddha Roy Chowdhury	Pankaj Tripathi; Parvathy Thiruvothu; Jaya Ahsan; Sanjana Sanghi; Dilip Shankar; Paresh Pahuja; Varun Buddhadev	WIZ Films, KVN Productions, HT Content Studio, First Step Films, Opus Communications, ZEE5	
D E C	8	Mast Mein Rehne Ka	Vijay Maurya	Jackie Shroff; Neena Gupta; Abhishek Chauhan; Monika Panwar; Rakhi Sawant; Faisal Malik	Amazon MGM Studios, Made in Maurya, Amazon Prime Video	
D E C	15	Kaisi Ye Dor	Ratna Neelam Pandey; Sandeep S. Choudhary	Nikhil Pandey; Jashn Agnihotri; Ratna Neelam Pandey; Brijendra Kala	Ojas Entertainments	
D E C	21	Dunki	Rajkumar Hirani	Shah Rukh Khan; Taapsee Pannu; Vicky Kaushal; Boman Irani; Vikram Kochhar; Anil Grover	Jio Studios, Red Chillies Entertainment, Rajkumar Hirani Films	
D E C	22	Dry Day	Saurabh Shukla	Jitendra Kumar; Annu Kapoor; Shriya Pilgaonkar	Amazon MGM Studios, Emmay Entertainment, Amazon Prime Video	
D E C	26	Kho Gaye Hum Kahan	Arjun Varain Singh	Adarsh Gourav; Siddhant Chaturvedi; Ananya Panday	Reliance Entertainment, Excel Entertainment, Tiger Baby Films, Netflix	
D E C	29	Safed	Sandeep Singh	Abhay Verma; Meera Chopra	Legend Studios, Anand Pandit Motion Pictures, ZEE5	

== See also ==
- List of Hindi films
- List of Hindi films of 2022
- List of Hindi films of 2024
