= 69th Filmfare Awards =

2024 awards for Hindi cinema

- Presented on: 27–28 January 2024
- Site: GIFT City, Gujarat
- Hosted by: Karan Johar; Ayushmann Khurrana; Maniesh Paul
- Organized by: The Times Group
- Official website: Filmfare Awards 2024

Highlights
- Best Film: 12th Fail
- Best Director: Vidhu Vinod Chopra for 12th Fail
- Best Actor: Ranbir Kapoor for Animal
- Best Actress: Alia Bhatt for Rocky Aur Rani Kii Prem Kahaani
- Critics Award for Best Film: Joram
- Most awards: 12th Fail & Animal (5)
- Most nominations: Rocky Aur Rani Kii Prem Kahaani (20)

Television coverage
- Network: Zee TV

The 69th Filmfare Awards is a ceremony, presented by The Times Group, which honored the best Indian Hindi-language films of 2023.

Rocky Aur Rani Kii Prem Kahaani led the ceremony with 20 nominations, followed by Animal with 19 nominations, Pathaan with 16 nominations, Jawan with 15 nominations, and 12th Fail with 12 nominations.

12th Fail and Animal won 5 awards each, thus becoming the most-awarded films at the ceremony, with the former winning Best Film, Best Director (for Vidhu Vinod Chopra) and Best Actor (Critics) (for Vikrant Massey), and the latter winning Best Actor (for Ranbir Kapoor).

Shah Rukh Khan received dual nominations for Best Actor for his performances in Jawan and Dunki, but lost to Ranbir Kapoor who won the award for Animal.

== Ceremony ==
The ceremony held at GIFT City Gandhinagar, Gujarat, honored the films released in 2023. At a press conference, the editor of Filmfare magazine, Jitesh Pillai revealed Hyundai and Gujarat Tourism as the title sponsor. Karan Johar, Ayushmann Khurana and Manish Paul were announced as the co-hosts. The 69th Filmfare Awards were held on 27 & 28 January 2024. The winners in the technical categories were announced on 27 January, while the main ceremony took place on 28 January 2024.

== Winners and nominees ==
The nominations were announced by Filmfare on 25 May 2025. The winners were announced in a ceremony held on 1 June 2025.

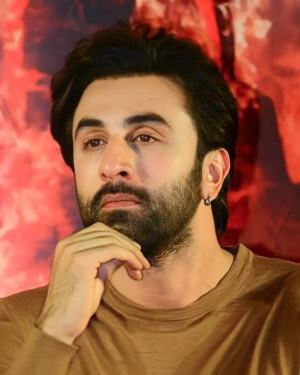
Ranbir Kapoor, Best Actor

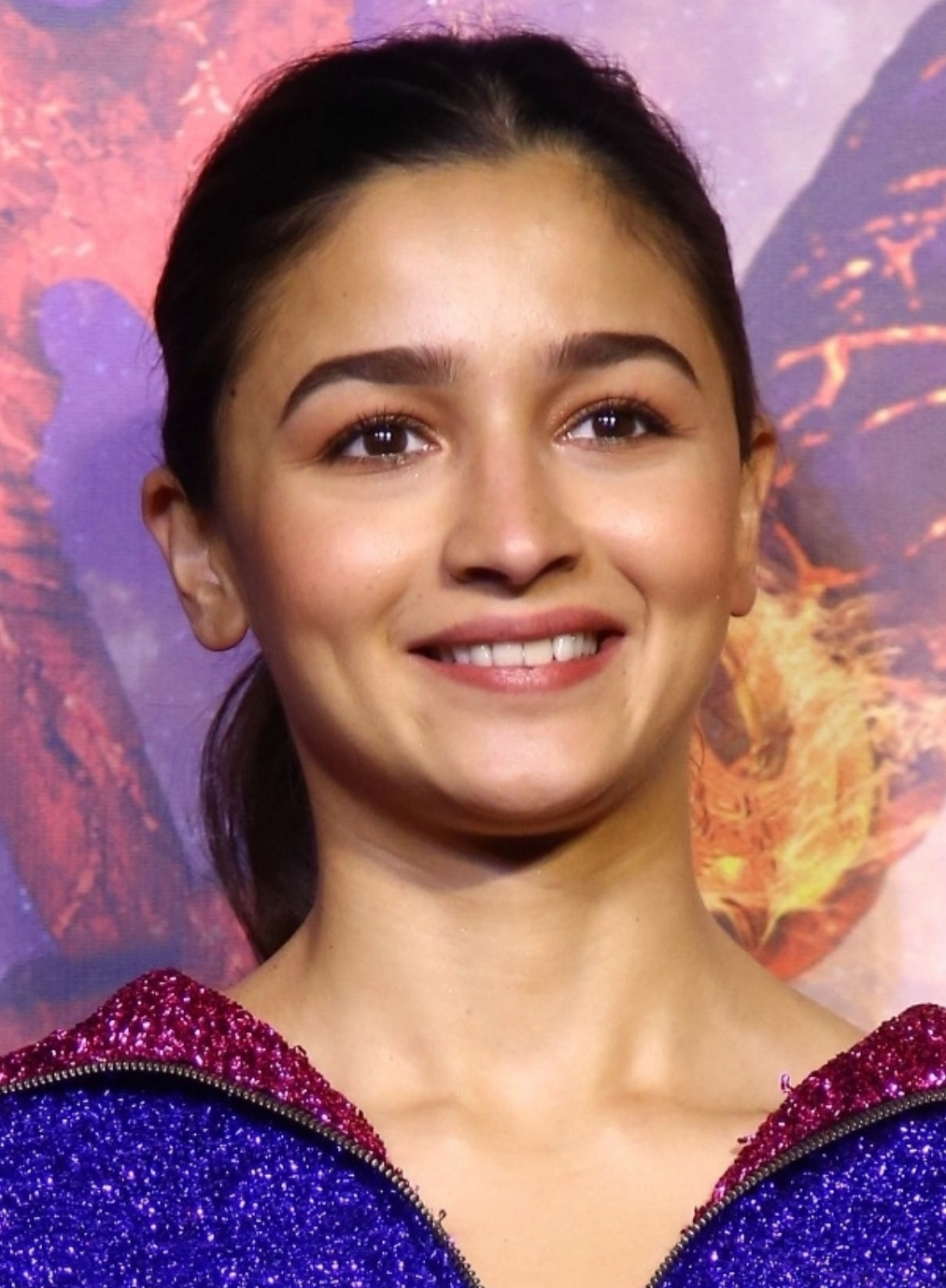
Alia Bhatt, Best Actress

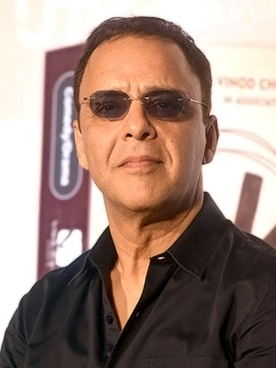
Vidhu Vinod Chopra, Best Director

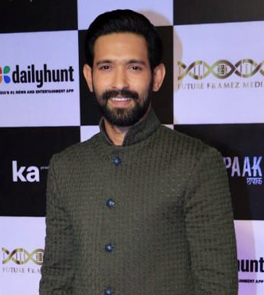
Vikrant Massey, Best Actor Critics

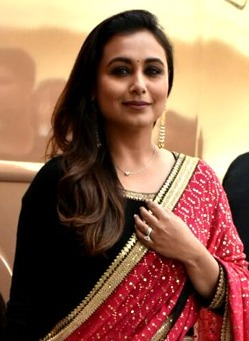
Rani Mukerji, Best Actress Critics co-winner

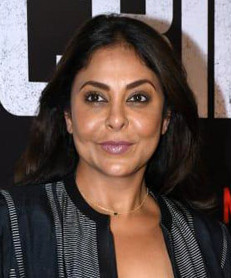
Shefali Shah, Best Actress Critics co-winner

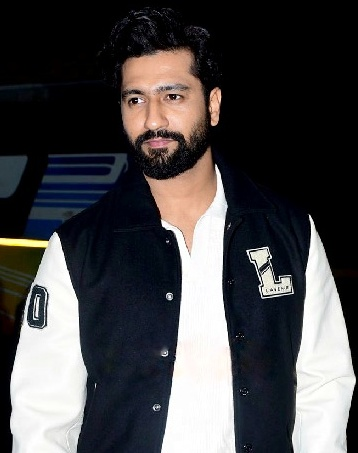
Vicky Kaushal, Best Supporting Actor

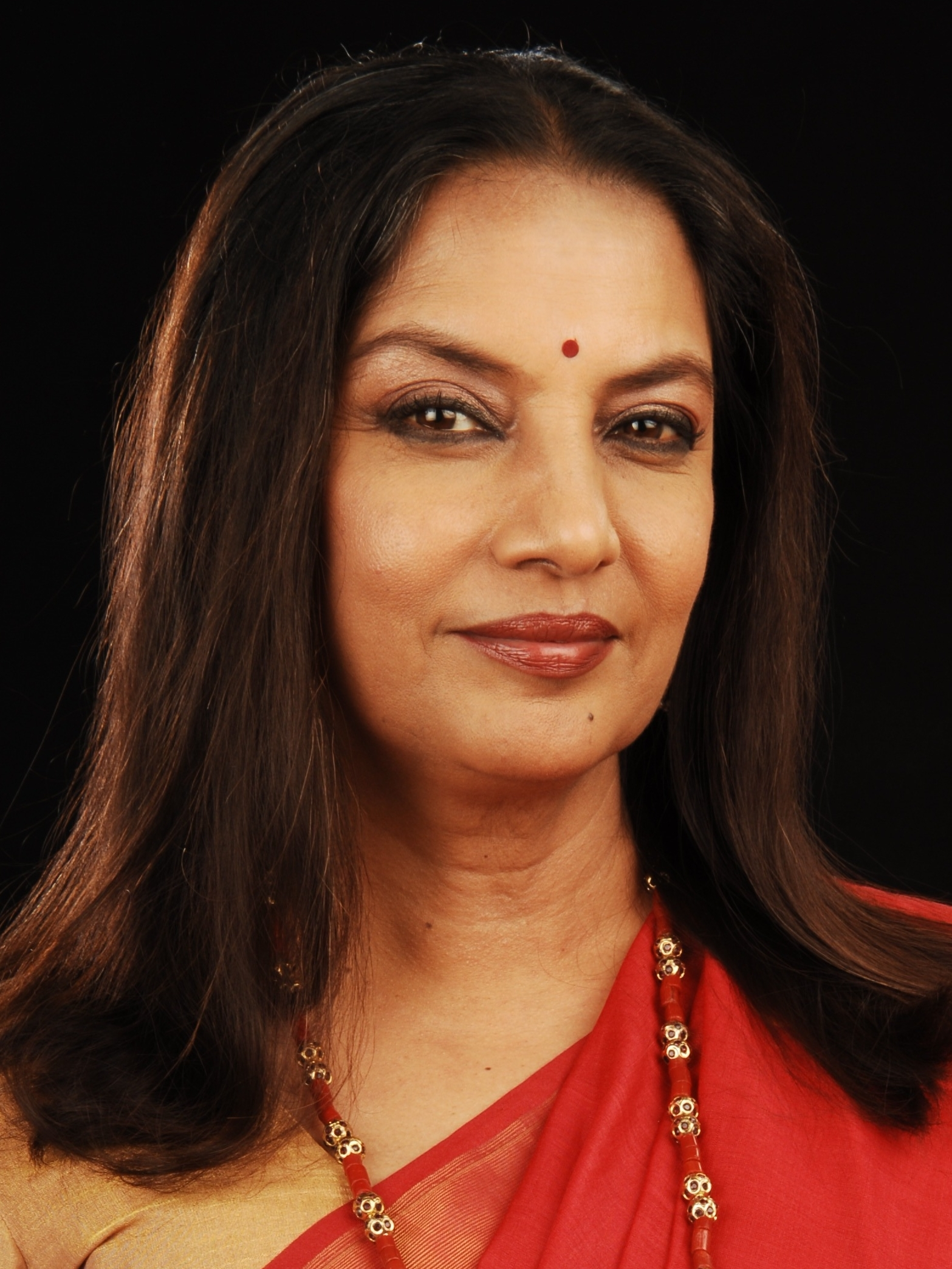
Shabana Azmi, Best Supporting Actress

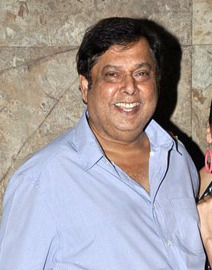
David Dhawan, Lifetime Achievement Awardee

=== Popular awards ===
| Best Film | | Best Director |
|---|---|---|
| 12th Fail – Vinod Chopra Films, Zee Studios; Animal – T-Series Films, Cine1 Studios, Bhadrakali Pictures; Jawan – Red Chillies Entertainment; OMG 2 – Cape of Good Films, Viacom18 Studios, Wakaoo Films; Pathaan – Yash Raj Films; Rocky Aur Rani Kii Prem Kahaani – Dharma Productions, Viacom18 Studios | | Vidhu Vinod Chopra – 12th Fail; Amit Rai – OMG 2; Atlee – Jawan; Karan Johar – Rocky Aur Rani Kii Prem Kahaani; Sandeep Reddy Vanga – Animal; Siddharth Anand – Pathaan |
| Best Actor | | Best Actress |
| Ranbir Kapoor – Animal as Ranvijay Singh and Aziz Haque; Ranveer Singh – Rocky Aur Rani Kii Prem Kahaani as Rocky Randhawa; Shah Rukh Khan – Dunki as Hardayal "Hardy" Singh Dhillon; Shah Rukh Khan – Jawan as Vikram Rathore and Azad; Sunny Deol – Gadar 2 as Tara Singh; Vicky Kaushal – Sam Bahadur as Sam Manekshaw | | Alia Bhatt – Rocky Aur Rani Kii Prem Kahaani as Rani Chatterjee; Bhumi Pednekar – Thank You for Coming as Kanika Kapoor; Deepika Padukone – Pathaan as Dr. Rubina "Rubai" Mohsin, Kiara Advani – Satyaprem Ki Katha as Katha Kapadia; Rani Mukerji – Mrs. Chatterjee vs Norway as Debika Chatterjee; Taapsee Pannu – Dunki as Manu Randhawa |
| Best Supporting Actor | | Best Supporting Actress |
| Vicky Kaushal – Dunki as Sukhi; Akshay Kumar - OMG 2 as Shiva; Aditya Rawal – Faraaz as Nibras; Anil Kapoor – Animal as Balbir Singh and Kailash Petkar; Bobby Deol – Animal as Abrar Haque; Emraan Hashmi – Tiger 3 as Aatish Rehman; Tota Roy Chowdhury – Rocky Aur Rani Kii Prem Kahaani as Chandon Chatterjee | | Shabana Azmi – Rocky Aur Rani Kii Prem Kahaani as Jamini Chatterjee; Jaya Bachchan – Rocky Aur Rani Kii Prem Kahaani as Dhanlakshmi Randhawa; Ratna Pathak Shah – Dhak Dhak as Manpreet Kaur Sethi "Mahi"; Shabana Azmi – Ghoomer as Anina's grandmother; Tripti Dimri – Animal as Zoya; Yami Gautam – OMG 2 as Kamini Maheshwari |
Debut Awards
| Best Male Debut | Best Female Debut | Best Debut Director |
| Aditya Rawal – Faraaz as Nibras | Alizeh Agnihotri – Farrey as Niyati | Tarun Dudeja – Dhak Dhak |
Writing Awards
| Best Story | Best Screenplay | Best Dialogue |
| Amit Rai – OMG 2; Devashish Makhija – Joram; Anubhav Sinha – Bheed; Atlee – Jawan; Ishita Moitra, Shashank Khaitan, Sumit Roy – Rocky Aur Rani Kii Prem Kahaani; Parijat Joshi, Tarun Dudeja – Dhak Dhak; Karan Shrikant Sharma – Satyaprem Ki Katha; Siddharth Anand – Pathaan | Vidhu Vinod Chopra – 12th Fail; Amit Rai – OMG 2; Ishita Moitra, Shashank Khaitan, Sumit Roy – Rocky Aur Rani Kii Prem Kahaani; Sandeep Reddy Vanga, Pranay Reddy Vanga, Suresh Bandaru – Animal; Shridhar Raghavan – Pathaan; Avinash Arun, Omkar Achyut Barve, Arpita Chatterjee – Three of Us | Ishita Moitra – Rocky Aur Rani Kii Prem Kahaani; Abbas Tyrewala – Pathaan; Amit Rai – OMG 2; Sumit Arora – Jawan; Varun Grover and Shoaib Zulfi Nazeer – Three of Us; Vidhu Vinod Chopra – 12th Fail |
Music Awards
| Best Music Director | | Best Lyricist |
| Pritam, Vishal Mishra, Manan Bhardwaj, Harshavardhan Rameshwar, Shreyas Puranik, Ashim Kemson, Bhupinder Babbal, Jaani – Animal; Anirudh Ravichander – Jawan; Pritam – Dunki; Pritam – Rocky Aur Rani Kii Prem Kahaani; Pritam – Tu Jhoothi Main Makkaar; Sachin–Jigar – Zara Hatke Zara Bachke; Vishal–Shekhar – Pathaan | | Amitabh Bhattacharya – "Tere Vaaste" – Zara Hatke Zara Bachke; Amitabh Bhattacharya – "Tum Kya Mile" – Rocky Aur Rani Kii Prem Kahaani; Gulzar – "Itni Si Baat" – Sam Bahadur; Javed Akhtar – "Nikle The Kabhi Hum Ghar Se" – Dunki; Siddharth–Garima – "Satranga" – Animal; Swanand Kirkire and IP Singh – "Lutt Putt Gaya" – Dunki |
| Best Playback Singer – Male | | Best Playback Singer – Female |
| Bhupinder Babbal – "Arjan Vailly" – Animal; Arijit Singh – "Lutt Putt Gaya" – Dunki; Arijit Singh – "Satranga" – Animal; Shahid Mallya – "Kudmayi" – Rocky Aur Rani Kii Prem Kahaani; Sonu Nigam – "Nikle The Kabhi Hum Ghar Se" – Dunki; Varun Jain, Sachin-Jigar, Shadaab Faridi, Altamash Faridi – "Tere Vaaste" – Zara Hatke Zara Bachke | | Shilpa Rao – "Besharam Rang" – Pathaan; Deepthi Suresh – "Aararaari Raaro" – Jawan; Jonita Gandhi – "Hey Fikar" – 8 A.M. Metro; Shilpa Rao – "Chaleya" – Jawan; Shreya Ghoshal – "Tum Kya Mile" – Rocky Aur Rani Kii Prem Kahaani; Shreya Ghoshal – "Ve Kamleya" – Rocky Aur Rani Kii Prem Kahaani |

=== Critics' awards ===
Best Film
Joram – Devashish Makhija; 12th Fail – Vidhu Vinod Chopra; Bheed – Anubhav Sinha; Faraaz – Hansal Mehta; Sam Bahadur – Meghna Gulzar; Three of Us – Avinash Arun; Zwigato – Nandita Das
| Best Actor | Best Actress |
| Vikrant Massey – 12th Fail as Manoj Kumar Sharma; Abhishek Bachchan – Ghoomer as Padam “Paddy” Singh Sodhi; Jaideep Ahlawat – Three of Us as Pradeep Kamat; Manoj Bajpayee – Joram as Dasru / Bala; Pankaj Tripathi – OMG 2 as Kanti Sharan Mudgal; Rajkummar Rao – Bheed as Surya Kumar Singh Tikas; Vicky Kaushal – Sam Bahadur as Sam Manekshaw | Rani Mukerji – Mrs. Chatterjee vs Norway as Debika Chatterjee; Shefali Shah – Three of Us as Shailaja Desai; Deepti Naval – Goldfish as Sadhana Tripathi; Fatima Sana Shaikh – Dhak Dhak as Shashi Kumar Yadav "Sky"; Saiyami Kher – Ghoomer as Anina “Ani” Dixit; Shahana Goswami – Zwigato as Pratima Mahto |

=== Special awards ===
| Filmfare Lifetime Achievement Award | Filmfare R. D. Burman Award |
|---|---|
| David Dhawan | Shreyas Puranik for "Satranga" from Animal |

=== Technical awards ===
Nominations for the technical awards were announced on 15 January 2024. The winners in these categories were announced on 27 January.

| Best Editing | Best Production Design | Best Choreography |
|---|---|---|
| Juskunwar Kohil and Vidhu Vinod Chopra – 12th Fail; Aarif Shaikh – Pathaan; Atanu Mukherjee – Afwaah; Ruben – Jawan; Sandeep Reddy Vanga – Animal; Suvir Nath – OMG 2 | Subrata Chakraborty and Amit Ray – Sam Bahadur; Amrita Mahal Nakai – Rocky Aur Rani Kii Prem Kahaani; Nikhil Kovale – OMG 2; Prashant Bidkar – 12th Fail; Rita Ghosh – Zwigato; Suresh Selvarajan – Animal; T. Muthuraj – Jawan | Ganesh Acharya – "What Jhumka?" – Rocky Aur Rani Kii Prem Kahaani; Bosco–Caesar – "Jhoome Jo Pathaan" – Pathaan; Ganesh Acharya – "Lutt Putt Gaya" – Dunki; Ganesh Acharya – "Tere Vaaste Falak" – Zara Hatke Zara Bachke; Shobi Paulraj – "Zinda Banda" – Jawan; Vaibhavi Merchant – "Dhindora Baaje" – Rocky Aur Rani Kii Prem Kahaani |
| Best Cinematography | Best Sound Design | Best Background Score |
| Avinash Arun – Three of Us; Amit Roy – Animal; G. K. Vishnu – Jawan; Manush Nandan – Rocky Aur Rani Kii Prem Kahaani; Pratham Mehta – Faraaz; Rangarajan Ramabadran – 12th Fail; Satchith Paulose – Pathaan | Kunal Sharma – Sam Bahadur; Sync Cinema – Animal; Anita Kushwaha – Bheed; Manas Choudhury and Ganesh Gangadharan – Pathaan; Manav Shrotriya – 12th Fail; Mandar Kulkarni – Faraaz; Vinit D'Souza – Three of Us | Harshavardhan Rameshwar – Animal; Alokananda Dasgupta – Three of Us; Karel Antonin – Afwaah; Ketan Sodha – Sam Bahadur; Sanchit Balhara and Ankit Balhara – Pathaan; Shantanu Moitra – 12th Fail; Tapas Relia – Goldfish |
| Best Costume Design | Best Action | Best Special Effects |
| Sachin Lovelekar, Divvya Gambhir, and Nidhhi Gambhir – Sam Bahadur; Malvika Bajaj – 12th Fail; Manish Malhotra and Eka Lakhani – Rocky Aur Rani Kii Prem Kahaani; Shaleena Nathani, Kavitha J, Anirudh Singh and Dipika Lal – Jawan; Shaleena Nathani, Mamta Anand and Niharika Jolly – Pathaan; Sheetal Sharma – Animal | Spiro Razatos, Anal Arasu, Craig Macrae, Yannick Ben, Kecha Khamphakdee, and Sunil Rodrigues – Jawan; Casey O'Neill, Craig Macrae and Sunil Rodrigues – Pathaan; Franz Spilhaus, Oh Sea Young and Sunil Rodrigues – Tiger 3; Parvez Shaikh – Sam Bahadur; Ravi Varma, Shaam Kaushal, Abbas Ali Moghul and Tinu Verma – Gadar 2; Supreme Sundar – Animal; Tim Man and Vikram Dahiya – Ganapath | Red Chillies VFX – Jawan; Do It Creative LTD. NY VFXWala, Visual Birds, Red Chillies VFX, Famous Studios – Animal; Prisca, Pixel Studios. – Gadar 2; YFX – Pathaan |

== Superlatives ==
Multiple nominations
| Nominations | Film |
|---|---|
| 20 | Rocky Aur Rani Kii Prem Kahaani |
| 19 | Animal |
| 16 | Pathaan |
| 15 | Jawan |
| 12 | 12th Fail |
| 9 | Dunki |
| 9 | OMG 2 |
| 9 | Sam Bahadur |
| 8 | Three of Us |
| 4 | Bheed |
| 4 | Faraaz |
| 4 | Zara Hatke Zara Bachke |
| 3 | Dhak Dhak |
| 3 | Gadar 2 |
| 3 | Ghoomer |
| 3 | Joram |
| 3 | Zwigato |
| 2 | Afwaah |
| 2 | Goldfish |
| 2 | Mrs. Chatterjee vs Norway |
| 2 | Satyaprem Ki Katha |
| 2 | Tiger 3 |

Multiple wins
| Awards | Film |
|---|---|
| 5 | 12th Fail |
| 5 | Animal |
| 4 | Rocky Aur Rani Kii Prem Kahaani |
| 3 | Sam Bahadur |
| 2 | Jawan |
| 2 | Three of Us |

== See also ==
- Filmfare Awards
- List of Hindi films of 2023
