= Tu Jhoothi Main Makkaar (soundtrack) =

- Soundtrack album cover

Soundtrack album by Pritam
- Released: 11 March 2023
- Recorded: 2022–2023
- Genre: Feature film soundtrack
- Length: 25:00
- Language: Hindi
- Label: T-Series

Pritam chronology
Shehzada (2023)	Tu Jhoothi Main Makkaar (2023)	Rocky Aur Rani Kii Prem Kahaani (2023)
External audio
- Audio Jukebox on YouTube

Tu Jhoothi Main Makkaar is the soundtrack to the 2023 film of the same name directed and co-produced by Luv Ranjan, through Luv Films and T-Series Films, starring Ranbir Kapoor and Shraddha Kapoor. The six-song soundtrack features music composed by Pritam and lyrics written by Amitabh Bhattacharya, was released on 11 March 2023.

== Background ==
The film's music is composed by Pritam in his eighth collaboration with Ranbir and first with Ranjan. (Note: Pritam had previously scored Ranbir's Ajab Prem Ki Ghazab Kahani (2009), Raajneeti (2010), Barfi! (2012), Yeh Jawaani Hai Deewani (2013), Ae Dil Hai Mushkil (2016), Jagga Jasoos (2017) and Brahmāstra: Part One – Shiva (2022)) Pritam's inclusion was confirmed on 26 June 2022. Amitabh Bhattacharya was confirmed as the songwriter.

== Release ==
The soundtrack to the film featured six songs, with four of them were released as singles. The first single titled "Tere Pyaar Mein" sung by Arijit Singh and Nikhita Gandhi, was released on 30 January 2023. The second single titled "Pyaar Hota Kayi Baar Hai", performed by Arijit, was released on 9 February. The third single titled "Show Me The Thumka", performed by Shaswat Singh and Sunidhi Chauhan was released on 19 February. The fourth single titled "O Bedardeya" performed by Arijit was released on 1 March 2023. Post-the film's release, the fifth song "Jaadui" was released on 10 March 2023, followed by the sixth song "Maine Pi Rakhi Hai" on 17 March.

== Track listing ==
No.	Title	Singer(s)	Length
1.	"Tere Pyaar Mein"	Arijit Singh, Nikhita Gandhi	4:26
2.	"Pyaar Hota Kayi Baar Hai"	Arijit Singh, Charan	3:36
3.	"O Bedardeya"	Arijit Singh	5:13
4.	"Show Me The Thumka"	Shashwat Singh, Sunidhi Chauhan	3:56
5.	"Jaadui"	Jubin Nautiyal	3:42
6.	"Maine Pi Rakhi Hai"	Shreya Ghoshal, Divya Kumar	4:07
Total length:			25:00

== Reception ==
Anuj Kumar of The Hindu wrote "Pritam's music is in sync with the pulse of the theme". Prathyush Parasuraman of Film Companion described Pritam's music "sugary", and Bhattacharya's lyrics "witty" and "wily". For the same website, on "the best of Indian film soundtracks", Sharanya Kumar ranked it on the tenth, calling that the songs are "delightfully contemporary and pleasantly familiar". Monika Rawal Kukreja of Hindustan Times wrote "If you a fan of Bollywood music, Tu Jhoothi Main Makkaar won't disappoint you".

Sukanya Verma of Rediff.com ranked "Pyaar Hota Kayi Baar Hai" on the "Top 15 Hindi film songs of 2023" adding that "the sheer infectious notes of this number will have even the ones with left feet burning up the floor". "Tere Pyaar Mein" and "Pyaar Hota Kayi Baar Hai" were ranked at the ninth and thirteenth of "Top 30 Hindi film songs" by Rolling Stone India, and the latter was listed on "Top 10 Hindi film songs" by NDTV, and "the best in Indian film music of 2023" by Scroll.in.

== Accolades ==
Award	Ceremony date	Category	Recipients	Result	Ref.
Filmfare Awards	28 January 2024	Best Music Director	Pritam	Nominated	
Mirchi Music Awards	13 December 2023	Album of The Year	Pritam	Won	
