= Omkar Goswami =

Indian economist

- Born: 29 August 1956 (age 70) (India)

Academic background
- Education: (B.A.)Calcutta University (M.A.) Delhi School of Economics; Delhi University (PhD) University of Oxford

Academic work
- Discipline: Economics

Omkar Goswami is an Indian economist and business journalist for Business India. He is the founder and chairperson of Corporate and Economic Research Group Advisory Private Limited (CERG).

== Early life and education ==
Goswami did his B.A. from St. Xavier's College, Calcutta, and Calcutta University. Omkar Goswami holds a Master's in Economics from the Delhi School of Economics, Delhi University, in 1978, and in 1982 he received the doctor of philosophy in Economics from Oxford University for the thesis "The jute economy of Bengal, 1900–1947: unequal interaction between the industrial, trading, and agricultural sectors" under the supervision of Indian historian Tapan Raychaudhuri.

His daughter, Shahana Goswami, is a film and television actress.

== Career ==
Returning from Oxford, he worked most notably with Lovraj Kumar in the Government of India and had various academic associations. In March 1997, he became Editor of Business India magazine.

Dr. Goswami serves as a Director on the boards of Forbes, Dr. Reddy's Laboratories, DSP Merrill Lynch Fund Managers Limited, Infrastructure Development and Finance Company Limited, Crompton Greaves, Sona Koyo Steering Systems Limited, Ambuja Cements Limited, Cairn India Limited, Infosys, and Bajaj Finserv.

He is the Founder and Chairman of CERG Advisory Private Limited (CERG: Corporate and Economic Research Group).

He held the position of Chief Economist with the Indian business association, the Confederation of Indian Industry, from August 1998 up to March 2004.

== Works ==
- The Jute Economy of Bengal 1900-1947: a study of interaction between the industrial, trading and agricultural sectors. University of Oxford Faculty of Modern History. Published by University of Oxford, 1982.
- Electronics in India, 1985-86 to 1989-90: Targets and Policies : a Report. Published by Association of Indian Engineering Industry, 1984.
- Industry, Trade, and Peasant Society: The Jute Economy of Eastern India, 1900-1947. Oxford University Press, 1991. ISBN 0-19-562701-6.
- Policy reform in India, by Isher Judge Ahluwalia, Rakesh Mohan, Omkar Goswami, Charles Oman. Published by Development Centre, Organisation for Economic Co-operation and Development, 1996.
- Corporate bankruptcy in India: a comparative perspective. Published by OCDE.
- Goras and Desis: Managing Agencies and the Making of Corporate India, by Omkar Goswami, with an introduction by Gurcharan Das. Published by Penguin Random House India, 2016.
