= Filmfare Critics Award for Best Actress =

Hindi-language film award

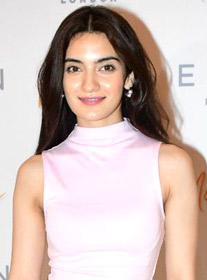
- The 2025 recipient: Pratibha Ranta
- Awarded for: Best Performance by an Actress in a Leading Role - Critics
- Country: India
- First award: Dimple Kapadia, Drishti (1992)
- Currently held by: Pratibha Ranta, Laapataa Ladies (2025)
- Website: Filmfare Awards

The Filmfare Critics Award for Best Actress is given by Filmfare as part of its annual Filmfare Awards for Hindi–language films.

== Superlatives ==
- Tabu holds the record for the maximum number of wins in this category, having won the award 5 times (1998, 2000, 2001, 2008 and 2023), followed by Manisha Koirala (1996, 1997 and 2003) and Rani Mukerji (2003, 2006 and 2024) who have each won the award thrice. and four actresses with 2 awards each (in chronological order): Dimple Kapadia (1992 & 1993), Kareena Kapoor (2005 & 2007), Vidya Balan (2011 & 2022), Bhumi Pednekar (2020 & 2023) and Shefali Shah (1999 & 2024).
- Tabu also holds the record for the maximum number of nominations in the category (6), followed by Taapsee Pannu and Vidya Balan with 5 nominations each, Bhumi Pednekar with 4 nominations, and Manisha Koirala, Rani Mukerji, Kangana Ranaut, Kareena Kapoor and Alia Bhatt with 3 nominations each.
- 3 actresses have won the award in consecutive years; in chronological order, they are Dimple Kapadia (1992–93), Manisha Koirala (1996–97) and Tabu (2000–01).
- There have been 4 ties in 2003, 2020, 2023 and 2024. In 2003, Manisha Koirala and Rani Mukerji were both given the award for Company and Saathiya. In 2020, Taapsee Pannu & Bhumi Pednekar won the award for the same film, Saand Ki Aankh (2019). In 2023, Bhumi Pednekar and Tabu both tied for the award, winning for Badhaai Do and Bhool Bhulaiyaa 2. In 2024, Rani Mukerji and Shefali Shah tied for the award, winning for Mrs. Chatterjee vs Norway and Three of Us.
- Neena Gupta is the eldest recipient, winning the award for Badhaai Ho (2018) at age 59.
- Zaira Wasim is the youngest recipient, winning the award for Secret Superstar (2017) at age 17.
- 9 actresses have won awards in both Best Actress and Best Actress (Critics) categories; in chronological order, they are Dimple Kapadia, Karisma Kapoor, Rani Mukerji, Kareena Kapoor, Vidya Balan, Priyanka Chopra, Kangana Ranaut, Alia Bhatt and Taapsee Pannu. Manisha Koirala have also won Best Actress - Tamil for her performance in Bombay and she is only actress to win critics award for a non hindi film.
- Rani Mukerji is the only actress to win both Best Actress (Critics) and Popular awards during the same year (2006) for Black.
- 11 actresses have won the award without receiving a Best Actress nomination. In chronological order they are: Farida Jalal for Mammo (1995), Manisha Koirala for Bombay (1996) & Company (2003), Shefali Shah for Satya (1999) & Three of Us (2023), Kareena Kapoor for Dev (2005), Tabu for Cheeni Kum (2008), Shahana Goswami for Rock On!! (2009), Mahi Gill for Dev.D (2010), Richa Chadha for Gangs of Wasseypur (2013), Shilpa Shukla for B.A. Pass (2014), and Bhumi Pednekar and Taapsee Pannu both for Saand Ki Aankh (2019). Among these, Shah, Goswami and Chadha were nominated for Best Supporting Actress.
- Tabu, Kareena Kapoor, Priyanka Chopra, Vidya Balan and Kangana Ranaut have all won the Filmfare Award for Best Female Debut, while Dimple Kapadia, Farida Jalal, Karisma Kapoor, Ranaut, Kapoor, Tabu and Chopra have all won Best Supporting Actress. Moreover, Kareena Kapoor has won the Filmfare Special Award, while Taapsee Pannu has also won the Filmfare OTT Award for Best Actress in a Web Original Film.

== Multiple winners ==
Wins	Actress
5	Tabu
3	Manisha Koirala, Rani Mukerji
2	Dimple Kapadia, Kareena Kapoor, Vidya Balan, Bhumi Pednekar, Shefali Shah

== Multiple nominations ==
Nominations	Actress
6	Tabu
5	Taapsee Pannu, Vidya Balan
4	Bhumi Pednekar
3	Manisha Koirala, Rani Mukerji, Kangana Ranaut, Kareena Kapoor, Alia Bhatt

== List of winners ==
=== Outstanding Performance In A Non-Commercial Film ===
(Between 1991 and 1992, there was one special category known as the Outstanding Performance In A Non-Commercial Film, and was awarded without prior nomination to acknowledge an actor of either sex.)

Year	Photos of winners	Actress	Role	Film
1991 (36th)	Award Won by an Actor			
1992 (37th)		Dimple Kapadia ‡	Sandhya	Drishti

=== Critics Award for Best Performance ===
(From 1993 until 1997, there was one special category known as the Critics Award for Best Performance, and was awarded without prior nomination to acknowledge an actor of either sex.)

Year	Photos of winners	Actress	Role	Film
1993 (38th)		Dimple Kapadia ‡	Shanichari	Rudaali
1994 (39th)	Award Won by an Actor			
1995 (40th)		Farida Jalal ‡	Mammo	Mammo
1996 (41st)		Manisha Koirala ‡	Shaila Banu	Bombay
1997 (42nd)		Manisha Koirala ‡	Annie Braganza	Khamoshi: The Musical

=== Critics Award for Best Actress ===
(The category is officially divided into two separate categories to acknowledge both male and female actors individually.)

==== 1990s ====
Year	Photos of winners	Actress	Role	Film
1998 (43rd)		Tabu ‡	Gehna	Virasat
1999 (44th)		Shefali Shah ‡	Pyari Mhatre	Satya

==== 2000s ====
Year	Photos of winners	Actress	Role	Film
2000 (45th)		Tabu ‡	Panna Barve	Hu Tu Tu
2001 (46th)		Tabu ‡	Aditi Pandit	Astitva
2002 (47th)		Karisma Kapoor ‡	Zubeidaa Suleiman Seth	Zubeidaa
2003 (48th)		Manisha Koirala ‡	Saroja	Company
2003 (48th)		Rani Mukerji ‡	Suhani Sharma	Saathiya
2004 (49th)		Urmila Matondkar ‡	Swati	Bhoot
2005 (50th)		Kareena Kapoor ‡	Aalia	Dev
2006 (51st)		Rani Mukerji ‡	Michelle McNally	Black
2007 (52nd)		Kareena Kapoor ‡	Dolly Mishra	Omkara
2008 (53rd)		Tabu ‡	Nina Verma	Cheeni Kum
2009 (54th)		Shahana Goswami ‡	Debbie Mascarenhas	Rock On!!

==== 2010s ====
Year	Photos of winners	Actress	Role	Film
2010 (55th)		Mahi Gill ‡	Parminder "Paro"	Dev.D
2011 (56th)		Vidya Balan ‡	Krishna Verma	Ishqiya
2012 (57th)		Priyanka Chopra ‡	Susanna Anna–Marie Johannes	7 Khoon Maaf
2013 (58th)		Richa Chadda ‡	Nagma Khatun	Gangs of Wasseypur
2014 (59th)		Shilpa Shukla ‡	Sarika	B.A. Pass
2015 (60th)		Alia Bhatt ‡	Veera Tripathi	Highway
2016 (61st)		Kangana Ranaut ‡	Tanuja Trivedi and Kumari Kusum Sangwan	Tanu Weds Manu Returns
2017 (62nd)		Sonam Kapoor ‡	Neerja Bhanot	Neerja
2018 (63rd)		Zaira Wasim ‡	Insia Malik	Secret Superstar
2018 (63rd)		Kangana Ranaut	Julia	Rangoon
2018 (63rd)		Sridevi	Devki Sabarwal	Mom
2018 (63rd)		Swara Bhaskar	Anaarkali	Anaarkali of Aarah
2018 (63rd)		Vidya Balan	Sulochana "Sulu" Dubey	Tumhari Sulu
2019 (64th)		Neena Gupta ‡	Priyamvada "Babli" Kaushik	Badhaai Ho
2019 (64th)		Alia Bhatt	Sehmat Khan	Raazi
2019 (64th)		Anushka Sharma	Mamta Sharma	Sui Dhaaga
2019 (64th)		Radhika Madan	Champa "Badki" Kumari	Pataakha
2019 (64th)		Taapsee Pannu	Aarti Malhotra / Mohammed	Mulk
2019 (64th)		Tabu	Simi	Andhadhun

==== 2020s ====
Year	Photos of winners	Actress	Role	Film
2020 (65th)		Bhumi Pednekar ‡	Chandro Tomar	Saand Ki Aankh
2020 (65th)		Taapsee Pannu ‡	Prakashi Tomar	Saand Ki Aankh
2020 (65th)		Bhumi Pednekar	Indumati Tomar	Sonchiriya
2020 (65th)		Kangana Ranaut	Bobby	Judgementall Hai Kya
2020 (65th)		Radhika Madan	Supriya "Supri"	Mard Ko Dard Nahi Hota
2020 (65th)		Sanya Malhotra	Miloni Shah	Photograph
2021 (66th)		Tillotama Shome ‡	Ratna	Sir
2021 (66th)		Bhumi Pednekar	Kajal "Kitty" Yadav	Dolly Kitty Aur Woh Chamakte Sitare
2021 (66th)		Konkona Sen Sharma	Radha "Dolly" Yadav	Dolly Kitty Aur Woh Chamakte Sitare
2021 (66th)		Sanya Malhotra	Shruti Choksi	Ludo
2021 (66th)		Taapsee Pannu	Amrita Sabarwal	Thappad
2021 (66th)		Vidya Balan	Shakuntala Devi	Shakuntala Devi
2022 (67th)		Vidya Balan ‡	Vidya Vincent	Sherni
2022 (67th)		Supriya Pathak	Amma	Ramprasad Ki Tehrvi
2022 (67th)		Taapsee Pannu	Rani Kashyap	Haseen Dilruba
2023 (68th)		Bhumi Pednekar ‡	Suman "Sumi" Singh	Badhaai Do
2023 (68th)		Tabu ‡	Anjulika Chatterjee and Manjulika Chatterjee	Bhool Bhulaiyaa 2
2023 (68th)		Kajol	Kolavennu Sujata Krishnan	Salaam Venky
2023 (68th)		Neena Gupta	Manju Mishra	Vadh
2023 (68th)		Taapsee Pannu	Mithali Raj	Shabaash Mithu
2024 (69th)		Rani Mukerji ‡	Debika Chatterjee	Mrs. Chatterjee vs Norway
2024 (69th)		Shefali Shah ‡	Shailaja Desai	Three of Us
2024 (69th)		Deepti Naval	Sadhana Tripathi	Goldfish
2024 (69th)		Fatima Sana Shaikh	Shashi Kumar Yadav "Sky"	Dhak Dhak
2024 (69th)		Saiyami Kher	Anina “Ani” Dixit	Ghoomer
2024 (69th)		Shahana Goswami	Pratima Mahto	Zwigato
2025 (70th)		Pratibha Ranta ‡	Jaya Tripathi Singh / Pushpa Rani	Laapataa Ladies
2025 (70th)		Alia Bhatt	Satyabhama "Satya" Anand	Jigra
2025 (70th)		Kareena Kapoor Khan	Jasmeet "Jass" Bhamra	The Buckingham Murders
2025 (70th)		Nitanshi Goel	Phool Kumari	Laapataa Ladies
2025 (70th)		Vidya Balan	Kavya Ganeshan	Do Aur Do Pyaar

== See also ==
- Filmfare Awards
- Bollywood
- Cinema of India
