= Aap Jaisa Koi (film) =

2025 Hindi film by Vivek Soni

- Official release poster
- Directed by: Vivek Soni
- Written by: Radhika Anand; Jehan Handa
- Produced by: Karan Johar; Adar Poonawalla; Apoorva Mehta; Somen Mishra
- Starring: R. Madhavan; Fatima Sana Shaikh; Ayesha Raza; Manish Chaudhary; Namit Das
- Cinematography: Debojeet Ray
- Edited by: Prashanth Ramachandran
- Music by: Songs: Justin Prabhakaran; Rochak Kohli; Score: Justin Prabhakaran
- Production company: Dharmatic Entertainment
- Distributed by: Netflix
- Release date: 11 July 2025
- Running time: 115 minutes
- Country: India
- Language: Hindi

Aap Jaisa Koi (transl. Someone Like You) is a 2025 Indian Hindi-language romantic comedy drama film directed by Vivek Soni and produced by Karan Johar's Dharmatic Entertainment for Netflix. It stars R. Madhavan as Shrirenu Tripathi, a reserved middle-aged Sanskrit professor, and Fatima Sana Shaikh as Madhu Bose, a spirited French language instructor.

== Plot ==
Shrirenu “Shri” Tripathi is a 42-year-old unmarried Sanskrit professor who lives in Jamshedpur. Socially awkward and old-fashioned, he has spent years searching unsuccessfully for a suitable partner. In his youth, he confessed his feelings to a classmate named Rakhee, but when she rejected him, he insulted her, and she slapped him, predicting he would remain lonely and frustrated. Shri now lives with his best friend Deepak, while his elder brother Bhanu Tripathi and sister-in-law Kusum urge him to give up teaching and join the family’s real-estate business. Kusum, however, is unhappy in her marriage and feels trapped in domestic monotony.

One day, Deepak introduces Shri to a dating and chat application called Aap Jaisa Koi, which allows users to talk anonymously with strangers. Initially hesitant, Shri eventually signs up and starts a conversation with a woman whose voice instantly captivates him. Meanwhile, in Kolkata, Madhu Bose, a 32-year-old French-language instructor from a liberal Bengali family, is shown living independently. Madhu is outspoken, modern, and unafraid to express her sexuality, making her the opposite of the reserved Shri. Unknown to him, the mysterious woman he talks to on the app is Madhu herself.

Through family connections, a marriage proposal is soon arranged between Shri and Madhu. Encouraged by Kusum, Shri travels to Kolkata to meet her. Their first meeting in a café goes well, and they are drawn to each other despite their contrasting personalities. Shri’s conservative, patriarchal family clashes with Madhu’s matriarchal and progressive household, creating tension between the two sides. Still, they decide to get engaged.

However, the truth about their earlier interaction on the Aap Jaisa Koi app is accidentally revealed. Shri learns that Madhu was the anonymous woman he had been speaking to and feels deceived. His insecurities and traditional mindset take over, and he ends the engagement, accusing her of impropriety. Madhu defends herself, explaining that being on the app was not shameful but a reflection of her loneliness and desire for genuine connection.

The families become divided as old prejudices and double standards surface. Shri begins to realize the hypocrisy in judging a woman for the same choices that men are allowed to make freely. Parallel to this, Kusum’s discontent with her husband Bhanu reaches a breaking point. She finds emotional comfort in Madhu’s uncle Joy and eventually decides to leave her unfulfilling marriage, asserting her independence and identity.

In the final act, Shri travels to Kolkata to seek forgiveness from Madhu. He confesses that he was wrong to judge her and accepts her on equal terms. Madhu insists that she does not need forgiveness, only equality and respect. When Shri acknowledges this, they reconcile. Kusum, having reclaimed her self-worth, refuses to return to her husband. The story concludes on a hopeful note, with both couples symbolizing emotional maturity, equality, and the breaking of societal barriers.

== Cast ==
- R. Madhavan as Shrirenu "Shri" Tripathi
- Fatima Sana Shaikh as Madhu Bose
- Manish Chaudhary as Bhanu Tripathi, Shri's conservative elder brother
- Ayesha Raza as Kusum Tripathi, Bhanu's wife, Shri's sister-in-law and mother figure, Nisha's mother, and Joy's love interest
- Namit Das as Deepak, Shri's best friend
- Karan Wahi as Namit Aggarwal, Madhu's ex-boyfriend
- Saheb Chatterjee as Joy Bose, Madhu's maternal uncle
- Ananya Chatterjee as Shona, Madhu's maternal aunt
- Divyam Dubey as Kartik, Shri's student
- Beena Banerjee as Madhu's grandmother and matriarch of the Bose family

== Production ==
The film was developed as a Netflix original by Dharmatic Entertainment. The story was conceived by Radhika Anand who also wrote the screenplay, with Jehan Handa coming on board later, and Netflix approached Karan Johar's Dharmatic banner to produce the project. Vivek Soni, who co-wrote and directed Meenakshi Sundareshwar (2021) for Netflix, signed on as director. The film is produced by Karan Johar along with Apoorva Mehta and Somen Mishra under Dharmatic Entertainment.

Aap Jaisa Koi is set between Jamshedpur and Kolkata where Principal photography took place on location.

== Soundtrack ==
Aap Jaisa Koi

Soundtrack album by Rochak Kohli and Justin Prabhakaran
- Released: 27 June 2025
- Recorded: 2024–2025
- Genre: Feature film soundtrack
- Length: 17:44
- Language: Hindi
- Label: Sony Music India
External audio
- Aap Jaisa Koi - Full Album on YouTube

The music of the film is composed by Rochak Kohli and Justin Prabhakaran while lyrics are written by Gurpreet Saini and Raj Shekhar.

Track listing
No.	Title	Lyrics	Music	Singer(s)	Length
1.	"Jab Tu Sajan"	Gurpreet Saini	Rochak Kohli	Mohit Chauhan	4:11
2.	"Mila Tujhe"	Raj Shekhar	Justin Prabhakaran	Vishal Mishra, Prateeksha Srivastava	3:01
3.	"Dhuan Dhuan"	Gurpreet Saini	Rochak Kohli	Sanjith Hegde	3:09
4.	"Saare Jag Mein"	Raj Shekhar	Justin Prabhakaran	Abhay Jodhpurkar, Aanandi Joshi, Umesh Joshi, Vijay Dhuri, Siddhant Karawde, Pragati Joshi, Arohi Mhatre Nayak, Aditi Prabhudesai	4:08
5.	"Jaadu Wali Chimki"	Raj Shekhar	Justin Prabhakaran	Devender Pal Singh, Vidhya Gopal, Vijay Dhuri	3:15
Total length:					17:44

== Release ==
Netflix officially announced the film and its release date in June 2025. The first look poster and trailer were unveiled in late June. Aap Jaisa Koi was released on Netflix on 11 July 2025.

== Reception ==
On the review aggregator website Rotten Tomatoes, 40% of 15 critics' reviews are positive, with an average rating of 5.6/10.

Lachmi Deb Roy Firstpost awarded the film 3 out of 5 stars, praising its treatment of unconventional romance and breaking societal norms. She noted that the film "will make you believe that there is nothing like age‑appropriate love," appreciating its emotional message. However, Roy also criticized the depth of characterization, particularly pointing out that "there is a lack of depth in the characterisation and depiction of Madhu Bose... it definitely could have been better." Shubhra Gupta of The Indian Express gave a 2/5 stars, acknowledging its refreshing portrayal of a forty-something hero confronting insecurities with women. However, Gupta criticized the screenplay for slipping into "staged confrontations-and-resolutions” and retreating into "bland 'safe family space'," which she felt gave the film a "faintly mothballed air".

Rishabh Suri of Hindustan Times gave a 2.5/5, writing that while it starts on an "earnest note", it "soon loses the plot completely". India TV News delivered a critical take with a sharp headline: "tries hard on feminism but fails big time". Rahul Desai of The Hollywood Reporter India reviewed it "A Romcom That's Watched Too Many Romcoms."
