= Tahaan =

Tahaan – A Boy With a Grenade
- Directed by: Santosh Sivan
- Written by: Santosh Sivan; Ritesh Menon; Paul Hardart
- Produced by: Shripal Morakhia; Mubina Rattonsey
- Starring: Purav Bhandare; Anupam Kher; Sarika; Rahul Bose; Rahul Khanna; Victor Banerjee; Fatima Sana Shaikh
- Cinematography: Santosh Sivan
- Edited by: Shakti Hasija
- Music by: Taufique Qureshi
- Distributed by: SPE Films India
- Release date: 5 September 2008
- Country: India
- Language: Hindi

Tahaan – A Boy With a Grenade is a 2008 Indian Hindi-language drama film written and directed by Santosh Sivan. The film is based on the life of a young boy and his pet donkey. It is a fable-like journey of the eponymous eight-year-old boy, whose life revolves around the pursuit to find real purpose in his little world. The film stars Purav Bhandare as the young boy. The film stars Purav Bhandare, Anupam Kher, Sarika, Rahul Bose, Rahul Khanna, Victor Banerjee, and Fatima Sana Shaikh. It was filmed in Jammu and Kashmir.

== Plot ==
After salvaging money using various means, Tahaan goes to reclaim his donkey, Birbal, from a moneylender. He is told that old Subhan Dar has already bought the donkey and gone across the mountains where Tahaan's father went missing. Gathering courage, Tahaan sets out to find the old man. He finds him, and he follows Subhan and his assistant Zafar and their mule train, leading Birbal despite their protests. Although Subhan promises to return Birbal to Tahaan if he can win a race against the incompetent Zafar, he refuses to return Birbal even after winning. Instead, Subhan gives the donkey to his eight-year-old nephew. Zafar tries to give Tahaan his sunglasses as a replacement for the donkey, but Tahaan does not accept the gift.

On his way back home, Tahaan encounters Idrees, a teenager who discourages him, saying that his efforts will not be sufficient to get Birbal back. Instead, he suggests doing him a favour. Tahaan is asked to take a package across the mountains in his onward journey. Upon seeing his eagerness, Idrees hands him over a grenade and says that when the time is right, he will be told what needs to be done. At a checkpoint, the package and grenade are not discovered since the soldiers know and trust Subhan Darr. Tahaan is about to commit a terrorist act with the grenade and has already removed the pin when he changes his mind and throws it safely in a river. He then sees his father emerge from the building he almost blew up.

Subhan's nephew learns that Tahaan is fond of Birbal, and at his request, Subhan gives the donkey back to Tahaan.

== Cast ==
- Purav Bhandare as Tahaan
- Anupam Kher as Subhan
- Rahul Bose as Zafar
- Sarika as Haba, Tahaan's mother
- Victor Banerjee as, Tahaan's Grandfather
- Fatima Sana Shaikh as Zoya, Tahaan's elder sister
- Rahul Khanna as Kuku Saab
- Rasika Dugal as Nadira
- Ankush Dubey as Idrees
- Dheirya Sonech as Yasin
- Tavasvat Singh as Babina

== Production ==
After major commercial releases such as The Terrorist (1999), Asoka (2001), Anandabhadram (2005) and Before the Rains (2007), award-winning director Santosh Sivan got the idea for this film after reading a newspaper report. He formed a fable-like story from the report.

Since Kashmir is a strife-torn area, films are rarely picturised there. However, in the case of this film, Sivan thought that audiences can relate it to the film well. It was only after 18 years that a film was filmed in Kashmir.

While filming in Pahalgam, Sivan realised to his surprise that children were comfortable with guns. It seemed to him that it was a part of everyday life for them. The film makes eloquent use of Quranic verses or azaan, for which the director took help from research scholars in Kashmir.

When shooting there we only wanted to show the real life. I had heard some Quranic verses there at some Dargah. I thought I could use them to send a message of hope. I wanted to use the azaan for a nice purpose, a beautiful thing, not for any wrong deed... At the end I wanted to show the positive power of a dream.

== Soundtrack ==
Tahaan

Soundtrack album by Taufique Qureshi & Kvanaa
- Released: 3 September 2008
- Genre: Feature film soundtrack
- Length: 38:04
- Label: T-Series

Tracklist
No.	Title	Lyrics	Singer(s)	Length
1.	"Jee Lo"	Mehboob	Adnan Sami	04:18
2.	"Mastaan Mastaan" (Modern)	Mehboob	Ritesh Menon	05:15
3.	"Mastaan Mastaan" (Folk)	Fazil Kashmiri	Gulzar Ahmad Ganai	03:39
4.	"Chakhri" (Modern)	Mehboob	Sumedha Karmahe	03:48
5.	"Tahaan" (Victory Theme)			01:16
6.	"Tahaan" (The Beginning)			02:05
7.	"Ha Faqeero"	A.G. Madhosh	Gulzar Ahmad Ganai	06:08
8.	"Agony"			00:47
9.	"The Missing"			01:34
10.	"Hope"			01:24
11.	"Storytelling"			01:08
12.	"Shaft of Light"			02:03
13.	"Kashmiri Pundit's"			01:19
14.	"Idrees's" (Rebel Theme)			01:24
15.	"Dilemma"			00:48
16.	"Tahaan Theme" (Slow)			01:08
Total length:				38:04

== Critical reception ==
The film opened to generally positive reviews. Ziya Us Salam of The Hindu hailed the film as a 'visual poem' and "Responsible cinema, brilliant cinema." Raja Sen of Rediff gave it 4 out of 5 stars, calling it a "must-watch". Rajiv Masand of CNN-IBN called it a "film of great virtue" and gave 3 out of 5 stars. Baradwaj Rangan called it a "film of first-rate performances".

== Awards ==
- Tahaan won a High Commendation in Children's Feature Film section at the 2009 Asia Pacific Screen Awards.
- Tahaan Won Best feature film award, CIFEJ Award (Centre International du Film pour l' Enfant et la Jeunesse)and UNICEF Award at 11th Olympia International Film Festival for Children and Young People in 2008 held at Greece
- Tahaan won "The German Star of India award" at "Bollywood and Beyond" festival at Stuttgart Germany in 2009

== Distribution ==
Tahaan was picked up for US distribution by GKIDS. The film premiered at the Centerpiece Selection of the MIAAC Indian Film Festival, as well as the Starz Denver Film Festival, the St Louis Film Festival, the Three Rivers Film Festival, and the New York/San Francisco International Children's Film Festival.
