= Rocky Aur Rani Kii Prem Kahaani (soundtrack) =

- Soundtrack album cover

Soundtrack album by Pritam
- Released: 31 July 2023
- Recorded: 2021–2023
- Genre: Feature film soundtrack
- Length: 56:21
- Language: Hindi
- Label: Saregama

Pritam chronology
Tu Jhoothi Main Makkaar (2023)	Rocky Aur Rani Kii Prem Kahaani (2023)	The Great Indian Family (2023)
External audio
- Official Audio Jukebox on YouTube

Rocky Aur Rani Kii Prem Kahaani is the soundtrack album of the 2023 Hindi-language romantic comedy family drama film of the same name produced and directed by Karan Johar. Featuring music composed by Pritam and lyrics written by Amitabh Bhattacharya, the album consisted of eight tracks in the film, while also including six alternative takes of the songs, totaling up to 14 in number, running for 56 minutes. The soundtrack was released by Saregama on 31 July 2023, three days after the film's release.

== Development ==
The film marked Pritam's and Bhattacharya's second collaboration with Johar as a director, after their previous collaboration on Ae Dil Hai Mushkil (2016). He described the album as a homage to Hindi film music of the 1960s to the 1990s. Saregama bought the film's music rights for ₹30 crore (US$3.1 million), replacing Sony Music India, which had been the norm label for all of Johar's directorial ventures. He termed it both a strategic and emotional decision, as Saregama (then-named His Master's Voice) had released the music for his company Dharma Production's early films Gumrah (1993) and Duplicate (1998). The sale also allowed Johar to use Saragema's catalogue of old Hindi film music without buying additional rights.

Since the script was heavily steeped in nostalgia, Johar suggested a catalogue of songs that reminded the viewers of 90s romance, essentially through LPs (long play), which changed the structure of the songs. Pritam went with the Jatin–Lalit and Anu Malik style of music and modernised it although the basic core and melody remained the same. Each song in the film had two 'antaras' (transl. paragraphs) that range around five to six minutes, and the second antara had been composed in a way similar to the 1960s Hindi music.

"I understand that once you're hearing a short song, you go back and listen to it again. But when you're hearing a long song, you've been totally fed. It's like a thali, after which you feel Bharpoor (lit. 'exhausted'). So it could've been much more as far as streaming numbers are concerned. But if you're recreating the '90s flavour, it has to feel Bharpoor."

— Pritam, in an interview to Hindustan Times

Although Johar shot full versions of the song, he edited most of them to reduce the length while the audio version still consisted of two 'antaras'. Considering "Tum Kya Mile" he initially had plan for one antara in the song, although Pritam liked the second antara that was sung by Shreya Ghoshal. He decided to go against Saregama's decision to edit the song, and go with a full version, though Pritam felt that it would have affected its streaming numbers. "What Jhumka?" was termed as a catchy term coined by Bhattacharya, for the adaptation of the Asha Bhosle song "Jhumka Gira Re" composed by Madan Mohan from the film Mera Saaya, with the adaptation being performed by Arijit Singh and Jonita Gandhi. On revisiting the classical song, Pritam felt that the soundscape had a certain sense of nostalgia with "Dharmendra performing all those songs" which prompted him to do so.

While composing the background score, he did not go with the usual way of composition, and instead curated the soundscape from retro music elements, which he sampled and reimagined with a groove. Rani's (Bhatt) introduction theme was a Bengali rap, but the string elements were sampled from Laxmikant–Pyarelal's "Mere Naam Hai Jameela" from Night in London (1967), with parts taken from S. D. Burman's "Mere Sapno Ki Rani" from Aradhana (1969). For Rocky's (Singh) theme, he derived the intro theme from "Mast Baharon Ka Main Aashiq" from Farz (1967) and Somen's (Namit Das) theme was derived from "Meri Pyaari Bindu" from Padosan (1968).

== Marketing and release ==
On 27 June 2023, the team announced the first song "Tum Kya Mile" sung by Singh and Ghoshal through a teaser, and the full song was released the following day. Picturised at Jammu & Kashmir with the lead pair, Johar described the song as a homage to the romantic songs in Yash Chopra's films, whom he considered as his mentor. "What Jhumka?" was the second song released as a single on 12 July. The third single, titled "Ve Kamleya" was released on 18 July. The release coincided with a launch event at Delhi, with the lead actors performing the song while Bhatt rapped few verses of the song. The fourth single, titled "Dhindhora Baje Re", was released on 24 July. Johar credited the song's inspiration to the scale and grandeur of Sanjay Leela Bhansali's films. A promotional event was hosted by Spotify featuring Pritam, Singh and Bhatt on 22 July. The 14-song soundtrack, released three days after the film, on 31 July.

== Track listing ==
No.	Title	Singer(s)	Length
1.	"Tum Kya Mile"	Arijit Singh & Shreya Ghoshal	4:38
2.	"What Jhumka?" (co-composer Madan Mohan, co-lyricist Raja Mehdi Ali Khan)	Arijit Singh, Jonita Gandhi & Ranveer Singh	3:33
3.	"Ve Kamleya"	Arijit Singh, Shreya Ghoshal, Shadab Faridi & Altamash Faridi	4:07
4.	"Dhindhora Baje Re"	Darshan Raval & Bhoomi Trivedi	4:14
5.	"Ro Lain De"	Sonu Nigam & Shilpa Rao	3:58
6.	"Kudmayi"	Sachet Tandon	4:27
7.	"Heart Throb"	Dev Negi	3:20
8.	"Saregama Carvaan Medley"	Shashwat Singh & Jonita Gandhi	3:43
9.	"Rani's Intro Theme"	Brianna Supriyo	1:54
10.	"Aaj Jeene Ki Tamanna Hai"	Shashwati Phukan	1:05
11.	"Abhi Na Jaao Chhod Kar"	Anupam Amod & Shoma Bannerjee	1:42
12.	"Tum Kya Mile" (Radio Edit)	Arijit Singh & Shreya Ghoshal	3:14
13.	"Ve Kamleya" (Sufi Version)	Shadab Faridi, Altamash Faridi & Asees Kaur	5:21
14.	"Tum Kya Mile" (Reprisal Edit)	Shreya Ghoshal	3:57
15.	"Kudmayi" (Film Version)	Shahid Mallya	4:25
16.	"Ve Kamleya" (Redux)	Tushar Joshi & Shreya Ghoshal	5:27
17.	"Tum Kya Mile" (Ending Sequence)	Shreya Ghoshal	0:50
18.	"Kudmayi" (Lofi Edit)	Antara Mitra	4:25
19.	"Abhi Naa Jao Chhod Kar" (Reprise)	Shashwat Singh	2:00
20.	"Suno Suno Miss Chatterjee" (composer O.P. Nayyar, lyricist Aziz Kashmiri)	Mohd. Rafi, Ranveer Singh	0:46
Total length:			1:02:46

== Reception ==
Dhaval Roy of The Times of India called the music as "striking" and its visuals being shot "lavishly and beautifully". Proma Khosla of IndieWire wrote "Pritam’s songs are serviceable as always, but no longer the groundbreaking hits he used to deliver". Nandini Ramanath of Scroll.in called "Tum Kya Mile" as the worthy song in the album, but "just about manages to stand out in a movie that has a sharper conversation going on with classic Hindi film music". Anuj Kumar of The Hindu felt that Pritam's music pales in comparison to the old classical Hindi songs, despite his best efforts.

== Accolades ==
Award	Date of the ceremony	Category	Recipients	Result	Ref.
Filmfare Awards	28 January 2024	Best Music Director	Pritam	Nominated	
Filmfare Awards	28 January 2024	Best Lyricist	Amitabh Bhattacharya for "Tum Kya Mile"	Nominated	
Filmfare Awards	28 January 2024	Best Male Playback Singer	Shahid Mallya for "Kudmayi"	Nominated	
Filmfare Awards	28 January 2024	Best Female Playback Singer	Shreya Ghoshal for "Tum Kya Mile"	Nominated	
Filmfare Awards	28 January 2024	Best Female Playback Singer	Shreya Ghoshal for "Ve Kamleya"	Nominated	
FOI Online Awards	26 January 2024	Best Music Director	Pritam	Nominated	
FOI Online Awards	26 January 2024	Best Original Song	Pritam, Amitabh Bhattacharya, Shahid Mallya for "Kudmayi"	Nominated	
FOI Online Awards	26 January 2024	Best Lyricist	Amitabh Bhattacharya for "Ve Kamleya"	Nominated	
Bollywood Hungama Best of 2023	12 January 2024	Best Lyrics	Amitabh Bhattacharya for "Tum Kya Mile"	Honoured	
Bollywood Hungama Best of 2023	12 January 2024	Best Playback Singer (Male)	Arijit Singh for "Tum Kya Mile"	Honoured	
News 18 Reel Awards	9 March 2024	Best Music	Pritam	Nominated	
News 18 Reel Awards	9 March 2024	Best Singer (Male)	Arijit Singh for "Tum Kya Mile"	Nominated	
News 18 Reel Awards	9 March 2024	Best Singer (Female)	Shreya Ghoshal for "Tum Kya Mile"	Nominated	
News 18 Reel Awards	9 March 2024	Best Singer (Female)	Jonita Gandhi for "What Jhumka?"	Nominated	
Pinkvilla Screen and Style Icons Awards	18 March 2024	Best Music Album	Pritam	Nominated	
International Indian Film Academy Awards	28 September 2024	Best Music Director	Pritam	Nominated	
International Indian Film Academy Awards	28 September 2024	Best Playback Singer Female	Shreya Ghoshal for "Tum Kya Mile"	Nominated	
