= Zwigato =

2022 Indian film by Nandita Das

- Directed by: Nandita Das
- Written by: Nandita Das; Samir Patil
- Produced by: Sameer Nair; Deepak Segal; Nandita Das
- Starring: Kapil Sharma; Shahana Goswami
- Cinematography: Ranjan Palit
- Music by: Score: Sagar Desai; Songs: Hitesh Sonik
- Production companies: Applause Entertainment; Nandita Das Initiatives
- Distributed by: Viacom18 Studios
- Release dates: 9 September 2022 (Toronto); 17 March 2023
- Running time: 106 minutes
- Country: India
- Language: Hindi
- Box office: ₹2–3.53 crore

Zwigato is a 2022 Indian Hindi-language drama film directed by Nandita Das. The film is produced by Applause Entertainment and Nandita Das Initiatives. Kapil Sharma and Shahana Goswami star as the leads. The film debuted at the 2022 Toronto International Film Festival. The film was theatrically released on 17 March 2023. At the 69th Filmfare Awards, the film received three nominations, including Critics Best Film and Critics Best Actress

== Plot ==
Based in modern-day Bhubaneswar, Manas Singh Mahto is an ex-factory floor manager who is forced to work as a food delivery rider, grappling with the app on his phone and the world of ratings and incentives. He struggles to make ends meet for his wife, Pratima, a homemaker, his two children, and an ailing mother. Simultaneously, Pratima begins to explore different work opportunities to support his income, from being a masseuse for wealthy women to being a cleaner at a mall. The fears of these new experiences are coupled with the joys of newfound independence.

== Cast ==
- Kapil Sharma as Manas Singh Mahto
- Shahana Goswami as Pratima Mahto
- Gul Panag as herself
- Sayani Gupta as zonal head
- Swanand Kirkire as Govind Raj
- Tushar Acharya as Raghu
- Santanu Panda as Rider 1

== Production ==
The film was extensively shot and set in Bhubaneswar.

== Soundtrack ==
The music of the film was composed by Hitesh Sonik. The lyrics were written by Devanshu And Geet.

Track listing
No.	Title	Lyrics	Singer(s)	Length
1.	"Yeh Raat"	Devanshu, Geet	Sunidhi Chauhan	2:29

== Release ==
The film had its world premiere at the 2022 Toronto International Film Festival at the Contemporary World Cinema section in September 2022. The Film had its Asian premiere at the Busan International Film Festival at 'A Window of Asian Cinema' in October 2022. It was the opening film of the ‘Kaleidoscope section’ at the International Film Festival of Kerala in December 2022.

It was released theatrically on 17 March 2023 to positive reviews from critics. After the theatrical release, the Odisha Government declared the film tax-free in the state.

== Reception ==
=== Critical reception ===
Zwigato received positive reviews from critics. On the review aggregator website Rotten Tomatoes, 100% of 11 critics' reviews are positive, with an average rating of 7.3/10.

Anna M. M. Vetticad in Firstpost wrote "Zwigato is a film of unassuming depth and unobtrusive commentary. Why on earth didn’t someone make this before?" Saibal Chatterjee of NDTV wrote "Unpretentious but unfailingly pertinent. Zwigato hits home with equal measures of power and pathos." SR Praveen from The Hindu wrote, "Deftly weaved. A poignant story of the new working class."

=== Box office ===
The film collected gross of ₹2 crore-₹3.53 crore.

=== Accolades ===
Award	Ceremony date	Category	Recipients	Result	Ref.
Filmfare Awards	28 January 2024	Best Film (Critics)	Nandita Das	Nominated	
Filmfare Awards	28 January 2024	Best Actress (Critics)	Shahana Goswami	Nominated	
Filmfare Awards	28 January 2024	Best Art Direction	Rita Ghosh	Nominated	
