= Avinash Arun =

Indian cinematographer and director

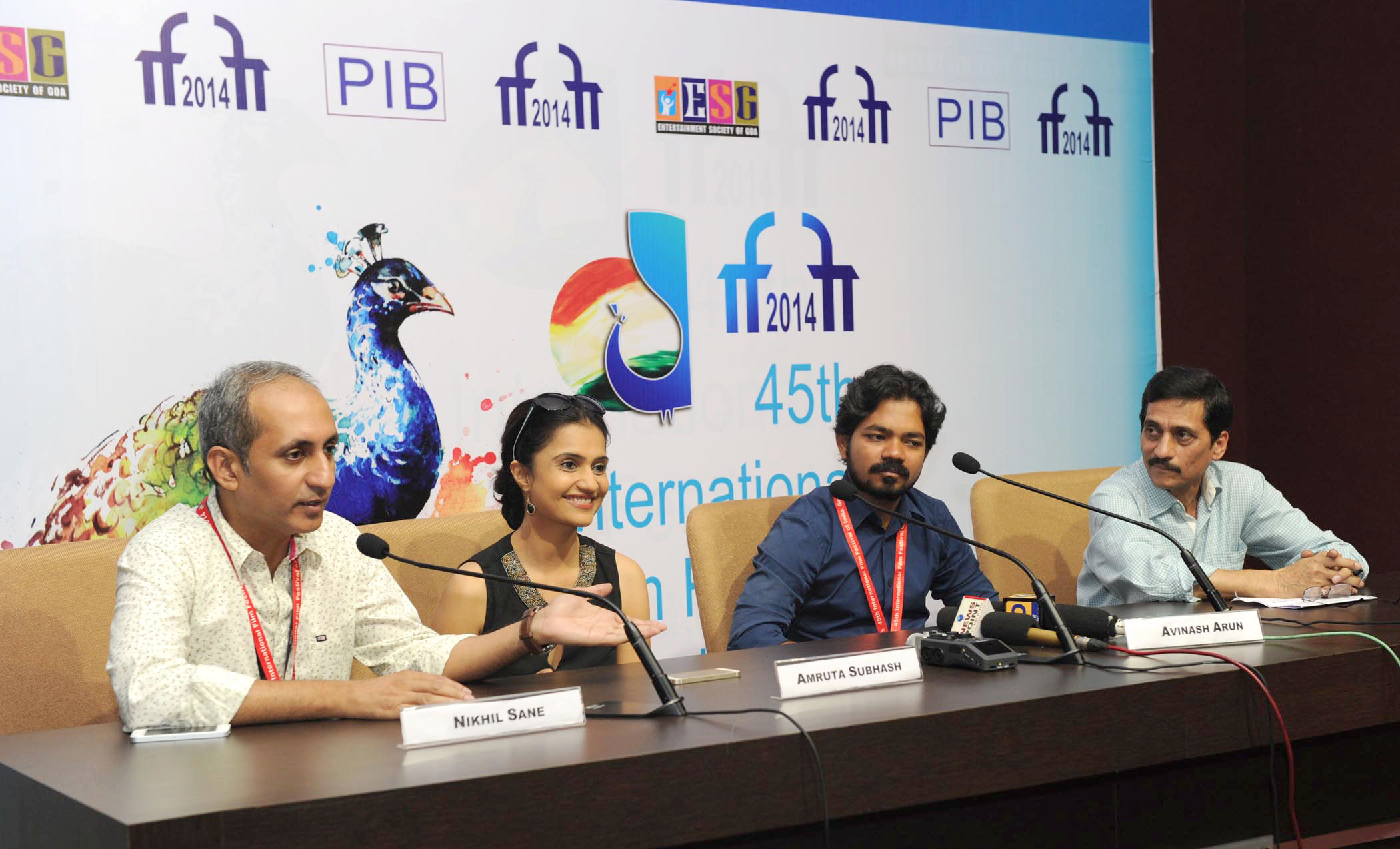
- Avinash Arun, Director of Marathi film 'Killa' addressing a press conference, at the 45th International Film Festival of India (IFFI-2014), in Panaji, Goa on 24 November 2014
- Born: 20 November 1985 (age 40); Solapur, Maharashtra, India
- Occupations: Cinematographer, Film director
- Spouse: Kadambari Kadam (m. 2016; div. 2025)

Avinash Arun (born 20 November 1985) is an Indian cinematographer and film director, most known for his films Killa (2014) and Three of Us (2023). As a cinematographer he has shot Hindi films such as Masaan, Drishyam, Madaari, and Hichki.

His first directorial Marathi film Killa was awarded a Crystal Bear by the children's jury at 64th Berlin International Film Festival. The film was also awarded Best Feature Film in Marathi at 62nd National Film Awards.

== Early life and education ==
Born in Solapur, Maharashtra, Arun grew up in Talegaon, a small town near Pune, where his father was a cotton mill worker. He did a part-time photography course, at a small government institute, which would help local uneducated youth to set up photo studios. Once he completed the course, he started shooting marriage videos and birthday parties. At age 16, he worked as a setting boy (production assistant) in a Marathi film, Devrai (2004). His next assignment was as a production assistant for the diploma film of film director, Umesh Kulkarni, then a student at FTII, Pune. This led to assisting several institute students with their diploma film over the next 5–6 years.

Finally, he joined FTII, Pune in 2006, from where he graduated in cinematography.

== Career ==
In 2013 Avinash worked as a cinematographer in the short film That Day After Every Day. He has also worked as a director of cinematography in 2015 film Masaan. He is working as a cinematographer in Manish Mundra's untitled film. Avinash directed Paatal Lok, a web series produced by Anushka Sharma in the year 2020.

== Filmography ==
Key
†	Denotes film or TV productions that have not yet been released

Year	Title	Cinematographer	Director	Note
2013	That Day After Everyday	Yes	No	Short film
2014	Killa	Yes	Yes	
2015	Drishyam	Yes	No	
2015	Masaan	Yes	No	
2016	Madaari	Yes	No	
2018	Hichki	Yes	No	
2018	Karwaan	Yes	No	
2020	Paatal Lok	Yes	Yes	Amazon Prime Video; Web series
2020	Unpaused	Yes	Yes	Amazon Prime Video; Anthology film
2022	Three of Us	Yes	Yes	
2023	School of Lies	Yes	Yes	Disney+ Hotstar series
2026	Pritam and Pedro	Yes	Yes	JioHotstar series
2026	Prahaar: The Untold Story of Ujjwal Nikam	Yes	Yes	

== Accolades ==
Award	Year	Category	Result	Ref.
Filmfare Awards	2024	Best Film (Critics)	Nominated	
Filmfare Awards	2024	Best Cinematography	Won	
