= Zara Hatke Zara Bachke =

2023 Indian film by Laxman Utekar

- Threatical release poster
- Directed by: Laxman Utekar
- Written by: Maitrey Bajpai; Ramiz Ilham Khan
- Story by: Laxman Utekar
- Produced by: Dinesh Vijan; Jyoti Deshpande
- Starring: Vicky Kaushal; Sara Ali Khan
- Cinematography: Raghav Ramadoss
- Edited by: Manish Pradhan
- Music by: Score: Sandeep Shirodkar; Songs: Sachin–Jigar
- Production companies: Maddock Films; Jio Studios
- Distributed by: Pen Marudhar Cine Entertainment
- Release date: 2 June 2023
- Running time: 132 minutes
- Country: India
- Language: Hindi
- Budget: ₹40 crore
- Box office: est. ₹115.89 crore

Zara Hatke Zara Bachke (transl. Move Aside and Beware), also abbreviated as ZHZB, is a 2023 Hindi-language romantic comedy film directed by Laxman Utekar and produced by Maddock Films and Jio Studios. The film stars Vicky Kaushal and Sara Ali Khan as a small-town married couple striving to own a home.

Zara Hatke Zara Bachke was released in theatres on 2 June 2023 to mixed reviews from critics. Produced on a budget of ₹40 crore, it emerged as a sleeper hit, grossing ₹115.89 crore worldwide. At the 69th Filmfare Awards, the film received four nominations, including Best Music Director and Best Lyricist.

== Plot ==
The story revolves around Kapil and Somya - a middle-class happily married couple from Indore who want to get a house of their own through the Indian government's flagship program: the Awas Yojna scheme. The story starts with Kapil, a yoga instructor, and Somya, a teacher living under a joint family with Kapil's parents and his aunt and uncle staying with them due to which they have to give up their room and sleep in the hall. Somya a Sikh girl from background is often looked down by Kapil's aunt as they are Brahmins. Kapil always tries to intervene and make up to Somya by taking her out for lunch for her favorite food.

Somya always wanted a house of her own and after looking for a house which they both liked, the broker tries to get more money which was discussed when showcasing the house by giving all house rates as expensive. So then they learn about this Awas Yojna and Kapil goes to inquire about it but returns empty-handed as he has had an argument with the employee. However, the peon in the office who also has a side business of settlements and brokerage due to being a government employee gives advice to Kapil and Somya about the scheme and tell them that to be eligible, Kapil either has to be kicked out of their parents' inheritance or Somya should divorce him in order to qualify as a single divorced lady. They initially brush off the idea, but Somya wants her own home so badly that she convinces Kapil to go with the divorce process.

He reluctantly agrees and then a series of comedic events start as they are faking their divorce in front of all including their families. Finally their divorce is approved, but then the broker is caught and the Yojna (scheme) draw results are halted due to which there is an argument between Kapil and Somya, as the former says it was due to Somya's greed he is divorced and they are in this situation just to get some privacy and space of their own. After some time Somya gets the papers of her new home from the Indian Government and she confesses all this to her parents and they all go to Kapil's house and they come clean. But Kapil's aunt faints and is taken to hospital where it is revealed that her liver is failing and she needs urgent transplant.

During this time Somya realizes the importance of family and now no longer wants her separate house. Soon they give the house keys and papers to the security guard of the society they were living as he has a young daughter and doesn't have a house.

After sometime Somya and Kapil remarry and start a happy life.

== Cast ==
- Vicky Kaushal as Kapil Dubey
- Sara Ali Khan as Somya Chawla Dubey
- Inaamulhaq as Ban Das Ishwardas Sahay
- Sushmita Mukherjee as Roshni Chawla
- Neeraj Sood as Purushottam Mama
- Rakesh Bedi as Harcharan Chawla
- Sharib Hashmi as Daroga Raghuvanshi
- Akash Khurana as Ved Prakash Dubey
- Kanupriya Pandit as Deepa Mami
- Anubha Fatehpura as Mamta Dubey
- Himanshu Kohli as Manoj Bhagel
- Srishti Ganguli Rindani as Mehjabeen
- Vivan Shah as Sajjan
- Dimpy Mishra as Dimpy Sir
- Atul Tiwari as Judge

== Soundtrack ==
Zara Hatke Zara Bachke

Soundtrack album by Sachin–Jigar
- Released: 2 June 2023
- Recorded: 2022
- Genre: Feature film soundtrack
- Length: 15:25
- Language: Hindi
- Label: Saregama Music

Sachin–Jigar chronology
Bhediya (2022)	Zara Hatke Zara Bachke (2023)	Aankh Micholi (2023)

Official audio
- Zara Hatke Zara Bachke - Full Album on YouTube

The film's music was composed by Sachin–Jigar, with lyrics written by Amitabh Bhattacharya.

The first single "Phir Aur Kya Chahiye" was released on 16 May 2023. The second single "Tere Vaaste" was released on 22 May 2023. The third single titled "Baby Tujhe Paap Lagega", sung by composer Himesh Reshammiya was released on 25 May 2023. The fourth single "Sanjha" was released on 29 May 2023.

Track listing
No.	Title	Singer(s)	Length
1.	"Phir Aur Kya Chahiye"	Arijit Singh	4:26
2.	"Tere Vaaste"	Varun Jain, Sachin-Jigar, Shadaab Faridi, Altamash Faridi	3:09
3.	"Baby Tujhe Paap Lagega"	Himesh Reshammiya, Sachin-Jigar	2:53
4.	"Sanjha"	Sachet Tandon, Shilpa Rao, Sachin-Jigar	4:57
Total length:			15:25

== Release ==
=== Theatrical ===
Zara Hatke Zara Bachke was theatrically released on 2 June 2023.

=== Home media ===
Zara Hatke Zara Bachke got its OTT release almost 11 months after its theatrical release. It was released on 17 May 2024 on the streaming platform Jio Cinema.

== Reception ==
=== Box office ===
The film earned ₹5.49 crore at the domestic box office on its opening day and a total domestic weekend collection of ₹ 22.59 crore. As of 20 July 2023, the film has grossed ₹104.76 crore (US$11 million) in India and ₹11.13 crore (US$1.2 million) overseas for a worldwide gross collection of ₹115.89 crore (US$12 million).

=== Critical response ===
On the review aggregator website Rotten Tomatoes, 31% of 13 critics' reviews are positive, with an average rating of 5.4/10.

Grace Cyril of India Today rated the film 3 stars out of 5, writing, "Sara Ali Khan, Vicky Kaushal's chemistry is the USP of the film." Amandeep Narang of ABP Live gave the same rating, stating that "Vicky Kaushal, Sara Ali Khan starrer is a light-hearted rom-com done right."

However, Saibal Chatterjee of NDTV rated the film 2 stars out of 5, writing, "The performances from Vicky Kaushal and Sara Ali Khan as the happily married couple are as wildly uneven as the film itself." Shubhra Gupta of The Indian Express also rated the film 2 out of 5 stars, writing, "The film is a tonal switch in its second-half, introducing a plot twist doused in mothballed sentimentality, and adding a dreary sanskari layer to the whole thing."

== Accolades ==
Award	Ceremony date	Category	Recipients	Result	Ref.
Filmfare Awards	28 January 2024	Best Music Director	Sachin–Jigar	Nominated	
Filmfare Awards	28 January 2024	Best Lyricist	Amitabh Bhattacharya for "Tere Vaaste"	Won	
Filmfare Awards	28 January 2024	Best Male Playback Singer	Varun Jain, Sachin-Jigar, Shadaab Faridi, Altamash Faridi for "Tere Vaaste"	Nominated	
Filmfare Awards	28 January 2024	Best Choreography	Ganesh Acharya for "Tere Vaaste Falak"	Nominated	
International Indian Film Academy Awards	28 September 2024	Best Music Director	Sachin–Jigar	Nominated	
International Indian Film Academy Awards	28 September 2024	Best Lyricist	Amitabh Bhattacharya – "Tere Vaaste"	Nominated	
