= Goldfish (film) =

2023 Indian thriller drama film

- Theatrical release poster
- Directed by: Pushan Kripalani
- Written by: Pushan Kripalani; Arghya Lahiri
- Produced by: Amit Saxena
- Starring: Kalki Koechlin; Deepti Naval
- Cinematography: Pushan Kripalani
- Edited by: Pradip Patil
- Music by: Tapas Relia
- Production company: Splendid Films
- Release date: 25 August 2023
- Country: India
- Language: English

Goldfish is a 2023 Indian English-language drama film written and directed by Pushan Kripalani. It stars Kalki Koechlin, Gordon Warnecke and Deepti Naval. It was theatrically released on 25 August 2023. It received critical acclaim.

== Plot ==
Anamika returns to her childhood home when her mother, Sadhana is diagnosed with dementia. With the help of her supportive neighborhood, Anamika tries to reconcile with her mother and at the same time deals with the scars of her childhood.

== Cast ==
- Kalki Koechlin as Anamika Fields
- Deepti Naval as Sadhana Tripathi
- Gordon Warnecke as Bobby Persaud
- Rajit Kapoor as Ashwin Raina

== Release ==
The film was released in theatres on August 25, 2023.

== Reception ==
Goldfish received critical acclaim. On the review aggregator website Rotten Tomatoes, 93% of 14 critics' reviews are positive, with an average rating of 7.4/10.

Shubhra Gupta of Indian Express gave it a rating of 3/5. Archika Khurana of The Times of India gave it a rating of 4/5 and says, "Kalki Koechlin and Deepti Naval’s superb performances bring this touching story to life." NDTV gave it a rating of 4/5 and calls it, "A not-to-be-missed gem."

== Accolades ==
Award	Ceremony date	Category	Recipients	Result	Ref.
Filmfare Awards	28 January 2024	Best Actress (Critics)	Deepti Naval	Nominated	
Filmfare Awards	28 January 2024	Best Background Score	Tapas Relia	Nominated	
