= Shahana Goswami =

Indian actress (born 1986)

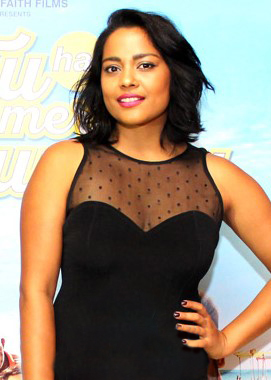
- Goswami in 2017
- Born: 6 May 1986 (age 40); New Delhi, India
- Occupation: Actress
- Years active: 2006–present
- Father: Omkar Goswami

Shahana Goswami (born 6 May 1986) is an Indian actress. She became known for her supporting role in the musical drama film Rock On!! (2008), which won her the Filmfare Critics Award for Best Actress. She was nominated for the Filmfare Award for Best Supporting Actress for her performance in Firaaq (2009). She subsequently featured in films such as Heroine and Midnight's Children (both 2012) as well as the series A Suitable Boy (2020). Goswami has since taken on lead roles in the independent films Zwigato (2023) and Santosh (2024), the latter of which earned her the Asian Film Award for Best Actress.

== Early life and education ==
Shahana Goswami was born on 6 May 1986 in New Delhi, India. She is the daughter of Indian economist and writer Omkar Goswami.

She did her schooling at Sardar Patel Vidyalaya in New Delhi, followed by Sophia College in Mumbai. She excelled at many sports while at school, including artificial wall climbing, athletics, badminton, basketball, and volleyball. She was appointed house captain.

Goswami trained in dance under Padmashri Kiran Segal in Odissi for 10 years, touring and performing with her dance troupe. She had wanted to be an actress as a young girl, and moved to Mumbai to complete her dance training as well as looking into the possibilities of acting as a career.

== Career ==
Goswami started working in theatre with Jaimini Pathak's group, called Working Title, as a production assistant. She then performed on stage in their productions of The Seagull and Arabian Nights.

Through her theatre circle, she met talent consultant Shaanu Sharma, who asked her to audition for a role in Naseeruddin Shah's directorial debut Yun Hota Toh Kya Hota, which was released in 2006. Subsequently, she stumbled upon the small role of Boman Irani's daughter in Reema Kagti's Honeymoon Travels Pvt. Ltd., when she visited the production house for some other work.

A cinematographer who had noticed her work in Yun Hota Toh Kya Hota recommended her and she auditioned for the lead role in Percept Picture Company's Ru Ba Ru (2008), directed by Arjun Bali, with Randeep Hooda as her co-star. This was while she was still in college completing her studies.

Her friends Shaanu Sharma and Simran, who were in the middle of casting for Rock On!! at that time, suggested her name to the director, Abhishek Kapoor. She auditioned for the film and got her big break in the role of Debbie. After the film's release in 2008, her performance earned her the Filmfare Best Actress (Critics) award.

She then appeared in the music video for Dido's Let's Do the Things We Normally Do as a taxi driver in Mumbai. The video was shot by Siddharth Sikand.

She also appeared in the films Firaaq, Jashnn, Mirch, Break Ke Baad, and Tera Kya Hoga Johnny. In 2011 she starred in the action thriller Game and the superhero film, Ra.One.

Goswami's first international project was Deepa Mehta's Midnight's Children (2013), an adaptation of Salman Rushdie's Booker Prize winning novel. She played the female lead in Vara: A Blessing directed by Khyentse Norbu, which was shot in Sri Lanka. She received the Asian Award for best actress for her performance in the film.

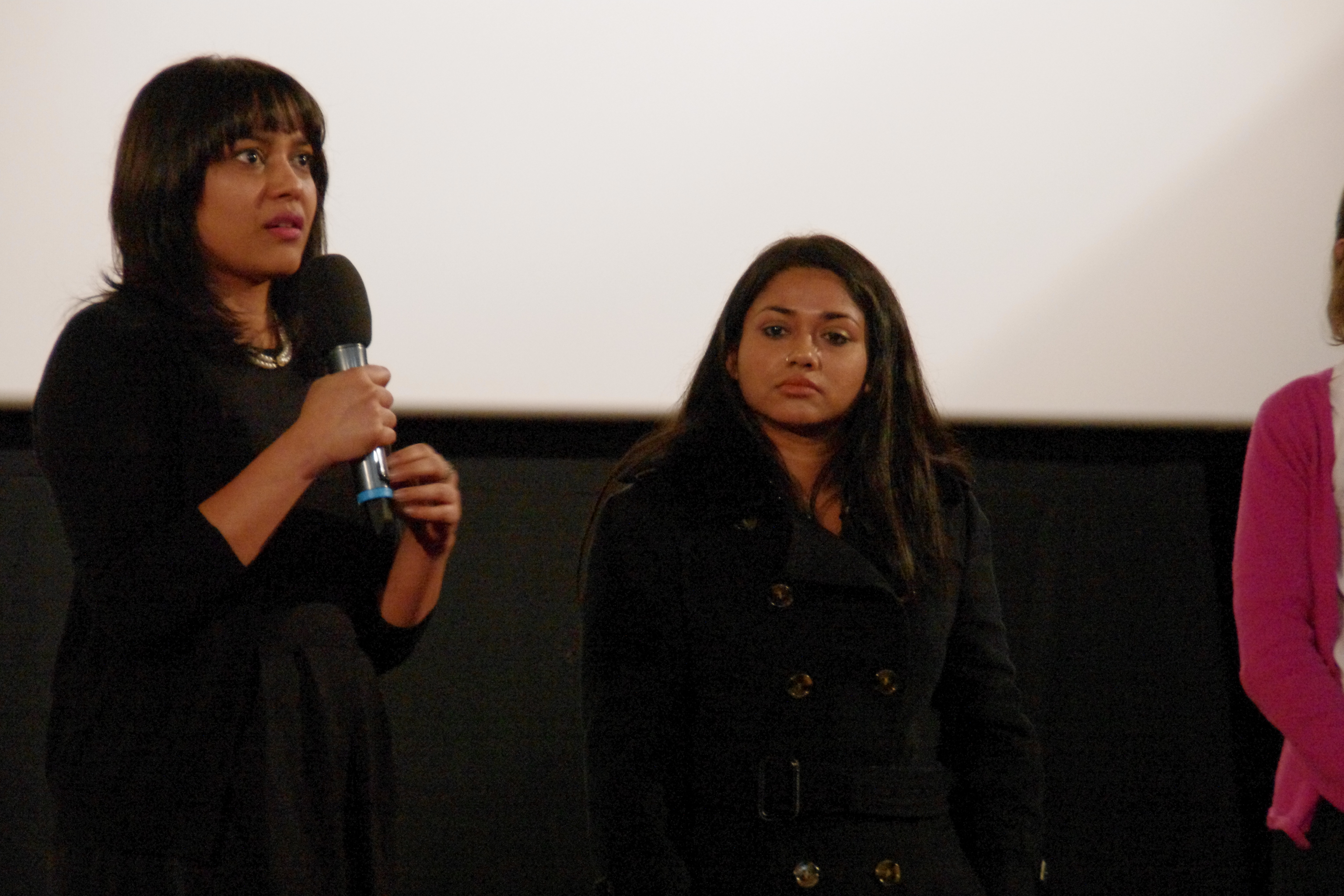
Goswami with Rubayat Hossain (producer and director) - Under Construction - Festival des Cinémas d'Asie - Vesoul 2016

In 2016, she reprised her role as Debbie in Rock On II, and later that year appeared in her first Bengali film, Under Construction.

In 2016, she was cast in one of the lead roles in Tu Hai Mera Sunday, which received positive review from the critics upon its release in 2017. An on-screen kiss with co-star Barun Sobti led to headlines in the media.

Goswami appeared in the 2020 Netflix series Bombay Begums directed by Alankrita Shrivastava, starring Pooja Bhatt, Amruta Subhash, Plabita Borthakur, and Aadhya Anand.

She starred in Zwigato directed by Nandita Das. Set in Bhubaneswar, Odisha, it featured Kapil Sharma as a food delivery rider and Goswami as his wife. The film premiered at the Toronto International Film Festival in September 2023.

In 2024, Goswami appeared in a leading role as Sridevi in the Australian TV drama series Four Years Later on SBS Television

== Filmography ==
Year	Film	Role	Language	Notes	Ref.
2006	Yun Hota Toh Kya Hota	Payal	Hindi		
2007	Honeymoon Travels Pvt. Ltd.	Gina	Hindi		
2008	Rock On!!	Debbie Mascarenhas	Hindi		
2008	Ru Ba Ru	Tara Mishra	Hindi		
2009	Firaaq	Munira	Hindi		
2009	Jashnn	Nisha	Hindi		
2010	Mirch	Ruchi	Hindi		
2010	Break Ke Baad	Nadia	Hindi		
2010	Tera Kya Hoga Johnny	Divya	Hindi		
2011	Game	Tisha Khanna	Hindi		
2011	Ra.One	Jenny Nayar	Hindi		
2012	Midnight's Children	Amina	English		
2012	Heroine	Promita Roy	Hindi		
2013	Vara: A Blessing	Lila	English		
2016	Rock On 2	Debbie Mascarenhas	Hindi		
2016	Force of Destiny	Maya	English		
2016	Under Construction	Roya	Bengali	Bangladeshi film	
2016	Tu Hai Mera Sunday	Kavya	Hindi		
2018	Gali Guleiyan	Saira	Hindi		
2019	Made in Bangladesh	Nasima	Bengali	Bangladeshi film	
2023	Zwigato	Pratima	Hindi		
2023	Neeyat	Lisa, AK's girlfriend	Hindi		
2024	Santosh	Santosh Saini	Hindi		
2024	Despatch	Shweta Bag	Hindi		

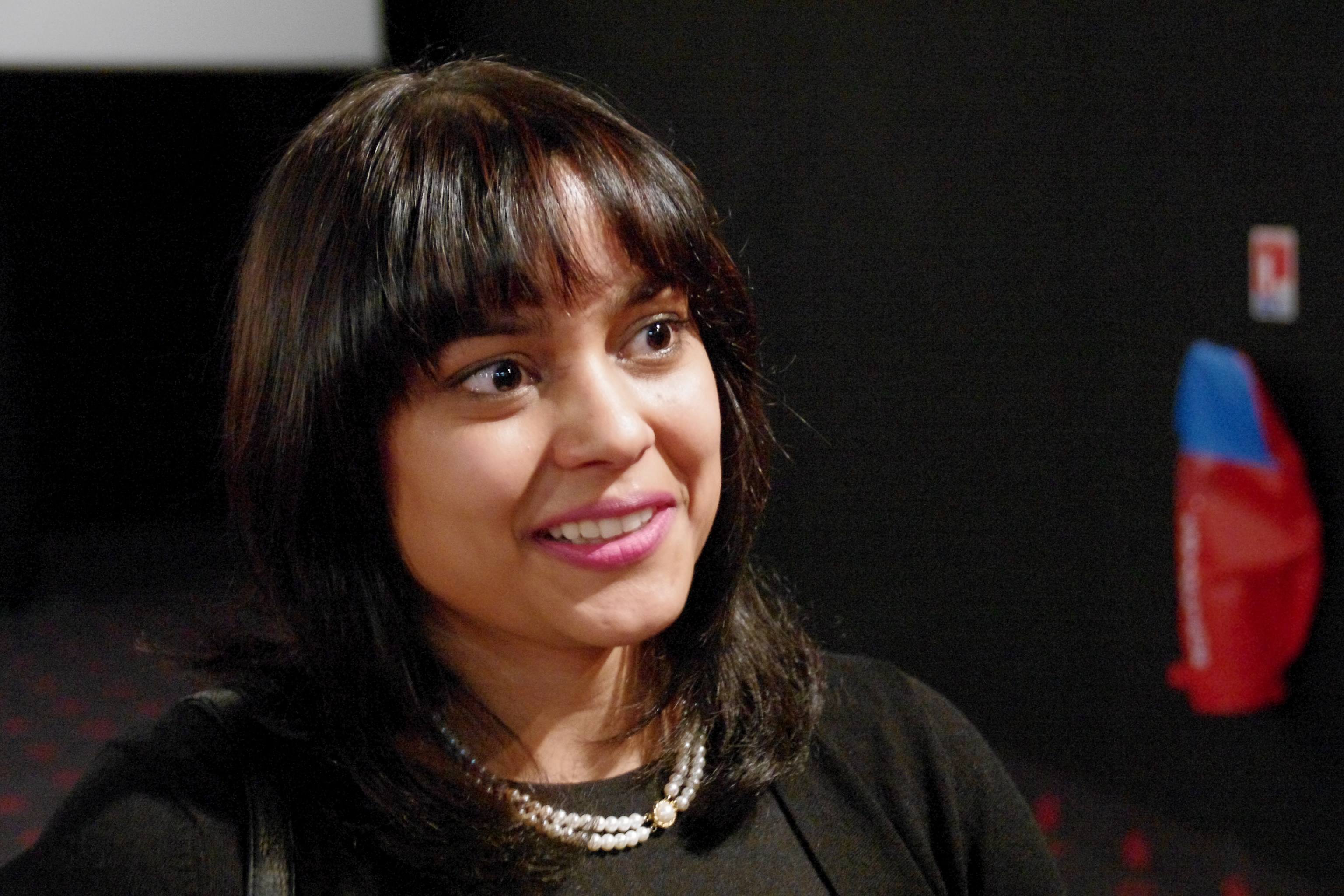
Shahana Goswami - Festival des Cinémas d'Asie - Vesoul 2016

=== Television ===
Year	Title	Role	Notes	Ref.
2020	A Suitable Boy	Meenakshi Chatterji Mehra		
2021	Bombay Begums	Fatima Warsi		
2021	The Last Hour	Lipika Bora		
2022	Hush Hush	Zaira		
2024	Four Years Later	Sridevi	SBS	

== Awards ==
Year	Film	Role	Award	Result	Ref.
2009	Rock On!!	Debbie	Filmfare Award for Best Actress (Critics)	Won	
2009	Rock On!!	Debbie	Star Screen Award for Best Supporting Actress	Won	
2009	Rock On!!	Debbie	Lions Gold Award for Best Supporting Actress	Won	
2009	Rock On!!	Debbie	Cineblitz Award for Best Supporting Actress	Won	
2009	Rock On!!	Debbie	IIFA Award for Best Supporting Actress	Nominated	
2009	Rock On!!	Debbie	Stardust Award for Breakthrough Performance – Female	Nominated	
2009	Rock On!!	Debbie	Filmfare Award for Best Supporting Actress	Nominated	
2010	Firaaq	Muneera	Filmfare Award for Best Supporting Actress	Nominated	
2010	Firaaq	Muneera	Star Screen Award for Best Supporting Actress	Nominated	
2010	Firaaq	Muneera	Stardust Award for Breakthrough Performance – Female	Won	
2010	Firaaq	Muneera	Lions Gold Award for Best Supporting Actress	Won	
2011	Break Ke Baad	Nadia	Jeeyo Bollywood Award for Best Supporting Actress	Nominated	
2016	Under Construction	Roya	Best Actress, Festival de Cine de Islantilla - Spain	Won	
2024	Zwigato	Pratima Mahto	Filmfare Critics Award for Best Actress	Nominated	
2025	Santosh	Santosh Saini	Asian Film Award for Best Actress	Won	
