= Dhak Dhak =

2023 drama film by Tarun Dudeja

- Theatrical release poster
- Directed by: Tarun Dudeja
- Written by: Parijat Joshi; Anvita Dutt
- Produced by: Ajit Andhare; Aayush Maheshwari; Kevin Vaz; Pranjal Khandhdiya; Taapsee Pannu
- Starring: Ratna Pathak Shah; Dia Mirza Rekhi; Fatima Sana Shaikh; Sanjana Sanghi
- Cinematography: Sreechith Vijayan Damodar
- Edited by: Manish Sharma
- Music by: Songs: Jasmine Sandlas; Rishi Dutta; Osho Jain; Mohan Kannan; Anurag Saikia; Raghav–Arjun; Background Score: Anurag Saikia
- Production companies: BLM Pictures; Outsider Films Productions; Viacom18 Studios
- Distributed by: Viacom18 Studios
- Release date: 13 October 2023
- Running time: 137 minutes
- Country: India
- Language: Hindi

Dhak Dhak is a 2023 Indian Hindi-language road adventure drama film written and directed by Tarun Dudeja and produced by Ajit Andhare, Kevin Vaz, Pranjal Khandhdiya and Taapsee Pannu under the banner of BLM Pictures, Outsider Films Productions and Viacom18 Studios. It stars Ratna Pathak Shah, Dia Mirza Rekhi, Fatima Sana Shaikh and Sanjana Sanghi. The film was released on 13 October 2023. At the 69th Filmfare Awards, the film received three nominations, including Best Actress (Critics) for Shaikh and Best Supporting Actress for Shah.

== Plot ==
Four women set out on a motorcycle road trip to the highest motorable pass in the world.

== Cast ==
- Ratna Pathak Shah as Manpreet Kaur Sethi "Mahi"
- Dia Mirza Rekhi as Uzma Shaikh
- Fatima Sana Shaikh as Shashi Kumar Yadav "Sky"
- Sanjana Sanghi as Manjari Bhatt alias "Lali"
- Hrriday Malhotra as Nishant Kakkar
- Harshpal Singh as Prabjyot "Prabhi", Mahi's grandson and Sky's friend
- Dheerendra Dwivedi as Shabbir, Uzma's husband
- Kallirroi Tziafeta as Martha
- Ozgur Kurt as Bernett
- Poonam Gurung as Kung Fu Nun

== Production ==
In May 2022, the film was announced by Viacom 18 Motion Pictures and stars Ratna Pathak Shah, Dia Mirza, Fatima Sana Shaikh and Sanjana Sanghi. The principal photography of the film began in May 2022. The filming took place in Greater Noida, New Delhi, followed by Manali, Himachal Pradesh before moving on to Leh, Ladakh, and it was shot across 83 locations. The filming was completed in 40 days and wrapped up in June 2022.

== Soundtrack ==
Dhak Dhak

Soundtrack album by Jasmine Sandlas, Rishi Dutta, Osho Jain, Mohan Kannan, Anurag Saikia, Raghav & Arjun
- Released: 13 October 2023
- Genre: Feature film soundtrack
- Length: 27:55
- Language: Hindi
- Label: Zee Music Company

Singles from Dhak Dhak
- 1. "Dhak Dhak - Title Track (Re Banjara)" Released: 6 October 2023

Track listing
No.	Title	Lyrics	Music	Singer(s)	Length
1.	"Akhiyan Criminal"	Jasmine Sandlas	Jasmine Sandlas	Jasmine Sandlas	3:01
2.	"Dhak Dhak - Title Track (Re Banjara)"	Kundan Vidyarthi, Baba Bulleh Shah	Rishi Dutta	Sunidhi Chauhan, Jatinder Singh	3:53
3.	"Sadke Sadke"	Osho Jain	Osho Jain	Rashmeet Kaur	2:28
4.	"Miltay Hain Na"	Mohan Kannan	Mohan Kannan, Aditya Pushkarna	Mohan Kannan	3:57
5.	"Safar Pe Chale"	Avinash Chouhan	Anurag Saikia	Amit Trivedi	3:14
6.	"Woh Tara"	Raghav, Arjun	Raghav, Arjun	Shannon Donald, Shashaa Tirupati	3:48
7.	"Udd Udd"	Gurpreet Saini	Shruti Pathak	Shruti Pathak	3:00
8.	"Farzi Duniya"	Kundan Vidyarthi	Rishi Dutta	Shruti Pathak, Shivangi Bhayana	4:34
Total length:					27:55

== Reception ==
On the review aggregator website Rotten Tomatoes, 70% of 10 critics' reviews are positive, with an average rating of 6.3/10.

Reviewing the movie, Sajesh Mohan of Onmanorama wrote, "embarking on a journey to Khardung La on Royal Enfield Bullets is a promise of adventure in itself. Yet, director Tarun Dudeja, in his debut film, takes it a step further by forming an all-women biker gang. This ride turns into an unforgettable pilgrimage with the charming and evergreen Ratna Pathak Shah as Mahi, Dia Mirza as Uzma, Fatima Sana Shaikh as Sky, and Sanjana Sanghi as Manjari. Tarun, collaborating with co-writer Parijat Joshi, assembles this group of riders from the bustling streets of Delhi. It's a world where the trials and tribulations of Mahi, Uzma, Sky, and Manjari all converge on a single theme—the experience of being women in a prejudiced and predatory patriarchal society." A critic from Bollywood Hungama rated the film 2.5/5 stars and wrote "Dhak Dhak is a well-intentioned genuine effort laced with some fine performances by the leading ladies. But due to a weak second half and negligible buzz, the film will suffer at the box office."

In a less positive review, Shubhra Gupta of The Indian Express wrote "The Ratna Pathak Shah, Dia Mirza starrer is a patchy effort." But she added, "Dhak Dhak’ starts off with many of the expected tropes playing out in a movie of this kind. Very different women, from different walks of life. Troubled past. Conflicted present. All looking for a way out, a way forward. Bumps on the road. Breakdowns of men and machines. And finally, that most elusive, precious element, the connection which binds us despite our differences."

In a slightly negative review, Prathyush Parasuraman of Film Companion said, "Road Trip to Nowhere" with "inane and predictable" plot elements in the second half.

== Sequel ==
A sequel, Dhak Dhak 2, has been confirmed by actress Sanjana Sanghi, who played the character of Manjari. Sanjana Sanghi shared the news of Dhak Dhak 2 on her social media.

== Accolades ==
Award	Ceremony date	Category	Recipients	Result	Ref.
Filmfare Awards	28 January 2024	Best Actress (Critics)	Fatima Sana Shaikh	Nominated	
Filmfare Awards	28 January 2024	Best Supporting Actress	Ratna Pathak Shah	Nominated	
Filmfare Awards	28 January 2024	Best Story	Parijat Joshi and Tarun Dudeja	Nominated	
Filmfare Awards	28 January 2024	Best Debut Director	Tarun Dudeja	Won	
