= Three of Us (film) =

2022 Indian film

- Theatrical Release Poster
- Directed by: Avinash Arun
- Written by: Avinash Arun; Omkar Achyut Barve; Arpita Chatterjee
- Dialogues by: Varun Grover; Shoaib Zulfi Nazeer
- Produced by: Sanjay Routray; Sarita Patil; Dikssha Jyote Routray; Bunny Vas
- Starring: Shefali Shah; Jaideep Ahlawat; Swanand Kirkire
- Cinematography: Avinash Arun
- Edited by: Sanyukta Kaza
- Music by: Alokananda Dasgupta
- Production companies: Allu Entertainment; Matchbox Shots
- Distributed by: Karmic Films
- Release dates: 24 November 2022 (IFFI); 3 November 2023 (India)
- Running time: 99 minutes
- Country: India
- Language: Hindi

Three of Us is a 2022 Indian Hindi-language drama film co-written and directed by Avinash Arun. It stars Shefali Shah as Shailaja Desai, who has been diagnosed with dementia. Swanand Kirkire plays her husband Dipankar and Jaideep Ahlawat plays her childhood sweetheart, Pradeep Kamat.

Three of Us premiered at the International Film Festival of India on 24 November 2022. It was released in Indian theatres nearly a year later, on 3 November 2023. At the 69th Filmfare Awards, the film received eight nominations and won for Critics Best Actress (Shah) and Best Cinematography.

== Plot ==
Struggling with dementia, Shailaja takes a trip to revisit her childhood and confronts her traumatic past. Traveling with two men, her husband and childhood love, along the Konkan coastline, she seeks forgiveness and liberation.

== Cast ==
- Shefali Shah as Shailaja Desai
- Jaideep Ahlawat as Pradeep Kamat
- Swanand Kirkire as Dipankar Desai
- Kadambari Kadam as Sarika Kamat
- Rasika Agashe as Gayatri Jayant
- Ojasvi Berde as Riddhi, elder daughter of Pradeep and Sarika
- Radha Dharana as Katha, younger daughter of Pradeep and Sarika
- Sharvari Lohokare as Gauri, Shailaja's friend
- Shruja Prabhudesai as Rupali Kurankar
- Neena Kulkarni as Mrs Kurankar, Shailaja and Pradip's English Teacher
- Payal Jadhav as Manjiri
- Umesh Jagtap as Sawant
- Suhita Thatte as Pramila

== Reception ==
=== Critical response ===
On the review aggregator website Rotten Tomatoes, 90% of 10 critics' reviews are positive, with an average rating of 6.7/10.

Renuka Vyavahare of The Times of India scored the film at 3 out of 5 stars and says "Revolving around the passage of time, nostalgia, closure, and stillness… ‘Three of Us’ is meditative and melancholic. However, like a dwindling memory, the film feels lost and unsure of what it wants to say at regular intervals.". Prateek Sur of Outlook gave the film five out of five stars, describing it as the best film of the year, and calling it "a masterpiece in acting". Udita Jhunjhunwala of Mint labeled the film "unhurried and intimate".

== Accolades ==
Award	Ceremony date	Category	Recipients	Result	Ref.
Filmfare Awards	28 January 2024	Best Film (Critics)	Avinash Arun	Nominated	
Filmfare Awards	28 January 2024	Best Cinematography	Avinash Arun	Won	
Filmfare Awards	28 January 2024	Best Actress (Critics)	Shefali Shah	Won	
Filmfare Awards	28 January 2024	Best Actor (Critics)	Jaideep Ahlawat	Nominated	
Filmfare Awards	28 January 2024	Best Screenplay	Avinash Arun, Omkar Achyut Barve and Arpita Chatterjee	Nominated	
Filmfare Awards	28 January 2024	Best Dialogue	Varun Grover and Shoaib Zulfi Nazeer	Nominated	
Filmfare Awards	28 January 2024	Best Background Score	Alokananda Dasgupta	Nominated	
Filmfare Awards	28 January 2024	Best Sound Design	Vinit D'Souza	Nominated	
