= Tarun Dudeja =

Indian film director and actor

Tarun Dudeja is an Indian film director, writer and actor. He is known for directing the film Dhak Dhak.

== Career ==
In 2023, Tarun directed Dhak Dhak, a film that focuses on the journey and self-discovery of its four female protagonists. It initially received lukewarm response during its theatrical release, but then the film found a substantial audience following its release on OTT. Following the success of Dhak Dhak on digital platforms, Tarun confirmed the development of a sequel.

Tarun collaborated with Ishita Moitra on the screenplay of Bad Newz.

== Filmography ==
List of film credits of Tarun Dudeja
Year	Film	Credit as		Notes
Year	Film	Director	Writer	Notes
2020	Unpaused	No	Yes	
2022	Jugaadistan	No	Yes	
2023	Dhak Dhak	Yes	No	Debut as director
2024	Bad Newz	No	Yes	

As actor
Year	Film	Notes
2019	Gandii Baat	Season 3, Episode 3 - "Sonam Chadh Gayi"
2020	Shrikant Bashir	
2024	Bad Newz	

== Accolades ==
List of Tarun Dudeja awards and nominations
Year	Category	Nominated work	Result	Ref.
Filmfare Awards
2024	Best Story	Dhak Dhak	Nominated	
2024	Best Debut Director	Dhak Dhak	Won	
