= Fatima Sana Shaikh =

Indian film actress (born 1992)

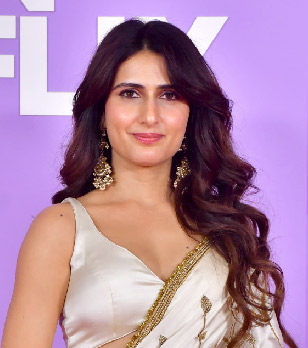
- Shaikh in 2025
- Born: 11 January 1992 (age 34); Hyderabad, Telengana, India
- Occupation: Actress
- Years active: 1997–present

Fatima Sana Shaikh (born 11 January 1992) is an Indian actress, who works in Hindi films. Shaikh started her career as a child artist in such films as Chachi 420 (1997) and One 2 Ka 4 (2001). In 2016, she portrayed wrestler Geeta Phogat in the biopic Dangal, which went on to become the highest-grossing Hindi film of all time. She has since starred in the streaming projects Ludo (2020), Ajeeb Daastaans (2021) and Modern Love Mumbai (2022), and portrayed Indira Gandhi in the biographical drama Sam Bahadur (2023). For her performance in Dhak Dhak (2023), she was nominated for the Filmfare Critics Award for Best Actress.

== Early life ==
Shaikh was born on 11 January 1992 in Hyderabad, Andhra Pradesh, and brought up in Mumbai. Her father Vipin Sharma, is a Hindu from Jammu and her mother Raj Tabassum, is a Muslim from Srinagar. Shaikh identifies as an atheist. She also has an older brother named Shaanib Sharma. She had gained experience in photography prior to becoming an actress.

Fatima has opened up about her personal experiences of living with epilepsy to help raise awareness of the neurological condition.

== Career ==
Shaikh began her career as a child artist in Chachi 420 and One 2 Ka 4. Years later, she played Zoya in the Indian drama film Tahaan, which received "The German Star of India award" at the Bollywood and Beyond festival at Stuttgart, Germany in 2009.

Shaikh was selected for Nitesh Tiwari's biographical sports film Dangal along with Sanya Malhotra, who had never acted before. Shaikh was chosen to portray Geeta Phogat. To prepare for her role, she watched several videos on wrestling to understand "how wrestlers move, walk, their body language". Both Malhotra and Shaikh went through five rounds of auditions, physical training and workshops with Tiwari and Aamir Khan. They were trained by coach and former wrestler Kripa Shankar Patel Bishnoi. Released in 2016, Dangal received critical acclaim and became the highest-grossing Indian film ever with earnings of more than ₹2,000 crore (US$210 million) worldwide. Anupama Chopra stated in her review that Shaikh was "terrific" in the film.

In 2018, Shaikh played Zafira Baig, a warrior-archer thug in the epic action-adventure film, Thugs of Hindostan. It underperformed at the box office. In 2020, she first played a wife struggling for her husband's innocence in Ludo opposite Rajkummar Rao. She then played a traditional girl opposite Diljit Dosanjh in Suraj Pe Mangal Bhari. In 2021, Shaikh played an unhappy wife having an affair opposite Jaideep Ahlawat in Ajeeb Daastaans.

Shaikh had two releases in 2022. She first played a Kashmiri housemaid and a wife realising her worth in a segment of the series Modern Love Mumbai, opposite Bhupendra Jadawat. Anuj Kumar of The Hindu noted, "Fatima's performance makes her segment fly. Under Shonali's watch, she is both flower and fire at the same time." She then played a Rajasthani woman opposite Harshvardhan Kapoor in Thar. Taran Adarsh was appreciative of her lovely performance. The film earned her a nomination at the Filmfare OTT Awards for Best Actress in a Web Original Film.

Shaikh started 2023 with Dhak Dhak, where she played a female motorbike traveller. Her performance earned her nomination for Filmfare Critics Award for Best Actress. Following this, Shaikh portrayed Indira Gandhi alongside Vicky Kaushal and Sanya Malhotra in Sam Bahadur, a film based on the life of Sam Manekshaw. It was a moderate success at the box office. While Mayank Shekhar found her performance to be "admirable", Prannay Pathak was critical of her "unsteady portrayal".

In her first release of 2025, Shaikh played a working wife facing unplanned pregnancy opposite Ali Fazal in Metro... In Dino. Titas Chowdhury noted, "Fazal and Shaikh's chemistry is palpable and Fatima truly is a revelation". Later, she played a spirited French instructor opposite R. Madhavan in Aap Jaisa Koi.

Shaikh was ranked in The Times Most Desirable Women at No. 48 in 2020.

== Filmography ==
Key
†	Denotes films that have not yet been released

=== Films ===
Year	Title	Role	Notes	Ref.
1997	Ishq	Cameo appearance	Child artist	
1997	Chachi 420	Bharti Ratan	Child artist	
1999	Bade Dilwala	Baby Sana	Child artist	
1999	Khoobsurat	Gudiya	Child artist	
2001	One 2 Ka 4	Inspector Abbas' youngest daughter	Child artist	
2008	Tahaan	Zoya		
2012	Bittoo Boss	Priya		
2013	Akaash Vani	Sumbul		
2015	Nuvvu Nenu Okkatavudam	Sruti	Telugu film	
2016	Dangal	Geeta Phogat		
2018	Thugs of Hindostan	Zafira Baig		
2020	Ludo	Pinky Jain		
2020	Suraj Pe Mangal Bhari	Tulshi "Tina" Rane		
2021	Ajeeb Daastaans	Lipakshi	Segment: "Majnu"	
2022	Thar	Chetna		
2023	Dhak Dhak	Shashi "Sky" Kumar Yadav		
2023	Sam Bahadur	Indira Gandhi		
2025	Metro... In Dino	Shruti Shukla Arya		
2025	Aap Jaisa Koi	Madhu Bose		
2025	Gustaakh Ishq	Minni		
2027	Police Company †	TBA	Filming	

=== Television ===
Year	Title	Role	Notes	Ref.
2002–2004	Kitty Party	Unknown		
2009	Ladies Special	Geeti Shinde		
2009	Agle Janam Mohe Bitiya Hi Kijo	Suman		
2011	Best of Luck Nikki	Richa Shenoy	Special appearance in "Boys Meet Girls"	
2022	Modern Love Mumbai	Lalzari "Lali"	Segment: "Raat Rani"	
2026	Hunkkaar	ACP Jasleen Singh Soin	JioHotstar series	
2026	Teen Kauwe †	TBA	Amazon Prime Video series	

=== Music videos ===
Year	Title	Singer	Notes	Ref.
2015	"Tujhse Meri"	Aditya Salankar		
2020	"Palkein Kholo"	Vishal Bhardwaj	Also director	

== Accolades ==
Year	Award	Category	Work	Result	Ref.
2017	Screen Awards	Best Actress – Popular Choice	Dangal	Nominated	
2017	Jackie Chan Action Movie Awards	Best Action Actress	Dangal	Won	
2019	Jackie Chan Action Movie Awards	Best Action Actress	Thugs of Hindostan	Won	
2022	Filmfare OTT Awards	Best Actor in a Web Original Film – Female	Thar	Nominated	
2024	Filmfare Awards	Best Actress – Critics	Dhak Dhak	Nominated	
