= List of Hindi films of 2026 =

This is a list of Hindi language films produced in Bollywood in India that are scheduled to be released in the year 2026.

== Box office collection ==
The following is the list of highest-grossing Hindi cinema films released in 2026.

Background shading indicates that a film is currently showing in theatres worldwide.

Highest grossing Hindi cinema films of 2026
Rank	Title	Production company	Distributor	Worldwide gross	Ref.
1	Dhurandhar: The Revenge	B62 Studios; Jio Studios	Jio Studios	₹1,852.44 crore	
2	Ramayana: Part 1	Prime Focus Studios; Monster Mind Creations; DNEG	Dharma Productions; Sony Pictures Releasing; Sri Venkateswara Creations; AVA Productions; E4 Entertainment; Think Studios; Monster Mind Creations	₹1,651 crore	
3	Drishyam: The Conclusion	Panorama Studios; Star Studio18	Panorama Studios; Star Studio18; Zee Studios	₹577.42 crore	
4	Border 2	T-Series Films; J. P. Films	AA Films	₹464.50 crore	
5	Hanuman Ansh	Swambhu Media Network; Holy Cow Home Productions	Cinépolis; Panorama Studios; Hombale Films	₹442.63 crore	
6	Mirzapur: The Movie	Excel Entertainment; Amazon MGM Studios	AA Films	₹325.10 crore	
7	Bhooth Bangla	Balaji Motion Pictures; Cape of Good Films	Pen Marudhar	₹247.28 crore	
8	Dhamaal 4	T-Series Films; Devgn Films; Panorama Studios; Maruti International	Panorama Studios; Cinépolis	₹224.61 crore	
9	Awarapan 2	Vishesh Films	Pen Marudhar	₹213.89 crore	
10	Welcome to the Jungle	Star Studio18; Cape of Good Films; Base Industries Group; Seeta Films	Star Studio18	₹186.84 crore	

== January–March ==
Opening		Title	Director	Cast	Studio (production house)	Ref.
J A N	1	Ikkis	Sriram Raghavan	Dharmendra; Agastya Nanda; Jaideep Ahlawat; Simar Bhatia	Maddock Films	
J A N	2	Azad Bharath	Roopa Iyer	Shreyas Talpade; Roopa Iyer; Suresh Oberoi; Indira Tiwari	Zee Studios, India Classic Arts, Transindia Media	
J A N	16	Rahu Ketu	Vipul Vig	Pulkit Samrat; Varun Sharma; Shalini Pandey	Zee Studios, BLive Productions	
J A N	16	Happy Patel: Khatarnak Jasoos	Vir Das; Kavi Shastri	Vir Das; Mona Singh; Mithila Palkar; Sharib Hashmi	Aamir Khan Productions	
J A N	16	Bihu Attack	Suzad Iqbal Khan	Dev Menaria; Arbaaz Khan; Daisy Shah; Yukti Kapoor; Rahul Dev	PKS Films Production House	
J A N	16	One Two Cha Cha Chaa	Abhishek Raj; Rajneesh Thakur	Lalit Prabhakar; Anant Joshi; Ashutosh Rana; Abhimanyu Singh; Mukesh Tiwari; Harsh Mayar; Nyrraa M Banerji	Pellucidar Production	
J A N	16	Safia/Safdar	Baba Azmi	Naseeruddin Shah; Kanwaljit Singh; Aditi Subedi; Neetu Pandey; Mehrin Saba; Siddharth Menon	Zee Studios, Azmi Pictures, Filmstoc, ZEE5	
J A N	23	Border 2	Anurag Singh	Sunny Deol; Varun Dhawan; Diljit Dosanjh; Ahan Shetty; Mona Singh; Sonam Bajwa; Anya Singh; Medha Rana	T-Series Films, J. P. Films	
J A N	30	Gandhi Talks	Kishor Pandurang Belekar	Vijay Sethupathi; Arvind Swamy; Aditi Rao Hydari; Siddharth Jadhav	Zee Studios, Kyoorius, Pincmoon Meta Studios, Moviemill	
J A N	30	Human Cocaine	Sarim Momin	Pushkar Jog; Ishita Raj; Siddhanth Kapoor; Zakir Hussain	Scarlet Slate Studios, Vinelight, Textstep Services, Goosebumps Entertainment	
J A N	30	Mayasabha – The Hall of Illusion	Rahi Anil Barve	Jaaved Jaaferi; Mohammad Samad; Veena Jamkar; Deepak Damle	Astonia Media Entertainment, The Third Eye Kreative Films, Zirkon Films	
J A N	30	Mardaani 3	Abhiraj Minawala	Rani Mukerji; Janki Bodiwala; Mallika Prasad	Yash Raj Films	
F E B	6	Vadh 2	Jaspal Singh Sandhu	Sanjay Mishra; Neena Gupta; Kumud Mishra; Amitt K Singh; Akshay Dogra; Shilpa Shukla; Yogita Bihani	Luv Films	
F E B	6	Bhabiji Ghar Par Hain! Fun on the Run	Shashank Bali	Aasif Sheikh; Shubhangi Atre; Rohitashv Gour; Vidisha Srivastava; Ravi Kishan; Mukesh Tiwari; Dinesh Lal Yadav; Brijendra Kala; Mushtaq Khan	Zee Studios, Edit II Productions, Zee Cinema	
F E B	6	Paro Pinaki Ki Kahani	Rudra Jadon	Eshita Singh; Sanjay Bishnoi; Hanuman Soni; Dhananjay Sardeshpande; Prernaa Mohod; Madan Deodhar; Sanjay Dhole; Hemant Kadam; Yogesh Sudhakar Kulkarni	Seraphity Studios, 363 Trees Production	
F E B	13	Tu Yaa Main	Bejoy Nambiar	Adarsh Gourav; Shanaya Kapoor; Parul Gulati	Colour Yellow Productions, Bhanushali Studios Limited	
F E B	13	O'Romeo	Vishal Bhardwaj	Shahid Kapoor; Nana Patekar; Triptii Dimri; Tamannaah Bhatia; Vikrant Massey; Avinash Tiwary; Disha Patani; Farida Jalal; Aruna Irani; Hussain Dalal; Rahul Deshpande	Nadiadwala Grandson Entertainment, VB Pictures	
F E B	20	Shatak: Sangh Ke 100 Varsh	Aashish Mall	Shivshailesh Korde; Govind Pandey; Yash Wakale; Saumya Daan; Jigna Bhardwaj; Sanjeev Tiwari; Harish Moily; Harshvardhan Sharma	ADA 360 Degree	
F E B	20	Assi	Anubhav Sinha	Taapsee Pannu; Kani Kusruti; Revathi; Manoj Pahwa; Kumud Mishra; Mohammed Zeeshan Ayyub; Naseeruddin Shah; Supriya Pathak; Seema Pahwa	T-Series Films, Benaras Media Works	
F E B	20	Do Deewane Seher Mein	Ravi Udyawar	Siddhant Chaturvedi; Mrunal Thakur; Ila Arun; Joy Sengupta; Ayesha Raza Mishra; Viraj Gehlani; Sandeepa Dhar; Deepraj Rana; Mona Ambegaonkar; Achint Kaur; Naveen Kaushik; Inesh Kotian	Zee Studios, Rancorp Media, Bhansali Productions, Ravi Udyawar Films	
F E B	20	Kennedy	Anurag Kashyap	Rahul Bhat; Sunny Leone; Mohit Takalkar; Abhilash Thapliyal; Megha Burman; Karishma Modi	Zee Studios, Good Bad Films, ZEE5	
F E B	27	The Kerala Story 2	Kamakhya Narayan Singh	Ulka Gupta; Aishwarya Ojha; Aditi Bhatia	Sunshine Pictures	
F E B	27	Accused	Anubhuti Kashyap	Konkona Sen Sharma; Pratibha Ranta	Dharmatic Entertainment, Netflix	
F E B	27	Nukkad Naatak	Tanmaya Shekhar	Molshri; Shivang Rajpal; Danish Husain; Nirmala Hazra	Kayaantaran Studios	
M A R	5	Subedaar	Suresh Triveni	Anil Kapoor; Radhika Madan; Saurabh Shukla; Aditya Rawal; Mona Singh; Faisal Malik	Anil Kapoor Film & Communication Network, Opening Image Films, Abundantia Entertainment, Amazon Prime Video	
M A R	6	Charak: Fair of Faith	Shieladitya Moulik	Anjali Patil; Subrata Dutta; Sahidur Rahaman; Shashi Bhushan; Nalneesh Neel; Koushik Kar; Sreya Bhattacharya; Sushmita Sur; Debdas Ghosh; Shankhadeep; Shounak Shyamal	Pen Studios, Sipping Tea Cinemas, Sudipto Sen Productions	
M A R	6	Na Jaane Kaun Aa Gaya	Vikas Arora	Jatin Sarna; Madhurima Roy; Pranay Pachauri	Dhawan Films, Vikas Arora Films	
M A R	6	Jab Khuli Kitaab	Saurabh Shukla	Pankaj Kapur; Dimple Kapadia; Aparshakti Khurana; Manasi Parekh; Samir Soni; Nauheed Cyrusi; Devyani Ratanpal	Applause Entertainment, Shoestrap Films, ZEE5	
M A R	13	Kissa Court Kachehari Ka	Rajnish Jaiswal	Rajesh Sharma; Brijendra Kala; Neelu Kohli; Lokesh Tilakdhari; Susheel Chandarbhan Parasha; Krishna Singh Bisht; Anju Jadhav; Sanjeev Jaiswal; Avanya Kumari	Lovely Films	
M A R	13	Ramyaa	Santosh Parab	Janmmejaya Singh; Samaira Rao; Sayaji Shinde; Ashok Samarth; Sheetal Pathak; Divyannk Patidar; Parthaa Akerkar; Ganesh Yadav; Pravin Manjarekar; Vishnou Dubey; Annapurna Vitthal; Anant Bhaan	Anandvan Creations, Sulbha KalaKruti Production	
M A R	19	Dhurandhar: The Revenge	Aditya Dhar	Ranveer Singh; Sanjay Dutt; Arjun Rampal; R. Madhavan; Sara Arjun; Rakesh Bedi	Jio Studios, B62 Studios	

== April–June ==
Opening		Title	Director	Cast	Studio (production house)	Ref.
A P R	10	Dacoit: A Love Story (Note: Shot simultaneously in Telugu and Hindi.)	Shaneil Deo	Adivi Sesh; Mrunal Thakur; Anurag Kashyap; Prakash Raj; Sunil; Atul Kulkarni; Zayn Marie Khan; Kamakshi Bhaskarla	Annapurna Studios, S. S. Creations, Suniel Narang Production	
A P R	10	Broken Harmony	Ashish Saxena	Sushant Saxena; Catherine Coker; Annie Sekhon; Arun Bali; Tina Ghai; Anup Jalota	Vega Films	
A P R	10	Candy and the Pizza Ggirl	Akhil Kapur	Ninad Kamat; Priya Banerjee; Shivani Singh; Dara Sandhu; Nimish Shitole; Aniket Sanghavi; Rahul Gupta	Elefante Blanco Pictures, India Film Factory, Full Moon Studioz, Amazon Prime Video	
A P R	10	Everybody Loves Sohrab Handa	Rajat Kapoor	Rajat Kapoor; Vinay Pathak; Koel Purie; Ranvir Shorey; Saurabh Shukla; Waluscha De Sousa; Sadiya Siddiqui; Chandrachoor Rai; Neil Bhoopalam; Palomi Ghosh; Sharat Katariya; M. K. Raina	Applause Entertainment, Mithya Talkies, ZEE5	
A P R	15	Toaster	Vivek Daschaudary	Rajkummar Rao; Sanya Malhotra; Archana Puran Singh; Abhishek Banerjee; Farah Khan; Upendra Limaye; Vinod Rawat; Jitendra Joshi; Seema Pahwa; Karmveer Choudhary; Dev Raaz	Kampa Films, Netflix	
A P R	17	Bhooth Bangla	Priyadarshan	Akshay Kumar; Paresh Rawal; Rajpal Yadav; Tabu; Wamiqa Gabbi; Jisshu Sengupta; Manoj Joshi; Mithila Palkar; Asrani; Rajesh Sharma	Balaji Motion Pictures, Cape of Good Films	
A P R	24	Ginny Wedss Sunny 2	Prasshant Jha	Avinash Tiwary; Medha Shankr; Lillete Dubey; Sudhir Pandey; Govind Namdev; Gopi Bhalla; Rohit Chaudhary; Nayani Dixit; Vishwanath Chatterjee	Zee Studios, Soundrya Production	
A P R	24	Mercy	Mitul Patel	Raj Vasudeva; Adil Hussain; Niharica Raizada; Aparna Ghoshal; Kunal Bhan; Azinkya Mishra; Sham Gandhi; Gauri Verma; Sarthak Joshi	Everclear Films	
M A Y	1	Raja Shivaji (Note: Shot simultaneously in Marathi and Hindi.)	Riteish Deshmukh	Riteish Deshmukh; Sanjay Dutt; Abhishek Bachchan; Vidya Balan; Mahesh Manjrekar; Sachin Khedekar; Bhagyashree; Fardeen Khan; Jitendra Joshi; Amole Gupte; Genelia D'Souza; Boman Irani; Kapil Honrao; Siddharth Shinde	Jio Studios, Mumbai Film Company	
M A Y	1	Ek Din	Sunil Pandey	Junaid Khan; Sai Pallavi; Kunal Kapoor; Kavin Dave; Pragati Mishra	Aamir Khan Productions	
M A Y	1	Pankh Hote To Udd Jate	Shiva Kumar Tripathi	Sudesh Berry; Shahbaz Khan; Avtar Gill; Gauri Shankar; Sonam Saini; Sania Singh; Tanuja Diwan; Vipin Singh; Armaan Tahil	ATS Square	
M A Y	7	Krishnavataram Part 1: The Heart (Hridayam)	Hardik Gajjar	Siddharth Gupta; Sushmitha Bhat; Sanskruti Jayana; Nivaashiyni Krishnan	Creativeland Studios Entertainment, Athashrikatha Motion Pictures	
M A Y	8	Main Actor Nahin Hoon	Aditya Kripalani	Nawazuddin Siddiqui; Chitrangada Satarupa; Naveen Kasturia; Ayushi Gupta; Yasir Iftikhar Khan; Meenakshi Arundhati; Vibhavari Deshpande	Mumba Devi Motion Pictures, Side Hero Entertainment	
M A Y	8	Daadi Ki Shaadi	Ashish R Mohan	Neetu Kapoor; Kapil Sharma; R. Sarathkumar; Sadia Khateeb; Riddhima Kapoor; Yograj Singh; Tejaswini Kolhapure; Deepak Dutta; Jitender Hooda; Aditi Mittal; Nikhat Khan; Vidhaan Sharma; Swarna Pandey; Ishan Chadha; Flora Jacob; Parveen Kaur; Ali; Rahul Singh	RTake Studios, BeingU Studios, Shimla Talkies	
M A Y	8	Dug Dug	Ritwik Pareek	Altaf Khan; Gaurav Soni; Yogendra Singh Parmar; Durga Lal Saini	Bottle Rocket Pictures	
M A Y	15	Pati Patni Aur Woh Do	Mudassar Aziz	Ayushmann Khurrana; Sara Ali Khan; Wamiqa Gabbi; Rakul Preet Singh; Vijay Raaz; Tigmanshu Dhulia; Vishal Vashishtha; Guneet Singh; Durgesh Kumar; Ayesha Raza Mishra; Shireesh Kumar Sharma; Deepika Amin	T-Series Films, B. R. Studios	
M A Y	15	Kartavya	Pulkit	Saif Ali Khan; Rasika Dugal; Sanjay Mishra; Saurabh Dwivedi; Zakir Hussain; Manish Chaudhari	Red Chillies Entertainment, Netflix	
M A Y	15	IIZ: Indian Institute of Zombies	Gaganjeet Singh; Alok Dwivedi	Mohan Kapur; Anupriya Goenka; Ranjan Raj; Sachin Kavetham; Jessy Lever; Rose Sardana; Shivani Paliwal; Tanishq Chaudhary; Shantanu Anam; Bidisha Ghosh Sharma; Ram Naresh Diwakar; Subhash Ahirwar; B. Shiva	Kuku, Low Gravity Productions	
M A Y	15	Aakhri Sawal	Abhijeet Mohan Warang	Sanjay Dutt; Amit Sadh; Namashi Chakraborty; Sameera Reddy; Tridha Choudhury; Nitu Chandra; Mrinal Kulkarni; Harsimran Oberoi; Rockey Raina; Archana Iyer; Bipin Nadkarni; Nikhil Nanda	Nikhil Nanda Motion Pictures, Neem Tree Entertainment	
M A Y	22	Chand Mera Dil	Vivek Soni	Lakshya; Ananya Panday	Dharma Productions	
M A Y	22	System	Ashwiny Iyer Tiwari	Sonakshi Sinha; Jyothika; Ashutosh Gowariker; Preeti Agarwal Mehta; Adinath Kothare; Aashriya Mishra; Gaurav Pandey; Sayandeep Sengupta	Baweja Studios, Amazon Prime Video	
M A Y	22	September 21 (Note: Shot simultaneously in Kannada and Hindi.)	Karen Kshiti Suvarna	Priyanka Upendra; Pravin Singh Sisodia; Zarina Wahab; Ajit Shidhaye; Amit Behl; Sachin Dilip Patekar; Ricky Rudra; Yuvin; Ankita Jayaram	Visica Films, FMD Productions, Humaramovie, FilmsMax	
M A Y	22	Teesri Begum	K. C. Bokadia	Kainaat Arora; Mugdha Godse; Rachna Shyam; Supriya Karnik; Zarina Wahab; Rana Jung Bahadur; Amit Gaur; Kevin Gandhi	BMB Productions	
M A Y	29	Rajni Ki Baraat	Aditya Aman	Ulka Gupta; Ashwath Bhatt; Sunita Rajwar; Zarina Wahab; Kanishk Vijay	Epiphany Entertainment	
M A Y	29	The Great Grand Superhero	Manish Saini	Jackie Shroff; Prateik Smita Patil; Bhagyashree; Sharat Saxena; Mihir Godbole; Durgesh Kumar; Sahaarsh Shuklaa; Shivansh Chorge; Kumar Saurabh	Zee Studios, Amdavad Films	
M A Y	29	Krishna Aur Chitthi	Vinay Bhardwaj; Saumitra Singh	Darsheel Safary; Arun Govil; Sajjad Delafrooz; Mir Sarwar; Faiz Khan; Vinay Bhardwaj	Shining Sun Studios	
M A Y	29	Jeena Dil Se	Adhish Rana	Lakshya Handa; Abhishek Singh; Yash Purohit; Tejender Singh; Kuunal Chhabra; Ruma Sharma; Shraddha Joshi; Deeksha Suryawanshi; Kiara Diwan; Shivani Wazir; Kanchan Singh; Mehak Jain; Muskaan Varshney; Priyanka Modgil; Kushagra Saxena; Umakant Choudhary	ADR Media Production	
M A Y	29	Obsess	Peter Wilson	Peter Wilson; Eisha Singh	Jagraj Motion Pictures, Peter Wilson Entertainment	
M A Y	29	Shree Baba Neeb Karori Maharaj	Sharadsingh Thakur	Subodh Bhave; Hiten Tejwani; Rajesh Sharma; Smita Tambe; Gauri Shankar; Milind Gunaji; Samikssha Batnagar; Mohit Gupta; Hemant Pandey; Aartii Naagpal; Varsha Manikchand Shrivastav; Hardeep Kaur; Aniruddh Dave; Garima Agarwal	Anisha Films International, PC Jeweller, BSR Film Productions, Advance Technology	
M A Y	29	Return of the Jungle	Vaibhav Kumaresh	Surendra Bhatia; Manish Bhawan; Arav Bhatia; Sourav Chakraborty	Vaibhav Studios	
J U N	4	Maa Behen	Suresh Triveni	Madhuri Dixit; Triptii Dimri; Dharna Durga; Ravi Kishan; Geetanjali Kulkarni; Arunoday Singh; Shardul Bharadwaj	Abundantia Entertainment, Opening Image Films, Netflix	
J U N	5	Bandar	Anurag Kashyap	Bobby Deol; Saba Azad; Sanya Malhotra; Raj B. Shetty; Jitendra Joshi; Sapna Pabbi; Indrajith Sukumaran; Riddhi Sen; Nagesh Bhonsle; Joju George; Santosh Juvekar; Ankush Gedam; Sukant Goel; Jaimini Pathak	Saffron Magicworks	
J U N	5	Hai Jawani Toh Ishq Hona Hai	David Dhawan	Varun Dhawan; Pooja Hegde; Mrunal Thakur; Jimmy Sheirgill; Maniesh Paul; Mouni Roy; Kubbra Sait; Chunky Panday; Ali Asgar	Tips Films, Maximilian Films	
J U N	12	Main Vaapas Aaunga	Imtiaz Ali	Diljit Dosanjh; Naseeruddin Shah; Sharvari; Vedang Raina	Applause Entertainment, Window Seat Films, Birla Studios	
J U N	12	Haunted 3D: Echoes of the Past	Vikram Bhatt; Manish P. Chavan	Mahaakshay Chakraborty; Chetna Pande; Shruti Prakash; Gaurav Bajpai; Praneet Bhat; Hemant Pandey	Anand Pandit Motion Pictures, Promoedge Media, Vsb Pictures	
J U N	12	Governor	Chinmay Mandlekar	Manoj Bajpayee; Adah Sharma; Noushad Mohamed Kunju; Madhoo; Paritosh Sand; Krisha Kurup; Jaywant Wadkar	Sunshine Pictures	
J U N	12	Bharat Bhhagya Viddhaata	Manoj Tapadia	Kangana Ranaut; Girija Oak; Smita Tambe; Prasad Oak; Amruta Namdev Patil; Esha Dey; Priya Berde; Asha Shelar; Suhita Thatte; Rasika Agashe	Pen Studios, Manikarnika Films, Paramhans Creations, Eunoia Films, Floating Rocks Entertainment	
J U N	12	The Narmada Story	Zaigham Imam	Ashwini Kalsekar; Simala Prasad; Anjali Patil; Zarina Wahab; Raghubir Yadav; Mukesh Tiwari	AB Infosoft Creation, Golden Ratio Films	
J U N	12	Heer Sara	Kartik Chaudhry	Patralekha; Maanvi Gagroo; Shweta Salve; Arif Zakaria; Nishank Verma; Bunty Chopra	Maghaa Creations, Next Level Productions, Opticus	
J U N	19	Cocktail 2	Homi Adajania	Shahid Kapoor; Kriti Sanon; Rashmika Mandanna	Maddock Films, Luv Films	
J U N	19	Samarpit: Father's Love	Exhan Khan	Annkit Yadavv; Jaya Bhattacharya	Naishaa Films	
J U N	19	Hum Angrezon Ke Zamane Ke Jailor Hai	Rakesh Sawant	Asrani; Zarina Wahab; Bhanwar Singh Pundir; Milind Gunaji; Vishnu Sharma; Rakesh Gupta; Abhinav Chauhan; Priya Choudhury; Muskan Verma; Mushtaq Khan	Jaya Films, Gajanan Motion Movies	
J U N	26	Welcome to the Jungle	Ahmed Khan	Akshay Kumar; Suniel Shetty; Jackie Shroff; Raveena Tandon; Disha Patani; Jacqueline Fernandez; Arshad Warsi; Paresh Rawal; Rajpal Yadav; Johnny Lever; Aftab Shivdasani; Lara Dutta; Shreyas Talpade; Tusshar Kapoor; Daler Mehndi; Farida Jalal; Krushna Abhishek; Kiku Sharda; Kiran Kumar; Mukesh Tiwari; Yashpal Sharma; Vindu Dara Singh; Urvashi Rautela; Puneet Issar; Firoz Khan; Pankaj Dheer; Sudesh Berry; Hemant Pandey; Zakir Hussain; Brijendra Kala; Jeetu Verma; Vrihi Kodvara; Bhagya Bhanushali; Adityaa Singgh	Star Studio18, Base Industries Group, Cape of Good Films, Seeta Films	
J U N	26	Navya Chakra - Psycon World	Amit Dixit	Jitendra Bohara; Tushar Kawale; Jessica Yadav; Kshitij Pawar; Pratiksha Singh; Sandhya Gemawat; Kailash Chaudhary; Sandeep Omkar	First Film Studios, Low Agers Production and Cine Arts	
J U N	26	Tera Mera Nata	Chanda Patel; Swatantra Goel	Dipika Chikhlia; Suraj Kumar; Ambika Vani; Pankaj Berry; Meghana Panchal; Pragya Mishra	Blue Diamond Production House, CP Production	

== July–September ==
Opening		Title	Director	Cast	Studio (production house)	Ref.
J U L	3	Baby Do Die Do	Nachiket Samant	Huma Qureshi; Sikandar Kher; Chunky Panday; Seema Pahwa; Rachit Singh; Vidya Malvade; Himanshu Malik; Marudhar Shekhawat; Arun Kushwah	Saleem Siblings, Pune-04 Picture	
J U L	3	Alpha	Shiv Rawail	Alia Bhatt; Sharvari; Bobby Deol; Anil Kapoor	Yash Raj Films	
J U L	3	Satluj	Honey Trehan	Diljit Dosanjh; Arjun Rampal; Suvinder Vicky; Kanwaljit Singh; Geetika Vidya Ohlyan	RSVP Movies, MacGuffin Pictures, ZEE5	
J U L	10	Dhamaal 4	Indra Kumar	Ajay Devgn; Riteish Deshmukh; Arshad Warsi; Sanjay Mishra; Jaaved Jaaferi; Esha Gupta; Sanjeeda Sheikh; Anjali Anand; Upendra Limaye; Vijay Patkar; Ravi Kishan	T-Series Films, Devgn Films, Maruti International, Panorama Studios	
J U L	10	Ikka	Siddharth P. Malhotra	Sunny Deol; Akshaye Khanna; Dia Mirza; Tillotama Shome; Sanjeeda Sheikh; Jyoti Mukherjee; Shishir Sharma; Akansha Ranjan Kapoor; Vijay Vikram Singh	Alchemy Films, Netflix	
J U L	17	Rahun Main Tere Rubaru	Inder Das	Aarya Kumar; Neetha Shetty; Peehu Biswas; Sandeep Bose; Nilofar Gesawat; Lokesh Kumar Aggarwal; Aman Tiwari; Abhishek Singh	S. S. Entertainment World	
J U L	24	The India Story	Chettan DK	Kajal Aggarwal; Shreyas Talpade; Trisha Sarda; Manish Wadhwa; Murali Sharma; Atul Tiwari; Kamlesh Sawant; Sham Mashalkar	Zee Studios, MIG Productions & Studios	
J U L	24	Uttar Da Puttar	Ravinder Siwach	Annu Kapoor; Rukhsar Rehman; Pavan Malhotra; Rajendra Sethi; Brijendra Kala; Sumit Gulati; Ishtiyak Khan; Jeeveshu Ahluwalia; Nitin Arora	Promodome Motion Pictures	
J U L	24	Tera Yaar Hoon Main	Milap Zaveri	Aman Indra Kumar; Akanksha Sharma; Paresh Rawal; Johnny Lever; Supriya Pilgaonkar; Mrinal Kulkarni; Neha Khan; Pooja Katurde; Anand Acharya; Darshan Jariwala	Camera Take Films, Mumbai Films, BIK Productions, Enterr10 Television	
J U L	24	Dulhaniya Le Aaeegi	Akashaditya Lama	Khushalii Kumar; Piyush Mishra; Mahesh Manjrekar; Omkar Kapoor; Snehil Dixit Mehra	Aleo Cine Sagas, Think Tank Global, Spira	
J U L	24	Indrajaal	Jageshhwar Lalita Dhoble	Mahesh Nikam; Shanaya Tripathi; Yashraj Dimbale; Kiran Mane; Kalpana Sarang; Darshana Rasal; Dheeraj Sharma; Satyam Chhetri; Rahul Kulkarni; Sanjana Deshmukh; Kalpesh Jagtap; Yogesh Dangat; Jeevan Wagh; Hemant Pawar; Shubham Chavan; Lakshmi Vibhute; Rahul Nikam; Pratiksha Sadakale; Deepak Deshmukh; Vajra Pawar; Malhar Gurav; Atharva Gade; Kirti Bodas; Ajim Patel; Omkar Raut; Namdeo Murkute; Vijay Ingale	Shivaratna Productions	
J U L	24	Max, Min & Meowzaki	Padmakumar Narasimhamurthy	Medha Shankr; Siddharth Menon; Vidhatri Bandi; Adil Hussain; Mandira Bedi; Nassar; Nafisa Ali; Gitanjali Rao	SSO Productions	
J U L	30	Bhai Tera Star Hai	Vivek Agrawal	Raghav Juyal; Sanjay Kapoor; Niharika NM; Barkha Singh; Vikalp Mehta; Vivan Bhatena; Niki Aneja Walia; Parvathy Omanakuttan; Chandan Roy Sanyal; Tina Desai; Vineeth Beep Kumar; Naser Al Azzeh; Dev Agrawal	Eastwood Pictures, Indian Stories 2	
J U L	30	The Bose Files: Sach Ya Sazish	Rajesh Gupta	Yatin Karyekar; Veerendra Saxena; Akhilendra Mishra; Apoorva Arora; Amit Behl; Rajiv Kumar; Akashdeep Arora; Rajesh Gupta	Real Reels	
J U L	31	Dil Deewana Ho Gaya	Rajiv Shyamlal Soni	Kajal Chauhan; Bhanuj Sood; Shubhkaran Bhopal; Brij Gopal; Raju Kher; Mehul Buch; Mushtaq Khan; Garima Agarwal; Arun Bakshi; Anjali Gupta; Divya Dwivedi	Grandway Productions	
A U G	7	Aryabhatt Ka Zero	Kamal Chandra	Himansh Kohli; Sonnalli Seygall; Ravi Kishan; Shilpa Shinde; Neeraj Sood; Alka Amin; Rajesh Sharma; Gopal Datt; Ishlin Prasad; Darshana Banik; Naresh Vohra; Peeyush Suhaney; Kunal Kuldeep; Shailja Sharma; Gaurav Wadhwa; Zooby Singh	Newtech Media Entertainment, Radhika G Films, Sunil Sihag Gora Films, A2R Films	
A U G	7	Ohh My Dog	Amit Rai	Pankaj Tripathi; Pavan Malhotra; Maahi Rai; Rajesh Kumar; Geeta Agarwal Sharma; Vijay Mishra; Shreedhar Dubey; Bulloo Kumar; Sulakhyana Baruah	Babulal Biscope, Thinking Hats Entertainment Solutions	
A U G	7	Hanuman Ansh	Vishal Chaturvedi	Shobhinav Satya; Vihaan Shedge; Chandan K Anand; Purnima Tiwari; Anil Rastogi; Gulshan Pandey; Bhagwan Das Patel; Rajiv Mishra; Mukteshwara Ojha; Alex Danilov; Natali Pichaslava; Gautam Tripathi; Surendra Kumar	SWAMbhu Media Network, Holy Cow Home Productions	
A U G	13	Jumper	Saurabh Varma	Tanuj Virwani; Khanak Budhiraja; Vijay Raaz; Zakir Hussain; Brijendra Kala; Rajesh Jais; Zarina Wahab; Kettan Singh; Gaurav Shivaji	Kenilworth Films, JioHotstar	
A U G	14	Awarapan 2	Nitin Kakkar	Emraan Hashmi; Disha Patani; Shabana Azmi; Suvinder Vicky; Vijayant Kohli; Atul Kumar; Aniruddh Rawal; Puran Gabbi	Vishesh Films	
A U G	14	Batwara 1947	Rajkumar Santoshi	Sunny Deol; Preity Zinta; Karan Deol; Shabana Azmi; Ali Fazal; Abhimanyu Singh; Khushi Hajare; Kanikka Kapur	Aamir Khan Productions	
A U G	21	Harrd Disk	Udoyrraj Baruah	Jai Hind Kumar; Nanda Yadav; Arnav Chandel; Rahul Arora; Siddhartha Mukherjee; Chhabi Guragai	Common Enterrtainment, Nayamigro Media, Xanthin	
A U G	21	Dial 1975	Navneet Behal; Vibhu Kashyap	Kay Kay Menon; Kirti Kulhari; Pravessh Rana	Spherecho Productions, Waves OTT	
A U G	28	Babita Singh Reporting	Ambiecka Pandit	Barun Sobti; Nimisha Sajayan; Anshumaan Pushkar	Film Squad Productions, Act Three, Amazon Prime Video	
S E P	3	Gandhari	Devashish Makhija	Taapsee Pannu; Ishwak Singh; Swastika Mukherjee; Mita Vashisht; Jatin Sarna; Chhaya Kadam; Chandan Roy	Kathha Pictures, Netflix	
S E P	4	Mirzapur: The Movie	Gurmmeet Singh	Pankaj Tripathi; Ali Fazal; Divyenndu; Jitendra Kumar; Ravi Kishan; Abhishek Banerjee; Rasika Dugal; Shweta Tripathi; Shriya Pilgaonkar; Harshita Gaur; Sushant Singh; Mohit Malik; Sheeba Chaddha; Rajesh Tailang; Kulbhushan Kharbanda; Shaji Choudhary; Sonal Chauhan; Pramod Pathak; Anangsha Biswas; Satendra Soni	Amazon MGM Studios, Excel Entertainment	
S E P	4	Jeevan Ya Bheema Con?	Abhishek Dogra	Arshad Warsi; Sanjeeda Sheikh; Vijay Raaz; Pooja Chopra; Brijendra Kala; Madhu Anand Chandhock; Atul Parchure; Jaywant Wadkar; Dimple Srivastava	Starbeam Ventures	
S E P	4	Mahaprabhu Jagannath (Note: Produced in Odia, Hindi and Telugu languages.)	Shripad Warkhedkar	Prachi Save Saathi; Sonal Kaushal; Aditya Raj Sharma	Ele Animations	
S E P	5	Cocaine	Shravan Tiwari	Abhimanyu Singh; Ashok Samarth; Nissar Khan; Uday Tikekar; Mushtaq Khan	Jahn Studio, Amelie Films, JioHotstar	
S E P	11	Haiwaan	Priyadarshan	Akshay Kumar; Saif Ali Khan; Shriya Pilgaonkar; Saiyami Kher; Boman Irani; Sharib Hashmi; Rajpal Yadav; Rajesh Sharma; Manoj Joshi; Pahal Chaudhary	KVN Productions, Thespian Films	
S E P	11	Ghamasaan	Tigmanshu Dhulia	Arshad Warsi; Pratik Gandhi; Ishita Dutta; Rajpal Yadav	Jio Studios, Yaelstar Films, Golden Ratio Films, ZEE5	
S E P	11	Last Man in Tower	Ben Rekhi	Manoj Bajpayee; Boman Irani; Divya Dutta; Sukant Goel; Harish Khanna; Chandan Roy Sanyal; Ujjwal Chopra; Swaroopa Ghosh; Uday Chandra; Madhuri Bhatia; Shrikant Yadav; Salim Siddiqui; Tanisha Mehta	Spirit Media	
S E P	18	Vibe	Kunal Khemu	Kunal Khemu; Preity Zinta; Sparsh Shrivastava; Vanshika Dhir; Yashpal Sharma; Dinesh Lal Yadav; Salem Guermat	Amazon MGM Studios, Drongo Films	
S E P	18	Daayra	Meghna Gulzar	Kareena Kapoor; Prithviraj Sukumaran	Pen Studios, Junglee Pictures	
S E P	18	Bharat Desh Hai Mera	Adarsh Jain	Anup Jalota; Ramakant Singh; KK Goswami; Qayoom Badshah; Raj Dubey; Raj Chouhan; Amit Lekhwani; Gunjan Pant; Archana Singh; Latif Shaikh; Shahid Shams; Rohit Singh Matru; Tanuj Pathak; Madhvi Shri; Divya Yadav; Shilpi Chugh; Siddhant Jain; Ravikant Yadav; Apurva Pandey	Adarsh Jain Films	
S E P	18	Om Ka Hari	Harish Vyas	Anshuman Jha; Raghubir Yadav; Soni Razdan; Samta Sudiksha; Ayesha Kapur; Shivani Tanksale	First Ray Films	
S E P	18	Lust Stories 3	Vikramaditya Motwane; Kiran Rao; Shakun Batra; Vishal Bhardwaj	Radhika Apte; Konkona Sen Sharma; Aditi Rao Hydari; Radhika Madan; Sana Thampi; Vijay Varma; Abhishek Banerjee; Siddharth; Ali Fazal; Gurfateh Pirzada	RSVP Movies, Flying Unicorn Entertainment, Netflix	
S E P	18	Khoonta	Anushi Sharma	Anushi Sharma; Ishan Azad; Ashu Ghanshyam; Jawahar Kaul; Karrtik Rao; Shubham Sethi; Uday Sharma; Pooja Waghmare; Prerna Thakur; Varunkant; Rishan Verma; Manuj Walia	Indie Films	
S E P	25	The Vvaan: Force of the Forrest	Deepak Kumar Mishra	Sidharth Malhotra; Tamannaah Bhatia; Maniesh Paul; Sunil Grover; Shweta Tiwari; Anup Soni	Balaji Motion Pictures, TVF Motion Pictures, 11:11 Productions	
S E P	25	Mahakavya Shri Ramayan Katha: Shri Ram Ki	Abhishek Singh	Dev Sharma; Anjali Arora; Sheel Verma; Rajneesh Duggal; Nirbhay Wadhwa	AJ Film Entertainment World, Mahobiya Films	
S E P	25	Don't Be Shy	Sreeti Mukerji	Aarushi Bajaj; Ansh Duggal; Bianca Arora; Piyush Khati; Kunaal Roy Kapur; Anurag Basu; Neha Dhupia; Anju Alva Naik	Eternal Sunshine Productions, Chalkboard Entertainment, Amazon Prime Video	
S E P	25	Oye Chill Maar	Nitin Rokade	Tejas Dev; Shrey Pareek; Prachi Bansal; Shikha Pandey; Atul Tiwari; Sujeet Asthana; Prashant Mohite; Meenu Sharma; Sufiya Tanveer; Nidhi Uttam; Rahul Rajput	Tulshiram Production House	
S E P	25	Love Lottery	Arvind Pandey	Akshay Oberoi; Heli Daruwala; Kabir Duhan Singh; Hemant Pandey; Indira Krishnan; Vijayant Kohli; Santosh Shukla; Vikram Sharma; Agni Agyari; Kumar Saurabh; Arshdeep Ssandhu; Ashwannt Lodhi	Cinema Ganj Films	
S E P	28	Bombay Stories	Rahhat Shah Kazmi	Mouni Roy; Anupriya Goenka; Sushmita Singh; Tani Deol; Shoib Nikash Shah; Rrahul Sudhir; Fezan Khan; Monica Aggarwal; Gargi Duggal	Rahat Kazmi Films, Effortless Studios, Tariq Khan Productions, Gargi Productions, JioHotstar	

== October–December ==
Opening		Title	Director	Cast	Studio (production house)	Ref.
O C T	2	Drishyam: The Conclusion	Abhishek Pathak	Ajay Devgn; Tabu; Shriya Saran; Jaideep Ahlawat; Ishita Dutta; Mrunal Jadhav; Rajat Kapoor; Prakash Raj; Kamlesh Sawant	Star Studio18, Panorama Studios	
O C T	2	Prem Keetanu	Apoorv Singh Karki	Veer Pahariya; Aafiya Sayed; Aparshakti Khurana; Rakesh Bedi; Nikhil Vijay	Avanika Films, Phars Film, Bhavana Studios	
O C T	2	Pooja Meri Jaan	Navjot Gulati	Huma Qureshi; Mrunal Thakur; Vikram Singh Chauhan; Vijay Raaz	Maddock Films, ZEE5	
O C T	9	Reporting Live	Dhruv Tripathi	Parineeti Chopra; Deven Bhojani; Shekhar Suman; Adil Hussain; Amol Palekar; Nassar; Saswata Chatterjee; Samir Kochhar; Geeta Agarwal Sharma; Prachee Shah Paandya; Pitobash Tripathy	Old Monk Entertainment, Netflix	
O C T	16	Prahaar: The Untold Story of Ujjwal Nikam	Avinash Arun	Rajkummar Rao; Wamiqa Gabbi; Sikandar Kher; Jaideep Ahlawat; Nassar; Ashish Vidyarthi; Lalit Prabhakar; Ritvik Sahore	Maddock Films	
O C T	16	Nayyi Navelli	Balaji Mohan	Yami Gautam; Adinath Kothare; Anurag Thakur; Sunita Rajwar; Mita Vashisht; Aaditya Kulshreshth; Sushmita Mukherjee; Sonal Jha; Suneel Sinha; Prateek Pachauri; Akshat Singh; Babita Pandey; Ajay Pal; Neeraj Singh; Aan Tiwari	Amazon MGM Studios, Colour Yellow Productions	
O C T	23	Little Thomas	Kaushal Oza	Gulshan Devaiah; Rasika Dugal; Hridansh Parekh; Hridansh Gokani; Ninadh Pandit; Mahabanoo Mody-Kotwal; Aarush Sarda; Aseem Hattangady; Preeti Sharma; Faezeh Jalali; Sanjay Gurbaxani; Uday Chandra; Cyli Khare	Luminoso Pictures, Civic Studios, Good Bad Films, Flip Films	
O C T	23	Pehla Pyaar Doosri Baar	Anuj Saini	Alisha Chopra; Sparsh Walia; Sakshi Vaidya; Kunal Vaid; Sargun Kaur Luthra; Thushar Chhibber	Luv Films	
O C T	23	Darsha	Roshan Dupare	Akshay Khadse; Munna Gaharwal; Vikrant Satyanarayan Sharma; Sanjay Mate; Samrudhi Atish Dupare; Sanskriti Aadbane; Chandan Awazade	Aabhas Studios	
O C T	23	Tum Mere Ho	Ashish Panda	Gurmeet Choudhary; Isha Malviya; Shaan R Grover; Anushka Luhar; Nikhat Khan; Manik Bedi; Shalini Kapoor; Romanch Mehta; Adhik Mehta; Shreas Pardiwala; Vikas Verma; Saumya Uniyal; Anisha Garg; Khabir Mehta; Vidhaan Sharma	Reva Creative House, DebGuru Films	
O C T	23	Tu Hai Meri Kiran	Karan Rawal	Sonakshi Sinha; Zaheer Iqbal; Ankit Gupta; Sherlin Seth; Zarina Wahab; Purnendu Bhattacharya	Echelon Productions, PAM Studios, AND Productions	
O C T	23	Udta Teer	Aakash Kaushik	Ayushmann Khurrana; Sara Ali Khan; Ram Kapoor; Rahul Bose; Suhail Nayyar; Gulshan Grover; Mukul Dev; Raghubir Yadav; Brijendra Kala; Sandeep Anand; Supriya Pilgaonkar; Smita Tambe	Dharma Productions, Sikhya Entertainment	
O C T	23	Doosra	Abhinay Deo	Plabita Borthakur; Ankur Vikal; Samidha Guru; Tvisha Joshi; Krishna Gokani	RDP Production	
O C T	23	Sumo Didi	Jayant Rohatgi	Shriyam Bhagnani; Chaitnya Sharma; Anubha Fatehpuria; Nitesh Pandey; Raghav Dhir; Meenal Kapoor	Jio Studios, Fresh Lime Films, MA+TH Entertainment Network, ZEE5	
O C T	23	Gajab Raat	Ritesh Shah	Manoj Bajpayee; Nushrratt Bharuccha; Divya Dutta; Saqib Saleem; Akshay Oberoi; Shraddha Das; Kiku Sharda; Aditi Sandhya Sharma; Rajiv Gupta	Friday Storytellers, Netflix	
O C T	23	Lohitaksha	Bhupindarra	Siddhant Issar; Apsara Rani; Kamlesh Sawant; Sukumar Tudu; Bobby Mishra; Dipesh Samantaray; Santu Nije; Shakti Baral	Gana Vikas Films	
O C T	30	Nakhrewaalii	Rahul Shanklya	Ansh Duggal; Pragati Srivastava; Akash Makhija; Aayushi Verma; Kumud Mishra; Gopal Datt; Kanupriya Pandit	Jio Studios, Colour Yellow Productions	
O C T	30	Pyre	Vinod Kapri	Padam Singh Kapri; Heera Devi; Subhash Chandra; Shubham Chaudhary; Sadab Khan; Alok Verma; Gopa Nayal; Deewan Kanwal; Jaya Shah; Pushpa Pandey	Bhagirathi Films, Mashakbeen Studios	
O C T	30	Meethe Mein Kya Hai	Radhika Bansal	Ritwik Bhowmik; Rohini Hattangadi; Ayesha Raza Mishra; Gaurav K. Sharma; Kanikka Kapur; Ayuushman Ghai; Tarana Raja; Dalai; Abhay Kaul; Vikram Bakshi; Shivika Rishi	Utthan Capital, Netflix	
O C T	30	Love Story Abhimanyu Ki	Ankit Bhadana	Pragati Tiwari; Vishal Mohan; Ankit Bhadana; Suvinder Vicky; Mansi Rawat; Deepak Kapoor	Om Thakuraani Production	
O C T	30	Jhaad Phoonk	Rajan Verma	Padmini Kolhapure; Yashpal Sharma; Sumbul Touqeer; Harsh Rajput; Apratim Singh	Niiv Entertainment India, JioHotstar	
N O V	5	Ramayana: Part 1	Nitesh Tiwari	Ranbir Kapoor; Yash; Sai Pallavi; Ravi Dubey; Sunny Deol; Arun Govil; Lara Dutta; Sheeba Chaddha; Anupam Kher; Rakul Preet Singh	Prime Focus Studios, Monster Mind Creations, DNEG	
N O V	5	Dilwali Diwali	Ritesh Menon	Mihir Ahuja; Manoj Pahwa; Neelu Kohli; Aurra Bhatnagar Badoni	Terribly Tiny Tales, Netflix	
N O V	11	Blind Game	Sangeeth Sivan	Arjun Rampal; Priyamani; Rohit Chandel; Akash Makhija; Devenn Patel	Zee Studios, Soham Rockstar Entertainment, ThunderSky Entertainment, ZEE5	
N O V	13	Parivarik ManuRanjan	Varun V. Sharma	Pankaj Tripathi; Aditi Rao Hydari; Brijendra Kala	AAZ Films, Bhanushali Studios Limited, SonyLIV	
N O V	20	Pratap	Sachin Saraf	Amit Sadh; Esha Deol; Tigmanshu Dhulia; Milind Gunaji; Seema Biswas; Dushyant Wagh; Sushmita Singh; Pranathi Damodar	UV Films	
N O V	20	Kaali Kheti	Haris Imtiyaz Khan	Jackie Shroff; Sharad Kelkar; Neha Sargam; Veerendra Saxena; Shaji Choudhary; Spandan Sameer Javalagi	BlackCanvas Studio, Zeroland Production	
N O V	20	Party Animals	Ravi Chhabriya	Viraj Ghelani; Arjun Tanwar; Pragati Nagpal; Jaanyaa Joshi; Naqiyah Haji; Soundous Moufakir; Simona J; Anil Charanjeett; Alam Khan; Saqib Ayub; Vijay Patkar; Kamlesh Sawant; Moses Koul; Aaron Arjun Koul; Rohan Khurana; Suresh Menon; Brijendra Kala; Pradeep Kabra; Aryan Prajapati; Visshesh Tiwari; Anang Desai; Chhaya Vora; Manoj Joshi; Samir Soni	Yoodlee Films	
N O V	20	Nanhey Dil	Swaroop Raj Medara	Suniel Shetty	Srinathji's Hospitality & Ninefold Pictures, Navaras Entertainment	
N O V	20	Heat City: Antarpath – Chapter One	Chirag M Trivedi	Chirag M Trivedi; Muni Jha; Piyush Patil; Priyank Pandav; Vihaan Choudhary; Jalak Motiwala; Taj Sethi; Gaurav Shivaji; Asif Ali; Abhishek Yaduvanshi; Pravesh Singh; Kishore Soni; Ajay Yadav	Shiv Yug Films	
N O V	25	Delhi 2021	Abhishek Acharya	Richa Chadha; Sumeet Vyas; Gulshan Grover	Zee Studios, ZEE5	
N O V	27	Yeh Prem Mol Liya	Sooraj Barjatya	Ayushmann Khurrana; Sharvari; Anupam Kher; Seema Pahwa; Supriya Pathak; Swanand Kirkire; Geeta Agarwal Sharma; Saumya Tandon; Surbhi Tiwari; Shruti Seth; Shaad Randhawa; Rajesh Kumar; Girish Kulkarni; Jameel Khan; Krish Rao; Ashnoor Kaur Kuckreja	Rajshri Productions, Mahaveer Jain Films	
N O V	27	Gunmaaster G9	Aditya Datt	Emraan Hashmi; Genelia D'Souza; Aparshakti Khurana; Abhishek Singh; Avneet Kaur; Snehil Dixit Mehra; Inayat Verma	Soham Rockstar Entertainment, SRE Studios	
N O V	27	Ghar No. 666	Abhay Thaakuur	Maaya Sivaa; Leena Nandi; Nikhil Gamare; Shrawani Mahind; Pritam Rathod; Aditya Alankar; Suvahhdan Angre	Waltz Frame, Deep Seea Moviiess	
N O V	27	Laagi Chhoote Na	Anand Kumar Tiwari	Ashutosh Kumar; Deepra Mishra; Shalu Singh	Anand Motion Pictures	
N O V	27	Chindi Pakad	Prasenjit Chakraborty	Chittrali Das; Debranjan Nag; Rajkumar Dwivedi; Manoj Karotia	Shristi Creation Film Productions	
D E C	4	Eetha	Laxman Utekar	Shraddha Kapoor; Randeep Hooda; Mohammed Zeeshan Ayyub; Siddharth Jadhav; Ishtiyak Khan; Anant Joshi	Maddock Films, Kathputli Creations	
D E C	4	3 Monkeys	Abbas–Mustan	Arjun Rampal; Vishal Jethwa; Mustafa Burmawala; Priya Prakash Varrier; Tenzing Dalha	AJ Film Entertainment World, AV Picture	
D E C	4	Bokshi	Bhargav Saikia	Prasanna Bisht; Mansi Multani; Shernaz Patel; Rohit Tiwari; Siddharth Shaw; Swaroopa Ghosh	Lorien Motion Pictures	
D E C	4	Cousin Isha	Vikrant Rai	Vikrant Rai; Surbhi Talodiya; Riya Kapoor; Sourav Pratap Tomar; Naresh Gosain; Anjuman Saxena; Prateek Pachauri	Vikrant Rai Films	
D E C	4	Maatrubhumi: May War Rest in Peace	Apoorva Lakhia	Salman Khan; Chitrangada Singh; Anoop Bikram Shahi; Zeyn Shaw; Abhishree Sen; Jason Tham; Ankur Bhatia; Harshil Shah; Heera Sohal; Vipin Bhardwaj; Tanya Desai; Azai Ahluwalia; Ivarr Ahluwalia	Salman Khan Films	
D E C	4	Devi Vigyanam	Kartavya Shah	Chetan Dhanani; K. Aryavardhan; Puja Joshi; Tiku Talsania; Mehul Buch; Allok Thakkar; Kurush Deboo; Nilesh Bhatt; Vishal Vaishya; Rachana Pakai	King Production House	
D E C	4	Dalimb	Priya Aven	Jitendra Kumar; Priya Bapat	Ellipsis Entertainment, ZEE5	
D E C	11	Ganesh Dust to Stardust	Ganesh Acharya	Shivanshu Soni; Aalok Shaw; Sukanya Kalan; Sakshi Pawaskar; Jaywant Wadkar; Vidya Joshi; Neeshanth Sathiyanarayanan; Disha Pandya; Rudransh Pawar; Anjali Nair; Sanchi Daudkar; Ananya Vikrant Tekawade; Dinesh Hebbar; Anita Sridharan; Harshvardhan; Rudransh Chondekar; Guru Divekar; Abhishek Thakur; Omm Dubey; Parth Tiwari; Vishnu Deva; Madhuri Pawar; Suchismita Sharma; Gauri Sukhtankar	V2S Production & Entertainment	
D E C	11	Main Na Raha Mera	Amit Kasaria	Adhyayan Suman; Divita Rai	Sangani Brothers Motion Pictures	
D E C	11	Mr. and Mrs. Grey	Ankur Pajni; Vishal Mishra	Vivek Oberoi; Nithya Menen; Ashish Vidyarthi; Shreya Sharma	Waveband Production	
D E C	11	NH 99	Amar Raj Chauhan	Akash Kapoor; Aavya Gupta; Ghara Ram; Vinod Suryavanshi; Nishi Yaduvanshi; Jeniffer Piccinato; Akshay Kharodia; Heena Harwani	Neelam World Pictures	
D E C	11	Pyaade	Shekhar S. Jha	Jimmy Sheirgill; Adhyayan Suman; Pranutan Bahl; Aanchal Verma; Gyanendra Tripathi; Gulshan Pandey; Sanjeev Tyagi; Govind Pandey; Naseer Abdullah; Manish Mishra; Aadiip Sharma	Shining Moon Pictures	
D E C	24	King	Siddharth Anand	Shah Rukh Khan; Suhana Khan; Deepika Padukone; Abhishek Bachchan; Anil Kapoor; Jackie Shroff; Arshad Warsi; Rani Mukerji; Raghav Juyal; Abhay Verma; Saurabh Shukla; Jaideep Ahlawat; Akshay Oberoi; Karanvir Malhotra	Red Chillies Entertainment, Marflix Pictures	

== See also ==
- Lists of Hindi films
- List of Hindi films of 2025
- List of Hindi films of 2027
