= List of Indian films of 2027 =

Indian Films
- Previous: List of Indian films of 2026; Next: List of Indian films of 2028

== Lists of Indian films of 2027 ==
- List of Hindi films of 2027
- List of Malayalam films of 2027
- List of Telugu films of 2027

== See also ==
- List of Indian films of 2026

Preceded by 2026	Indian films 2027	Succeeded by 2028
