= Talvar (soundtrack) =

- Soundtrack cover

Soundtrack album by Vishal Bhardwaj
- Released: 16 September 2015
- Recorded: 2015
- Studio: Satya Studio, Mumbai; The Pierce Room, London; Abbey Road Studios, London
- Genre: Feature film soundtrack
- Length: 15:57
- Language: Hindi
- Label: T-Series
- Producer: Ketan Sodha; Tushar Parte

Vishal Bhardwaj chronology
Drishyam (2015)	Talvar (2015)	Madaari (2016)

Talvar is the soundtrack album to the 2015 film of the same name directed by Meghna Gulzar. The film's soundtrack is composed by Vishal Bhardwaj which consisted of four songs written by Gulzar and was released under the T-Series label on 16 September 2015. Gulzar received a Filmfare Award for Best Lyricist nomination for the song "Zinda".

== Development ==
Vishal Bhardwaj, besides screenwriting and producing the film under his Vishal Bhardwaj Pictures banner, also composed the film's music due to its intense and emotional subject of a true incident. Ketan Sodha was involved in composing the score. Bhardwaj's norm collaborator and lyricist Gulzar penned four songs for the soundtrack with vocals by Arooj Aftab, Rekha Bhardwaj, Sukhwinder Singh and Arijit Singh. The album was released under the T-Series label on 16 September 2015.

== Critical reception ==
The album received generally positive reviews. Mohar Basu of The Times of India wrote, "With Gulzar saab's work at the pen joining Vishal's formidable sense of melody, Talvar's album [has] a heady quality". Joginder Tuteja of Bollywood Hungama said that the film "has a situational soundtrack which has a couple of heartfelt numbers connecting one to the film's theme", praising "Insaaf" for its "uniqueness quotient" and the "haunting appeal". Ruchi Kaushal wrote that "Zinda Hai" "painfully highlights the agony of the parents who have lost their daughter in a twin murder case, for which they themselves are accused." Vipin Nair of The Indian Express described it as "a soundtrack from the masterly pair of Vishal Bhardwaj and Gulzar that scores high with its pensive melodies." Karthik Srinivasan of Milliblog summarized it as: "2 out of 4 again for Vishal, like Drishyam."

Critic Aseem Chhabra, in his review for Rediff.com, stated that "Talvar's music is composed by Bhardwaj adding to the dark texture of the film. And as a package deal we also get to hear Rekha Bhardwaj's rich melodious voice singing the film's closing song Zinda." Saibal Chatterjee of NDTV stated that "Several songs (lyrics: Gulzar; music: Bhardwaj) are employed to underpin the Talvar narrative, but the film has no room for any happy musicality." Shreekant Sambrani of Business Standard wrote "Appropriate mood music, Bhardwaj’s forte, is an unobtrusive but vital contributor to this."

== Track listing ==
Talvar (Original Motion Picture Soundtrack) track listing
No.	Title	Singer(s)	Length
1.	"Insaaf"	Arooj Aftab	3:20
2.	"Patli Gali"	Sukhwinder Singh	3:33
3.	"Shaam Ke Saaye"	Arijit Singh	4:42
4.	"Zinda"	Rekha Bhardwaj	4:22
Total length:			15:57

== Credits and personnel ==
Credits adapted from T-Series.

- Music composer: Vishal Bhardwaj
- Lyrics: Gulzar
- Singers: Arooj Aftab, Rekha Bhardwaj, Sukhwinder Singh, Arijit Singh
- Music producers: Ketan Sodha, Tushar Parte
- Choir: Deepti Rege, Mayuri Patwardhan, Archana Gore, Pragati Joshi, Marianne D'Cruz, Neisha Mascarenhas, Mimosa Pinto, Samantha Pacheco
- Choir arrangement: Rajiv Sundaresan
- Electric and acoustic guitar: Mayukh Sarkar
- Nylon guitar: Tushar Parte
- Shehnai: Omkar Dhumal
- Sarangi: Sabir Khan
- Dholak: Hafeez Ahmad, Girish Vishwa, Raju Sardar, Shreedharan Chari
- Tabla: Musharraf Khan, Sanjiv Sen
- Flute: Paras Nath
- Percussion: Deepak Borkar
- Recording: Salman Khan Afridi (Satya Studio, Mumbai)
- Mixing: Steve Fitzmaurice (The Pierce Room, London), Salman Khan Afridi (Satya Studio, Mumbai)
- Assistant mixing: Darren Hellis, Naren Kapoor
- Mastering: Christian Wright (Abbey Road Studios, London)

== Accolades ==
Accolades for Talvar (Original Motion Picture Soundtrack)
Award	Date of ceremony (Note: Date is linked to the article about the awards held that year, wherever possible.)	Category	Recipients	Result	Ref.
Filmfare Awards	16 January 2016	Best Lyricist	Gulzar ("Zinda")	Nominated	
Global Indian Music Academy Awards	6 April 2016	Best Lyricist	Gulzar ("Zinda")	Nominated	
Producers Guild Film Awards	22 December 2015	Best Female Playback Singer	Rekha Bhardwaj ("Zinda")	Nominated	
