= List of Indian films of 2026 =

Indian Films
- Previous: List of Indian films of 2025; Next: List of Indian films of 2027

This is a list of the highest grossing Indian films release in 2026.

== Box office collection ==
Background shading indicates that a film is currently showing in theatres worldwide.

The following is the list of highest-grossing Indian films released in 2026. The rank of the films in the following table depends on the estimate of worldwide gross collections as reported by reliable sources and producer reports. There is no official tracking of domestic box office figures within India.

Highest grossing Indian films of 2026
Rank	Title	Language	Worldwide gross	Ref.
1	Dhurandhar: The Revenge	Hindi	₹1,852.44 crore	
2	Ramayana: Part 1	Hindi	₹1,547.15 crore	
3	Jailer 2	Tamil	₹835 crore	
4	Drishyam: The Conclusion	Hindi	₹576.69 crore	
5	Border 2	Hindi	₹464.50 crore	
6	Hanuman Ansh	Hindi	₹442.58 crore	
7	Bethlehem Kudumba Unit	Malayalam	₹331.09 crore	
8	Peddi	Telugu	₹330–336.85 crore	(Note: Peddi's reported worldwide grosses vary between ₹330 crore (Deccan Herald, Cinema Express) – ₹336.85 crore (Outlook India))
9	Mirzapur: The Movie	Hindi	₹325.02 crore	
10	Toxic	Kannada; English	₹320–341.39 crore	

== Lists of Indian films of 2026 ==
- List of Bengali films of 2026
- List of Gujarati films of 2026
- List of Hindi films of 2026
- List of Kannada films of 2026
- List of Malayalam films of 2026
- List of Marathi films of 2026
- List of Odia films of 2026
- List of Tamil films of 2026
- List of Telugu films of 2026

== See also ==
- List of Indian films of 2025
- List of 2026 box office number-one films in India

== Notes ==
Preceded by 2025	Indian films 2026	Succeeded by 2027
