= Chiraiya =

2026 Indian web series

- Promotional poster
- Genre: Drama
- Created by: Divy Nidhi Sharma
- Based on: Sampurna
- Showrunner: Divy Nidhi Sharma
- Written by: Divy Nidhi Sharma
- Story by: Soumyabrata Rakshit
- Directed by: Shashant Shah
- Starring: Divya Dutta; Sanjay Mishra; Siddharth Shaw; Prasanna Bisht
- Composer: Raja Narayan Deb
- Country of origin: India
- Original language: Hindi
- No. of seasons: 1
- No. of episodes: 6

Production
- Executive producer: Rajesh Sharma
- Producers: Shrikant Mohta; Mahendra Soni
- Cinematography: Subhankar Bhar
- Editor: Aseem Sinha
- Running time: 26–39 minutes
- Production company: SVF Entertainment

Original release
- Network: JioHotstar
- Release: 20 March 2026

Chiraiya (transl. "Bird") is a 2026 Indian Hindi-language drama web series directed by Shashant Shah and produced by SVF Entertainment. It stars Divya Dutta, Sanjay Mishra, Siddharth Shaw and Prasanna Bisht. It is an adaptation of the Bengali web series Sampurna.

The series began streaming on JioHotstar from 20 March 2026 and has become one of the most popular Hindi series on the platform in recent months.

== Premise ==
A young bride navigates a suffocating marriage, battling for autonomy in a society that values family honour over her consent. The show confronts marital rape, exposing the myth of implied consent within marriage and highlighting her emotional and psychological struggle for dignity.

== Cast ==
- Divya Dutta as Kamlesh
- Sanjay Mishra as Sukumar Bhramar
- Prasanna Bisht as Pooja Kumari
- Siddharth Shaw as Arun Kumar
- Faisal Rashid as Vinay Kumar; Kamlesh’s husband
- Tinnu Anand as Nana; Kamlesh's grandad
- Sarita Joshi
- Anjum Saxena

== Episodes ==
No.	Title	Directed by	Written by	Original release date
1	"Griha Pravesh"	Shashant Shah	Divy Nidhi Sharma	20 March 2026
2	"Pag Phera"	Shashant Shah	Divy Nidhi Sharma	20 March 2026
3	"Honeymoon"	Shashant Shah	Divy Nidhi Sharma	20 March 2026
4	"Muh Dikhai"	Shashant Shah	Divy Nidhi Sharma	20 March 2026
5	"Vidaai"	Shashant Shah	Divy Nidhi Sharma	20 March 2026
6	"Kathaa"	Shashant Shah	Divy Nidhi Sharma	20 March 2026

== Soundtrack ==
All tracks are written by Divy Nidhi Sharma.

Track-List
No.	Title	Singer(s)	Length
1.	"Udi Chiraiya"	Sunetra Banerjee	2:24
2.	"Dhoop Jaye Dever"	Amrita Bharati	2:42
3.	"Suhaagan Bhookhi Pyaasi Re"	Zeenia Roy	1:28

== Release ==
Chiraiya was released on JioHotstar on 20 March 2026.

== Reception ==
=== Critical reception ===
Archika Khurana of The Times of India gave 3.5 stars and wrote "At its core, the series tackles the sensitive and rarely explored subject of marital rape, challenging the deeply ingrained belief that marriage implies automatic consent. But rather than turning into a loud, didactic social commentary, Chiraiya chooses a more introspective route. It does not point fingers; it holds up a mirror."

Shubhra Gupta of The Indian Express gave 3.5 stars and worded "The series adopts a degree of melodrama which belongs more to the Ekta Kapoor brand of kitchen-sink saas-bahu serials than a modern series that challenges patriarchy through personal choices which are held up for what they are."

Shreyas Pande of The Hindu reviewed the series and highlighted "Through its accessible storytelling, the show offers a sharp portrayal of patriarchy and its impact on families, even though the presentation lacks finesse, making it clunky in some portions."

Rahul Desai of The Hollywood Reporter India writes that "Not the gender empowerment story we deserve" and describe it as "A liberal mind undone by a conservative body".

Vinamra Mathur of Firstpost rated it 3.5 stars and said that "In most of the Hindi movies that we have seen, the wedding room represents intimacy, to celebrate what we call Suhaagrat. In Chiraiya, it’s depicted as a room for horror and loneliness. And it has been done well."

Udita Jhunjhunwala writing for Scroll.in observed that "Chiraiya is saying something that matters, but it leans so heavily on its message that it begins to feel less like a story and more like a lesson."

Sana Farzeen of India Today gave 3.5 stars and writes that "It does not claim to have all the answers. Instead, it leaves you with questions – difficult, uncomfortable, necessary questions. Because sometimes, the first step towards change is not action, but acknowledgement. And in a society that still struggles to even name the problem, that in itself is a powerful beginning."

BH Harsh of Cinema Express rated it 3.5 stars and said that "Chiraiya tells us to be cautious of those animals who thrive in broad society under the endearing allure of poetry."

Arpita Sarkar of OTT Play gave 3 stars out of 5 and said that "Chiraiya is a socially important series that highlights issues such as marital abuse, consent, and patriarchal norms."
