= List of Hindi films of 2028 =

List of Hindi-language films released in 2028

This is a list of Hindi language films produced in Bollywood in India that are scheduled to be released in the year 2028.

== January–March ==
| Opening | | Title | Director | Cast | Studio (production house) | Ref. |
|---|---|---|---|---|---|---|
J A N
F E B
| M A R | 31 | Untitled film | Abhay Pannu | Varun Dhawan | Yash Raj Films | |

== April–June ==
| Opening | | Title | Director | Cast | Studio (production house) | Ref. |
|---|---|---|---|---|---|---|
A P R
| M A Y | 5 | Kaaliya | Sandeep Modi | Kartik Aaryan | Dharma Productions, Dopamine Studios | |
J U N

== July–September ==
| Opening | Title | Director | Cast | Studio (production house) | Ref. |
|---|---|---|---|---|---|
J U L
A U G
S E P

== October–December ==
| Opening | | Title | Director | Cast | Studio (production house) | Ref. |
|---|---|---|---|---|---|---|
| O C T | 13 | Ramayana: Part 2 | Nitesh Tiwari | Ranbir Kapoor; Yash; Sai Pallavi; Ravi Dubey; Sunny Deol; Arun Govil; Lara Dutta; Sheeba Chaddha; Anupam Kher; Rakul Preet Singh | Prime Focus Studios, Monster Mind Creations, DNEG | |
N O V
D E C

== See also ==
- Lists of Hindi films
- List of Hindi films of 2027
