= IIZ: Indian Institute of Zombies =

2026 Indian Hindi-language zombie comedy film

- Directed by: Gaganjeet Singh; Alok Dwivedi
- Written by: Hussain Dalal; Abbas Dalal
- Produced by: Kunj Sanghvi
- Starring: Mohan Kapur; Anupriya Goenka; Ranjan Raj; Jesse Lever; Rose Sardana
- Production companies: Kuku; Low Gravity Productions
- Release date: 15 May 2026
- Running time: 137 minutes
- Country: India
- Language: Hindi

IIZ: Indian Institute of Zombies is a 2026 Indian Hindi-language zombie comedy film directed by Gaganjeet Singh and Alok Dwivedi. The film stars Mohan Kapur, Anupriya Goenka, Ranjan Raj, Jesse Lever, Rose Sardana, Sachin Kavetham, Shivani Paliwal and Tanishq Chaudhary. The screenplay was written by Hussain Dalal and Abbas Dalal.

== Plot ==
Set in an elite engineering institute, the film follows a group of students attempting to survive a sudden zombie outbreak while dealing with academic pressure, competition and campus life.

== Cast ==
- Mohan Kapur
- Anupriya Goenka
- Ranjan Raj
- Jesse Lever
- Rose Sardana
- Sachin Kavetham
- Shivani Paliwal
- Tanishq Chaudhary
- Shantanu Anam

== Production ==
The film was produced by Kuku as its first theatrical feature film. Development reportedly incorporated artificial intelligence tools during various stages of production.

== Marketing ==
The teaser was released in April 2026.

The official trailer was released ahead of the film's theatrical release.

== Release ==
The film was released theatrically in India on 15 May 2026.

== Reception ==
The film received a rating of 1.5/5 from The Times of India, with criticism directed at its execution despite an interesting premise.
