= Bokshi =

2025 Indian film

- Official release poster
- Directed by: Bhargav Saikia
- Written by: Harsh Vaibhav
- Produced by: Bhargav Saikia
- Starring: Prasanna Bisht; Mansi Multani; Shernaz Patel; Siddharth Shaw; Swaroopa Ghosh
- Cinematography: Siddharth Sivasankaran; A. Vasanth
- Edited by: Himanshu Saikia
- Music by: Advait Nemlekar
- Production company: Lorien Motion Pictures
- Release dates: January 2025 (IFFR); 4 December 2026
- Running time: 166 minutes (IFFR); 143 minutes (India)
- Country: India
- Languages: Hindi; English; Nepali; Boksirit

Bokshi is a 2025 Indian folk horror film directed and produced by Bhargav Saikia and written Harsh Vaibhav. It stars Prasanna Bisht, Mansi Multani, Shernaz Patel, Siddharth Shaw and Swaroopa Ghosh.

The film premiered on several film festivals around the world.The film was originally scheduled to be released theatrically on 9 October 2026. It was postponed due to a CBFC review and is now scheduled to be released on 4 December 2026.

== Synopsis ==
Haunted by the traumatic disappearance of her mother, Anahita finds solace in her history teacher, Shalini. But when an unconventional school excursion takes them to a mysterious prehistoric site, Anahita is forced to confront a terrifying destiny that has been waiting for her.

== Cast ==
- Prasanna Bisht as Anahita
- Mansi Multani as Shalini
- Shernaz Patel as Bokshi(voice)
- Siddharth Shaw as Rishav
- Swaroopa Ghosh as Kadambari
- Sandeep Dhabale as Avinash
- Rohit Tiwari as Lalit
- Kaushik Bharadwaj as Akash
- Dagi Ngomdir as Rebecca
- Himbarsha Das as Lopa
- Biru Tamang as Lakhpa
- Avishek Lama as Imay

== Production ==
Bokshi marks the feature-film directorial debut of Assamese filmmaker Bhargav Saikia; the film was shot in the dense forests of Sikkim, with the remote landscape playing an important role in establishing its folk-horror atmosphere. The film is multilingual, featuring Hindi, English and Nepali, alongside Boksirit—a fictional language specially created for the film by Dutch linguist Jan van Steenbergen.

== Release ==
Bokshi premiered at 54th International Film Festival Rotterdam (IFFR). Bokshi will release in the theatre on 4 December 2026.
