= Drishyam (2015 film) =

2015 Indian film by Nishikant Kamat

- Theatrical release poster
- Directed by: Nishikant Kamat
- Written by: Upendra Sidhaye
- Story by: Jeethu Joseph
- Based on: Drishyam by Jeethu Joseph
- Produced by: Kumar Mangat Pathak; Abhishek Pathak; Ajit Andhare
- Starring: Ajay Devgn; Tabu; Shriya Saran; Ishita Dutta; Mrunal Jadhav; Rajat Kapoor
- Cinematography: Avinash Arun
- Edited by: Aarif Sheikh
- Music by: Songs: Vishal Bhardwaj; Score: Sameer Phaterpekar
- Production companies: Panorama Studios; Viacom18 Motion Pictures
- Distributed by: Panorama Studios; Viacom18 Motion Pictures
- Release date: 31 July 2015
- Running time: 163 minutes
- Country: India
- Language: Hindi
- Budget: ₹35 crore
- Box office: est. ₹135.92 crore

Drishyam (transl. Visual) is a 2015 Indian Hindi-language crime thriller film directed by Nishikant Kamat and produced by Viacom 18 Motion Pictures and Panorama Studios. A remake of the eponymous 2013 Malayalam film of the same name, the film stars Ajay Devgn, Tabu, Shriya Saran. Ishita Dutta, Mrunal Jadhav, Rajat Kapoor, Kamlesh Sawant, and Rishab Chadha.

The film was released on 31 July 2015, and in China in 2022. Upon release, it was a critical and commercial success. A sequel titled Drishyam 2 was released in 2022.

== Plot ==
Vijay Salgaonkar is an orphan who dropped out of school at the fourth grade. He is now a businessman running a cable TV service in Goa, the Mirage Cable Company. He is married to Nandini and has two daughters: Anju, his adopted elder daughter and Anu, his youngest daughter. His only interest, apart from his family, is watching films. He has often helped people with ideas he learned from films.

During a school camp, a nude video of Anju gets recorded by another student, Sameer "Sam" Deshmukh, who is the son of the Inspector-general of police Meera Deshmukh. Sam uses the video to blackmail Anju for sexual favors. That night, he turns up at her house, but Nandini who is also present, pleads with him to delete the video and leave Anju alone. He agrees on the condition that Nandini sleep with him. Anju while trying to knock the phone with the video out of Sam's hand, strikes his head accidentally with a rod, killing him. Her main aim was to break the phone, not Sam. Anju and Nandini bury Sam's dead body in a compost pit, and this act is witnessed by Anu.

The next morning, arriving home, Vijay is informed of the incident by Nandini and quickly devises a scheme to save his family from the police. He constructs an elaborate coverup for the murder and creates an airtight alibi for the family by taking a trip to Panaji for a religious sermon Nandini had previously requested to attend. However, he returns for the same trip a week later and reinforces their earlier visit - with just the dates changed so the witnesses will corroborate their presence on the day of the murder. He removes Sam's broken phone and disposes of his car in a lake, which is seen by Sub-inspector Laxmikant Gaitonde, who holds a grudge against Vijay.

Meera, realizing that her son has gone missing, starts an investigation. She begins to suspect Vijay and his family and they are called in for questioning. Having predicted that this would happen, Vijay coaches his family on how to explain their alibis to the police. When questioned individually, the family stick to their alibis. Meera questions the owners of the establishments that Vijay had met during his trip. Their statements prove Vijay's alibi. A CCTV camera footage of Vijay being at a bank ATM in Panaji on Sunday, October 3, proves Vijay's alibi and as an evidence. Meera deduces that Vijay had gotten acquainted with the owners, and manipulated them into lying.

Meera arrests the family and Gaitonde uses force to try to extract the truth out of them. Meera learns about the video that Sam made about Anju from Sam's friend Alex. When Gaitonde threatens to hit Anu, she discloses the truth out of fear. Anu reveals the place where Sam is buried. The police dig up the compost pit where Sam is buried, only to find the remains of a dog. The crowd gathers at the scene, and Vijay tells them that Gaitonde had hit Anu. Gaitonde attempts to attack Vijay, but is stopped by an angry mob who thrash him.

Following the incident, Gaitonde is suspended and Meera resigns. Meera and her husband, Mahesh, summon Vijay and ask for his forgiveness over Sam's perverted behavior. They also reveal that they are going to live with Meera's brother in London. They ask Vijay to disclose the truth behind their son's disappearance, to which Vijay hints about killing him. He reveals that he would go to any lengths to protect his family and asks them for forgiveness.

In the present, Vijay is called to sign a register at the new police station. As he walks out of the station, flashbacks are shown of Vijay walking out of an unfinished police station (the new police station that was being constructed at the time of Sam's death), implying that he buried Sam's body beneath the police station while it was being constructed.

== Cast ==
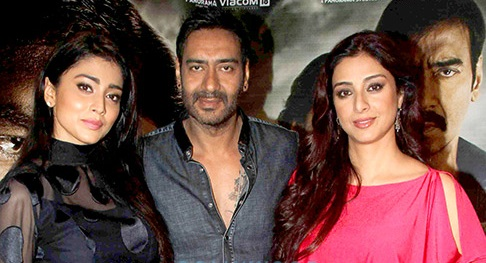
Saran, Devgn and Tabu promoting the film in July 2015

- Ajay Devgn as Vijay Salgaonkar, a cable TV operator
- Tabu as IG Meera Deshmukh IPS, Sam's mother
- Shriya Saran as Nandini Salgaonkar, Vijay's wife; Anju and Anu's mother
- Ishita Dutta as Anju Salgaonkar, Vijay and Nandini's adoptive elder daughter
- Mrunal Jadhav as Anu Salgaonkar, Vijay and Nandini's younger daughter
- Rajat Kapoor as Mahesh Deshmukh, Meera's husband and Sam's father
- Kamlesh Sawant as Sub Inspector Laxmikant Gaitonde
- Rishab Chadha as Sameer "Sam" Deshmukh, Meera and Mahesh's son
- Prasanna Ketkar as Senior Inspector Shrikant Prabhu
- Yogesh Soman as Inspector Vinayak Sawant
- Prathamesh Parab as Jose, Vijay's assistant
- Sharad Bhutadiya as Martin, a restaurant owner
- Samar Parshuram as Contractor Rane
- Himanshu Joshi as Rajesh, Rani's brother
- Ashish Warang as the new Senior Inspector
- Vikas Kumar as Alex, Sam's friend
- Anil Rasal as Peter

== Production ==
=== Casting ===
In November 2014, it was announced that Ajay Devgn would star in the Hindi remake of the 2013 film Drishyam, produced by Viacom 18 Motion Pictures in association with Panorama Studios and directed by Nishikant Kamat. Tabu was cast to play the role played by Asha Sharath from the original while Shriya Saran was cast as Devgn's wife.

=== Filming ===
Principal photography was scheduled to commence in February 2015. Devgn had been in Canada to shoot snow scenes for his film Shivaay, but light snow conditions had him reschedule that film and return to India to instead begin Drishyam. The first schedule began on 13 March 2015 in Goa and concluded on 1 April 2015. The second schedule began in April 2015. The first look of the film was unveiled on 29 May 2015.

=== Legal issues ===
On the announcement of the Hindi remake, producer Ekta Kapoor sent a legal notice to the Malayalam filmmakers. Ekta Kapoor acquired the movie rights of Japanese author Keigo Higashino's book, The Devotion of Suspect X, and her legal team claimed that Drishyam is a film adaptation of the novel, for which they purchased rights. However, the original Drishyam director and screenwriter Jeethu Joseph, denied that his film is an adaptation or copy of the Japanese novel and film. Commentator Nandini Ramnath noted how the denial of even slight inspiration by the Japanese novel is parallel to the inside movie storyline as "Jeethu Joseph's achievement lies in lifting an intelligent concept and localizing it so effectively that the links (to the Japanese novel) appear tenuous unless closely investigated. Drishyam is the perfect crime about a perfect crime, and its director's alibi is almost as airtight as the one Ishigami creates for Yasuko and Misato."

Drishyam was declared tax free in Uttar Pradesh.

== Soundtrack ==
The soundtrack was composed by Vishal Bhardwaj, with lyrics written by Gulzar. A song titled "Carbon Copy", which was sung by Ash King, was released on 7 July 2015. Zee Music Company acquired the music rights. The soundtrack album was released on 17 July 2015.

Drishyam

Soundtrack album by Vishal Bhardwaj
- Released: July 17, 2015
- Genre: Feature film soundtrack
- Length: 16:28
- Language: Hindi
- Label: Zee Music Company
- Producer: Ketan Sodha

Vishal Bhardwaj chronology
Haider (2014)	Drishyam (2015)	Talvar (2015)

Official audio
- Drishyam - Full Album on YouTube

All tracks are written by Gulzar.

No.	Title	Singer(s)	Length
1.	"Carbon Copy"	Ash King	03:34
2.	"Dum Ghutta Hai"	Rahat Fateh Ali Khan, Rekha Bhardwaj	04:30
3.	"Kab Kahan Se"	KK	03:58
4.	"Kya Pataa"	Arijit Singh	04:14
Total length:			16:16

== Reception ==
=== Critical reception ===
Drishyam received positive reviews from critics. On the review aggregator website Rotten Tomatoes, 78% of 18 critics' reviews are positive, with an average rating of 6.5/10.

Subhash .K. Jha gave four and a half out of five stars and stated "Nishikant Kamat's Drishyam is an outright winner. It is a remarkably resonant remake and a unique stand-alone experience." Suchitra Bajpai Chaudhary of Gulf News gave it four and a half out of five stars and stated "There are no loose ends in the plot; every character, every situation is well planned and visualised to perfection. The background score is evocative though a song highlighting the trauma of the characters seemed eminently forgettable." Martin D'Souza of Glamsham gave it four out of five stars and stated "Drishyam is a spot-on crime thriller that has some 'heart-in-your-mouth' moments. It's set up in a made-up village called Pondolim in North Goa. What's satisfying about the entire screenplay is that what Vijay is doing on screen is what you will do for your family. Nothing less; after all, family is all that we have!" Meena Iyer of The Times of India gave the film four out of five stars, describing it as "A suspense drama with a nail-biting finish." Iyer criticized the casting choices for some of the Salgaonkar family, but praised Devgn and Tabu's performances, "Ajay, who is the prey here, shines in his role of the protective father ... Tabu [is] outstanding as his predator."

Bollywood Hungama gave the film four out of five stars "There is no single moment in the film suffers a lag ... As for the taut screenplay (Upendra Sidhye), it keeps on playing with your mind all the time. You know what happened but even then you are taken for a ride and start believing in it." Rohit Vats of Hindustan Times rated the film three and a half out of five stars, describing it as "Stunning, gripping, edge-of-the-seat, shocking, engrossing". Vats praised the film for being successful as a suspense thriller. The Free Press Journal (FPJ Bureau) said, "The climax is just awesome and worth watching and waiting for. Performance-wise, Ajay is very good, as is Tabu. Shriya and the daughters have also acted brilliantly and did justice to their characters. The film's direction and screenplay are very good, while the music is okay. I would say, the movie is must watch."

The Indian Express, however, gave the remake two and a half out of five stars and found fault with the chemistry between Devgn and Shriya Saran, who plays his character's wife. Indian Express described Devgan's performance as "stilted" and Tabu's performance as "off-and-on", commenting that she sometimes comes off as stiff. Raja Sen of Rediff gave the film a rating of two and a half out of five stars, noting the pace of the film begins "far too snoozily". Sen described Tabu's character as Inspector General Nair as a "badass superstar", but overall felt "the film is clumsily written, with dialogue that sounds wooden.

=== Box office ===
By the end of its fifth week, the film grossed around ₹757 million (US$7.9 million). It attained a total gross of ₹91.97 crore (US$9.6 million) (India) in the Indian box office by the end of its run. Worldwide, the film collected ₹155 million (US$1.6 million) in seven weeks and reached a combined worldwide total gross of ₹1.1 billion (US$11 million).

In 2022, film was released in China earning US$30,000 on its opening and $4.05 million in its lifetime, making the film's final worldwide gross ₹1.47 billion.

== Sequel ==
Following the success of the original Malayalam film Drishyam 2, Panorama Studios acquired the remake rights for the film in May 2021, which was titled the same. It released on 18 November 2022, with Ajay Devgn, Tabu, Shriya Saran, Ishita Dutta, Mrunal Jadhav and Rajat Kapoor, reprising their roles alongside Akshaye Khanna. A third and final installment in the series, titled Drishyam: The Conclusion was theatrically released on 2 October 2026.
