= Kaafiron Ki Namaaz =

2016 film directed by Ram Ramesh Sharma

- Directed by: Ram Ramesh Sharma
- Written by: Ram Ramesh Sharma
- Produced by: Bhargav Saikia
- Starring: Alok Chaturvedi; Chandrahas Tiwari; Megh Pant
- Cinematography: A. Vasanth
- Edited by: Joydip Mukhopadhyay
- Music by: Advaith Namlekar
- Release date: 7 April 2016
- Running time: 149 minutes
- Country: India
- Languages: Hindi; Kashmiri

Kaafiron Ki Namaaz (transl. Prayer of non-believers) is a 2016 Hindi-language drama film written and directed by Ram Ramesh Sharma. The film won four awards including the Best Feature Film at the third Ladakh International Film Festival.

Unable to get censor clearance for a theatrical release, the film was released on YouTube on 7 April 2016.
