= Wild Wild Punjab =

Indian comedy film

- Official release date
- Directed by: Simarpreet Singh
- Written by: Harman Wadala; Sandeep Jain
- Story by: Luv Ranjan
- Produced by: Ankur Garg; Luv Ranjan
- Starring: Varun Sharma; Jassie Gill; Sunny Singh; Manjot Singh
- Cinematography: Nigam Bomzan
- Edited by: Chetan M. Solanki
- Music by: Songs: Guru Randhawa; Luv Ranjan; Bali; Saurabh-Vaibhav; Score: Hitesh Sonik
- Production companies: T-Series Films; Luv Films
- Distributed by: Netflix
- Release date: 10 July 2024
- Running time: 111 minutes
- Country: India
- Language: Hindi

Wild Wild Punjab is a 2024 Indian Hindi-language comedy film directed by Simarpreet Singh. Produced by T-Series Films and Luv Films, the film stars Varun Sharma, Jassie Gill, Sunny Singh, Manjot Singh, Patralekha and Ishita Raj Sharma. It was released on Netflix on 10 July 2024 to mixed reviews from critics and audiences.

== Plot ==
Gaurav Jain, pressured by his domineering father into an arranged marriage for dowry, sets out with his friends Maan Arora and Rajesh Khanna. Khanna is heartbroken after discovering his girlfriend Vaishali cheated on him and plans to confront her at her wedding in Pathankot. Their mentor Honey Singh joins them on the trip.

On the way, the group crashes a wedding to find alcohol and gets heavily drunk. The next morning, they discover Gaurav accidentally married the bride, Radha, after publicly refusing dowry when the original groom backed out. The villagers celebrate him as a hero, leaving Gaurav trapped. Unable to abandon Radha, the group takes her along.

Radha learns about Khanna’s situation and suggests he confront Vaishali while pretending to have a girlfriend. They approach Meera, who agrees only if they help her deliver drugs. This leads to clashes with gangsters, a police arrest, a jailbreak, and a gun chase in which Khanna is injured.

The gangsters later kidnap Radha, demanding Meera in exchange. The group rescues her, and the chaos leads them to Vaishali’s wedding venue. There, Vaishali learns her fiancé also cheated on her, reconciles with Khanna, and is confronted publicly as planned. The police arrive and arrest the gangsters.

== Cast ==
- Varun Sharma as Rajesh Khanna
- Sunny Singh as Maan Arora
- Manjot Singh as Honey Singh
- Jassie Gill as Gaurav Jain
- Rajkummar Rao as Narrator
- Patralekha as Radha
- Ishita Raj Sharma as Meera
- Rajesh Sharma as SHO Avtar Singh, Rupnagar
- Asheema Vardaan as Vaishali
- Subha Rajput as Tara
- Gopal Datt as Gaurav's father
- Samuel John as Daljeet
- Anjum Batra as Dalbir
- Rose Sardana as Ginni
- Ashok Pathak as Doctor
- Harsimran oberoi as channo
- pritam Jaiswal
- Rashid*

== Production ==
The film was announced in February 2024. The teaser of the movie released on 29 February 2024.

== Music ==
Wild Wild Punjab

Soundtrack album by Guru Randhawa, Luv Ranjan, Bali and Saurabh-Vaibhav
- Released: 8 July 2024
- Recorded: 2023–2024
- Genre: Feature film soundtrack
- Length: 11:25
- Language: Hindi
- Label: T-Series

The soundtrack is composed by Guru Randhawa, Luv Ranjan, Bali and Saurabh-Vaibhav while the background score is done by Hitesh Sonik. Lyrics are written by Guru Randhawa, Happy Bains, Luv Ranjan, Bali, Harsh Tyagi and Saurabh-Vaibhav.

Track listing
No.	Title	Lyrics	Music	Singer(s)	Length
1.	"Husn Irani"	Guru Randhawa, Happy Bains	Guru Randhawa	Guru Randhawa	2:59
2.	"I Am Over You"	Luv Ranjan	Luv Ranjan	Amit Gupta	3:33
3.	"Meri Baggi Mera Ghoda"	Bali	Bali	Bali	3:12
4.	"Suttebaaz Haseena"	Harsh Tyagi, Saurabh-Vaibhav	Saurabh-Vaibhav	Mika Singh	3:01
Total length:					11:25

== Reception ==
Wild Wild Punjab received mixed reviews from critics and audiences. On the review aggregator website Rotten Tomatoes, 31% of 13 critics' reviews are positive, with an average rating of 4.5/10.

Shubhra Gupta of The Indian Express gave the film 1.5/5 stars, writing, "This Fukrey lite is a load of jaded tiresomeness; Punjab deserves better." Vineeta Kumar of India Today awarded the film 2/5 stars, writing, "The bigger problem is not how the film treats its women, but how it doesn't see any man as a grown-up. It is funny in parts if you have the appetite for those kinds of jokes, but at best, it looks like a dull celebration of empty-headed men." Deepa Gahlot of Rediff.com rated the film 2.5/5 stars. Shilajit Mitra for The Hindu wrote, "Wild Wild Punjab runs low on horsepower and horseplay. Simarpreet, a debutant director, struggles to choreograph the levels of comedic chaos he clearly aspires to."

Monika Rawal Kukreja from Hindustan Times gave a positive review, writing, "Wild Wild Punjab, staying true to its title and genre, has several moments that are outright hilarious and you don't even feel like questing the whys and hows."
