= A. Vasanth =

Indian cinematographer A.V. Vasanthakumar

A. Vasanth Kumar
- Born: Chennai, Tamil Nadu
- Occupation: Cinematographer

A. Vasanth Kumar is an Indian cinematographer from Chennai, Tamil Nadu, India. He graduated from the M.G.R. Government Film and Television Training Institute, commonly known as Adyar Film Institute, in Chennai.

== Filmography ==
| Movie | Year | Language | Notes |
|---|---|---|---|
| 2013 | Akaash Vani | Hindi | Segment Cinematography |
| 2013 | Kaafiron Ki Namaaz | Hindi; Kashmiri; English | |
| 2014 | Nee Jathaga Nenundali | Telugu | |
| 2015 | Indru Netru Naalai | Tamil | |
| 2016 | Savitri | Telugu | |
| 2019 | Game Over | Tamil; Telugu | |
| 2020 | Indoo Ki Jawani | Hindi | |
| 2022 | Like, Share & Subscribe | Telugu | |
| 2022 | Meet Cute | Telugu | |
| 2022 | 18 Pages | Telugu | |
| 2025 | Bokshi | Hindi | |
| 2025 | Udaipur Files | Hindi | |
