= Lohitaksha =

2026 Hindi-language psychological thriller film

- Directed by: Pupindarr S Riar
- Screenplay by: Pupindarr S Riar & Nishant Majithia
- Story by: Deepali Debasmita Dash
- Produced by: Pupindarr S Riar
- Starring: Siddhant Issar; Apsara Rani; Kamlesh Sawant; Sukumar Tudu; Bobby Mishra; Nishant Majithia
- Cinematography: Sarada Krishna Sahu
- Edited by: Manas Kumar Sahu
- Music by: Abhijit Majumdar; Abhijit Tripathy; Nabs and Saroj
- Production company: Gana Vikas Films
- Distributed by: Prakash Films
- Release date: 23 October 2026
- Running time: 133 minutes
- Country: India
- Language: Hindi

Lohitaksha is a 2026 Indian Hindi-language psychological thriller film produced and directed by Pupindarr S Riar. The screenplay of the story by Deepali Debasmita Dash is crafted by Pupindarr and Nishant Majithia with the dialogues written by Nishant. The film stars Siddhant Issar, Apsara Rani, Kamlesh Sawant, Sukumar Tudu, Bobby Mishra and Nishant Majithia.

== Plot ==
The film features interconnected storylines involving a troubled marriage, an auto-rickshaw driver caught in a dangerous situation and a police investigation. Its narrative deals with psychological conflict, abusive relationships, murder and revenge.

== Cast ==
- Siddhant Issar
- Apsara Rani
- Kamlesh Sawant
- Sukumar Tudu
- Bobby Mishra
- Santu Nijee
- Sakti Baral

== Production ==
Lohitaksha was written, produced and directed by Pupindarr S Riar. The film was produced under the Gana Vikas Films banner and filmed in Odisha, including locations in Cuttack. This film is the Bollywood debut of actress Apsara Rani.

== Music ==
The film's music credits include Abhijit Majumdar, Abhijit Tripathy, Nabs and Saroj. Sarada Krishna Sahu served as cinematographer, while Manas Kumar Sahu was responsible for editing.

== Release ==
Lohitaksha was released theatrically in India on 23 October 2026. The film is in Hindi and has a listed runtime of 133 minutes.
