= Jeena Dil Se =

2026 Indian musical comedy film

- Directed by: Adhish Rana
- Produced by: Adhiraj Rana; Adhish Rana; Amardeep Rana
- Starring: Ruma Sharma; Lakshya Handa; Yash Purohit; Abhishek Singh Rajput; Shraddha Joshi
- Cinematography: Karan Balerao
- Production company: ADR Media Production
- Release date: 29 May 2026
- Country: India
- Language: Hindi

Jeena Dil Se is a 2026 Indian Hindi-language musical comedy film directed by Adhish Rana and produced by Adhiraj Rana, Adhish Rana and Amardeep Rana under the banner ADR Media Production.

== Cast ==
- Ruma Sharma
- Lakshya Handa
- Yash Purohit
- Abhishek Singh Rajput
- Shraddha Joshi
- Kanchan Singh Bhuwal

== Production ==
The film was produced by ADR Media Production. Principal photography was carried out in Haryana.

== Music ==
The soundtrack includes songs performed by Shreya Ghoshal, Armaan Malik, Javed Ali, Nakash Aziz and Asees Kaur.

== Release ==
The film was released theatrically on 29 May 2026.

== Reception ==
A reviewer for Bhaskar Hindi wrote that the film reflects the emotions, aspirations and relationships of contemporary youth, praising its focus on friendship, romance and personal growth. Chirag Sehgal of News18 gave the film a positive review, describing it as a light-hearted entertainer with a fresh cast and feel-good moments. He praised its youthful energy, music and positive messaging while noting its appeal to family audiences. Writing for Film Information, Komal Nahta gave the film a mixed review, stating that although it contained entertaining moments and was aimed at younger viewers, its narrative and commercial prospects were limited.
