= Love Story Abhimanyu Ki =

2026 Indian Hindi-language romantic drama film

- Directed by: Ankit Bhadana
- Written by: Sandeep Tomar
- Produced by: Sandeep Tomar
- Starring: Pragati Tiwari; Vishal Mohan; Ankit Bhadana; Suvinder Vicky; Mansi Rawat; Deepak Kapoor
- Cinematography: Shekhar Shinde
- Edited by: Kiran Rajendra Madre; Praveen Bishnoi
- Music by: Rohit Sardhana
- Production company: Om Thakuraani Production
- Release date: 30 October 2026
- Running time: 122 minutes
- Country: India
- Language: Hindi

Love Story Abhimanyu Ki is a 2026 Indian Hindi-language romantic drama film directed by Ankit Bhadana and produced by Sandeep Tomar under the banner of Om Thakuraani Production. The film stars Pragati Tiwari, Vishal Mohan and Ankit Bhadana, alongside Suvinder Vicky, Mansi Rawat and Deepak Kapoor. It was released theatrically in India on 30 October 2026.

== Plot ==
The film follows a young woman who finds herself caught between her first love, Wasim Akhtar, and Abhimanyu Yadav, whom her family wants her to marry. As she deals with personal trauma and family expectations, she faces a difficult decision concerning her relationships and future.

== Cast ==
- Pragati Tiwari
- Vishal Mohan
- Ankit Bhadana
- Rajat Tanwar
- Suvinder Vicky
- Kuldeep Singh
- Deepak Kapoor
- Sajida Khan
- Mansi Rawat
- Jayant Katariya
- Sagar Solanki

== Production ==
The film was directed by Ankit Bhadana and written by Ayaskaant Tomar. Sandeep Tomar produced the film under Om Thakurani Production. Shekhar Shinde worked as the cinematographer, while Kiran Rajendra Madre and Praveen Bishnoi handled editing. Vishnu Narayan composed the music and background score.

The film was initially titled Yadav Ji Ki Love Story. In an interview with The Times of India, actor Vishal Mohan discussed the change of title, stating that the filmmakers decided to change it after considering objections from members of the Yadav community. The film subsequently adopted the title Love Story Abhimanyu Ki.

== Release ==
The film was released in Indian theatres on 30 October 2026. It has a runtime of 122 minutes and received an A certificate from the Central Board of Film Certification.
