= Ishita Dutta =

Indian actress and model

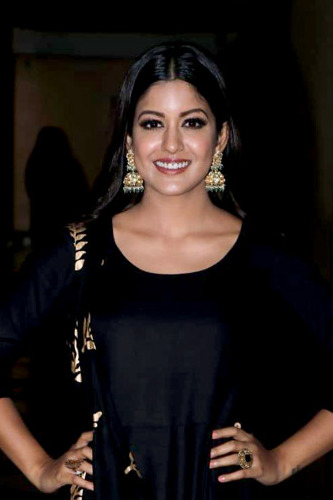
- Dutta at a Club in Andheri, Mumbai, 2019
- Born: 26 August 1990 (age 36); Jamshedpur, Bihar, (present-day Jharkhand), India
- Occupation: Actress
- Years active: 2011–present
- Notable work: Drishyam; Drishyam 2 Bepanah Pyaar
- Spouse: Vatsal Sheth (m. 2017)
- Children: 2
- Relatives: Tanushree Dutta (elder sister)

Ishita Dutta (born 26 August 1990) is an Indian actress and model who works predominantly in Hindi television and films apart from Telugu and Kannada films.

== Early life ==
Dutta was raised in Jamshedpur, Jharkhand, to a Bengali Hindu family. Her elder sister, Tanushree Dutta, was also a model and actress, who won the Femina Miss India title in 2004.

== Personal life ==
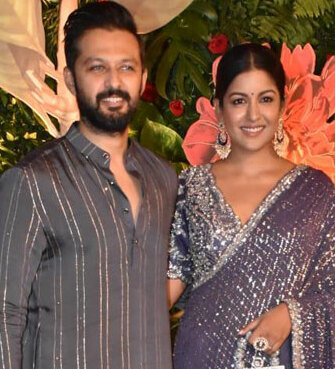
Dutta with husband Vatsal Sheth in 2022

Dutta met actor Vatsal Sheth on the sets of their show Rishton Ka Saudagar - Baazigar in 2016. Dutta married Sheth on 28 November 2017 in Mumbai. In March 2023, the couple announced their pregnancy and had a baby boy on 19 July 2023. The couple had a baby girl on June 10, 2025.

== Filmography ==
=== Films ===
Year	Title	Role	Language	Notes	Ref.
2012	Chanakyudu	Swapna	Telugu		
2015	Raja Rajendra	Swathi	Kannada		
2015	Drishyam	Anju Salgaonkar	Hindi		
2017	Firangi	Sargi	Hindi		
2018	Lashtam Pashtam	Zayanah	Hindi		
2019	Setters	Prerna	Hindi		
2019	Blank	Husna	Hindi		
2020	Kahaa Toh Tha	Myraa	Hindi	Short film	
2022	Drishyam 2	Anju Salgaonkar	Hindi		
2025	De De Pyaar De 2	Kittu	Hindi		
2026	Ghamasaan	Aparna Singh	Hindi		
2026	Drishyam: The Conclusion	Anju Salgaonkar	Hindi		

=== Television ===
Year	Title	Role	Notes	Ref.
2013–2014	Ek Ghar Banaunga	Poonam Garg		
2013	Nach Baliye 6	Poonam Garg	Guest appearance	
2016	Rishton Ka Saudagar - Baazigar	Arundhati Trivedi		
2018	Kaun Hai? - Ek Naya Adhyay	Vaishnavi Choudhary		
2018	Bepannah	Herself	Guest appearance	
2019–2020	Bepanah Pyaar	Bani Malhotra / Pragati Saxena		
2019	Bigg Boss 13	Bani Malhotra / Pragati Saxena	Guest appearance	
2019	Khatra Khatra Khatra	Herself	Guest appearance	
2021–2022	Thoda sa Baadal Thoda sa Paani	Kajol Mukherjee Basu		
2021	Sirf Tum	Kajol Mukherjee Basu	Guest appearance	

=== Music videos ===
Year	Title	Singer	Ref.
2020	Rehne Do Zara	Soham Naik	
2020	Kithe	Vishal Mishra	
