= List of Hindi films of 2027 =

This is a list of Hindi language films produced in Bollywood in India that are scheduled to be released in the year 2027.

== January–March ==
Opening		Title	Director	Cast	Studio (production house)	Ref.
J A N	8	Golmaal 5	Rohit Shetty	Ajay Devgn; Akshay Kumar; Priyamani; Arshad Warsi; Tusshar Kapoor; Kunal Khemu; Shreyas Talpade; Sharman Joshi; Johnny Lever; Sanjay Mishra; Mukesh Tiwari; Ashwini Kalsekar	Rohit Shetty Picturez	
J A N	21	Love & War	Sanjay Leela Bhansali	Ranbir Kapoor; Alia Bhatt; Vicky Kaushal	Bhansali Productions	
F E B	5	Tera Sai	Palash Muchhal	Sanjay Mishra; Sayaji Shinde; Manoj Joshi; Omkar Das Manikpuri; Avika Gor; Rohan Mehra	S3 Films	
F E B	5	Silaa	Omung Kumar	Harshvardhan Rane; Sadia Khateeb; Karan Veer Mehra; Ipsitaa	Zee Studios, Blue Lotus Pictures, Stark Entertainment	
F E B	5	Hero Ki Horrorine	Sajid Khan	Yashvardhan Ahuja; Nitanshi Goel; Sunita Ahuja; Jamie Lever; Chunky Panday; Brijendra Kala; Simrat Kaur	Balaji Motion Pictures, Jai Ho Media Ventures	
F E B	12	Naagzilla	Mrighdeep Singh Lamba	Kartik Aaryan; Preity Mukhundhan; Ravi Kishan	Dharma Productions, Mahaveer Jain Films	
F E B	19	Mupapa	Sameer Saxena	Ayushmann Khurrana; Shreya Chaudhry	Yash Raj Films, Posham Pa Pictures	
M A R	5	#SVC63	Vamshi Paidipally	Salman Khan; Nayanthara; Anil Kapoor; Arvind Swamy; Jackie Shroff; Rajpal Yadav; Rahul Dev; Abhimanyu Singh; Sagarika Ghatge; Muzammil Ibrahim; Ronit Roy; Seema Biswas	Sri Venkateswara Creations	
M A R	5	Khosla Ka Ghosla 2	Priya Mishra; Prashant Bhagia	Anupam Kher; Boman Irani; Ravi Kishan; Divya Khosla Kumar; Ranvir Shorey; Parvin Dabas; Tara Sharma; Kiran Juneja; Nishank Verma; Kangan Baruah Nangia; Danish Iqbal	T-Series Films, Tandav Films	
M A R	19	Force 3	Bhav Dhulia	John Abraham; Harshvardhan Rane; Tanya Maniktala; Surya Sharma	JA Entertainment, Karolina Corporation	
M A R	26	Beparwah	Ali Abbas Zafar	Ahaan Panday; Sharvari; Aaishvary Thackeray; Bobby Deol; Jimmy Sheirgill; Anya Singh	Yash Raj Films	

== April–June ==
Opening		Title	Director	Cast	Studio (production house)	Ref.
A P R	30	Untitled film	Anurag Basu	Kartik Aaryan; Sreeleela	T-Series Films	
M A Y	14	Lag Ja Gale	Raj Mehta	Tiger Shroff; Janhvi Kapoor; Lakshya	Dharma Productions	
M A Y	14	Dada: The Sourav Ganguly Story	Vikramaditya Motwane	Rajkummar Rao	T-Series Films, Luv Films, DBL	
M A Y	28	Samuk	Kanishk Varma	Akshay Kumar; Rukmini Maitr; Vineet Kumar Singh; Banita Sandhu; Rajat Kapoor; Swanand Kirkire	Sunshine Pictures, Cape of Good Films	
J U N	4	Police Company	Ram Gopal Varma	Harshvardhan Rane; Fardeen Khan; Saurabh Shukla; Paresh Rawal; Fatima Sana Shaikh; Makarand Deshpande; Ashwini Kalsekar	T-Series Films, RGV Company	
J U N	18	Ladaku	Kabir Khan	Kartik Aaryan	Birla Studios, Kabir Khan Entertainment, Dopamine Studios	

== July–September ==
Opening		Title	Director	Cast	Studio (production house)	Ref.
J U L	9	Aisi Deewangi Dekhi Nahi Kahin	Shashank Khaitan	Subhaan Nadiadwala; Airah Bose Roy	214 Entertainment, Nadiadwala Grandson Entertainment	
J U L	30	Side Heroes	Ssanjay Tripaathy	Abhishek Banerjee; Aparshakti Khurana; Varun Sharma; Heer	Mahaveer Jain Films, Window Seat Films	
A U G	6	Birsaait	Nitin Gawde	Dhruva Karunakar	Navaras Entertainment, Ninefold Pictures	
A U G	13	Captain India	Shimit Amin	Kartik Aaryan; Parvathy Thiruvothu; Manish Chaudhari	T-Series Films, Baweja Studios, Midnight Chai Films	

== October–December ==
Opening		Title	Director	Cast	Studio (production house)	Ref.
O C T	1	Chauhaan	Neeraj Yadav	Ajay Devgn; Vikrant Massey	Jio Studios, Colour Yellow Productions	
O C T	29	Mera Yaar Bajrangi	Amit Aryan	Ravi Kishan	Mahaveer Jain Films, Ratpack Stories	
D E C	3	Tumbbad 2	Adesh Prasad	Sohum Shah; Nawazuddin Siddiqui; Alia Bhatt	Pen Studios, Sohum Shah Films	

== See also ==
- Lists of Hindi films
- List of Hindi films of 2026
- List of Hindi films of 2028
