= List of Malayalam films of 2027 =

This is a list of upcoming Malayalam-language to be released in 2027.

== January–March ==
Opening		Title	Director	Cast	Production company / studio	Ref
JANUARY	15	Harivarasanam	Rajesh Nair	Saiju Kurup, Yogi Babu, Baby Eva, Sampath Raj	Ajith Vinayaka Films; Panorama Studios	
