= Rose Sardana =

Indian actress (born 1995)

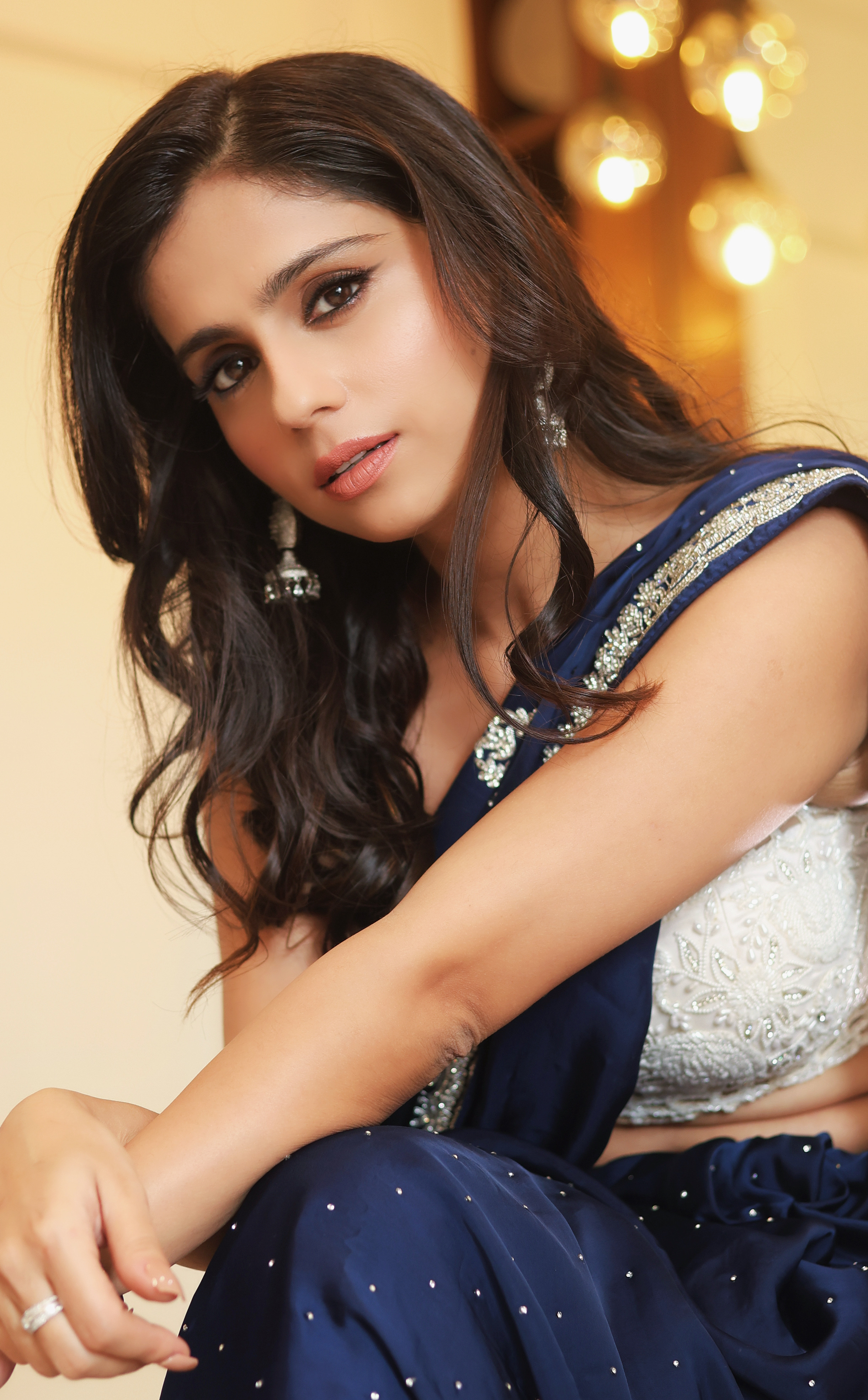
- Rose Sardana in 2024
- Occupations: Actress; television presenter
- Years active: 2015–present

Rose Sardana, also knowns as Rozy Sardana, (born 8 January 1995) is an Indian actress and television presenter. She is known for her film and television appearances in Meri Aashiqui Tum Se Hi (2014), Kundali Bhagya (2017), Muklawa (2019), Akbar Ka Bal Birbal (2020), Drishyam 2 (2022) and Wild Wild Punjab (2024). In addition to her acting credits, she has presented for several brands such as ACC, Reliance Industries, and Coca-Cola, in addition to the 2016 World Twenty20 and 2023 Cricket World Cup.

== Filmography ==
=== Web series ===
Year	Title	Role	Notes
2023	Breaking	Palak	
2023	Kalamanch	Sunaina	
2024	Taxi Driver	Neha	
2024	Wild Wild Punjab	Ginni	

=== Film ===
Year	Title	Role	Notes
2019	Muklawa	Gulaabo	
2022	Drishyam 2	Yatin's girlfriend	
2024	Bhool Bhulaiyaa 3	Meera's sister	
2025	Ek Chatur Naar	Anjali	
2026	IIZ- Indian Institute of zombies	Kiran	

=== Music videos ===
Year	Title	Label
2020	''Dil Da Khayal''	TM Music
2020	''Dil Mein Hindustan''	They See Records
2023	''Aaye Ram Mere''	T-Series

=== Television ===
Year	Title	Role	Channel	Notes
2015-2016	Meri Aashiqui Tumse Hi	Sanaya	Colors	
2017-2018	Vani Rani	Anjali	&TV	
2020	Akbar Ka Bal Birbal	Tilotamma	Star Bharat	
2023	Kundali Bhagya	Mahi Khurana	Zee TV	
2023	Teri Meri Doriyaann	Kiara Baweja	StarPlus	
