= Krishna Aur Chitthi =

Upcoming Indian Hindi-language film

- Directed by: Vinaay Bhhardwaj
- Produced by: Ravina Thakkur; Vinaay Bhhardwaj
- Starring: Darsheel Safary; Arun Govil
- Music by: Puneet Dixit
- Production company: Shining Sun Studios
- Release date: 29 May 2026
- Country: India
- Language: Hindi

Krishna Aur Chitthi is a 2026 Indian Hindi-language sports drama film directed by Vinaay Bhhardwaj and produced by Ravina Thakkur and Vinaay Bhhardwaj under the banner of Shining Sun Studios. The film stars Darsheel Safary and Arun Govil in lead roles. The film explores themes of faith, cricket and family relationships. It is scheduled to be theatrically released on 29 May 2026.

== Premise ==
The film follows a young cricketer whose personal journey becomes intertwined with spirituality, devotion and emotional struggles within his family.

== Cast ==
- Darsheel Safary as Arjun
- Arun Govil as Pandit Radheshayam
- Sajjad Delafrooz as MLA Iqbal Qureshi
- Mir Sarwar as Coach Khalid
- Javed Khan as Khalid

== Production ==
The film is produced by Ravina Thakkur and Vinaay Bhhardwaj under the banner of Shining Sun Studios. Portions of the film were reportedly shot in Kashmir.

== Release ==
Krishna Aur Chitthi is scheduled for theatrical release in India on 29 May 2026.
