= Return of the Jungle =

- Film poster
- Directed by: Vaibhav Kumaresh
- Screenplay by: Vaibhav Kumaresh; Prosenjit Ganguly
- Story by: Vaibhav Kumaresh
- Produced by: Vaibhav Kumaresh; Suranjana Kumaresh
- Starring: Pichai Rangaswamy; Jhanvi Patro; Sagarika Chandrakanth; Tanya Sinha
- Music by: Roto Shah; Narayan Parasuram; Advait Nemlekar
- Production company: Vaibhav Studios
- Distributed by: Janta Cinema
- Release dates: 21 November 2023 (Goa); 29 May 2026 (India)
- Country: India
- Language: Hindi

Return of the Jungle is a 2023 Indian Hindi-language animated film directed by Vaibhav Kumaresh and produced by Vaibhav Studios. Inspired by the Panchatantra and folktales of India, the film had its world premiere at the 54th International Film Festival of India in 2023, and it was released theatrically in India on 29 May 2026.

== Plot ==
Set in contemporary India, Return of the Jungle (ROTJ) follows a group of junior school classmates. For Mihir, Rohan, Sweety, Ali, and their friends, the simple challenges of everyday school life often seem like huge problems. Coming to their rescue is their close friend Thatha, a lovable grandfather figure who encourages them through his inspiring stories from the jungles of ancient India. His stories motivate the children to face their struggles and always give their best.

The film primarily focuses on 9-year-old Mihir and his friends as they attempt to outwit Rahul Malhotra, the biggest bully in their school. To help them through this difficult journey, Thatha shares imaginative tales that inspire courage, determination, friendship, and compassion. Along the way, the children build a dinosaur model, take part in an intense game of cricket, and travel to Rajasthan, rediscovering the value of friendship and courage.

== Cast ==
- Pichai Rangaswamy as Thatha
- Jhanvi Patro and Sagarika Chandrakanth as Sweety
- Tanya Sinha as Harpreet
- Jaden Mascarenhas and Izaan Mirza as Mihir
- Vaibhav Thakkar as Dhondoo
- Aryan Sharma, Anay Patil and Sairaj Naik as Rohan
- Advait Soman as Advait Soman
- Rohan Yadav, Aariel Narvekar and Arav Bhatia as Ali
- Devansh Doshi as Rahul Malhotra
- Manish Bhawan as Sharma Sir
- Saurav Chakraborty as Shikari

== Production ==
The film is produced by Vaibhav Studios, an Indian animation company, and directed by Vaibhav Kumaresh.

The project adapts stories from the Panchatantra within a contemporary narrative framework. The film was self-financed by the studio and developed over several years.

Return of the Jungle was showcased at the Cannes Film Market and had earlier festival screenings, including at the International Film Festival of India

== Release ==
Return of the Jungle is scheduled for theatrical release in India on 29 May 2026. A teaser trailer was released in April 2026.

== Reception ==
Shubhra Gupta of The Indian Express rated it 3/5 stars and said that while the film was "dotted with several 'teachable' moments, it never forgets to add in the fun bits, and that's where it scores." Vinamra Mathur of Firstpost gave 3 stars out of 5 and writes that the film was a "delightful family entertainer that combines fun with valuable life lessons. It is the kind of film that children will enjoy in the moment and parents will appreciate for the values it leaves behind—a gentle reminder that sometimes the most powerful heroes are the stories we grow up hearing." Archika Khurana of The Times of India gave 3 stars out of 5 and said that "If you're looking for a wholesome, kid-friendly film that celebrates Indian storytelling traditions with warmth, humour and colourful animation, this one is for you."
