= Drishyam: The Conclusion =

2026 Indian film by Abhishek Pathak

- Theatrical release poster
- Directed by: Abhishek Pathak
- Screenplay by: Abhishek Pathak; Aamil Keeyan Khan; Parveez Shaikh
- Dialogues by: Aamil Keyan Khan
- Story by: Abhishek Pathak
- Produced by: Kumar Mangat Pathak; Abhishek Pathak; Ajit Andhare; Alok Jain
- Starring: Ajay Devgn; Tabu; Shriya Saran; Jaideep Ahlawat; Rajat Kapoor; Prakash Raj; Ishita Dutta; Mrunal Jadhav
- Cinematography: Sudhir K. Chaudhary
- Edited by: Sandeep Francis
- Music by: Songs: Ravi Basrur; Rochak Kohli; Karma; Score: Amar Mohile
- Production companies: Panorama Studios; Star Studio18
- Distributed by: Star Studio18 (India); Panorama Studios; Zee Studios (Overseas)
- Release date: 2 October 2026
- Running time: 150 minutes
- Country: India
- Language: Hindi
- Budget: ₹100–110 crore (Note: News18 reported the budget as ₹100 crore.; The Free Press Journal reported the budget as ₹110 crore.)
- Box office: ₹577.12 crore

Drishyam: The Conclusion (Note: Also known as Drishyam 3) is a 2026 Indian Hindi-language crime thriller film co-written, produced, and directed by Abhishek Pathak. Produced by Panorama Studios and Star Studio18, it is a sequel to Drishyam 2 (2022). Unlike its predecessors, the film features an original story and is not narratively connected to its Malayalam counterpart. The film stars Ajay Devgn, Tabu, Shriya Saran, Jaideep Ahlawat, Rajat Kapoor, Prakash Raj, Ishita Dutta and Mrunal Jadhav.

Principal photography took place from December 2025 to June 2026 primarily in Mumbai and Goa. Drishyam: The Conclusion was released in theatres on 2 October 2026, coinciding with Gandhi Jayanti.

The film received positive reviews from critics. It is currently the 3rd highest-grossing Hindi film of 2026, the 4th highest-grossing Indian film of 2026 and the 11th highest grossing Hindi film domestically.

== Plot ==
Six months after Vijay Salgaonkar was released due to lack of evidence, (Note: As shown in Drishyam 2 (2022).) the case against the Salgaonkar family has been closed due to a lack of evidence. Devastated by her inability to prove Vijay's involvement in her son Sameer's death, Meera Deshmukh's mental state deteriorates. Her husband, Mahesh, eventually asks SP Rajveer Singh Tomar of the Crime Branch to reopen the investigation, despite previously opposing the idea.

Despite DNA testing proving that the skeleton recovered in the previous investigation did not belong to Sameer, Tomar suspects that Vijay may have replaced Sameer's skeletal remains shortly before the court proceedings. He and Laxmikant Gaitonde quietly resume the investigation, monitoring Vijay's movements. During their surveillance, they discover that Vijay has been frequently visiting a local church and has befriended Raghu, the security guard at a medical college, where the evidence was previously stored. Raghu reveals that Vijay visited the college with him on the night of 23 July 2021, and they drank together until passing out. As the college had no functioning CCTV cameras covering the evidence room, Tomar concludes that Vijay used the opportunity to swap Sameer's skeleton with another set of remains.

Tomar investigates the origin of the unidentified skeleton and traces it to Christopher Pinto. His investigation leads him to Christopher's grave and its caretaker Savio D'Souza, who has disappeared. Meanwhile, Vijay maintains a respectable public image, regularly visiting a local church and making donations while continuing to work on his upcoming film. He also begins working with a prop artist to create a highly realistic prop for its production.

Vijay's elder daughter, Anju, deeply concerned about her family's case being reopened, remains reluctant to move on with her life. Vijay reassures her that he has filed a petition in the High Court to permanently close the case. Savio is eventually located in Kerala and agrees to submit a written statement against Vijay, implicating him in the disappearance and replacement of Christopher's skeleton. Meanwhile, Meera and Mahesh hire prominent lawyer Indrajith Shetty to represent them. At the hearing, Raghu testifies that Vijay was with him, while Savio retracts his statement, claiming police coercion. Shetty argues that the conflicting evidence warrants further investigation and requests the court to order the excavation of Christopher's grave. Despite objections from Vijay's defense, the court grants the request.

When Tomar and his team arrive at the cemetery, they are confronted by members of the local Christian community, who oppose the excavation on religious grounds. The excavation eventually takes place; however, to everyone's surprise, Christopher's skeletal remains are found intact. Concurrently, Shetty questions Nandini about Vijay's whereabouts on the night of 23 July 2021. She states that Vijay was at home. Shetty then presents audio recordings gathered by undercover officers, Shiv and Jenny, who purchased a property next to the Salgaonkar residence and installed surveillance equipment. (Note: As shown in Drishyam 2 (2022).) The audio recordings place Vijay inside his home, directly contradicting Raghu's testimony. Due to conflicting evidence, the court finds that reasonable doubt exists, acquits the Salgaonkar family, and permanently closes the case.

After the hearing, Tomar, Meera, Mahesh, Shiv, and Jenny reconstruct Vijay's scheme. Approximately two and a half years earlier, Jenny and Shiv purchased the neighbouring property while working undercover and secretly monitored his house. Anticipating the surveillance, Vijay, with his family's assistance, used prerecorded recordings to create the impression that he was at home on the night of 23 July 2021, while he was actually at the medical college with Raghu.

To delay the excavation, Vijay used the false identity "Sister Pereira" to repeatedly warn members of the local Christian community that the government planned to demolish their church and cemetery to acquire the land. Vijay's deception prevents the police from thoroughly examining Christopher's grave. Although they reconstruct his plan, they have no evidence that can be used to prove it in court. Christopher's skeleton remains in his grave, the recordings appear to place Vijay at home, and the community continues to oppose further excavation. The whereabouts of the skeleton originally used to replace Sameer's remain unknown.

The whereabouts of the skeleton are revealed when Vijay meets Savio. Savio had expected Vijay to return Christopher's skeleton after using it in the exchange. However, because the skeleton was placed under strict surveillance in the evidence room, Vijay was unable to retrieve it. His months-long work with the prop artist served another purpose: the film prop was actually a highly detailed replica of a human skeleton. With Savio's assistance, Vijay secretly places the replica inside Christopher's grave, fulfilling his promise to Savio while convincing both the authorities and the local community that Christopher's remains were never disturbed. Ultimately, Vijay turns the evidence meant to expose him into part of his alibi, leaving the police without usable evidence against his family.

== Cast ==
- Ajay Devgn as Vijay Salgaonkar
- Tabu as Meera Deshmukh, former Inspector general of police; Sam's mother
- Shriya Saran as Nandini Salgaonkar, Vijay's wife; Anju and Anu's mother
- Jaideep Ahlawat as SP Rajveer Singh Tomar IPS, Crime Branch
- Rajat Kapoor as Mahesh Deshmukh, Meera's husband; Sam's father
- Prakash Raj as Public Prosecutor Indrajith Shetty
- Ishita Dutta as Anju Salgaonkar, Vijay and Nandini's elder daughter
- Mrunal Jadhav as Anu Salgaonkar, Vijay and Nandini's younger daughter
- Kamlesh Sawant as SI Laxmikant Gaitonde
- Saurabh Shukla as Murad Ali, Writer
- Samvedna Suwalka as Adv. Gayatri Mohan
- Nishant Singh as SI Shiv Kulkarni
- Neha Joshi as ASI Jenny Thomas
- Ajeet Singh as Raghu Naik
- Ramchandra Singh as Savio D'Souza
- Akashdeep Sabir as Justice Joseph Mathews
- Jiten Lalwani as Mr. Kamat
- Leena Sharma as Mrs. Kamat
- Manish Tyagi as Vineet Kamat
- Jairoop Jeevan as Jacob De Mello
- Sanjay Dadhich as Paolo Fernandes
- Lalit Sawant as Nilesh Shinde
- Amir Salim Khan as Anil Kamath
- Ajoy Chakraborty as Father Moses
- Dodo Bhujwala as Cyrus
- Abhishek Gaikwad as Suhaas
- Shivraj Walvekar as DGP Sinha
- Aarti Desai as Principal Nair

== Production ==
=== Development ===
In May 2025, it was confirmed that the third instalment of the original film series would be remade in Hindi. Earlier reports suggested that the original and remake would be filmed and released together simultaneously. However, Jeethu Joseph dismissed these reports, clarifying that original film would release first. In May 2026, Jeethu Joseph confirmed that the film would feature a different narrative from the original version. In August 2026, the film's official title was revealed as Drishyam: The Conclusion by the makers.

=== Casting ===
In October 2025, Paresh Rawal was reported to have been offered a role in the film. Akshaye Khanna was initially set to reprise his role from the prequel but later exited the project due to creative and financial disagreements with the producers. He was subsequently replaced by Jaideep Ahlawat. In February 2026, Prakash Raj joined the cast.

=== Filming ===
Principal photography began in December 2025 in Mumbai. In January 2026, filming continued in Goa. Filming was completed in June 2026.

== Music ==
Drishyam: The Conclusion

Soundtrack album by Ravi Basrur, Rochak Kohli and Karma
- Released: 28 September 2026
- Recorded: 2025–26
- Studios: AMV Studio, Mumbai; Soundemic Studios, Dubai
- Genre: Feature film soundtrack
- Length: 14:54
- Language: Hindi
- Label: Sony Music India
- Producers: Ravi Basrur, Chethan Handattu, Rochak Kohli, Karma, AK4EAL
External audio
- Drishyam: The Conclusion - Jukebox on YouTube

The music of the film is composed by Ravi Basrur, Rochak Kohli and Karma, with lyrics written by Manoj Muntashir, Aamil Keeyan Khan, and Karma. The film score is composed by Amar Mohile.

The first single titled "Vingansa" was released on 17 September 2026. The second single titled "Muskura Do" was released on 23 September 2026. The third single titled "Game Over" was released on 28 September 2026.

Track listing
No.	Title	Lyrics	Music	Singer(s)	Length
1.	"Vingansa"	Aamil Keeyan Khan	Ravi Basrur	Siddharth Basrur	4:31
2.	"Muskura Do"	Manoj Muntashir	Rochak Kohli	Lucky Ali	3:51
3.	"Daastaan – The Drishyam Recap"	Aamil Keeyan Khan	Ravi Basrur	Sunidhi Chauhan	4:12
4.	"Game Over"	Karma	Karma	Karma	2:20
Total length:					14:54

== Release ==
=== Theatrical ===
In December 2025, an announcement video revealed the release date as 2 October 2026, coinciding with Gandhi Jayanti, which was marketed as "Drishyam Day". The film's official trailer was revealed on 9 September 2026 at a special event in Panjim, Goa.

=== Distribution ===
Panorama Studios and Zee Studios acquired the overseas theatrical distribution rights.

=== Home media ===
The film will began streaming on Netflix from 27 November 2026.

== Reception ==
=== Box office ===
Drishyam The Conclusion grossed ₹550.65 crore (US$59 million) worldwide. It grossed ₹421.45 crore (US$45 million) in India and ₹129.2 crore (US$14 million) in overseas market.

On its opening day, the film earned ₹62.03 crore net at the domestic box office.

=== Critical response ===
On the review aggregator website Rotten Tomatoes, 94% of 18 critics' reviews are positive, with an average rating of 6.7/10.

Sajin Shrijith of The Week, finding the film superior to its Malayalam counterpart, gave it 4 stars out of 5 and wrote in the epigraph of his review, "Drishyam 3: The Conclusion, led by Ajay Devgn, excels by opting for a unique narrative rather than mimicking its predecessors, focusing on emotional depth and intricate storytelling about perceived, genuine, and fabricated truths." Renuka Vyavahare of The Times of India gave the film 3.5 stars out of 5 and noted at the end of her review, "Drishyam 3 chooses to stick to the franchise's standard template rather than risk reinventing it. At two-and-a-half hours, however, the film begins to drag towards the end and could have benefited from tighter editing. Still, its biggest strength remains its ability to keep you immersed and consistently anxious about what happens next." Anuj Kumar of The Hindu wrote, "The script smartly absorbs the franchise’s obsession, where viewers see Vijay as an unbeatable folk hero. So, instead of showing us how he hides the crime, the screenplay spends a lot of time on how the system attempts to deconstruct the myth of a 4th-grade dropout. In this subversion of power, Ajay Devgn's inscrutable face forces the polished system to peel back its civility and resort to desperate hostility." Pragati Awasthi of WION summed up in her review, "For me, Drishyam: The Conclusion gave me the satisfying ending my inner soul was wishing for." Shubhra Gupta of The Indian Express gave the film 3 stars out of 5, observing, "But while the men do most of the heavy lifting, I don't think I will be able to forget Tabu's wounded eyes, which belong to a mother unable to comprehend a world which doesn't have her only child. She's terrific, as always."

Saibal Chatterjee of NDTV also gave the film 3 stars out of 5, writing, "Riding on a taut script that is predicated on mishaps and moves of the past, Drishyam: The Conclusion stitches together a tale that is fascinating enough not to lose much steam as it makes its way to a flummoxing and inconclusive denouement. The elements strewn along the pathway to the climax do their bit to hold the film together." Sana Farzeen of India Today, too, gave the film 3 stars out of 5, writing in her review, "The film moves with confidence, but the problem comes in when it occasionally becomes too indulgent. There is a lot of dialogue-baazi, and while some of it is entertaining, most of it begins to feel like the writers are enjoying their own cleverness a little too much. There is a courtroom exchange where the judge tells everyone to come to the "mudde ki baat", and honestly, there are moments when you want to say the same thing to the film." Likewise, Chirag Sehgal of News18 gave the film 3 stars out of 5 and noted, "Drishyam 3: The Conclusion is a gripping and fast-paced thriller that understands the appeal of its franchise. It keeps you invested and benefits from strong performances, particularly from Ajay Devgn, Jaideep Ahlawat, Prakash Raj and Kamlesh Sawant. However, the film's biggest strength is also its weakness. It is not a bad film but it sticks closely to the Drishyam formula, making it familiar. It is not a grand conclusion that the franchise deserved." Sukanya Verma of Rediff.com gave the film 2.5 stars out of 5. She noted, juxtaposing against Malayalam counterpart, "Georgekutty [Drishyam 3 protagonist] monetises the guilt he is burdened by to make his movie making dreams come true. He's a hypocrite and conformist yet accepting of his flaws and errors. No such character evolution is to be found in Drishyam: The Conclusion." Bryan Durham of Variety India pointed out, "the cat-and-mouse game is not as entertaining as it once was. There’s nothing to look forward to anymore: not the novelty or enthusiasm that defined the first film, not the tension and game of wits that elevated the second."
