= The India Story =

2026 film directed by Chettan DK

- Directed by: Chettan DK
- Written by: Sagar B Shinde
- Produced by: Sagar B Shinde
- Starring: Kajal Aggarwal; Shreyas Talpade
- Cinematography: Nishant Bhagwat
- Edited by: Ashish Mhatre
- Music by: Mangesh Dhakde
- Production companies: Zee Studios; MIG Productions & Studios
- Distributed by: Zee Studios
- Release date: 24 July 2026
- Running time: 130 minutes
- Country: India
- Language: Hindi

The India Story: Slow Poison in Progress is an Indian Hindi-language drama film directed by Chetan DK and produced by Sagar B. Shinde. The film stars Kajal Aggarwal and Shreyas Talpade in lead roles.

The film was released theatrically on 24 July 2026.

== Cast ==
- Kajal Aggarwal as Archana Patil
- Shreyas Talpade as Yogesh Patil
- Murali Sharma as IG Vijay Rathode
- Manish Wadhwa as Lawyer Vardhan Agnihotri
- Trisha Sarda as Pari Patil, Yogesh & Archana's daughter
- Atul Tiwari
- Kamlesh Sawant
- Sham Mashalkar

== Production ==
Principal photography began in January 2025 in Pune, Maharashtra, and concluded in October 2025, with several portions filmed in Kolhapur.

== Release ==
The India Story was released theatrically on 24 July 2026 in Hindi, Tamil and Telugu languages.
