= Drishyam 2 (2022 film) =

2022 Indian film by Abhishek Pathak

- Theatrical release poster
- Directed by: Abhishek Pathak
- Screenplay by: Abhishek Pathak; Aamil Keeyan Khan
- Dialogues by: Aamil Keeyan Khan
- Story by: Jeethu Joseph
- Based on: Drishyam 2 by Jeethu Joseph
- Produced by: Bhushan Kumar; Krishan Kumar; Kumar Mangat Pathak; Abhishek Pathak
- Starring: Ajay Devgn; Akshaye Khanna; Tabu; Shriya Saran; Ishita Dutta; Mrunal Jadhav; Rajat Kapoor
- Cinematography: Sudhir K. Chaudhary
- Edited by: Sandeep Francis
- Music by: Devi Sri Prasad
- Production companies: Panorama Studios; Viacom18 Studios; T-Series Films
- Distributed by: Panorama Studios (India); Yash Raj Films (International)
- Release date: 18 November 2022
- Running time: 142 minutes
- Country: India
- Language: Hindi
- Budget: ₹50 crore
- Box office: est. ₹345.05 crore

Drishyam 2 (transl. Visual 2) is a 2022 Indian Hindi-language crime thriller film co-written, directed, and produced by Abhishek Pathak. Produced by Panorama Studios, Viacom18 Studios, and T-Series, it is a remake of the 2021 Malayalam film of the same name and sequel to the 2015 film Drishyam. The film stars Ajay Devgn, Akshaye Khanna, Tabu, Shriya Saran, Ishita Dutta, Mrunal Jadhav and Rajat Kapoor in lead roles.

Following the release of the original film in February 2021, the remake came into development and was announced the same year. Pathak took over as director following the death of Nishikant Kamat in 2020. Principal photography took place from February to June 2022, primarily in Goa with schedules in Mumbai and Hyderabad. Devi Sri Prasad composed the film's soundtrack, with lyrics written by Amitabh Bhattacharya.

Drishyam 2 was released on 18 November 2022, and received positive reviews with praise towards the performances, screenplay, cinematography and editing. The film grossed ₹100 crore (US$11 million) worldwide in four days and entered the 100 Crore Club in India within six days of release. Earning ₹345 crore (US$37 million) worldwide, Drishyam 2 emerged as a major commercial success, emerging as the second highest-grossing Hindi film of 2022 and the 24th highest-grossing Hindi film of all time.

== Plot ==
On the night of 3 October 2014, a man named David Braganza flees from authorities after committing a murder. While hiding behind an under construction site, he witnesses Vijay Salgaonkar emerging from it. David later tries to escape with his wife and son but ends up getting arrested.

Seven years later, Vijay, Nandini, Anju and Anu are living contentedly. Vijay is now an affluent businessman who owns a movie theatre and still operates a cable company. He aspires to make a film of his own and is in frequent contact with screenwriter Murad Ali to develop the script. Anju has PTSD and recurring episodes of epilepsy, a result of her involvement in Sam's death. Jealous of the family, a number of locals have resorted to spreading rumours about Anju being in a relationship with Sam, much to Nandini's distress. Her only solace is her friendly neighbor, Jenny, who is frequently abused by her alcoholic husband, Shiv.

On Sam's death anniversary, Vijay has an encounter with Sam's father Mahesh Deshmukh, who asks him to disclose the location of his son's remains, which Vijay does not respond to. Meanwhile, Nandini spends more time with Jenny and inadvertently reveals that Anju is the one who accidentally killed Sam. Unknown to her, Jenny and Shiv are married undercover cops, assigned by IG Tarun Ahlawat, who is a close friend and colleague of his predecessor Meera Deshmukh.

At the same time, David is released from jail. After struggling to reconcile with his now-estranged wife, he yearns to find employment. While coming to know that Vijay's case is still progressing, he recalls the latter's presence at the then-under-construction police station and realizes that Vijay was in fact complicit with the murder. He tips Tarun, who summons Meera and Mahesh from London. After the trio bribes him, David divulges what he saw, leading to the newly built police station being unearthed. The police eventually discover a skeleton. Vijay, having noticed this through his CCTV cameras which he had installed around the police station, seemingly gives up.

Tarun summons Vijay's family for questioning. While Vijay, Nandini, Anu, and Anju manage to maintain their alibi; Meera uncovers a voice recording of Nandini's prior confession to Jenny; the police bugged the family's residence, exposing the family. Gaitonde thrashes Nandini, Anju and Anu, causing Anju to have one of her epileptic fits. Distraught, Vijay falsely confesses to Tarun that he murdered Sam. With the police satisfied, the family are let go, and Vijay gets arrested and put on trial for Sam's murder, although Meera isn't satisfied and demands that Vijay's family be punished as well.

Having learnt of Vijay's arrest, Murad visits Tarun, Meera and Mahesh. He reveals that during one of his encounters with Vijay, the latter had fabricated a script for a future crime thriller, loosely based on Sam's murder. He reveals that the script had been turned into a novel titled Drishyam, although it was published under Murad's name for copyright protection. Vijay pleads not guilty, with his lawyer claiming that the police used Drishyam's plot as a means to frame him. Furthermore, the judge, Subodh Chatterjee, reveals that the DNA tests conducted on the skeleton do not match Sam's DNA.

Murad reveals that Vijay had created an alternate climax for his film in which the hero, knowing his initial plan might fail, would get the remains of another male of the same age and sex who had died of similar injuries to those of the villain, by befriending the gravedigger (Savio) of the local cemetery. The hero would keep the skeletal remains with him for three years before befriending the security guard (Raghu) of the district medical college morgue under the pretext of promising him a role in his film. The same night the remains which were excavated from the police station arrive at the morgue, the hero would swap the bodies before the DNA examination takes place.

Vijay is released on bail due to a lack of evidence, and the police are prohibited from investigating the family. Subodh calls Tarun to his chambers and tells him to end all investigations against Vijay and his family, as he believes both families deserve justice, but the legal system is unable to provide it to them, and such cases are not new to the system. Outside the courthouse, Murad discloses to Meera and Mahesh that Vijay's alternative climax had a twist in which the hero would hand over the villain's cremated remains to the bereaved parents. At the same time, Vijay has Sam's cremated remains anonymously handed over to Meera and Mahesh.

Mahesh immerses Sam's remains and persuades Meera to let go of her animosity towards Vijay, as he accepts they have found closure and believes Vijay would do anything to protect his family. Vijay, who was watching from afar, solemnly leaves.

== Cast ==
- Ajay Devgn as Vijay Salgaonkar, a theatre owner and aspiring film producer; Nandini's husband; Anju and Anu's father
- Akshaye Khanna as IG Tarun Ahlawat IPS
- Tabu as Meera Deshmukh, Sam's mother; former Inspector general of police
- Shriya Saran as Nandini Salgaonkar, Vijay's wife; Anju and Anu's mother
- Ishita Dutta as Anju Salgaonkar, Vijay and Nandini's elder daughter
- Mrunal Jadhav as Anu Salgaonkar, Vijay and Nandini's younger daughter
- Rajat Kapoor as Mahesh Deshmukh, Meera's husband; Sam's father
- Saurabh Shukla as Murad Ali, a screenwriter
- Kamlesh Sawant as Laxmikant Gaitonde
- Yogesh Soman as Inspector Vinayak Sawant
- Neha Joshi as ASI Jenny Thomas, Vijay and Nandini's neighbor; an undercover police officer
- Nishant Singh as SI Shiv Kulkarni, Jenny's husband; an undercover police officer
- Siddharth Bodke as David Braganza
- Ashmita Jaggi as Mary Braganza
- Samvedna Suwalka as Advocate Gayatri Mohan, Vijay's lawyer
- Sameer Deshpande as Public Prosecutor Siraj Ahmed
- Harish Khatri as Justice Subodh Chatterjee, Sessions Court
- Ajeet Singh as Raghu
- Prathamesh Parab as Jose
- Sharad Bhutadiya as Martin
- Ramchandra Singh as Savio

== Production ==
Drishyam 2 (2021) is the sequel to the original 2013 Malayalam film Drishyam (2013), and was released in February 2021. It was decided that the remake version of the Malayalam film in Hindi will be directed by Abhishek Pathak, after Nishikant Kamat, who directed the first instalment in 2015, passed away during the COVID-19 pandemic. The film is produced by Panorama Studios and distributed by Yash Raj Films in association with Phars Film Co. LLC.

Principal photography commenced on 17 February 2022 in Mumbai and was extensively shot in Goa with Ajay Devgn and Shriya Saran. Tabu joined the cast on 26 April, and later on, Akshaye Khanna joined on 30 April. Filming was wrapped on 21 June 2022 in Hyderabad.

== Music ==
Drishyam 2

Soundtrack album by Devi Sri Prasad
- Released: 18 November 2022
- Recorded: 2022
- Genre: Feature film soundtrack
- Length: 10:11
- Language: Hindi
- Label: Panorama Music
- Producer: Devi Sri Prasad

Devi Sri Prasad chronology
Ranga Ranga Vaibhavanga (2022)	Drishyam 2 (2022)	Cirkus (2022)

Official audio
- Drishyam 2 - Full Album on YouTube

The film's music is composed by Devi Sri Prasad with lyrics are written by Amitabh Bhattacharya. The first single, "Saath Hum Rahein," was released on 1 November 2022.

All lyrics are written by Amitabh Bhattacharya.

Track listing
No.	Title	Singer(s)	Length
1.	"Sahi Galat"	King	2:49
2.	"Saath Hum Rahein"	Jubin Nautiyal	4:02
3.	"Drishyam 2 - Title Track"	Vijay Prakash, Usha Uthup	3:20
Total length:			10:11

== Release ==
In June 2022, the makers officially revealed the release date as 18 November 2022. Following its theatrical run, the film began streaming on Amazon Prime Video from 13 January 2023.

== Reception ==
=== Box office ===
Drishyam 2 earned ₹15.38 crore at the domestic box office on its opening day. On the second day, the film collected ₹21.59 crore, while on the third day it collected ₹27.17 crore taking the domestic weekend collection to ₹64.14 crore.

As of 26 January 2023 the film earned ₹240.54 crore (US$26 million) net in India. India overall gross collection is ₹286.36 crores and, overseas gross is ₹58.69 crores taking worldwide collection to ₹345.05 crore (US$37 million).

=== Critical response ===
Drishyam 2 received positive reviews from critics and audiences. On the review aggregator website Rotten Tomatoes, 70% of 10 critics' reviews are positive, with an average rating of 6.1/10.

Bollywood Hungama rated the film 4 out of 5 stars and termed the film a "paisa vasool experience" and also praised the performances and climax. Archika Khurana of The Times of India rated the film 3.5 out of 5 stars and wrote: "Drishyam 2 dishes out plenty of twists and turns to keep you hooked throughout, just like its predecessor. And the story of the Salgaokars will continue to remain in public memory". Rohit Bhatnagar of The Free Press Journal rated the film 3.5 out of 5 stars and wrote: "Drishyam 2 ticks almost every box on the checklist of a Bollywood film lover and makes it a great watch for massy cinephiles". Devesh Sharma of Filmfare rated the film 3.5 out of 5 stars and wrote: "Everything hinges on the performances and the entire cast has chipped in with their best efforts. Tabu looks the very picture of grief and angst. Akshaye Khanna is the new player in the field and his quirks and punch dialogue make you smile. The film rests squarely on Ajay Devgn's able shoulders".

Anna M. M. Vetticad of Firstpost rated the film 3.25 out of 5 stars. Offering a detailed comparison between the original Malayalam Drishyam 2 starring Mohanlal and this Hindi remake, she wrote: "This is an adaptation that, while faithfully reproducing Jeethu Joseph's story, gives us a flavour of the cultural setting to which it has been transplanted from Kerala and does things with the new location that mark a refreshing change from the resurgence of prejudice and community stereotyping witnessed in Bollywood in the last decade."

Shalini Langer of The Indian Express rated the film 3 out of 5 stars and wrote: "The Ajay Devgn-Akshaye Khanna-Tabu starrer very deftly picks up from where the two main protagonists, both fierce parents, left off in Drishyam. Its execution is not as smooth as the last time though". Sonil Dedhia of News 18 rated the film 3 out of 5 stars and wrote: "Drishyam 2 doesn't feel nearly as tense or urgent as it ought to, and its plot simply isn't as deliciously complex as it could’ve been. As a result, it's a watchable film, but not an unforgettable one". Anindita Mukherjee of India Today rated the film 2.5 out of 5 stars and wrote: "Ajay Devgn's Drishyam 2 has plenty of nail-biting moments but it will somewhere leave you missing 2015 film, Drishyam".

== Sequel ==
A sequel titled Drishyam: The Conclusion was announced in December 2025. Originally teased as a simulrelease to its Malayalam counterpart, it was later developed as a standalone final instalment to the Hindi franchise, with a different script and definitive climax.

The film was theatrically released on 2 October 2026, coinciding with Gandhi Jayanti, which was marketed as "Drishyam Day", a reference to a recurring alibi element in the franchise.

== Accolades ==
Year (Note: Refers to the year in which the ceremony was held.)	Award	Category	Recipient(s)	Result	Ref.
2023	23rd IIFA Awards	Best Film	Drishyam 2	Won	
2023	23rd IIFA Awards	Best Actor	Ajay Devgn	Nominated	
2023	23rd IIFA Awards	Best Supporting Actress	Tabu	Nominated	
2023	23rd IIFA Awards	Best Story (Adapted)	Aamil Keeyan Khan and Abhishek Pathak	Nominated	
2023	68th Filmfare Awards	Best Actor	Ajay Devgn	Nominated	
2023	68th Filmfare Awards	Best Editing	Sandeep Francis	Nominated	
2023	68th Filmfare Awards	Best Action	Amin Khatib	Nominated	
