= Kamlesh Sawant =

Indian actor (born 1974)

- Shantanu Bhamare (L) with Kamlesh Sawant (R) on Sets of (RED Hindi film)
- Occupation: Actor
- Years active: 2004–present

Kamlesh Sawant is an Indian actor who works in Hindi and Marathi films. He is best known for his roles in the films Khakee, Force, Bhoothnath Returns, and Drishyam, Drishyam: The Conclusion.

== Filmography ==
Year	Title	Role	Notes
2004	Khakee	Constable Kamlesh Sawant	
2004	Deewaar: Let's Bring Our Heroes Home	Nayyar	
2006	Family	Shekhar's friend	
2007	Ek Krantiveer: Vasudev Balwant Phadke		
2008	Mumbai Meri Jaan	Police Inspector	
2009	Mi Shivajiraje Bhosale Boltoy!	ACP Rege	Marathi film
2009	Jail		
2010	Aakhari Decision	Rajeev Chowdhary	
2010	Right Yaaa Wrong		
2010	City of Gold		Bilingual film
2011	And Gandhi Goes Missing	Teacher	
2011	Force	Inspector Kamlesh Sawant	
2012	Chakradhaar	Inspector Yadav	
2013	Hridayanath		Marathi film
2013	Narba Chi Wadi	Sattu Ramoshi	Marathi film
2014	Bhoothnath Returns	Police Inspector (as Kamlesh Tukaram Sawant)	
2015	Drishyam	SI Laxmikant Gaitonde	
2015	Dagadi Chawl	Inspector Kale	Marathi film
2016	Dongri Ka Raja	Siddhant Prabhu's Boss	
2016	Kaul Manacha		
2017	Thank U Vitthala	Vishwasrao	Marathi film
2017	Mala Kahich Problem Nahi		
2021	Koi Jaane Na	Police Inspector	
2022	Faas	Baliram	Marathi film
2022	Drishyam 2	SI Laxmikant Gaitonde	
2023	Non Stop Dhamaal	Inspector Gaitonde	
2024	Lek Asavi Tar Ashi		Marathi film
2024	Amhi Jarange		Marathi film
2024	Dharmarakshak Mahaveer Chhatrapati Sambhaji Maharaj	Siddhi Khairiyat	Marathi film
2025	Mukkam Post Devach Ghar		Marathi film
2025	Black, White & Gray - Love Kills		Web series on SonyLIV
2025	Mission Grey House		
2025	Udaipur Files	SHO Rajveer Singh	
2026	The India Story	Inspector Jagan	
2026	Drishyam: The Conclusion	SI Laxmikant Gaitonde	
