= Siddharth Shaw =

Indian actor (born 1999)

- Born: 12 February 1999 (age 27); Lucknow, India
- Education: B.Com from Delhi University
- Alma mater: Mayo College, Ajmer
- Known for: Actor
- Notable work: Do Gubbare, Love Aaj Kal 2020, Criminal Justice

Siddharth Shaw (born 12 February 1999) is an Indian actor known for his work in the Hindi Film Industry. Recently seen as Rohit the lead of character of Do Gubbare on Jio Cinema. He's also worked in Love Aaj Kal as Rathore, Rahul in Criminal Justice S3 and Sameer in Not Dating.

== Biography ==
Siddharth was born in Lucknow then raised in Delhi initially where he got to be a part of the Delhi Theatre Circuit in Mandi House. Then finished his schooling from Mayo College,Ajmer and received an undergraduate degree from Delhi University.

== Career ==
Siddharth has been an all rounder from his school days. While he was at Mayo College, Ajmer he held the prestigious posts of being the College Monitor, College Cultural Activities Captain, College Debating Captain, College Golf Captain and Model UN Secretary-general.

He was the first TedxYouthmayocollege licensee for his school and later went on to give a TedX Talk at TedxHRcollege in 2020. Not only co-curricularly inclined, Siddharth was awarded the Principal's Medal for Excellence in Academics for 4 consecutive years and also awarded the HH Mahrao Kotan Medal for Excellence in Dramatics when at school.

He was an active member of various theatre groups based in Delhi and acted in various stage productions (2004–19) including The Sound of Music, Charlie and The Chocolate Factory, Tin Soldier, The Venetian Twins, Charley's Aunt and Manto's Thanda Ghost and Boo.

He received a grade 4 degree in acting from Trinity College of Arts and trained at Adishakti Theatre Research Laboratory.

While he was only 19 years old, he got a break at the movies with Mr. Imtiaz Ali's Love Aaj Kal 2020 as Mr. Kartik Aaryan's friend.

== Works ==
- Rohit Shulka from Do Gubbare
- Rathore from Love Aaj Kal 2020
- Rahul from Criminal Justice S3
- Sameer from Not Dating
- Chorna - Chorna| Official Video | Imran Raza | Shamsul Hasan Shams | Nitin Jain | Envi Production Music
- Do Gubbare Video Jukebox- Do Gubbare (Video Jukebox) Saurabh Bhalerao | Abhay Jodhpurkar, Salil Charaya, Himani Kapoor
- Chiraiya (2026) as Arun Sukumar Bhramar – JioHotstar series
