= Bhateja =

Bhateja (ਭठेਜਾ) is a Jatt surname used in Punjab, India. Notable people with the surname include:

- Anchal Bhateja, Indian lawyer and disability rights advocate
- Noyrika Bhateja (born 1990), Indian actress and model
- Sita Bhateja (1930–2018), Indian gynaecologist and obstetrician
