= Devashish Makhija =

Indian filmmaker, artist, and writer

- Born: Kolkata, India
- Occupations: Filmmaker, Screenwriter, Graphic Artist, Fiction Writer, Poet
- Years active: 2004-present
- Known for: Ajji; Joram

Devashish Makhija is an Indian filmmaker, screenwriter, graphic artist, fiction writer and poet. He is best known for writing and directing the full-length feature films: Ajji, Oonga, and Bhonsle. He also authored the bestselling children's books, When Ali Became Bajrangbali and Why Paploo was Perplexed, along with a series of 49 short stories published as an anthology, Forgetting, published by HarperCollins. He has also worked on the films Black Friday and Bunty Aur Babli. He has also directed film Joram.

== Early life ==
Born and brought up in Park Circus, Devashish spent the first 24 years of his life in Kolkata. He completed his schooling at Don Bosco High School and pursued a degree in economics at St. Xavier's College. Following a brief stint in advertising with McCann Erickson and Mudra Kolkata after his graduation, Devashish arrived in Mumbai to pursue filmmaking.

== Career ==
Devashish Makhija began his career in the Indian film industry as a researcher and assistant director on the critically acclaimed film Black Friday (2004), a film based on the namesake book by Hussain Zaidi about the 1993 Bombay bombings, the feature-film directorial of Anurag Kashyap.

In the following year, he was also the chief assistant director to Shaad Ali on the blockbuster Bunty Aur Babli. Since then, he has written numerous screenplays, notably Avik Mukherjee's Bhoomi in the year 2008 and Anurag Kashyap's upcoming superhero project Doga. In addition to writing its story, screenplay and dialogue, Devashish made his feature-film directorial debut with the highly appreciated Hindi-Oriya film Oonga in 2013, starring Nandita Das, Seema Biswas, Salim Kumar and Raju Singh (as Oonga). Oonga made its world premiere at the New York Indian Film Festival on 3 May 2013 and was screened in the 'India Gold' competition section at the 15th Mumbai Film Festival, the 13th River to River. Florence Indian Film Festival and the Indian Film Festival at Melbourne in 2014. Oonga was also a part of the international competition at the International Film Festival of Kerala in 2014.

He has written and directed two acclaimed short films, Rahim Murge Pe Mat Ro, starring Piyush Mishra as the voice of Rahim Murga in 2008, followed by the film El'ayichi in 2015, starring Nimrat Kaur and Divyendu Sharma, which was chosen among the 5 short films exclusively screened at the 1st edition of the 'Terribly Tiny Talkies' initiative. He has also written and directed the short film Absent in 2015, starring Vikas Kumar which was produced by 'Pocket Films' and had an official selection at International Film Festival of South Asia (IFFSA), Toronto, Canada and New York Indian Film Festival

Apart from writing and directing films, he also made his debut as a graphic-poet in 2008 with Occupying Silence, a book of graphic verse. He has authored Tulika Publishers' bestselling children's books When Ali became Bajrangbali and Why Paploo was Perplexed. By Two, a crime noir story written by him, was featured in the omnibus Mumbai Noir which Akashic Books published in 2012 as part of their award-winning international Noir series. In early-2015, HarperCollins published a collection of 49 short stories written by Devashish across a variety of genres in the acclaimed anthology Forgetting.

His most recent feature film Bhonsle had its world premiere at the 23rd Busan International Film Festival and is now streaming on SonyLiv. He was recently a co-writer Pavan Kriplani's Bhoot Police, a horror-comedy starring Saif Ali Khan, Arjun Kapoor, and Yami Gautam. His upcoming feature, title Joram, stars Manoj Bajpayee and is being co-produced under his production house Makhijafilm.

== Reviews of his work ==
Of By Two, Kankana Basu of The Hindu said "'By Two' by Devashish Makhija, where the fates of twin brothers, Rahim and Rahman, resonate with the paradoxical nature of life in the teeming metropolis. The unique place of the humble auto-rickshaw in the bigger scheme of things could not have been driven home more exquisitely, as in this story". Aditi Seshadri wrote for the DNA, "..the stories that stand out are the ones that have the most authentic voice (like) 'By Two' by Devashish Makhija, a gritty story about twin auto-rickshaw drivers and what they do to survive in Mumbai." About his anthology Forgetting, one review said, "Infused with every aspect of emotion, big and small, this book is a complete eye opener that throws light on the reality of human lives that we sometimes tend to ignore." His debut as a graphic-poet with Occupying Silence was celebrated as "Brave and fresh", to quote Aparna Sen from the Indian Express.

Among the positive reviews his award-winning short film Rahim Murge Pe Mat Ro received, Kishore Budha from the Wide Screen Journal said, "Rahim Murge Pe Mat Ro is a fast, witty short with a great voiceover. And there's a message on animal welfare somewhere in there. A lesson in short filmmaking."

== Filmography ==
Year	Film	Credits
2005	Bunty Aur Babli	Assistant director
2007	Black Friday	Assistant director
2009	Bhoomi	Screenplay and dialogue writer
2010	Rahim Murge Pe Mat Ro	Writer, director
2013	Oonga	Director and story, screenplay and dialogue writer
2015	El'ayichi	Short film writer, director
2016	Taandav	Short film writer, director
2016	Absent	Short film writer, director
2017	Ajji	Awardered Singapore International Film Festival; Writer, director
2018	Bhonsle	Writer, director
2021	Cycle	Short film Writer, director
2021	Cheepatakadumpa	Short film Writer, director
2023	Joram	Writer, director
2026	Gandhari	Director

== Awards and nominations ==
List of Devashish Makhija awards and nominations
Year	Category	Nominated work	Result
Filmfare Awards
2024	Best Film (Critics)	Joram	Won
2024	Best Story	Joram	Won
