= Rajesh A Krishnan =

Film director

Rajesh Krishnan
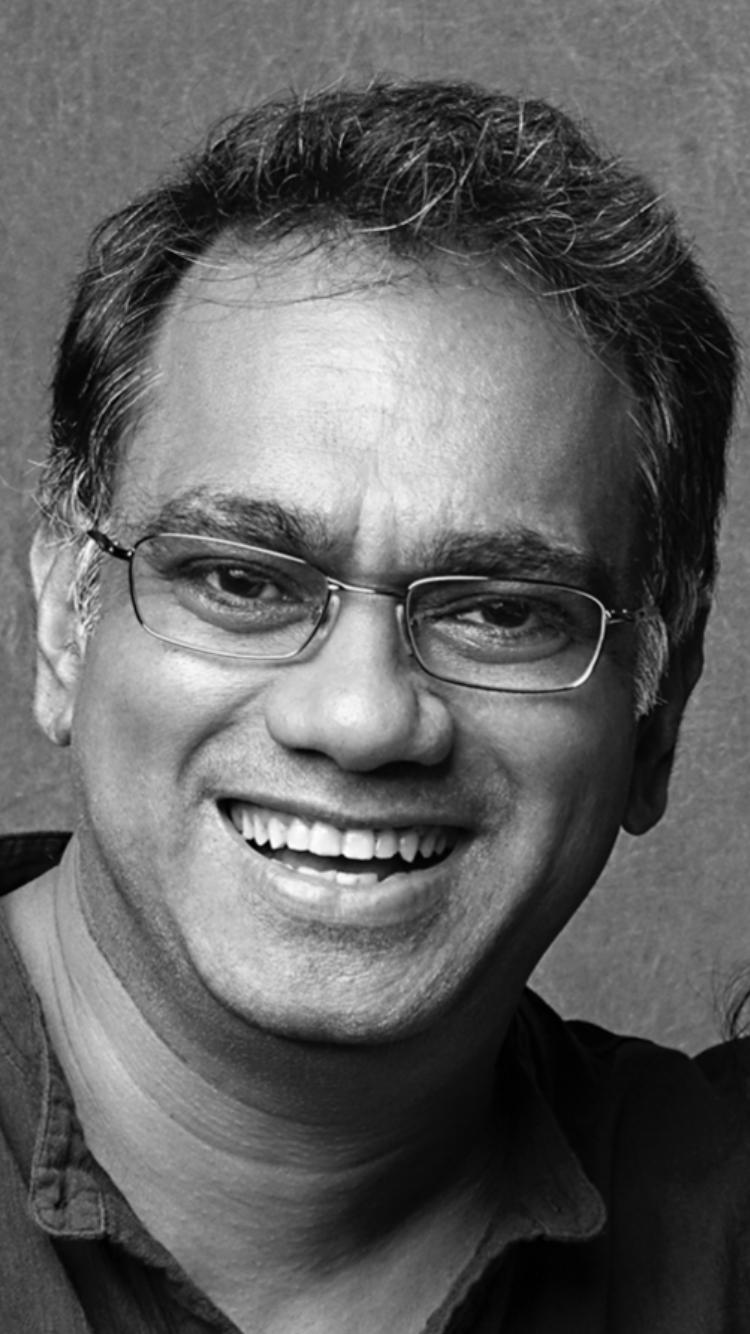
- Born: Mumbai, Maharashtra
- Education: Bachelors of Commerce; Post Graduate studies in Advertising and Communications
- Alma mater: Vivek Vidyalaya School; Shri Chinai College of Commerce & Economics; Narsee Monjee Institute of Management Studies
- Occupations: Filmmaker, screenwriter, producer
- Awards: 66th Filmfare Awards

Rajesh Krishnan is an Indian filmmaker, screenwriter and producer predominantly known for his work on various humor-based television commercials. He was born in Mumbai, Maharashtra. He made his directorial debut with Lootcase, a comedy thriller, for which he was awarded the Filmfare Award for Best Debut Director, at the 66th Filmfare Awards.

== Education ==
Rajesh was born into a Palakkad Iyer family and grew up in Mumbai. He did his schooling at Vivek Vidyalaya School in Goregaon and studied bachelor's in commerce from Shri Chinai College of Commerce & Economics. He finished his Post Graduate studies in Advertising and Communications at Narsee Monjee Institute of Management Studies in 1995.

== Career ==
Rajesh started his career as a copywriter and worked with agencies, including Contract, Enterprise Nexus and Ogilvy for five years. In 2007, he founded Soda Films along with producer Ameya Dahibavkar, an advertising production house based in Mumbai. Rajesh ventured into the OTT space by directing Tripling, a drama series, which was created by The Viral Fever and awarded the Asian Television Awards in the year 2017. In 2020, he co-wrote and directed Kunal Khemu and Rasika Dugal starrer Lootcase, for which he received two nominations for a Filmfare Award for Best Story and Best Screenplay; he also won an award for Best Debut Director on 27 March 2021.

== Filmography ==
=== Film ===
Year	Title	Director	Writer	Notes
2020	Lootcase	Yes	Yes	Also portrayed Classical singer
2024	Crew	Yes	No	

=== Television ===
Year	Title	Director	Writer	Notes
2016-2019	TVF Tripling	Yes	No	1st season; and portrayed Tharki uncle

== Awards and nominations ==
Film	Award	Category	Result	Ref
Lootcase	66th Filmfare Awards	Best Story	Nominated	
Lootcase	66th Filmfare Awards	Best Screenplay	Nominated	
Lootcase	66th Filmfare Awards	Best Debut Director	Won	
