= Noyrika Bhateja =

Indian actress and model

- Born: 1990 (age 35–36); Jaipur, Rajasthan, India
- Other names: Noyrika Bhatheja
- Occupations: Actress, model
- Years active: 2018–present
- Known for: Hit: The First Case, Jogi, Crew

Noyrika Bhateja (also spelled Noyrika Bhatheja) is an Indian–Iranian actress and model who works in Hindi and Tamil cinema, theatre, and web series. She has appeared in films such as Hit: The First Case (2022), Jogi (2022), and Crew (2024).

== Early life and education ==
Noyrika Bhateja was born in Jaipur, Rajasthan in 1990. She is of both Indian and Iranian descent and is fluent in Farsi, Hindi, and English. She studied at Fergusson College, Pune, earning a Bachelor of Science degree in Microbiology.

== Career ==
Bhateja began her theatre career in 2018 with the Asmita Theatre group in Delhi, training under theatre mentor Kulvinder Bakshish. She portrayed Krishna, along with eight other characters, in the national award-winning play KARN.

Her film credits include Hit: The First Case (2022), Jogi (2022) Crew (2024) and Karungaapiyam, a Tamil film.

Bhateja appeared in the short film Infected 2030, which released on Eros Now in May 2021.

== Filmography ==
=== Films ===
- Hit: The First Case (2022)
- Jogi (2022)
- Karungaapiyam (2023)
- Crew (2024)

=== Short films ===
- Infected 2030 (2021)

=== Web series ===
- Minus 1 (Part 2)
- Brochara (Season 2)
- Leaked!
- Shrikant Bashir
