= Kshay =

2012 Indian psychological drama film

- Film poster
- Directed by: Karan Gour
- Written by: Karan Gour
- Starring: Rasika Dugal; Alekh Sangal; Sudhir Pednekar
- Cinematography: Abhinay Khoparzi
- Edited by: Karan Gour
- Music by: Siddharth Bhatia; Karan Gour
- Production company: Empatheia Films
- Release date: 15 June 2012 (India)
- Running time: 92 minutes
- Country: India
- Language: Hindi

Kshay (Hindi: क्षय, Corrode) is a 2012 black-and-white independent Indian psychological drama film written and directed by Karan Gour. The film premiered on 8 October 2011 at the Chicago International Film Festival. It went on to win several international awards like the Jury Award at the Indian Film Festival of Los Angeles. It was released in theatres in India on 15 June 2012.

== Plot ==
A middle-class Indian housewife, Chhaya (Rasika Dugal) becomes obsessed with an expensive sculpture of the goddess Lakshmi and is determined to possess it despite the fact that she and her husband Arvind (Alekh Sangal) have little money.

== Cast ==
- Rasika Dugal as Chhaya
- Alekh Sangal as Arvind
- Sudhir Pednekar as Bapu
- Adityavardhan Gupta as Sculptor
- Nitika Anand as Shruti
- Ashwin Baluja as Jamil
- Siddharth Bhatia as Amay
- Shalini Gupta as Woman in Market
- Abhinay Khoparzi as Man on the Bus
- Madhav as Construction Worker
- Asit Redij as Asif
- Shazeb Shaikh as Electrician

== Production ==
The film was shot in Bhayandar, Mumbai on a low budget of ₹400,000 (US$4,200) over a period of four years, with a director and one member crew. The director Karan Gour used HDV and shot the film in color, later changing it to black and white in post-production.

== Release and reception ==
After its premiere on 8 October 2011 at the Chicago International Film Festival, the film travelled to festivals like Indian Film Festival of Los Angeles, and South Asian International Film Festival. The film later saw a limited release at PVR Cinemas multiplexes starting 15 June 2012, followed by a DVD release. In its year end review, Mint called the film an "assured debut" while adding the film to the "top films of 2012".

== Awards ==
- 2012 Jury Award for Best Feature at the Indian Film Festival of Los Angeles
- 2012 Asian New Talent Award for Best Film at the Shanghai International Film Festival
