= Powder (TV series) =

- Genre: Action; Crime
- Written by: Atul Sabharwal
- Directed by: Atul Sabharwal
- Starring: See below
- Composer: Vipin Mishra
- Country of origin: India
- Original language: Hindi
- No. of seasons: 1
- No. of episodes: 26

Production
- Producer: Aditya Chopra
- Cinematography: Karthik Ganesh
- Editor: Irene Dhar Malik
- Running time: 48 minutes
- Production company: YRF Television

Original release
- Network: Sony Entertainment Television
- Release: 3 January – 24 June 2010

Powder is an Indian crime television series which aired on Sony TV from 3 January 2010 to 24 June 2010.

== Plot ==
Powder is about the narcotics trade in Mumbai, and two men who are on the opposite ends of the law—superintendent of Police serving in the NCB (Narcotics Control Bureau) Usmaan Malik (Manish Choudhary) and Mumbai drug kingpin Naved Ansari (Pankaj Tripathi). Both Usmaan and Naved grew up in the slums of Mumbai and chose different paths that eventually put them in front of each other. The biggest challenge for Usmaan and his team at NCB is to connect Naved with any drug bust or evidence, mainly because Naved is a ghost who does not exist in any civil records. Naved on the other hand, while fending off the authorities off his back, also struggles to climb the political ladder of his own business. The show explores the basic human traits like greed, loyalty, power, friendship, love and betrayal—while showing how the drug trade and authorities function.

During the end of the series, a real life detective from DRI (Directorate of Revenue Intelligence), an institution that had also been portrayed in the series, applauded the makers for their tedious research work and steadfast allegiance to reality. The show was widely lauded for its storytelling and execution, but fell prey to low ratings and kept being pushed into the late night slots.

== Cast ==
- Manish Choudhary as Usmaan Ali Malik, the superintendent of the Narcotics Control Bureau, Mumbai.
- Pankaj Tripathi as Naved Ansari, the kingpin of the Mumbai drug scene
- Rasika Dugal as Rati
- Geetika Tyagi as Brinda Sawhney, new recruit who is the only female officer in the NCB
- Rahul Bagga as Mahendra Ranade, a young and tough NCB officer
- Shahab Khan as Mr. Joshi, an investigating officer
- Vikas Kumar as Umesh Jagdale
- Subrat Dutta as Bose
- Jagat Rawat as Raja
- Gaurav Sharma as Karthik Sharma
- Firoz Khursheed Khan as Khalid Qureshi
- Gagan Singh Sethi as Shiven Singh
