= Hamid (film) =

- Theatrical release poster
- Directed by: Aijaz Khan
- Written by: Ravinder Randhawa; Sumit Saxena
- Screenplay by: Ravinder Randhawa
- Based on: Phone No. 786 by Mohd. Amin Bhat
- Produced by: Siddharth Anand Kumar; Vikram Mehra
- Starring: Rasika Dugal; Vikas Kumar; Talha Arshad Reshi
- Cinematography: John Wilmor
- Edited by: Afzal Shaikh
- Music by: Andrew T. Mackay
- Production company: Yoodlee Films
- Distributed by: Saregama
- Release dates: 14 December 2018 (Smile International Film Festival for Children & Youth); 15 March 2019
- Running time: 108 minutes
- Country: India
- Language: Urdu
- Box office: est. ₹0.07 crore

Hamid is an Indian drama film directed by Aijaz Khan. The film stars Rasika Dugal, Vikas Kumar and Talha Arshad Reshi in major roles, and is an adaptation of the play Phone No. 786 by Mohd. Amin Bhat. The story revolves around a seven-year-old Hamid who learns that 786 is God's number and decides to try and reach out to God by dialing this number. He wants to talk to his father, who his classmate tells him has gone to Allah. One fine day the phone call is answered, and two lives shattered in the strife of Kashmir find a way to be complete again. The film is produced by Yoodlee Films, a venture of Saregama. The official trailer was released on 10 October 2018. Global premiere of Hamid was held at the Jio MAMI 20th Mumbai Film Festival. The film went on to win the National Film Award for Best Feature Film in Urdu at the 66th National Film Awards hosted in December 2019.

== Plot ==
Hamid is a young boy of seven, in search of his father who went missing a year ago. He somehow discovers that 786 is Allah's number, makes some combination and finally dials a phone number which is answered. Thus begins a series of conversations with the person on the other line who happens to be a CRPF soldier finding solace in Hamid's innocent talk. Hamid tells him about his father, his teachings and how his absence has changed their lives. Meanwhile, Hamid's mother is not able to make peace with the fact that her husband has disappeared. She is always lost in her grief and is dejected. Hamid tries to learn his father's boat-making craft among various other means to please Allah, in the belief that his father might return someday. Finally, on one of the days, Hamid realizes that his father is dead and would never return. His mother comes to terms with his death on the very same day. In the epilogue it is shown that Hamid finally gets his much-desired red paint for the newly designed boat (probably sent by the CRPF jawan), paints it and sails on it with his mother.

The film denotes how eventually, people learn to deal with tragedies and move on, no matter what, and serves as a powerful depiction of human resilience. What is striking is also the fact that despite being naive, the boy knows the difference between what is right and what is wrong due to his father's teachings, again stressing the fact that we are a result of our upbringing.

== Cast ==
- Talha Arshad Reshi as Hamid
- Vikas Kumar as Abhay
- Rasika Dugal as Ishrat
- Sumit Kaul as Rehmat
- Mir Sarwar as Abbass
- Bashir Lone as Rasool Chacha
- Veer Rajwant Singh as Rajinder
- Ashraf Nagoo as Basheer
- Qazi Faiz as Beggar
- Umar Adil as Police Officer
- Gulam Hussain Barji as Shopkeeper
- Sajid as Police Constable
- Shafia as Noor

== Marketing and release ==
The theatrical release poster of the film was released on 11 February 2019 giving the release date as 1 March 2019. The release date was pushed back to 15 March 2019.

The trailer of the film was released on 10 October 2018. It has 7.3 million views on YouTube since its release.

== Home media ==
The film was made available for streaming on Netflix in May 2019.

== Reception ==
The Hollywood Reporter finds the film sobering yet hopeful account of compassion emerging in the midst of conflict. Kunal Guha writing for Bangalore Mirror gives three stars out of five and feels that the film successfully managed to subliminally highlight the sentiments of Kashmiris without turning the film into a political statement. He calls it the biggest victory of the film.

Anupam Verma of Firstpost gave the film three stars out of five and stated "Hamid is a beautiful story whose translation to the screen is delivered with wildly different results throughout its run-time." Deccan Chronicle rated 3.5 out of 5 stars and found it to be "A well-told story of human perseverance and frailty."

Writing in The Hindu Namrata Joshi says "Hamid has a simplicity, humaneness and a sense of poise that is profoundly moving."

== Accolades ==
Award (Note: Awards, festivals and organizations are in alphabetical order.)	Date of ceremony (Note: Date is linked to the article about the awards held that year, wherever possible.)	Category	Recipient(s)	Result	Ref.
Critics' Choice Film Awards	28 March 2020	Best Writing	Aijaz Khan; Ravinder Randhawa; Sumit Saxena	Nominated	
Fajr International Film Festival	1–11 February 2019	Trophy and Diploma of Honor for Muhammad Al-Ameen Award	Aijaz Khan	Won	
National Film Awards	23 December 2019	Best Feature Film in Urdu	Director: Aijaz Khan; Production House: Saregama India Limited	Won	
National Film Awards	23 December 2019	National Film Award for Best Child Artist	Talha Arshad Reshi	Won	
Rajasthan International Film Festival	23 January 2019	Best Director for Hndi Feature Film	Aijaz Khan	Won	
Rajasthan International Film Festival	23 January 2019	Best Actor in Hndi Feature Film	Rasika Dugal	Won	
UK Asian Film Festival	7 April 2019	Best Film	Aijaz Khan	Won	
UK Asian Film Festival	7 April 2019	Best Actor	Rasika Dugal	Won	
