= Oonga (film) =

- Poster
- Directed by: Devashish Makhija
- Screenplay by: Devashish Makhija; Harish Amin
- Story by: Devashish Makhija; Sarat Talluri Rao
- Produced by: Harish Amin; Mehvash Husain
- Starring: Nandita Das; Seema Biswas; Salim Kumar
- Cinematography: Jehangir Choudhary
- Music by: Krsna
- Release date: 3 May 2013 (New York Indian Film Festival)
- Running time: 98 minutes
- Country: India
- Languages: Hindi, Oriya

Oonga is a Hindi and Oriya film directed by Devashish Makhija, and produced by Speaking Tree Pictures & Moo Print Pictures. It is a story of a little adivasi boy's obsession with becoming Rama, set against the backdrop of corrupt land mining activities threatening to destroy his village and the civil strife it leads to. The film stars Nandita Das, Seema Biswas, Salim Kumar and Raju Singh (as Oonga).

Oonga had its world premiere at the New York Indian Film Festival on 3 May 2013; and was screened in the 'India Gold' section at the 15th Mumbai Film Festival; the 13th River to River Florence Indian film festival 2013 and the Indian film festival at Melbourne 2014. Oonga is also a part of the international competition at the International Film Festival of Kerala 2014.

== Plot ==
Little adivasi Oonga misses his village school trip to see the ‘Ramayana’. Upset about being the only kid in his tribal village Pottacheru who has not yet seen the mythical warrior-king ‘Rama’, Oonga runs away, embarking on a long adventurous journey to the big city of Lohabad.

Oonga braves his way across forests, rivers and roads, hitching stolen rides on cars past valleys dug up for industrialization... along under-construction highways... until he reaches Lohabad. This world is much larger, brighter and faster than where he came from. After being denied entry he sneaks in to watch the play.

He is stunned to see that Rama is everything that the adivasi are - gentle, brave, a forest dweller and protector of mother-earth Sita. Except, he is also blue! Oonga gapes in awe as this blue hero saves Sita from the demon king Ravana.

When he emerges after the play, Oonga believes he has become Rama! Painted blue, he returns to Pottacheru, unaware that he is now returning not to the home he left behind, but to a battlefield where the ‘company’ will do anything to take the adivasi's land away from them to mine it for Bauxite.

As the Naxalite rebels and the CRPF soldiers go to war over Pottacheru, little Oonga, in his Rama avatar, believes he can save his home from this Ravana seeking to ravage it.

== Cast ==
- Nandita Das as Hemla
- Seema Biswas as Laxmi
- Alyy Khan as Manoranjan
- Salim Kumar as Kunja/Tramp
- Vipin Sharma as Pradip
- Anand Tiwari as Sushil
- Priyanka Bose as Oongamma
- Raju Singh (Debut)as Oonga

== Production and development ==
The idea for Oonga came to Devashish Makhija from a journey through the tribal belt of South Orissa and North Andhra with the photo-journalist Javed Iqbal, and documentary filmmaker Faiza Ahmad Khan. The film was shot on a limited budget, on a tight schedule of 18 days.

The story of Oonga found its seed in a small anecdote Devashish Makhija heard while in Koraput, Orissa. He recalls Sharanya Nayak, the local head of Action Aid there telling him how she had taken a group of adivasis to watch a dubbed version of Avatar (2009) . They hollered and cheered the Na’vi right through the film as if they were their own fellow-tribals, fighting the same battles they were.

Most of what is shown in the film is based on real incidents Makhija had witnessed or heard or read of. The character of Hemla was "inspired in part by the case of Soni Sori". About a fortnight before the filming of the abduction scene, in Koraput, Orissa, an adivasi MLA was actually kidnapped from a spot very near to the location for the planned shoot.

Oonga was shot as a bilingual film, and both Oriya and Hindi is spoken in the film. The actors playing Naxalites and the CRPF were from Mumbai, and the actors playing the adivasis were from Orissa, while Nandita Das speaks both languages.

== Critical reception ==
The film received several favourable reviews.

Josh Hurtado of Twitch Film described the film as "a complicated tale of a complicated existence in a place where simplicity still reigns" and praised the beauty of the Indian landscape in the film. Louis Proyect of the New York Indian Film Festival called it "the first film I have seen out of India that takes up the cause of the Adivasi."

Arnesh Ghose of Man's World praised the cinematography and music, and commented favourably on Raju Singh's performance, while Saibal Chaterjee from Civil Society Online said that the film "is remarkably free from the good-versus-evil narrative dynamics that define mainstream Hindi cinema."

Deborah Young of The Hollywood Reporter said that Oonga "does a pretty good job explaining why the regional police and the Naxalites, Maoist-inspired guerrillas coming from native tribes, are in a standoff in modern India"; she also praised the cinematography and the actors.
