= Puru Chibber =

Indian television actor

- Born: 22 August 1990 (age 35); Delhi, India
- Other name: Hameer Rizvi
- Occupation: Actor
- Years active: 2010–present
- Spouse: Roshni Banthia (m. 2019)
- Mother: Vibha Chibber

Puru Chibber is an Indian television actor best known for playing the role of Hameer Rizvi in Yash Raj Films' crime drama Khotey Sikkey on Sony TV and Sachin Deshmukh in television show Pavitra Rishta. He also starred in the movies Band Baaja Baaraat and Bhoomi.

He was also seen portraying the roles of Rocky Singh in Beintehaa, Karan in Do Dil Bandhe Ek Dori Se, and Ketan Mehta in Naamkarann.

== Personal life ==
Chibber was born on 22 August 1990 in New Delhi, and is son of actress Vibha Chibber, who was seen in the serial Bidaai and Mrs. Kaushik Ki Paanch Bahuein. In 2019 he married his longtime girl friend Roshni Banthia. They have a child.

== Career ==
Chibber played the role of Hameer Rizvi, the son of an owner of a pharmaceutical company and expert in gambling, in Khotey Sikkey which is about five rich youngsters and one stubborn cop who manages to solve various crimes in an unorthodox manner but emerges victorious.

He was also seen in the 2010 movie Band Baaja Baraat, in which he played the role of Bittoo's (Ranveer Singh) best friend. He has also worked in the movies Choo Lenge Akash and The Warrior. He was in Ekta Kapoor's show Pavitra Rishta on Zee TV, as Sachin Deshmukh. He was also seen in the show Beintehaa as Rocky Singh and Do Dil Bandhe Ek Dori Se as Karan. He plays the role of Ketan Mehta in the Star Plus show Naamkaran. He plays the role of SP Abhay Anand in the OTT (Sonyliv) Web Series Love J Action.

== Filmography ==
=== Television ===
Year	Title	Role	Notes	Ref.
2011	Khotey Sikkey	Hameer Rizvi		
2011–2012	Pavitra Rishta	Sachin "Sachu" Deshmukh		
2014	Do Dil Bandhe Ek Dori Se	Karan		
2014	Beintehaa	Rocky Singh		
2014–2015	Box Cricket League 1	Contestant		
2015	Reporters	Rony		
2016	Box Cricket League 2	Contestant		
2016–2017	Naamkarann	Ketan Mehta		
2022	Sab Satrangi	Deepu Maurya		
2024–present	Udne Ki Aasha	Tejas Deshmukh		

==== Special appearances ====
Year	Title	Role	Ref.
2010	Rishta.com	Mihir	
2012	Gumrah – End Of Innocence		
2014	Yeh Hai Aashiqui	Raghav	
2014	Pyaar Tune Kya Kiya	Chandu	
2015	Adaalat	Tara Singh	
2026	Mr. and Mrs. Parshuram	Tejas Deshmukh	
2026	Sairaab	Tejas Deshmukh	

=== Movies ===
- 2001 : Choo Lenge Akash
- 2001 : The Warrior
- 2010 : Band Baaja Baraat Sunny (Bittoo's best friend)
- 2015 : Meinu Ek Ladki Chaahiye
- 2016 : A Scandall
- 2017 : Bhoomi

=== Web series ===
- 2021 : Love J Action as SP Abhay Anand
