= Sukhmani Sadana =

Indian writer and actress (b. 1990)

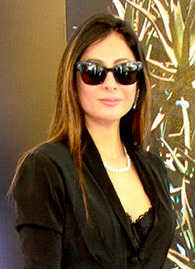
- Sadana in 2020
- Occupations: Actor, Writer, Screenplay writer
- Years active: 2010–present

Sukhmani Sadana is an Indian writer and actress from Amritsar. She is the editor-in-chief of a digital magazine called F.A.C.E. She played the role of Uttara Bakshi in the TV series Khotey Sikkey that aired on Sony Entertainment Television.

== Early life ==
Sadana attended Welham Girls' School, Dehradun and graduated from Lady Shri Ram College, Delhi University. She also studied at St. Xavier's College, Mumbai, Mumbai.

== Career ==
She worked as a copywriter in Ogilvy, Mumbai writing ads for brands such as Vodafone.

== Filmography ==
=== Films ===
Year	Title	Role	Notes	Ref.
2011	Ishq Holiday	Payal		
2018	Manmarziyaan	Lovely Singh		

=== Television ===
Year	Title	Role	Notes	Ref.
2014	Ishq Kills	Sabrina Fernandes	Episode 13	
2011	Khotey Sikkey	Uttara Bakshi		

=== Web series ===
Year	Title	Role	Notes	Ref.
2018	The Story			
2019	Parchhayee	Suzie		
2019	Sacred Games	Mikki (Bunty's sister)		
2021	Tandav	Divya Ahluwalia, Doctor		
2022	The Broken News	Arunima Sanyal		
2022	Tanaav	Nusrat Farooqui		

=== As writer ===
Year	Title	Notes
2012	Kyaa Super Kool Hain Hum	Dialogue revisor
2013	Horror Story	Dialogue writer
2014	Creature 3D	Screenplay
2016	1920 London	Screenplay
2018	Phir Se...	Dialogue/ Screenplay
2022	Rocketry: The Nambi Effect	Additional screenplay writer
2022	Jogi	Co-writer
