= Fleeting Beauty =

- The film's poster
- Directed by: Virginia Pitts
- Written by: Shuchi Kothari
- Produced by: Sarina Pearson; Shuchi Kothari
- Starring: Nandita Das; Will Wallace
- Cinematography: Simon Raby
- Edited by: Eric de Beus
- Music by: Tom Bailey
- Distributed by: Nomadz Unlimited
- Release date: 2004
- Running time: 10 minutes
- Country: New Zealand
- Language: English

Fleeting Beauty is a 2004 Independent short film directed by Virginia Pitts, a lecturer of Waikato University. The film stars Nandita Das and Will Wallace in the lead. The film is about the story of an immigrant Indian woman and her white lover in New Zealand. The film attempts to explore the colonial history of the Indian subcontinent.

== Plot ==
The story is about an Indian immigrant woman who explores the history of Indian subcontinent through spice routes on her white lover's back. She narrates him the story supported by many facts and figures with a blend of colonial history and spices. In due course of time, she ends up with a delicate portrait on her lover's back before it gets brushed off in a few minutes.

== Cast ==
- Nandita Das as Seema (Indian woman)
- Will Wallace as Chris (Seema's white lover)

== Production ==
The film was written by Shuchi Kothari and jointly produced by Sarina Pearson and Shuchi Kothari—both are lecturers at the Department of film, Television, and Media Studies, University of Auckland. It was also production debut of the latter. Before producing the film she has written screenplays for films produced in New Zealand, United States of America and India. The film, shot completely in New Zealand was rejected by the Film Commission and Creative New Zealand, the national arts development agency of the New Zealand, as they felt it lacked "New Zealand content".

== Reception ==
The film was premiered at various film festivals like the International Film Festival of Kerala, Valladolid International Film Festival, Festival des Films du Monde (Montreal) and New Zealand International Film Festival in 2004.

The film's screening at the Valladolid International Film Festival helped the producers receive funds from the Film Commission, New Zealand for its post-production work.

== Awards and nominations ==
49th Valladolid International Film festival
Nominated

- Golden Spike Award (Non-feature film)
- Silver Spike Award (Non-feature film)
