= Khotey Sikkey =

- Genre: Crime
- Created by: Vinay Choudary
- Directed by: Siddharth Anand Kumar, Jijy Philip
- Starring: See below
- Country of origin: India
- Original language: Hindi
- No. of seasons: 1
- No. of episodes: 25

Production
- Producer: Aditya Chopra
- Editor: Khushboo Agarwal Raj
- Camera setup: Multi-camera
- Running time: 52 minutes
- Production company: YRF Television

Original release
- Network: Sony Entertainment Television
- Release: 28 January – 23 April 2011

Khotey Sikkey (transl. Fake Coins) is a crime television series that aired on Sony TV. It premiered on 28 January 2011. The show revolves around an unlikely gang of five privileged youngsters and one stubborn cop. The group researches the crime activities in Mumbai. The series produced by Yash Raj Films.

== Cast ==
- Vikas Kumar as Senior Inspector Damodar Deshmukh
- Hasan Zaidi as Mohit Kishenchandani
- Mark Farokh Parakh as Ayush Khetarpal
- Puru Chibber as Hameer Rizvi
- Sukhmani Sadana as Uttara Bakshi
- Dilkhush Reporter as Dilnaz Shroff
- Adhyay Bakshi as Inspector Patil
- Amit Jain as Vivaan Bakshi
- Sumona Chakravarti as Anjali
- Nivaan Sen as Amol
- Olivier Lafont as Commodore Farokh
- Mia Uyeda
