= Out of Love (Indian TV series) =

Indian web series streaming on Disney+ Hotstar

- Poster
- Genre: Thriller drama
- Created by: Mike Bartlett
- Based on: Doctor Foster by Mike Bartlett
- Written by: Suyash Trivedi; Abhiruchi Chand; Preeti Mamgain; Rajesh Chadha; Mike Bartlett
- Directed by: Tigmanshu Dhulia; Aijaz Khan; Oni Sen
- Starring: Rasika Dugal; Purab Kohli; Meenakshi Chaudhary; Soni Razdan
- Composer: Sameer Phaterpekar
- Country of origin: India
- Original language: Hindi
- No. of seasons: 2
- No. of episodes: 10

Production
- Executive producers: Rajesh Chadha; Manisha Mudgal; Pragati Deshmukh
- Producers: Myleeta Aga; Sameer Gogate
- Production location: India
- Cinematography: Harendra Singh
- Editors: Abhijeet Deshpande; Sourabh Prabhudesai
- Production companies: BBC Studios India; Hotstar Specials

Original release
- Network: Hotstar
- Release: 22 November 2019 – 21 May 2021

Related
- Doctor Foster

Out of Love is an Indian thriller drama television series based on Doctor Foster by Mike Bartlett adapted by Hotstar for its label Hotstar Specials. It is directed by Tigmanshu Dhulia and Aijaz Khan starring Rasika Dugal and Purab Kohli in lead roles. It premiered on Hotstar from 22 November 2019. The series was renewed for a season 2 of which the first two of five episodes aired on 30 April 2021 with the final episode being aired on 21 May 2021.

== Cast ==
- Rasika Dugal as Dr. Meera Kapoor
- Purab Kohli as Akarsh Kapoor
- Soni Razdan as Mrs. Kapoor, Akarsh's mother
- Meenakshi Chaudhary as Alia Kapoor (née Kashyap)
- Aanjjan Srivastav as Dr. Pradhan
- Sanghmitra Hitaishi as Mandira Pillai
- Ekavali Khanna as Kalpana Kashyap
- Harsh Chhaya as Kartik Kashyap
- Kabir Kachroo as Abhishek Kapoor (Abhi), Meera and Akarsh’s son
- Disha Thakur as Shalini
- Vishwas Kini as Rohan
- Eisha Chopra as Payal
- Suhaas Ahuja as Vidyut Mehra
- Himanshi Choudhry as Ritu Mehra
- Virhi Kodvara as Ahaana Kapoor, Alia and Akarsh's daughter

== Premise ==
Meera and Akarsh have been happily married until one day Meera finds a hair on Akarsh's scarf. Meera becomes obsessed with finding out who Akarsh's mistress is. She finally confides in a friend who asks her to behave normally around Akarsh but continues digging for evidence. The show traces how Meera discovers Akarsh's lies, his affair with a much younger woman Alia and how she navigates her marriage.

== Production ==
In October 2019, Variety reported that Hotstar would be adapting BBC Studios's critically acclaimed series Doctor Foster for Indian audiences in association with BBC Studios India with Tigmanshu Dhulia and Aijaz Khan helming the series. By early November 2019, Hotstar revealed Rasika Dugal and Purab Kohli as lead actors.

It was announced that the series will be coming back with a season 2. The trailer of season 2 was unveiled on 21 April 2021

== Episodes ==
List of episodes
Episode No. (Overall)	Episode No. (in Season)	Title	Director	Written by	Original Release date
Season 1
1	1	The Seed	Tigmanshu Dhulia	Suyash Trivedi Abhiruchi Chand	22 November 2019
2	2	The Outsider	Tigmanshu Dhulia	Suyash Trivedi Abhiruchi Chand	22 November 2019
3	3	More than Meets the Eyes	Aijaz Khan	Suyash Trivedi Abhiruchi Chand	22 November 2019
4	4	A Second Chance	Aijaz Khan	Suyash Trivedi Abhiruchi Chand	22 November 2019
5	5	Stop At Nothing	Aijaz Khan	Suyash Trivedi Abhiruchi Chand	22 November 2019
Season 2
6	1	The Return	Oni Sen	Preeti Mamgain Eisha Chopra	30 April 2021
7	2	Empty Nest	Oni Sen	Preeti Mamgain	30 April 2021
8	3	Wicked Games	Oni Sen	Preeti Mamgain	7 May 2021
9	4	Once a Cheater, Always a Cheater	Oni Sen	Preeti Mamgain	14 May 2021
10	5	Collateral Damage	Oni Sen	Rajesh Chadha	21 May 2021

== Release ==
The series was launched on 22 November 2019 on Hotstar.

=== Promotion ===
The first trailer of the series was released by Hotstar on 1 November 2019 across multiple platforms.

== Reception ==
The series garnered largely positive reviews.

Ruchi Kaushal of Hindustan Times praised the way the series adapted to the Indian setting despite being a remake and called it one of Dugal's best works till date with strong writing and backed by Tigamanshu Dhulia's direction.

On the other hand, the series was also described as a banal take on infidelity by some others.
