= Court Room – Sachchai Hazir Ho =

Indian television series

- Genre: Drama; Crime
- Created by: Vipul D Shah
- Directed by: Kedar Shinde
- Country of origin: India
- Original language: Hindi
- No. of seasons: 1
- No. of episodes: 27

Production
- Running time: 45 Minutes approx.
- Production company: Optimystix Entertainment

Original release
- Network: Colors TV
- Release: 9 February – 5 May 2019

Court Room – Sachchai Hazir Ho (transl. Court Room – Is The Truth Present?) is an Indian Hindi-language television series based on law and crime produced by Optimystix Entertainment. It premiered on 9 February 2019 on Colors TV and is hosted by Vikas Kumar.

== Plot ==
The series revolves around different crimes and their jurisdiction. The series is inspired by the real cases put forward in the court. It deals the problems of name changing, cold murder and gives logical insights into the cases.

== Cast ==
- Vikas Kumar as Host
- Sanjeev Tyagi as Advocate
- Nissar Khan as Advocate
- Rushad Rana
- Bhuvnesh Shetty

== Episodes ==
Episode No.	Telecast Date	Title
1.	9 February 2019	State Vs Vicky Chaudhary
2.	10 February 2019	State Vs Vicky Chaudhary - Part 2
3.	16 February 2019	State Vs residents of Indira Nagar
4.	17 February 2019	State Vs Geeta Jagtap - Part 2
5.	23 February 2019	State Vs Nikhil Bhonsle
6.	24 February 2019	State vs Nikhil Bhonsle - Part 2
7.	2 March 2019	Supriya Gupta vs The Upholder Publication
8.	2 March 2019	Supriya Gupta vs The Upholder Publication- Part 2
9.	3 March 2019	Aarti Pal murder case
10.	9 March 2019	Barkha Patel murder case
11.	10 March 2019	Rekha Arora murder case
12.	16 March 2019	A heinous crime!
13.	17 March 2019	The missing witness
14.	23 March 2019	Asif Quadri murder case
15.	24 March 2019	Asif Quadri murder case - Part 2
16.	30 March 2019	A marital conspiracy
17.	31 March 2019	A marital conspiracy - Part 2
18.	6 April 2019	A property dispute
19.	7 April 2019	Brutal murder of an innocent child!
20.	13 April 2019	Mysterious case of honour killing!
21	14 April 2019	Mysterious case of honour killing - Part 2
22.	20 April 2019	A case of mistaken identities
23.	21 April 2019	A twisted dowry case
24.	27 April 2019	The spelling mistake!
25.	28 April 2019	The spelling mistake Part-2
26.	4 May 2019	The serial criminal of Delhi
27.	5 May 2019	The serial criminal of Delhi Part- 2

== Rating ==
The show earned poor ratings due to its timeslot hence it went off air on May 5, 2019.
