= Karungaapiyam =

2023 Indian horror thriller film

- Theatrical release poster
- Directed by: Deekay
- Written by: Deekay
- Produced by: Padarthi Padmaja
- Starring: Kajal Aggarwal; Regena Cassandrra; Janani Iyer; Raiza Wilson; Kalaiyarasan; Yogi Babu
- Cinematography: Vignesh Vasu
- Edited by: Vijay Velukutty
- Music by: Prasad SN
- Production company: Pave Entertainments
- Distributed by: Blockbuster Production; I Creation; Uthraa Productions
- Release date: 19 May 2023
- Country: India
- Language: Tamil

Karungaapiyam (transl. Black novel) is a 2023 Indian Tamil-language horror thriller film written and directed by Deekay and produced by Padarthi Padmaja. The flm features an ensemble cast including Kajal Aggarwal, Regena Cassandrra, Janani Iyer, Raiza Wilson, Kalaiyarasan, Yogi Babu, Karunakaran, John Vijay, Shah Ra, and Aadhav Kannadasan. The film was released on 19 May 2023 to negative reviews from critics.

== Plot ==
During the COVID-19 lockdown, Umayaal grows weary of confinement and decides to visit her friend Priya’s brother Anand’s private library. There, she discovers an ancient, dust-covered book titled Karungaapiyam. Intrigued by its age yet surprised that its stories seem set in the modern day, Umayaal begins to read, unaware that the book will soon consume her own reality.

=== Story 1: Karu Naakkukaari (The woman with the jinxed tongue) ===
Meera, a woman evicted by her landlord during the pandemic, takes refuge with her friend Shakthi. When her landlord suddenly dies after an argument with his wife (exactly as Meera had once cursed), she fears her words have a deadly power. Other “coincidental” deaths further convince her that her curses come true. However, Shakthi is hiding darker secrets: she discovers a corpse in his apartment and realizes he is a kidnapper and murderer. Haunted by the ghosts of his victims (including Meera herself, revealed to have died five years earlier), Shakthi faces the vengeful spirits of those he wronged.

=== Story 2: Kathara Kathara Kajal (Kajal screamed her throat hoarse) ===
Kajal, a seemingly normal woman, is approached by YouTuber Prasanna for a lockdown interview. His curiosity turns to horror as he realises Kajal’s deranged obsession with cleanliness masks a gruesome secret. She kidnaps and mutilates men, cutting off their fingers to cook them into biriyani. Prasanna becomes her latest victim, and when another vlogger, Naran, arrives to review her home, he too discovers the grisly truth, but it is too late.

In the present, Umayaal begins to feel an eerie presence in the library and is unnerved by how lifelike the stories feel. When she checks the book for an author’s name, she finds it faded beyond recognition.

=== Story 3: Kummiruttu (Pitch darkness) ===
Director Jacob and singer Shruthi visit composer Siddharth Abhimanyu, known for plagiarising famous songs. Every time Shruthi sings, Siddharth hears curses that no one else can. During a blackout, they encounter a ghostly woman lamenting her lost family and a mysterious tea vendor who serves them vadas from his head. The group realises they are surrounded by spirits: victims of a car crash Siddharth caused while drunk driving. By morning, Siddharth’s death is confirmed on the news, revealing that he and the ghosts were already dead.

In the present, Umayaal sees visions of the same woman from the story, along with Kajal’s ghost, wielding a knife. She researches the characters and discovers real-life news articles about them, blurring the line between fiction and reality.

=== Story 4: Kaathuvaakula Rendu Bottle (Two bottles in a breeze) ===
Saravanan and his friend Paambu, desperate for alcohol during the lockdown, find a haunted bar inhabited by spectral beings and a mysterious alien leader named Sarakkalaya. She explains that the “ghosts” are aliens trapped on Earth, feeding on alcohol for survival. Through surreal tests, Saravanan learns that humanity’s true strength lies in emotion and compassion. The aliens depart, leaving the men spiritually transformed.

When Umayaal encounters Sarakkalaya and the aliens in the library, they tell her their existence is tied to hers before vanishing.

=== Story 5: Sooniyakkaari (Sorceress) ===
Set during the British Raj, Karthika is a benevolent village woman believed to have divine power: whatever she writes comes true. When mysterious murders plague her village, her greedy brother-in-law Arunachalam, her servant Pandi, and the corrupt priest Namboothri conspire to accuse her of witchcraft and seize her wealth. Her tongue is cut off, and the villagers execute her. Karthika’s spirit returns to avenge her killers and protect her daughter, Umayaal.

Shaken, the modern-day Umayaal finishes the final story and flees the library as paranormal events unfold around her. At home, Priya helps her uncover that Karungaapiyam’s author was “Umayaal Karthika”, her own full name. Priya theorizes that Umayaal is the reincarnation of Karthika and has inherited her supernatural abilities. To test it, Umayaal writes about a murderous Santa Claus with an axe and a bell in each hand who will chase her. When nothing happens, they laugh it off, until Umayaal turns around to see a Santa Claus approaching, axe and bell in hand.

== Cast ==
- Kajal Aggarwal as Karthika (Voice dubbed by Deepa Venkat)
- Regena Cassandrra as Karthika aka Umayal Karthika (Voice dubbed by Deepa Venkat)
- Janani as Kajal
- Raiza Wilson as Meera Krishnakumar
- Noyrika Bhatheja as Sarakkalaya, alien mother
- Kalaiyarasan as Shakthi
- Yogi Babu as "Pacha Satta" Naran
- Karunakaran as Pastor David
- Lollu Sabha Manohar as Siddharth Abhimanyu, music composer
- John Vijay as Kasi aka Annachi
- Aadhav Kannadasan as Arunachalam
- Kutty Gopi as Swiggy boy (in Kathara Kathara Kajal) & Paambu alias Nagaraj (in Kaathuvaakula Rendu Bottle)
- TSK as Saravanan
- Stunt Silva as Meera's landlord
- Don Ashok as Pandian, servant
- Shah Ra as Jacob, film director
- VJ Parvathy as Shruthi, singer
- Abishek Raaja as "It Is That Is" Prasanna
- VJ Ashiq as Anand
- Sherlin Seth as Priya
- Mohan Vaidya as Kajal's neighbor
- Pugazh as Dheena, tea vendor
- Haripriya Isai as Red Saree Girl (in Kummiruttu)
- Mirnalini Achan as Umayal
- Gokul as Aadhik
- Mohan as Singh
- Rajammal as Nagaraj's grandmother
- Chandrasekhar as Sadasivam, lawyer
- Vishnu as Namboothri

== Production ==
The film was directed by Deekay, also known as D. Karthikeyan. It is the second collaboration between Kajal Aggarwal and the director Deekay after Kavalai Vendam. The film was produced by Padarthi Padmaja under the banner of Pave Entertainments.The film was shot in Chennai, Udumalaipettai, and Pollachi. The film's cinematography was done by Vignesh Vasu in his second collaboration with the director ater Kaatteri. The editing of the film was done by Vijay Velukutty.

== Music ==
The music for the film was composed by S. N. Prasad in his third collaboration with Deekay after Yaamirukka Bayamey and Kaatteri.

== Release ==
The film was originally scheduled to release on 7 April 2023, but was postponed, and it was released theatrically on 19 May 2023.

== Reception ==
Chandhini R of Cinema Express gave the film a rating of 1.5/5, stating, "All the episodes have some horror elements of sorts but they are hardly inventive." Thanthi TV critic gave mixed reviews.
