= Meinu Ek Ladki Chaahiye =

- Directed by: Abhishek Bindal
- Written by: Shekhar Kochgaven; Abhishek Bindal
- Produced by: Manoj Bindal; Santosh Bindal
- Starring: Raghubir Yadav; Puru Chibber; Reecha Sinha; Rashee; Zakir Hussain
- Cinematography: K.V. Ramanna
- Edited by: Swaminath Pandey
- Music by: Ravi Pawar; Shadab Bharti; Avishek Majumder
- Production company: BVM Films Pvt. Ltd.
- Distributed by: Armstrong Media
- Release date: 26 September 2014
- Country: India
- Language: Hindi

Meinu Ek Ladki Chaahiye (transl. I want a girl) is a 2014 Indian Hindi-language satirical film, starring Raghuvir Yadav, Puru Chibber, Reecha Sinha and Zakir Hussain. The film deals with the sensitive subject of rape cases. The backdrop of the film is a false rape case and the hero's fight for justice.

== Plot ==
Meinu Ek Ladki Chaahiye is a comical satirical Hindi movie starring Raghubir Yadav, Puru Chibber, Reecha Sinha, Zakir Hussain, Yatin Karyekar and Rashee Bindal. Govind (Raghubir Yadav) and his assistant Shishupal (Puru Chibber) get their first legal case of firoz( irfan razaa khan) after a lot of difficulties even though Govind's father is a renowned lawyer. Govind, a jovial person does everything that he can to save the accused. It's during the investigation that Govind and Shishupul come across some startling incidents. The case is of a serious nature but these two solve it in a very comical and hilarious way. However this case turns Govind's life upside down. Harassment by the police, getting locked up inside a jail, wife and daughter's hatred resulting in strained relations with them. Govind endures a lot. Even after all this, Govind is determined to find out the truth. This movie touches upon several issues in the country however in an entertaining manner. Since this is Govind's first case, will he and his assistant manage to save the accused? And will the culprits be brought to justice? Meinu Ek Ladki Chaahiye will answer all these questions.

== Cast ==
- Raghubir Yadav as Govind Ji
- Puru Chibber as Shishupal
- Reecha Sinha as Deepa Heroine
- Zakir Hussain as Lawyer Kharbanda
- Yatin Karyekar as Shanti Bhushan
- Jyoti Gauba as Harshita (Govind Ji's wife)
- Rashee as Mishrita (Govind Ji's Daughter)
- Kashmira Kulkarni as Kamya
- Ahtesham Azad Khan as Kulbhushan
- Irfan Razaa Khan as Firoz
- Deepak Sinha as Inspector of Police [INS]
- Sanjay Verma as Police Constable [PC]
- Jay Yadav
- Satya Prakash
- Khushboo Purohit as item number "Gori Chitti"

== Soundtrack ==
Meinu Ek Ladki Chaahiye

Soundtrack album by Ravi Pawar, Shadab Bhartiy
- Released: 11 August 2014
- Recorded: 2013
- Genre: Feature film soundtrack
- Length: 23:06
- Label: Zee Music
- Producers: Ravi Pawar, Shadab Bhartiy

The album is compiled with songs of all kinds for every music lover. From a melodious sound track to a typical Punjabi song, Meinu Ek Ladki Chaahiye is a complete album. The biggest highlight of the album is an item number sung by Mamta Sharma of Munni Badnaam and Fevicol Se fame. Mamta has crooned on ‘Gori Chitti’ which has been specially composed by Shahdab Bhartiya while Sanjay Dhoopa Mishra is the lyricist.

Super-hit Mika Singh has sung Teri Toh Jhand and for the first time, audience will get to witness Raghubir Yadav's dancing abilities. Mesmerising Roop Kumar Rathod has voiced Nanhe Paon which beautifully emotes the unique relation between a parent and his daughter. There's also a romantic track featuring Puru Chibber and Reecha Sinha ‘Main Sifar’. Javed Ali is the voice behind this love song. Ravi Pawar is the composer of all the songs and Sanjay Dhoopa Mishra is the lyricist.

| No. | Title | Lyrics | Singer(s) | Length |
|---|---|---|---|---|
| 1. | "Gori Chitti" | Sanjay Dhoopa Mishra | Mamta Sharma | 5:21 |
| 2. | "Raam naam Ladoo" | Sanjay Dhoopa Mishra | Nikhi D'souza, Nitin Arora | 4:35 |
| 3. | "Teri To Jhand" | Sanjay Dhoopa Mishra | Mika Singh | 3:15 |
| 4. | "Main Sifar Me" | Sanjay Dhoopa Mishra | Javed Ali | 4:53 |
| 5. | "Nanhe Paon" | Sanjay Dhoopa Mishra | Roop Kumar Rathod | 6:36 |
| Total length: | | | | 23:06 |

== Reception ==
Meinu Ek Ladki Chaahiye received mixed reviews and has been appreciated for the content of the film. RJ Jeeturaj gave 2.5 stars while JustBollywood.com gave 3.5 stars and said, "A well timed movie and a beautiful satire which is worth watching considering the ace performance of Raghubir Yadav." Also Celebexplore.com given 2.5 Stars.

Filmytown gave 3 stars and said, "The movie touches upon several issues in the country however in an entertaining manner."
