= Rasika Dugal =

Indian actress (born 1985)

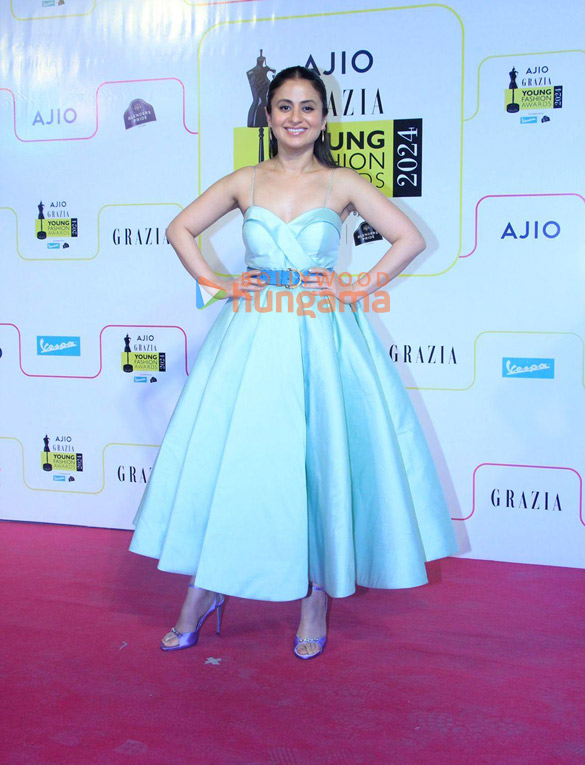
- Dugal in 2024
- Born: 17 January 1985 (age 41); Jamshedpur, Jharkhand, India
- Education: Sophia College for Women
- Occupation: Actress
- Years active: 2007–present
- Known for: Mirzapur(2018-present)
- Spouse: Mukul Chadda (m. 2010)

Rasika Dugal (born 17 January 1985) is an Indian actress known for her roles in several Indian movies and television productions.

She made her screen debut with a small role, in the film Anwar (2007) and went on to star in many critically acclaimed films namely No Smoking (2007), Aurangzeb (2013), Qissa (2015), Train Station (2015), Tu Hai Mera Sunday (2017) and Hamid (2018). In 2018, she was seen in the biographical movie Manto based on the life of writer Saadat Hassan Manto, where she essayed the role of Safia, Manto's wife, for which she garnered her first Screen Award nomination in the category of Best Supporting Actress. She appeared in movies like Lootcase and Darbaan, her performances in both of which were praised.

Rasika's breakthrough came in the year 2018 with her role in the Amazon Prime Video original series Mirzapur, for which she earned a nomination in Indian Television Academy Awards in the category of Best Actress in a web series. Since then, she has received critical appraisal for multiple web series, including Made in Heaven (2019), Delhi Crime (2019), Out of Love (2019-2021), A Suitable Boy (2020), and OK Computer (2021).

In addition to films, Dugal is also active in the television industry. She has appeared in many television serials, such as Powder (2010), Kismat (2010), Upanishad Ganga (2012), and P.O.W.- Bandi Yuddh Ke (2016). She co-wrote a short film with her husband (Mukul Chadda) titled Banana Bread. She also did a comic podcast named Uncovidable (2020), which was created by Vekeana Dhillon. It is available on the Audible platform.

== Early life and education ==
Rasika Dugal was born in Circuit House Area, Jamshedpur, Jharkhand to Jessie Dugal and Raveen Dugal. She attained a Bachelor of Science degree in mathematics in 2004 from Lady Shri Ram College for Women, Delhi. Subsequently, Dugal attended Sophia Polytechnic for a postgraduate diploma in Social Communications Media and FTII for a postgraduate diploma in acting.

== Career ==
=== Early roles, career struggles (2007–2014) ===
Rasika has been appearing in Hindi cinema since 2007. She first appeared in the film Anwar (2007) in a small role. Then she appeared in various films but in a minor role namely No Smoking (2007), Hijack (2008), Tahaan (2008), Agyaat (2009), Kshay (2011) and Aurangzeb (2013). Along with films, she appeared in television shows like Powder (2010), Rishta.com (2010), Kismat (2010), and Upanishad Ganga (2012). None of her roles failed to leave an impact.

=== Critical acclaim (2015–2017) ===
In 2015, she starred in the critically acclaimed film Qissa in the role of Neeli. The film received praise from the critics as well as the audience. The critic's consensus was "A masterpiece that lovers of parallel cinema would thoroughly enjoy. This unconventional and heart-breaking folk tale captures human emotions unlike any other recent Indian film." She also did a Malayalam language film Kammatti Paadam (2016), starring Dulquer Salmaan in the lead. She also played a recurring role in the Barun Sobti starrer Tu Hai Mera Sunday (2016).

She also appeared in television series like Dariba Dairies (2015) in the role of Zeenat Bano and P.O.W.- Bandi Yuddh Ke (2016) in the role of Shobha Thakur. She turned host on the show Devlok with Devdutt Pattanaik. She also appeared in The Viral Fever web shows like Permanent Roommates (2016), Humorously Yours (2016-2019), and TVF Couples (2017).

=== Recognition and commercial success (2018–present) ===
In 2018, she made a small appearance in the Netflix anthology film Lust Stories in Zoya Akhtar's segment. Then she appeared in Nandita Das's biographical movie Manto (2018). The movie was about the life of playwright Saadat Hasan Manto, Rasika played the role of his wife Safia. Her performance was praised by the critics, for which she received her first nomination at the Screen Awards in the category of Best Supporting Actress. After Manto, she appeared in the critically acclaimed film Hamid (2018) co-starring Vikas Kumar and Talha Arshad Reshi, directed by Aijaz Khan. The film won many accolades including National Film Award for Best Feature Film in Urdu at the 66th National Film Awards and Rasika Dugal won the Best Actor Award for her role in the film Hamid at Rajasthan International Film Festival.

She then starred in the Amazon Prime Video original series Mirzapur. She portrayed the role of Beena Tripathi. For her role in Mirzapur, she was nominated in the Indian Television Academy Awards in the category of Best Actress - Web Series. She also appeared in an episode of Zoya Akhtar's web series Made in Heaven, she portrayed the role of Nutan Yadav, the daughter of an ambitious politician willing to sacrifice his daughter's dreams for his political career. The show was released on Amazon Prime on 8 March 2019.

Subsequently, she played the main role in Hotstar original series Out of Love (2019-2021), playing the role of Dr. Meera Kapoor. The show was renewed for a second season which was released on 21 May 2021. She portrayed the role of a young IPS officer named Neeti Singh in the TV series Delhi Crime released on Netflix on 21 March 2019 which won the International Emmy Award for Best Drama Series. She also starred in supporting roles in web series such as A Suitable Boy (2020) and OK Computer (2021). In 2020, her two films were released namely Lootcase and Darbaan. In both of the films, her performance was praised by the critics. She also did a podcast titled Uncovidable (2020) which was released on Audible. It was created by Vekeana Dhillon.

Rasika was roped in for an international comedy audio series The Empire written by Anuvab Pal. She will be next seen in Srijit Mukherji's Sherdil which also stars Neeraj Kabi and Pankaj Tripathi in key roles.

== Personal life ==
In 2010, Rasika Dugal married fellow actor Mukul Chadda after dating for 3 years. She enjoys reading Urdu poetry, learning music, and listening to podcasts. She currently resides in Mumbai.

== Filmography ==
=== Films ===
Key
†	Denotes films that have not yet been released

Year	Title	Role	Notes
2007	Anwar	Deepti	
2007	No Smoking	Suzi	credited as Rasika Duggal
2008	Hijack	Neha	
2008	Tahaan	Nadira	
2009	Agyaat	Sameera	
2010	Thanks Maa	Krish's biological mother	
2011	Kshay	Chhaya	
2013	Aurangzeb	Trishla Phogat "Chhoti"	
2014	Bombay Talkies	Amrita Mathur	
2015	Qissa	Neeli	
2015	Train Station	Wife (India)	
2016	Kammatti Paadam	Juhi	Malayalam film
2016	Shor Se Shuruaat	Lina	
2017	Tu Hai Mera Sunday	Tasneem	
2018	Once Again	Sapna	
2018	Lust Stories	Maid	
2018	Hamid	Ishrat	
2018	Manto	Safia	
2019	#Gadhvi	Laxmi	
2019	Hamidabai Ki Kothi	Shabbo	ZEE5 film
2020	Lootcase	Lata	Hotstar film
2020	Darbaan	Bhuri	ZEE5 film
2024	Fairy Folk	Ritika	
2025	Logout	Pratyush's Sister	ZEE5 film
2025	Lord Curzon Ki Haveli	Ira	
2026	Kartavya	Varsha Malik	Netflix film
2026	Mirzapur	Beena Tripathi	

=== Television ===
Year	Show	Role	Notes	Ref(s)
2010	Powder	Rati		
2010	Rishta.com Revati			
2010	Kismat	Lubna		
2012	Upanishad Ganga	Various roles		
2015	Dariba Diaries	Zeenat Bano		
2016	Devlok with Devdutt Pattanaik	Host	Reality show	
2016	P.O.W.- Bandi Yuddh Ke	Shobha Thakur		

=== Web series ===
Year	Show	Role	Platform	Notes	Ref(s)
2016	Permanent Roommates	Cameo	The Viral Fever	Season 2; Episode 4	
2016–2023	Humorously Yours	Mrs. Kavya Goyal	The Viral Fever	9 episodes	
2017	TVF Couples	Kavya	The Viral Fever	Episode: Saheb, Biwi aur Billi	
2018–present	Mirzapur	Beena Tripathi	Amazon Prime Video	19 episodes	
2019	Made in Heaven	Nutan Yadav	Amazon Prime Video	2 episodes	
2019 – present	Delhi Crime	Neeti Singh	Netflix	7 episodes	
2019–2021	Out of Love	Dr. Meera Kapoor	Disney+ Hotstar	11 episodes	
2020	A Suitable Boy	Savita Mehra Kapoor	BBC One & Netflix		
2021	OK Computer	Satoshi	Disney+ Hotstar	2 episodes	
2022	Spike	Rudra	ZEE5	08 Episodes	
2023	Adhura	Supriya	Amazon Prime Video	08 Episodes	
2024	Shekhar Home	Iraboty	JioCinema		

=== Podcast ===
Key
†	Denotes podcasts that have not yet been released

Year	Title	Role	Platform	Notes	Ref(s)
2020	Uncovidable	Vekeana Dhillon	Audible	21 episodes	
TBA	The Empire †	TBA	TBA		

=== Short films ===
Key
†	Denotes short films that have not yet been released

Year	Title	Role	Ref(s)
2009	Narmeen	Noor	
2010	Na Jeeva Maharaaj		
2015	Agli Baar	Faiza	
2016	Chutney	Rasika	
2017	Life Support		
2017	The School Bag	Ammi	
2020	Banana Bread	Shruti	
2022	The Miniaturist of Junagadh	Nurhayat	

== Awards and nominations ==
Year	Award Show	Award	Title	Result	Ref(s)
2019	Screen Awards	Best Supporting Actress	Manto	Nominated	
2019	Rajasthan International Film Festival	Best Actress	Hamid	Won	
2019	Indian Television Academy Awards	Best Actress- Web Series	Mirzapur	Nominated	
2019	iReel Awards	Best Supporting Actress	Mirzapur	Nominated	
2021	Indian Film Festival of Melbourne	Best Actress	Lootcase	Nominated	
2021	Indian Film Festival of Melbourne	Best Actress- Web Series	Mirzapur	Nominated	
2023	2023 Filmfare OTT Awards	Best Supporting Actress (Drama Series)	Delhi Crime (season 2)	Nominated	
