= Filmfare Award for Best Debut Director =

Annual award for Hindi films

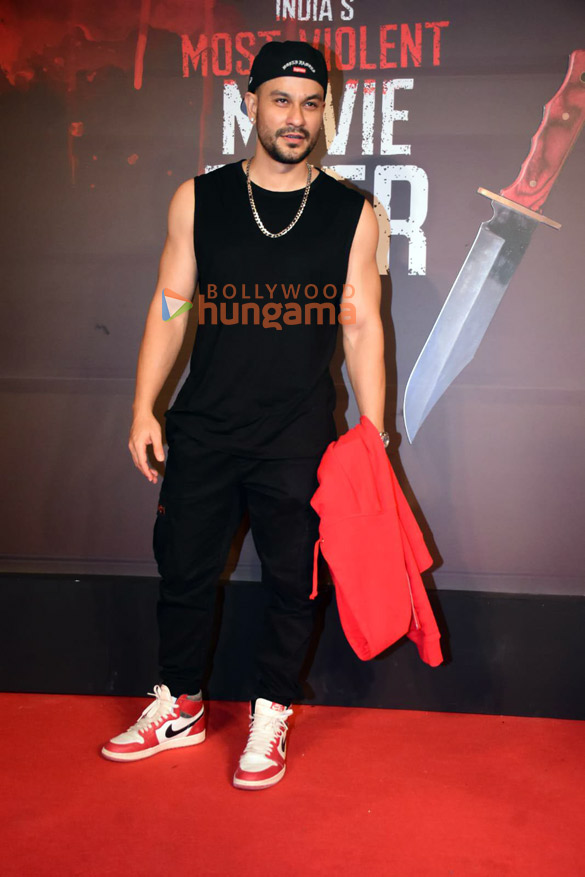
- The 70th recipients: Kunal Khemu (pictured) and Aditya Suhas Jambhale
- Awarded for: Best Direction by a Debut Director
- Country: India
- Presented by: Filmfare
- First award: Ayan Mukerji, Wake Up Sid (2010); Zoya Akhtar, Luck By Chance (2010)
- Currently held by: Aditya Suhas Jambhale; Article 370 and Kunal Kemmu; Madgaon Express (2025)
- Website: Filmfare Awards

The Filmfare Award for Best Debut Director is given by Filmfare at its annual Filmfare Awards for Hindi films to recognise directors for their debut films. The award for this category was first presented in 2010.

== List of winners ==
=== 2010s ===
Year	Director	Film	Ref.
2010	Ayan Mukerji	Wake Up Sid	
2010	Zoya Akhtar	Luck by Chance	
2011	Maneesh Sharma	Band Baaja Baaraat	
2012	Abhinay Deo	Delhi Belly	
2013	Gauri Shinde	English Vinglish	
2014	Ritesh Batra	The Lunchbox	
2015	Abhishek Varman	2 States	
2016	Neeraj Ghaywan	Masaan	
2017	Ashwiny lyer Tiwari	Nil Battey Sannata	
2018	Konkona Sen Sharma	A Death in the Gunj	
2019	Amar Kaushik	Stree	

=== 2020s ===
Year	Director	Film	Ref.
2020	Aditya Dhar	Uri: The Surgical Strike	
2021	Rajesh Krishnan	Lootcase	
2022	Seema Pahwa	Ramprasad Ki Tehrvi	
2023	Jaspal Singh Sandhu	Vadh	
2023	Rajeev Barnwal	Vadh	
2024	Tarun Dudeja	Dhak Dhak	
2025	Aditya Suhas Jambhale	Article 370	
2025	Kunal Kemmu	Madgaon Express	

== See also ==
- Filmfare Awards
- Hindi film industry
- Cinema of India
