= Ajji =

- Film poster
- Directed by: Devashish Makhija
- Written by: Devashish Makhija
- Screenplay by: Devashish Makhija; Mirat Trivedi; Maya Tideman
- Story by: Devashish Makhija; Mirat Trivedi
- Produced by: Vikram Mehra; Siddharth Anand Kumar
- Starring: Sushama Deshpande; Smita Tambe; Sharvani Suryavanshi; Abhishek Banerjee; Sadiya Siddiqui; Sudhir Pandey; Vikas Kumar; Manuj Sharma
- Cinematography: Jishnu Bhattacharjee
- Edited by: Ujjwal Chandra
- Music by: Mangesh Dhakde
- Production company: Yoodlee Films
- Distributed by: PVR Pictures
- Release date: 24 November 2017
- Running time: 104 minutes
- Country: India
- Language: Hindi
- Budget: ₹35 million
- Box office: ₹85 million

Ajji (transl. Granny) is an Indian Hindi-language crime-drama film directed by Devashish Makhija. The film stars Sushama Deshpande, Sharvani Suryavanshi, Abhishek Banerjee, Sadiya Siddiqui, Vikas Kumar, Manuj Sharma, Sudhir Pandey, Kiran Khoje, and Smita Tambe in major roles. "Ajji" has been positioned as a dark take on the classic fairy tale, "Red Riding Hood". The film is backed by Yoodlee Films, a production venture of Saregama.

The film was released theatrically in India on 24 November 2017. It is now available on Amazon Prime Video.

== Synopsis ==
When Ajji's 10-year-old granddaughter is raped, she finds that the police are unable to arrest the culprit as he is a local politician's son. Ajji decides to take matters into her own hands.

== Cast ==
- Sushama Deshpande as Ajji
- Smita Tambe as Vibha
- Sharvani Suryavanshi as Manda
- Sadiya Siddiqui as Leela
- Trimala Adhikari as Dolly
- Rasika Agashe as Ayurved
- Sudhir Pandey as Sharafat
- Shrikant Yadav as Dhavle Senior
- Abhishek Banerjee as Dhavle Junior
- Vikas Kumar as Inspector
- Manuj Sharma as Umya
- Shreyas Pandit as Milind
- Kaamod L. Kharade as Gawli
- Kiran Khoje as Dhavle Junior's wife
- Afreen Shaikh as Mukta

== Development ==
Jishnu Bhattacharjee is the cinematographer of the film. The film has been edited by Ujjwal Chandra, while the casting credits go to Abhishek Banerjee and Anmol Ahuja. Sikander Ahmad, Shamim Khan and Tiya Tejpal are the production designers of the film.

== Soundtrack ==
The music of the film has been given by Mangesh Dhakde with Kaamod Kharade working as sound designer and Aditya Yadav as sound editor.

== Critical reception ==
The film majorly received positive reviews from critics.

The Hollywood Reporter termed it as one of India's strongest independents this year. Renuka Vyavahare of The Times of India rated the film 4 out of 5 stars. Kunal Guha of Mumbai Mirror also rated it 4 stars out of 5, saying "Devashish Makhija's film manages to keep one on the edge." Subhash K. Jha said that "cinema cannot get any more basic or honest than this" and gave the movie 4 out of 5 stars. Movie Talkies gave the film 4/5 stars and wrote that "the cinematographer deserves a pat on the back for highlighting the dark and dingy underbelly of Mumbai."

Deccan Chronicle gave the movie 3.5 out of 5 stars calling it a standout film with a medieval, moral soul. Giving Ajji 3 stars out of 5, Anupama Chopra said that "Devashish is a master of atmosphere. He skillfully sets up a deep dread." Movie critic Rajeev Masand said, "It took me a long time to get the film out of my head" and gave it 3/5 stars. Daily News and Analysis gave the movie 3.5 out of 5 stars stating that "Ajji is not for the faint hearted." Glamsham called it a "bloody gruesome 'cut' above indie and rated the film 3.5 out of 5 stars. Rohit Vats of Hindustan Times gave the film 3 out of 5 stars calling it "An unpretentious revenge saga served with proper dose of blood and gore"

Filmfare rated the movie 2.5 out of 5 stars and called it "a film strictly for fans of dark and delicious cinema." Trade analyst Komal Nahta said that "Ajji is too dark and depressing to make a mark at the box office".

== Film Festival Screenings ==
The film won the Fresh Blood competition at the Beaune International Thriller Film Festival, France 2018. Sushama Deshpande, who played the title role, won The Flame Award at the UK Asian Film Festival and received a special jury mention for her performance at the Indian Film Festival of Los Angeles (IFFLA). "Ajji" was officially invited to compete at the 2017 Busan International Film Festival (BIFF) and was showcased in the New Currents section of the 22nd Korean film extravaganza. The film was also a part of the Mumbai Film Festival (MAMI) which took place 12–18 October and was played as part of the India Gold category. The film was also an official selection for Dharamshala International Film Festival, Singapore International Film Festival and Tallinn Black Nights Film Festival. The film was nominated for the Netpac Award at the 2018 Rotterdam International Film Festival.

== External References ==
- news18.com
- outlookindia.com
- asianage.com
- outlookindia.com/newsscroll
