= Joram (film) =

2023 Indian thriller drama film

- Theatrical release poster
- Directed by: Devashish Makhija
- Written by: Devashish Makhija
- Story by: Devashish Makhija
- Produced by: Shariq Patel; Ashima Avasthi Chaudhuri; Anupama Bose; Devashish Makhija
- Starring: Manoj Bajpayee; Mohammed Zeeshan Ayyub
- Cinematography: Piyush Puty
- Edited by: Abhro Banerjee
- Music by: Mangesh Dhakde
- Production companies: Zee Studios; Makhija Films
- Release dates: 1 February 2023 (IFFR); 8 December 2023 (theatrical)
- Running time: 138 minutes
- Country: India
- Language: Hindi
- Box office: ₹0.40 crore

Joram is a 2023 Indian Hindi-language thriller film written and directed by Devashish Makhija and produced by Zee Studios with Makhijafilm. It stars Manoj Bajpayee, Tannishtha Chatterjee, and Smita Tambe.

The film is the third collaboration between Makhija and Bajpayee, following the 2016 short Taandav and the 2018 drama Bhonsle.

Joram was theatrically released on 8 December 2023. At the 69th Filmfare Awards, the film received three nominations, including Best Film (Critics) and Best Actor (Critics) for Bajpayee, winning the former.

== Synopsis ==
A desperate man and his infant daughter fleeing a system that wants them crushed at any cost, a cop giving unwilling chase, and a bereaved mother seeking ruthless vengeance collide in a tense survival thriller across a brutal landscape of devastated forests, blind greed, rebellion, and the bloody aftershocks of "development".

== Cast ==
- Manoj Bajpayee as Dasru / Bala
- Mohammed Zeeshan Ayyub as Ratnakar
- Smita Tambe as Phulo Karma
- Megha Mathur as Bidesi
- Tannishtha Chatterjee as Vaano (special appearance)
- Rajshri Deshpande as Mukta (guest appearance)
- Apurva Dongarwal as Manju
- Raman Gupta as Constable Solanki
- Bharati Perwani as Khare
- Dhaniram Prajapati as Divender

== Production ==
Bajpayee has said of the production:

Joram comes with a very unique concept. We have shot at very difficult locations and it wouldn’t have been possible without the relentless efforts made by the team of studio and the production! It was a real privilege to work on this one, now that our film made it to the likes of Film Bazaar, I am quite stoked.

== Screenings ==
Date	Screening Event	Location
February 2023	International Film Festival Rotterdam	Rotterdam, Netherlands
June 2023	70th Sydney Film Festival	Sydney, Australia
July 2023	Durban International Film Festival	Durban, South Africa
October 2023	28th Busan International Film Festival	Busan, South Korea
October 2023	59th Chicago International Film Festival	Chicago, USA

== Reception ==
On the review aggregator website Rotten Tomatoes, 95% of 19 critics' reviews are positive, with an average rating of 7.2/10.

Phil Hoad of The Guardian gave the film four stars out of five, stating, "In this gritty thriller, director Devashish Makhija skillfully blends social satire with repressive realism to gradually build suspense as a parent struggles to outrun his oppressors". Saibal Chatterjee of NDTV also gave it four stars and wrote, "Manoj Bajpayee keeps the disturbing movie grounded even if it leaves viewers in disbelief. He fully gives himself over to Dasru Kerketta, fusing the agony of the defenseless with the wrath of the unfortunate. Joram isn't supposed to be amusing, it is engrossing from beginning to end". Shubhra Gupta of The Indian Express gave the production 2.5 stars out of five and said in her review that Bajpayee is effective, yet his register of hopelessness and horror is restricted. Dhaval Roy of The Times of India gave the film four stars out of five and wrote, "Joram is a grim story that you will remember for a very long time. It deviates from being a survival drama since the socio-political aspect dominates the tale, but its powerful performances and storyline make it worth seeing". Monika Rawal Kukreja of Hindustan Times said in her review that Joram will only appeal to a very specific demographic because, while being a compelling narrative about institutional imbalance and more, it never quite gains the velocity necessary to keep readers interested.

== Accolades ==
Award	Ceremony date	Category	Recipients	Result	Ref.
Filmfare Awards	28 January 2024	Best Film (Critics)	Devashish Makhija	Won	
Filmfare Awards	28 January 2024	Best Actor (Critics)	Manoj Bajpayee	Nominated	
Filmfare Awards	28 January 2024	Best Story	Devashish Makhija	Won	
