= Lootcase =

2020 Indian film directed by Rajesh Krishnan

- Release poster
- Directed by: Rajesh A Krishnan
- Screenplay by: Kapil Sawant; Rajesh Krishnan
- Story by: Kapil Sawant; Rajesh Krishnan
- Dialogues by: Kapil Sawant
- Produced by: Fox Star Studios
- Starring: Kunal Khemu; Rasika Dugal; Vijay Raaz; Ranvir Shorey; Gajraj Rao
- Narrated by: Ninad Kamat
- Cinematography: Sanu John Varghese
- Edited by: Anand Subaya
- Music by: Songs: Rohan-Vinayak; Amar Mangrulkar; Background Score: Sameer Uddin
- Production companies: Fox Star Studios; Soda Films
- Distributed by: Disney+ Hotstar
- Release date: 31 July 2020
- Running time: 132 minutes
- Country: India
- Language: Hindi

Lootcase (Note: The name is a pun on suitcase, with Hindi word "Loot" (लूट) meaning robbery/theft/dacoity. The story revolves around a suitcase full of money, which the protagonist finds accidentally. However, the fact that he does not deposit it with the right authority, and decides to keep it for himself, is widely thought to be equivalent to theft!) is a 2020 Indian black comedy crime film directed by Rajesh Krishnan, of TVF Tripling fame. The film is produced and bankrolled by Fox Star Studios. It features Kunal Kemmu and Rasika Dugal in lead roles, and Vijay Raaz, Ranvir Shorey and Gajraj Rao in supporting roles. The film revolves around a red coloured suitcase (Joy Bagman/Anand Petikar). It was scheduled for theatrical release on 10 April 2020, but the release was postponed due to COVID-19 pandemic. It was released on 31 July 2020 on Disney+ Hotstar to mixed reviews from critics.

== Plot ==
Nandan Kumar, a middle-class man who repairs machines at a printing press, doesn't believe in destiny and lives in a chawl with his taunting wife Lata and son Ayush. Nandan's family struggles to reconcile their dreams and aspirations with their financial reality.

MLA Patil attempts to transfer Rs. 100 million and a file containing evidence of widespread embezzlement to another minister. He blackmails local gangster Omar to carry out this task; his men put the money in a red suitcase. While transporting the money, Omar's men are ambushed by the goons of National Geographic obsessed rival gangster Bala Rathore, Patil's men hide the suitcase during the shootout, hoping to retrieve it later. However, Nandan comes across it by chance, and finding it full of money, decides to take it home and hides it in his neighbour's home as his neighbour (an old man) has gone to his village and gave the keys to Nandan while going. When Bala and Patil realize that the suitcase (and the file) is missing, they send their respective men to find it at any cost. Patil additionally blackmails policeman Kolte and recruits him to retrieve the suitcase.

Kolte and his informant Faizu gather information about the shootout but find that nearby CCTV cameras are not operational. Meanwhile, Nandan spends some money on his family but doesn't reveal the money's source to Lata. Bala's men spot Faizu, and start tracking Kolte. Nandan removes some of the money from the suitcase, divides it into several packets, and hides them around the house, keeping one packet in his office drawer. One CCTV camera becomes operational, allowing Kolte to see Nandan leaving the scene in an auto-rickshaw. Meanwhile, Nandan has his hands full in attempting to keep his money hidden from his neighbours and Lata. In an effort to spend his cash, he attempts to buy a luxurious apartment only to find that they do not accept cash payments.

Kolte finds the auto-rickshaw driver from the CCTV footage and is able to identify Nandan (the driver had spotted Nandan's debit card with his name and bank information). Nandan goes to his bank to inquire about a cash-counting machine, but the cashiers laugh him off. Paranoid, he makes a scene and leaves. When Kolte is investigating at the same bank, the cashiers tell him about Nandan's suspicious behaviour and provide him Nandan's address. Kolte arrives at his home just as Lata finds the hidden suitcase in the kitchen. Kolte holds the family at gunpoint and demands the money back and Nandan complies. Kolte finds out about the packet in the office, and takes Nandan to retrieve it. Bala's men report this to their boss, and Bala and Patil join hands to kill Kolte and recover the money.

When Kolte and Nandan arrive at the office, Kolte sends Nandan inside to get the money. As soon as Nandan leaves, Kolte is ambushed by Bala's men. He manages to escape and finds Patil's file; realising its importance, he decides to blackmail Patil. Meanwhile Nandan is held up by his drunk boss as he attempts to get the packet. Kolte instructs him to come to a secret warehouse. Nandan manages to get there but Bala and Omar ambush the warehouse with their respective men. In the resulting shootout, Nandan is the only survivor. Not learning his lesson about greed, he decides to take the money at the warehouse, but leaves the file. When the contents of the file are leaked, Patil's political career is doomed. He retires to his village and takes up farming, but is quickly tracked down and murdered by Omar's men.

== Cast ==
- Kunal Khemu as Nandan Kumar, Lata's husband
- Rasika Dugal as Lata Kumar, Nandan's wife
- Vijay Raaz as Gangster Bala Rathod
- Ranvir Shorey as Inspector Madhav Kolte, a corrupt officer in the Mumbai Police Crime Branch
- Gajraj Rao as MLA Suyash Patil
- Aryan Prajapati as Ayush Kumar, Nandan and Lata's son
- Shashi Ranjan as Abdul
- Sumit Nijhawan as Omar Siddiqui
- Nilesh Diwekar as Rajan Singh, Bala's henchman
- Aakash Dabhade as Graduate, Bala's henchman
- Atul Todankar as Subhash Raman, Patil's personal assistant
- Vijay Nikam as Vasant Seth, newspaper press owner

== Production ==
The filming started in the mid July 2019.

== Soundtrack ==
Lootcase

Soundtrack album by Rohan-Vinayak and Amar Mangrulkar
- Released: 28 July 2020
- Recorded: 2019
- Genre: Feature film soundtrack
- Length: 11:33
- Language: Hindi
- Label: Saregama

The music for the film was composed by Rohan-Vinayak and Amar Mangrulkar, while the lyrics written by Shreyas Jain and Kapil Sawant.

Track listing
No.	Title	Lyrics	Music	Singer(s)	Length
1.	"Pavitra Party"	Shreyas Jain	Rohan-Vinayak	Nakash Aziz, Keka Ghoshal, Arhaan Hussain	3:51
2.	"Laal Rang Ki Peti"	Kapil Sawant	Amar Mangrulkar	Vivek Hariharan	4:16
3.	"Muft Ka Chandan"	Shreyas Jain	Rohan-Vinayak	Romy, Shreyas Jain, Pinky Maidasani	3:26
Total length:					11:33

== Release ==
The first look poster was released on 16 September 2019. The film was scheduled to be released on 10 April 2020 but was indefinitely postponed due to the COVID-19 pandemic. On 29 June 2020, Disney+ Hotstar conducted virtual press conference where Uday Shankar announced that the film will release on Disney+ Hotstar exclusively as part of Disney+ Hotstar Multiplex initiative. It was released on 31 July 2020.

== Reception ==
On the review aggregator website Rotten Tomatoes, 50% of 8 critics' reviews are positive, with an average rating of 5.1/10.

=== Accolades ===
Award (Note: Awards, festivals and organizations are in alphabetical order.)	Date of ceremony (Note: Date is linked to the article about the awards held that year, wherever possible.)	Category	Recipient(s)	Result	Ref.
Indian Film Festival of Melbourne	15—30 August 2021	Best Film	Rajesh Krishnan	Nominated	
Indian Film Festival of Melbourne	15—30 August 2021	Best Actress	Rasika Dugal	Nominated	
Filmfare Awards	27 March 2021	Best Film (Critics)	Rajesh Krishnan	Nominated	
Filmfare Awards	27 March 2021	Best Debut Director	Rajesh Krishnan	Won	
Filmfare Awards	27 March 2021	Best Story	Rajesh Krishnan and Kapil Sawant	Nominated	
Filmfare Awards	27 March 2021	Best Screenplay	Rajesh Krishnan and Kapil Sawant	Nominated	
Filmfare Awards	27 March 2021	Best Background Score	Sameer Uddin	Nominated	
Filmfare Awards	27 March 2021	Best Editing	Anand Subaya	Nominated	
Filmfare Awards	27 March 2021	Best Action	Manohar Verma	Nominated	
Filmfare Awards	27 March 2021	Best Sound Design	Lochan Kanvinde	Nominated	
