= Jogi (2022 film) =

2022 Indian film by Ali Abbas Zafar

- Official release poster
- Directed by: Ali Abbas Zafar
- Written by: Sukhmani Sadana; Ali Abbas Zafar
- Produced by: Ali Abbas Zafar; Himanshu Kishan Mehra
- Starring: Diljit Dosanjh; Amyra Dastur; Hiten Tejwani; Mohammed Zeeshan Ayyub
- Cinematography: Marcin Laskawiec
- Edited by: Steven H. Bernard
- Music by: Julius Packiam
- Production company: AAZ Films
- Distributed by: Netflix
- Release date: 16 September 2022
- Running time: 116 minutes
- Country: India
- Language: Hindi

Jogi is a 2022 Indian Hindi-language period drama film directed by Ali Abbas Zafar and co-written by Sukhmani Sadana. It was released on Netflix on 16 September 2022 and is set amidst the backdrop of the 1984 anti-Sikh riots, with a cast including Diljit Dosanjh, Kumud Mishra, Mohammed Zeeshan Ayyub, Hiten Tejwani and Amyra Dastur.

Upon its release on Netflix, Jogi received mixed reviews from critics, with praise for the performances (especially of Ayyub's, Mishra's and Dosanjh's), direction, cinematography, background score, editing, production design, and themes. However, the screenplay and depiction of the 1984 anti-Sikh riots received a polarizing response.

== Plot ==
The film is set in Delhi's eastside neighbourhood of Trilokpuri, and depicts a three-day period in the immediate aftermath of the assassination of Prime Minister Indira Gandhi on 31 October 1984, four months after Operation Blue Star. In the film, stories of the fictional characters centre on the 1984 anti-Sikh riots. It's a usual routine morning for Jogi's traditional working class Sikh family of three generations. The children get ready for school, women fry parathas, and elders and men sit around the table and make jokes. They have no idea as to what is about to happen. By the time Jogi and his father are on the bus to work, news of Indira Gandhi's assassination by her two Sikh bodyguards that morning, spreads. Jogi and his father board a bus. A group men beat him and his father, who asks "what is our fault?" to which they reply is "you are a sardar".

Over the following three days, Sikhs are scapegoated and scenes depict pockets of violence towards them. They are recognised by their distinct appearances and by their names on the electoral register, propagated by the region's MLA Tejpal Arora. Jogi's brother-in-law is beaten as he opens his shop and burned alive. Mobs of people run down the streets and burn buildings. A man in a turban is shown running whilst on fire and shouting for help, and a Sikh family is shown being burned in a car.

Jogi returns home to find an empty house and his neighbours are cutting their children's hair in the hope that they will not be recognised. When Jogi reaches his sister's house, he sees Sukhi (Jogi's elder brother) along with other family members sitting and crying around Heer who is stitching a shirt on the sewing machine for her dead husband. Jogi consoles his sister and watching this, Sukhi who is already in deep shock, cannot bear the pain of his sister and he breaks down.

Rawinder Chautala, Jogi's friend and police officer, sees Jogi's family name on the target list and advises him to leave for Punjab. However, Jogi vows to help not just his own family but his whole Sikh community. Following an intensely emotional scene where he cuts his long hair, Rawinder and his friend Kareem, help him with his mission. Splitting the Sikhs into two groups, they take the first round of people in a truck (with Kareem's help) that they disguise as a weapon and alcohol truck, to find Sikhs and take them to Punjab.

A brief flashback explains Laali's vendetta with Jogi after Kamo's suicide. A final scene initially appearing to see the end of the community, eventually ends with the death of Jogi from a shot by Arora just moments after his community is saved by the Indian Army, brought in unexpectedly by Laali.

== Cast ==
- Diljit Dosanjh as Joginder Singh "Jogi"
- Kumud Mishra as Tejpal Arora, MLA
- Mohammed Zeeshan Ayyub as Rawinder Chautala, Jogi's Hindu friend and police officer
- Hiten Tejwani as Laali, police inspector
- Amyra Dastur as Kammo
- Apinderdeep Singh as "Sukhi", Jogi's elder brother
- Paresh Pahuja as Kaleem Ansari, Jogi's Muslim friend
- Neelu Kohli as Jogi's mother
- Mikhail Yawalkar as Daler Singh
- Mandeep Kaur as Sukhi's wife
- Charu Kumar as Heer, Jogi's sister
- Samarjit Singh Mahajan, Jogi's nephew
- K.P. Singh as Tejinder, Heer's husband
- Noyrika as Shehnaaz, Kaleem's wife

== Reception ==
On the review aggregator website Rotten Tomatoes, 60% of 10 critics' reviews are positive, with an average rating of 5.3/10.

Deepa Gahlot of Rediff.com gave the film 3.5/5 stars and noted, "Jogi is a slice of current history, and unlike another recent film that does not need to be named, never resorts to sensationalism. It is the story of good overcoming evil, which is what keeps hope alive in dark times." A critic from Bollywood Hungama gave 3 out of 5 stars and wrote, "Jogi feature a moving tale in a sensitive yet mainstream manner and rests on brilliant performances." Anuj Kumar of The Hindu said, "Diljit has a knack for generating an emotional bond with the audience but somehow he gravitates towards roles that are spotless and characters that could do no wrong. Here, even in the love story, it is the girl (Amyra Dastur) who is almost held guilty for falling in love with Jogi and coming in between two friends. Diljit is trying to be a hero in a film where there could be none and Zafar allows him that space." Aman Wadhwa's 3.5 star review for DNA India stated, "The Ali Abbas Zafar directorial must be commended for its take on inter-religious harmony and for demonstrating how friendship, togetherness, and hope win over in troubled times." Abhimanyu Mathur of Hindustan Times said, "If there is any doubt about Diljit Dosanjh's acting skills, Jogi should clear them once and for all. The singer-turned-actor delivers one of the best onscreen performances by a Bollywood leading man in recent times, bringing out vulnerability rarely seen in commercial Hindi cinema. He is deftly supported by a strong support cast and director Ali Abbas Zafar's sensitive touch."

Harmeet Shah Singh of India Today, who had witnessed the 1984 riots when he was age 10 stated, "For all its flaws and characteristic Bollywoodism, Jogi still serves as a relevant production for the Netflix generation. It may not be one of the best classic historical films produced cerebrally, but the movie is still a meaningful step in educating the present breed about the toll hatred afflicts on humanity and the scars it leaves behind." Manik Sharma of Firstpost wrote, "Jogi has the tools and the material to create something harrowingly difficult to watch and yet impossible to look away from. Instead, it settles for a mushy story that functions like an unearned, unnecessary twist." Shubhra Gupta's 1.5 star review for The Indian Express stated, "In the way 'Jogi' uses Bollywoodian melodrama as its chief operating instrument, it serves only to undercut the tragedy, making it less than it was."
