= Sita Bhateja =

Indian gynecologist and obstetrician

- Born: 1930; Multan, British India (present-day Pakistan)
- Died: 2018; Bengaluru, Karnataka, India
- Education: MBBS, King Edward Memorial Hospital and Seth Gordhandas Sunderdas Medical College (1970)
- Occupations: Gynecologist, obstetrician
- Known for: Founder of Sita Bhateja Specialty Hospital, Bengaluru
- Spouse: Amrit Bhateja

Sita Bhateja was an Indian gynecologist and obstetrician who founded and led the Sita Bhateja Specialty Hospital in Bengaluru, Karnataka. She practiced medicine for over five decades and was respected for her humanitarian approach and dedication to women's healthcare.

== Early life and education ==
Sita Bhateja was born in a Jat family in Multan, in British India (present-day Pakistan). She spent her childhood moving between different cities due to her father and grandfather's employment as jailers. Inspired by Marie Curie, she decided to pursue medicine to achieve independence and contribute to society.

She graduated with an MBBS from the King Edward Memorial Hospital and Seth Gordhandas Sunderdas Medical College in Mumbai in 1970.

== Medical career ==
After completing her degree, Bhateja worked in refugee camps in Kurukshetra and Jammu, where she provided gynecological care and delivered babies for displaced populations.

She later moved to Bengaluru in 1957, where she worked at CSI Hospital and St. Martha's Hospital, sometimes without pay. In 1965, she established her own clinic, which grew into the Sita Bhateja Nursing Home and eventually into the multi-specialty Sita Bhateja Specialty Hospital.

== Sita Bhateja Specialty Hospital ==
Initially focused on obstetrics and gynecology, the hospital later expanded under her son, neurosurgeon Arvind Bhateja, to include neurosurgery, orthopedics, plastic surgery, intensive care, urology, and other specializations. The facility gained a reputation as one of Bengaluru's most respected private hospitals.

== Later years and death ==
Bhateja continued to work into her late 80s, sometimes delivering multiple babies in a single day. She was also an avid stamp collector, with a significant collection of pre-Independence Indian stamps, admired by Presidents K. R. Narayanan and Pratibha Patil.

She died in December 2018 in Bengaluru.
