= Nandita Das =

Indian actress, director

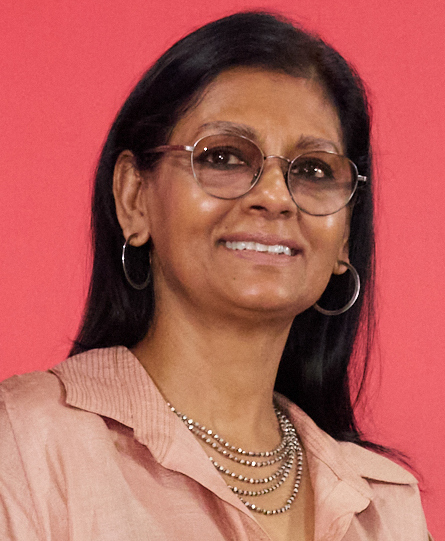
- Das in 2025
- Born: 7 November 1969 (age 56); Bombay (now Mumbai), Maharashtra, India
- Occupation: Actor, Director, Writer, Producer and Social Advocate
- Years active: 1987–present
- Spouses: Soumya Sen (m. 2002; div. 2007) Subodh Maskara (m. 2010; sep. 2016)
- Children: 1
- Honours: Chevalier de l'Ordre des Arts et des Lettres (2011)

Nandita Das (born 7 November 1969) is an Indian actress and director. She has acted in over 40 feature films in ten different languages. Das appeared in the films Fire (1996), Earth (1998), Bawandar (2000), Kannathil Muthamittal (2002), Azhagi (2002), Kamli (2006), and Before The Rains (2007). Her directorial debut Firaaq (2008), premiered at the Toronto Film Festival and travelled to more than 50 festivals, winning more than 20 awards. Her second film as a director was Manto (2018). Based on the life of 20th Century Indo-Pakistani short story writer Sadat Hasan Manto, the film was screened at Cannes Film Festival in the "Un Certain Regard" section. In September 2019, Das produced a two-minute Public Service Announcement music video India's Got Colour. The music video is about the issue of colourism and urges the audience to celebrate India's diversity of skin colour. Her first book, 'Manto & I', chronicles her 6-year long journey of making the film. She wrote, directed, produced and acted in a short film called, Listen to Her, that sheds light on the increase in domestic violence and overburden of work that women have been facing during the lockdown. Her third directorial venture, Zwigato, explores the life of a food delivery rider and his family. After premiering at various festivals, it was released in India and overseas on 17 March 2023.

Das has served twice on the jury of the Cannes Film Festival. In 2005, she served on the main competition jury alongside Fatih Akin, Javier Bardem, Salma Hayek, Benoît Jacquot, Emir Kusturica, Toni Morrison, Agnès Varda, and John Woo. In 2013, she served on the Cinéfondation and short films jury with Jane Campion, Maji-da Abdi, Nicoletta Braschi, and Semih Kaplanoğlu.

In 2011, she was made Chevalier de l'Ordre des Arts et des Lettres (Knight of the Order of Arts and Letters) by the French Government, one of the nation's highest civilian awards. She was commended for her "contribution towards the development of Indo-French cooperation in the field of cinema." In 2009, France released a stamp featuring Das, from artist Titouan Lamazou's project "Women of the World."

Das was the first Indian inducted into the International Hall of Fame of the International Women's Forum in Washington, DC. She was recognized in 2011 for "her sustained contributions to the arts and to the world as one of the most gripping cinema arts leaders of our time." Her fellow inductees were Anna Fendi, Heidi Klum, and Madam Chen Zhili.

Nandita speaks about her work with Mani Ratnam and her latest film 'Manto' on BBC Radio with Ashanti Omkar.

== Early life and education ==
Das's father is the artist Jatin Das, and her mother is Varsha Das, a writer. She was born in Mumbai and grew up mostly in Delhi in an Odia family, where she attended the Sardar Patel Vidyalaya school. She received bachelor's degree in Geography from Miranda House and Master of Social Work from the Delhi School of Social Work, both affiliated with the University of Delhi.

Das was a Yale World Fellow in 2014. She was one of 16 emerging global leaders chosen from nearly 4000 applicants.

She has also taught at the Rishi Valley School.

== Career ==
=== Acting ===
Das has acted in over 40 feature films with directors such as Mrinal Sen, Adoor Gopalakrishnan, Shyam Benegal, Deepa Mehta, and Mani Ratnam. She began her acting career with the street theatre group Jana Natya Manch. She is best known for her performances in director Deepa Mehta's films Fire (1996) and Earth (1998; alongside Aamir Khan), Bawander (directed by Jagmohan Mundhra), and Naalu Pennungal (directed by Adoor Gopalakrishnan). She has also acted in the movie Before the Rains, an Indian-British period drama film directed by Santosh Sivan. She has acted in films in ten different languages; English, Hindi, Bengali, Malayalam, Tamil, Telugu, Urdu, Marathi, Odia, and Kannada. The Tamil actor Sukanya provided Das' speaking voice in the Tamil classic Kannathil Muthamittal.

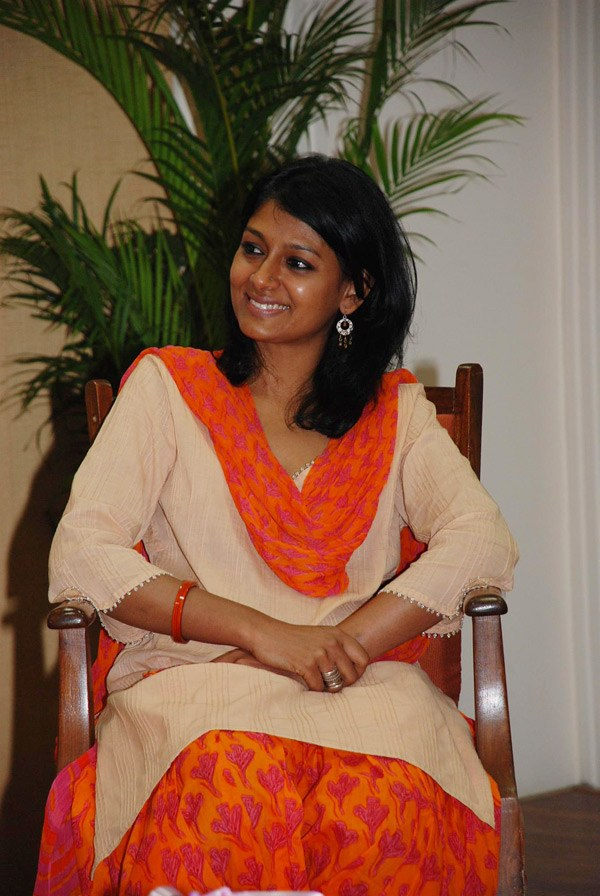
Das in 2011

Das co-wrote, directed and acted in a play called Between the Lines (2014). She has also acted in Khamosh! Adalat Jaari Hai (2017), a Cineplay production directed by Ritesh Menon, which was based on the Marathi-language play written by Vijay Tendulkar, alongside Saurabh Shukla and Swanand Kirkire.

=== Direction ===
In 2008, she directed her first film, Firaaq. The film is a work of fiction "based on a thousand true stories" and is set a month after the 2002 Gujarat riots in India. It is an ensemble film that interweaves multiple stories over a 24-hour period, as the characters from different strata of society, grapple with the lingering effects of violence. Das said that the film "gave a voice to so much that remains silent". In 2018, Nandita directed Manto which is based on the life and works of Saadat Hasan Manto, the Urdu writer of the 1940's. It features Nawazuddin Siddiqui and Rasika Dugal in the lead roles. The film premiered at the Cannes Film Festival and then at the Toronto International Film Festival in 2018. Das produced and directed a PSA music video, India's Got Colour in 2019. Her third directorial venture Zwigato explores the life of a food delivery rider and his family, starring Kapil Sharma and Shahana Goswami in the lead roles. It is also produced by her company Nandita Das Initiatives, in collaboration with Applause Entertainment. Zwigato was released in India in 2023 and is streaming on Amazon Prime Video. The film has garnered much critical acclaim from critics and audiences.

=== Writing ===
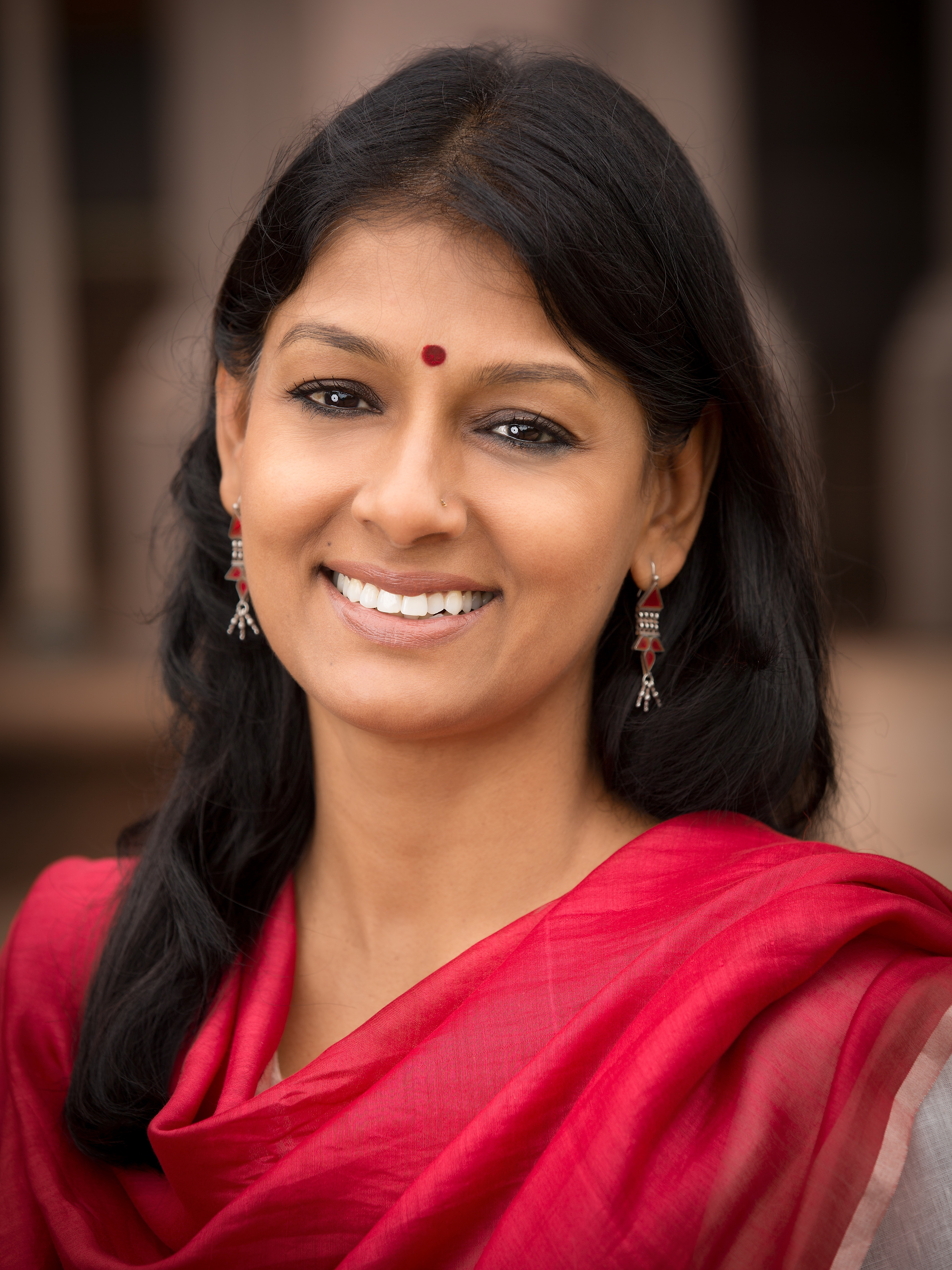
Das in 2016

Nandita Das’s writing work has evolved organically. She has written articles for various publications and used to write a monthly column for The Week, called the Last Word. In 2019, Das wrote Manto and I, a hardbound book that chronicles her 6 year long journey of making the film, Manto. It is a book of images and writings that explores the creative process from the inception of the idea to finally releasing the film. In addition, Das edited Jatin Das: A Retrospective 1963-2023, a book that was launched during the retrospective show of her father, who was an artist, at the National Gallery of Modern Art. The book traces his six-decade career, featuring his artwork, writings, and essays by art scholars and friends.

Through her writings, Nandita Das has blended her personal insights with artistic expressions, creating compelling narratives that extend beyond her cinematic work.

=== Voice narration ===
Das narrated the children's audiobook series Under the Banyan, and Mahatma Gandhi's autobiography by Charkha Audiobooks, The Story of My Experiments with Truth. She was also a voice actor in the children's television series Wonder Pets, as the Bengal Tiger in the episode "Save the Bengal Tiger" (2007).

She also sang the song "Ramleela" for the movie Aks and "Jagya Sarsi" for the movie Bawandar.

=== Nandita Das Initiatives ===
Nandita Das Initiatives LLP (NDI) was set up in 2016 by Nandita Das. NDI’s first venture, Manto, premiered at the Cannes Film Festival. In 2019, NDI produced a music video called "India’s Got Colour" to celebrate diversity in skin tones and call out colourism. In 2020, during the pandemic, NDI made a short film, Listen to Her, that dealt with the rise in domestic violence and the workload that women suffered. It was supported by UNESCO and other UN bodies. The company produced her third feature film, Zwigato, which premiered at the Toronto International Film Festival in 2022.

=== Festival jury ===
#	Festival Name	year
1	Cannes Film Festival	2005
2	Karlovy Vary International Film Festival	2007
3	Marrakech International Film Festival	2009
4	Cannes Film Festival	2013
5	San Sebastián International Film Festival	2015
6	Regina International Film Festival	2018
7	Shanghai International Film Festival	2023
8	Busan International Film Festival	2025

== Personal life ==
In 2002, Das married Saumya Sen. The couple began Leapfrog, a media organisation geared towards making socially conscious ad films. The couple divorced in 2007. After dating Subodh Maskara, a Mumbai industrialist, for a couple of months, she married him on 2 January 2010 and moved to Mumbai. Das and Maskara have a son named Vihaan. In January 2017, the couple announced that they have parted ways.

Nandita Das is an atheist. "If I align with anything it would probably be Buddhism," she said.

== Activism ==
Das has master's degree in Social Work from the University of Delhi. She has worked for children's rights, HIV/AIDS awareness, to end violence against women, and she has spoken up in support of the JNU protests and MeToo movement on her official X (formerly known as Twitter). In 2009, Das was appointed Chairperson of the Children's Film Society of India. In 2012, she was the guest of honor at the iVolunteer Awards, held in Mumbai. Das also donated to the launch of the investigative journalism magazine Tehelka, founded by Tarun Tejpal. In 2013, she participated in the Women of India Leadership Summit alongside other artists and women's activists.

=== India's Got Colour (Dark is Beautiful) Campaign ===
In 2013, Das became the face of the "Dark is Beautiful" campaign. Launched by Women of Worth in 2009, the campaign aims to draw attention to the effects of discrimination based on skin color in India. The campaign urges women and men to celebrate the beauty and diversity of all skin tones, using slogans such as "Stay UNfair, Stay Beautiful." Das said in 2014: In the [Indian film] industry a makeup man or a cinematographer would come and say can you lighten your skin a little, especially when you are playing the middle class educated character. In 2019, the Campaign was reinvented as India’s Got Colour. Along with Mahesh Mathai, Nandita Das has produced and co-directed a two-minute PSA for the campaign. The music video features several eminent artists from the Indian Film Industry.

=== Speaking Engagements ===
Das has been a featured speaker at various platforms in India and abroad, including at MIT (in 2007, after a screening of Fire), and at Tufts University. In March 2026, she presented the CASI Spring 2026 Saluja Global Fellow Lecture "My Journey from Social Work to Cinema" as part of her week-long fellowship at UPenn.

==== International ====
Month/Year	Topic	Moderator	Organiser
March, 2026	My Journey from Social Work to Cinema	Fellowship	CASI, University of Pennsylvania
May, 2024	All for Health, Health for All	John-Arne Rottingen	WHO, Geneva, Switzerland
April, 2023	Film Screening of Zwigato, followed by Q & A	Prof. Abhijit Banerjee	MIT, Cambridge, USA
April, 2023	Zwigato Film Screening followed by Q & A	Smriti Mundhra	Indian Film Festival of Los Angeles, Beverly Hills, LA, USA.
July, 2015	Stories of Wellbeing	Conversation with Jo Confino	Institute for Leadership and Sustainability and Brathay Trust, University of Cumbria Ambleside, UK
October, 2014	Struggles of Being a Woman in Society and Cinema		Centre for South Asian and Indian Ocean Studies, Tufts University Massachusetts, USA
October, 2014	Infinite Identities		Asian American Cultural Centre and La Casa, Yale University Connecticut, USA
September, 2014	The Role of Arts in Social Change	Conversation with Cara Moyer-Duncan moderated by Mukti Khaire	Harvard South Asian Institute, Harvard University Cambridge, USA
March, 2014	Changing Minds and Mindsets- Social Inclusion Through Arts	Conversation with Maitreyi Das	World Bank Head Quarters Washington DC, USA
March, 2014	Art and Social Change,		Watson Institute of International and Public Affairs, Brown University Rhode Island, USA
May, 2013	EL- SOMNI (The Dream)	A gastronomy event with 12 courses & 12 eminent guests from around the world	City Council of Barcelona and the Celler de Can Roca Barcelona, Spain
May, 2011	Role of Art/Cinema in Transforming the World		Rome Cornerstone Conference International Women’s Forum Rome, Italy
March, 2011	Bollywood and Beyond		Maximum India Festival Kennedy Centre Washington DC, USA
June, 2008	Identity and the Notion of the Other		Eranos Tagung 2008 Ascona, Switzerland
September, 2005	A Personal Journey- Social Work and Cinema		Rietberg Museum for Lange Nacht Der Museen (long night of the museum) Zurich, Switzerland
October, 2004	What Creates Change?		Annual Gala of SAKHI, a South Asian women's organization New York, USA
September, 2004	Building Youth Leadership		Pan-Asian Youth Leadership Summit Hiroshima, Japan
May, 2004	Child Rights and Our Responsibility		The Children's World Congress on Child Labour Florence, Italy
6 March 2004	Domestic Violence		The Capital Women's Conference London, UK
August, 2003	What is it to be an Indian?		Festival of India Atlanta, USA

==== National ====
Month/Year	Topic	Moderator	Organiser	Link
May, 2024	Fireside Chat with Deepa Mehta	Moderated by Dhamini Ratnam	Kashish Pride Film Festival Liberty Cinema, Mumbai	
September, 2023	Cinema with a Conscience: A Choice	Fire-side chat with Shrinivas Dempo	50th National Management Convention AIMA, New Delhi	
November, 2022	Unconscious Bias	Keynote Speaker	Gartner IT Symposium Kochi	
January, 2020	Disability and Inclusion	Conversation with VR Ferose	India Inclusion Summit Bangalore	https://www.youtube.com/watch?v=1gjC7uVfQfo
June, 2019	A Mother’s Journey with Anger		TEDx Shiv Nadar University Greater NOIDA	https://www.youtube.com/watch?v=_eAie89tAhg
October, 2018	Can Art Change India?		TEDx St. Xaviers Mumbai	https://www.youtube.com/watch?v=m_DA7Zew1QE
May, 2018	Women at Work	Conversation with Anupama Chopra	LinkedIn and Film Companion	https://www.youtube.com/watch?v=Z-3T60l2FLo&t=20s
March, 2016	The Biggest Hypocrisy of our Times: Our Attitude to Poverty		TEDx Walled city New Delhi	https://www.youtube.com/watch?v=V1JeS7MtRpE
September, 2011	Transformation in Education		TEDx Nariman Point Mumbai	https://www.youtube.com/watch?v=LLtvxhhRk50

==== Online ====
Month/Year	Topic	Moderator	Organiser	Link
May, 2022	Break The Bias	Conversation with Sanjay Menon	Publicis Sapient India	https://www.youtube.com/watch?v=65SKLR6dxfs
June 2020	From the Other Side, Fire to Freedom	Raga D’silva		https://www.youtube.com/watch?v=3m4Ea_sV2IM
June 2020	Interrogating Caste Privileges	Conversation with Mauktik Kulkarni hosted by Suraj Yengde	Suraj Yengde presents Dialogics	https://www.youtube.com/watch?v=ILrwlufQTdw
May, 2020	Behind the Camera: Being a Woman Director	Conversation with Kaveree Bamzai	Women in Art & Culture, MAP Bangalore	https://www.youtube.com/watch?v=dIEKr5xCN2c

== Accolades ==
In August 2018, Power Brands awarded Nandita Das the Bharatiya Manavata Vikas Puraskar, for being a polymath with purpose, advocating issues of communal harmony, peace and social justice, especially for women, children and the marginalized "others" through various platforms, for her expressions of courage and compassion on celluloid and her steadfast faith in the power of cinema effecting social change for a better world.

=== For acting ===
List of film acting awards and nominations received by Nandita Das
Year	Award	Film	Category	Result
2000	45th Filmfare Awards	1947 Earth	Best Debut	Won
2001	Santa Monica Film Festival	Bawander	Best Actress	Won
2002	Cairo International Film Festival	Amaar Bhuvan	Best Actress	Won
2002	Tamil Nadu State Film Awards	Kannathil Muthamittal	Special Prize	Won
2006	Nandi Awards of 2006	Kamli	Best Actress	Won
2007	Madrid International Film Festival	Maati Maay (A Grave-keeper's Tale)	Best Actress	Won
2013	8th Lux Style Awards	Ramchand Pakistani	Best Film Actress	Nominated
2013	60th Filmfare Awards South	Neerparavai	Best Supporting Actress – Tamil	Nominated
2024	68th Filmfare Awards South	Virata Parvam	Best Supporting Actress – Telugu	Won

=== For directing ===
List of film directing awards and nominations received by Nandita Das
Year	Award	Film	Category	Status	Ref.
2008	Asian Festival of First Films	Firaaq	Best Film	Won	
2008	Asian Festival of First Films	Firaaq	Best Screenplay	Won	
2008	Asian Festival of First Films	Firaaq	Foreign Correspondents Association Purple Orchid Award for Best Film	Won	
2009	Kara Film Festival	Firaaq	Best Film	Won	
2009	International Film Festival of Kerala	Firaaq	Special Jury Award	Won	
2009	Thessaloniki International Film Festival	Firaaq	Special Prize (Everyday Life: Transcendence or Reconciliation Award)	Won	
2009	Thessaloniki International Film Festival	Firaaq	Golden Alexander	Nominated	
2010	Filmfare Awards	Firaaq	Special Award	Won	
2018	Cannes Film Festival	Manto	Un Certain Regard Award	Nominated	
2018	Toronto International Film Festival	Manto	People's Choice Award	Nominated	
2018	Asia Pacific Screen Award	Manto	FIAPF (Films in the Asia Pacific region)	Won	
2019	Filmfare Awards	Manto	Best Film (Critics)	Nominated	
2019	Filmfare Awards	Manto	Best Screenplay	Nominated	
2019	Filmfare Awards	Manto	Best Dialogue	Nominated	
2024	Filmfare Awards	Zwigato	Best Film (Critics)	Nominated	

== Filmography ==
Key
†	Denotes films that have not yet been released

=== Actor ===
==== Films & Web Series ====
List of film acting credits
Year	Title	Role	Language(s)	Notes
1987	Bangle Box		Hindi	Telefilm
1989	Parinati		Hindi	
1994	Ek Thi Goonja	Goonja	Hindi	
1995	Daughters of This Century	Charu	Hindi	
1998	Fire	Sita	Hindi/English	
1998	1947 Earth	Shanta, the Ayah	Hindi	Filmfare Award for Best Female Debut
1998	Hazaar Chaurasi Ki Maa	Nandini Mitra	Hindi	
1998	Janmadinam	Sarasu	Malayalam	
1999	Biswaprakash	Anjali	Odia	
1999	Deveeri	Deveeri (Akka)	Kannada	
1999	Rockford	Lily Vegas	English	
2000	Punaradhivasam	Shalini	Malayalam	
2000	Hari-Bhari	Afsana	Hindi	
2000	Saanjh		Hindi	Short film
2000	Bawandar	Sanwari	Hindi, Rajasthani, English	Best Actress at Santa Monica Film Festival
2001	Aks	Supriya Verma	Hindi	
2001	Kannaki	Kannaki	Malayalam	
2002	Aamaar Bhuvan	Sakina	Bengali	Best Actress at Cairo Film Festival; Zee Cine Award for Best Actor – Female
2002	Pitaah	Paro	Hindi	
2002	Azhagi	Dhanalakshmi	Tamil	Nominated-Filmfare Award for Best Actress – Tamil
2002	Kannathil Muthamittal	Shyama	Tamil	Tamil Nadu State Film Award Special Prize
2002	Lal Salaam	Rupi(alias Chandrakka)	Hindi	
2002	Solla Marandha Kathai		Tamil	
2003	Ek Alag Mausam	Aparna Verma	Hindi	
2003	Bas Yun Hi	Veda	Hindi	
2003	Supari	Mamta Sikri	Hindi	
2003	Shubho Mahurat	Mallika Sen	Bengali	
2003	Kagaar: Life on the Edge	Aditi	Hindi	
2003	Ek Din 24 Ghante	Sameera Dutta	Hindi	
2004	Vishwa Thulasi	Sita	Tamil	
2004	Ghoom Tana		Urdu	Music Video
2005	Fleeting Beauty	Indian woman	English	
2005	Saayey	Maya	Urdu, English	Short Film
2006	Maati Maay	Chandi	Marathi	Madrid International Film Festival (2007), Best Actress
2006	Podokkhep	Megha	Bengali	
2006	Provoked	Radha Dalal	English	
2006	Kamli	Kamli	Telugu	Nandi Award for Best Actress
2006	Bits & Pieces	Kusum	Hindi	Unreleased
2007	Before the Rains	Sajani	English, Malayalam	
2007	Naalu Pennungal	Kamakshi	Malayalam	
2007	A Drop of Life	Mira Ben	Hindi, Gujarati	Short film
2008	Ramchand Pakistani	Champa	Urdu	Pakistani film
2010	I Am	Afia	Hindi	
2012	Neerparavai	Older Esther	Tamil	Nominated—SIIMA Award for Best Actress in a Supporting Role – Tamil; Nominated—Filmfare Award for Best Supporting Actress – Tamil
2013	Oonga	Hemla	Hindi, Odia	
2014	Rastres de Sàndal	Mina Kuminar	English, Catalan	
2018	Dhaad	Monghi	Gujarati	shot in 2001
2019	Albert Pinto Ko Gussa Kyun Aata Hai?	Stella	Hindi	Remake of classic Albert Pinto Ko Gussa Kyoon Aata Hai
2020	Listen to Her	The woman	Hindi	Short film
2020	Safar		Odia and Gujarati rendition Voiceover	Short film
2021	Call My Agent: Bollywood	Herself	Hindi	Web series
2021	The Cuber	The mother	Hindi, English	Short film
2022	Virata Parvam	Shakunthala	Telugu	Filmfare Award for Best Supporting Actress – Telugu
2023	A Knock on the Door	Reena	English, Hindi, Bengali	
2025	Ziddi Girls	Prof. Handa	Hindi	Web series

==== Theatre & Cineplay ====
Year	Title	Role	Language	Notes
2024	White Rabbit Red Rabbit		English	An unrehearsed play written by Nassim Soleimanpour
2017	Khamosh! Adalat Jaari Hai	Leela Benare	Hindi	Cineplay
2014	Between the Lines	Maya	Hindi, English	Cineplay
2013	Gates to India Song	Anne-Marie Stretter	English	Play by Marguerite Duras and directed by Eric Vigner
2002	The Spirit of Anne Frank	Anamika	English	An improvised play directed by Roysten Abel
	Equus	Jill	English	Play by Peter Shaffer and directed by Barry John
	Heads ya Tails	Madhvi	Hindi	Play by Prashant Dalvi and directed by Chandrakanth Kulkurni
	Mother	The Christian Woman		Play by Maxim Gorky and directed by M K Raina
	Street plays on social issues	Various characters	Hindi	Play by Jana Natya Manch and directed by Safdar Hashmi

=== Director ===
List of film directing credits
Year	Title	Language	Notes	Ref.
1993	Imprint in Clay	Hindi, English	Documentary on the father of Studio Pottery in India, Sardar Gurcharan Singh	
2003	Rain Water Harvesting		Public Service Ad	
2003	Education Spots		Public Service Ad	
2004	Beyond Boundaries - Cricket for Peace	Hindi	Documentary on Indo-Pak street children initiative	
2008	Firaaq	Hindi; Urdu; Gujarati	Best Film and Best Screenplay at Asian Festival of First Films; Purple Orchid Award for Best Film at Asian Festival of First Films; Special Jury Award at International Film Festival of Kerala; Special Prize at International Thessaloniki Film Festival; Filmfare Special Award; Nominated—Golden Alexander at International Thessaloniki Film Festival	
2012	Between the Lines	Hindi, English	Theater Play	She wrote it too
2017	In Defence of Freedom	Hindi	Short film	
2018	Manto	Hindi; Urdu	Premiered at Cannes Film Festival 2018; Toronto International Film Festival 2018; Busan International Film Festival 2018	
2019	India's Got Colour	Hindi	Music Video	
2020	Listen to Her	Hindi	Short film	
2021	The Cuber	Hindi, English	Short film	
2023	Zwigato	Hindi	World premiere at the TIFF 2022; Premiered at Busan International Film Festival; Premiered at International Film Festival of Kerala	

== Voice Works ==
Year	Title	Language	Notes
2004	Karadi Tales	English	Audiobook
2005	The Story of My Experiments with Truth	English	Audiobook
2008	Wonder Pets!	English	Voice of Bengal Tiger

== Books ==
- Manto and I. Aleph Book Company. ISBN 978-81-943657-4-7
- Jatin Das: A Retrospective (1963-2023)
