= Crew (film) =

2024 Indian film by Rajesh A Krishnan

- Theatrical release poster
- Directed by: Rajesh A Krishnan
- Written by: Nidhi Mehra; Mehul Suri
- Produced by: Shobha Kapoor; Anil Kapoor; Ekta Kapoor; Rhea Kapoor
- Starring: Kareena Kapoor Khan; Kriti Sanon; Tabu; Diljit Dosanjh; Kapil Sharma
- Cinematography: Anuj Rakesh Dhawan
- Edited by: Manan Sagar
- Music by: Songs: Diljit Dosanjh; Badshah; Raj Ranjodh; Vishal Mishra; Akshay–IP; Bharg–Rohit; Score: John Stewart Eduri
- Production companies: Balaji Motion Pictures; Anil Kapoor Films & Communication Network
- Distributed by: Pen Marudhar Entertainment
- Release date: 29 March 2024
- Running time: 118 minutes
- Country: India
- Language: Hindi
- Box office: ₹157.08 crore

Crew is a 2024 Indian Hindi-language heist comedy film directed by Rajesh A Krishnan and written by Nidhi Mehra and Mehul Suri. Produced by Ekta Kapoor, Rhea Kapoor, Anil Kapoor, and Digvijay Purohit under Balaji Motion Pictures and Anil Kapoor Films & Communication Network, it stars Kareena Kapoor Khan, Kriti Sanon, and Tabu with Diljit Dosanjh and Kapil Sharma in supporting roles. In the film, three air hostesses become involved in a gold smuggling operation.

Crew was announced in November 2022. Principal photography took place from March 2023 to February 2024. Crew was theatrically released on 29 March 2024 to mostly positive reviews from critics. It became a commercial success, grossing over ₹157.08 crore (US$16 million) globally, making it the sixth highest-grossing Hindi film of 2024. It received three nominations at the 70th Filmfare Awards including Filmfare Award for Best Actress for (Kapoor) and (Tabu).

== Plot ==
Geeta Sethi, Jasmine Kohli, and Divya Rana are flight attendants with Kohinoor Airlines in Mumbai, which is on the verge of bankruptcy. The staff have not been paid their salaries in months, and are still hoping that things will change. Geeta is a former beauty queen married to Arun, both of whom are wealthy until a spat in his family resulted in her having to work as a flight attendant to make ends meet. Arun now runs a struggling food business from home and aspires to own a restaurant in Goa. Geeta has to financially support her unemployed troublemaking brother, Punnu, and his wife, Sapna, as well. Jasmine was raised by her maternal grandfather, Nanu, after her parents divorced and has been hustling to earn money since her school years. She does not believe in relationships, is fond of expensive things, and flaunts a fake and flashy lifestyle on social media while trying to start up her own cosmetics business. Divya is trained to be a pilot but was forced to take up the job of a flight attendant due to a lack of openings and keeps this hidden from her family, while struggling to repay her school loan.

The death of senior flight attendant Rajvanshi, while on duty, leads Geeta, Jasmine, and Divya to a clandestine operation to smuggle gold out of India to the Middle Eastern country, Al Burj. Manoj Mittal, the HR Head of Kohinoor Airlines, is the kingpin of the operation. At Jasmine's insistence after Geeta learns the flight attendants have lost their Provident Fund, the three of them eventually take over for Rajvanshi in the gold smuggling operation by disguising the loot as chocolates, and their financial situations improve: Geeta funds Arun's food business, along with Punnu and Sapna (eventually helping her sister-in-law get a job as a chef and leave her brother); Jasmine buys back Nanu's gold ring from the pawn shop and splurges on herself; Divya pays off her school loan and buys her parents a new car. Meanwhile, the other employees are still struggling.

Someone tips off the customs officials that the three flight attendants are smuggling gold; and even though they hide the stash, the detention that follows makes them feel humiliated and rethink their choice. After Nanu passes away, the friends reconcile as Geeta and Divya comfort Jasmine. The enraged customs official, SI Mala, mentions that her tip is accurate because she received it from an air hostess within Kohinoor, and cannot come to terms with the fact that she could not recover any gold.

The plane in which the three had hidden the stash is exposed one day when turbulence causes damage to the fuselage and the gold falls out. Vijay Walia, the Chairman of Kohinoor Airlines, and Mittal abscond with their gold and flee the country as the news comes out. Initially, Geeta, Jasmine, and Divya accuse their fellow flight attendant, Komal, of tipping off the customs officer, but after an emotional outburst by her, they realise that neither Komal nor their other colleagues were responsible. Geetu remembers that Mittal's wife, Sudha, was also an air hostess and Mala had referred that the tip came from an ex-air hostess; she was the only person who knew about the gold smuggling. They confront Sudha, who reveals that Mittal is cheating on her and to exact revenge, she tipped the customs so that their arrest would also lead to Mittal's arrest. She further reveals that the real kingpin is Walia, who had stolen the airline's money, converted it into gold, and stashed it in Al Burj.

From Sudha, they get the address of Mittal in Al Burj, where they tail him and eventually find Walia at a luxury hotel where his daughter is getting married. Geeta manages to secure a job in the hotel as a housekeeper with Sapna's help and gets information about the gold. After a lot of hard work (and the help of Divya's hacker brother Chintu) the night of the wedding, they come to know that Walia and his family are taking the gold in a private jet to the Cayman Islands. Geeta and Jasmine manage to get the role of air hostesses on the jet, while Divya becomes the pilot. They spike the drinks of the passengers with sleeping pills and land the plane in Divya's native town, Nanheri, where the police and customs officials are already waiting for them. However, the trio manage to keep some gold for themselves and distribute it amongst their friends, colleagues, and loved ones. Mittal also returns to Sudha, along with some of the gold he had stashed for himself.

== Cast ==
- Tabu as Geeta 'Geetu' Sethi, a flight supervisor and Arun's wife
- Kareena Kapoor Khan as Jasmine Kohli, a senior flight attendant (Note: Despite her last name being revealed, she is listed in the credits as "Jasmine".)
- Kriti Sanon as Divya Rana, a junior flight attendant and Jai's love interest (Note: Despite her last name being revealed, she is listed in the credits as "Divya".)
- Diljit Dosanjh as Customs Inspector Jaiveer Singh, Divya's love interest
- Kapil Sharma as Arun Sethi, Geeta's husband, a stay-at-home chef who is bankrupt and jobless
- Saswata Chatterjee as Vijay Walia, Chairman & MD of Kohinoor Airlines Pvt. Ltd
- Rajesh Sharma as Munish Paritosh Mittal, H. R. Head of Kohinoor Airlines
- Kulbhushan Kharbanda as Sadanand Gowda aka Nanu, Jasmine's maternal grandfather
- Trupti Khamkar as SI Mala, an official of the Mumbai Airport Customs Department
- Charu Shankar as Sudha Mittal, Munish's wife
- Garima Yajnik as Ayesha Walia, Vijay's daughter
- Ivan Rodrigues as Mr. Rana, Divya's father
- Suparna Marwah as Divya's mom
- Ramakant Dayama as Mr. Rajvanshi, Geeta's senior
- Pooja Bhamrah as Komal, a junior flight attendant
- Maeha Sharma as Sheetal
- Rahul Gilani as Punnu Baikal, Geeta's brother
- Myra Singh as Child Jasmine
- Hetal A. Puniwala as Group Captain Akil Wadhera
- Badshah as himself in the song "Naina" (cameo appearance)

== Production ==
=== Development ===
In November 2022, producers Ekta Kapoor and Rhea Kapoor announced The Crew, a heist comedy starring Tabu, Kareena Kapoor Khan, and Kriti Sanon in the lead roles. The screenplay was penned by Nidhi Mehra and Mehul Suri. Rajesh A. Krishnan directed the film, which was produced by Ekta Kapoor, Rhea Kapoor, Anil Kapoor, Shobha Kapoor, and Digvijay Purohit under the banners of Balaji Motion Pictures and Anil Kapoor Films & Communication Network.

=== Filming ===
Principal photography commenced on 25 March 2023 and wrapped in February 2024. Shooting took place primarily in Mumbai and Goa with additional sequences filmed in Abu Dhabi. The production team used Deloitte's Hyderabad office to depict the Kohinoor Airlines Mumbai headquarters, while aircraft visuals were digitally altered to feature the fictional airline's branding.

== Music ==
Crew

Soundtrack album by Diljit Dosanjh, Badshah, Raj Ranjodh, Vishal Mishra, Akshay–IP and Bharg–Rohit
- Released: 28 March 2024
- Recorded: 2023
- Genre: Feature film soundtrack
- Length: 25:25
- Language: Hindi
- Label: Tips Music

The music of the film was composed by Diljit Dosanjh, Badshah, Raj Ranjodh, Vishal Mishra, Akshay–IP, Bharg–Rohit while the background score is composed by John Stewart Eduri.

The first single titled "Naina" was released on 5 March 2024. The second single, a remake version of Rajasthani track "Delhi Shahar Mein Maro Ghagro Jo Ghumyo" by Ila Arun, titled "Ghagra" was released on 12 March 2024. A remake of the song "Choli Ke Peeche Kya Hai" from the 1993 film Khal Nayak is sung by Alka Yagnik and Arun, composed by Laxmikant–Pyarelal and written by Anand Bakshi. The third single titled "Choli Ke Peeche" was released on 20 March 2024. The fourth song "Sona Kitna Sona Hai" is a remake of the same name song from the 1997 film Hero No. 1 sung by Udit Narayan and Poornima, composed by Anand–Milind and written by Sameer Anjaan.

Track listing
No.	Title	Lyrics	Music	Singer(s)	Length
1.	"Naina"	Raj Ranjodh, Badshah	Raj Ranjodh	Diljit Dosanjh, Badshah	3:00
2.	"Ghagra"	Juno, Srushti Tawade	Bharg–Rohit	Ila Arun, Romy, Srushti Tawade	3:01
3.	"Choli Ke Peeche"	IP Singh, Anand Bakshi	Akshay-IP, Laxmikant-Pyarelal	Diljit Dosanjh, IP Singh, Alka Yagnik, Ila Arun	2:53
4.	"Kiddan Zaalima"	Raj Shekhar	Vishal Mishra	Vishal Mishra	2:54
5.	"Darbadar"	IP Singh	Akshay-IP	B Praak, Asees Kaur	3:34
6.	"Khwabida"	Bharg	Bharg–Rohit	Badshah, rohh	3:12
7.	"Sona Kitna Sona Hai"	IP Singh	Akshay-IP	IP Singh, Nupoor Khedkar	3:24
8.	"Sona Kitna Sona Hai" (Reprise)	IP Singh	Akshay-IP	IP Singh	3:28
Total length:					25:25

== Release ==
=== Theatrical ===
Initially planned for a 22 March 2024 release, the film was theatrically released on 29 March 2024 coinciding with Good Friday.

=== Home media ===
The film began streaming on Netflix from 24 May 2024.

== Reception ==
=== Box office ===
As of 22 May 2024, Crew has grossed ₹107.05 crore (US$11 million) in India, with a further ₹50.03 crore (US$5.2 million) overseas, for a worldwide total of ₹157.08 crore (US$16 million).

On its opening day, Crew earned ₹10.28 crore (US$1.1 million) at the domestic box office, marking the third biggest opening day collection for a female-led film. Furthermore, the film opened with a global box office gross of ₹20.07 crore (US$2.1 million), making it the highest opening day grosser for a Hindi female-led film globally.

=== Critical response ===
Crew received mostly positive reviews from critics. On the review aggregator website Rotten Tomatoes, 67% of 15 critics' reviews are positive, with an average rating of 6.8/10.

Shubhra Gupta of The Indian Express praised the lead actresses, writing, "Tabu, so comfortable in her older woman avatar as the senior-most of the crew, and Khan, treading the thin line between greed and need with ease, are a riot; Sanon, in their company, is boosted and manages to hold her own." Gupta gave the movie 3.5 stars out of 5 and described it as an "easy-breezy" comedy that washes away the stench of recent Bollywood duds. Devesh Sharma of Filmfare gave the film 3.5 stars out of 5 and wrote, "Tabu-Kareena Kapoor-Kriti Sanon-starrer Crew totally smashes through stereotypes. It's an honest-to-goodness rollercoaster ride". Titas Chowdhury of CNN-IBN gave the film 3.5 stars out of 5 and particularly praised Kapoor Khan's performance, adding that she elevates the narrative several notches with a character that is tailor-made for her. Zinia Bandyopadhyay of India Today gave the film 3.5 stars out of 5 and wrote, "In times when political dramas are trying to make a statement abound, Crew is a welcome change. It’s light, easy-breezy and stays true to being a masala entertainer." The critic based at Bollywood Hungama awarded the film 3.5 stars out of 5 and wrote, "Crew is a fun entertainer and rests on the fine performances of Tabu, Kareena Kapoor Khan and Kriti Sanon." Renuka Vyavahare of The Times of India gave it 3.5 stars (out of 5), describing it as a crime comedy that is funny, frivolous, and delectable. In a more critical review, Saibal Chatterjee of NDTV gave the film 2 stars out of 5 and noted that the film's screenplay lacks sheen.

Anuj Kumar of The Hindu deemed it a feel-good film and particularly praised Kapoor Khan's performance, adding that she is the tour de force of the film. Monika Rawal Kukreja of Hindustan Times wrote, "Crew makes you laugh, and have fun while serving some cheesy and cocky humour, and manages to stay afloat despite a lot of turbulence, all thanks to the threesome that you wish lasted a little longer." Nandini Ramnath of Scroll gave the film a positive review, calling it funny, sexy, and honest—all without being overly mushy or judgemental.

== Accolades ==
Year	Award	Category	Nominee/Work	Result	Ref.
2025	70th Filmfare Awards	Best Actress	Kareena Kapoor Khan	Nominated	
2025	70th Filmfare Awards	Best Actress	Tabu	Nominated	
2025	70th Filmfare Awards	Best Costume Design	Manisha Melwani, Chandini Whabi, Meagan Concessio, Abhilasha Devnani Baweja	Nominated	
