= Anchal Bhateja =

Indian lawyer and disability rights advocate

Anchal Bhateja is an Indian lawyer and disability rights advocate. She is recognised as the first blind woman to argue a case before the Supreme Court of India in June 2025.

== Early life and education ==
Bhateja was born in India. She was born with low vision, which worsened over time due to retinopathy of prematurity. She lost her eyesight completely before her Class X board examinations.

Despite the challenges, she topped her Class XII examinations and qualified for the Common Law Admission Test (CLAT). She went on to study law at the National Law School of India University (NLSIU), Bengaluru, becoming the institution’s first visually impaired student. She graduated with a B.A. LL.B. (Honours) degree in 2023.

== Career ==
Bhateja initially worked in the Tech Disputes Team at Shardul Amarchand Mangaldas & Co. before joining the Vidhi Centre for Legal Policy as a research fellow.

On 6 June 2025, she became the first blind woman to argue before the Supreme Court of India. The case involved a challenge to the Uttarakhand Judicial Service recruitment policy, which excluded persons with blindness and other disabilities from eligibility under reserved categories for Persons with Benchmark Disabilities (PwBD). The matter was heard by Justices Sanjay Karol and S. C. Sharma.

== Advocacy ==
Bhateja has consistently advocated for disability rights and digital accessibility. She relies on assistive technologies such as screen readers, audiobooks, and Braille in her legal work.

She also mentors visually impaired law students and has contributed articles to publications including Deccan Herald, The Wire, and The Leaflet. Her advocacy extends to issues of inclusivity, accessibility, and queer rights.
