= Vikas Kumar =

Indian actor and dialogue coach

Vikash Kumar Singh
- Born: Nalanda, Bihar, India
- Education: MBA
- Occupations: Actor; Producer; Dialogue coach
- Years active: 2006 - present
- Spouse: Raavi Sehgal
- Children: 1

Vikas Kumar is an Indian actor, producer and dialogue coach. He is known mainly for his performances as Senior Inspector Rajat in CID, ACP Khan in the Emmy Awards-nominated Aarya, Senior Inspector Damodar Deshmukh in YRF TV's Khotey Sikkey, Abhay in Hamid, Major Prem in Parmanu: The Story of Pokhran, Santosh in the Netflix series “Kaala Paani”, and for his work as a dialogue coach in Hindi films like Ishqiya, Shakuntala Devi and Udaan.

== Personal life ==
Kumar was born in Nalanda and his father was a doctor in Bihar.

He did his primary schooling from Hillgrange Preparatory School in Dehradun. After which he did his senior schooling from Welham Boys' School, Dehradun. He also and holds an MBA degree. He did a three-month acting workshop under the renowned theater director Barry John.

He married Raavi Sehgal, and the couple is blessed with a daughter, Rabani.

== Career ==
He had worked as a theatre artist in various plays, including ‘The Legend of Ram– Prince of India’, ‘The Fifty Day War’, ‘Kamra Number 420’ and ‘Khamosh! Adalat Jaari Hai.’ Vikas Kumar with the cast and crew of ‘The Legend of Ram- Prince of India’ were felicitated by the then President of India, Dr A.P.J. Abdul Kalam in 2004.

He had acted in a few TV serials, like ‘Powder’ (2010) in which he played the character of Umesh Jagdale and ‘Khotey Sikkey’ (2011) in which he played the character of Senior Inspector Damodar Deshmukh. He is popular for playing the character of Senior Inspector Rajat in one of the longest-running TV shows, ‘CID’ in 2012–2013.

He has appeared in the Hindi films like Handover (2012), Prithipal Singh- A Story (2015), Ajji (2017), and Parmanu: The Story of Pokhran (2018).

He appeared in the popular Disney+ Hotstar web-series, ‘Aarya,’ in which he played the role of ACP Younus Khan in 2020. He also produced a short film ‘Sonsi’ (Shadow Bird), won 'Best Film' award at the Bengaluru International Short Film Festival 2021, 'Best Cinematography' (Non-Feature category) in 67th National Awards and was declared 'Best Short Film' at Lady Filmmakers Festival, Beverly Hills.

He is a well-known dialogue coach in Bollywood and his debut as a dialect coach was ‘Gulaal’ (2009). He had worked as a dialect teacher for Vidya Balan in ‘Ishqiya’ (2010), Kalki Koechlin in ‘Zindagi Na Milegi Dobara’ (2011), Lisa Haydon in ‘The Shaukeens’ (2014), and Aditya Roy Kapur in ‘Fitoor’ (2016).

== Filmography ==
=== Films ===
Year	Title	Role	Notes	Ref.
2006	Shanu Taxi	Shanu	Short film	
2012	Handover	Ratan Das		
2015	Prithipal Singh..A Story	Prithipal Singh		
2016	ABS NT	Iqbal	Short film	
2017	Ajji	Inspector Dastur		
2018	Hamid	Abhay	Urdu film	
2018	Parmanu: The Story of Pokhran	Major Prem Singh / Bheem Rajat		
2019	Shakai	Investigator	Short film	
2021	The Knot	Shirish Mathur		
2021	Dhamaka	Praveen Kamat		

=== Television ===
Year	Title	Role	Notes	Ref.
2010	Powder	Sr. Inspector Umesh Jagdale		
2011	Khotey Sikkey	Sr. Inspector Damodar Deshmuk		
2011	Adaalat	Sr. Inspector Damodar Deshmuk	Special appearance	
2012-2013	CID	Sr. Inspector Rajat		
2014	Taarak Mehta Ka Ooltah Chashmah	Sr. Inspector Rajat	Special appearance	
2014	CID Vs Adaalat – Karmyudh	Sr. Inspector Rajat	Telefilm	
2019	Court Room - Sachchai Hazir Ho	Host		

=== Web series ===
Year	Title	Role	Notes	Ref.
2020–present	Aarya	ACP Younus Khan	3 seasons	
2022	Delhi Khabbar	Danny Singh		
2023	Kaala Paani	Santosh Savla		

=== Producer ===
Year	Title	Notes	Ref.
2020	Sonsi	Short film	
2022	Shera	Short film	
2023	Going Solo	Documentary	
2024	Himalaya Ki Peeth Par	Documentary	
2026	Lovers in the Blue Night	Directed by Anuparna Roy	

=== Dialogue coach ===
Year	Title	Notes	Ref.
2006	One Night With The King	English film	
2009	Gulaal		
2009	Radio: Love on Air		
2010	Udaan		
2010	Ishqiya		
2011	Zindagi Na Milegi Dobara		
2011	7 Khoon Maaf		
2012	Cover Story: The Ultimate Interview		
2013	Aurangzeb		
2013	Ishk Actually		
2014	MAD: Mad About Dance		
2014	The Shaukeens		
2014	Main Aur Mr. Riight		
2016	Fitoor		

== Awards and nominations ==
Year	Award	Category	Film	Result	Ref.
2021	New York Indian Film Festival	Best Actor	The Knot	Nominated	
