= 2019 Zee Cine Awards =

Indian film awards ceremony

Zee Cine Awards 2019
- Date: 19 March 2019
- Site: MMRDA Grounds, BKC, Mumbai, India
- Hosted by: Kartik Aaryan; Vicky Kaushal; Malaika Arora; Ayushmann Khurrana; Aparshakti Khurana
- Official website: Zee Cine Awards 2019

Highlights
- Best Film: Jury's choice: Raazi
- Best Film: Viewers' choice: Sanju
- Best Direction: Sanjay Leela Bhansali for Padmaavat
- Best Actor: Ranveer Singh for Padmaavat
- Best Actress: Alia Bhatt for Raazi
- Most awards: Padmaavat (6)
- Most nominations: Padmaavat (14)

Television coverage
- Channel: Zee Cinema

The Zee Cine Awards 2019 ceremony celebrated the best of Indian Hindi-language films of 2018. The ceremony was held on 19 March 2019 at the MMDRA Ground at the Bandra Kurla Complex in Mumbai and broadcast on 31 March 2019 on Zee Cinema. The main hosts of the event were Kartik Aaryan and Vicky Kaushal, while Malaika Arora, Ayushmann Khurrana, and Aparshakti Khurana hosted a segment each.

Padmaavat led the ceremony with 14 nominations, followed by Andhadhun and Raazi with 9 nominations each, and Dhadak and Stree with 8 nominations each.

Padmaavat won 6 awards, including Best Director (for Sanjay Leela Bhansali) and Best Actor (for Ranveer Singh), thus becoming the most-awarded film at the ceremony.

== Winners and nominees ==
Winners are listed first and highlighted in boldface.

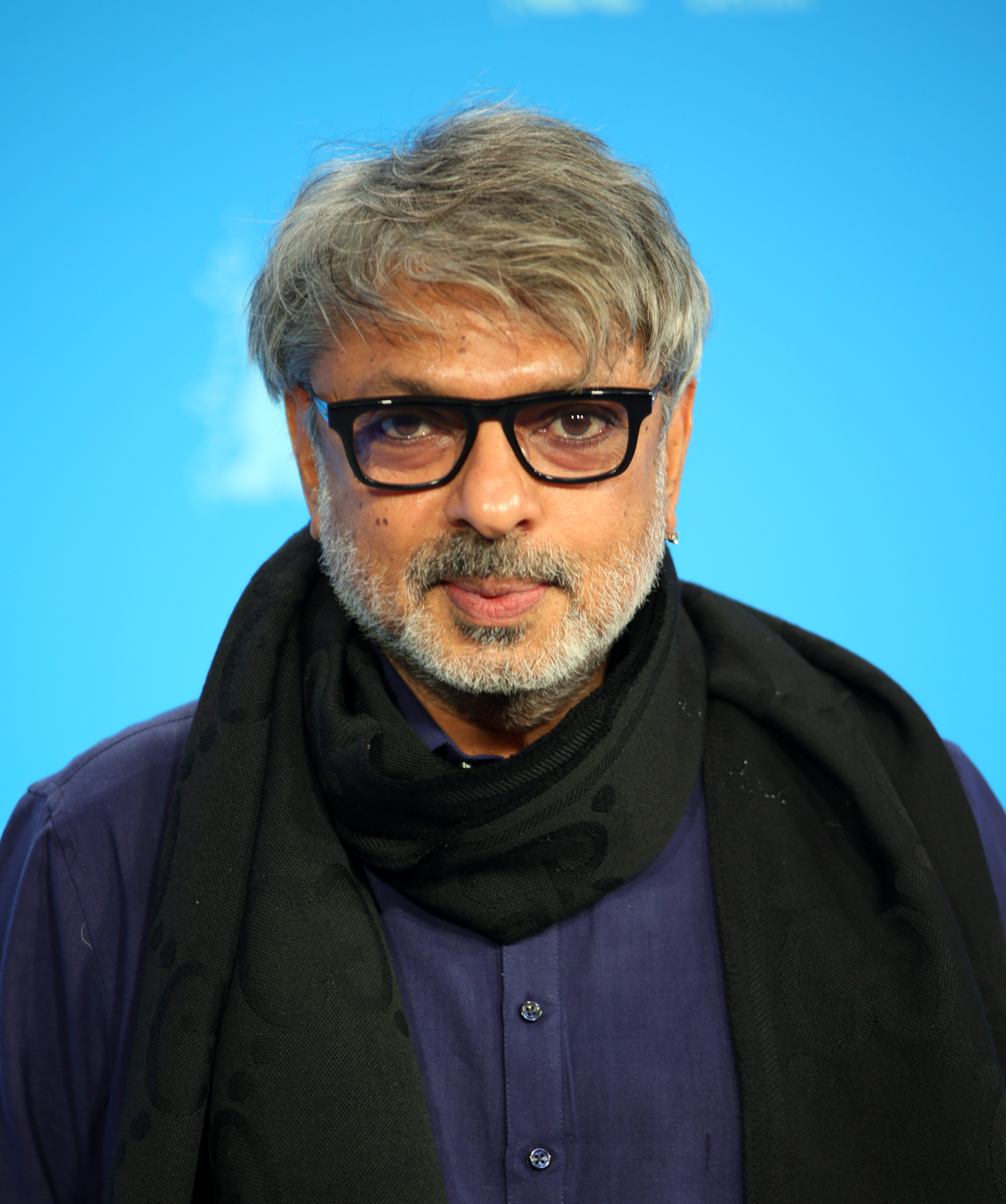
Sanjay Leela Bhansali — Best Director winner for Padmaavat

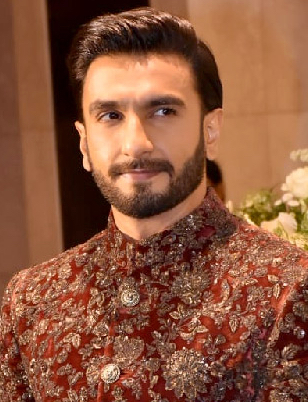
Ranveer Singh — Best Actor winner for Padmaavat

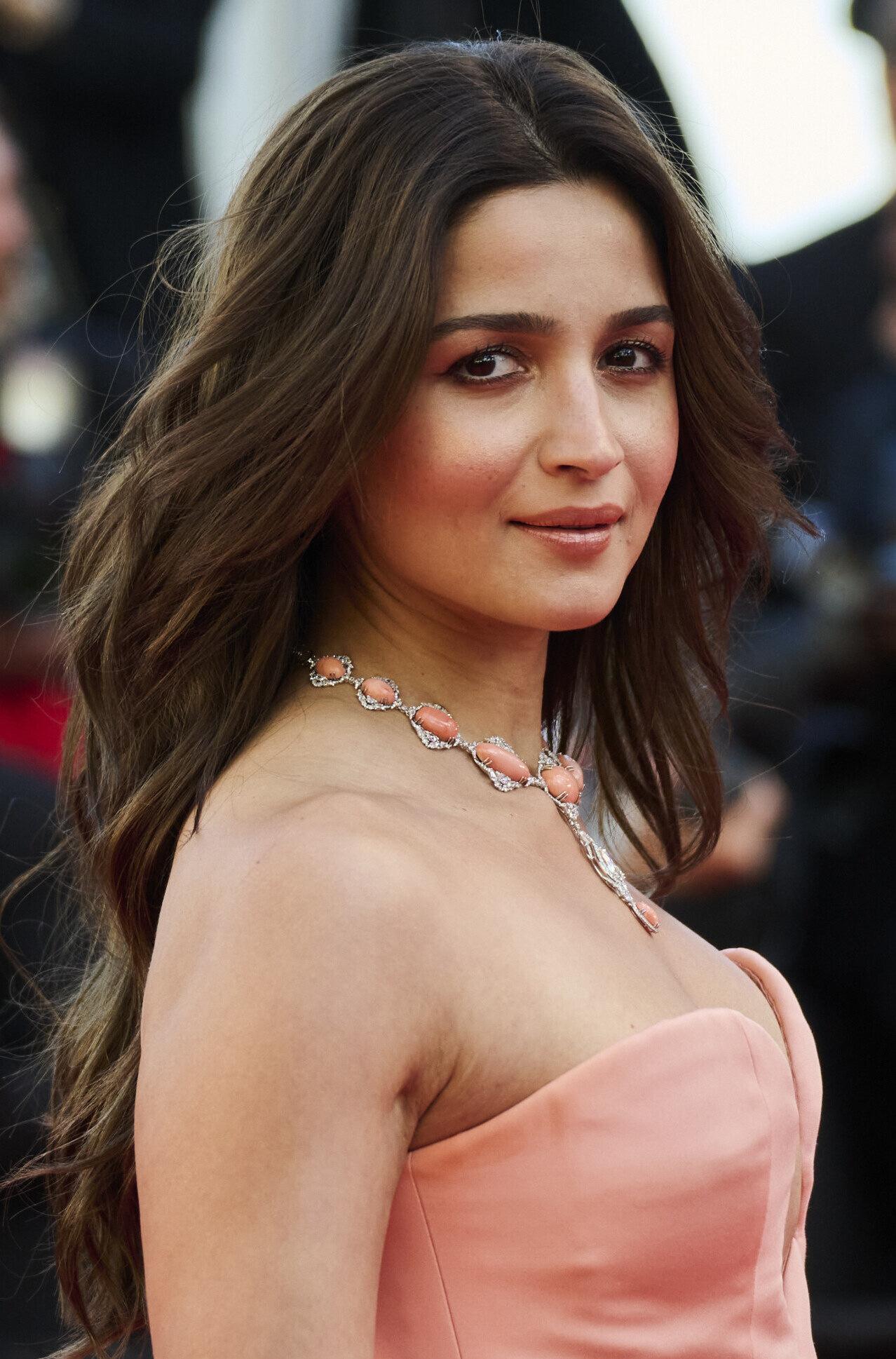
Alia Bhatt — Best Actress winner for Raazi

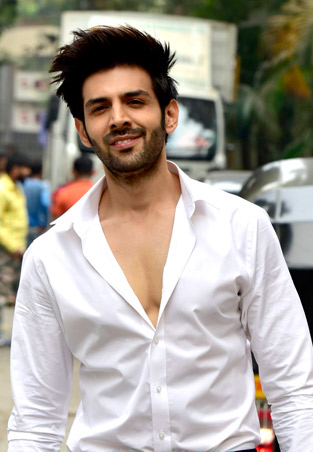
Kartik Aaryan — Best Actor in Comic Role winner for Sonu Ke Titu Ki Sweety

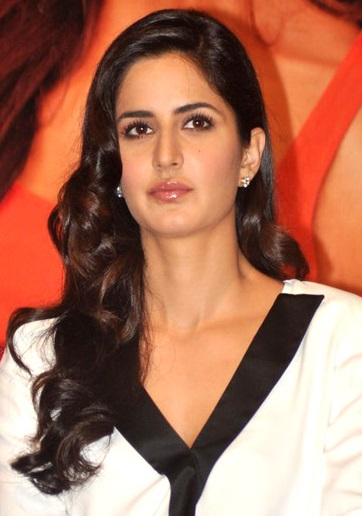
Katrina Kaif — Best Supporting Actress winner for Zero

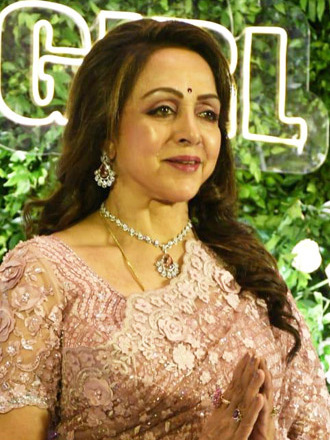
Hema Malini — Lifetime Achievement Award recipient

=== Popular awards ===
Best Film	Best Director
**Sanju – Vidhu Vinod Chopra and Rajkumar Hirani**; Badhaai Ho – Hemant Bhandari, Vineet Jain and Amit Sharma; Padmaavat – Sanjay Leela Bhansali, Ajit Andhare and Sudhanshu Vats; Simmba – Hiroo Yash Johar, Karan Johar, Apoorva Mehta and Rohit Shetty; Stree – Krishna D.K., Raj Nidimoru and Dinesh Vijan	**Sanjay Leela Bhansali – Padmaavat**; Amit Sharma – Badhaai Ho; Anubhav Sinha – Mulk; Meghna Gulzar – Raazi; Rohit Shetty – Simmba; Sriram Raghavan – Andhadhun
Best Actor – Male	Best Actor – Female
**Ranveer Singh – Padmaavat as Alauddin Khilji**; Ayushmann Khurrana – Andhadhun as Akash; Kartik Aaryan – Sonu Ke Titu Ki Sweety as Sonu Sharma; Ranbir Kapoor – Sanju as Sanjay Dutt; Ranveer Singh – Simmba as Sangram Bhalerao; Varun Dhawan – Sui Dhaaga: Made in India as Mauji Sharma	**Alia Bhatt – Raazi as Sehmat Khan**; Deepika Padukone – Padmaavat as Padmavati; Anushka Sharma – Sui Dhaaga: Made in India as Mamta Sharma; Kareena Kapoor Khan – Veere Di Wedding as Kalindi Puri; Sonam Kapoor Ahuja – Veere Di Wedding as Avni Sharma; Taapsee Pannu – Mulk as Aarti Malhotra
Best Supporting Actor – Male	Best Supporting Actor – Female
**Vicky Kaushal – Sanju as Kamlesh Kanhaiyalal Kapasi**; Jaideep Ahlawat – Raazi as Khalid Mir; Manoj Pahwa – Mulk as Bilaal Ali Mohammed; Pankaj Tripathi – Stree as Rudra; Paresh Rawal – Sanju as Sunil Dutt; Ravi Kishan – Mukkabaaz as Sanjay Kumar	**Katrina Kaif – Zero as Babita Kumari**; Ashwini Kalsekar – Andhadhun as Rasika Jawanda; Gitanjali Rao – October as Vidya Iyer; Radhika Apte – Andhadhun as Sophie; Shikha Talsania – Veere Di Wedding as Meera; Surekha Sikri – Badhaai Ho as Dadi
Best Actor in a Comic Role	Best Actor in a Negative Role
**Kartik Aaryan – Sonu Ke Titu Ki Sweety as Sonu Sharma**; Abhishek Banerjee – Stree as Jaana; Aparshakti Khurana – Stree as Bittu; Jackky Bhagnani – Mitron as Jai; Jimmy Sheirgill – Happy Phirr Bhag Jayegi as Daman Singh Bagga; Piyush Mishra – Happy Phirr Bhag Jayegi as Usman Afridi	**Tabu – Andhadhun as Simi**; Jim Sarbh – Padmaavat as Malik Kafur; Jimmy Sheirgill – Mukkabaaz as Bhagwandas Mishra; Manoj Bajpai – Baaghi 2 as DIG Ajay Sheirgill; Saurabh Shukla – Raid as Rameshwar Singh; Sohum Shah – Tumbbad as Vinayak Rao; Sonu Sood – Simmba as Doorvva Yashwanth Ranade
Best Music	Best Lyrics
**Ajay–Atul – Dhadak**; Amaal Mallik, Guru Randhawa, Rochak Kohli, Yo Yo Honey Singh, Zack Knight and Saurabh–Vaibhav – Sonu Ke Titu Ki Sweety; Amit Trivedi – Kedarnath; Amit Trivedi – Manmarziyaan; Sanjay Leela Bhansali – Padmaavat; Shankar–Ehsaan–Loy – Raazi; Tanishk Bagchi, Lijo George-DJ Chetas and JAM8 – Loveyatri	**Gulzar – "Dilbaro" (Raazi)**; A. M. Turaz – "Ek Dil Ek Jaan" (Padmaavat); Amitabh Bhattacharya – "Dhadak" (Dhadak); Gulzar – "Ae Watan" (Raazi); Irshad Kamil – "Mere Naam Tu" (Zero); Javed Akhtar – "Main Zinda Hoon" (Paltan)
Best Playback Singer – Male	Best Playback Singer – Female
**Yasser Desai – "Naino Ne Baandhi" (Gold)**; Abhay Jodhpurkar – "Mere Naam Tu" (Zero); Ajay Gogavale – "Dhadak" (Dhadak); Arijit Singh – "Ae Watan" (Raazi); Darshan Raval – "Chogada" (Loveyatri); Sukhwinder Singh – "Kar Har Maidaan Fateh" (Sanju)	**Harshdeep Kaur and Vibha Saraf – "Dilbaro" (Raazi)**; Asees Kaur – "Akh Lad Jaave" (Loveyatri); Neha Kakkar – "Aankh Maarey" (Simmba); Neha Kakkar and Dhvani Bhanushali – "Dilbar" (Satyameva Jayate); Shreya Ghoshal – "Dhadak" (Dhadak); Shreya Ghoshal – "Ghoomar" (Padmaavat)
Best Track of the Year
**"Aankh Maarey" (Simmba)**; "Bom Diggy Diggy" (Sonu Ke Titu Ki Sweety); "Chogada" (Loveyatri); "Dilbar" (Satyameva Jayate); "Tareefan" (Veere Di Wedding); "Zingaat" (Dhadak)

=== Debut awards ===
Best Debut Director
**Amar Kaushik – Stree**; Gauravv K Chawla – Baazaar; Prosit Roy – Pari; Rahi Anil Barve and Adesh Prasad – Tumbbad
Best Debut – Male	Best Debut – Female
**Ishaan Khatter – Beyond the Clouds as Amir and Dhadak as Madhukar Bhagla**; Aayush Sharma – Loveyatri as Sushrut; Dulquer Salmaan – Karwaan as Avinash; Rohan Mehra – Baazaar as Rizwan Ahmed	**Janhvi Kapoor – Dhadak as Parthavi Singh**; Mouni Roy – Gold as Monobina Das; Radhika Madan – Pataakha as Champa Kumari; Sara Ali Khan – Kedarnath as Mandakani Mishra; Warina Hussain – Loveyatri as Michelle; Zoya Hussain – Mukkabaaz as Sunaina Mishra

=== Technical awards ===
Best Story	Best Screenplay
Sriram Raghavan, Arijit Biswas, Yogesh Chandekar, Hemanth Rao and Pooja Ladha Surti – Andhadhun	**Sriram Raghavan, Arijit Biswas, Yogesh Chandekar, Hemanth Rao and Pooja Ladha Surti – Andhadhun**
Best Dialogue	Best Cinematography
Sumit Arora – Stree	**Sudeep Chatterjee – Padmaavat**
Best Choreography	Best Action
Jyothi D. Tomar and Kruti Mahesh Midya – "Ghoomar" (Padmaavat)	**Ahmed Khan, Kecha Khampadkee, Ram Chella, Lakshman Chella and Shamsher Khan – Baaghi 2**
Best Sound Design	Best Background Score
Bishwadeep Chatterjee, Justin Jose and Nihar Ranjan Samal – Padmaavat	**Daniel B. George – Andhadhun**
Best Editing	Best Visual Effects
Pooja Ladha Surti – Andhadhun	**Red Chillies VFX – Zero**
Best Production Design
Nitin Zihani Choudhary and Rakesh Yadav – Tumbbad

=== Critics' awards ===
Best Film
**Raazi – Vineet Jain, Hiroo Yash Johar, Karan Johar and Apoorva Mehta**
Best Actor – Male	Best Actor – Female
**Ranbir Kapoor – Sanju as Sanjay Dutt**	**Deepika Padukone – Padmaavat as Padmavati**

=== Special awards ===
Lifetime Achievement Award
- **Hema Malini**
Extraordinary Jodi of the Year
- **Neena Gupta and Gajraj Rao – Badhaai Ho as Priyamvada Kaushik and Jeetender Kaushik**
Extraordinary Icon for Social Change
- **Sonam Kapoor Ahuja – Pad Man as Pari Walia**
Extraordinary Performance of the Year
- **Ayushmann Khurrana – Andhadhun as Akash**

== Superlatives ==
Multiplenominations
Nominations	Film
14	Padmaavat
10	Andhadhun
10	Raazi
8	Dhadak
8	Stree
7	Simmba
6	Badhaai Ho
6	Loveyatri
6	Sanju
5	Sonu Ke Titu Ki Sweety
5	Veere Di Wedding
4	Mulk
4	Zero
3	Mukkabaaz
3	Satyameva Jayate
3	Tumbbad
2	Baazaar
2	Gold
2	Happy Phirr Bhag Jayegi
2	Kedarnath
2	Manmarziyaan
2	October
2	Pari
2	Sui Dhaaga: Made in India

Multiplewins
Wins	Film
6	Padmaavat
5	Andhadhun
4	Raazi
3	Dhadak
3	Sanju
2	Stree
2	Zero

== Performers and presenters ==
The following individuals performed musical numbers or presented awards.

=== Performers ===
Name(s)	Performed
Kartik Aaryan	"Poster Lagwa Do" (Luka Chuppi) "Dil Chori" (Sonu Ke Titu Ki Sweety) "Photo" (Luka Chuppi) "Bom Diggy Diggy" (Sonu Ke Titu Ki Sweety) "Coca-Cola" (Luka Chuppi) "Mehrma" (Love Aaj Kal) "Kaun Nachdi" (Sonu Ke Titu Ki Sweety) "Baanwre" (Pyaar Ka Punchnama) "Haan Mein Galat" (Love Aaj Kal (2020 film)) "Daru Vich Pyar" (Guest iin London) "Ankhiyon Se Goli Mare" (Pati Patni Aur Woh (2019 film))
Varun Dhawan	"Muqabla" (Street Dancer 3D) "Hindustani" (Street Dancer 3D) "First Class" (Kalank) "Palat Tera Hero Idhar Hai" (Main Tera Hero)
Aditya Roy Kapur	"Tu Hi Hai" (Aashiqui 2) "Surma Surma" (Malang (film)) "Hui Malang" (Malang (film))
Shahid Kapoor	"Tera Ban Jaunga" (Kabir Singh) "Aadha Adhora" (Vivah) "Main Rang Sharbaton" (Phata Poster Nikhla Hero) "Pump It Up" (Chance Pe Dance) "Bekhayali" (Kabir Singh)
Vicky Kaushal	"Challa" (Uri: The Surgical Strike) "Dil Maang Raha Hai" (Bhoot – Part One: The Haunted Ship) "Pachitaoge" (Pachitaoge) "Sacchi Mohabbat" (Manmarziyaan)
Ayushmann Khurrana	"Don't Be Shy" (Bala (2019 film)) "Gabru" (Shubh Mangal Zyada Saavdhan) "Ooh La La " (Shubh Mangal Zyada Saavdhan) "Radhe Radhe" (Dream Girl (2019 film))
Arjun Kapoor	"Locha-E-Ulfat" (2 States) "Tere Liye" (Namaste England) "Mard Maratha" (Panipat (film))
Sara Ali Khan	"Aankh Maarey" (Simmba) "Tere Bin" (Simmba) "Sweetheart" (Kedarnath)
Akshay Kumar	"Shaitan Ka Saala" (Housefull 4) "Chinta Ta Chita" (Rowdy Rathore) "Bhool Bhulaiyaa" (Bhool Bhulaiyaa) "Ek Chumma" (Housefull 4) "Wallah Re Wallah" (Tees Maar Khan) "Ve Maahi" (Kesari (2019 film)) "Subha Hone Na De" (Desi Boyz) "Sauda Khara Khara" (Good Newwz (soundtrack))

=== Presenters ===
Name(s)	Presented
Elnaaz Norouzi; Ashwini Kalsekar	Zee Cine Award for Best Cinematography; Zee Cine Award for Best Action
Ankita Lokhande; Jackky Bhagnani	Zee Cine Award for Best Production Design; Zee Cine Award for Best Visual Effects
Nora Fatehi	Zee Cine Award for Best Editing; Zee Cine Award for Best Background Score
Arbaaz Khan; Giorgia Andriani	Zee Cine Award for Best Sound Design; Zee Cine Award for Best Dialogue; Best Film Writing (Story and Screenplay)
Neeraj Akhoury; Kiara Advani	Zee Cine Award for Best Choreography
Chitrangada Singh	Zee Cine Award for Best Debut Director
Punit Misra; Himesh Reshammiya	Zee Cine Award for Extraordinary Jodi of the Year
Jatin Pandit; Shilpa Rao	Zee Cine Award for Best Playback Singer – Female
Keyur Virani; Sophie Choudry	Zee Cine Award for Best Playback Singer – Male
Ahmed Khan; Neena Gupta	Zee Cine Award for Best Actor in a Negative Role
Vineet Jain; Arjun Rampal; Dino Morea	Zee Cine Award for Best Actor in a Comic Role
Jim Sarbh; Diya Mirza	Zee Cine Award for Best Debut – Female; Zee Cine Award for Best Debut – Male
Boney Kapoor	Zee Cine Award for Best Supporting Actor – Female
Kriti Sanon	Zee Cine Award for Best Supporting Actor – Male
Janhvi Kapoor; Ishaan Khatter	Zee Cine Award for Extraordinary Icon for Social Change
Udit Narayan; Pooja Hegde	Zee Cine Award for Best Lyrics; Zee Cine Award for Best Music
Amar Singh; Punit Misra	Zee Cine Award for Extraordinary Contribution to Indian Cinema
Alia Bhatt	Zee Cine Award for Best Actor – Male
Sanjay Leela Bhansali; Ranveer Singh	Zee Cine Award for Best Actor – Female
Katrina Kaif	Zee Cine Award for Extraordinary Performance of the Year
Madhuri Dixit	Zee Cine Award for Best Film
Deepika Padukone	Zee Cine Award for Best Director
Ashish Sehgal; Shariq Patel	Zee Cine Award for Song of the Year
Subhash Ghai	Zee Cine Award for Viewers' Choice Best Film; Zee Cine Award for Viewers' Choice Best Actor – Female
Sanjay Leela Bhansali	Zee Cine Award for Viewers' Choice Best Actor – Male

== See also ==
- 64th Filmfare Awards
- 25th Screen Awards
