= List of accolades received by Padmaavat =

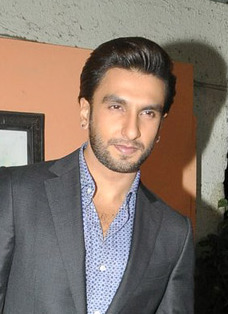
- Ranveer Singh won several awards for his role as Sultan Alauddin Khalji.
Accolades
Award	Won	Nominated
Asiavision Awards	2	2
Filmfare Awards	4	17
HELLO! Hall of Fame Awards	3	3
Indian Film Festival of Melbourne	0	5
International Indian Film Academy Awards	2	8
Mirchi Music Awards	8	21
National Film Awards	3	3
Screen Awards	3	4
Zee Cine Awards	4	5
- Total number of awards and nominations (Note: Awards in certain categories do not have prior nominations and only winners are announced by the jury. For simplification and to avoid errors, each award in this list has been presumed to have had a prior nomination.)
Totals	25	68
- References

Padmaavat is a 2018 Indian Hindi-language epic period drama film directed and produced by Sanjay Leela Bhansali. The film stars Deepika Padukone as Rani Padmavati, Shahid Kapoor as Maharawal Ratan Singh and Ranveer Singh as Sultan Alauddin Khilji and features Aditi Rao Hydari, Jim Sarbh, Raza Murad, and Anupriya Goenka in supporting roles. The film's screenplay was written by Bhansali and Prakash Kapadia. Bhansali also composed the soundtrack of the film, with lyrics written by A. M. Turaz, Siddharth-Garima and Swaroop Khan. The original score of the film is composed by Sanchit Balhara. Padmaavat was edited by Rajesh G. Pandey while Sudeep Chatterjee is its cinematographer. Set in medieval Rajasthan in 1303 AD, Queen Padmavati of Mewar is married to a noble king and they live in a prosperous fortress with their subjects until an ambitious Sultan hears of Padmavati's beauty and becomes obsessed with having her.

Made on a budget of ₹2.15 billion (US$25 million), Padmaavat was released on 25 January 2018 in 2D, 3D and IMAX 3D formats, making it the first Indian film to be released in IMAX 3D. Despite not being released in some states of India, it grossed over ₹5.85 billion (US$67 million) at the box office, becoming a commercial success and one of the highest-grossing Indian films of all time. The film won 25 awards from 68 nominations; its music, and the performance of Singh have received the most attention from award groups.

At the 66th National Film Awards, Padmaavat earned three awards – Best Music Direction, Best Male Playback Singer and Best Choreography. At the 64th Filmfare Awards, Padmaavat received 18 nominations, winning four awards – Best Actor (Critics), Best Music Director, Best Female Playback Singer and Best Choreography. At the 2018 Screen Awards, Padmaavat was nominated in four categories, winning Best Actor, Best Female Playback and Best Choreography. Padmaavat also won two awards at the 20th ceremony of the International Indian Film Academy Awards – Best Actor and Best Supporting Actress. At the 2019 Zee Cine Awards ceremony, the film won four awards – Best Actor, Best Actress, Best Director and Best Choreography. The film garnered twenty-one nominations at the 11th Mirchi Music Awards and won eight awards, including Song of The Year and Album of The Year. It also received five nominations for Best Film, Best Director, Best Actress and Best Actor for both Singh and Kapoor at the Indian Film Festival of Melbourne, but did not win any of the awards.

== List of accolades ==
Award	Date of ceremony (Note: Each date is linked to the article about the awards held that year, wherever possible.)	Category	Recipient(s)	Result	Ref.
Asiavision Awards	16 February 2019	Best Actor	Ranveer Singh	Won	
Asiavision Awards	16 February 2019	Best Actor in a Negative Role	Jim Sarbh	Won	
Filmfare Awards	23 March 2019	Best Film	Padmaavat	Nominated	
Filmfare Awards	23 March 2019	Best Director	Sanjay Leela Bhansali	Nominated	
Filmfare Awards	23 March 2019	Best Actor	Ranveer Singh	Nominated	
Filmfare Awards	23 March 2019	Best Actor (Critics)	Ranveer Singh	Won	
Filmfare Awards	23 March 2019	Best Actress	Deepika Padukone	Nominated	
Filmfare Awards	23 March 2019	Best Supporting Actor	Jim Sarbh	Nominated	
Filmfare Awards	23 March 2019	Best Music Director	Sanjay Leela Bhansali	Won	
Filmfare Awards	23 March 2019	Best Lyricist	A. M. Turaz – "Binte Dil"	Nominated	
Filmfare Awards	23 March 2019	Best Male Playback Singer	Arijit Singh – "Binte Dil"	Nominated	
Filmfare Awards	23 March 2019	Best Female Playback Singer	Shreya Ghoshal – "Ghoomar"	Won	
Filmfare Awards	23 March 2019	Best Choreography	Kruti Mahesh and Jyoti D Tommar – "Ghoomar"	Won	
Filmfare Awards	23 March 2019	Best Choreography	Ganesh Acharya – "Khalibali"	Nominated	
Filmfare Awards	23 March 2019	Best Cinematography	Sudeep Chatterjee	Nominated	
Filmfare Awards	23 March 2019	Best Production Design	Subrata Chakraborty and Amit Ray	Nominated	
Filmfare Awards	23 March 2019	Best Sound Design	Biswadeep Chatterjee	Nominated	
Filmfare Awards	23 March 2019	Best Costume Design	Ajay, Maxima Basu, Harpreet Rimple, Chandrakant Sonawane	Nominated	
Filmfare Awards	23 March 2019	Best Special Effects	NY VFXwaala	Nominated	
Filmfare Awards	23 March 2019	Best Action	Sham Kaushal	Nominated	
HELLO! Hall of Fame Awards	11 March 2018	Best Actor (Critics)	Shahid Kapoor	Won	
HELLO! Hall of Fame Awards	11 March 2018	Entertainer of the Year (Female)	Deepika Padukone	Won	
HELLO! Hall of Fame Awards	11 March 2018	Entertainer of the Year (Male)	Ranveer Singh	Won	
Indian Film Festival of Melbourne	10 August 2018	Best Film	Padmaavat	Nominated	
Indian Film Festival of Melbourne	10 August 2018	Best Director	Sanjay Leela Bhansali	Nominated	
Indian Film Festival of Melbourne	10 August 2018	Best Actress	Deepika Padukone	Nominated	
Indian Film Festival of Melbourne	10 August 2018	Best Actor	Ranveer Singh	Nominated	
Indian Film Festival of Melbourne	10 August 2018	Best Actor	Shahid Kapoor	Nominated	
International Indian Film Academy Awards	18 September 2019	Best Film	Padmaavat	Nominated	
International Indian Film Academy Awards	18 September 2019	Best Director	Sanjay Leela Bhansali	Nominated	
International Indian Film Academy Awards	18 September 2019	Best Actor	Ranveer Singh	Won	
International Indian Film Academy Awards	18 September 2019	Best Actress	Deepika Padukone	Nominated	
International Indian Film Academy Awards	18 September 2019	Best Supporting Actor	Jim Sarbh	Nominated	
International Indian Film Academy Awards	18 September 2019	Best Supporting Actress	Aditi Rao Hydari	Won	
International Indian Film Academy Awards	18 September 2019	Best Music Director	Sanjay Leela Bhansali	Nominated	
International Indian Film Academy Awards	18 September 2019	Best Female Playback Singer	Shreya Ghoshal – "Ghoomar"	Nominated	
Mirchi Music Awards	16 February 2019	Song of The Year	"Ghoomar"	Won	
Mirchi Music Awards	16 February 2019	Song of The Year	"Khalibali"	Nominated	
Mirchi Music Awards	16 February 2019	Album of The Year	Padmaavat	Won	
Mirchi Music Awards	16 February 2019	Male Vocalist of The Year	Shivam Pathak – "Ek Dil Ek Jaan"	Won	
Mirchi Music Awards	16 February 2019	Male Vocalist of The Year	Shail Hada and Shivam Pathak – "Khalibali"	Nominated	
Mirchi Music Awards	16 February 2019	Male Vocalist of The Year	Arijit Singh – "Binte Dil"	Nominated	
Mirchi Music Awards	16 February 2019	Female Vocalist of The Year	Shreya Ghoshal – "Ghoomar"	Won	
Mirchi Music Awards	16 February 2019	Female Vocalist of The Year	Neeti Mohan – "Nainowale Ne"	Nominated	
Mirchi Music Awards	16 February 2019	Music Composer of The Year	Sanjay Leela Bhansali – "Ek Dil Ek Jaan"	Won	
Mirchi Music Awards	16 February 2019	Music Composer of The Year	Sanjay Leela Bhansali – "Khalibali"	Nominated	
Mirchi Music Awards	16 February 2019	Music Composer of The Year	Sanjay Leela Bhansali – "Binte Dil"	Nominated	
Mirchi Music Awards	16 February 2019	Lyricist of The Year	A. M. Turaz – "Ek Dil Ek Jaan"	Nominated	
Mirchi Music Awards	16 February 2019	Raag-Inspired Song of the Year	"Ek Dil Ek Jaan"	Won	
Mirchi Music Awards	16 February 2019	Raag-Inspired Song of the Year	"Ghoomar"	Nominated	
Mirchi Music Awards	16 February 2019	Best Song Producer (Programming & Arranging)	Shail-Pritesh – "Khalibali"	Nominated	
Mirchi Music Awards	16 February 2019	Best Song Producer (Programming & Arranging)	Jackie Vanjari – "Binte Dil"	Nominated	
Mirchi Music Awards	16 February 2019	Best Song Engineer (Recording & Mixing)	Tanay Gajjar and Rahul Sharma – "Ghoomar"	Won	
Mirchi Music Awards	16 February 2019	Best Song Engineer (Recording & Mixing)	Tanay Gajjar – "Ek Dil Ek Jaan"	Nominated	
Mirchi Music Awards	16 February 2019	Best Song Engineer (Recording & Mixing)	Tanay Gajjar – "Binte Dil"	Nominated	
Mirchi Music Awards	16 February 2019	Best Background Score	Sanchit Balhara and Ankit Balhara	Won	
Mirchi Music Awards	16 February 2019	Listeners' Choice Album of the Year	Padmaavat	Nominated	
National Film Awards	9 August 2019	Best Music Direction	Sanjay Leela Bhansali	Won	
National Film Awards	9 August 2019	Best Male Playback Singer	Arijit Singh – "Binte Dil"	Won	
National Film Awards	9 August 2019	Best Choreography	Kruti Mahesh and Jyoti D Tommar – "Ghoomar"	Won	
Star Screen Awards	16 December 2018	Best Actor	Ranveer Singh	Won	
Star Screen Awards	16 December 2018	Best Female Playback Singer	Shreya Ghoshal	Won	
Star Screen Awards	16 December 2018	Best Choreography	Kruti Mahesh, Jyothi D Tommar	Won	
Star Screen Awards	16 December 2018	Best Actress	Deepika Padukone	Nominated	
Zee Cine Awards	19 March 2019	Best Film	Padmaavat	Nominated	
Zee Cine Awards	19 March 2019	Best Actor	Ranveer Singh	Won	
Zee Cine Awards	19 March 2019	Best Actress	Deepika Padukone	Won	
Zee Cine Awards	19 March 2019	Best Director	Sanjay Leela Bhansali	Won	
Zee Cine Awards	19 March 2019	Best Choreography	"Ghoomar"	Won	

== See also ==
- List of Bollywood films of 2018
