= 11th Mirchi Music Awards =

2019 Hindi language movie-music award ceremony

- Sponsored by: Pepsi
- Date: February 16, 2019
- Location: Dome@NSCI, Mumbai
- Country: India
- Presented by: Radio Mirchi
- Hosted by: Sonu Nigam

Highlights
- Most awards: Padmaavat (8)
- Most nominations: Padmaavat (21)
- Song of the Year: "Ghoomar" - Padmaavat
- Album of the Year: Padmaavat
- Website: Music Mirchi Awards 2018

Television/radio coverage
- Network: Zee TV

The 11th Mirchi Music Awards, presented by Indian FM radio station Radio Mirchi, honoured the best music professionals of Hindi language Indian films of 2018. The ceremony was held at the Dome at the National Sports Club of India, Mumbai on 16 February 2019 and was hosted by Indian singer and actor Sonu Nigam. The event included live music performances by Badshah, Neha Kakkar, Meet Bros, Jonita Gandhi, Arko, Papon, Shivam Pathak, and Ashmik Patil, the winner of the Smule Mirchi Cover Star. A new award category, "Recreated Song of the Year," was introduced to recognize the many ‘re-creations’ released in 2018. Padmaavat won several awards including Album of the Year and Song of the Year for "Ghoomar." The show was broadcast on 17 March 2019 on Zee TV.

== Winners and nominees ==
The winners were selected by the members of the jury, chaired by Kavita Krishnamurthy. The following table lists the names of nominees and winners.

(Winners are listed first, highlighted in boldface.)

=== Film awards ===
Song of the Year	Album of the Year
**"Ghoomar" - Padmaavat**; "Tareefan" - Veere Di Wedding; "Khalibali" - Padmaavat; "Dilbaro" - Raazi; "Bom Diggy Diggy" - Sonu Ke Titu Ki Sweety; "Ae Watan (Male)" - Raazi	**"Padmaavat" - Sanjay Leela Bhansali, A. M. Turaz, Siddharth-Garima, Swaroop Khan**; "Sonu Ke Titu Ki Sweety" - Amaal Mallik, Guru Randhawa, Rajat Nagpal, Rochak Kohli, Saurabh-Vaibhav, Yo Yo Honey Singh, Kumaar, Swapnil Tiwari; "Raazi" - Shankar–Ehsaan–Loy, Gulzar, Allama Iqbal; "Manmarziyaan" - Amit Trivedi, Shellee & Sikander Kahlon; "Kedarnath" - Amit Trivedi, Amitabh Bhattacharya
Male Vocalist of the Year	Female Vocalist of the Year
**Shivam Pathak - "EK Dil Ek Jaan" from Padmaavat**; Shail Hada & Shivam Pathak - "Khalibali" from Padmaavat; Ajay Gogavale - "Dhadak" from Dhadak; Arijit Singh - "Binte Dil" from Padmaavat; Arijit Singh - "Ae Watan (Male)" from Raazi	**Shreya Ghoshal - "Ghoomar" from Padmaavat**; Neeti Mohan - "Nainowale Ne" from Padmaavat; Harshdeep Kaur - "Dilbaro" from Raazi; Shreya Ghoshal - "Dhadak" from Dhadak; Sunidhi Chauhan - "Ae Watan (Female)" from Raazi
Music Composer of the Year	Lyricist of the Year
**Sanjay Leela Bhansali - "Ek Dil Ek Jaan" from Padmaavat**; Sanjay Leela Bhansali - "Khalibali" from Padmaavat; Ajay–Atul - "Dhadak" from Dhadak; Sanjay Leela Bhansali - "Binte Dil" from Padmaavat; Amit Trivedi - "Aaj Se Teri" from Pad Man	**Gulzar - "Ae Watan (Male)" from Raazi**; Kumaar - "Tera Yaar Hoon Main" from Sonu Ke Titu Ki Sweety; A. M. Turaz - "Ek Dil Ek Jaan" from Padmaavat; Gulzar - "Dilbaro" from Raazi; Irshad Kamil - "Aahista" from Laila Majnu
Upcoming Male Vocalist of the Year	Upcoming Female Vocalist of the Year
**Abhay Jodhpurkar - "Mere Naam Tu" from Zero**; Prateek Kuhad - "Saansein" from Karwaan; Prateek Kuhad - "Kadam" from Karwaan; Jazim Sharma - "Grey Walaa Shade" from Manmarziyaan; Jazim Sharma - "Chonch Ladhiyaan" from Manmarziyaan; Rahul Jain - "Aanewale Kal" from 1921	**Mahua Chokroborty - "Ab Maan Jao Sawaryia" from Angrezi Mein Kehte Hain**; Harjot Kaur - "Sajan Bade Senti" from Badhaai Ho; Dhvani Bhanushali - "Dilbar" from Satyameva Jayate; Deveshi Sahgal - "Daryaa (Unplugged)" from Manmarziyaan; Jasmin Walia - "Bom Diggy Diggy" from Sonu Ke Titu Ki Sweety
Upcoming Music Composer of The Year	Upcoming Lyricist of The Year
**Niladri Kumar - "Aahista" from Laila Majnu**; Qaran - "Tareefan" from Veere Di Wedding; Prateek Kuhad - "Saansein" from Karwaan; Prateek Kuhad - "Kadam" from Karwaan	**Prateek Kuhad - "Kadam" from Karwaan**; Prateek Kuhad - "Saansein" from Karwaan; Abhijat Joshi and Rohan Gokhale - "Baba Bolta Hain Bas Ho Gaya" from Sanju; Jamil Ahmed - "Adhura Lafz" from Baazaar
Raag-Inspired Song of the Year	Recreated Song of the Year
**"Ek Dil Ek Jaan" - Padmaavat**; "Ishq Di Baajiyaan" - Soorma; "Ghoomar" - Padmaavat; "Bol Ke Lab Azaad Hain" - Manto; "Ari Maee Re" - Dassehra	**"Sanu Ek Pal" - Raid**; "Tere Bin" - Simmba; "Dilbar" - Satyameva Jayate; "Chogada" - Loveyatri; "Aankh Marey" - Simmba

=== Technical awards ===
Best Song Producer (Programming & Arranging)	Best Song Engineer (Recording & Mixing)
**Ajay–Atul - "Dhadak" from Dhadak**; Shail-Pritesh - "Khalibali" from Padmaavat; Jackie Vanjari - "Binte Dil" from Padmaavat; Tanishk Bagchi and Azeem Dayani - "Akh Lad Jaave" from Loveyatri; Tanishk Bagchi and Azeem Dayani - "Aankh Marey" from Simmba	**Tanay Gajjar and Rahul Sharma - "Ghoomar" from Padmaavat**; Badshah and Aditya Dev - "Heartless" from O.N.E. (Album); Tanay Gajjar - "Ek Dil Ek Jaan" from Padmaavat; Tanay Gajjar - "Binte Dil" from Padmaavat; Eric Pillai and Michael Edwin Pillai - "Aankh Marey" from Simmba
Best Background Score
**Sanchit Balhara and Ankit Balhara - Padmaavat**; Shankar–Ehsaan–Loy and Tubby - Raazi; Zakir Hussain - Manto; John Stewart Eduri - Dhadak; Daniel B. George - Andhadhun

=== Listeners' Choice awards ===
Listeners' Choice Song of the Year	Listeners' Choice Album of the Year
**"Dil Chori" - Sonu Ke Titu Ki Sweety**; "Zingaat" - Dhadak; "Tareefan" - Veere Di Wedding; "Dilbar" - Satyameva Jayate; "O Saathi" - Baaghi 2	**"Sonu Ke Titu Ki Sweety" - Amaal Mallik, Guru Randhawa, Rajat Nagpal, Rochak Kohli, Saurabh-Vaibhav, Yo Yo Honey Singh, Kumaar, Swapnil Tiwari**; "Raazi" - Shankar–Ehsaan–Loy, Gulzar, Allama Iqbal; "Padmaavat" - Sanjay Leela Bhansali, A. M. Turaz, Siddharth-Garima, Swaroop Khan; "Manmarziyaan" - Amit Trivedi, Shellee & Sikander Kahlon; "Kedarnath" - Amit Trivedi, Amitabh Bhattacharya

=== Non-film awards ===
Indie Pop Song of the Year
- **"Maula (One Above)" sung by Reewa Rathod**
  - "Tera Ghata" sung by Gajendra Verma
  - "Kuch Tum Bhi" sung by Vaishali Mhade
  - "Ghane Badra" sung by Sona Mohapatra
  - "Aye Zindagi" sung by Suresh Wadkar

=== Special awards ===
Lifetime Achievement Award	Usha Khanna
Royal Stag Make It Large Award	Ranveer Singh
Bollywood Face of Iconic Hits	Anil Kapoor
Pepsi Swag Star Award	Badshah

=== Jury awards ===
Outstanding Contribution to Hindi Film Music	Rajendra Singh Sodha
Best Album of Golden Era (1958)	Madhumati

=== Films with multiple wins and nominations ===
Films that received multiple nominations
Nominations	Film
21	Padmaavat
10	Raazi
6	Dhadak
6	Karwaan
6	Sonu Ke Titu Ki Sweety
5	Manmarziyaan
4	Simmba
3	Veere Di Wedding
3	Satyameva Jayate
2	Kedarnath
2	Laila Majnu
2	Loveyatri
2	Manto

Films that received multiple awards
Wins	Film
8	Padmaavat
2	Sonu Ke Titu Ki Sweety

== Jury ==
The jury was chaired by Kavita Krishnamurthy and included the following:

- Milind Srivastava - music director
- Anuradha Paudwal - playback singer
- Dharmesh Darshan - director and writer
- Hariharan - singer
- Ila Arun - actress and folk singer
- Irshad Kamil - lyricist
- Lalit Pandit - composer
- Louis Banks - composer, record producer and singer
- Pankaj Udhas - singer
- Pritam - music director and composer
- Rajkumar Santoshi - director, producer and screenwriter
- Ramesh Sippy - director and producer
- Roop Kumar Rathod - playback singer and music director
- Sadhana Sargam - playback singer
- Sameer - lyricist
- Sapna Mukherjee - playback singer
- Shailendra Singh - playback singer
- Shankar Mahadevan - composer and playback singer
- Shravan Rathod - music director
- Sudesh Bhosle - playback singer
- Suresh Wadkar - playback singer
- Talat Aziz - singer
- Udit Narayan - playback singer
- Vijay Krishna Acharya - director and screenwriter

== See also ==
- Mirchi Music Awards
