= Zee Cine Award for Best Lyricist =

Music award

The Zee Cine Award Best Lyricist is chosen by the jury and the winner is announced at the actual ceremony.

The award is given in the current year, but the winner is awarded for his/her work in the previous year.

== Superlatives ==
=== Multiple wins ===
Wins	Recipient
4	Javed Akhtar
3	Gulzar, Irshad Kamil
2	Prasoon Joshi, Amitabh Bhattacharya

=== Multiple nominations ===
Wins	Recipient
5	Anand Bakshi
4	Javed Akhtar, Gulzar
2	Prasoon Joshi, Sameer, Manoj Muntashir

== Winners and nominees ==
- Winners are highlighted first in gold, followed by the other nominees.

† – Indicates the performance also won the Filmfare Award for Best Music Director

‡ – Indicates the performance was also nominated for the Filmfare Award for Best Music Director

=== 1990s ===
Year	Photos of winners	Lyricist	Song	Film	Ref.
1998 (1st)		Javed Akhtar †	"Sandese Aate Hai"	Border	
1998 (1st)		Anand Bakshi ‡	"Bholi Si Surat"	Dil To Pagal Hai	
1998 (1st)		Anand Bakshi	"Dil To Pagal Hai"	Dil To Pagal Hai	
1998 (1st)		Anand Bakshi ‡	"I Love My India"	Pardes	
1998 (1st)		Sameer	"Sona Kitna Sona Hai"	Hero No. 1	
1999 (2nd)		Sameer ‡	"Kuch Kuch Hota Hai"	Kuch Kuch Hota Hai	

=== 2000s ===
Year	Photos of winners	Lyricist	Song	Film	Ref.
2000 (3rd)		Anand Bakshi †	"Ishq Bina"	Taal	
2000 (3rd)		Anand Bakshi ‡	"Taal Se Taal"	Taal	
2000 (3rd)		Dev Kohli	"Biwi No.1"	Biwi No.1	
2000 (3rd)		Israr Ansari ‡	"Zindagi Maut Na Ban Jaye"	Sarfarosh	
2000 (3rd)		Mehboob	"Chand Chupa Badal Mein"	Hum Dil De Chuke Sanam	
2001 (4th)		Javed Akhtar †	"Panchhi Nadiya"	Refugee	
2002 (5th)		Javed Akhtar ‡	"Radha Kaise Na Jale"	Lagaan	
2003 (6th)		Gulzar †	"Saathiya"	Saathiya	
2004 (7th)		Amrita Pritam	"Charka Chalati Hai"	Pinjar	
2005 (8th)		Javed Akhtar	"Yeh Jo Des Hai Tera"	Swades	
2006 (9th)		Gulzar †	"Kajra Re"	Bunty Aur Babli	
2007 (10th)		Prasoon Joshi	"Masti Ki Paathshaala"	Rang De Basanti	
2007 (10th)		Gulzar ‡	"Beedi Jalaile"	Omkara	
2007 (10th)		Javed Akhtar ‡	"Mitwa"	Kabhi Alvida Naa Kehna	
2007 (10th)		Mir Ali Hussain	"Yeh Honsla"	Dor	
2007 (10th)		Swanand Kirkire	"Bande Mein Tha Dum"	Lage Raho Munna Bhai	
2008 (11th)		Prasoon Joshi †	"Maa"	Taare Zameen Par	
2008 (11th)		Gulzar ‡	"Tere Bina"	Guru	
2008 (11th)		Javed Akhtar ‡	"Main Agar Kahoon"	Om Shanti Om	
2008 (11th)		Sameer Anjaan ‡	"Jab Se Tere Naina"	Saawariya	
2008 (11th)		Sayeed Quadri	"In Dino"	Life in a... Metro	
2009 (12th)	Not Awarded				

=== 2010s ===
Year	Photos of winners	Lyricist	Song	Film	Ref.
2010 (13th)	Not Awarded				
2011 (14th)	Not Awarded				
2012 (15th)		Irshad Kamil †	"Jo Bhi Main"	Rockstar	
2013 (16th)	Not Awarded				
2014 (17th)		Mithoon †	"Tum Hi Ho"	Aashiqui 2	
2015 (18th)	Not Awarded				
2016 (18th)		Varun Grover †	"Moh Moh Ke Dhaage"	Dum Laga Ke Haisha	
2017 (19th)		Irshad Kamil †	"Jag Ghoomeya"	Sultan	
2018 (20th)		Amitabh Bhattacharya †	"Zaalima"	Raees	
2019 (21st)		Gulzar ‡	"Dilbaro"	Raazi	
2019 (21st)		A. M. Turaz	"Ek Dil Ek Jaan"	Padmaavat	
2019 (21st)		Amitabh Bhattacharya	"Dhadak"	Dhadak	
2019 (21st)		Gulzar †	"Ae Watan"	Raazi	
2019 (21st)		Irshad Kamil ‡	"Mere Naam Tu"	Zero	
2019 (21st)		Javed Akhtar	"Main Zinda Hoon"	Paltan	

=== 2020s ===
Year	Photos of winners	Lyricist	Song	Film	Ref.
2020 (22nd)		Manoj Muntashir ‡	"Teri Mitti"	Kesari	
2020 (22nd)		Divine & Ankur Tewari †	"Apna Time Aayega"	Gully Boy	
2020 (22nd)		Kumaar	"Ghungroo"	War	
2020 (22nd)		Manoj Muntashir ‡	"Ve Maahi"	Kesari	
2020 (22nd)		Mithoon ‡	"Tujhe Kitna Chahne Lage"	Kabir Singh	
2021	Not Awarded				
2022	Not Awarded				
2023 (23rd)		Amitabh Bhattacharya †	"Kesariya"	Brahmāstra: Part One – Shiva	
2024 (24th)		Kumaar †	"Chaleya"	Jawan	
2025 (25th)		Irshad Kamil †	"Mainu Vida Karo"	Amar Singh Chamkila	

== See also ==
- Zee Cine Awards
- Bollywood
- Cinema of India
