= Padmavati =

Padmāvatī may refer to:

== Deities ==
- Padmavati (Jainism), a Jain attendant goddess (Yakshini)
- Lakshmi, the Hindu goddess of fortune
- Padmavati (Hinduism), or Alamelu Manga, a Hindu goddess and consort of Venkateshvara, a form of Vishnu
- Manasa, a Hindu serpent goddess
- Padmavati, consort of Ugrasena and mother of Kamsa
- Padmavati, a regional wife of Karna

== Arts and media ==
- Padmavat, a 1540 epic ballad written in the Awadhi dialect of Hindi
- Padmavati (poem), a 1648 epic ballad written in the Bengali language
- Padmaavat, formerly titled Padmavati, a 2018 Indian film
  - Padmaavat (soundtrack)
- Padmâvatî (opera), by French composer Albert Roussel
- Padmāvatī, in Bhasa's Svapnavasavadattam

== People ==
- Padmavati (wife of Ashoka), (North Indian tradition), Ashoka's third wife and Kunala's mother
- Rani Padmini, also known as Padmavati, a legendary queen of Chittor and wife of the ruler Ratan Singh, celebrated in the Padmavat
- S. I. Padmavati (born 1917), Indian cardiologist and recipient of the Padma Vibhushan

== Other uses ==
- Padmavati Pawaya, an ancient city mentioned in Sanskrit classics and inscriptions
- Sri Padmavati Mahila Visvavidyalayam, a university in Tirupati named after the Hindu goddess

== See also ==
- Nagas of Padmavati, a dynasty which ruled in ancient Padmavati
