= 64th Filmfare Awards =

2019 awards for Hindi cinema

- 64th Filmfare Awards
- Date: 23 March 2019
- Site: Jio Garden, BKC, Mumbai
- Hosted by: Shah Rukh Khan; Rajkummar Rao; Vicky Kaushal; Ayushmann Khurrana; Salman Khan
- Official website: Filmfare Awards 2019

Highlights
- Best Film: Raazi
- Critics Award for Best Film: Andhadhun
- Most awards: Andhadhun & Raazi (5)
- Most nominations: Padmaavat (18)

Television coverage
- Network: Colors TV

The 64th Filmfare Awards ceremony, presented by The Times Group, honored the best Indian Hindi-language films of 2018. The ceremony was held on 23 March 2019 in Mumbai.

Padmaavat led the ceremony with 18 nominations, followed by Raazi with 15 nominations, Andhadhun with 11 nominations, and Badhaai Ho and Stree with 10 nominations each.

Andhadhun and Raazi won 5 awards each, thus becoming the most-awarded films at the ceremony, with the former winning Best Film (Critics) and Best Actor (Critics) (for Ayushmann Khurrana), and the latter winning Best Film, Best Director (for Meghna Gulzar), and Best Actress (for Alia Bhatt).

Badhaai Ho and Padmaavat won 4 awards each; Tumbbad and Sanju won 3 and 2 awards respectively, with the latter winning Best Actor (for Ranbir Kapoor).

For the first time in the history of the Filmfare Awards, there was a tie for Best Supporting Actor – when Gajraj Rao for Badhaai Ho tied with Vicky Kaushal for Sanju for the award.

== Winners and nominees ==
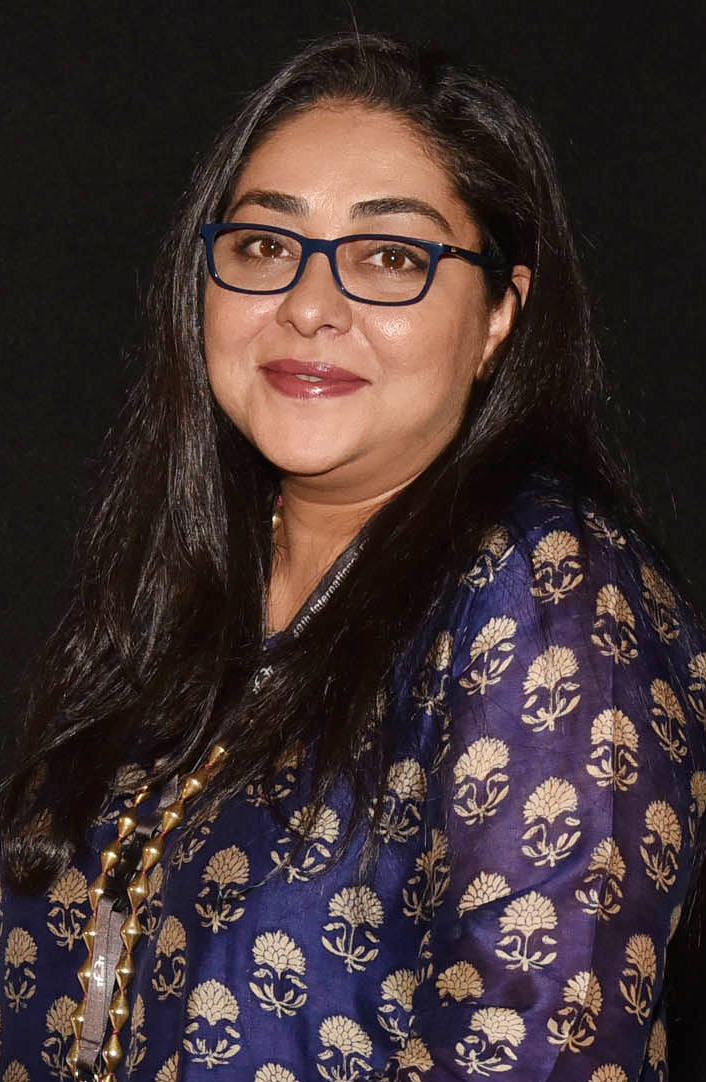
Meghna Gulzar, Best Director

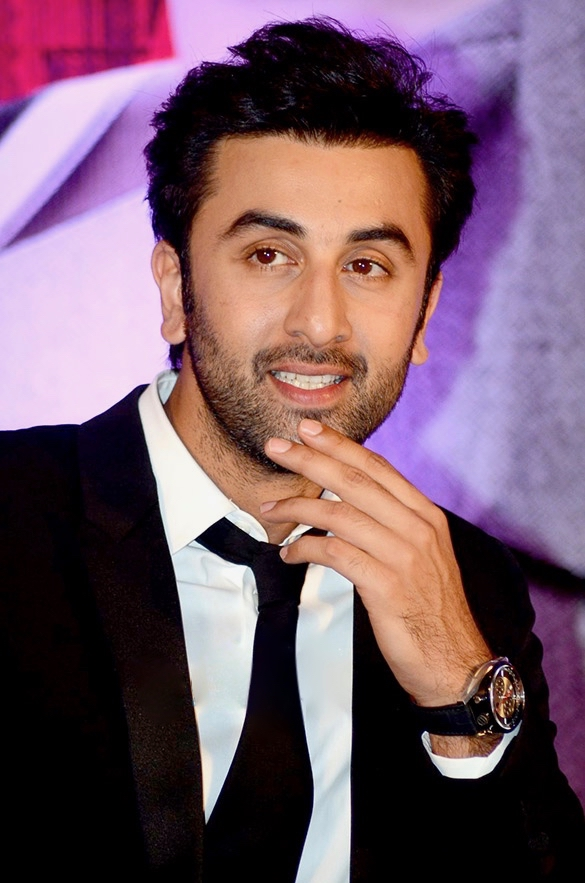
Ranbir Kapoor, Best Actor

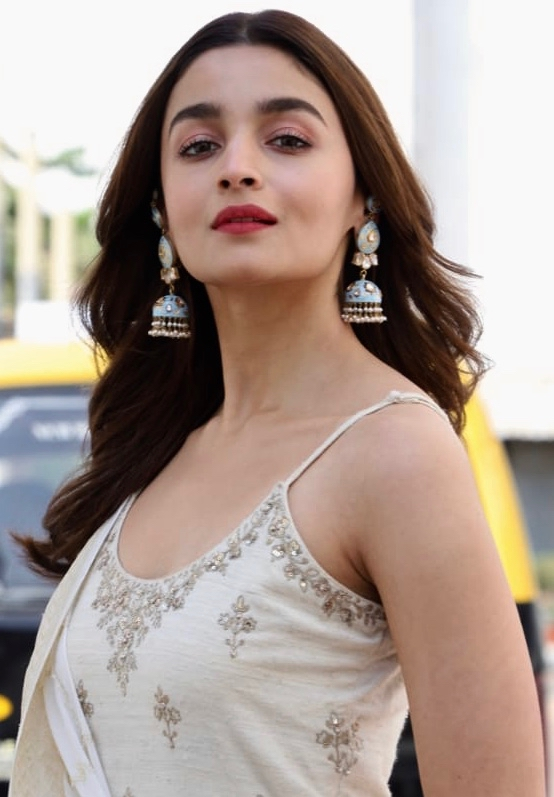
Alia Bhatt, Best Actress

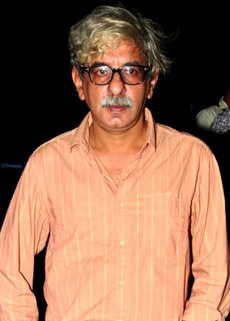
Sriram Raghavan, Best Director Critics

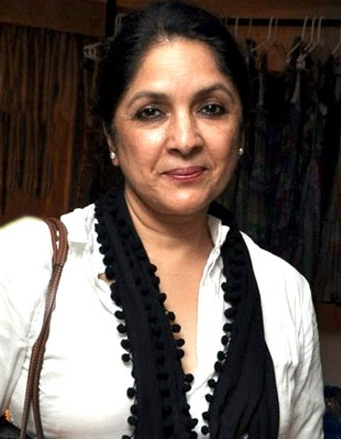
Neena Gupta, Best Actress Critics

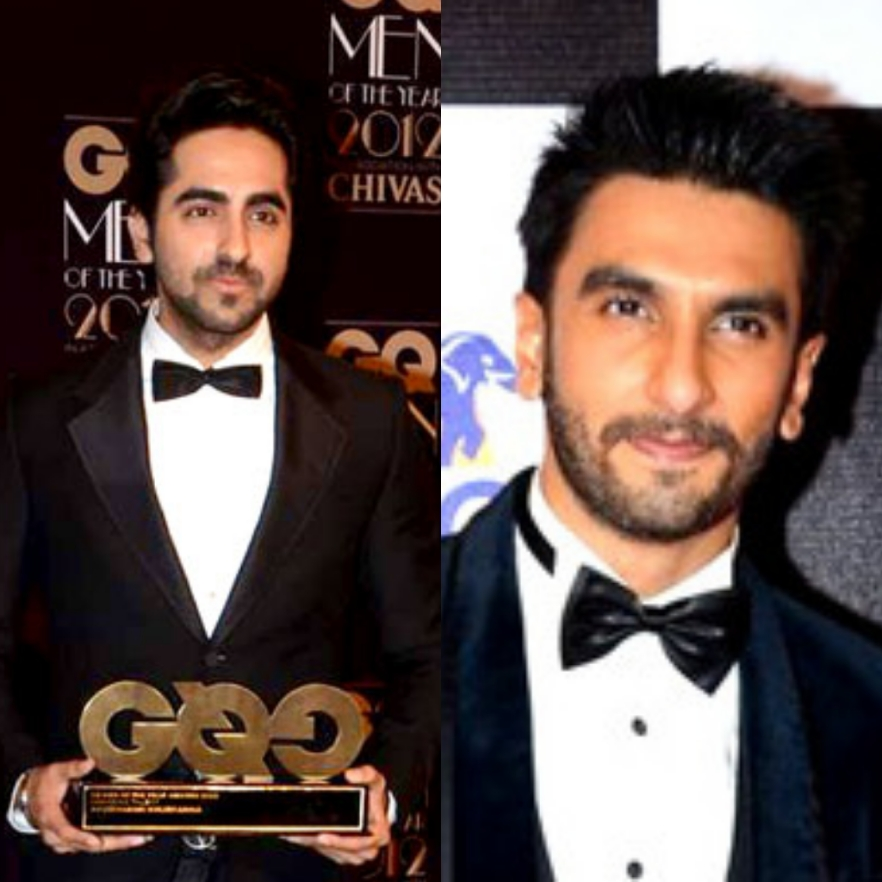
Ayushmann Khurrana & Ranveer Singh, Best Actor Critics

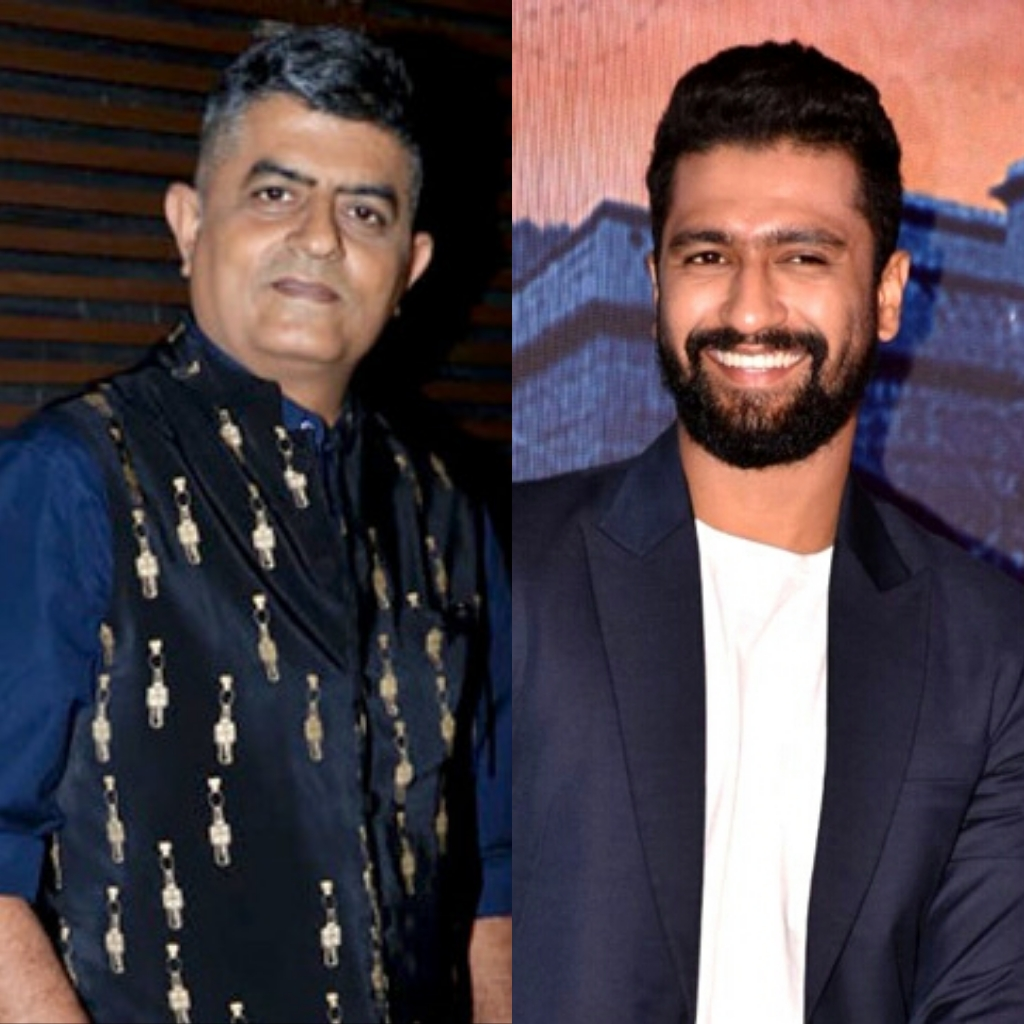
Gajraj Rao & Vicky Kaushal, Best Supporting Actor

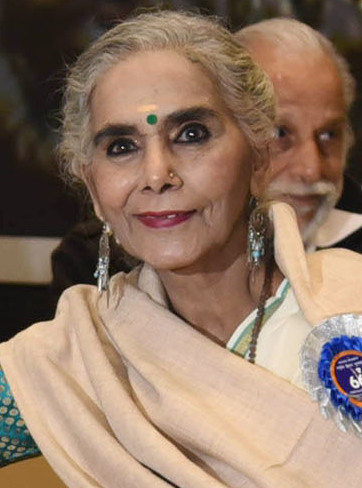
Surekha Sikri, Best Supporting Actress

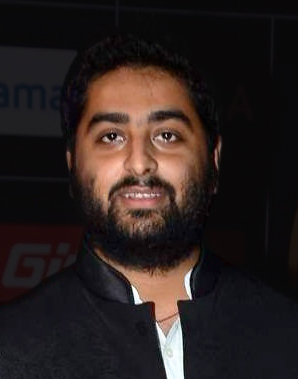
Arijit Singh, Best Male Playback Singer

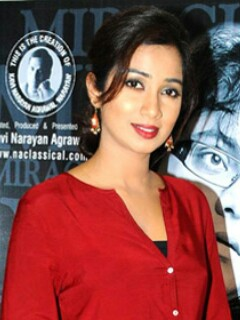
Shreya Ghosal, Best Female Playback Singer

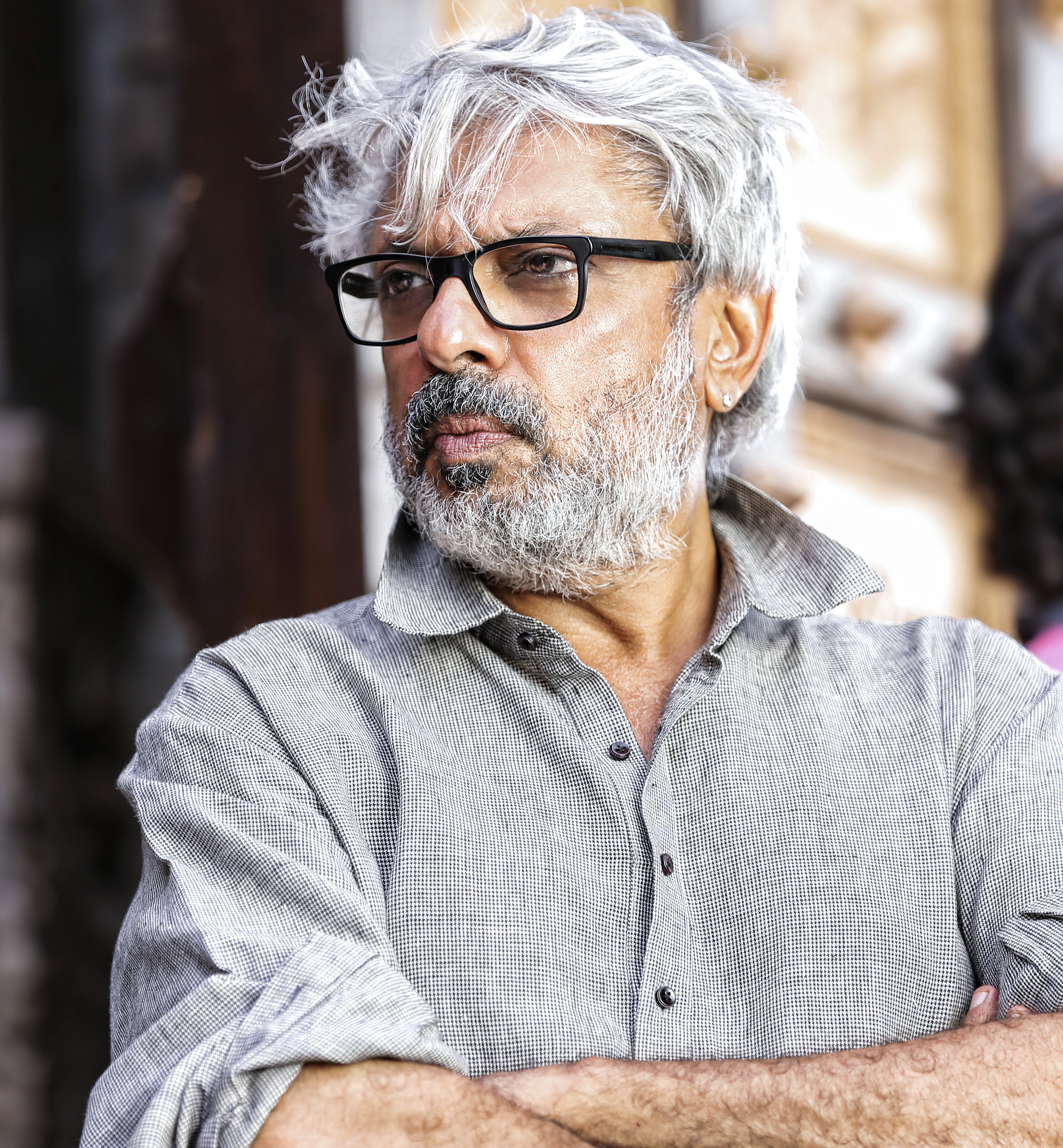
Sanjay Leela Bhansali, Best Music Director

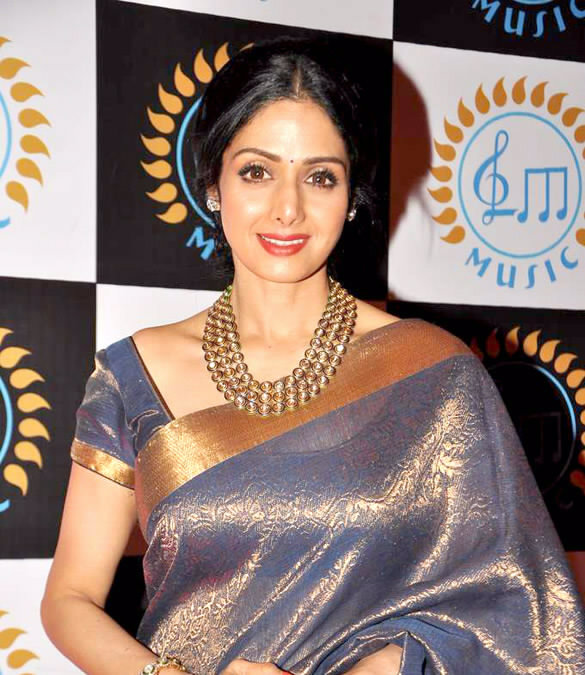
Sridevi, Lifetime Achievement Awardee

Public voting for nominations on the Filmfare website opened at the end of December 2018 and closed at the end of January 2019. Nominees were announced on 12 March 2019 and the winners were announced on 23 March 2019.

=== Popular awards ===
Best Film	Best Director
Raazi – Dharma Productions, Junglee Pictures – Karan Johar, Vineet Jain, Hiroo Yash Johar, Apoorva Mehta; Andhadhun – Viacom18 Motion Pictures, Matchbox Pictures; Badhaai Ho – Junglee Pictures, Chrome Pictures – Vineet Jain, Aleya Sen, Hemant Bhandari, Amit Ravindernath Sharma, Sushil Choudhary, Priti Sahani; Padmaavat – Viacom18 Motion Pictures, Bhansali Productions – Sudhanshu Vats, Ajit Andhare, Sanjay Leela Bhansali; Sanju – Vinod Chopra Films, Rajkumar Hirani Films, Fox Star Studios – Vidhu Vinod Chopra, Rajkumar Hirani; Stree – Maddock Films, D2R Films, Jio Studios – Dinesh Vijan, Raj and DK	Meghna Gulzar – Raazi; Amar Kaushik – Stree; Amit Sharma – Badhaai Ho; Rajkumar Hirani – Sanju; Sanjay Leela Bhansali – Padmaavat; Sriram Raghavan – Andhadhun
Best Actor	Best Actress
Ranbir Kapoor – Sanju as Sanjay Dutt; Akshay Kumar – Pad Man as Laxmikant Chauhan; Ayushmann Khurrana – Andhadhun as Akash; Rajkummar Rao – Stree as Vicky; Ranveer Singh – Padmaavat as Alauddin Khilji; Shah Rukh Khan – Zero as Bauua Singh	Alia Bhatt – Raazi as Sehmat Khan; Deepika Padukone – Padmaavat as Rani Padmavati; Neena Gupta – Badhaai Ho as Priyamvada Kaushik; Rani Mukerji – Hichki as Ms. Naina Mathur; Tabu – Andhadhun as Simi
Best Supporting Actor	Best Supporting Actress
Gajraj Rao – Badhaai Ho as Jeetendra Kaushik; Vicky Kaushal – Sanju as Kamlesh "Kamli" Kanhaiyalal Kapasi (tie); Aparshakti Khurana – Stree as Bittu; Jim Sarbh – Padmaavat as Malik Kafur; Manoj Pahwa – Mulk as Bilal Ali Mohammed; Pankaj Tripathi – Stree as Rudra	Surekha Sikri – Badhaai Ho as Dadi; Gitanjali Rao – October as Prof. Vidya Iyer; Katrina Kaif – Zero as Babita Kumari; Shikha Talsania – Veere Di Wedding as Meera Kaur Stinson; Swara Bhaskar – Veere Di Wedding as Sakshi Soni; Yamini Dass – Sui Dhaaga as Nimmo Sharma
Best Male Debut	Best Female Debut
Ishaan Khatter – Beyond the Clouds as Amir and Dhadak as Madhukar Bagla	Sara Ali Khan – Kedarnath as Mandakani "Mukku" Mishra; Banita Sandhu – October as Shiuli Iyer; Janhvi Kapoor – Dhadak as Parthavi Singh Rathore; Mouni Roy – Gold as Monobina; Radhika Madan – Pataakha as Chamki Kumari
Best Music Director	Best Lyricist
Sanjay Leela Bhansali – Padmaavat; Ajay–Atul – Dhadak; Ajay–Atul – Zero; Amaal Mallik, Rochak Kohli, Yo Yo Honey Singh, Guru Randhawa, Zack Knight, Saurabh-Vaibhav and Rajat Nagpal – Sonu Ke Titu Ki Sweety; Amit Trivedi – Manmarziyaan; Shankar–Ehsaan–Loy – Raazi	Gulzar – "Ae Watan" – Raazi; A. M. Turaz – "Binte Dil" – Padmaavat; Gulzar – "Dilbaro" – Raazi; Irshad Kamil – "Mere Naam Tu" – Zero; Kumaar – "Tera Yaar Hoon Main" – Sonu Ke Titu Ki Sweety; Shekhar Astitva – "Kar Har Maidaan Fateh" – Sanju
Best Playback Singer – Male	Best Playback Singer – Female
Arijit Singh – "Ae Watan (Male)" – Raazi; Abhay Jodhpurkar – "Mere Naam Tu" – Zero; Arijit Singh – "Binte Dil" – Padmaavat; Arijit Singh – "Tera Yaar Hoon Main" – Sonu Ke Titu Ki Sweety; Badshah – "Tareefan" – Veere Di Wedding; Shankar Mahadevan – "Dilbaro" – Raazi	Shreya Ghoshal – "Ghoomar" – Padmaavat; Harshdeep Kaur and Vibha Saraf – "Dilbaro" – Raazi; Jonita Gandhi – "Ahista" – Laila Majnu; Ronkini Gupta – "Chaav Laga" – Sui Dhaaga; Sunidhi Chauhan – "Manwaa" – October; Sunidhi Chauhan – "Ae Watan (Female)" – Raazi

=== Critics' awards ===
Nominations for the critics award was announced on 12 March 2019.

Best Film (Best Director)
Andhadhun – Sriram Raghavan; Badhaai Ho – Amit Sharma; Manto – Nandita Das; Pataakha – Vishal Bhardwaj; Raazi – Meghna Gulzar; Tumbbad – Rahi Anil Barve
Best Actor	Best Actress
Ayushmann Khurrana – Andhadhun as Akash; Ranveer Singh – Padmaavat as Alauddin Khilji (tie); Nawazuddin Siddiqui – Manto as Saadat Hasan Manto; Ranbir Kapoor – Sanju as Sanjay Dutt; Varun Dhawan – October as Danish Walia; Vineet Kumar Singh – Mukkabaaz as Sharavan Kumar Singh	Neena Gupta – Badhaai Ho as Priyamvada Kaushik; Alia Bhatt – Raazi as Sehmat Khan; Anushka Sharma – Sui Dhaaga as Mamta; Radhika Madan – Pataakha as Champa 'Badki' Kumari; Taapsee Pannu – Mulk as Aarti Mohammad; Tabu – Andhadhun as Simi
Best Short Film (Non-Fiction)	Best Short Film (Fiction)
Sachin Balasaheb Suryavanshi – The Soccer City	Rogan Josh
Best Short Film (People's Choice)
Plus Minus; First Period; Gandh; Kahanibaaz; Malota; Prawns; Rogan Josh; Udne Do
Best Actor – Male (Short Film)	Best Actor – Female (Short Film)
Hussain Dalal – Shameless	Kirti Kulhari – Maya

=== Special awards ===
Lifetime Achievement Award
- Sridevi (awarded posthumously)
50 Years of Outstanding Contribution to Cinema
- Hema Malini
RD Burman Award
- Niladri Kumar for Laila Majnu
Best Debut Director
- Amar Kaushik – Stree

=== Technical awards ===
The winners were announced on 23 March 2019.

Best Story	Best Screenplay
Anubhav Sinha – Mulk; Anudeep Singh – Mukkabaaz; Raj and DK – Stree; Sharat Katariya – Sui Dhaaga; ~~Akshat Ghildial, Shantanu Srivastava – Badhaai Ho~~ (Withdrawn)	Sriram Raghavan, Arijit Biswas, Pooja Ladha Surti, Yogesh Chandekar, Hemanth Rao – Andhadhun; Anubhav Sinha – Mulk; Bhavani Iyer and Meghna Gulzar – Raazi; Nandita Das – Manto; Raj and DK – Stree
Best Dialogue	Best Editing
Akshat Ghildial – Badhaai Ho; Anubhav Sinha – Mulk; Nandita Das – Manto; Sharat Katariya – Sui Dhaaga; Sumit Aroraa – Stree; Vishal Bhardwaj – Pataakha	Pooja Ladha Surti – Andhadhun; Ballu Saluja – Mulk; Hemanti Sarkar – Stree; Nitin Baid – Raazi; Sanyukta Kaza – Tumbbad
Best Choreography	Best Cinematography
Kruti Mahesh and Jyothi D Tomar – "Ghoomar" – Padmaavat; Ganesh Acharya – "Khalibali" – Padmaavat; Ganesh Acharya – "Main Badhiya Tu Bhi Badhiya" – Sanju; Remo D'Souza – "Mere Naam Tu" – Zero; Shabina Khan – "Balma" – Pataakha	Pankaj Kumar – Tumbbad; Avik Mukhopadhyay – October; Kartik Vijay – Manto; Ranjan Palit – Pataakha; Siddharth Diwan – Bhavesh Joshi Superhero; Sudeep Chatterjee – Padmaavat
Best Production Design	Best Sound Design
Nitin Zihani Choudhary and Rakesh Yadav – Tumbbad; Madhusudan – Stree; Neil Chowdhury – Omertà; Ratheesh UK – Badhaai Ho; Rita Ghosh – Manto; Subrata Chakraborty and Amit Ray – Padmaavat	Kunal Sharma – Tumbbad; Anish John – Pari; Biswdeep Chatterjee – Padmaavat; Dipankar Jojo Chaki – October; Madhu Apsara – Andhadhun; Robert Kellough – Gali Guleiyan
Best Costume Design	Best Background Score
Sheetal Sharma – Manto; Ajay, Maxima Basu, Harpreet Rimple and Chandrakant Sonawane – Padmaavat; Karishma Sharma – Pataakha; Payal Saluja – Gold; Smriti Chauhan and Sachin Lovalekar – Tumbbad	Daniel B. George – Andhadhun; Amit Trivedi – Manmarziyaan; Jesper Kyd – Tumbbad; Shankar–Ehsaan–Loy and Tubby – Raazi; Shantanu Moitra – October
Best Special Effects	Best Action
Red Chillies VFX – Zero; Filmgate Films AB – Tumbbad; NYVFXWala – Padmaavat; Red Chillies VFX – Pari	Vikram Dahiya and Sunil Rodrigues – Mukkabaaz; Ahmed Khan, Kecha Khampadkee, Ram Chella, Lakshman Chella and Shamshir Khan – Baaghi 2; Cyril Raffaelli, Sebastian Seveau and Vikram Dahiya – Bhavesh Joshi Superhero; Sham Kaushal – Padmaavat; Sunil Rodrigues – Simmba

== Superlatives ==
=== Multiple nominations ===
Nominations	Film
18	Padmaavat
15	Raazi
11	Andhadhun
10	Badhaai Ho
10	Stree
8	Tumbbad
7	Manto
7	Sanju
7	Zero
6	Mulk
6	October
6	Pataakha
5	Sui Dhaaga
3	Mukkabaaz
3	Sonu Ke Titu Ki Sweety
3	Veere Di Wedding
2	Bhavesh Joshi Superhero
2	Manmarziyaan
2	Pari

=== Multiple wins ===
Awards	Film
5	Andhadhun
5	Raazi
4	Badhaai Ho
4	Padmaavat
3	Tumbbad
2	Sanju
1	Beyond the Clouds; Kedarnath

== See also ==
- Filmfare Awards
- List of Bollywood films of 2018
