= Zero (2018 film) =

2018 film directed by Aanand L. Rai

- Theatrical release poster
- Directed by: Aanand L. Rai
- Written by: Himanshu Sharma
- Produced by: Gauri Khan; Aanand L. Rai
- Starring: Shah Rukh Khan; Katrina Kaif; Anushka Sharma
- Cinematography: Manu Anand
- Edited by: Hemal Kothari
- Music by: Ajay-Atul
- Production companies: Red Chillies Entertainment; Colour Yellow Productions
- Distributed by: Pen Marudhar Entertainment and PVR Pictures (India); Yash Raj Films (International) (Note: Red Chillies Entertainment sold the domestic distribution rights for Zero to individuals, rather than a single production house. Yash Raj Films (YRF) handled international distribution on a commissioned basis.)
- Release date: 21 December 2018 (India)
- Running time: 164 minutes
- Country: India
- Language: Hindi
- Budget: ₹200 crore
- Box office: ₹191.43 crore

Zero is a 2018 Indian Hindi-language romantic comedy drama film written by Himanshu Sharma, directed by Aanand L. Rai and produced by Colour Yellow Productions in collaboration with Red Chillies Entertainment. The film stars Shah Rukh Khan, Katrina Kaif, Anushka Sharma, with Abhay Deol, R. Madhavan, and Mohammed Zeeshan Ayyub in supporting roles. The plot revolves around Bauua Singh, a short man from Meerut who, after having difficulty finding a marriage partner, finds a companion in Aafia Bhinder, a NSAR (a fictional space research facility) scientist with cerebral palsy. However, film superstar Babita also gets close with him, testing his first relationship, before this love triangle takes them to far-off cities, thrusting Bauua into an adventure to discover both his true love and completeness in a life lived to the fullest.

The project was conceived by Rai in 2012, before pre-production commenced in 2016. Initially under the working title Katrina Meri Jaan, it went through numerous name changes before arriving at the final title in early 2018. Principal photography began in Mumbai during May 2017 and concluded in 2018 in Orlando. The soundtrack is composed by Ajay–Atul with lyrics written by Irshad Kamil, under the label T-Series.

Zero was released on 21 December 2018, to mixed-to-negative reviews from both critics and audiences alike. The lead performances (especially Khan and Kaif) and visual effects received acclaim. However, the direction, story, plot, and inconsistent screenplay were largely criticised. Despite having widespread hype prior to release, the film was one of the biggest box-office failures in Khan's career leading him to take a five-year hiatus.

At the 64th Filmfare Awards, Zero received seven nominations, including Best Actor (Khan) and Best Supporting Actress (Kaif), and won Best Special Effects.

== Plot ==
Bauua Singh, a young man from Meerut with short stature, has trouble finding a marriage partner. After using matrimonial agencies with little luck, he eventually finds his companion in Aafia Yusufzai Bhinder, a NSAR scientist (a fictionalised depiction of NASA) with cerebral palsy. In the events that followed, both fall in love with each other, but Bauua dumps her after five months. However, Aafia comes looking for him, and Bauua's parents fix their marriage. On their marriage day, Bauua's friend Guddu tells him that he is shortlisted for a dance competition he had applied for earlier, where the winner gets a chance to meet Babita Kumari, a Bollywood actress. Baua, determined to meet Babita, runs away from the marriage after a confrontation with Aafia, leaving everyone devastated.

Bauua wins and gets to meet Babita at a party, accompanied by other famous Bollywood actors. Babita offers him a job after he displays an ability to guess what goes on in people's mind by observing them. He accompanies her on film schedules and award functions, helping her patch up with her ex-boyfriend Aditya Kapoor, who had previously cheated on her. Bauua tells Babita about Aafia, who in turn falsely tells him that her parents were dwarfs and her father cheated on her mother, to make Bauua realise his mistake. He realises his wrongdoings and wishing to reconcile with Aafia, starts an argument at a party organised by Babita, following which Babita throws him out and breaks all ties with Aditya, realising the latter is cheating on her again.

Bauua and Guddu travel to New York, where Aafia is attending a seminar. Bauaa crashes the seminar to meet her, but Aafia refuses to see him. Aafia's father tells him that Aafia was pregnant with Bauua's child, due to which she wanted him to marry her in the first place. A heartbroken Bauua decides to leave the city, but decides to try his luck one more time. After meeting with Aafia again at NSAR and getting rejected by her, Bauua enlists in a program recruiting human volunteers to be sent to Mars on a rocket. After painstaking training and getting help from one of the applicants, Bauaa gets selected, while Guddu is rejected for his vision disability. On the day of his launch, Aafia, who is supposed to marry Srinivasan, a fellow scientist and Aafia's colleague, leaves him, and she reaches NSAR seconds before Bauua's launch. Bauua assures her that he always loved her, just before the rocket takes off. The launch is witnessed by Aafia, Guddu and Srinivasan, along with Babita and Bauua's family via television broadcast. The launch is successful, and the rocket thrusts off in space.

In a voice-over by Aafia, it is revealed that Bauua eventually reaches Mars, and sends a video recording of himself from there. His rocket gets lost somewhere in space on the return journey, and Aafia waits for him. Fifteen years later, a Chinese space station receives the signal of Bauua's escape pod, which crash lands in the Pacific Ocean, revealing Bauua is still alive.

== Cast ==
- Shah Rukh Khan as Bauua Singh, a young man with dwarfism
- Katrina Kaif as Babita Kumari, an alcoholic actress
- Anushka Sharma as Aafia Yusufzai Bhinder, a NSAR scientist with cerebral palsy
- Abhay Deol as Aditya Kapoor, Babita's love interest
- R. Madhavan as Kartik Srinivasan, a fellow scientist and Aafia's colleague
- Mohammed Zeeshan Ayyub as Guddu Mukhi, Bauua's friend
- Tigmanshu Dhulia as Ashok Singh, Bauua's wealthy and successful businessman father
- Sheeba Chaddha as Beena Singh, Ashok's wife and Bauua's mother
- Brijendra Kala as Dikshit Pandey, an agent
- Preeti Singh as Bauua's sister-in-law
- Mallika Dua as NSAR Volunteer Applicant
- Nataša Stanković as Sonali
- Sushrii Shreya Mishraa as Gunjan

=== Cameo appearances ===
- Salman Khan as himself judging a dance show
- Rani Mukerji as herself at a party
- Karisma Kapoor as herself at a party
- Kajol as herself at a party
- Sridevi as herself at a party
- Juhi Chawla as herself at a party
- Deepika Padukone as herself at a party
- Alia Bhatt as herself at a party
- Ganesh Acharya as himself in a dance show
- Remo D'Souza as himself in a dance show
- Arjun Kapoor as himself at an award show
- Jaya Bachchan as herself at an award show
- Javed Jaffrey (voice-over at a dance competition)
- Ditya Bhande in the song "Mere Naam Tu"
- Rajat Sharma as himself
- Anshul Chauhan as herself

== Production ==
=== Development ===
"Like the way we say that perfect is boring, imperfection is much interesting... Our film is also celebrating the same. The story of the film is celebrating a perfect love story of two imperfect people. Though the protagonist of the film is a dwarf but more than the physical disability of an individual, the story talks about the space of emotional incompleteness of our life."

— Aanand L. Rai on the decision to name the film Zero and its implications

Director Aanand L. Rai conceived the film in 2012 after watching Krrish (2006) and drawing parallels of the titular character with that of American superheroes such as Superman, Batman and Spider-Man. He appreciated the achievement of Indians having their own superhero film but felt wary of the outreach, saying, "I loved seeing Hrithik Roshan fly off a 250-feet building, it was brilliantly done, but deep down I felt this wasn't us. Apart from our mythological demigods, Indians aren't ready for superheroes" and "That's what made me want to live life from the perspective of a dwarf [sic]."

The film was initially titled Katrina Meri Jaan. However, this was later scrapped because the producers thought the title would be too misleading to people and make them presume the film is about Kaif. In between productions, the film underwent numerous working titles such as Bauaa, Bauna, Butka, Bandhua and Batla. Red Chillies Entertainment registered three names for use as the film's title. In the end, a unanimous decision was made to call the film Zero, revealed in January 2018.

Bollywood Hungama reported the budget of the film to be around ₹150 crore. Rai refuted these reports and stated that the film did have a big budget at that time, but less than the reported amount, and that the amount might change. In October 2018, after post-production work was completed, the film's budget was revealed to be ₹2 billion, making it the most expensive film starring Khan. Himanshu Sharma, who wrote the script, confirmed the story to be a romantic drama. He stated that while the story does feature a little person as a character, the plot does not revolve only around that character.

=== Casting ===
Initially, Salman Khan was approached for the role in 2012. The role then went to Shah Rukh Khan. His casting was confirmed in March 2016. He plays a man with dwarfism. Rai cast Khan to play the lead role because he needed a big star for the story to penetrate globally. He needed "an intelligent actor, who also can carry that happy-go-lucky attitude," and he felt Khan possessed those qualities. Rai realised the difference between a six-foot tall person saying "I love you" and a four-foot tall person; hence he hired Khan. Khan is the fifth actor of normal stature in Indian cinema to play a little person after Kamal Haasan in Apoorva Sagodharargal (1989), Johnny Lever in Aashiq (2001), Jagathy Sreekumar in Athbhutha Dweepu (2005) and Anupam Kher in Jaan-E-Mann (2006).

After much speculation, Rai confirmed Anushka Sharma and Katrina Kaif as the female lead actors in the film in June 2017; this would be the second collaboration between the two actresses and Khan after their 2012 film Jab Tak Hai Jaan. While Kaif was the first choice for the first lead, Sharma's role was initially offered to Deepika Padukone and Alia Bhatt who play cameos in the film, they dropped out due to date issues. Sharma was reported to play a disabled person, whereas Kaif confirmed that she will portray the role of an actress. Both Sharma and Kaif were offered the role not because of their stardom but because they fit the role according to Rai. According to Kaif, she was offered the film before Khan was cast. She later confirmed that the script and story of Zero had changed over two years, hinting that Khan recommended this.

Tigmanshu Dhulia portrayed the father of Khan's character. He showed interest in the project after hearing about its heavy technical involvements. Abhay Deol was cast as a love interest, and Madhavan, who had previously worked with Rai in both Tanu Weds Manu films, announced his casting by sharing a selfie with Rai on the film's set in late May 2018. Khan refrained from signing any other film during Zero's production. The film features guest appearances by Salman Khan, Sridevi, Juhi Chawla, Kajol, Rani Mukerji, Karisma Kapoor, Deepika Padukone and Alia Bhatt who will portray themselves. This marked Sridevi’s posthumous appearance in a film, as she died before the film's release shortly after filming.

=== Filming ===
In August 2016, it was said that filming would begin in December 2016. This was later postponed to 2017. Principal photography of the film eventually began in May 2017 in Mumbai. In May, an accident occurred on the set, in which crew members were injured. In June 2017, Khan revealed that only 10 minutes of footage had been completed. Kaif joined the team on 22 September 2017. Sharma started shooting in September. On 8 January, she resumed her shooting after taking a break for a couple of weeks for her wedding. Two days later, Khan was photographed on the sets of the film in suburban Mumbai. The crew took a break during the Makara Sankranti festival. The shoot was also extended to Bandra, Mumbai. Around January 2018, Kajol completed filming for her cameo. Parts of the film were also shot in Dubai. Overall, the film took 200 days to shoot, instead of the originally allotted 140 days.

For the scenes in the film taking place in Meerut, preparations were undertaken by the producers to ensure an authentic setting. A large-scale replica of the city was reproduced in Mumbai's Film City, where special attention was given to recreating the streets (and even buildings like the famed clock-tower) accurately. Director Rai also flew 300 actors from Meerut onto the sets to simulate the "feel" of the town; actors familiar with the Meerut area, like Mohammed Zeeshan Ayyub, also helped Shah Rukh Khan understand and integrate local mannerisms into Bauua's character.

Visual effects were heavily used to make Khan's character three feet tall. According to Khan, this was done as "I would have a problem if I have to do it on my knees. I am trying to avoid that part because that looks unreal also, and in today's time and age, you don't want to do that." The makers took inspiration from the technology used in The Lord of the Rings. Khan noted that he had to be careful about the "little things" in enacting Bauua, such as not making his strides too long, and using a ramp instead of stairs; for many scenes, he would be made to stand in a pit (which would be edited out in post-production), so the other actors would be looking at him from a slightly higher vantage point and hence creating a sense of realism for his short stature. The character was also shot using Forced Perspective, which according to NDTV, is "a technique that employs optical illusion to make an object appear farther away, closer, larger or smaller than it actually is. It will make SRK look shorter." According to Rai, the film will use the most visual effects for an Indian film.

To better prepare for playing a wheelchair user, Sharma met with an occupational therapist and an audiologist, who taught her how to create an involuntary spasm-like action during her dialogue scenes; the occupational therapist was always on set to monitor Sharma's performance. In an interview with The Telegraph, Sharma noted that in the beginning stages of the shoot, shaping the physicality of the character was difficult for her and that she would ask for many more takes than usual because her movements didn't feel correct. During the first schedule, she asked Khan to be more patient with her during their scenes while she got used to the character, which he obliged. She observed that because the character performed involuntary movements, they were very difficult to do and required "heavy breathing, which would get me very tired and my body would go into spasms because I had tightened it so much." She eventually got more comfortable in her performance later on. In between takes, instead of returning to her normal physicality as most actors would, she would stay in the wheelchair, then "go to another mark on my wheelchair and sit there alone. I would rarely leave the wheelchair on set, and ended up staying away from everybody as well."

Kaif was initially relucatant to play Babita; to her the character "seemed like just another film star going through pain," with Kaif herself having recently reached a personal point of equilibrium after coming out a challenging phase in her life. Director Rai eventually convinced her of the role and the internal transformation the character would undertake, with Kaif noting that it was "an intense journey we went on together." Babita's vulnerability, and her continuous struggle to hide her true feelings from the world, appealed to Kaif and she eventually found the character intriguing. She noted that in real life, most people eventually hide their feelings from the real world in some way or another, and that they would find Babita relatable as she was dealing with her own issues and personal insecurities; she would often react defensively or aggressively, and yet the fact that she was "fighting for herself" gave her respectability and makes her interesting to watch.

In the behind-the-scenes video of the making of the song "Mere Naam Tu," Anushka Sharma details the video in a voice-over, and she mentions several aspects of the song's making. She noted that choreographer Remo D'Souza directed the video and brought his trademark creativity, including the inclusion of children, into the song's dance sequence. The sequence was filmed over the course of 14 days, with Sharma mostly wearing pajamas and using a wheelchair for its duration. It was filmed in the corridor of a hotel, yet was transformed into a "fantasy land," with the addition of on-set rain and Holi colours. While on set, wheelchair user Sharma can be seen on an elevated platform while interacting with Shah Rukh Khan's character Bauua, to create the illusion of his short stature.

Most of the film was filmed entirely in Film City. In February 2018, it was reported that the post-production work of a second teaser was being carried out. From 4–8 April 2018, Khan shot the film's schedule in Vasai, Mumbai, flying in a helicopter to avoid the traffic. In middle April, the film's shooting was reported to shift to the United States for a sequence. Some sequences were also filmed in Huntsville, Alabama. Khan finished filming for Zero, and wrapped the film's principal photography in Orlando, during the month of June 2018.

== Music ==
The film's score and soundtrack were composed and produced by Ajay–Atul collaborating with Khan for the first time, while Tanishk Bagchi worked as a guest composer. Lyrics are written by Irshad Kamil and Kumaar. The first single, "Mere Naam Tu" was released on 23 November 2018. It was sung by Abhay Jodhpurkar (who made Bollywood debut) and arranged by Ustad K. Shayan-Hussaini (who also played its piano pieces); other instrumentals include the Indian flute by Varad Kathapurkar and the Nylon guitar by Pawan Rasayli. On 4 December, "Issaqbaazi," the film's second song, was released; a fast-paced, rustic dance number picturised on a jubilant Bauua dancing with Salman Khan after being kissed by Babita, it was sung by Sukhwinder Singh and Divya Kumar, and was composed by Ajay–Atul, with lyrics by Irshad Kamil. The third single track "Husn Parcham" was released on 1 December 2018. The song was sung by Bhoomi Trivedi and Raja Kumari. On 20 December 2018, a fourth song was released, titled "Heer Badnaam." Revealing the stardom and personal issues of Babita Kumari, and depicting Bauua as her long-standing fan, the song is reminiscent of the Punjabi song "Daru Badnaam" by Kamal Kahlon and Param Singh; it is composed by Tanishk Bagchi, lyricised by Kumaar, and sung by Romy. The album was released by T-Series on 7 December 2018.

== Marketing ==
The title of the film was announced by Khan and Rai on 1 January 2018 in a minute long teaser trailer posted on Twitter due to robust demand from fans. The video showed Khan in his dwarf avatar singing and dancing to Mohammed Rafi's "Hum Ko Tum Pe Pyar Aaya". Although neither Kaif nor Sharma appeared in the teaser video, in one of the scenes, Khan wore a jacket with a collage of Kaif's pictures imprinted on it. In less than 24 hours, the video garnered over 3 million views on YouTube alone, and Khan's announcement tweet had over 30,000 likes. Red Chillies Entertainment later announced that Zero-related posts had reached over 10 million views, likes and mentions across various social media platforms like Facebook, YouTube, Twitter and Instagram. The following day, the first teaser poster with the tagline "21st December 2018 se aapke piche" was unveiled by Red Chillies Entertainment, revealing that the film would release on 21 December 2018.

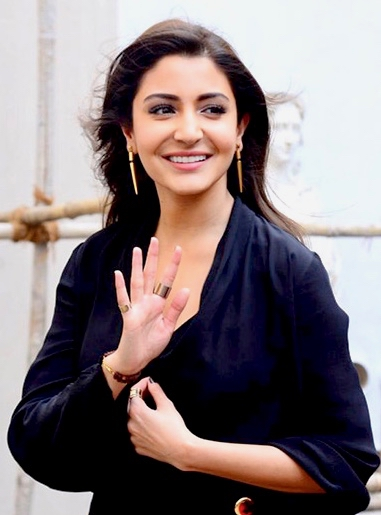
Anushka Sharma promoting Zero

According to Rai, Zero was chosen to be released in December since it is "a month when we celebrate life and what better time for a boy who celebrates that he is physically incomplete and in his incompleteness completes others as he travels from Meerut to New York. There is a beauty in incompleteness we are celebrating." During the Islamic festival of Eid, a promotional teaser was released on 13 June 2018, featuring Shah Rukh and Salman, the latter in the attire sported by him in the film Tiger Zinda Hai (2017). In late August 2018, Rai confirmed to news agency Bollywood Hungama that the trailer for Zero would release on 2 November, Khan's birthday. In late October 2018, as part of the promotional campaign, a verified Twitter account emerged in the name of Bauua, Khan's character from the film, featuring the cartoon version of Bauua Singh's first look and posting humorous tweets.

On 1 November, the day before the release of the trailer, two official posters were revealed by Khan on his social media pages: one featuring Khan's character Bauua Singh and Anushka Sharma's character in Connaught Place in New Delhi, and another with Singh and Katrina Kaif's character in front of Meerut's clock tower. On the morning of 2 November, Director Aanand L. Rai released a third poster on his Twitter page, depicting Khan's Bauua Singh standing on a street near Broadway in New York City. The same day, Red Chillies Entertainment released the official trailer on YouTube. The trailer recorded more than 54 million views within 24 hours, and eventually recorded the fastest 100 million views on YouTube for any Indian film, surpassing Thugs of Hindostan to become YouTube's most-watched Indian trailer of all time. On 10 November, Zero's trailer was screened at the 24th Kolkata International Film Festival in the presence of Khan and West Bengal Chief Minister Mamata Banerjee. On 20 November, Red Chillies Entertainment uploaded an official promo video to their YouTube channel. On the same day, the film's makers launched an exclusive Bauua Singh WhatsApp sticker pack available for download.

On 21 November, in starting a month-long countdown to the release of the film, a humorous behind-the-scenes look was released, entitled "Mera Samosa Waapis Karo" – revealing Director Aanand L. Rai's fondness for samosas and Shah Rukh Khan's playful prank on him about it. Also on 21 November, Red Chillies Entertainment tweeted to announce official merchandise for the film – including phone covers, mugs, shirts, and headphone sets – which would be available for purchase on their company website's store page. On 22 November, Red Chillies Entertainment revealed a new film poster depicting Bauua kissing Aafia on the forehead in front of a large sunlit dome-arched window, and announced that the first song of the film would release the following day. On 23 November, the first song of the film was released, titled "Mere Naam Tu"; an orchestral ballad picturised on Bauua as he sweepingly proclaims his love for Aafia, it was composed by Ajay–Atul, lyricised by Irshad Kamil and sung by Abhay Jodhpurkar.

On 30 November, Red Chillies Entertainment announced a fan-interaction website, called "Bauua Ki Toli." By completing social-media related activities and earning points, fans can earn the chance to become Bauua's "Khaasam Khaas" and win Zero merchandise, personalised autographed posters from Shah Rukh Khan, as well as movie ticket cashback from Paytm and exclusive Bauua apparel. On 2 December, the producers released a new poster, featuring Khan's Bauua Singh being held by Salman Khan in the centre-stage of a crowded dance hall, announcing the release of a new song, "Issaqbaazi."

On 5 December, Shah Rukh Khan flew to Dubai to promote the film, greeting fans at a club on the rooftop of the Meydan Racecourse's grandstand; the following day, he entertained 100,000 viewers at Dubai's Global Village, dancing to several hit songs from his films. On 7 December, he travelled to Muscat (Oman), and Kuwait as part of the film's promotional tour. On 7 December, Red Chillies Entertainment uploaded onto YouTube a behind-the-scenes video of the making of the "Mere Naam Tu" music video. On 10 December, a teaser for a new song was released, "Husn Parcham." On 14 December, a new dialogue promo featuring Bauua Singh was released, called "Bhabhi Ke Naam Ki Biryani," revealing his relationship with his father and his "quirky sense of humor."

In late December, Red Chillies Entertainment partnered with Amazon to bring an interactive Bauua Singh voice (available only in India) to their Alexa device, Echo smart speakers, and other Alexa built-in devices, which allows users to listen to his "jokes, anecdotes, and poetry" as requested; the producers have also released special GIFs from the film that can be used across all social-media platforms. Zero also partnered with Snapchat to become the first film in India to use their Augmented Reality Lens' feature promotionally; users applying the Lens can transform into Bauua, with his sunglasses and a garland around them, and will be "able to interact with the plotline of the movie." Shah Rukh Khan debuted the feature on Snapchat himself, sharing a story using the Lens. On 18 December 2018, a fourth poster for the film was released to announce advance-show bookings, showing Bauua sitting on the railing of a high-rise building, with one arm around a chimpanzee, and his other arm pointing up at the sky.

A fifth poster was also released by Red Chillies Entertainment on the same day, depicting Bauua and Aafia in a zero-gravity simulator, holding onto each other's arms, with an enlarged and well-lit moon and sky in the background.

== Release ==
=== Theatrical ===
Zero was released on 21 December 2018. According to film trade analyst Taran Adarsh, it was shown on 4380 screens in India and 1585 overseas (noting that additional international territories will open later), for a worldwide total of 5965 screens. Domestically, the film had the third-widest release of all Hindi films released in 2018, behind only Thugs of Hindostan (5000 screens) and Race 3 (4400 screens).

In mid-December 2018, the film passed the British Board of Film Classification with a certified 12A rating and a 164-minute runtime. In Pakistan, Zero was cleared by the Central Board of Film Censors without any cuts. It was released in 156 screens across the country by local distributor Eveready Pictures, which is said to be the highest number of screens for any film in Pakistan. The film, which was initially planned for a 20 December 2018 release in Germany, was postponed on 17 January 2019, to ensure a wider release. The film released in China in March 2019. Zero was the closing film of Beijing International Film Festival.

=== Home media ===
Upon release on home video in 2019, Zero became the top-selling film on the Google Play Store, beating Bohemian Rhapsody and A Star is Born.

== Reception ==
=== Box office ===
Zero collected ₹18.78 Crore at the Indian box office on its first day. In its three-day opening weekend, the film earned approximately ₹53 Crore domestically. It earned on Monday ₹9.5 Crore and on Tuesday (Christmas holiday) ₹12.75 Crore in domestic circuit. The USA Box office collection of Zero on Day 2 (22 December) was $283,808 (₹19.9 million) from 262 screens. The total domestic gross collection of the film is ₹87 Crore, and the overseas gross collection was $14 million according to Box Office India. The film's worldwide gross collection is ₹191 Crore. The film was considered highly unsuccessful.

=== Critical response ===
On the review aggregator website Rotten Tomatoes, 31% of 16 critics' reviews are positive, with an average rating of 4.7/10.

Zero released to mixed reviews from critics. Most praised the film's visual effects and agreed that Kaif gave the best performance of her career, while they were critical about its plot, which was "cut short by the resources at hand", and that the second half in particular was "aimless" and "scattered." Baradwaj Rangan gave the film 3.5 stars out of five, saying the film was "all heart" and that he found it "easy to embrace". He called the film Rai's most "fluid" film yet, and mentioned that Khan was "fantastic". Raja Sen of the Hindustan Times gave the film 3.5 out of 5 stars, calling the first half of the film "flat-out fantastic, an unabashed charm-offensive," and noting that the writing and dialogues "crackle with spontaneity and inventiveness." Yet he says that when the film outgrows the small town of Meerut, it finds it hard to keep its witty nature along with the ambitious second half; where the film should have "gone bonkers," it takes a melodramatic approach that doesn't work. Sen commends the actors, particularly Sharma's commitment to the role and Khan's tremendous energy. He implies that Khan saves the film with his trademark acting, regardless of the film's writing issues. Swetha Ramakrishnan of Firstpost praised the "ambitious" nature of the film and called it "extremely self-aware," particularly in its first half, crediting it for grounding the plot in warmth. She praised Sharma's "impassioned" role and Kaif's performance as a strong yet vulnerable actress, and commended both actresses for digging into their roles. She also praised Khan's charm and wrote, "You may or may not like the film, but you will most certainly fall in love with Bauua Singh." However, she noted that the second half felt "surreal" and that it was hard to keep up with, saying that it "falls prey to the second-half curse". Rachit Gupta of The Times of India gave the film 3 out of 5 stars, saying the film had an "inspiring concept" yet was poorly executed. He said that while the film puts forth many ideas, few of them stick and the romantic moments and visuals, while striking, only stay for a little while. The film felt too long and the second half, when Bauua travels out of his hometown, feels more audacious than the first. Yet the positive is that the characters stay upbeat despite their challenges, and the lead actors (particularly Kaif in a striking role) give good performances. Gupta concludes in saying that while the film builds up an exciting story well, it doesn't quite finish it in the way the viewer would anticipate. Ankur Pathak of Huffington Post India praised the performances of the leads, yet says that the film was "weighed down by its own excesses." While the film was ambitious, it was mostly "heightened and exaggerated and hyper-glamorized." He called the main characters excellent, and praised Khan's performance, with Kaif being "a huge revelation" and acting in ways hitherto unseen. Yet the "starkly different, bizarre visual language of the second half hampers the overall experience of the movie." Despite this, Pathak believes that Khan's performance saves the film and that "although this ride has a few breakdowns, overall, one comes out smiling..."

Rajeev Masand of News18 gave the film 2 out of 5 stars, saying that while the first half was impressive, the ambitious screenplay and ideas were plagued by an "overwrought screenplay" and that the second half that "feels like an entirely different film." He commended the effort of the actors and producers, particularly the acting of Khan; yet noted that the second half becomes undone. He said it seemed as if the writers " threw everything at the wall and decided to see what sticks. Unfortunately, very little does." Anupama Chopra of Film Companion gave the film 2 out of 5 stars, saying that it was so "bizarre and implausible and incoherent" despite having "ferociously talented people both in front of the camera and behind it." She says in the second half the "promising premise derails;" while the individual characters are interesting, the "connective tissue between...is so thin that the narrative starts to wobble." She praised the VFX, scope and imaginative feel, but was "sad" that the artistic ambition of the creators wasn't achieved. Saibal Chatterjee of NDTV gave the film 2 out of 5 stars, noting that while the impressive acting of the leads and stellar visual effects aided the film, ultimately the screenplay was its undoing and left it a "monumental mess." The plot was undermined by a "slew of whimsicalities that defy logic and an uneven tone that borders on the gratuitously facetious." He notes that while Khan's electric performance powers the film, it never gives the film enough to make sense, noting that the second half "flies too high and too helter-skelter." He commended the physical efforts of Sharma's acting and Kaif's vulnerability, yet felt that the film aimed too high without sensitively portraying the struggles of disabled people.

Anna MM Vetticad of Firstpost gave the film 1.5 out of 5 stars, saying that Shah Rukh Khan is the best part about it, and that without him the film would have little to show; the first half lets the actor have fun to the hilt, while the second tries to take a serious message but fails to deliver properly. She noted that while Zero does not have the misogyny of Rai's previous films, it also "does not know what to do with" its female characters – while commending Bauua's sharp wit and strong character in facing the odds of life. Writer Sharma doesn't know how to write about relatable women – and thus Aafia and Babita come off as "bores." Overall, the film was "a spluttering, tottering affair."

== Accolades ==
Award (Note: Awards, festivals and organisations are in alphabetical order.)	Date of ceremony (Note: Date is linked to the article about the awards held that year, wherever possible.)	Category	Recipient(s)	Result	Ref.
Filmfare Awards	23 March 2019	Best Actor	Shah Rukh Khan	Nominated	
Filmfare Awards	23 March 2019	Best Supporting Actress	Katrina Kaif	Nominated	
Filmfare Awards	23 March 2019	Best Music Director	Ajay–Atul	Nominated	
Filmfare Awards	23 March 2019	Best Lyricist	Irshad Kamil – (for "Mere Naam Tu")	Nominated	
Filmfare Awards	23 March 2019	Best Male Playback Singer	Abhay Jodhpurkar – (for "Mere Naam Tu")	Nominated	
Filmfare Awards	23 March 2019	Best Choreography	Remo D'Souza – (for "Mere Naam Tu")	Nominated	
Filmfare Awards	23 March 2019	Best Special Effects	Red Chillies VFX	Won	
International Indian Film Academy Awards	18 September 2019	Best Lyricist	Irshad Kamil – (for "Mere Naam Tu")	Nominated	
International Indian Film Academy Awards	18 September 2019	Best Male Playback Singer	Abhay Jodhpurkar – (for "Mere Naam Tu")	Nominated	
Mirchi Music Awards	16 February 2019	Upcoming Male Vocalist of The Year	Abhay Jodhpurkar – (for "Mere Naam Tu")	Won	
Zee Cine Awards	19 March 2019	Best Actor in a Supporting Role – Female	Katrina Kaif	Won	
Zee Cine Awards	19 March 2019	Best Lyricist	Irshad Kamil – (for "Mere Naam Tu")	Nominated	
Zee Cine Awards	19 March 2019	Best Playback Singer – Male	Abhay Jodhpurkar – (for "Mere Naam Tu")	Nominated	
Zee Cine Awards	19 March 2019	Best Special Effects	Red Chillies VFX	Won	
