= Padmaavat (soundtrack) =

- Soundtrack album cover

Soundtrack album by Sanjay Leela Bhansali
- Released: 6 January 2018
- Studios: Wow & Flutter Studios, Mumbai
- Genre: Bollywood Film Soundtrack
- Length: 21:44
- Language: Hindi
- Label: T-Series
- Producers: Shail Hada; Sanchit Balhara; Jackie Vanjari; Pritesh

Sanjay Leela Bhansali chronology
Bajirao Mastani (2015)	Padmaavat (2018)	Malaal (2019)

Singles from Padmaavat
- 1. "Ghoomar" Released: 25 October 2017; 2. "Ek Dil Ek Jaan" Released: 11 November 2017

Padmaavat is the soundtrack album, composed by Sanjay Leela Bhansali to the 2018 Hindi film of the same name. The film stars Shahid Kapoor, Deepika Padukone and Ranveer Singh in lead roles. The album, originally recorded in Hindi features six songs, and was released on 6 January 2018 by T-Series. The original score of the film is composed by Sanchit Balhara.

The soundtrack album incorporates tracks covering the genres notably Rajasthani folk ("Ghoomar", "Holi"), fusion ("Khalibali", "Ek Dil, Ek Jaan") and middle-eastern ("Binte Dil"), all emphasising on rhythmic arrangements. These five tracks were used in the film for picturization whereas the remaining one ("Nainowale Ne") appeared in the soundtrack album. The original score blends the middle eastern music and Rajasthani folk through brass and string sections of European Classical music. The "Jauhar Theme" gained positive response from viewers in India. It was featured in the trailer and climax of the film.

Upon release, the soundtrack album received positive to mixed response from the music critics. Critics based in India called it "shortest music album" by Bhansali and positively anticipated for the tracks to match the visuals on screen. They opined the tracks to be distinguishable but identifiable with the composers recent usual style of composition, resembling with his previous work Bajirao Mastani, remarkably the track "Khalibali" to "Malhari". However, "Ghoomar" and "Binte Dil" received positive critical acclaim for both composition and picturisation by overseas as well as Indian music critics.

== Development ==
In July 2016, singer Shreya Ghoshal through her Twitter account revealed that she had recorded songs for the film. The song titled "Ghoomar" was filmed by November 2016. It is a Rajasthani folk track. In an interview with Press Trust of India, Ghoshal stated that the album is a fusion of folk and has a Sri Lankan connect because of the character based on Rani Padmini. Apart from the song "Ghoomar", Ghoshal had recorded three more songs for the soundtrack album but because of the changes in the film script, her songs were unused. The makers removed those songs after the recommendations from the CBFC. Bhansali, in an interview with The Times of India stated: "Ghoomar is the glory of Rajasthan and the folk music." He wanted to revive the music and dance form of ghoomar. Bhansali wanted to make the audience understand the "taal", "laya", rhythm pattern and associated dance form through the song "Ghoomar". A. M. Turaz, the lyricist of "Ghoomar" stated that he had picked up some words from the people of Rajasthan when he had been there for music research. He was quoted saying, "The traditional Ghoomar is basically to showcase happiness. Rajasthani women used to do ghoomar when they were happy." The song was written 2-3 times as the lyricist wanted to tell a story through "Ghoomar".

Turaz, on his track "Ek Dil, Ek Jaan" centred the lyrics of the song one the line "Mohabbat Ke Bina Koi Tarraki Mumkin Nahi Hai" which translates in English to: "Without Love, No Success is Possible". He was quoted saying: "I tried to write love in this song. Rani Padmavati loved her husband a lot and that’s what I tried to showcase in the song." The song "Nainowale Ne" is a romantic composition. On recording the track, Bhansali briefed Neeti Mohan that the melody should have an old world charm but blend of contemporary and modern.

Sanchit Balhara, who composed the film score for Padmaavat, stated that he got into acquaintance with Rajasthani scholars and learned how the Khiljis traveled from Rann to Afghanistan and eventually settled in Delhi. So, Balhara's musical preparation revolved around that era. He began scoring by conceiving the main theme of the film. The theme was titled as "Jauhar Theme". The "Jauhar Theme" was composed before the film was shot. Bhansali gave the exact scene briefing to Balhara. The theme represents set of emotions in the character Rani Padmavati. Rather than having any instrument to play the theme, he composed the humming, calling it "relatable". Later, the musical arrangements were made to them. On recording the traditional instruments, he used a lot of Sindhi sarangi, Alghoza, Murchang, Rajasthani Dhol, Murali, Narh and folk chants. These instruments were used for scenes portraying the Rajputs in the film whereas to represent the Khilji's culture, Balhara recorded folk instruments from Turkey, Iran and Afghanistan, especially use of the Zurna. To blend the score into one, he used European classical instruments like strings section and brass section.

== Critical response ==
=== India ===
Vipin Nair for The Hindu stated: "This is probably the shortest soundtrack for a Bhansali movie in a very long time, but is still largely identifiable with the filmmaker’s usual musical style. Padmaavat rates among the better albums Bhansali has delivered as composer." On the contrary critic Namrata Joshi for the same newspaper opined, "He [Bhansali] also has a great ear for music and orchestrates some pulsating choreography in song-and-dance set pieces. In Padmaavat, however, neither does he manage to hit the right notes when it comes to the soundtrack nor is there a single sequence which lingers on." Reviewing the soundtrack, Suanshu Khurana of The Indian Express stated: "Bhansali is a better composer than director. The statement is being made after seven consecutive films which have been very interesting musically. No director-composer, except perhaps Vishal Bhardwaj, can match the rich compositional tapestries Bhansali is capable of weaving. Some tracks work while some just don’t. Buy it for Bhansali’s distinct sound and the exuberance only he can offer" Critic based at Times Now, Gaurang Chauhan stated: "One of the best music albums in recent times." Joginder Tuteja of Bollywood Hungama wrote: "Padmaavat boasts of a classy soundtrack and though the music release has been late in the day, the film’s success should propel its popularity in quick time." Critic Taran Adarsh stated, "One cannot ignore the compositions/soundtrack in a Bhansali film. His music, like the images brought to the screen, should’ve added depth to the emotions of the characters, but is strictly okay this time." Mayur Sanap of Deccan Chronicle opined, "Music by Sanjay Bhansali is good enough, but the songs appear a redo of his previous work. While ‘Ghoomar’,’Ek Dil Ek Jaan’ are visually appealing, Ranveer's futile dance number ‘Khalbali’ reminds you of Bajirao Mastani’s ‘Malhari’."

=== Overseas ===
At Firstpost, critic Anna Vetticad pointed out, "Apart from the tuneful song "Binte Dil" and brief snatches of the background score, even the music does not match up to what Bhansali's films have delivered in the past." In his review for The Village Voice, Siddhant Adlakha called the song "Ghoomar" graceful and "Binte Dil" as the first mainstream Bollywood musical number about queer love. Neil Soans of The Times of India stated: "The songs don’t do much to further the narrative other than providing visual delight." Lisa Tsering of The Hollywood Reporter stated: "Padmaavat's classically inspired music lend elegance to the film without overpowering it". Simon Abrams, critic based at Roger Ebert, stated: "This setpiece (Khalibali) is so rousing that it stands out as the best musical number in a film full of strong vocal performances and well-conceived choreography." Rachna Raj Kaur for Now Toronto wrote: "The disappointing soundtrack adds little pizzazz. Hit song Ghoomar comes early, with forgettable follow-ups until Binte Dil." Musana Ahmed of Film Inquiry stated: "The music is, again, on point with a few outstanding dance numbers including one where Alauddin hammers you over the head with his feelings." Critic Graeme Tuckett of Stuff commented: "Padmaavat has a series of wildly overblown and deeply fabulous song and dance numbers."

== Track listing ==
All music composed by Sanjay Leela Bhansali. Each original track (Hindi) was re-recorded into its Tamil and Telugu counterpart, except the track "Nainowale Ne".

=== Original ===
Padmaavat (Original Motion Picture Soundtrack)
No.	Title	Lyrics	Singer(s)	Length
1.	"Ghoomar"	A. M. Turaz	Shreya Ghoshal, Swaroop Khan	4:42
2.	"Ek Dil Ek Jaan"	A. M. Turaz	Shivam Pathak, Mujtaba Aziz Naza	3:40
3.	"Khalibali"	A. M. Turaz	Shivam Pathak, Shail Hada	4:19
4.	"Nainowale Ne (Not used in the film)"	Siddharth-Garima	Neeti Mohan	2:55
5.	"Holi"	Traditional	Richa Sharma, Shail Hada	2:56
6.	"Binte Dil"	A. M. Turaz	Arijit Singh	3:12
Total length:				21:44

=== Tamil ===
All lyrics are written by Madhan Karky.

No.	Title	Singer(s)	Length
1.	"Unadhallavaa?"	Rahul Vaidya, Shivam Pathak	3:39
2.	"Goomar"	Shreya Ghoshal (Additional Vocals: Divya Kumar)	4:41
3.	"Misiriya"	Vijay Prakash, Shashi Suman	3:12
4.	"Karaipurandoadudhey Kanaa"	Divya Kumar, Nakash Aziz	4:18
5.	"Holi"	Richa Sharma, Shail Hada	2:56

=== Telugu ===
All lyrics are written by Chaitanya Prasad.

No.	Title	Singer(s)	Length
1.	"Oka Praanam... Oka Jeevitham"	Rahul Vaidya, Shivam Pathak	3:39
2.	"Jhoommani Jhoommani Aade"	Shreya Ghoshal. Divya Kumar	4:41
3.	"Vinthagaa Merise Aame"	Vijay Prakash, Shashi Suman	3:12
4.	"Gaji Biji"	Divya Kumar, Nakash Aziz	4:18
5.	"Holi Aadaali"	Richa Sharma, Arijit Singh	2:56

=== Kannada ===
All lyrics are written by Arundathi Vasista.

No.	Title	Singer(s)	Length
1.	"E Deha E Athamavu"	Bharath Nayak	2:25
2.	"Ghoomar"	Darshan N, Sparsha RK	5:16
3.	"Hrudayada Odathiye Baa"	Abhishek	2:49
4.	"Khalibali"	Darshan N	4:05
5.	"Holi"	Sparsha RK	3:38

== Release history ==
The soundtrack album was delayed due to the nationwide controversy on the film content. This resulted in a title change from Padmavati to Padmaavat. It resulted in repackaging of physical formats of the soundtrack album that were supposed to release along with the initial release of the film.

Album	Region/Country	Date	Format	Ref.
Padmaavat (Original)	Worldwide	6 January 2018	Digital download	
Padmaavat (Original)	India	25 January 2018	CD	
Padmaavat (Original)	USA	14 February 2018	CD	
Padmaavat (Tamil)	Worldwide	12 January 2018	Digital download	
Padmaavat (Telugu)	Worldwide	12 January 2018	Digital download	

== Album credits ==
=== Soundtrack album ===
Credits adapted from CD liner notes of the album and closing credits of the original film footage.

- Sanchit Balhara – Original film score composer, orchestrator, Music production ("Ek Dil, Ek Jaan"), music arranger
- Swaroop Khan – Rajasthani lyrics & backing vocals ("Ghoomar")
- Mujtaba Aziz Naza, Farhan Sabri, Kunal Pandit – Qawwali ("Ek Dil, Ek Jaan")
- Manganiyar & Langa – Additional folk music for the track "Holi"
- Tanay Gajjar – Recording, mixing and mastering
- Shail Hada – Music production ("Ghoomar", "Khalibali", "Nainowale Ne", "Holi"), music associate
- Pritesh – Music production ("Ghoomar", "Khalibali")
- Jackie Vanjari – Music production ("Binte Dil")
- Rupak Thakur – Music assistance
- Shreyas Puranik – Music associate, backing vocals (Nainowale Ne)
- Shashi Suman – Music associates, backing vocals (Nainowale Ne)
- Vijay Dayal – Recording Engineer ("Khali Bali")
- Kunal Pandit – Backing vocals ("Nainowale Ne", "Ghoomar")
- Meenal Jain – Backing vocals ("Nainowale Ne")
- Prajakta Shukre – Backing vocals ("Nainowale Ne")
- Aditi Paul – Backing vocals ("Nainowale Ne", "Ghoomar")
- Prithvi Gandhar – Backing vocals ("Ghoomar")
- Pratibha Singh Baghel – Backing vocals ("Ghoomar")
- Kalpana Gandharva – Backing vocals ("Ghoomar")
- Tarannum Malik – Backing vocals ("Ghoomar")

==== Instruments' credits ====
- Papal Mane – bass guitar
- Rutvik Talashikar – acoustic and bass guitars
- Shyam Edwankar – percussion
- Bhagirath Bhatt, Dhimant Varman – sitar
- Sanjoy Das – guitars
- Satyajit Jamsandekar – live rhythm, percussion
- Shikhar Naad Qureshi – live rhythm, percussion
- Dipesh Varma – live rhythm, percussion
- Prashant Sonagra – percussion, dhol
- Tapas Roy – Strokes
- Dilshad – Sarangi
