= Pataakha =

2018 Indian Hindi film directed by Vishal Bhardwaj

- Theatrical release poster
- Directed by: Vishal Bhardwaj
- Written by: Vishal Bhardwaj
- Story by: Charan Singh Pathik
- Produced by: Vishal Bhardwaj; Rekha Bhardwaj; Dheeraj Wadhavan; Ajay Kapoor; Ishan Saksena; Abhinav Jain
- Starring: Sanya Malhotra; Radhika Madan
- Cinematography: Ranjan Palit
- Edited by: A. Sreekar Prasad
- Music by: Vishal Bhardwaj
- Production companies: KYTA Productions; Vishal Bhardwaj Films
- Distributed by: B4U Motion Pictures; Eros International
- Release date: 28 September 2018
- Running time: 134 minutes
- Country: India
- Language: Hindi
- Budget: 12 crores
- Box office: 6.95 crores

Pataakha (pronounced [pəʈaːkʰaː]; transl. Firecracker) is a 2018 Indian Hindi-language drama film produced, written and directed by Vishal Bhardwaj. It stars Sanya Malhotra and debutante Radhika Madan. The plot is based on Charan Singh Pathik's short story Do Behnein. It was theatrically released worldwide on 28 September 2018.

== Synopsis ==
Badki and Chhutki live in a small town in Rajasthan. They are sisters who quarrel about everything from stolen beedi to torn clothes. Dipper is their nosy neighbour, who is always on the lookout for an opportunity to make the sisters go to war, while their father, a single parent, is always trying to make peace between the warring sisters.

== Cast ==
- Radhika Madan as Champa 'Badki' Kumari
- Sanya Malhotra as Genda 'Chuttki' Kumari
- Sunil Grover as Dipper Naradmuni
- Vijay Raaz as Shanti Bhushan
- Lankesh Bhardwaj as Govt. Officer
- Rohit Sukhwani as Champak
- Saanand Verma as Tharki Patel
- Namit Das as Jagan
- Abhishek Duhan as Vishnu
- Vishal Dahiya
- Dev Rajora as dairy manager
- Sameer Khakkar as Sarpanch
- Usha Nagar as Grandmother
- Malaika Arora (special appearance in song "Hello Hello")

== Production ==
=== Development ===
Impressed with Charan Singh Pathik's short story Do Behnein (Two Sisters) published by Sahitya Kala Academy, Vishal Bhardwaj decided to purchase the rights of the story and turn it into a film. In December 2017 it was reported that Kriti Sanon was the first choice of the director for the role of the younger sister and the actress had even auditioned for the part but talks did not go through. For the role of the elder sister a number of actresses including Parineeti Chopra, Bhumi Pednekar, Sonakshi Sinha, Vaani Kapoor and Shraddha Kapoor were auditioned but none of them were finalised. In March 2018, Sanya Malhotra was finalised for the role of Genda Kumari, the younger sister, while in April 2018 television actress Radhika Madan was selected to play Champa Kumari, the elder sister, a role for which over 60 girls were auditioned. On 17 April 2018, it was reported that Vijay Raaz and Sunil Grover had been signed to be a part of the film. While Vijay was selected to play the role of the father of the two sisters in the film, Sunil's role was described as that of a person who instigates fights between the sisters.

As part of preparation for the role, Sanya Malhotra and Radhika Madan stayed in Ronsi village near Jaipur in Rajasthan and apart from learning the Rajasthani dialect, the actresses also got accustomed with milking Buffaloes, thatching roofs, plastering the walls with dung and walking for long distances while balancing matkas full of water on their head and one around their waist. Sanya and Radhika also had to put on 10 kg of weight for the second part of the story where both of them are married and have a child each. Initially the film was titled Chhuriyaan (transl. Knives) but was later on changed to Pataakha (transl. Firecracker) because Bhardwaj felt it might confuse the audience considering the multiple meanings that can be derived from it if not pronounced correctly.

=== Filming ===
The principal photography of the film began in Udaipur, Rajasthan at the end of April 2018. The first schedule of the film came to an end on 16 May 2018. The final schedule of filming began in Mount Abu on 29 June 2018 and was completed on 12 July 2018. The item song featuring Malaika Arora and choreographed by Ganesh Acharya was filmed towards the end of August.

== Soundtrack ==
Pataakha

Soundtrack album by Vishal Bhardwaj
- Released: 12 September 2018
- Recorded: 2018
- Genre: Feature film soundtrack
- Length: 18:17
- Language: Hindi
- Label: Zee Music Company
- Producer: Ketan Sodha

Vishal Bhardwaj chronology
Rangoon (2017)	Pataakha (2018)	Sonchiriya (2019)
External audio
- Official Audio Jukebox on YouTube

The music of the film has been composed by Vishal Bhardwaj, while the lyrics have been written by Gulzar.

No.	Title	Singer(s)	Length
1.	"Balma"	Rekha Bhardwaj, Sunidhi Chauhan	3:51
2.	"Pataakha"	Vishal Bhardwaj	3:37
3.	"Hello Hello"	Rekha Bhardwaj	3:27
4.	"Naina Banjare"	Arijit Singh	3:31
5.	"Gali Gali"	Sukhwinder Singh	3:41
Total length:			18:17
