= Ghoomar (song) =

- Cover for the song, featuring Deepika Padukone

Song by Shreya Ghoshal and Swaroop Khan

from the album Padmaavat
- Language: Hindi; Rajasthani
- Released: 25 October 2017
- Recorded: 12 July 2016
- Studio: Wow & Flutter, Mumbai
- Genre: Filmi; World; Rajasthani folk
- Length: 4:41
- Label: T-Series
- Composer: Sanjay Leela Bhansali
- Lyricists: A. M. Turaz (Hindi); Swaroop Khan (Rajasthani
- Producer: Shail-Pritesh

Music videos
- "Ghoomar" on YouTube

"Ghoomar" is a song sung by Shreya Ghoshal and Swaroop Khan from the soundtrack album of the 2018 film Padmaavat. The music of the song was composed by Sanjay Leela Bhansali while the lyrics were provided by A. M. Turaz and Swaroop Khan. The music video of the track features Deepika Padukone, Shahid Kapoor and Anupriya Goenka. The movie is dubbed in Tamil and Telugu and hence the song was also released as "Goomar" in Tamil and "Jhoommani Jhoommani Aade" in Telugu. The Tamil and Telugu versions as well were sung by Ghoshal while the Kannada version was sung by Darshan N and Sparsha RK.

== Development ==
On 12 July 2016, Shreya Ghoshal recorded "Ghoomar" which was mixed and mastered by Tanay Gajjar at Wow & Flutter Studio in Mumbai. Ghoshal considered the track as a "landmark" in her career. The music video of the track features Deepika Padukone, Shahid Kapoor and Anupriya Goenka. Padukone had undergone training with a Rajasthani dance teacher Jyoti D Tommar, on a routine of three hours a day for twelve days. She did over sixty six twirls during the shooting of the song. Filming for the song was completed in four days. The song was named from the traditional Rajasthani folk dance Ghoomar which is characterized by its signature twirls. Padukone considered the song as "one of the most difficult song sequences" she had performed. Padukone's look for the "Ghoomar" song features intricate jewellery weighing up to 3 kg designed by Tanishq featuring a triple Borla, Mathapatti and Bajuband which are traditional ornaments worn by the Rajasthani women. Also, she wore a lehenga designed by Rimple Narula which costs approximately (₹2 million) and weighs 30 kg.

== Music video ==
"Ghoomar" was released on 25 October 2017 where Deepika Padukone was seen performing the traditional Rajasthani folk dance on a set that replicates the interior of Chittorgarh Fort.

=== Synopsis ===
It features Padukone as Rani Padmavati, performing Ghoomar along with sixty chorus dancers, in front of Mahrawal Ratan Singh (Shahid Kapoor) and his first wife Nagmati (Anupriya Goenka). It was choreographed by Kruti Mahesh and Jyoti D Tommar. The colour palette of the video is majorly pale golden and light brown.

== Release and reception ==
The song was released on 25 October 2017 on T-Series YouTube channel. On the same day of release, it was made available for online streaming at Saavn and Gaana. It garnered more than 10 Million views within 24 hours and gained highest number of views for T-Series in 24 hours. Apart from trending worldwide, it was trended at top position in India on Twitter. It also trended at second position on YouTube (India) for several days and completed 100 million views on 27 January 2018.

=== Controversy ===
Upon release, the song along with the film became controversial. On Twitter, complaints against the song was echoed, claiming that it portrays the Rajput queen Padmavati in a bad light. In November 2017, protests were held against the song claiming that "Rajput queens never danced before anybody". Women from Rajput community joined protests and criticised the song; "The queen is shown performing the ghoomar dance in indecent clothes, which is a faulty portrayal of Rajputs. A Rajput queen would never perform before an audience nor bare her midriff". On 22 November 2017, an Education Officer in Dewas issued an order prohibiting the use of "Ghoomar", in any school function. However, a day later the district collector ordered the withdrawal of the circular with immediate effect. On 17 January 2018, it was reported that Home Minister of Madhya Pradesh, Bhupendra Singh remarked that the song "should not be played as the release of the film was banned in the state" during the time, which he denied a day later.

On 30 December 2017, it was reported that Central Board of Film Certification's examining committee asked the film's producers to remove the shots revealing Padukone's midriff for a more modest representation of Padmavati. However, Sanjay Leela Bhansali preferred to bring relevant modifications through computer graphics. On 20 January 2018, a new version of the song was released, which covers Padukone's midriff via computer-generated imagery.

=== Other versions ===
The film is dubbed in Tamil and Telugu and Kannada languages and hence the song was also released in both languages on 12 January 2018 while the song for the Kannada version was later released. The Tamil version of the song, "Goomar" is by Shreya Ghoshal with additional vocals by Divya Kumar and lyrics by Madhan Karky. The Telugu version, "Jhoommani Jhoommani Aade" is again sung by Shreya Ghoshal with additional vocals by Divya Kumar while the lyrics are penned by Chaitanya Prasad. The Kannada version, "Ghoomar" was sung by Darshan N and Sparsha RK while lyrics are penned by Arundathi Vasista.

== Accolades ==
| Year | Award Ceremony | Nominee | Category | Result |
|---|---|---|---|---|
| 2019 | Filmfare Awards | Shreya Ghoshal | Best Female Playback Singer | Won |
| 2019 | Filmfare Awards | Kruti Mahesh, Jyothi D Tommar | Best Choreography | Won |
| 2019 | National Film Awards | Kruti Mahesh, Jyothi D Tommar | Best Choreography | Won |
| 2019 | Zee Cine Awards | Kruti Mahesh, Jyothi D Tommar | Best Choreography | Won |
| 2019 | Mirchi Music Awards | Shreya Ghoshal | Female Vocalist of the year | Won |
| 2019 | Mirchi Music Awards | Sanjay Leela Bhansali, Shreya Ghoshal, Swaroop Khan, A. M. Turaz | Song of the Year | Won |
| 2019 | Mirchi Music Awards | Tanay Gajjar, Rahul Sharma | Best Song Engineer (Recording & Mixing) | Won |
| 2019 | Mirchi Music Awards | Sanjay Leela Bhansali, Shreya Ghoshal, Swaroop Khan, A. M. Turaz | Raag-Inspired Song of the Year | Nominated |
| 2019 | Star Screen Awards | Shreya Ghoshal | Best Female Playback | Nominated |
| 2019 | Star Screen Awards | Kruti Mahesh, Jyothi D Tommar | Best Choreography | Won |
| 2019 | Sony Mix Audience Music Awards | Best Playback Singer (Female) | Shreya Ghoshal | Nominated |
| 2019 | Koimoi Bollywood Awards | Best Female Singer | Shreya Ghoshal | Won |
| 2019 | Gaana User's Choice Awards | Best Female Singer | Shreya Ghoshal | Won |
| 2021 | 13th Mirchi Music Awards | Female Vocalist of the Decade | Shreya Ghoshal | Nominated |
| 2021 | 13th Mirchi Music Awards | Song of the Decade | Sanjay Leela Bhansali, Shreya Ghoshal, Swaroop Khan, A. M. Turaz | Nominated |
