= Swaroop Khan =

Indian singer

- Born: 7 August 1991; Jaisalmer, Rajasthan, India
- Origin: Indian
- Genres: Folk & Lori
- Occupation: Singer
- Years active: 2008–present
- Website: http://swaroopkhan.in

Swaroop Khan is an Indian playback folk singer from Rajasthan. He is known for his popular songs "Tharki Chokro" in PK and Ghoomar in Padmaavat. He had contested in the Indian Idol Season 5 in 2010, and was given his first opportunity in Bollywood to sing on the title track of The Film Emotional Atyachar by composer Bappi Lahiri who was impressed by Swaroop's versatility.

== Discography ==
=== Hindi songs ===
Year	Film	Song	Co-Singer(s)
2010	The Film Emotional Atyachar	"Emotional Atyachar" (Title Track)	
2014	PK	"Tharki Chokro"	
2014	Hawaa Hawaai	"Hawaa Hawaai"	
2014	Filmistaan	"Udaari"	
2016	Dhanak	"Mehandi"	
2018	Mukkabaaz	"Bahut Hua Samman"	
2018	Padmaavat	"Ghoomar"	Shreya Ghoshal
2019	Pehlwaan D	"Jai Ho Pehlwaan"	
2019	Motichoor Chaknachoor	"Crazy Lagdi"	
2019	Kanpuriye		
2019	Avane Srimannarayana (Hindi Dub)		
2020	Pareeksha		
2020	Choked		
2020	Sab Kushal Mangal		
2022	777 Charlie (Hindi Dub)		
2023	Bholaa	"Pan Dukaniya"	Kanika Kapoor
2024	Ae Watan Mere Watan	"Dua-E-Azadi"	Javed Ali

=== Kannada songs ===
Year	Film	Song	Co-Singer(s)
2016	Mungaru Male 2	"Onte Songu"	Armaan Malik, Shreya Ghoshal
2024	Somu Sound Engineer	"Soma Soma"	
TBA	Koragajja	"Tellanti Tellanti / Gilori Gilori"	Anila Rajeev, Sharon Prabhakar
