= Shivam Pathak =

Indian singer and songwriter

Shivam Pathak is an Indian singer and songwriter. He participated in Indian Idol season 5 and he was in the top 5.

== Early life and career ==
Pathak is from Lakhimpur (Kheri) Uttar Pradesh (Lucknow). He moved to Mumbai in 2008, to pursue a hardware and networking course. After completion, he was looking for a job, and a friend suggested he try his luck at music reality shows as he had a good voice. He participated in Indian Idol 5, as one of Top-5 selected finalists, but did not make the final three. He studied music under Suresh Wadkar for two years.

== Discography ==
Song list filmography recorded by Shivam Pathak
Year	Film	Song	Composer(s)	Writer(s)	Co-artist(s)	Notes
2011	Mod	"Tu Hi Tu"	Tapas Relia	Mir Ali Husain	Shreya Ghoshal	
2011	Mod	"Ai Meri Jaaniya"	Tapas Relia	Mir Ali Husain	Solo	
2013	Satyagraha	"Satyagraha"	Salim-Sulaiman	Prasoon Joshi	Rajiv Sundaresan & Shweta Pandit	
2014	Mary Kom	"Sukoon Mila"	Shivam Pathak	Lt. Sandeep Singh	Arijit Singh	
2014	Mary Kom	"Salaam India"	Shivam Pathak	Lt. Sandeep Singh	Vishal Dadlani, Salim Merchant	
2016	Sarbjit	"Nindiya"	Shivam Pathak, Shashi		Arijit Singh	
2016	Gandhigiri	"KA KHA"	Shivam Pathak	Lt. Chandresh Singh Pagal		
2016	Gandhigiri	"Yaara Ve"	Shivam Pathak	Lt. Chandresh Singh Pagal		
2018	Padmaavat	"Ek Dil Ek Jaan"	Sanjay Leela Bhansali	A. M. Turaz	Solo	
2018	Padmaavat	"Khali Bali"	Sanjay Leela Bhansali	A. M. Turaz	Shail Hada	

== Awards and nominations ==
Award	Category	Nominated work	Result	Ref.
7th Mirchi Music Awards	Upcoming Music Composer of The Year	"Sukoon Mila" from Mary Kom	Nominated	
