= Ae Watan =

Indian film song

Single by Arijit Singh, Sunidhi Chauhan

from the album Raazi
- Language: Hindi
- Released: 2018
- Genre: Patriotic
- Length: 3:43 (male version); 3:31 (female version)
- Label: Zee Music Company
- Composer(s): Shankar–Ehsaan–Loy
- Lyricist(s): Gulzar

Raazi track listing
- 1. "'Ae Watan"; 2. "Dilbaro"; 3. "Raazi"

Music video
- "Ae Watan" on YouTube

Ae Watan (transl. Oh Homeland) is an Indian patriotic Hindi song from the soundtrack of the 2018 Bollywood film Raazi. The song is sung by Arijit Singh and Sunidhi Chauhan. Shankar–Ehsaan–Loy composed the music, and the lyrics are by Gulzar and Allama Iqbal. The music video for the song stars Sehmat Khan (played by Alia Bhatt).

The song was praised for "delivering patriotism" by multiple critics. Gulzar has expressed his belief that "Ae Watan" should become "the song of our nation". The song won the IIFA Award for Playback Singer (Male and Female) at the 2019 International Indian Film Academy Awards.

== Development ==
Both "Ae Watan" and "Dilbaro" serve as the title tracks for the film. Ehsaan Noorani of the musical trio Shankar–Ehsaan–Loy described the song as being "crucial to the story". Shankar Mahadevan of the same trio, talking about the song, told The Times of India,

'Ae Watan' started with lyrics. He [Gulzar] had written it, and we just picked it up and started singing it. The song dictated the melody, it was an organic process. All songs of 'Raazi' have been made like that.

Lyricist Gulzar has said he wants the song to become "the song of our nation". In an interview with The Times of India, Gulzar explains: "It speaks for all of us and it speaks without any prejudice. People keep asking what nationalism is all about. Well, one can define nationalism through this song". Gulzar later stated that the song is a tribute to the poet Muhammad Iqbal.

== Music video ==
The music video features actress Alia Bhatt as Sehmat Khan, explaining why she choose to become a spy for India.

== Reception ==
=== Critical response ===
Writing for The Hindu, Vipin Nair praised the song, calling it the first "patriotic song to have come out of Bollywood in a long time". Firstpost, an Indian news and media website, wrote: "'Ae Watan' celebrates the true spirit of patriotism – where one places one's motherland before anything, even oneself". Sankhayan Ghosh of the Film Companion expressed that the song "stands out for its simplicity, and context". He further added "Ae Watan appeals to the hardened cynics from both sides of the ideological centre; it reminds us that patriotism isn't necessarily a bad thing, all the while showing the price we pay for it". Priyanka Vartak of The Free Press Journal wrote that: "[Arijit Singh] his soulful voice will surely give you goosebumps".

=== Popular reception ===
Ehsaan Noorani commented that people upload "at least two-three cover versions" of the song via social media platforms. He further added that the song has "achieved a different level of popularity" and he has never "seen reactions" like this before.

=== Chart performance ===
Chart (2018)	Peak position	Ref.
The Times of India Mirchi Top 20 Chart	10	

== Accolades ==
Year	Award	Recipient	Result	Ref.
2019	IIFA Award for Best Lyricist	Gulzar	Nominated	
2019	IIFA Award for Best Female Playback Singer	Harshdeep Kaur; Vibha Saraf	Won	
2019	IIFA Award for Best Male Playback Singer	Arijit Singh	Won	
2019	Mirchi Music Award for Male Vocalist of The Year	Arijit Singh	Nominated	
2019	Mirchi Music Awards for Critics' Choice Lyricist of The Year	Gulzar	Nominated	
2019	Mirchi Music Awards for Critics' Choice Song of The Year	Shankar-Ehsaan-Loy	Nominated	

== See also ==
- "Sare Jahan se Accha", patriotic Urdu poem by Allama Iqbal
