= 25th Screen Awards =

Indian film awards ceremony in 2018

- Date: 16 December 2018
- Site: Mumbai, India
- Hosted by: Vicky Kaushal; Karan Johar; Shahid Kapoor
- Produced by: Cineyug
- Official website: 25th Screen Awards

Highlights
- Best Film: Stree
- Best Direction: Sriram Raghavan (Andhadhun)
- Best Actor: Rajkummar Rao and Ranveer Singh (Stree and Padmaavat)
- Best Actress: Alia Bhatt (Raazi)
- Most awards: Raazi (6)
- Most nominations: Raazi (11)

Television coverage
- Network: Star Plus

The 25th Star Screen Awards ceremony honoured the best Indian Hindi-language films of 2018. The ceremony was held on 27 December 2018 and broadcast in India on Star Plus on 31 December 2018. Actors Vicky Kaushal, Shahid Kapoor and Karan Johar hosted the event. Additionally, Shah Rukh Khan introduced and concluded the awards ceremony.

Raazi led the ceremony with 11 nominations, followed by Andhadhun with 9 nominations and Badhaai Ho, Padmaavat and Stree with 7 nominations each.

Raazi won 6 awards, including Best Actress (for Alia Bhatt), thus becoming the most-awarded film at the ceremony.

== Winners and nominees ==
Winners are listed first and highlighted in boldface.

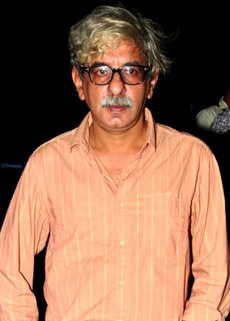
Sriram Raghavan — Best Director (Andhadhun)

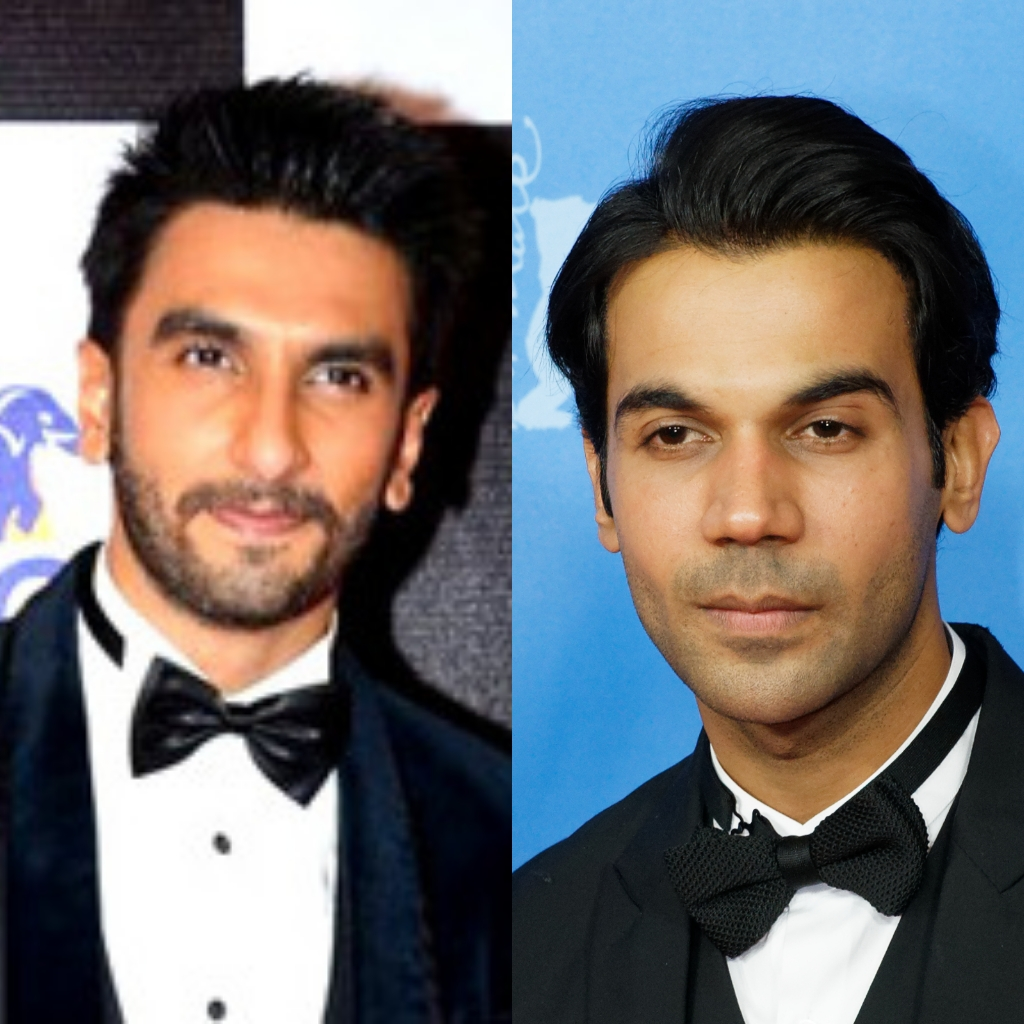
Ranveer Singh and Rajkummar Rao— Best Actor (Padmaavat & Stree)

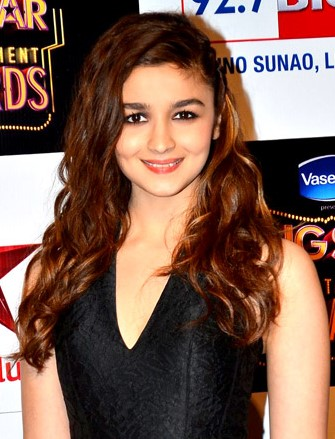
Alia Bhatt — Best Actress (Raazi)

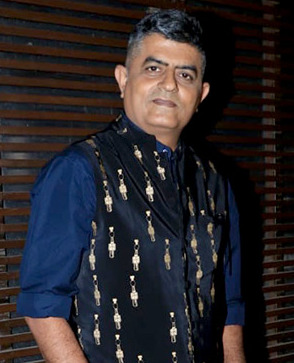
Gajraj Rao — Best Actor - Critics (Badhaai Ho)

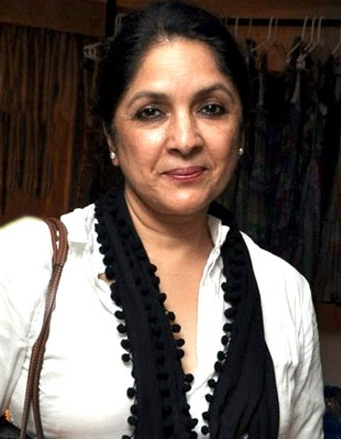
Neena Gupta — Best Actress - Critics (Badhaai Ho)

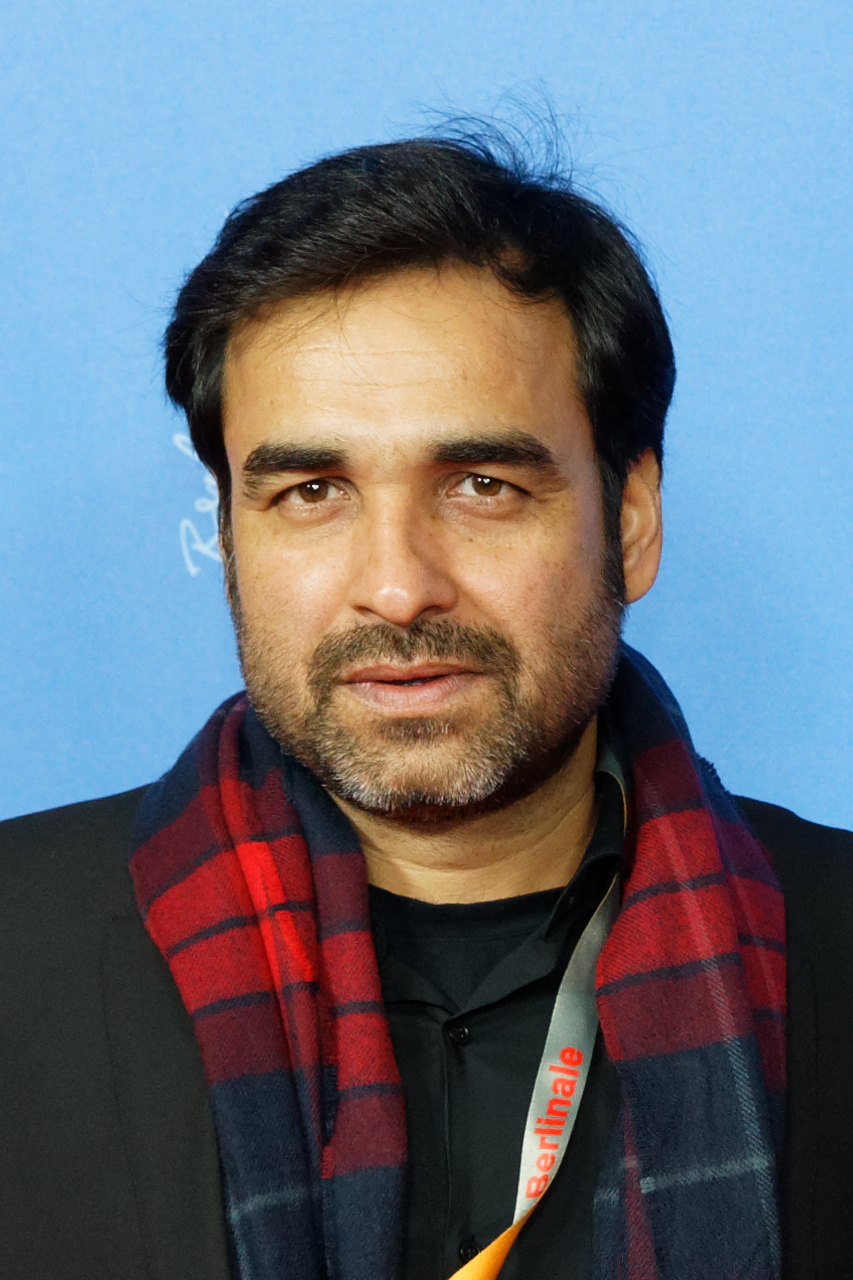
Pankaj Tripathi — Best Supporting Actor (Stree)

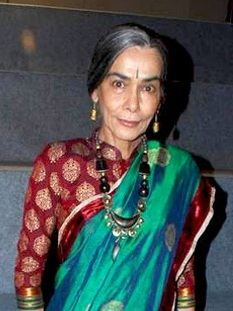
Surekha Sikri — Best Supporting Actress (Badhaai Ho)

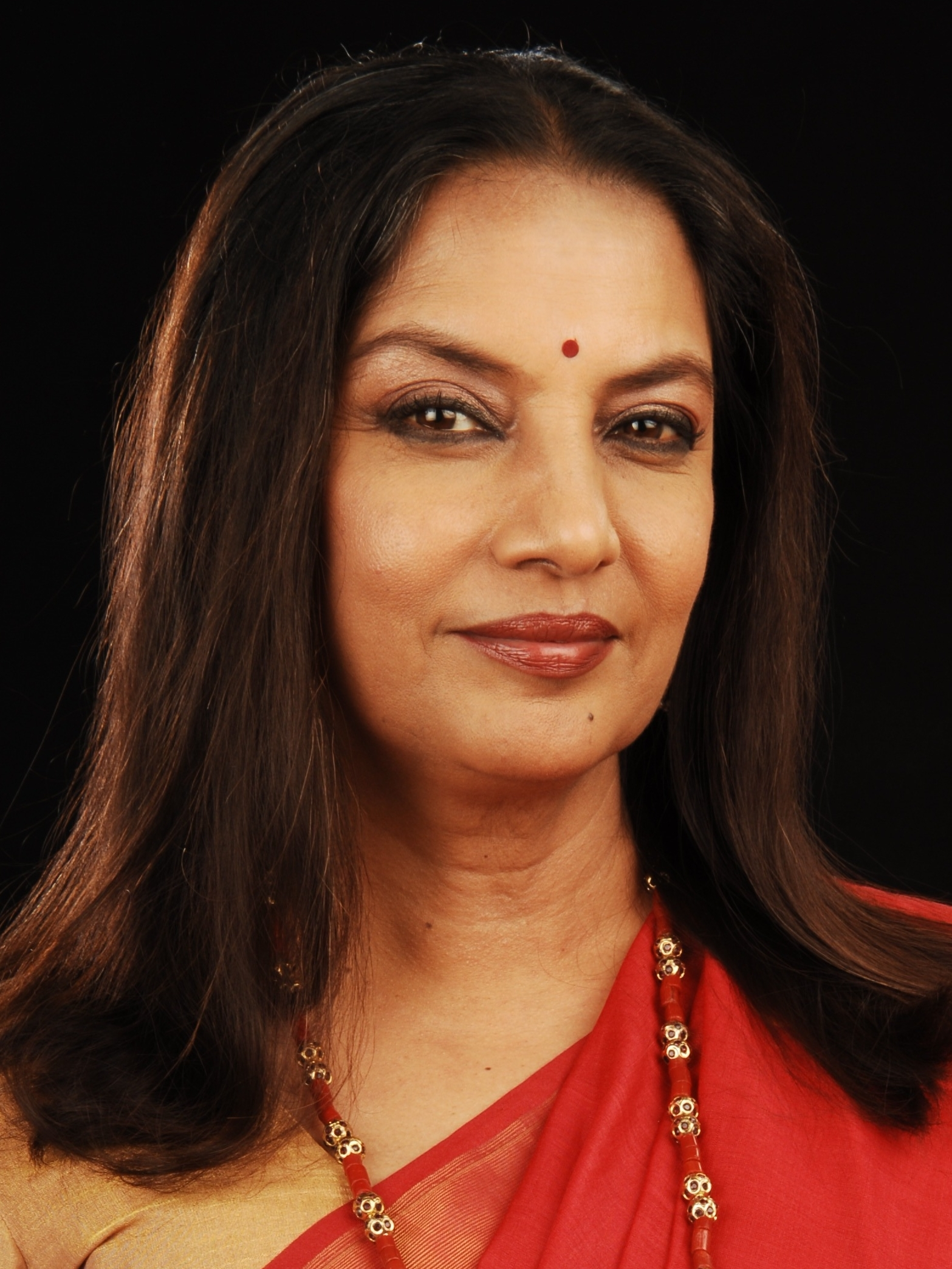
Shabana Azmi — Lifetime Achievement Awardee

=== Main awards ===
Best Film	Best Director
**Stree – Dinesh Vijan, Raj Nidimoru and Krishna D.K.**; Andhadhun – Sanjay Routray, Ajit Andhare and Sudhanshu Vats; Badhaai Ho – Vineet Jain, Hemant Bhandari and Amit Sharma; Mulk – Deepak Mukut and Anubhav Sinha; Padmaavat – Sanjay Leela Bhansali, Sudhanshu Vats and Ajit Andhare; Raazi – Vineet Jain, Karan Johar, Hiroo Yash Johar and Apoorva Mehta; Sanju – Vidhu Vinod Chopra and Rajkumar Hirani	**Sriram Raghavan – Andhadhun**; Amar Kaushik – Stree; Amit Sharma – Badhaai Ho; Anubhav Sinha – Mulk; Meghna Gulzar – Raazi; Rajkumar Hirani – Sanju; Sanjay Leela Bhansali – Padmaavat
Best Actor	Best Actress
**Rajkummar Rao – Stree as Vicky**; **Ranveer Singh – Padmaavat as Alauddin Khilji**; Ayushmann Khurrana – Andhadhun as Akash; Ayushmann Khurrana – Badhaai Ho as Nakul Kaushik; Gajraj Rao – Badhaai Ho as Jeetender Kaushik; Ranbir Kapoor – Sanju as Sanjay Dutt; Vicky Kaushal – Manmarziyaan as Vicky Sandhu	**Alia Bhatt – Raazi as Sehmat Khan**; Deepika Padukone – Padmaavat as Padmavati; Rani Mukerji – Hichki as Naina Mathur; Taapsee Pannu – Manmarziyaan as Rumi Bagga; Tabu – Andhadhun as Simi
Best Supporting Actor	Best Supporting Actress
**Pankaj Tripathi – Stree as Rudra**; Abhishek Bachchan – Manmarziyaan as Robbie Bhatia; Jaideep Ahlawat – Raazi as Khalid Mir; Saurabh Shukla – Raid as Rameshwar Singh; Sunny Kaushal – Gold as Himmat Singh; Vicky Kaushal – Raazi as Iqbal Syed; Vicky Kaushal – Sanju as Kamlesh Kanhaiyalal Kapasi	**Surekha Sikri – Badhaai Ho as Dadi**; Divya Dutta – Blackmail as Dolly Verma; Pushpa Joshi – Raid as Amma Ji; Radhika Apte – Andhadhun as Sophie; Rasika Dugal – Manto as Safia; Swara Bhaskar – Veere Di Wedding as Sakshi Soni
Most Promising Newcomer – Male	Most Promising Newcomer – Female
**Ishaan Khatter – Beyond the Clouds as Amir & Dhadak as Madhukar Bhagla**; Abhishek Bannerjee – Stree as Jaana	**Radhika Madan – Pataakha as Champa Kumari**; Janhvi Kapoor – Dhadak as Parthavi Singh; Zoya Hussain – Mukkabaaz as Sunaina Mishra
Most Promising Debut Director	Best Child Artiste
**Amar Kaushik – Stree**; Adesh Prasad and Rahi Anil Barve – Tumbbad; Akarsh Khurana – Karwaan; Dipesh Jain – Gali Guleiyan; Prosit Roy – Pari	**Mohammad Samad – Tumbbad as Pandurang**; **Dhundiraj Prabhakar Jogalekar – Tumbbad as Young Vinayak**

=== Critics' awards ===
Best Film
**Mulk – Deepak Mukut and Anubhav Sinha**; October – Shoojit Sircar, Ronnie Lahiri and Sheel Kumar; Pari – Anushka Sharma and Karnesh Sharma; Pataakha – Vishal Bhardwaj, Rekha Bhardwaj, Dheeraj Wadhawan, Ajay Kapoor and Ishan Saksena; Tumbbad – Sohum Shah, Aanand L. Rai, Mukesh Shah and Amita Shah
Best Actor	Best Actress
**Gajraj Rao – Badhaai Ho as Jeetender Kaushik**; Ishaan Khatter – Beyond the Clouds as Amir; Rajkummar Rao – Omerta as Ahmed Omar Saeed Sheikh; Rishi Kapoor – Mulk as Murad Ali Mohammed; Varun Dhawan – October as Danish Walia; Vineet Kumar Singh – Mukkabaaz as Shravan Kumar Singh	**Neena Gupta – Badhaai Ho as Priyamvada Kaushik**; Anushka Sharma – Pari as Rukhsana; Malavika Mohanan – Beyond the Clouds as Tara; Sanya Malhotra – Pataakha as Genda Kumari; Taapsee Pannu – Mulk as Aarti Malhotra

=== Special awards ===
Lifetime Achievement Award	Star Plus Baat Nayi Award
**Sridevi**	**Thugs of Hindostan**
Best Ethnic Style – Male	Best Ethnic Style – Female
**Shah Rukh Khan**	**Mrunal Thakur**
Real Star Award – Male	Real Star Award – Female
**Sushant Singh Rajput**	**Katrina Kaif**

=== Technical Awards ===
Best Music
**Amit Trivedi – Manmarziyaan**; Ajay–Atul – Dhadak; Amaal Mallik, Guru Randhawa, Rochak Kohli, Saurabh–Vaibhav, Yo Yo Honey Singh and Zack Knight – Sonu Ke Titu Ki Sweety; Qaran, Shashwat Sachdev, Vishal Mishra and White Noise – Veere Di Wedding; Shankar–Ehsaan–Loy – Raazi; Vishal–Shekhar – Tiger Zinda Hai
Best Playback Singer – Male	Best Playback Singer – Female
**Arijit Singh – "Ae Watan" (Raazi)**; Amit Trivedi – "Naina Da Kya Kasoor" (Andhadhun); Ammy Virk and Shahid Mallya – "Daryaa" (Manmarziyaan); Atif Aslam – "Dil Diyan Gallan" (Tiger Zinda Hai); Diljit Dosanjh – "Ishq Di Baajiyaan" (Soorma)	**Harshdeep Kaur – "Conch Ladhiyaan" (Manmarziyaan) & "Dilbaro" (Raazi)**; Sunidhi Chauhan – "Lae Dooba" (Aiyaary); Jonita Gandhi – "Sacchi Mohabbat" (Manmarziyaan); Shreya Ghoshal – "Ghoomar" (Padmaavat); Ronkini Gupta – "Chaav Laaga" (Sui Dhaaga); Neha Kakkar and Dhvani Bhanushali – "Dilbar" (Satyameva Jayate)
Best Lyrics	Best Sound Design
**Gulzar – "Ae Watan" (Raazi)**	**Madhu Apsara – Andhadhun**
Best Film Writing (Story and Screenplay)	Best Dialogue
**Sriram Raghavan, Pooja Ladha Surti, Hemanth Rao, Arijit Biswas and Yogesh Chandekar – Andhadhun**	**Sumit Arora – Stree**
Best Editing	Best Cinematography
**Pooja Ladha Surti – Andhadhun**	**Pankaj Kumar – Tumbbad**
Best Costume Design	Best Production Design
**Ajay Kumar, Chandrakan Sonawane, Harpreet Narula, Pimple Narula and Maxima Basu – Padmaavat**	**Amit Ray and Subrata Chakraborty – Raazi**
Best Action	Best Choreography
**Ahmed Khan – Baaghi 2**	**Jyothi D. Tomar and Kruti Mahesh – "Ghoomar" (Padmaavat)**

=== Films with multiple nominations and awards ===
Films that received multiple nominations
Nominations	Film
11	Raazi
9	Andhadhun
7	Badhaai Ho
7	Padmaavat
7	Stree
6	Manmarziyaan
5	Mulk
5	Tumbbad
4	Dhadak
4	Sanju
3	Beyond the Clouds
3	Pari
3	Pataakha
2	Gold
2	Mukkabaaz
2	October
2	Raid
2	Tiger Zinda Hai
2	Veere Di Wedding

Films that received multiple awards
Wins	Film
6	Raazi
5	Stree
4	Andhadhun
3	Badhaai Ho
3	Padmaavat
3	Tumbbad
2	Dhadak
2	Manmarziyaan

== Performers and presenters ==
The following individuals performed musical numbers or presented awards.

=== Performers ===
Name(s)	Performed
Nora Fatehi	"Dilbar" (Satyameva Jayate) "Manohari" (Baahubali: The Beginning)
Shraddha Kapoor	"Aao Kabhi Haveli Pe" (Stree) "Kamariya" (Stree) "Milegi Milegi" (Stree)
Tiger Shroff	"Urvashi" (Yo Yo Honey Singh) "Mundiyan" (Baaghi 2) "O Saathi" (Baaghi 2) "High Rated Gabru" (Nawabzaade)
Katrina Kaif	"Suraiyya" (Thugs of Hindostan) "Manzoor-e-Khuda" (Thugs of Hindostan) "Husn Parcham" (Zero)
Alia Bhatt	"Let's Nacho" (Kapoor & Sons)
Jacqueline Fernandez	"Aa Zara" (Murder 2) "Buzz" (Badshah) "Yaar Na Miley" (Kick) "Heeriye" (Race 3)
Aayush Sharma; Mouni Roy	"Rangtaari" (Loveyatri) (Solo) "Chhote Chhote Peg" (Sonu Ke Titu Ki Sweety) (Solo) "Chogada" (Loveyatri) "Akh Lad Jaave" (Loveyatri)

=== Presenters ===
Name(s)	Presented
Radhika Chhabria; Ashwiny Iyer Tiwari; Sunny Kaushal	Screen Award for Most Promising Debut Director
Anupriya Goenka; Karan Shroff	Screen Award for Most Promising Newcomer - Male; Screen Award for Most Promising Newcomer - Female
Naveen Kapoor; Daisy Shah	Screen Award for Best Child Artiste
Kabir Khan	Screen Award for Best Supporting Actor
Ambrish Jain; Kabir Khan	Real Star Award - Male
Sonal Chauhan; Malavika Mohanan	Screen Award for Best Supporting Actress
Shyam Benegal; Urmila Matondkar	Screen Lifetime Achievement Award
Rajkummar Rao	Star Plus Baat Nayi Award
Kartik Aaryan; Ishita Raj; Nushrratt Bharuccha	Screen Award for Best Ethnic Style - Male; Screen Award for Best Ethnic Style - Male
Nushrat Barucha; Ambrish Jain; Aayush Sharma	Real Star Award - Female
Neena Gupta; Diana Penty	Screen Award for Best Film (Critics); Screen Award for Best Film
Ramesh Sippy	Screen Award for Best Director
Sriram Raghavan; Mouni Roy	Screen Award for Best Actor (Critics); Screen Award for Best Actress (Critics)
Rekha; Balesh Sharma	Screen Award for Best Actor
Rekha	Screen Award for Best Actress
Neetu Chandra; Meghna Gulzar	Screen Award for Best Sound Design; Screen Award for Best Costume Design; Screen Award for Best Production Design
Rasika Duggal; Raja Krishna Menon	Screen Award for Best Editing; Screen Award for Best Cinematography; Screen Award for Best Action
Jaideep Ahlawat; Ashwini Iyer Tiwari	Screen Award for Best Film Writing (Story and Screenplay); Best Dialogue; Screen Award for Best Choreography
Divya Dutta; Radhika Madhan	Screen Award for Best Lyricist
Divya Ghosla Kumar; Bhushan Kumar	Screen Award for Best Music
Ramesh Taurani Taapsee Pannu Badshah|| Screen Award for Best Male Playback; Screen Award for Best Female Playback
