= List of Hindi films of 2018 =

This is a list of (Indian Hindi-language) films that have been released in 2018.

== Box office collection ==
The Highest-grossing Bollywood films released in 2018, by worldwide box office gross revenue, are as follows.

Highest worldwide gross of 2018
Rank	Title	Production company	Distributor	Worldwide gross	Ref.
1	Sanju	Vinod Chopra Films; Rajkumar Hirani Films	Fox Star Studios	₹586.85 crore (US$85.81 million)	
2	Padmaavat	Bhansali Productions	Viacom18 Studios	₹571.98 crore (US$83.64 million)	
3	Andhadhun	Matchbox Pictures	Viacom18 Studios	₹456.89 crore (US$66.81 million)	
4	Simmba	Dharma Productions; Rohit Shetty Picturez	Reliance Entertainment	₹400.19 crore (US$58.52 million)	
5	Thugs of Hindostan	Yash Raj Films		₹335 crore (US$48.98 million)	
6	Race 3	Salman Khan Films	Tips Films	₹303 crore (US$44.31 million)	
7	Baaghi 2	Nadiadwala Grandson Entertainment	Fox Star Studios	₹254.33 crore (US$37.19 million)	
8	Hichki	Yash Raj Films		₹239.79 crore (US$35.06 million)	
9	Badhaai Ho	Junglee Pictures; Chrome Pictures	AA Films	₹221.44 crore (US$32.38 million)	
10	Pad Man	Mrs. Funnybones Movies; Columbia Pictures; KriArj Entertainment; Cape of Good Films; Hope Productions	Sony Pictures Releasing	₹212.02 crore (US$31 million)	(Note: Pad Man worldwide gross: India – ₹104.9 crore; China – ₹66.91 crore; Japan – ₹4.8 crore; Other territories – $4.78 million (₹46.18 crore))

== January–March ==
Opening		Title	Director	Cast	Production house	Ref.
J A N	12	1921	Vikram Bhatt	Zareen Khan, Karan Kundra, Tobby Hinston, Sonia Armstrong	Reliance Entertainment, LoneRanger Productions, Motion Picture Capital, Uniseller Production	
J A N	12	Kaalakaandi	Akshat Verma	Saif Ali Khan, Isha Talwar, Shenaz Treasury, Akshay Oberoi, Vijay Raaz, Deepak Dobriyal, Sobhita Dhulipala, Kunaal Roy Kapur, Nary Singh	Cinestaan Film Company, Flying Unicorn Entertainment, Immoral Police	
J A N	12	Mukkabaaz	Anurag Kashyap	Vineet Kumar Singh, Zoya Hussain, Ravi Kishan, Jimmy Sheirgill	Eros International, Colour Yellow Productions	
J A N	15	Phir Se...	Kunal Kohli	Jennifer Winget, Kunal Kohli, Rajit Kapur	Bombay Film Company	
J A N	19	My Birthday Song	Samir Soni	Sanjay Suri, Nora Fatehi, Pitobash	Kahwa entertainment	
J A N	19	Vodka Diaries	Kushal Srivastava	Kay Kay Menon, Mandira Bedi, Raima Sen, Sharib Hashmi	K'Scope Entertainment Pvt Ltd & Vishalraj Films & Production Pvt Ltd	
J A N	19	Nirdosh	Pradeep Rangwani	Arbaaz Khan, Manjari Fadnis, Ashmit Patel, Mukul Dev, Mahek Chahal	UV Films	
J A N	19	Union Leader	Sanjay Patel	Rahul Bhat, Tillotama Shome	Dim Light Pictures	
J A N	25	Padmaavat	Sanjay Leela Bhansali	Shahid Kapoor, Deepika Padukone, Ranveer Singh, Aditi Rao Hydari	Paramount Pictures, Viacom 18 Motion Pictures, Bhansali Productions	
F E B	9	Pad Man	R. Balki	Akshay Kumar, Sonam Kapoor, Radhika Apte	Mrs Funnybones Movies, Columbia Pictures, KriArj Entertainment, Cape of Good Films, Hope Productions	
F E B	14	Love per Square Foot	Anand Tiwari	Vicky Kaushal, Angira Dhar, Alankrita Sahai, Raghubir Yadav	RSVP Movies, Netflix	
F E B	16	Aiyaary	Neeraj Pandey	Sidharth Malhotra, Manoj Bajpayee, Rakul Preet Singh, Pooja Chopra, Anupam Kher, Naseeruddin Shah	Plan C Studios, Reliance Entertainment, Pen Studios, Motion Picture Capital, Friday Filmworks	
F E B	16	Kuchh Bheege Alfaaz	Onir	Zain Khan Durrani, Geetanjali Thapa	Yoodlee Films	
F E B	16	Jaane Kyun De Yaaron	Akshay Anand	Raghu Raja, Abhishek Sharma, Kabir Bedi, Chetna Pande, Viju Khote	NeelRishiFilms, Theatre King	
F E B	23	Sonu Ke Titu Ki Sweety	Luv Ranjan	Kartik Aaryan, Nushrat Bharucha, Sunny Nijar	T-Series Films, Luv Films	
M A R	2	Pari	Prosit Roy	Anushka Sharma, Parambrata Chatterjee, Rajat Kapoor, Ritabhari Chakraborty, Mansi Multani	Clean Slate Films, KriArj Entertainment, Kyta Productions	
M A R	2	Veerey Ki Wedding	Ashu Trikha	Pulkit Samrat, Jimmy Sheirgill, Kriti Kharbanda, Satish Kaushik, Yuvika Chaudhary, Supriya Karnik	Panorama Studios	
M A R	9	Hate Story IV	Vishal Pandya	Urvashi Rautela, Vivan Bhatena, Karan Wahi, Ihana Dhillon, Gulshan Grover, Tia Bajpai, Shaad Randhawa	T-Series Films	
M A R	9	Dil Juunglee	Aleya Sen	Saqib Saleem, Tapsee Pannu, Abhilash Thapleyal, Nidhi Singh, Srishti Srivastava, Ayesha Khaduskar	Pooja Entertainment	
M A R	9	3 Storeys	Arjun Mukerjee	Richa Chaddha, Pulkit Samrat, Sharman Joshi, Renuka Shahane, Masumeh Makhija, Laksh Singh, Aisha Ahmed, Ankit Rathi	B4U Motion Pictures, Excel Entertainment, Open Air Films	
M A R	16	Raid	Raj Kumar Gupta	Ajay Devgn, Ileana D'Cruz, Saurabh Shukla	T-Series Films, Panorama Studios	
M A R	23	Hichki	Siddharth P Malhotra	Rani Mukerji	Yash Raj Films	
M A R	23	Shaadi Teri Bajayenge Hum Band	Gurpreet Sondh	Rajpal Yadav, Mushtaq Khan, Rahul Bagga, Rohit Kumar, Dilbagh Singh, Naresh Gosain, Afreen Alvi, Radha Bhatt	Rangrezaa Films	
M A R	30	Baaghi 2	Ahmed Khan	Tiger Shroff, Disha Patani, Manoj Bajpayee, Randeep Hooda, Prateik Babbar	Fox Star Studios, Nadiadwala Grandson Entertainment	

== April–June ==
Opening		Title	Director	Cast	Production house	Ref.
A P R	6	Blackmail	Abhinay Deo	Irrfan Khan, Kirti Kulhari, Arunoday Singh, Divya Dutta, Omi Vaidya	T-Series Films, RDP Motion Pictures	
A P R	6	Missing	Mukul Abhyankar	Tabu, Manoj Bajpayee, Annu Kapoor	Anand Pandit Motion Pictures, Sri Adhikari Brothers, Friday Filmworks, Abundantia Entertainment	
A P R	13	October	Shoojit Sircar	Varun Dhawan, Banita Sandhu, Gitanjali Rao	Rising Sun Films, Kino Works	
A P R	13	Mercury	Karthik Subbaraj	Prabhu Deva, Sananth Reddy, Remya Nambeesan	Pen Studios, Stone Bench Films	
A P R	13	Zoo	Shlok Sharma	Shweta Tripathi, Shashank Arora, Rahul Kumar	Bahadur Films	
A P R	20	Beyond the Clouds	Majid Majidi	Ishaan Khatter, Malavika Mohanan	Zee Studios, Namah Pictures	
A P R	20	Nanu Ki Jaanu	Faraz Haider	Patralekhaa, Abhay Deol, Sapna Chaudhary	Inbox Pictures	
A P R	27	Daas Dev	Sudhir Mishra	Richa Chaddha, Aditi Rao Hydari, Rahul Bhat, Saurabh Shukla, Vipin Sharma, Vineet Kumar Singh, Dalip Tahil, Anurag Kashyap	Saptrishi Cinevision, Storm Motion Pictures	
A P R	27	Meri Nimmo	M.M Shanklya	Anjali Patil, Karan Dave	Eros International, Colour Yellow Productions	
M A Y	4	102 Not Out	Umesh Shukla	Amitabh Bachchan, Rishi Kapoor	Sony Pictures India, Treetop Entertainment, Benchmark Pictures	
M A Y	4	Omerta	Hansal Mehta	Rajkummar Rao	Swiss Entertainment, Karma Features	
M A Y	11	Raazi	Meghna Gulzar	Vicky Kaushal, Alia Bhatt	Junglee Pictures, Dharma Productions	
M A Y	11	Hope Aur Hum	Sudip Bandyopadhyay	Naseeruddin Shah, Sonali Kulkarni, Aamir Bashir	PVR Pictures, Thumbnail Pictures	
M A Y	11	Falooda	Dhiraj Singh	Aarav Negi, Goonj Chand, Azhar, Pihu Sharma, Dhiraj Singh	Vaibav laxmi Films, Shree S.J Entertainment, Dev Gayatri Entertainment	
M A Y	18	High Jack	Akash Khurana	Sumeet Vyas, Sonnalli Seygall, Mantra, Taaruk Raina, Priyanshu Painyuli, Kumud Mishra, Natasha Rastogi	Phantom Films, Viu	
M A Y	18	Khajoor Pe Atke	Harsh Chhaya	Vinay Pathak, Manoj Pahwa, Seema Pahwa, Dolly Ahluwalia, Sabah Kapoor	Welcome Friends Production	
M A Y	25	Parmanu: The Story Of Pokhran	Abhishek Sharma	John Abraham, Diana Penty, Boman Irani	Zee Studios, Kyta Productions, Pooja Entertainment, JA Entertainment	
M A Y	25	Bioscopewala	Deb Medhekar	Danny Denzongpa, Geetanjali Thapa, Tisca Chopra, Adil Hussain	Fox Star Studios	
J U N	1	Veere Di Wedding	Shashanka Ghosh	Kareena Kapoor, Sonam Kapoor, Swara Bhaskar, Shikha Talsania, Sumeet Vyas	Balaji Motion Pictures, Anil Kapoor Film & Communication Network, Saffron Broadcast & Media	
J U N	1	Bhavesh Joshi Superhero	Vikramaditya Motwane	Harshvardhan Kapoor, Priyanshu Painyuli, Nishikant Kamat	Eros International, Phantom Films	
J U N	1	Phamous	Karan Lalit Butani	Jackie Shroff, Jimmy Sheirgill, Kay Kay Menon, Shriya Saran, Mahie Gill, Pankaj Tripathi	Vidisha Productions Pvt. Ltd.	
J U N	15	Race 3	Remo D'Souza	Anil Kapoor, Bobby Deol, Daisy Shah, Freddy Daruwala, Jacqueline Fernandez, Salman Khan, Saqib Saleem	Salman Khan Films, Tips Industries	
J U N	15	Lust Stories	Anurag Kashyap, Karan Johar, Zoya Akhtar, Dibakar Banerjee	Radhika Apte, Sanjay Kapoor, Kiara Advani, Vicky Kaushal, Neha Dhupia, Neil Bhoopalam, Bhumi Pednekar, Manisha Koirala, Akash Thosar	RSVP Movies, Flying Unicorn Entertainment, Excel Entertainment, Monsoon Media & Entertainment, Dharma Productions, Netflix	
J U N	29	Sanju	Rajkumar Hirani	Ranbir Kapoor	Fox Star Studios, Vinod Chopra Films, Rajkumar Hirani Films	

== July–September ==
Opening		Title	Director	Cast	Production house	Ref.
J U L	6	Hanuman vs Mahiravana	Ezhil Vendan		Green Gold Animations	
J U L	13	Soorma	Shaad Ali	Diljit Dosanjh, Taapsee Pannu, Angad Bedi	Sony Pictures Networks Productions, CS Films	
J U L	20	When Obama Loved Osama	Sudhish Kumar Sharma	Mousam Sharma, Swati Bakshi, Rahul Avana, Mohit Baghel, Heena Panchal, Hemant Pandey, Vikas Giri Manoj Bakshi, Himani Shivpuri,	Shape Entertainment	
J U L	20	Dhadak	Shashank Khaitan	Ishaan Khatter, Jhanvi Kapoor	Zee Studios, Dharma Productions	
J U L	27	Saheb, Biwi Aur Gangster 3	Tigmanshu Dhulia	Sanjay Dutt, Jimmy Sheirgill, Mahi Gill, Chitrangada Singh, Soha Ali Khan	Raju Chadha Films, Rahul Mittra Films, Jar Pictures, Wave Cinemas	
J U L	27	Nawabzaade	Jayesh Pradhan	Raghav Juyal, Punit Pathak, Dharmesh Yelande, Isha Rikhi	Remo D'Souza Entertainment	
A U G	3	Fanney Khan	Atul Manjrekar	Anil Kapoor, Aishwarya Rai Bachchan, Rajkummar Rao, Karan Singh Chhabra, Divya Dutta	T-Series Films, Anil Kapoor Film & Communication Network, ROMP Pictures	
A U G	3	Mulk	Anubhav Sinha	Rishi Kapoor, Prateik Babbar, Rajat Kapoor, Taapsee Pannu, Ashutosh Rana, Manoj Pahwa, Neena Gupta	Soham Rockstar Entertainment, Benaras Mediaworks	
A U G	3	Brij Mohan Amar Rahe!	Nikhil Bhatt	Arjun Mathur, Nidhi Singh, Vijayant Kohli, Sunny Hinduja	Yoodlee Films, Netflix	
A U G	3	Laxmi and Tikli Bomb	Aditya Kripalani	Vibhawari Deshpande, Suchitra Pillai, Chitraganda Chakraborty, Upendra Limaye	Mumba Devi Motion Pictures	
A U G	3	Karwaan	Akarsh Khurana	Irrfan Khan, Dulquer Salman, Mithila Palkar, Kriti Kharbanda	RSVP Movies	
A U G	15	Gold	Reema Kagti	Akshay Kumar, Kunal Kapoor, Mouni Roy, Amit Sadh	Excel Entertainment	
A U G	15	Satyameva Jayate	Milap Zaveri	John Abraham, Manoj Bajpayee, Aisha Sharma, Amruta Khanvilkar	T-Series Films, Emmay Entertainment	
A U G	24	Genius	Anil Sharma	Utkarsh Sharma, Ishita Chauhan, Nawazuddin Siddiqui, Ayesha Jhulka	Soham Rockstar Entertainment	
A U G	24	Happy Phirr Bhag Jayegi	Mudassar Aziz	Sonakshi Sinha, Diana Penty, Ali Fazal, Jimmy Shergill, Jassi Gill	Eros International, Colour Yellow Productions	
A U G	24	Toba Tek Singh	Ketan Mehta	Pankaj Kapur, Vinay Pathak	Maya Movies	
A U G	31	Yamla Pagla Deewana: Phir Se	Navaniat Singh	Dharmendra, Sunny Deol, Bobby Deol, Kriti Kharbanda	Sunny Sounds, Intercut Entertainment, Pen Studios, Soham Rockstar Entertainment	
A U G	31	Stree	Amar Kaushik	Rajkummar Rao, Shraddha Kapoor, Aparshakti Khurana, Pankaj Tripathi	Maddock Films, D2R Films, Jio Studios	
S E P	1	Once Again	Kanwal Sethi	Shefali Shah, Neeraj Kabi	Neufilm, JAR Pictures, Crawling Angel Films, Ascending Films	
S E P	7	Paltan	J. P. Dutta	Jackie Shroff, Sonu Sood, Arjun Rampal, Gurmeet Choudhary, Siddhanth Kapoor, Harshvardhan Rane, Luv Sinha, Esha Gupta, Monica Gill, Sonal Chauhan, Dipika Kakar, Aditii Arya Sharma	Zee Studios, JP Films	
S E P	7	Laila Majnu	Sajid Ali	Mir Sarwar, Avinash Tiwary, Tripti Dimri, Ruchika Kapoor	Balaji Motion Pictures, Pi Films	
S E P	7	Gali Guleiyan	Dipesh Jain	Manoj Bajpayee, Ranvir Shorey, Neeraj Kabi, Shahana Goswami	PVR Pictures	
S E P	7	Halkaa	Nila Madhab Panda	Ranvir Shorey, Paoli Dam, Tathastu, Kumud Mishra	Shiv Nadar Foundation, Akshay Parija Productions, Eleeanora Images	
S E P	14	Manmarziyaan	Anurag Kashyap	Abhishek Bachchan, Vicky Kaushal, Taapsee Pannu	Eros International, Colour Yellow Productions, Phantom Films	
S E P	14	Love Sonia	Tabrez Noorani	Mrunal Thakur, Freida Pinto, Manoj Bajpayee, Rajkummar Rao, Richa Chadda, Anupam Kher, Adil Hussain, Sai Tamhankar	Tamasha Talkies, Samraaj Talkies, India Take One Productions, Cinemantra Entertainment & Media, Dynasty Consulting Group, Prime Focus, Womark/Noorani Productions	
S E P	14	Mitron	Nitin Kakar	Jackky Bhagnani, Kritika Kamra, Pratik Gandhi, Neeraj Sood	Abundantia Entertainment	
S E P	21	Batti Gul Meter Chalu	Shree Narayan Singh	Shahid Kapoor, Shraddha Kapoor, Divyendu Sharma, Yami Gautam	T-Series Films, Krti Pictures	
S E P	21	Manto	Nandita Das	Nawazuddin Siddiqui, Tahir Raj Bhasin, Rasika Dugal, Rajshri Deshpande	HP Studios, FilmStoc, Viacom18 Motion Pictures, Nandita Das Initiatives	
S E P	21	Ishqeria	Prerna Wadhawan	Neil Nitin Mukesh, Richa Chaddha	Swarp Films & Yen Movies	
S E P	28	Sui Dhaaga	Sharat Katariya	Varun Dhawan, Anushka Sharma	Yash Raj Films	
S E P	28	Pataakha	Vishal Bhardwaj	Sanya Malhotra, Sunil Grover, Radhika Madan	Kyta Productions, B4U Motion Pictures, Vishal Bhardwaj Films	

== October–December ==
Opening		Title	Director	Cast	Production house	Ref.
O C T	5	Loveyatri	Abhiraj Minawala	Aayush Sharma, Warina Hussain	Salman Khan Films	
O C T	5	Andhadhun	Sriram Raghavan	Ayushman Khurana, Tabu, Radhika Apte	Viacom18 Motion Pictures, Matchbox Pictures	
O C T	12	Jalebi	Pushpdeep Bhardwaj	Rhea Chakraborty, Digangana Suryavanshi, Varun Mitra	Vishesh Films, Viacom18 Motion Pictures	
O C T	12	Helicopter Eela	Pradeep Sarkar	Kajol, Riddhi Sen, Neha Dhupia, Tota Roy Choudhury	Pen Studios, Ajay Devgn FFilms	
O C T	12	FryDay	Abhishek Dogra	Govinda, Varun Sharma	Inbox Pictures, PVR Pictures	
O C T	12	Tumbbad	Rahi Anil Barve	Soham Shah; Harish Khanna, Anita Date	Eros International, Soham Shah Films, Colour Yellow Productions, Film i Väst, Filmgate Films	
O C T	18	Namaste England	Vipul Shah	Arjun Kapoor, Parineeti Chopra, Aditya Seal, Alankrita Sahai, Anil Mange, Satish Kaushik	Pen Studios, Reliance Entertainment, Blockbuster Movie Entertainers	
O C T	18	Badhaai Ho	Amit Ravindernath Sharma	Ayushman Khurrana, Neena Gupta, Gajraj Rao, Surekha Sikri, Sanya Malhotra	Junglee Pictures, Chrome Pictures	
O C T	26	Baazaar	Gauravv K. Chawla	Saif Ali Khan, Radhika Apte, Chitrangada Singh, Denzil Smith, Rohan Mehra, Sonia Balani	Viacom18 Motion Pictures, Kyta Productions, B4U Motion Pictures, Emmay Entertainment	
O C T	26	5 Weddings	Namrata Singh Gujral	Rajkummar Rao, Nargis Fakhri, Bo Derek, Candy Clark, Anneliese van der Pol, Suvinder Vicky	Uniglobe Entertainment	
O C T	26	Kaashi in Search of Ganga	Dhiraj Kumar	Sharman Joshi, Aishwarya Devan, Govind Namdev, Manoj Joshi, Manoj Pahwa, Akhilendra Mishra	Insite India	
O C T	26	Dassehra	Manish Vatsalya	Neil Nitin Mukesh, Tina Desai, Govind Namdev	Rash Production	
N O V	8	Thugs of Hindostan	Vijay Krishna Acharya	Amitabh Bachchan, Aamir Khan, Fatima Sana Shaikh, Katrina Kaif, Mohammed Zeeshan Ayyub	Yash Raj Films	
N O V	16	Mohalla Assi	Chandraprakash Dwivedi	Sunny Deol, Sakshi Tanwar, Ravi Kishan, Saurabh Shukla, Mukesh Tiwari, Rajendra Gupta, Mithilesh Chaturvedi	Crossword Entertainment Pvt. Ltd.	
N O V	16	Pihu	Vinod Kapri	Myra Vishwakarma, Prerna Sharma	RSVP Movies, Roy Kapur Films	
N O V	16	Hotel Milan	Vishal Mishra	Kunaal Roy Kapur, Karishma Sharma, Zeishan Quadri, Jaideep Ahlawat, Rajesh Sharma, Zakir Hussain	AD Films	
N O V	21	Tigers	Danis Tanović	Emraan Hashmi, Khalid Abdalla, Geetanjali Thapa, Supriya Pathak	Sikhya Entertainment, A.S.A.P. Films	
N O V	23	Bhaiaji Superhit	Neerraj Pathak	Sunny Deol, Preity Zinta, Ameesha Patel, Arshad Warsi, Shreyas Talpade, Evelyn Sharma	Metro Movies	
N O V	29	2.0	S Shankar	Rajnikanth, Amy Jackson, Akshay Kumar, Adil Hussain, Sudhanshu Pandey	Dharma Productions, Lyca Productions	
N O V	30	Rajma Chawal	Leena Yadav	Rishi Kapoor, Anirudh Tanwar, Amyra Dastur	SaarthiE Entertainment, Netflix	
D E C	7	Kedarnath	Abhishek Kapoor	Sushant Singh Rajput, Sara Ali Khan	RSVP Movies, Guy in the Sky Pictures	
D E C	14	Ascharyachakit!	Samit Kakkad	Priyanka Bose, Vaibhav Raj Gupta, Ankit Raaj, Anangsha Biswas, Santosh Juvekar	Yoodlee Films, Samit Kakkad Films	
D E C	21	Zero	Aanand L. Rai	Shah Rukh Khan, Katrina Kaif, Anushka Sharma, Abhay Deol, Tigmanshu Dhulia	Red Chillies Entertainment, Colour Yellow Productions	
D E C	28	Simmba	Rohit Shetty	Ranveer Singh, Sara Ali Khan, Sonu Sood	Reliance Entertainment, Dharma Productions, Rohit Shetty Picturez	

== See also ==
- Lists of Hindi films
- List of Bollywood films of 2019
- List of Bollywood films of 2017
