= Andhagan (soundtrack) =

Soundtrack album by Santhosh Narayanan
- Released: 9 July 2023
- Recorded: December 2020–June 2023
- Studios: Future Tense Studios, Chennai
- Genre: Feature film soundtrack
- Length: 15:06
- Language: Tamil
- Label: Sony Music India
- Producer: Santhosh Narayanan

Santhosh Narayanan chronology
Kalki 2898 AD (2024)	Andhagan (2024)	Vaazhai (2024)

Singles from Andhagan
- 1. "En Kadhal" Released: 7 March 2022; 2. "Yosichi Yosichi" Released: 27 May 2022; 3. "Kannile" Released: 23 June 2023; 4. "The Andhagan Anthem" Released: 24 July 2024

Andhagan is the soundtrack album to the 2024 film of the same name directed by Thiagarajan; a remake of the Hindi film Andhadhun (2018), the film stars Prashanth, Simran and Priya Anand. The musical score and soundtrack are composed by Santhosh Narayanan with lyrics written by Vivek, Uma Devi, Vairamuthu and Ekadasi. The soundtrack was released under the Sony Music India label on 9 July 2023.

== Development ==
In December 2020, Thiagarajan announced that Santhosh Narayanan would scored the score and soundtrack. Speaking of Santhosh's inclusion, Thiagarajan said that he wanted someone who could match Amit Trivedi's work for Andhadhun and had found Santhosh to be the perfect fit, due to his versatility in multiple genres and the predominant usage of orchestral music. He also added that he was impressed by his re-recording for Cuckoo, Jigarthanda (both 2014), Kabali (2016) and Kaala (2018), that resulted in his inclusion.

Thiagarajan further wanted to experiment with the musical treatment, resulting in it being completely different from the original version. Once his involvement was confirmed, Santhosh started working on the film's music and composed the song "En Kadhal" first, for which Prashanth played keyboard. The film also featured the song "Chandirane Sooriyane" composed by Adithyan for the gangster film Amaran (1992) which starred Karthik. (Note: Karthik also made a special appearance in the film.) The audio rights were bought by Sony Music India.

== Release ==
The album was preceded by the first single "En Kadhal" released on 7 March 2022. The second single, "Yosichi Yosichi", was released on 27 May. The third single "Kannile" was released on 23 June 2023. The soundtrack was released under the Sony Music India label on 9 July 2023.

Afterwards, a promotional song "The Andhagan Anthem" was released by actor Vijay on 24 July 2024. The song featured vocals by Anirudh Ravichander and Vijay Sethupathi, and it's dance steps choreographed by Prabhu Deva. Prashanth noted that Vijay agreed to release the song after a single phone call.

== Track listing ==
Track listing
No.	Title	Lyrics	Singer(s)	Length
1.	"En Kadhal"	Vivek	Sid Sriram	4:06
2.	"Yosichi Yosichi"	Vivek	Haricharan	4:06
3.	"Chandirane Sooriyane"	Vairamuthu	P. Unnikrishnan	1:49
4.	"Kannile"	Uma Devi	Adithya RK	3:02
5.	"Yaaro Nee"	Vivek	Benny Dayal	2:00
Total length:				15:40

Extended soundtrack
No.	Title	Lyrics	Singer(s)	Length
6.	"The Andhagan Anthem"	Uma Devi, Ekadasi	Anirudh Ravichander, Vijay Sethupathi	3:24
Total length:				15:40

== Reception ==
Latha Srinivasan of Hindustan Times wrote "Music director Santhosh Narayanan is known for his spectacular songs and BGM but in Andhagan the songs are just terrible. Krish is a talented musician and plays at a bar for his livelihood but the songs he sings are tacky to say the least. This was quite unexpected from this talented music director who just gave us the massive Kalki 2898 AD." Gopinath Rajendran of The Hindu wrote "While the film's songs don't manage to stay put in our memory, the fantastic piano compositions stand apart."

== Controversies ==
After the release of "The Andhagan Anthem", Santhosh called out the record label, saying the arrangement, lyrics, music, mix and master were not what he delivered. Speaking to M. A. Fahad Hussain of The Times of India, he reiterated his claims, adding that even the music in the trailer was not his composition. He accused the label of making changes without consulting him and wanted the actual composer to be credited instead of him. Thiagarajan, when questioned by The Times about the issue, claimed ignorance and refused to comment.
