= Amit Sharma (director) =

Indian filmmaker and advertiser (born 1978)

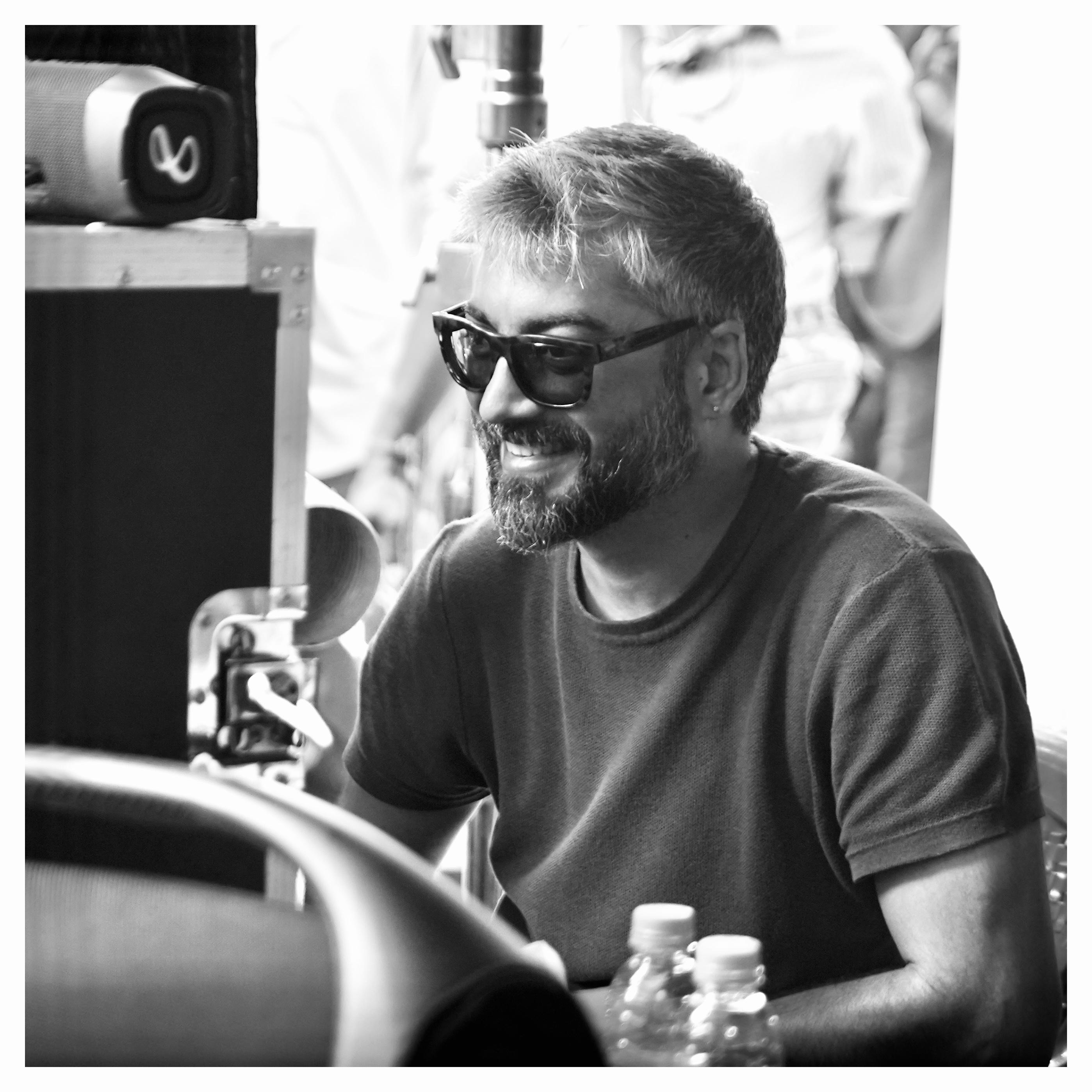
- Born: 13 April 1978 (age 48); Delhi, India
- Occupations: Director; screenwriter; producer; entrepreneur
- Years active: 1997–present

Amit Ravindernath Sharma (born 13 April 1978) is an Indian film and advertisement director and producer. In feature films, he is best known for producing and directing the 2018 National-award winning film Badhaai Ho, which was one of the highest grossing Bollywood films of 2018, having earned ₹220.34 crore ($31 million) as of December 2018.

== Biography ==
=== Early life and career ===
Sharma was born in Delhi, India, to parents who worked for the government. While still in school, he connected with film director Pradeep Sarkar, and was invited to shoot an advert in Manali. After graduating, he worked with Sarkar for six years before moving to Mumbai in 2001.

Two years later, he left the tutorship of Sarkar, and in 2004 he set up his own company, Chrome Pictures, with Aleya Sen and Hemant Bhandari. Later that year, he was offered an assistant role on Sarkar's film, Parineeta, which he turned down.

=== Advertising ===
Between 2004 and 2024, Sharma has produced and directed over 6000 advertisements, including those for Google, Coca-Cola and Amazon.

In 2011, he directed an advert entitled 'The Silent National Anthem' featured deaf and mute 'singing' the Jana Gana Mana through sign language, and won a silver award at the Cannes Lions International Festival of Creativity. A 2013 advert for Lifebuoy focused on hygiene in Indian villages, and won Gold at the Spikes Asia awards later that year.

The best-known advert he directed is perhaps the Google Reunion advert from November 2013, which told the fictional story about the reunion of two elderly men, one from India and one from Pakistan, who were childhood friends but were separated as children during the Partition of India. The ad had a strong impact in both countries, leading to hopes that travel restrictions between the two countries might be eased, and the video garnered over 1.6 million views on YouTube before debuting on television.

His work during this time was described by The Economic Times as a "contemporary greatest hits of Indian advertising".

=== Early film career and breakthrough ===
In 2014, Sharma was invited by producer Boney Kapoor to direct Tevar, a remake of the 2003 Telugu film Okkadu, starring Arjun Kapoor. The film generally received mixed reviews.

In 2016, Sharma was elected on the Cannes Lions Craft Jury.

Sharma worked as the director on Badhaai Ho, which began shooting in late 2017, and starred Ayushmann Khurrana and Neena Gupta. Sharma's production company Chrome Pictures produced the film alongside Junglee Pictures, and it was released on 18 October 2018. The film became the seventh-highest opening weekend grosser of 2018, and earned ₹220.34 crore ($31 million) worldwide. The film won the National Film Award for Best Film Popular Providing Wholesome Entertainment.

His next was an anthology film Lust Stories 2 - 'Tilchatta' starring Kajol Devgn which released on 29 June 2023 on Netflix. It became hugely popular and garnered great reviews.

Sharma's latest release, Maidaan, is about the life and career of Syed Abdul Rahim, also produced by Boney Kapoor. The filming started in 2019, but was delayed due to the pandemic. The film features music by A. R. Rahman. It released on 10 April 2024 to tremendous critical acclaim.

== Filmography ==
| Year | Title | Director | Writer | Producer | Notes |
|---|---|---|---|---|---|
| 2015 | Tevar | Yes | Yes | | |
| 2018 | Badhaai Ho | Yes | | Yes | |
| 2023 | Lust Stories 2 | Yes | Yes | | Segment: "Tilchatta" |
| 2023 | Trial Period | | | Yes | |
| 2024 | Maidaan | Yes | Yes | | |

== Awards ==
- 2011 Cannes Lions International Festival of Creativity – Silver ('The Silent National Anthem')
- 2013 Spikes Asia – Gold ('Help A Child Reach 5', for Lifebuoy)
- D&AD (Graphite & Wood for Facebook Pooja Didi)
- Spikes Asia (Dove #StopTheBeautyTest)
- Adfest (Facebook Pooja Didi)
- London International Awards (Facebook Pooja Didi & Dove #StopTheBeautyTest)
- National Film Award for Best Film Popular Providing Wholesome Entertainment - Feature film Badhaai Ho
- 70th Filmfare Awards for Best Film (Critics) - Maidaan (Nominated)
