= Fanney Khan (soundtrack) =

Soundtrack album by Amit Trivedi and Tanishk Bagchi
- Released: 13 July 2018
- Recorded: 2017–2018
- Genre: Feature film soundtrack
- Length: 29:34
- Language: Hindi
- Label: T-Series
External audio
- Official Audio Jukebox on YouTube

Amit Trivedi chronology
Bhavesh Joshi Superhero (2018)	Fanney Khan (2018)	Manmarziyaan (2018)

Tanishk Bagchi chronology
Raid (2018)	Fanney Khan (2018)	Gold (2018)

Fanney Khan is the soundtrack album to the 2018 film of the same name directed by Atul Manjrekar, starring Anil Kapoor, Aishwarya Rai Bachchan and Rajkummar Rao. The soundtrack featured eight songs composed by Amit Trivedi and Tanishk Bagchi guest composed one song for the film. It was released under the T-Series label on 13 July 2018 to mixed reviews from critics.

== Background ==
Amit Trivedi composed the film's soundtrack with lyrics written by Irshad Kamil, while Tubby–Parik produced the background score. Tanishk Bagchi served as the guest composer, remaking the Noor Jehan song "Mohabbat" from Anmol Ghadi (1946). Trivedi also recreated Mohammad Rafi's hit song "Badan Pe Sitare" from Prince (1969) and Ustad Nushrat Fateh Ali Khan's Sufi number "Halka Halka", for the film. Initially, Trivedi who refrained from recreating hit songs, had admitted do so as per Rakeysh Omprakash Mehra's request.

== Release ==
The song "Mohabbat" was first released on 11 July 2018, with a music video featuring the dance performance of Aishwarya. The second song "Halka Halka" pictured on Aishwarya and Rajkummar, was released two days later on 13 July. The third song "Achche Din" was released on 19 July. The song faced objection for its lyrics that took a dig on Prime Minister of India Narendra Modi, that resulted in the makers to release a new version "Achche Din Ab Aaya Re" on 30 July. The soundtrack was released under the T-Series label on 13 July 2018. The song "Badan Pe Sitare" was released as a bonus single under the Saregama Music label on 31 July 2018, coinciding Mohammed Rafi's death anniversary.

== Reception ==
Devarsi Ghosh of Scroll.in wrote "For a film about a pop star who is supposedly the queen of hit music, a failed crooner and an aspiring singer, the soundtrack is unremarkable. Trivedi's music sounds uninspired, which could be a result of fatigue – he has 11 releases this year. The makers should feel thankful for Bagchi's song. At least they got their party hit." Devansh Sharma of Firstpost wrote "Trivedi puts together a powerful album, with a much-needed nudge from Bagchi. The USP of the Fanney Khan album is in its powerful voices. Both Trivedi and Kamil set up an ideal platform for two of the best female vocalists in Bollywood today — Sunidhi Chauhan and Monali Thakur."

A reviewer from B4U Music USA wrote "Fanney Khan is a comparatively big film with an amazing star cast. However, the soundtrack is an average one. Mohabbat and Tere Jaisa Tu Hai are tuneful and melodious numbers." Debarati S Sen of The Times of India wrote "When you have an Amit Trivedi and Irshad Kamil helming the songs (only the first track has been composed by Tanishq Bagchi) in any album, you know it will not disappoint you. And the five-track album of 'Fanney Khan', doesn't." Joginder Tuteja of Bollywood Hungama wrote "The music of Fanney Khan turns out to be just about ordinary though one had better expectations from it, given the film's theme."

== Track listing ==
Original tracklist
No.	Title	Music	Singer(s)	Length
1.	"Mohabbat"	Tanishk Bagchi	Sunidhi Chauhan	4:03
2.	"Halka Halka"	Amit Trivedi	Sunidhi Chauhan, Divya Kumar	4:07
3.	"Achche Din"	Amit Trivedi	Amit Trivedi	4:05
4.	"Tere Jaisa Tu Hai"	Amit Trivedi	Monali Thakur	4:56
5.	"Fu Bai Fu"	Amit Trivedi	Monali Thakur	4:37
6.	"Achche Din" (New Version)	Amit Trivedi	Amit Trivedi	4:41
7.	"Halka Halka" (Unplugged)	Amit Trivedi	Neha Kakkar	3:05
Total length:				29:34

Bonus track
No.	Title	Music	Singer(s)	Length
8.	"Badan Pe Sitare"	Amit Trivedi	Sonu Nigam	3:37
