= Badhaai Ho =

2018 Indian film by Amit Sharma

- Theatrical release poster
- Directed by: Amit Ravindrenath Sharma
- Screenplay by: Akshat Ghildial
- Story by: Shantanu Srivastava; Akshat Ghildial
- Produced by: Vineet Jain; Hemant Bhandari; Aleya Sen; Amit Ravindernath Sharma; Sushil choudhary
- Starring: Ayushmann Khurrana; Neena Gupta; Gajraj Rao; Surekha Sikri; Sanya Malhotra; Shardhul Rana
- Cinematography: Sanu Varghese
- Edited by: Aarti Bajaj
- Music by: Songs: Tanishk Bagchi; Rochak Kohli; JAM8; Sunny Bawra-Inder Bawra; Score: Abhishek Arora
- Production companies: Junglee Pictures; Chrome Pictures
- Distributed by: AA Films
- Release date: 18 October 2018
- Running time: 123 minutes
- Country: India
- Language: Hindi
- Budget: ₹29 crore
- Box office: est. ₹221.44 crore

Badhaai Ho (transl. Congratulations; Hindi pronunciation: [bədʱaːi ɦoː]) is a 2018 Indian Hindi-language comedy drama film directed by Amit Ravindernath Sharma and produced by Sharma, Aleya Sen and Hemant Bhandari under Chrome Pictures and Vineet Jain under Junglee Pictures. It stars Ayushmann Khurrana and Neena Gupta with Gajraj Rao, Surekha Sikri, Shardul Rana and Sanya Malhotra in supporting roles. The film tells the story of a middle-aged couple who get pregnant, much to the disappointment of their sons. Based on a script written by Shantanu Srivastava and Akshat Ghildial and a story conceived by Jyoti Kapoor.

Badhaai Ho received positive reviews and was a commercial success. With earnings of over ₹221.44 crore (US$24 million) against a budget of ₹29 crore (US$3.1 million), it emerged as the ninth-highest-grossing Bollywood film of 2018. The film won four awards at the 64th Filmfare Awards, including Best Actress (Critics) for Gupta, Best Supporting Actress for Sikri, and Best Supporting Actor for Rao. It also won two National Film Awards: Best Popular Film Providing Wholesome Entertainment, the first time where two films featuring the same lead actor (Khurrana) has won both Best Film awards at the National Awards as Andhadhun won Best Film, and Best Supporting Actress for Sikri.

A spiritual successor titled Badhaai Do, released on 11 February 2022.

== Plot ==
Nakul Kaushik is a young professional in a stable relationship with his colleague, Renee, whose mother, Sangeeta, highly approves of him. Nakul lives in a bustling household: his father, Jeetender "Jeetu" Kaushik, is a middle-aged railway employee; his mother, Priyamvada, is a traditional housewife; his younger brother, Gullar, is a high school student; and his grandmother, Durga, constantly bickers with Priyamvada and dominates Jeetu. Following a particularly upsetting argument where Durga taunts Priyamvada, Jeetu consoles his wife, and the couple gets intimate.

Nineteen weeks later, Priyamvada discovers she is pregnant. She and Jeetu decide to keep the baby. When Jeetu announces the third pregnancy to the household, Nakul and Gullar are deeply embarrassed, immediately distancing themselves from their parents and social circles. Durga is equally shocked and disapproving.

As news of the late-stage pregnancy spreads, the family becomes the target of relentless gossip and mockery from relatives, friends, and neighbors. Overwhelmed, Nakul begins avoiding Renee, and both brothers refuse to attend their cousin's upcoming wedding in Meerut. Deeply hurt and angered by their sons' rejection, Jeetu and Priyamvada travel to the wedding accompanied only by Durga. Meanwhile, Nakul struggles to be intimate with Renee as his mother's pregnancy dominates his thoughts. Renee tries to help him process his feelings, but during a party at her home, Sangeeta learns of the pregnancy and speaks mockingly of the Kaushik family. Overhearing the insult, Nakul fiercely defends his parents, causing a rift with Renee but forcing him to realize how poorly he has treated his mother and father.

At the wedding in Meerut, Jeetu's sister and sister-in-law publicly ridicule Priyamvada. In a surprising turn, Durga fiercely defends her daughter-in-law, praising her lifelong dedication to the family and reprimanding the relatives for their selfishness.

Back home, Gullar confesses to Nakul that he was beaten up at school after defending their mother's honour, causing the two brothers to emotionally bond. The next day, Nakul accompanies Gullar to school to confront the bullies, enabling Gullar to stand up for himself. Nakul then confronts his own friends, delivering a sharp response to those who taunted him. When Jeetu, Priyamvada, and Durga return from the wedding, the sons warmly welcome them, and the family fully reconciles. Priyamvada encourages Nakul to patch things up with Renee and Sangeeta, which he successfully does.

During the preparations for the baby shower, Priyamvada suddenly goes into labor and is rushed to the hospital. The doctor successfully delivers a healthy baby girl, bringing immense joy to the entire family. Fifteen months later, Nakul and Renee celebrate their engagement surrounded by their families, including Nakul's toddler sister.

== Cast ==
- Neena Gupta as Priyamvada "Babli" Kaushik
- Ayushmann Khurrana as Nakul Kaushik
- Gajraj Rao as Jitendra "Jeetu" Kaushik
- Surekha Sikri as Durgamati Kaushik
- Sanya Malhotra as Renee Sharma
- Sheeba Chaddha as Sangeeta Sharma
- Shardul Rana as Vishwas "Gullar" Kaushik
- Alka Kaushal as Guddan Kaushik
- Alka Amin as Kokila Kaushik
- Manoj Bakshi as Virendra Kaushik
- Arun Kalra as Sunil Lahiri

== Production ==
The film was shot in two schedules. Principal photography began on 29 January 2018 and the first schedule, in Mumbai, wrapped on 11 February. The second schedule began on 16 February 2018 in Delhi around Street No1, Darya Ganj Ansari Road and ended on 21 March 2018.

== Reception ==
=== Box office ===
Badhaai Ho had a positive first day, earning ₹7.35 crore at the box office, as reported by Boxofficeindia.com. The movie collected ₹56.85 crore in 6 days and went on to collect ₹135.95 crore at the Indian Box Office by the 7th week of its release. Its eventual worldwide gross was ₹221.48 crore.

Critical reception

On the review aggregator website Rotten Tomatoes, 92% of 13 critics' reviews are positive, with an average rating of 7.3/10.

== Remakes ==
The film is set to be remade in Tamil, Telugu, Kannada and Malayalam by Boney Kapoor. The Tamil remake was titled Veetla Vishesham. The film is set to be remade in Indonesian by Falcon Pictures titled Keluarga Slamet with Dessy Ratnasari, Indro Warkop and Widyawati in important roles.

== Soundtrack ==
The songs are composed by Tanishk Bagchi, Rochak Kohli, JAM8 and Sunny Bawra-Inder Bawra. The lyrics are written by Vayu, Kumaar and MellowD. The song ''Morni Banke'' was originally composed by Punjabi MC.

== Awards and nominations ==
| Date of ceremony | Award | Category | Recipient(s) and nominee(s) | Result | Ref(s) |
|---|---|---|---|---|---|
| 16 December 2018 | Star Screen Awards | Best Film | Vineet Jain, Hemant Bhandari and Amit Sharma | Nominated | |
| 16 December 2018 | Star Screen Awards | Best Director | Amit Sharma | Nominated | |
| 16 December 2018 | Star Screen Awards | Best Actor | Ayushmann Khurrana | Nominated | |
| 16 December 2018 | Star Screen Awards | Best Actor | Gajraj Rao | Nominated | |
| 16 December 2018 | Star Screen Awards | Best Actor (Critics) | Gajraj Rao | Won | |
| 16 December 2018 | Star Screen Awards | Best Actress (Critics) | Neena Gupta | Won | |
| 16 December 2018 | Star Screen Awards | Best Supporting Actress | Surekha Sikri | Won | |
| 16 February 2019 | Asiavision Awards | Best Actor (Critics) | Ayushmann Khurrana (also for Andhadhun) | Won | |
| 19 March 2019 | Zee Cine Awards | Best Film | Badhaai Ho | Nominated | |
| 19 March 2019 | Zee Cine Awards | Viewers' Choice Best Film | Badhaai Ho | Nominated | |
| 19 March 2019 | Zee Cine Awards | Best Director | Amit Sharma | Nominated | |
| 19 March 2019 | Zee Cine Awards | Best Actor – Male | Gajraj Rao | Nominated | |
| 19 March 2019 | Zee Cine Awards | Best Actor – Female | Neena Gupta | Nominated | |
| 19 March 2019 | Zee Cine Awards | Best Supporting Actor – Female | Surekha Sikri | Nominated | |
| 19 March 2019 | Zee Cine Awards | Extraordinary Jodi of the Year | Neena Gupta and Gajraj Rao | Won | |
| 23 March 2019 | Filmfare Awards | Best Film | Badhaai Ho | Nominated | |
| 23 March 2019 | Filmfare Awards | Best Film (Critics) | Badhaai Ho | Nominated | |
| 23 March 2019 | Filmfare Awards | Best Director | Amit Sharma | Nominated | |
| 23 March 2019 | Filmfare Awards | Best Actress | Neena Gupta | Nominated | |
| 23 March 2019 | Filmfare Awards | Best Actress (Critics) | Neena Gupta | Won | |
| 23 March 2019 | Filmfare Awards | Best Supporting Actor | Gajraj Rao | Won | |
| 23 March 2019 | Filmfare Awards | Best Supporting Actress | Surekha Sikri | Won | |
| 23 March 2019 | Filmfare Awards | Best Original Story | ~~Akshat Ghildial, Shantanu Srivastava and Jyoti Kapoor~~ | Withdrawn | |
| 23 March 2019 | Filmfare Awards | Best Dialogues | Akshat Ghildial | Won | |
| 23 March 2019 | Filmfare Awards | Best Screenplay | Akshat Ghildial | Nominated | |
| 23 March 2019 | Filmfare Awards | Best Production Design | Ratheesh UK | Nominated | |
| 26 March 2019 | News18 Reel Movie Awards | Best Film | Badhaai Ho | Won | |
| 26 March 2019 | News18 Reel Movie Awards | Best Director | Amit Sharma | Nominated | |
| 26 March 2019 | News18 Reel Movie Awards | Best Actor | Gajraj Rao | Won | |
| 26 March 2019 | News18 Reel Movie Awards | Best Actress | Neena Gupta | Nominated | |
| 26 March 2019 | News18 Reel Movie Awards | Best Supporting Actress | Surekha Sikri | Won | |
| 26 March 2019 | News18 Reel Movie Awards | Best Screenplay | Akshat Ghildial | Won | |
| 26 March 2019 | News18 Reel Movie Awards | Best Dialogues | Akshat Ghildial | Nominated | |
| 26 March 2019 | News18 Reel Movie Awards | Best Production Design | Ratheesh UK | Nominated | |
| 31 March 2019 | BizAsia Online Awards | Best Actor Film (Male) | Ayushmann Khurrana (also for Andhadhun) | Nominated | |
| 16 June 2019 | Matri Shree Media Award | Best Film (media) | Abhishek Cineplex, Chandni Chowk, Delhi | Won | |
| 9 August 2019 | National Film Awards | Best Popular Film Providing Wholesome Entertainment | Badhaai Ho | Won | |
| 9 August 2019 | National Film Awards | Best Supporting Actress | Surekha Sikri | Won | |

== Sequel ==
Junglee Pictures announced in March 2020 that Rajkummar Rao and Bhumi Pednekar will star in the official spiritual sequel of Badhaai Ho, titled Badhaai Do. Initially set to go on floors in June 2020, it was delayed due to the COVID-19 pandemic in India. Principal photography finally commenced on 5 January 2021 in Dehradun, as announced by Rao & Pednekar on their social media accounts.
