= Trial Period =

2023 Indian film by Aleya Sen

- Official release poster
- Directed by: Aleya Sen
- Written by: Dialogues: Aleya Sen; Akshat Trivedi
- Screenplay by: Aleya Sen; Akshat Trivedi; Kunwar Shiv Singh
- Story by: Aleya Sen
- Produced by: Jyoti Deshpande; Hemant Bhandari; Amit Ravindernath Sharma; Aleya Sen
- Starring: Genelia Deshmukh; Manav Kaul; Gajraj Rao; Shakti Kapoor; Sheeba Chadha; Swaroopa Ghosh; Barun Chanda; Zidane Braz
- Cinematography: Manoj Kumar Khatoi
- Edited by: Shahnawaz Mosani
- Music by: Songs: Shantanu Moitra; Arko Pravo Mukherjee; Mago and Mayank; Kaushik-Guddu; Zia; Prachotosh Bhowmick; Score: Anupam Roy
- Production companies: Jio Studios; Chrome Pictures
- Distributed by: JioCinema
- Release date: 21 July 2023
- Country: India
- Language: Hindi

Trial Period is a 2023 Indian Hindi-language comedy drama film co-written and directed by Aleya Sen. It stars Genelia Deshmukh, Manav Kaul, Gajraj Rao, Shakti Kapoor, Sheeba Chadha, Swaroopa Ghosh, Barun Chanda, and Zidane Braz.

The film premiered on JioCinema on 21 July 2023 to positive critic reviews.

At the 2023 Filmfare OTT Awards, Trial Period received 3 nominations, including Best Original Screenplay (Web Original Film) (Shiv Singh, Akshat Trivedi & Aleya Sen) and Best Original Dialogue (Web Original Film) (Aleya Sen & Akshat Trivedi).

== Synopsis ==
Anamaya Roy Choudhary or Ana, is a hardworking single mother living in Delhi's Chittaranjan Park with her six-year-old son Romi. Their lives revolve around a packed routine that balances both Ana's career and her son’s upbringing. However, when Romi is tasked with talking about his non-existent father at school, his curiosity sparks a unique idea — he demands a new papa on a 30-day trial period. This idea was most likely inspired by his mother's maternal uncle who watched advertisements of products being given on a trial period.

On the other hand, Prajapti 'PD' Dwivedi, is a simple yet affable man from Ujjain, who is looking for a job and arrives in Delhi at his paternal uncle's office while Ana is searching for a father on Romi's request.

The story shows how PD, an educated, unemployed man adjusts into the environment created by Ana, a single yet hardworking mother and Romi.

== Cast ==
The cast is as follows:

- Genelia Deshmukh as Anamaya "Ana" Roy Choudhary"
- Manav Kaul as Prajapati Shankar Dwivedi "PD
- Zidane Braz as Romi Roy Choudhary, Ana's son
- Gajraj Rao as Srivastav, PD's uncle
- Shakti Kapoor as Timmy Sharma, Mamaji
- Sheeba Chadha as Timmy Sharma's wife, Mamiji
- Swaroopa Ghosh as Ana's mother
- Barun Chanda as Ana's father
- Raynu Verma as school principal
- Anngad Raaj as Deepak
- Somansh Singh Dangwal as Shakey
- Manju Sharma as Shakey's mother
- Padam Mishra as Gogi's father
- Gagan Ahuja as Lucas
- Ajay Jadhav as peon in Parivartan Placement Service

== Soundtrack ==
Trial Period

Soundtrack album by Arko Pravo Mukherjee, Mago and Mayank
- Released: 9 July 2023
- Genre: Feature film soundtrack
- Length: TBA
- Label: Panorama Music

The music has been composed by Shantanu Moitra, Arko Pravo Mukherjee, Mago & Mayank, and Kaushik-Guddu, while the background music has been composed by Anupam Roy. The lyrics have been penned by Sidhant Mago and Arko.

No.	Title	Lyrics	Music	Singer(S)	Length
1.	"Dhappa"	Sidhant Mago	Mago & Mayank	Saloni Aggarwal, Yashika Sikka, Mayank Mehra	3:05
2.	"Dheere"	Arko Pravo Mukherjee	Arko Pravo Mukherjee	Arko Pravo Mukherjee	4:01
3.	"Gole Male"	Traditional Folk	Kaushik-Guddu, Zia, Prachotosh Bhowmick	Shreya Ghoshal, Dev Negi, Kaushik-Guddu	3:35
4.	"Papa Superhero"	Swanand Kirkire	Shantanu Moitra	Ishaan Chintamani	5:30

== Reception ==
Dhaval Roy of The Times of India said, "Trial Period is a family entertainer worth checking out for the treatment, light-hearted and warm moments, especially the equation between its characters."

Chandhini R of Cinema Express said, "Trial Period is an endearing tale of finding love and belonging."

Sharmistha Ghosal of Indulge Express said, "It has a quirky approach to the pangs of parenting and different opinions are explored in fun-filled ways. It’s a slice of life with a pinch of humor and reflects the need of the time."

Scroll.in said, "Manav Kaul and Genelia Deshmukh turn out lovely performances, either as a make-believe couple or as individuals trying to do what is best for Romi."

Firstpost said, "“Trial Period” benefits from the visionary direction of talented filmmaker Aleya Sen, who has a penchant for selecting unique concepts that draw inspiration from real life. Her artistic and creative touch infuses the storytelling with depth and authenticity, making the movie an immersive and fun cinematic experience."

Cine Blitz said, "The movie introduces a captivating concept of ‘father on rent,’ enthralling viewers with its fresh and innovative narrative. Leading actors, Genelia and Manav Kaul, also join the chorus of admiration for the visionary director, Aleya Sen."

== Accolades ==
Year	Award ceremony	Category	Nominee / work	Result	Ref.
2023	Filmfare OTT Awards	Best Original Screenplay (Web Original Film)	Shiv Singh, Akshat Trivedi & Aleya Sen	Nominated	
2023	Filmfare OTT Awards	Best Original Dialogue (Web Original Film)	Aleya Sen & Akshat Trivedi	Nominated	
2023	Filmfare OTT Awards	Best Cinematographer (Web Original Film)	Manoj Kumar Khatoi	Nominated	
