= Screen Award for Best Actor (Critics) =

Indian cinema award for best actor

Screen Critics Award for Best Actor
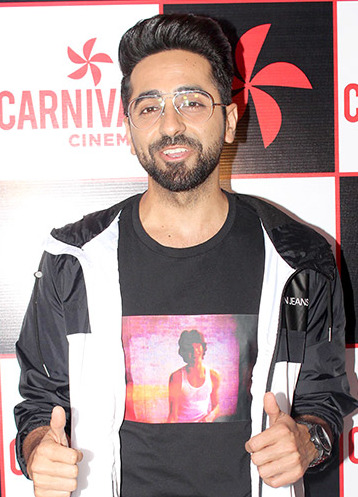
- The 2020 recipients: Ayushmann Khurrana
- Awarded for: Best Performance by an Actor in a Leading Role
- Country: India
- Presented by: Screen
- First award: Sanjay Dutt, Lage Raho Munna Bhai (2007)
- Currently held by: Ayushmann Khurrana, Article 15 (2020)

The Star Screen Award for Best Actor (Critics) is an Indian cinema award.

== Winners ==
Year	Actor	Film
2007	Sanjay Dutt	Lage Raho Munna Bhai
2008	Amitabh Bachchan	Cheeni Kum
2017	Sushant Singh Rajput	M.S. Dhoni: The Untold Story
2018	Rajkumar Rao	Newton
2019	Gajraj Rao	Badhaai Ho
2020	Ayushmann Khurrana	Article 15 Bala

== See also ==
- Screen Awards
- Bollywood
- Cinema of India
