= Andhadhun (soundtrack) =

- Soundtrack album cover

Soundtrack album by Amit Trivedi, Raftaar and Girish Nakod
- Released: 5 September 2018
- Recorded: 2018
- Genre: Feature film soundtrack
- Length: 34:29
- Language: Hindi
- Label: Zee Music Company

Amit Trivedi chronology
Manmarziyaan (2018)	Andhadhun (2018)	Helicopter Eela (2018)

Andhadhun (transl. Blindly) is the soundtrack to the 2018 Indian Hindi-language black comedy crime thriller film of the same name directed by Sriram Raghavan. The album features ten tunes; six songs, three instrumental theme tracks, alternative versions for two of the songs featured in the album. Most of the tracks were composed by Amit Trivedi, excluding one song – the title track of the film was written, composed and recorded by Raftaar and Girish Nakod. Lyrics for Trivedi's compositions were written by Jaideep Sahni and vocals for the songs in the album were provided by Trivedi, Raftaar, Ayushmann Khurrana, Arijit Singh, Abhijeet Srivastava, Aakansha Sharma, Shadab Faridi and Altamash Faridi. The film score was composed by Daniel B. George. The album released on 5 September 2018 through the Zee Music Company record label.

== Development ==
Amit Trivedi stated that he had admired Sriram Raghavan's works since Ek Hasina Thi (2004), and followed up with Johnny Gaddar (2007) and Badlapur (2015). Since he was assigned to score for Andhadhun, he felt it as "a task to fit his music in his film". He also had struggles with the idea to incorporate songs in a film with a blind pianist as a protagonist. With demands for the protagonist to also be a singer (Ayushmann Khurrana, also crooned and composed for few songs in his previous films), the writer and composer decided to turn him into a singer-pianist. It was initially revealed that Ayushmann will reportedly sing one of the tracks in the film or he may work in a separate indie track. However, he crooned vocals for the reprised versions of one of the tracks. Speaking about Khurrana, Trivedi said that "he is a rare combination of a good actor who also sings well".

In an interview with Firstpost-based critic Devansh Sharma during September 2019, Trivedi said that the composition of three romantic tracks "Naina Da Kya Kasoor", "Aap Se Milkar" and "Laila Laila" back-to-back and incorporate in the first half of the film was challenging and was a divided house since "many felt the love between Ayushmann and Radhika's characters was blossoming in those portions". But he felt that "he actual movie starts with the murder scene, and we were taking too long to reach there". Despite being one of his favourite tracks, Trivedi had to remove the track "Aap Se Milkar" from the film as he felt the song was irrelevant and may stretch the narration.

Trivedi presented nine tracks for the album, including the theme tracks. Raftaar and Girish Nakod penned, composed and produced the titular track of the film. The promotional music video of the song shot in Mehboob Studio and choreographed by Prathmesh Dabir, felt it as the "most difficult to shoot", since Khurrana featured in the song blindfolded, along with the background dancers, which made it difficult to shoot the song. The team underwent precautions while shoot the song and the utmost care was taken. As Trivedi felt facing conflicts in composing songs and score, Daniel B. George was later hired to score for the background. The piano themes featured in the album were played by Jarvis Menezes, a Mumbai-based musician.

== Marketing and release ==
On 17 August 2018, the promotional video of the title track "Andhadhun" was released through YouTube. The song featured multiple mirrors set up in a dark room, reflecting a number of images of Khurrana and Tabu, thereby creating a "confusing perception among viewers". The track written by Raftaar and Girish Nakod, who also composed and produced it, is an "upbeat and refreshing number", which begins with a soft piano interlude but gradually percussions are introduced, thereby increasing the energy of the song. The track crossed 10 million views within 24 hours of its release. The second track "Naina Da Kya Kasoor" was released on 28 August 2018. It was pictured on the leads Khurrana and Apte, with the captions in the song concur the notion that "Love is Blind". Speaking about the track, Trivedi said that it is a fun song and adding that "it was a while that he had sung a light-hearted song for an album. Khurrana's character, Akash, is a blind pianist who plays in a café and had to use a lot of piano elements in the song." A different version of the track, sung by Khurrana was released on 2 October 2018 (Gandhi Jayanti) with a video featuring him and few visually-impaired children from a blind school in Mumbai in the camera. Another single, "Aap Se Milkar" was released on 3 September. This track, however, did not feature in the film in its entirety.

== Reception ==
=== Critical response ===
Upon its release on 5 September 2018, the album garnered positive response from critics. Devansh Sharma of Firstpost called it "sweet, edgy, peppy and meditative in equal parts", and said, "The music of Andhadhun is an example of what the piano is capable of in depicting varied seasons and moods. It is dominated by piano pieces but the seasoned composer Trivedi does not let that come into the way of the album's range. Trivedi's nuanced compositions, [Jarvis] Menezes' exceptional skills and Sahni's well-crafted lyrics reiterate that the piano is arguably the most underrated of all musical instruments." Gaurang Chauhan of Times Now said that "The album has the old world charm to it, the one we have been missing from today's time. Even if the songs won't stay with you they are still good enough for a one-time listening." Devarsi Ghosh of Scroll.in stated that the album "could have only had piano-based instrumentals", but we instead get "some passable songs from Trivedi and a title track from rapper Raftaar and his co-composer Girish Nakod"; further saying "Where Trivedi really shines – and seems to have sweated on – are the two piano pieces titled Andhadhun (Theme 1) and Andhadhun (Theme 2)". She said the pieces "evoke pleasantness one minute, dread in the next, and several other moods in between".

Garvita Sharma of The Times of India wrote that it "may not be the best album by Amit Trivedi" but "it's still a standout for it goes hand-in-glove" with the film's theme. Joginder Tuteja of Bollywood Hungama wrote that the album begins well but he found the "overdose of songs" causes it to lose "the sheen that it gathered at the beginning". But further said that "there are a couple of songs in there which are lively and make for a good hearing on loop". Umesh Punwani of Koimoi listed the album in one of his top three albums, further saying, "With the entire symphonic approach, Amit Trivedi has proved why he's the best choirmaster Bollywood has ever had". A review from Indiawest stated it as "a well-conceived and peppy soundtrack from Trivedi". Milliblog-based Karthik Srinivasan stated it as a "chartbursting soundtrack from Trivedi after Bhavesh Joshi Superhero, Fanney Khan and Manmarziyaan". Vipin Nair of Music Aloud said that the album "contains some of the freshest tunes that Trivedi has delivered this year". He further praised Sriram Raghavan for "consistently ensuring good music in his movies, with different composers each time and did not choose to adapt an old song, and went for that retro sound instead." A review from Humming Heart stated it as "a refreshing album which despite carrying a heard-before feeling from different eras, still manages to sound energetic and fun in most places".

=== Chart listings ===
The album was listed in many year-end charts: A Humming Heart and Planet Bollywood (Anish Mohanty). In addition, it appeared in many decade-end lists, such as Filmfare (Deveansh Sharma, in the exclusive edition released on World Music Day; 21 June 2021), Firstpost (Akshay Manwani) and Film Companion (Sankhayan Ghosh). The track "Naina Da Kya Kasoor", appeared in the year-end lists of Bollywood songs in 2018, including Firstpost (Devansh Sharma), Film Companion (Sankhayan Ghosh), Scroll.in (Devarsi Ghosh) and "Aap Se Milkar", was also included in the list published by Rediff.com (Sukanya Verma). Sankhayan Ghosh stated about the track "Naina Da Kya Kasoor" which is a clever take on "O Mere Sona Re" [a popular song composed by R. D. Burman, from the film Teesri Manzil (1966)], where the song and the film was constantly referred in this film. He further added "This intertextuality is perfectly in sync with a film that is its director's own macabre love letter to the golden oldies". "Naina Da Kya Kasoor" also topped the weekly charts in Radio Mirchi, constantly being placed at #1, dominating the position for eight weeks and appeared in the year-end charts at #7.

== Track listing ==
Andhadhun (Original Motion Picture Soundtrack)
No.	Title	Singer(s)	Length
1.	"Naina Da Kya Kasoor"	Amit Trivedi	3:30
2.	"Aap Se Milkar"	Abhijeet Srivastava, Aakanksha Sharma	3:56
3.	"Wo Ladki"	Arijit Singh	4:12
4.	"Laila Laila"	Amit Trivedi	3:23
5.	"Oh Bhai Re"	Shadab Faridi, Altamash Faridi	3:25
6.	"Andhadhun Title Track"	Raftaar	2:54
7.	"Andhadun" (Theme 1)	Amit Trivedi	4:15
8.	"Andhadun" (Theme 2)	Amit Trivedi	2:40
9.	"Naina Da Kya Kasoor" (Electronic)	Amit Trivedi	3:48
10.	"Aap Se Milkar" (Reprise)	Ayushmann Khurrana	2:26
Total length:			34:29

== Awards and nominations ==
Award (Note: Awards, festivals and organisations are in alphabetical order.)	Date of ceremony (Note: Date is linked to the article about the awards held that year, wherever possible.)	Category	Recipients	Result	Ref.
Filmfare Awards	23 March 2019	Best Background Score	Daniel B. George	Won	
Filmfare Awards	23 March 2019	Best Sound Design	Madhu Apsara, Ajay Kumar P. B.	Nominated	
International Indian Film Academy Awards	18 September 2019	Best Music Director	Amit Trivedi	Nominated	
International Indian Film Academy Awards	18 September 2019	Best Lyricist	Jaideep Sahni	Nominated	
International Indian Film Academy Awards	18 September 2019	Best Male Playback Singer	Amit Trivedi – ("Naina Da Kya Kasoor")	Nominated	
International Indian Film Academy Awards	18 September 2019	Best Background Score	Daniel B. George	Won	
International Indian Film Academy Awards	18 September 2019	Best Sound Mixing	Madhu Apsara, Ajay Kumar P. B.	Won	
Mirchi Music Awards	16 February 2019	Best Background Score	Daniel B. George	Nominated	
Screen Awards	16 December 2018	Best Male Playback Singer	Amit Trivedi – ("Naina Da Kya Kasoor")	Nominated	
Zee Cine Awards	19 March 2019	Best Background Score	Daniel B. George	Won	

== Personnel ==
Credits adapted from Zee Music Company

- Amit Trivedi – Composer, producer, music programmer
- Raftaar – Composer, producer, playback singer, lyricist, rap (Track 5)
- Girish Nakod – Composer, producer, lyricist (Track 5)
- Keshia Braganza – Backing vocalist
- Lara Pinto – Backing vocalist
- Gwen Dias – Backing vocalist
- Jarvis Menezes – Piano
- Ankur Mukherjee – Guitar, ukulele, mandolin, banjo
- Sameer Chiplunkar – Accordion
- Akhlak Hussain Varsi – Harmonium
- Naresh Kamath – Live bass
- Satyajit Jamsandekar – Live percussions
- Ratnadeep Jamsandekar – Live percussions
- Dipesh Verma – Live percussions
- Rahul Rupawate – Live percussions
- M. Kalyan – Music conductor (Chennai Strings Orchestra)
- Vineeth Jayan – Music programmer
- Raja Rasaily – Music programmer
- Urmila Sutar – Recording engineer (A T Studios)
- Anubhav Saxena – Recording engineer (Enzy Studios)
- Aditya Shankar – Recording engineer (Kailasa Studios)
- Prachuthosh Bhowmik – Recording engineer (Kailasa Studios)
- D Raj – Recording engineer (DJ Studios)
- Shadab Rayeen – Audio mixing, stereo and iTunes mastering (New Edge Studios)
- Abhishek Ghatak – Audio mixing and mastering
- Abhishek Sortey – Mixing assistance
- Dhananjay Khapekar – Mixing assistance
- Krutee Trivedi – Executive producer (A T Studios)
- Aashish Narula – Head of production (A T Studios)
