= Manmarziyaan (soundtrack) =

Soundtrack album by Amit Trivedi
- Released: 5 September 2018
- Recorded: 2016–2018
- Studios: A T Studios, Mumbai; New Edge Studios, Mumbai; Inderlok Studios, Ludhiana
- Genre: Feature film soundtrack
- Length: 53:54
- Language: Hindi
- Label: Eros Music

Amit Trivedi chronology
Fanney Khan (2018)	Manmarziyaan (2018)	Andhadhun (2018)
External audio
- Official Audio Jukebox on YouTube

Manmarziyaan is the soundtrack album to the 2018 film of the same name directed by Anurag Kashyap and produced by Eros International, Colour Yellow Productions and Phantom Films, starring Vicky Kaushal, Taapsee Pannu and Abhishek Bachchan. The soundtrack to the film featured 14 songs composed by Amit Trivedi and lyrics written by Shellee, Prabh Deep and Sikander Kahlon.

Kashyap chose Trivedi as a composer due to the film's romantic themes and assisted him to curate the tunes. Adapted to the film's setting, the soundtrack had influences of Punjabi music which utilized traditional instrumentation and fused them with electronic soundscapes. Trivedi and Shellee had conducted numerous music sessions with Kashyap on developing the tunes, and in the process, the former had composed 14 songs. It took him nearly two years to conceptualize the film's music after multiple sessions; Trivedi further introduced new singers due to their raw vocals and being authentic to the setting.

Owing to Trivedi and Kashyap's past collaborations being successful, the music of Manmarziyaan was highly anticipated. Capitalizing on the hype, the team wanted to promote the film's music in a unique way, which resulted in the first 10 songs from the album being released as singles during early-August 2018, and a promotional music concert tour held in seven cities across India. The soundtrack was released under the Eros Music label on 5 September 2018.

The soundtrack was acclaimed by music critics, with praise for the compositions, variety in genres, instrumentation and vocals as well as the unconventional approach of integrating Punjabi influences in the film's music, in comparison with other Hindi film soundtracks; it was also appreciated for its integration into the narrative. Due to its unanimous critical and commercial reception, the album featured in several year-end and decade-end lists. Trivedi received nominations for Best Music Director at the Filmfare, IIFA and Zee Cine Awards, and won the Screen Award for Best Music Director; the album received the nomination for Mirchi Music Award for Album of The Year.

== Production ==
Amit Trivedi composed the film score and soundtrack, in his fourth collaboration with Kashyap after Dev.D (2009), Bombay Talkies (2013) and Bombay Velvet (2015); Shellee served as the primary lyricist for the album, having collaborated with Trivedi on Dev.D, Luv Shuv Tey Chicken Khurana (2012) and Udta Punjab (2016). On working with Kashyap, Trivedi stated that the former gave him the direction "in which the music needs to move and I just follow that. Also, I get complete freedom to create without boundaries and I'm inspired to create without fear." The brief given to Trivedi was to make the songs more edgy and commercial, and as for Shellee, who had to refrain writing hardcore Punjabi lyrics, so that the audience can understand them, while also having to do justice to the setting.

Trivedi stated that he had to come up with Punjabi music to reflect the film's setting. During the discussions with Kashyap and the screenwriter Kanika Dhillon, he was astonished on that the film had seven songs only till the interval, which resulted in the film having an importance towards music. Most of the songs were used as partial and full in the narrative, with he and Shelle helped on curating the melody and lyrics. Kashyap helped Trivedi to compose the music till the film's first half, having designed the character of Manmarziyaan, and was also deeply involved in the process of composition. Trivedi had worked on composing the tunes for around two years, where they conducted multiple jamming sessions for curating them.

== Composition ==
"These singers are making their debut with this film (Manmarziyaan). I'm sure doors will open for them after the movie's release. I will work with them in the future too. These days talent and sound scouting have become easy with people posting their work on YouTube and Instagram. When the audience likes a particular singer, there is no stopping that person."

— Trivedi, on scouting new singers for Manmarziyaan album.

According to Trivedi, scouting voices for the songs was a challenging task, where they had demanded fresh and rural voices. This resulted in Trivedi to bring in new talents, besides accompanying seasoned singers, as it was an interesting process. This also helped them to reflect "a mixed set of emotions ranging from angst, joy, love, pain and confusion" and capture different flavors. He admitted that those singers were talented, having raw vocals as the way Kashyap liked his films, and that he and the lyricist had to provide the melody and lyrics to prepare for them. Trivedi called it as an enriching experience working on the album and new talents.

As with Kashyap's previous films, which had quirky terms and hook lines, Kashyap coined the term "F for Fyaar" that was an intentional misspelling for 'pyaar' (transl. love). While composing the song, Trivedi wanted "a Labh Janjua kind of voice", but after his death on 2015, Trivedi wanted his team to look out for a voice that had the similar vibe of Janjua. Through YouTube, he found numerous voices like that and picked one of the demos by Mast Ali, a cop working in the Punjab Police. Vicky Kaushal was convinced by Trivedi to sing the vocals, as the song was based on his character.

Vijay Yamla, a teacher in the Panjab University, was asked to play tumbi where he casually sang during the sessions, which Trivedi liked it and provided him the song "Dhyaanchand". Trivedi found his vocals being raw and has "a beautiful voice and a good command of the Punjabi language." When the song, "Daryaa" was filmed, Kashyap used the song "Pasand Jatt Di" from Qismat composed by Ammy Virk as a reference and sent him the footage. While Trivedi insisted on buying the rights for the song, Kashyap insisted him to compose an original song, which resulted him to reach out Virk and provide vocals for the track.

Trivedi used traditional Punjabi instruments, such as tumbi, esraj, dhol, dhadd, algoza along with other classical instruments to create the soundscape he intended and fused them with electronic music.

== Marketing and release ==
"Music pulsates through the story of 'Manmarziyaan' and Anurag and Amit have always made an explosive combination. The film boasts of 14 unforgettable compositions, sung by some of the country's best voices. We wanted young audiences to wake up to these songs and then enhance the experience by listening to these amazing compositions live. As producers, we believe that this album deserved a platform of this stature."

— Sunil Lulla, managing director of Eros International, on the unique marketing strategy of the Manmarziyaan soundtrack.

=== Promotion ===
Kashyap wanted to orchestrate the launch of the film's music in an unconventional manner, and discussed it with co-producer Aanand L. Rai of Colour Yellow Productions and Sunil Lulla, managing director of Eros International, regarding the same. As Rai was impressed with Trivedi's compositions, he volunteered to promote the soundtrack in a unique way over a conventional music launch.

After the film's trailer release on 8 August 2018, the team released the first song "F for Fyaar" on 10 August, and released the remaining nine songs from the album each day, with "Daryaa" on 11 August, "Grey Walaa Shade" on 12 August, "Dhyaanchand" on 13 August, "Chonch Ladhiyaan" on 14 August, "Hallaa" on 15 August, "Sacchi Mohabbat" on 16 August, "Jaisi Teri Marzi" on 17 August, and "Bijlee Giregi" on 18 August. The soundtrack was released on 5 September.

=== Concert tour ===
The team announced Manmarziyaan Music Concerts, which was held in seven cities—Mumbai, Delhi, Chandigarh, Nagpur, Indore, Hyderabad and Bangalore—from 19 August–9 September. Over 20 singers had performed the songs at each concert tours, along with Kaushal, Pannu, and Bachchan in attendance.

== Reception ==
=== Critical ===
Vipin Nair of The Hindu gave the soundtrack four out of five, stating that though the "repetitiveness gets in the way on more than one occasion, the composer [Trivedi] still manages to deliver a supremely engaging soundtrack, with ample help from Shellee and a bunch of incredible musicians." The Times of India-based Debarati Sen, in her review, said that the lyricist-composer combo ensures that the album "finds a way to your playlist" describging it as "worth a reckoning." Devarsi Ghosh of Scroll.in described it as "the best Bollywood album of 2018" adding that "each song has a personality of its own, which makes the soundtrack stand out from among the usual Bollywood-Punjabi clutter." Karthik Srinivasan of Milliblog wrote "Amit offers a riveting follow-up to Udta Punjab in Manmarziyaan".

Suanshu Khurana of The Indian Express rated two-and-a-half stars, summarizing "The album isn't a thunderstorm in terms of the tunes sticking in the head. It rises and falls. But every piece of orchestration that comes in contact with the audience is enough for a listening session." Anvita Singh, writing for the same publication, described the album as "original, soulful and just a whole lot of fun" where "each track tells a story and it ties in with the movie's narrative beautifully." Joginder Tuteja of Bollywood Hungama wrote "Manmarziyaan boasts of a good soundtrack as the entire team comes up with the kind of songs that complement the genre that the film belongs to."

=== Commercial ===
Manmarziyaan has featured in both year-end and decade-lists. The song "Halla" was ranked as one of the best Hindi film songs of 2018 by Scroll.in adding that "the album did have other great songs, such as the anguish-filled Daryaa and the sublime Grey Walaa Shade, but it was Hallaa that was the most successfully sonic experiment." P. Manorama mentioned the album in her year-end review to The Hindu, stating "Manmarziyaan, despite being strongly reminiscent of Trivedi's own Udta Punjab, largely belonged to the same soundscape that Trivedi and Kashyap invented in Dev D."

Vipin Nair mentioned "Hallaa" and "Grey Walaa Shade" in their best Hindi songs of 2018. Sankhayan Ghosh of Film Companion ranked "Chonch Ladhiyaan" as one of the best Hindi songs, while Sukanya Verma included "Daryaa" in her year-end list of best songs. Akshay Manwani of Firstpost mentioned it in his decade-end list, summarizing "Although the Manmarziyaan score is not anywhere near as unconventional as Kashyap's Gulaal (2009) or Gangs of Wasseypur (2012), it is still very, very interesting." Devesh Sharma of Filmfare also mentioned the album in his decade-end list, as a special mention. Tatsam Mukherjee of HuffPost also included in the best albums in the past years since the 2000s.

== Track listing ==
No.	Title	Lyrics	Singer(s)	Length
1.	"F for Fyaar"	Shellee, Sikander Kahlon	Vicky Kaushal, Mast Ali, Sikander Kahlon	3:52
2.	"Daryaa"	Shellee	Ammy Virk, Shahid Mallya	4:21
3.	"Grey Walaa Shade"	Shellee	Harshdeep Kaur, Jazim Sharma	4:43
4.	"Dhyaanchand"	Shellee	Vijay Yamla, Nikhita Gandhi, Amit Trivedi, Suhas Sawant	4:10
5.	"Chonch Ladhiyaan"	Shellee	Harshdeep Kaur, Jazim Sharma	4:55
6.	"Hallaa"	Shellee	Jyoti Nooran, Romi	4:49
7.	"Sacchi Mohabbat"	Shellee	Shahid Mallya, Jonita Gandhi	4:15
8.	"Jaisi Teri Marzi"	Shellee	Harshdeep Kaur, Bhanu Pratap Singh	3:50
9.	"Bijlee Giregi"	Shellee	Devender Pal Singh, Babu Haabi, Sikander Kahlon, Vaishali Sardana	3:41
10.	"Kundali"	Shellee	Meenal Jain, Yashita Sharma, Yashika Sikka, Rani Kaur, Anita Gandharva, Meghna Mishra, Vaishnavi Mishra	3:47
11.	"Daryaa" (Unplugged)	Shellee	Deveshi Sahgal	3:29
12.	"Jala Di"	Shellee	Romy, Jatinder Singh	3:49
13.	"Fyaar Pe Duniya"	Shellee	Alamgir Khan	2:43
14.	"Sherni"	Prabh Deep	Prabh Deep	1:30
Total length:				53:54

== Personnel ==
- Amit Trivedi – composer, producer, musical arrangements, programming
- Vineeth Jayan – programming
- Gourab Dutta – programming
- Raja Rasaily – programming
- Tapas Roy – tumbi, mandolin, saz, bouzouki
- Paras Nath – flute
- Sanjoy Das – guitar
- Ridu Shaw – guitar
- Vijay Yamla – tumbi, tumba, been, dhadd, bugdu, algoza
- Kukki Jogi – dhol
- Arshad Khan – esraj
- Satyajit Jamsandekar – dholak, percussions
- Sanket Naik – percussions
- Omkar Dhumal – shehnai
- Akhlak Hussain Varsi – harmonium
- Abhishek Sortey – recording engineer (A T Studios, Mumbai)
- Urmila Sutar – recording engineer (A T Studios, Mumbai)
- Dinesh Sharma – recording engineer (Inderlok Studio, Ludhiana)
- Shadab Rayeen – mixing and mastering engineer (New Edge Studios, Mumbai)
- Firoz Shaikh – musical assistance
- Dhananjay Khapekar – musical assistance
- Krutee Trivedi – executive producer
- Aashish Narula – head of production

== Accolades ==
Award (Note: Awards, festivals and organizations are in alphabetical order.)	Date of ceremony (Note: Each date is linked to the article about the awards held that year, wherever possible.)	Category	Recipient(s)	Result	Ref.
Filmfare Awards	23 March 2019	Best Music Director	Amit Trivedi	Nominated	
Filmfare Awards	23 March 2019	Best Background Score	Amit Trivedi	Nominated	
International Indian Film Academy Awards	18 September 2019	Best Music Director	Amit Trivedi	Nominated	
International Indian Film Academy Awards	18 September 2019	Best Lyricist	Shellee – "Daryaa"	Nominated	
Mirchi Music Awards	16 February 2019	Album of The Year	Manmarziyaan	Nominated	
Mirchi Music Awards	16 February 2019	Listeners' Choice Album of The Year	Manmarziyaan	Nominated	
Mirchi Music Awards	16 February 2019	Upcoming Male Vocalist of the Year	Jazim Sharma – "Grey Walaa Shade"	Nominated	
Mirchi Music Awards	16 February 2019	Upcoming Male Vocalist of the Year	Jazim Sharma – "Chonch Ladhiyaan"	Nominated	
Mirchi Music Awards	16 February 2019	Upcoming Female Vocalist of the Year	Deveshi Sahgal – "Khalibali"	Nominated	
Screen Awards	16 December 2018	Best Music Director	Amit Trivedi	Won	
Screen Awards	16 December 2018	Best Male Playback Singer	Ammy Virk and Shahid Mallya – "Daryaa"	Nominated	
Screen Awards	16 December 2018	Best Female Playback Singer	Harshdeep Kaur – "Chonch Ladhiyaan"	Nominated	
Screen Awards	16 December 2018	Best Female Playback Singer	Jazim Sharma – "Chonch Ladhiyaan"	Nominated	
Zee Cine Awards	19 March 2019	Best Music Director	Amit Trivedi	Nominated	
