= Dil Juunglee =

2018 film by Aleya Sen

- Directed by: Aleya Sen
- Screenplay by: Tonoya Sen Sharma; Shiv Singh
- Story by: Aleya Sen
- Produced by: Deepshikha Deshmukh; Jackky Bhagnani; Mudit Jain; Mayank Jain
- Starring: Taapsee Pannu; Saqib Saleem; Nidhi Singh; Abhilash Thapliyal; Srishti Shrivastava; Ayesha Kaduskar; Santosh Barmola
- Cinematography: Amol Rathod
- Edited by: Dev Rao Jadhav
- Music by: Score; Abhishek Arora; Songs; Tanishk Bagchi; Shaarib-Toshi; Guru Randhawa; Rajat Nagpal; Abhishek Arora
- Production company: Pooja Entertainment
- Release date: 9 March 2018
- Running time: 124 minutes
- Country: India
- Language: Hindi
- Box office: ₹1.30 crore

Dil Juunglee (transl. Wild heart) is an Indian romantic comedy film written and directed by Aleya Sen. It stars Taapsee Pannu, Saqib Saleem, Abhilash Thapliyal, Nidhi Singh, Ayesha Kaduskar, Srishti Shrivastava and Santosh Barmola. It was released on 9 March 2018 to mainly negative reviews.

== Plot ==
Koroli Nair, the only child of a London-based business tycoon, relocates to Delhi in pursuit of happiness." Despite disappointing her father, she lacks the desire to pursue entrepreneurship and instead longs to find a life partner and become a loving mother to her future children. Ultimately, she finds fulfillment and satisfaction by teaching English at the British Council in New Delhi.

Sumit Uppal is a gym trainer, from Lajpat Nagar. He has dreams of entering Bollywood. He works hard to stay fit. He is hoping for an opportunity to become an actor. His dream is simple but meaningful. His dream is to make a name for himself in the film industry. His dream is to walk the carpet. His dream is to meet Bollywood stars.

He joins Koroli's English class at the British Council. Initially meeting one another as a teacher and student, their proximity escalates when they meet each other in a nightclub. Later, this creates a path for attraction, with the radically opposite duo growing close to one another.

The story revolves around the friendship and love story of Sumit and Koroli, along with the general nuances of a relationship. The ups and downs of love and friendship are portrayed in various manners.

== Cast ==
- Taapsee Pannu as Koroli Nair
- Saqib Saleem as Sumit Uppal
- Abhilash Thapliyal as Prashant
- Nidhi Singh as Ayesha Kumar
- Srishti Shrivastava as Shumi
- Ayesha Kaduskar as Geetika
- Santosh Barmola as Jai Singh Rathore
- Krishan Tandon as Mr. Nair, Koroli's Father

== Soundtrack ==
Dil Juunglee

Soundtrack album by Tanishk Bagchi, Shaarib-Toshi, Guru Randhawa, Rajat Nagpal and Abhishek Arora
- Released: 1 March 2018
- Genre: Feature film soundtrack
- Length: 17:13
- Language: Hindi
- Labels: T-Series (Gazab Ka Hai Din and Nachle Na); Sony Music India (Beat Juunglee and 2 songs)

Tanishk Bagchi chronology
Hate Story 4 (2018)	Dil Juunglee (2018)	Raid (2018)

Guru Randhawa, Rajat Nagpal chronology
Kis Kisko Pyaar Karoon (2015)	Dil Juunglee (2018)	Sonu Ke Titu Ki Sweety (2018)

Shaarib-Toshi chronology
Masaan (2015)	Dil Juunglee (2018)	Manmarziyaan (2018)

Abhishek Arora chronology
Singh Is Bliing (2015)	Dil Juunglee (2018)	October (2018)

The song Gazab Ka Hai Din is the remake of the song originally composed by Anand–Milind and sung by Alka Yagnik and Udit Narayan from the film Qayamat Se Qayamat Tak, recreated by Tanishk Bagchi.

Track listing
No.	Title	Lyrics	Music	Singer(s)	Length
1.	"Nachle Na"	Guru Randhawa	Guru Randhawa, Rajat Nagpal	Guru Randhawa, Neeti Mohan	3:40
2.	"Gazab Ka Hai Din"	Tanishk Bagchi, Arafaat Mehmood	Tanishk Bagchi Original Track by Anand–Milind	Jubin Nautiyal, Prakriti Kakar	3:56
3.	"Beat Juunglee"	Tanishk-Vayu (Tanishk Bagchi)	Tanishk Bagchi	Armaan Malik, Prakriti Kakar	2:10
4.	"Bandeya"	Dr. Devendra Kafir	Shaarib-Toshi	Arijit Singh	3:05
5.	"Dil Jaane Na"	Abhiruchi Chand	Abhishek Arora	Mohit Chauhan, Neeti Mohan	4:22
Total length:					17:13

== Critical reception ==
Renuka Vyavahare of The Times of India gave the film a rating of 2.5 out of 5 saying that, "Barring the earnest performances of the lead actors and the supporting cast, there's absolutely nothing wild or memorable about Dil Juunglee." Sweta Kausal of the Hindustan Times gave the film a rating of 2 out of 5 saying that, "Dil Juunglee is yet another repeat of the centuries-old love story with a cliched narrative. It is only Taapsee Pannu's charm and Saqib Saleem's earthiness that keep the movie from getting unbearable." Saibal Chatterjee of NDTV gave the film a rating of 1.5 out of 5 saying that, " Every bit in Taapsee Pannu and Saqib Saleem's film is a bit on the wild side, completely arbitrary and illogical." Shubhra Gupta of The Indian Express gave the film a rating of 1 out of 5 saying that, "The Taapsee Pannu and Saqib Saleem starrer follows the standard rom-com template, and apart from literally a few moments, the whole thing is a slog."

Namrata Joshi of The Hindu reviewed the film saying that, "Disjointed, tackily put together with no sense of drama and direction, it will be difficult to top this one on the inanity stakes this year." Sukanya Verma of Rediff gave the film a rating of 1 out of 5 saying that, "Just when it looks our film-making is moving away from idolising toxic archetypes for the sake of romantic fulfillment, Aleya Sen's Dil Juunglee comes along and squashes it in entirety." Umesh Panwani of Koimoi gave the film a rating of 1 out of 5 saying that, "Dil Juunglee is one of those films you give someone a dare to watch." Arnab Banerjee of Deccan Chronicle gave the film a rating of 1 out of 5 saying that, "Touted as a romantic comedy this Taapsee Pannu and Saqib Saleem starrer is the kind of film whose screenwriting, acting and plot twists are so unforgivable, they leave you more embarrassed than entertained."
