= Gajraj Rao =

Indian actor (born Dec 1970)

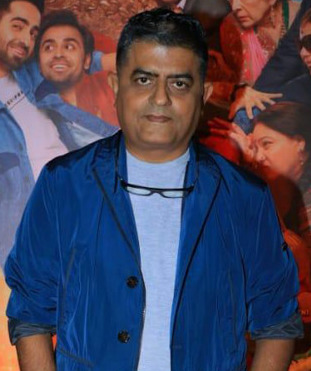
- Gajraj Rao in 2020
- Born: Dungarpur, Rajasthan, India
- Occupation: Actor
- Years active: 1994–present
- Known for: Black Friday, Badhaai Ho, Shubh Mangal Zyada Saavdhan
- Spouse: Sanjana Rao
- Children: 2 sons

Gajraj Rao is an Indian actor who appears predominantly in Hindi films. He is widely known for his performance in the comedy-drama film Badhaai Ho for which he won the Filmfare Award for Best Supporting Actor.

== Career ==
He debuted in 1994 with a minor role in Shekhar Kapur's Bandit Queen and has since worked in many films and web-series. Rao is known for his leading role in Badhaai Ho and supporting roles in movies like Talvar, Blackmail and web-series like TVF'S F.A.T.H.E.R.S. and Tech Conversations with Dad.

He also directed a number of ad-films with Code Red Films.

== Filmography ==
Key
†	Denotes films/shows/series that have not yet been released

=== Films ===
Year	Film	Role	Notes
1994	Bandit Queen	Ashok Chand Thakur	
1995	Pathreela Raasta		
1998	Dil Se..	CBI investigation officer	
2000	Dil Pe Mat Le Yaar!!	Tiwariji	
2001	Aks	RAW officer	
2002	Chhal		
2002	Dil Hai Tumhaara		
2002	Yeh Kya Ho Raha Hai?		
2003	Hazaaron Khwaishein Aisi	Junior Bihari constable	
2005	Yahaan	Home Minister	
2007	Black Friday	Dawood Phanse	
2007	No Smoking	Rajendra Kishan Dhingra	
2008	Aamir	The Caller	
2014	Bhoothnath Returns	Sarkari officer in Bhoot World	
2015	Talvar	Inspector Dhaniram	
2016	Budhia Singh – Born to Run	Chairman, Child Welfare	
2017	Rangoon	Ahuja	
2018	Love per Square Foot	Mr. Rehmat	
2018	Blackmail	Chawla	
2018	Badhaai Ho	Jeetendra Kaushik	Filmfare Award for Best Supporting Actor
2019	Made in China	Abhay Chopra	
2020	Shubh Mangal Zyada Saavdhan	Shankar Tripathi	Nominated – Filmfare Award for Best Supporting Actor
2020	Lootcase	Minister Patil	
2022	Maja Ma	Manohar Patel	
2022	Thai Massage	Atmaram Dubey	
2023	Bholaa	Devraj	
2023	Satyaprem Ki Katha	Narayan	
2023	Trial Period	Srivastav	
2024	Maidaan	Roy Chaudhary	
2024	Bad Newz	Akhil's dead father	special appearance
2024	Yudhra	Karthik Rathore	
2025	Jolly LLB 3	Haribhai Khaitan	
2026	Lust Stories 3	Abbujaan	

=== Web series ===
Year	Series	Role	Channel
2015	Bang Baaja Baaraat	Murli Prasad Sharma	Y-Films
2016	A Day With RD Sharma	Prof RD Sharma	TVF
2017	F.A.T.H.E.R.S.	Bhatia	TVF
2018	Tech Conversations with Dad	"Dad"	TVF
2019	TVF Tripling Season 2	Prince Alexander	TVF
2020	Masaba Masaba	Himself	Netflix
2020	PariWar	Kashiram Narayan	Disney+ Hotstar
2021	Ray	Aslam Baig	Netflix
2025	Dabba Cartel	Inspector Deshmukh	Netflix
2025	Dupahiya	Banwari Jha	Amazon Prime Video

== Accolades ==
Year	Film	Award	Category	Result	Ref.
2016	Talvar	Producers Guild Film Awards	Best Actor in a Negative Role	Nominated	
2016	Talvar	17th IIFA Awards	Best Performance in a Negative Role	Nominated	
2018	Badhaai Ho	25th Screen Awards	Best Actor	Nominated	
2018	Badhaai Ho	25th Screen Awards	Best Actor (Critics)	Won	
2019	Badhaai Ho	Zee Cine Awards	Best Actor (Critics)	Nominated	
2019	Badhaai Ho	Zee Cine Awards	Extraordinary Jodi of the Year	Won (Note: Shared with Neena Gupta.)	
2019	Badhaai Ho	64th Filmfare Awards	Best Supporting Actor	Won (Note: Tied with Vicky Kaushal for Sanju)	
2021	Shubh Mangal Zyada Saavdhan	66th Filmfare Awards	Best Supporting Actor	Nominated	
