= Blackmail (2018 film) =

2018 Indian film by Abhinay Deo

- Directed by: Abhinay Deo
- Written by: Story & screenplay: Parveez Shaikh; Dialogues: Pradhuman Singh Mall
- Produced by: Bhushan Kumar; Krishan Kumar; Abhinay Deo; Apurba Sengupta
- Starring: Irrfan Khan; Kirti Kulhari; Divya Dutta; Arunoday Singh; Omi Vaidya
- Cinematography: Jay Oza
- Edited by: Huzefa Lokhandwala
- Music by: Songs: Amit Trivedi; Guest composers: Badshah; Guru Randhawa; Background score: Mikey McCleary; Parth Parekh
- Production companies: T-Series Films; RDP Motion Pictures
- Distributed by: T-Series Films (India); Eros International (Overseas)
- Release date: 6 April 2018
- Running time: 139 minutes
- Country: India
- Language: Hindi
- Budget: ₹18 crore (equivalent to ₹26 crore or US$2.8 million in 2026)
- Box office: ₹28.81 crore (equivalent to ₹42 crore or US$4.5 million in 2026)

Blackmail (stylised as Blackमेल) is a 2018 Indian Hindi-language black comedy film co-produced and directed by Abhinay Deo. The film stars Irrfan Khan, Kirti Kulhari, Arunoday Singh and Divya Dutta in lead roles and is produced by Bhushan Kumar, Krishan Kumar, Apurba Sengupta and Rohit KaduDeshmukh under the banner of T-Series Films and RDP Motion Pictures. Blackmail depicts the life of a married-man in his late 30s stuck in a full day-time job and unexciting life but things turn after he finds that his wife is having an extramarital affair. The film had its theatrical release in India on 6 April 2018 and turned out to be a Sleeper Hit at the box office.

== Plot ==
Dev Kaushal (Irrfan Khan) is a toilet paper sales executive who is leading a dispirited life professionally and personally. One day, to surprise his wife Reena Kaushal (Kirti Kulhari) he arrives early from the office. Instead, he finds his wife in bed with another man named Ranjit "Tommy" Arora (Arunoday Singh). Without doing anything, Dev leaves and decides to follow Ranjit to find out more about him.

Ranjit is married to Dolly Verma (Divya Dutta), who has a rich dad. Dev blackmails Ranjit after managing to collect his personal information. Ranjit arranges the money from Dolly. When Dolly's father asks Ranjit to return the cash, he blackmails Reena. Dev reveals his plans to his colleague Anand (Pradhuman Singh Mall). Reena asks Dev for money, saying it is for her dad's treatment. Dev gives her the money by asking for more from Ranjit. Reena keeps the money in a dust bin and Dev collects it, again.

As this is occurring, Dev's boss (Omi Vaidya) remarks that he is losing market share to bidet manufacturers. He is planning to sabotage the city water supply in order to show its population why they need toilet paper. He asks Dev to convince the Municipal corporation (India) to shut off the water for 12 hours, but is initially unsuccessful.

Anand, who has a crush on Prabha Ghatpandey (Anuja Sathe), a colleague, takes her on a date and reveals Dev's plans. The very next day Prabha blackmails Dev for money. Dev confronts Anand and then asks Ranjit for money. Ranjit in turn asks Reena for money and Reena asks Dev for the money. From the cash received earlier Dev sends the amount to Reena's account, while Reena puts the money in a dustbin. Ranjit collects it and throws it in a dustbin which Dev collects and gives to Prabha. Ranjit listens to Reena's advice and hires a detective, Chawla (Gajraj Rao) to catch the blackmailer. Prabha blackmails Dev again for more money but he visits her apartment to confront her and they argue. Prabha slips on her own during the argument and dies. Suddenly Prabha's parents arrive at the apartment. Dev manages to escape by wearing a mask made out of a Paper bag.

The next morning, police arrive and interrogate everyone in the office. Anand threatens Dev that he will reveal everything to the police because he believes that Dev has killed Prabha. Upon interrogation, Dev reveals to the police that Anand liked Prabha. Dev convinces Anand to hide the truth from the police. Using Anand's car Dev purchases the same bag he used last night and hides it in Anand's car, following which the police arrest Anand. Anand panics and reveals everything about Dev to the police but they don't believe him entirely. Meanwhile, Chawla calls Dev telling him he knows about his ruse.

The police then interrogate Dev. Dolly follows Ranjit and sees him together with Reena in the cinema hall. Anand comes out of police custody and fights with Dev, but Dev calms him down with the greed of money. Dev meets Chawla who starts blackmailing him for money. When Ranjit comes back home, Dolly tries to kill him, and as they fight Ranjit shoots her dead. Aghast, he hides her body. Dev blackmails Ranjit (to pay Chawla), warning he will reveal the affair to Dolly's father. Ranjit asks Reena for more money, and Reena asks Dev for money, but this time Dev refuses.

Dev tries to find out if Reena is lying to him about her father's treatment. Dev follows her, watching her sell her jewelry, and drops the cash in the dustbin at a Mall. Dev tries to take it out, but Ranjit reaches there first and takes the money. Dev takes pictures of Ranjit taking the money. Ranjit hides the money in the dustbin and waits there to catch the blackmailer. Dev bribes a security guard to take out that money. Ranjit tries to catch the guard, as Dev collects the money and then later gives it to Chawla. Dev then asks Chawla to call Ranjit and tell him that the blackmailer is Anand. Furious, Ranjit kills Anand. Dev sends the pictures of Ranjit taking money to Reena. Meanwhile, Dolly's parents call the police as they find out that Ranjit has murdered their daughter.

Back at home, heartbroken Reena deletes Ranjit's contact from her phone and messages Dev asking when he will come home. Dev deletes Reena's contact and walks out of the office.

A mid-credits scene reveals that the plan to shut off the city's water supply succeeded. This resulted in skyrocketing bottled water sales - exactly the opposite of what his boss wanted. A song plays showing Dev and Reena's wedding 7 years prior.

== Cast ==
- Irrfan Khan as Dev Kaushal, a sales executive who works in a company that manufactures toilet papers. Dev is dissatisfied with his job because it doesn't pay him enough, as well as his marriage because his wife doesn't love him the way he loves her.
- Kirti Kulhari as Reena Kaushal, a woman who is having an affair with Ranjit, who used to be her boyfriend before she married Dev.
- Arunoday Singh as Ranjit Arora, a jobless man who married Dolly for her money and is later blackmailed by Dev for indulging in an affair with his wife Reena.
- Divya Dutta as Dolly Verma, Ranjit's wife and daughter of a rich and powerful businessman.
- Pradhuman Singh Mall as Anand Tripathi, Dev's best friend & colleague and Prabha's love interest who is aware of everything that is happening in Dev's life.
- Omi Vaidya as Boss D. K., the boss of Dev, Anand and Prabha, who constantly comes up with bizarre ideas to promote his company's product.
- Anuja Sathe as Prabha Ghatpande, a colleague of Dev and Anand, who blackmails Dev after Anand accidentally reveals everything about Dev's plan to her.
- Gajraj Rao as Mr. Chawala, a private detective who is hired by Ranjit to find out the identity of his blackmailer. He always speaks in 3rd person to his clients.
- Vibha Chibber as Mrs. Chawala, a blind woman, Mr. Chawla's wife and a dealer of guns.
- Navratan Singh Rathore as Mr. Verma, Dolly's father.
- Neelima Azeem as Mrs. Verma, Dolly's mother.
- Atul Kale as BST Shankar.
- Anjali Ujawane as Mrs. Ghatpande, Prabha's mother.
- Abhijeet Chavan as Inspector Pramod Rawle.
- Urmila Matondkar as Mili, an item number in the song "Bewafa Beauty"; special appearance.
- Sharad Jadhav as a Police Constable
- Zaheer as a Boy at Chawl
- Suresh Yadav as Pandey Singh, a security guard at My Handy's office.
- Mridul Daas as Cashier at the Mobile Shop
- Pravina Bhagwat Deshpande as Mrs. Kaushal, Reena's mother
- Tanuka Laghate as a TV Reporter
- Rajesh S. Khatri as Mr. Kaushal, Reena's father

== Production ==
=== Development ===
The genesis of the film traces back to 2014 when Abhinay Deo had announced that his next film would be a dark comedy set in Mumbai. In January 2015, it was reported that Rakesh Roshan would be producing Abhinay Deo's next film which would have Irrfan Khan and Aditi Rao Hydari as the lead actors playing husband and wife. Kunal Kapoor, Kunaal Roy Kapur and Vijay Raaz were also signed on to be a part of the project and the shooting was supposed to begin at the end of February. In June 2015, it was reported that Rakesh Roshan had dropped the project that he was doing with Abhinay Deo citing creative differences. One year later in August 2016, Abhinay Deo said that after he completed the work on Force 2, he planned to revive the film that he was supposed to do with Irrfan Khan before it was shelved. In November 2016, Abhinay Deo's film was given a working title of Blackmail and in February 2017 it was confirmed that T-Series had come on board to produce the film along with co-producer Rohit KaduDeshmukh. In April 2017, it was reported that the title of the film had been changed to Raita and Kirti Kulhari would be playing the role of Irrfan's wife in the film instead of Aditi Rao Hydari who was the first choice of the director. The principal photography of the film began on 4 April 2017 and the entire shoot was done in Mumbai itself. In December 2017, the film was officially renamed as Blackmail and it was announced that the film would have its theatrical release on 30 March 2018.

== Marketing ==
After the special screening for Amitabh Bachchan on 31 March 2018, the makers organized another special screening on 2 April 2018 in the absence of lead actor Irrfan Khan (who was undergoing treatment for a neuroendocrine tumor in the UK) for contemporary Bollywood film directors, which was attended by Rajkumar Hirani, Amol Gupte, Nishikant Kamat, Ashutosh Gowarikar, Tanuja Chandra, Meghna Gulzar, Ravi Udyawar, Rensil D'Silva, Sudhir Mishra, Sriram Raghavan, Soumik Sen, Pradeep Sarkar, Mukesh Chhabra and others, to a positive response.

== Soundtrack ==
Blackmail

Soundtrack album by Amit Trivedi, Yo Yo Honey Singh and Guru Randhawa
- Released: 23 March 2018
- Recorded: 2015
- Genre: Film soundtrack
- Length: 23:11
- Language: Hindi
- Label: T-Series
- Producers: Amit Trivedi; Yo Yo Honey Singh; Guru Randhawa
External audio
- Official Audio Jukebox on YouTube

Amit Trivedi chronology
Raid (2018)	Blackmail (2018)	Fanney Khan (2018)

Badshah chronology
Welcome Back (2015)	Blackmail (2018)	Nawabzaade (2018)

Guru Randhawa chronology
Dil Juunglee (2018)	Blackmail (2018)	Nawabzaade (2018)

The album is a compilation of six tracks, four of which were composed by Amit Trivedi while the other two were composed by the guest musicians Badshah and Guru Randhawa. The lyrics of the songs were written by Amitabh Bhattacharya, Badshah, Guru Randhawa and Divine. The entire music album was officially released on 23 March 2018.

Guru Randhawa recreated his track "Patola", originally composed by Preet Hundal.

Track listing
No.	Title	Lyrics	Music	Singer(s)	Length
1.	"Happy Happy"	Badshah	Yo Yo Honey Singh	Badshah; Aastha Gill	2:46
2.	"Patola"	Guru Randhawa	Guru Randhawa	Guru Randhawa	3:04
3.	"Bewafa Beauty"	Amitabh Bhattacharya	Amit Trivedi	Pawni Pandey	4:41
4.	"Badla"	Amitabh Bhattacharya; Divine; Dhaval Parab	Amit Trivedi	Amit Trivedi; Divine	3:41
5.	"Nindaraan Diyaan"	Amitabh Bhattacharya	Amit Trivedi	Amit Trivedi	5:28
6.	"Sataasat"	Amitabh Bhattacharya	Amit Trivedi	Amit Trivedi	3:30
Total length:					23:11

== Critical reception ==
Rajeev Masand gave the film a rating of 3 out of 5 and said that, "It's the film's unique brand of humor – some of it pitch black and Coen-esque – that makes Blackmail worth your time, despite its shortcomings." Sweta Kausal of Hindustan Times gave the film a rating of 3 out of 5 and said that Blackmail is a "Fun filled and realistic story-telling made interesting with engaging and hilarious performances of Irrfan Khan and Divya Dutta". Rachit Gupta of The Times of India gave the film a rating of 4 out of 5 saying that, "The plot of Blackmail is its hero and it manages to strike a good balance between dark and funny. This is one of the most wickedly funny films that we’ve seen in a long time." Raja Sen of NDTV gave the film a rating of 1.5 out of 5 and said that, "Irrfan is incapable of giving a bad performance but Abhinay Deo's farce is too tacky and poorly-conceived to do Khan justice". Shubhra Gupta of The Indian Express gave the film a rating of 2 out of 5 and said that, "The Irrfan Khan starrer begins promisingly but descends pretty quickly into flatness and sluggishness, a classic problem of not knowing quite how to play out a perky idea."
