= Aleya Sen =

Indian director

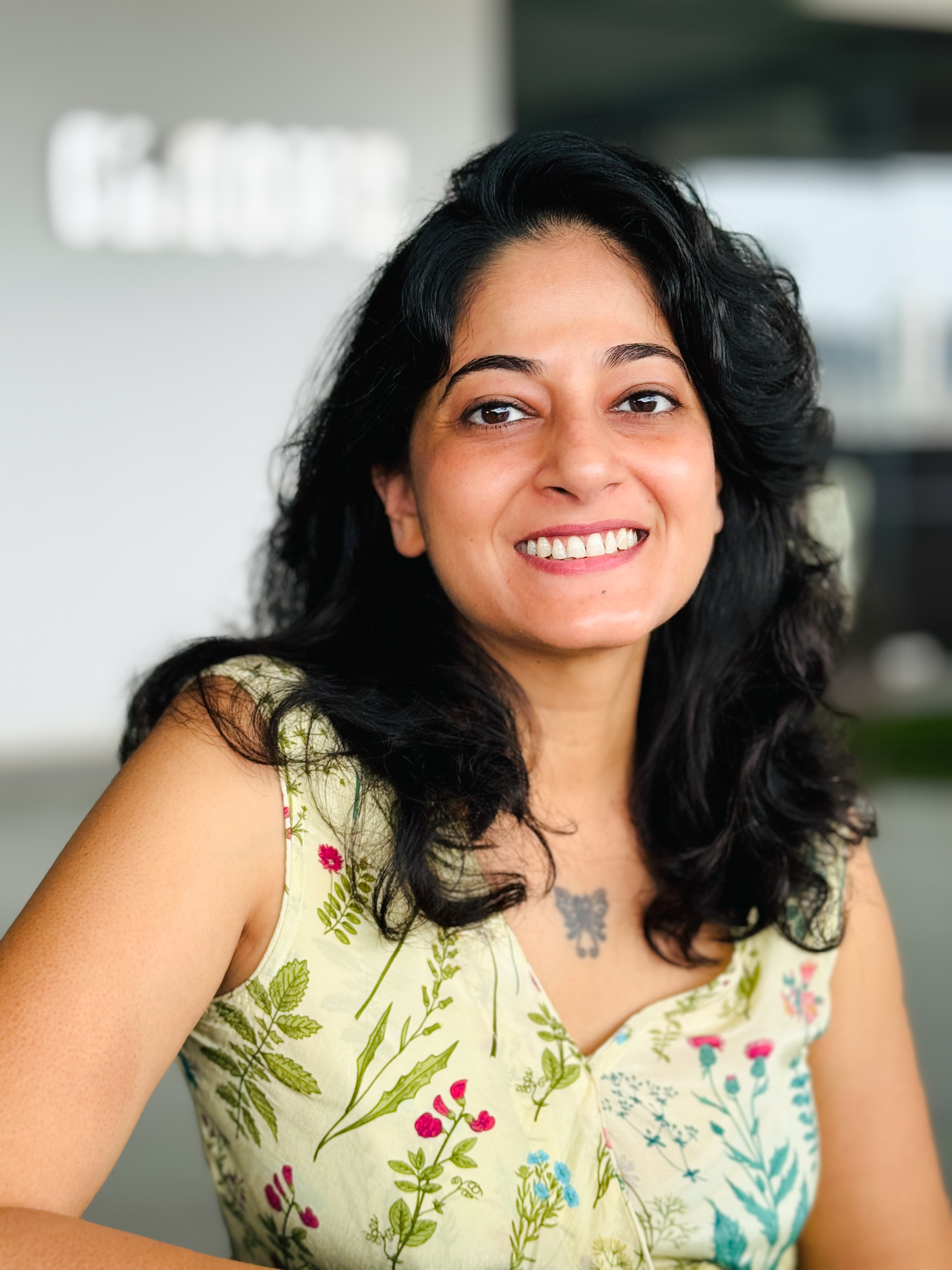
- Aleya Sen in 2024
- Occupations: director, producer, writer
- Years active: 2004–present

Aleya Sen is an Indian director, producer and writer of Bollywood films. She made her directorial and writing debut with the film Dil Juunglee (2018). She also produced the film Badhaai Ho in 2018.

== Career ==
Sen started her career as an assistant director under Pradeep Sarkar in Delhi. In 2004, Sen along Amit Sharma and Hemant Bhandari, established Chrome Pictures Pvt Ltd. a production house in Mumbai.

In 2018, Aleya co-produced the comedy drama Badhaai Ho, and made her debut as a director and script writer with Dil Juunglee. Her next film, Trial Period, was released in 2023.

She also served as a creative producer for Netflix's Lust Stories 2.

== Filmography ==
- Dil Juunglee (2018) (director)
- Badhaai Ho (2018) (producer)
- Trial Period (2023) (writer) (director)

== Awards ==
- Bronze Medal at the ‘Cannes Lion and gold at ‘Goa film festival’ for ‘THE SILENT NATIONAL ANTHEM’ in 2011.
