= List of ZEE5 original films =

ZEE5 is an Indian on-demand Internet streaming media provider run by Zee Entertainment Enterprises. It was launched in India on 14 February 2018 with content in 12 languages. The service has distributed a number of original programs, including original series, specials, miniseries, documentaries and films.

== Feature films ==
Key
†	Denotes films that have not yet been released

Year	Title	Genre	Premiere	Length	Language	Notes
2018	Toba Tek Singh	Drama	24 August 2018	73 mins	Hindi	
2018	AranyaDeb	Fantasy	8 October 2018	125 mins	Bengali	
2018	Tigers	Drama	13 November 2018	90 mins	Hindi	
2019	Sigai	Drama	9 January 2019	102 mins	Tamil	
2019	Cabaret	Thriller	9 January 2019	93 mins	Hindi	
2019	Veergati	Drama	26 January 2019	60 mins	Marathi	
2019	Kalavu	Crime thriller	9 February 2019	112 mins	Tamil	
2019	The Sholay Girl	Drama	3 March 2019	106 mins	Hindi	
2019	The Lovely Mrs. Mookherjee	Drama	15 March 2019	55 mins	Bengali	
2019	377 Ab Normal	Drama	19 March 2019	90 mins	Hindi	
2019	Yours Truly	Drama	3 May 2019	80 mins	Hindi	
2019	Badnaam Gali	Drama comedy	9 May 2019	95 mins	Hindi	
2019	7 no. Sanatan Sanyal	Drama	7 June 2019	90 mins	Bengali	
2019	Igloo	Drama	17 July 2019	138 mins	Tamil	
2019	Dhrusti	Crime thriller	25 July 2019	112 mins	Telugu	
2019	Barot House	Thriller	7 August 2019	92 mins	Hindi	
2019	Posham Pa	Psychological thriller	21 August 2019	75 mins	Hindi	
2019	Line of Descent (Note: The film had a simultaneous release in theaters and Video on demand in United states.)	Crime drama	20 December 2019	95 mins	Hindi; English (Note: Bilingual film)	
2019	Happi	Comedy drama	25 December 2019	135 mins	Hindi	
2020	Operation Parindey	Thriller	4 February 2020	60 mins	Hindi	
2020	Bamfaad	Drama	10 April 2020	102 mins	Hindi	
2020	Ateet	Drama	21 April 2020	129 mins	Hindi	
2020	Amrutharamam	Romantic drama	28 April 2020	115 mins	Telugu	
2020	Court Martial	Drama	6 May 2020	96 mins	Hindi	
2020	Ghoomketu	Comedy drama	22 May 2020	108 mins	Hindi	
2020	Mamakiki	Comedy	30 May 2020	97 mins	Tamil	
2020	Chintu Ka Birthday	Drama	5 June 2020	80 mins	Hindi	
2020	Yaadhumagi Nindraai	Drama	19 June 2020	106 mins	Tamil	
2020	Unlock - The Haunted App	Horror	27 June 2020	58 mins	Hindi	
2020	47 Days	Drama	30 June 2020	104 mins	Telugu	
2020	Cocktail	Comedy	10 July 2020	132 mins	Tamil	
2020	Virgin Bhanupriya	Comedy	16 July 2020	111 mins	Hindi	
2020	Yaara	Action thriller	30 July 2020	130 mins	Hindi	
2020	Meka Suri	Thriller	31 July 2020	86 mins	Telugu	
2020	Danny	Action	1 August 2020	95 mins	Tamil	
2020	Pareeksha	Drama	6 August 2020	102 mins	Hindi	
2020	Lock Up	Thriller	14 August 2020	106 mins	Tamil	
2020	Mee Raqsam	Drama	21 August 2020	95 mins	Hindi	
2020	Atkan Chatkan	Musical drama	5 September 2020	126 mins	Hindi	
2020	Tiki Taka	Sports drama	11 September 2020	104 mins	Bengali	
2020	London Confidential	Thriller	18 September 2020	77 mins	Hindi	
2020	Comedy Couple	Romantic comedy	21 October 2020	117 mins	Hindi	
2020	Taish	Thriller	29 October 2020	178 mins	Hindi	
2020	Meka Suri 2	Crime thriller	29 November 2020	86 mins	Telugu	
2020	Darbaan	Drama	4 December 2020	145 mins	Hindi	
2020	Oru Pakka Kathai	Romantic drama	25 December 2020	124 mins	Tamil	
2021	Nail Polish	Thriller	1 January 2021	128 mins	Hindi	
2021	Kaagaz	Biopic	7 January 2021	109 mins	Hindi	
2021	Lahore Confidential	Thriller	4 February 2021	77 mins	Hindi	
2021	The Wife	Horror	19 March 2021	106 mins	Hindi	
2021	Silence... Can You Hear It?	Thriller	26 March 2021	136 mins	Hindi	
2021	Mathil	Social drama	14 April 2021	104 mins	Tamil	
2021	Raat Baaki Hai	Suspense thriller	16 April 2021	89 mins	Hindi	
2021	Battala Ramaswamy Biopikku	Comedy drama	14 May 2021	136 mins	Telugu	
2021	Crrush	Adult comedy	9 July 2021	129 mins	Telugu	
2021	State of Siege: Temple Attack	Action thriller	9 July 2021	110 mins	Hindi	
2021	14 Phere	Comedy drama	23 July 2021	111 mins	Hindi	
2021	Dial 100	Thriller	6 August 2021	104 mins	Hindi	
2021	200 Halla Ho	Crime thriller	20 August 2021	115 mins	Hindi	
2021	Helmet	Comedy drama	3 September 2021	104 mins	Hindi	
2021	Kya Meri Sonam Gupta Bewafa Hai?	Comedy drama	10 September 2021	136 mins	Hindi	
2021	Dikkiloona	Si-Fi comedy	10 September 2021	144 mins	Tamil	
2021	Net	Thriller drama	10 September 2021	103 mins	Telugu	
2021	Alanti Sitralu	Adult drama	24 September 2021	141 mins	Telugu	
2021	Vinodhaya Sitham	Comedy drama	13 October 2021	97 mins	Tamil	
2021	Jinne Jamme Saare Nikkame	Comedy	14 October 2021	132 mins	Punjabi	
2021	Rashmi Rocket	Sports drama	15 October 2021	129 mins	Hindi	
2021	Heads and Tales	Suspense drama	22 October 2021	83 mins	Telugu	
2021	Aafat-E-Ishq	Black comedy	29 October 2021	114 mins	Hindi	
2021	Squad	Action thriller	12 November 2021	124 mins	Hindi	
2021	Bob Biswas	Crime thriller	3 December 2021	131 mins	Hindi	
2021	420 IPC	Suspense drama	17 December 2021	98 mins	Hindi	
2021	Blood Money	Family thriller	24 December 2021	89 mins	Tamil	
2021	Murder at Teesri Manzil 302	Murder mystery	31 December 2021	120 mins	Hindi	
2021	Waah Zindagi	Comedy drama	31 December 2021	107 mins	Hindi	
2022	Mudhal Nee Mudivum Nee	Coming-of-age film	21 January 2022	150 mins	Tamil	
2022	36 Farmhouse	Comedy drama	21 January 2022	107 mins	Hindi	
2022	Malli Modalaindi	Romantic drama	11 February 2022	126 mins	Telugu	
2022	Love Hostel	Crime thriller	25 February 2022	100 mins	Hindi	
2022	Kinnerasani	Mystery thriller	10 June 2022	129 mins	Telugu	
2022	Atithi Bhooto Bhava	Romantic comedy	23 September 2022	114 mins	Hindi	
2022	Tadka	Comedy drama	4 November 2022	115 mins	Hindi	
2022	India Lockdown	Drama	2 December 2022	112 mins	Hindi	
2022	Blurr	Horror thriller	9 December 2022	126 mins	Hindi	
2023	Chhatriwali	Romantic comedy	20 January 2023	116 mins	Hindi	
2023	Operation Fryday (Note: Originally titled Shooter, the film was stuck in development hell for more than a decade before finally releasing in 2023.)	Action	26 January 2023	135 mins	Hindi	
2023	Lost	Thriller	16 February 2023	124 mins	Hindi	
2023	Kanjoos Makhichoos	Comedy	24 March 2023	116 mins	Hindi	
2023	Mrs Undercover	Spy comedy	14 April 2023	107 mins	Hindi	
2023	U-Turn	Supernatural thriller	28 April 2023	101 mins	Hindi	
2023	Sirf Ek Bandaa Kaafi Hai	Courtroom drama	23 May 2023	132 mins	Hindi	
2023	Tarla	Biopic	7 July 2023	127 mins	Hindi	
2023	Haddi	Crime drama	7 September 2023	134 mins	Hindi	
2023	Prema Vimanam	Comedy	12 October 2023	146 mins	Telugu	
2023	Kadak Singh	Thriller	8 December 2023	128 mins	Hindi	
2023	Once Upon Two Times	Drama	23 December 2023	106 mins	Hindi	
2023	Safed	Drama	29 December 2023	69 mins	Hindi	
2024	Lantrani	Comedy drama	9 February 2024	99 mins	Hindi	
2024	Woh Bhi Din The	Comedy drama	30 March 2024	126 mins	Hindi	
2024	Silence 2: The Night Owl Bar Shootout	Thriller	16 April 2024	142 mins	Hindi	
2024	Kaam Chalu Hai	Drama	19 April 2024	82 mins	Hindi	
2024	House of Lies	Mystery crime	31 May 2024	88 mins	Hindi	
2024	Luv Ki Arrange Marriage	Romantic comedy	14 June 2024	120 mins	Hindi	
2024	Rautu Ka Raaz	Comedy crime drama	28 June 2024	115 mins	Hindi	
2024	Kakuda	Horror comedy	12 July 2024	116 mins	Hindi	
2024	Berlin	Spy thriller	13 September 2024	119 mins	Hindi	
2024	Love, Sitara	Romantic drama	27 September 2024	105 mins	Hindi	
2024	Despatch	Crime drama	13 December 2024	151 mins	Hindi	
2025	Hisaab Barabar	Crime drama	24 January 2025	112 mins	Hindi	
2025	Mrs.	Drama	7 February 2025	111 mins	Hindi	
2025	Logout	Thriller drama	18 April 2025	108 mins	Hindi	
2025	Costao	Crime drama	1 May 2025	124 mins	Hindi	
2025	Interrogation	Suspense crime thriller	20 May 2025	95 mins	Hindi	
2025	Detective Sherdil	Mystery thriller	20 June 2025	106 mins	Hindi	
2025	Kaalidhar Laapata	Drama	4 July 2025	109 mins	Hindi	
2025	Tehran	Action thriller	14 August 2025	116 mins	Hindi	
2025	Bhagwat: Chapter One – Raakshas	Crime thriller	17 October 2025	127 mins	Hindi	
2025	Saali Mohabbat	Drama	12 December 2025	116 mins	Hindi	
2026	Satluj	Biographical drama	3 July 2026	163 mins	Hindi	
2026	Frame	Social drama	10 July 2026	115 mins	Marathi	
2026	Nibba Nibbi	Dark romantic-comedy	14 August 2026	122 mins	Bengali	
2026	Ghamasaan	Action drama	11 September 2026	150 mins	Hindi	
2026	Adkitta	Family drama	11 September 2026	126 mins	Marathi	
2026	Pooja Meri Jaan	Psychological thriller	2 October 2026	117 mins	Hindi	
2026	Sumo Didi	Sports biography	23 October 2026	118 mins	Hindi	
2026	Nooru Kodi Vaanavil	Romantic drama	6 November 2026	144 mins	Tamil	
2026	Mrigaya 1.5: The Hunt Continues	Crime thriller	13 November 2026	114 mins	Bengali	
2026	Srimathi (2026)	Drama	4 December 2026	TBA	Telugu	
2026	Dalimb (2026)	Psychological thriller	4 December 2026	TBA	Hindi	

== Zee Plex ==
On 2 October 2020, Zee launched a PVOD and Pay-per-view service called Zee Plex for its streaming service ZEE5, and various DTH services in India.

=== Indian ===
Year	Title	Genre	Premiere	Length	Language	Notes	Ref(s)
2020	Ka Pae Ranasingam	Political drama	2 October 2020	176 mins	Tamil		
2020	Khaali Peeli	Romantic action	2 October 2020	120 mins	Hindi		
2021	The Power	Action thriller	14 January 2021	155 mins	Hindi		
2021	Basta	Comedy	29 January 2021	120 mins	Marathi		
2021	Ninnila Ninnila	Romantic comedy	26 February 2021	118 mins	Telugu		
2021	Sita: On The Road	Drama	5 March 2021	115 mins	Telugu		
2021	Avwanchhit	Drama	9 March 2021	118 mins	Marathi		
2021	Radhe	Action thriller	13 May 2021	114 mins	Hindi		

=== International ===
Year	Title	Genre	Premiere	Length	Language	Notes
2020	Unhinged	Psychological thriller	13 November 2020	93 mins	English	

== Short films ==
Year	Title	Genre	Premiere	Length	Language	Notes
2018	Khaar	Docu-drama	10 February 2018	30 mins	Hindi	
2018	Mehmaan	Thriller	14 February 2018	21 mins	Bengali	
2018	Mehram	Drama	21 August 2018	33 mins	Hindi	
2018	Sone Bhi Do Yaaron	Comedy	14 February 2018	10 mins	Hindi	
2018	Tamashree	Drama	14 February 2018	10 mins	Hindi	
2018	Lal Bahadur Shastri's Death	Mystery	15 August 2018	15 mins	Hindi	
2018	Toothbrush	Drama	21 December 2018	20 mins	Hindi	
2019	Fatafat	Drama	4 January 2019	15 mins	Hindi	
2019	Dhaaga	Drama	10 January 2019	20 mins	Marathi	
2019	Khoj	Drama	13 January 2019	28 mins	Punjabi	
2019	Moh	Drama	4 March 2019	15 mins	Hindi	
2019	D.A.T.E.	Drama	12 May 2019	13 mins	Hindi	
