= Khaali Peeli =

Indian drama film

- Release poster
- Directed by: Maqbool Khan
- Written by: Yash Keswani; Sima Agarwal
- Produced by: Ali Abbas Zafar; Himanshu Kishan Mehra; Abhishek Vyas
- Starring: Ishaan Khatter; Ananya Panday; Jaideep Ahlawat
- Cinematography: Adil Afsar
- Edited by: Rameshwar S. Bhagat
- Music by: Songs: Vishal–Shekhar; Score: Sanchit Balhara and Ankit Balhara
- Production companies: Zee Studios; Offside Entertainment
- Distributed by: Zee Plex; ZEE5
- Release date: 2 October 2020
- Running time: 120 minutes
- Country: India
- Language: Hindi

Khaali Peeli is a 2020 Indian Hindi-language masala film directed by Maqbool Khan, written by Yash Keswani & Sima Agarwal and produced by Ali Abbas Zafar, Zee Studios and Offside Entertainment. The film stars Ishaan Khatter, Ananya Panday, and Jaideep Ahlawat in the lead roles.

Principal photography began on 11 September 2019 and shooting wrapped up in March 2020. The film's initial release on 12 June 2020 was postponed due to COVID-19 pandemic.

Khaali Peeli was released digitally on Zee Plex with pay-per-view model on 2 October 2020.

== Plot ==
Set in 2007, the story is about two childhood sweethearts, Pooja (Ananya Panday) and Blackie (Ishaan Khatter), who get separated due to certain circumstances when they were kids. Blackie, born Vijay, has had a criminal mind since childhood when he planned a jewellery heist with his father, but was caught by the police. Blackie is able to escape and has constantly been on the run.

Blackie is a taxi driver who has agreed to drop a pregnant lady off at the hospital (for INR 5000) during the city-wide taxi strike. He is confronted by the union leader and 2 other drivers, and in the melee, he stabs one of the drivers in the stomach. Pooja, who is a prostitute (& is to be married to a long-term client of hers, Choksi Seth (Swanand Kirkire), who has fallen in love with her), decides to escape the brothel on turning 18, with a bag full of stolen money. She bumps into Blackie, who is on the run from the police, and his taxi accidentally collides.

He agrees to "drive" her to freedom (as she is being pursued by goons), in exchange for a hefty amount (Rs 15,000). When he finds out that she is running with a bag full of money, he raises his fee to Rs 25,000. Khala (Vaishali Thakkar) is Pooja's madam and is in a soup with don Yusuf Chikna (Jaideep Ahlawat), who owns the brothel. Yusuf kills Khala.

Ten years ago, Yusuf had taken Blackie under his wing, and he first met Pooja (when she was still a child) at the brothel. He was named Blackie as he used to sell cinema tickets in black for Yusuf as his start in the criminal underworld. Choksi saw Pooja at the cinema and fell in love with her. He promised Yusuf to bear all expenses for Pooja, with the intention of having her when she turns 18.

Inspector Tawde (Zakir Hussain) gets suspicious of Blackie in a taxi during the strike, with a customer. When his and Pooja's story won't match, he asks Blackie to drop him off at home on his way to the station. In the car, he gets info on a taxi driver who stabbed a union leader and a girl who robbed a jewellery store. Tawde asks Pooja to open the bag, and she draws a gun on him. Tawde is forced out of the cab without his gun. Tawde reaches a police station and orders a search for the cab and learns that the cab is registered to Vijay Chauhan. This info reaches Yusuf, who now knows that Blackie is driving Pooja out of Mumbai. Blackie has had a crush on Pooja since childhood, which Yusuf crushed as Yusuf had promised her to Choksi. Blackie defies Yusuf and continues to meet Pooja, and when Yusuf finds out, he beats up Blackie badly, and Pooja is sent to boarding school.

Meanwhile, Blackie wants a 50% cut from Pooja. Blackie wants to run away with the money, but gets a call from Yusuf's goon, who offers to double the money in the bag in exchange for Pooja. Blackie doesn't know that the offer was from Yusuf. Blackie takes Pooja for a fair and calls the goon to the location to take delivery of Pooja. Meanwhile, Tawde tracks Blackie and reaches the same fair. This is when Pooja realises that Blackie is her friend Blackie from childhood and tells him that she is Pooja. Blackie understands but still does the deal and hands over Pooja to Yusuf's goons. Pooja escapes from the goons and hitches a bus ride on her way out of Mumbai. Blackie has a change of heart and goes after Pooja, but realises at the fair that she has escaped. He tracks her, and so do Yusuf's goons.

Blackie gets himself arrested by Inspector Bhim Singh (Satish Kaushik), and Bhim informs Tawde that he has captured the taxi driver, but the girl is missing. Meanwhile, the bus stops at a dhaba where Yusuf's goons are having dinner. Pooja runs into them and hides while a customer calls the police, which goes to the station where Bhim Singh is in charge. Blackie kidnaps and tries to bribe Bhim Singh. Yusuf, with 2 bags of money, to help him save Pooja. As Blackie tricks Bhim Singh as he escapes with his car and the money, Yusuf's men capture Pooja and take her to Yusuf. Blackie attacks the goons before they reach Yusuf and rescues Pooja. Blackie challenges Yusuf on the phone for Pooja. Pooja and Blackie kiss.

Yusuf captures Blackie's dad and calls Blackie a corrupt cop, and takes him to his location with Pooja for an exchange. Blackie knows he is dead in every scenario, so he calls Tawde for a meeting and agrees to get Yusuf in exchange for his and Pooja's freedom. Blackie decides to lure Yusuf. Out and Tawde and his force arrest him. Yusuf's gang counterattacks, and Yusuf escapes with Pooja. The enraged Blackie follows and intercepts them. A fight ensues, and Yusuf gains the upper hand. He is about to shoot Blackie, when Tawde intervenes and kills Yusuf. Tawde is awarded a medal, and Blackie is sentenced to two years in jail. Pooja meets him outside the jail when his imprisonment ends.

== Cast ==
- Ishaan Khatter as Vijay "Blackie" Chauhan
  - Vedant Desaai as Young Vijay a.k.a. Blackie
- Ananya Panday as Pooja Gaur
  - Deshna Duggad as Young Pooja
- Jaideep Ahlawat as Yusuf Chikna
- Zakir Hussain as Inspector Tawde
- Satish Kaushik as Inspector Bhim Singh
- Swanand Kirkire as Choksi Seth
- Suyash Tilak as Mangesh
- Anup Soni as Ravi / Babuji
- Kabir Duhan Singh as Goon
- Bhushan Vikas as Mahesh
- Vinod Nahardih as Mannu
- Purnanand Wandekar as Jaidev
- Vaishali Thakkar as Khala

== Soundtrack ==
Khaali Peeli

Soundtrack album by Vishal–Shekhar
- Released: 15 September 2020
- Recorded: 2019
- Genre: Feature film soundtrack
- Length: 10:25
- Language: Hindi
- Label: Zee Music Company

Vishal–Shekhar chronology
Baaghi 3 (2020)	Khaali Peeli (2020)	Chehre (2021)

Official audio
- Khaali Peeli - Full Album on YouTube

The film's music was composed by Vishal–Shekhar, while lyrics were written by Kumaar and Raj Shekhar.

The song "Beyonce Sharma Jaayegi" was criticised online for lyrics that some found racist. On 13 September, the producers changed the spelling of the title, from "Beyoncé" to "Beyonse". News18 India reported that Jay-Z trademarked and protected the name "Beyoncé" and it therefore cannot be used without their permission. The title was subsequently changed again, to "Duniya Sharma Jayegi". However, despite the name change, the video received 1 million dislikes within its first week on YouTube.

All music is composed by Vishal–Shekhar.

Track listing
No.	Title	Lyrics	Singer(s)	Length
1.	"Duniya Sharma Jaayegi" (previously "Beyonce Sharma Jaayegi" and "Beyonse Sharma Jaayegi")	Kumaar, Raj Shekhar	Nakash Aziz, Neeti Mohan	3:32
2.	"Tehas Nehas"	Kumaar	Shekhar Ravjiani, Prakriti Kakar	3:55
3.	"Shana Dil"	Raj Shekhar	Divya Kumar	2:58
Total length:				10:25

== Release ==
Khaali Peeli was originally scheduled to be released worldwide on 11 June 2020 in cinemas, before the COVID-19 pandemic led to its postponement owing to cinemas shutdown. In August 2020, the makers sold its rights to new PVOD platform Zee Plex. Khaali Peeli was released there on 2 October 2020, coinciding with Gandhi Jayanti. It was simultaneously released in drive-in theatres of Gurugram and Bengaluru.

== Reception ==
On the review aggregator website Rotten Tomatoes, 40% of 10 critics' reviews are positive, with an average rating of 4/10.

Devansh Sharma from Firstpost wrote, "After Beyond the Clouds and Dhadak, Khatter puts on display yet another side of his multifaceted personality. Khaali Peeli is his most 'commercial' film yet, à la Ranveer Singh in Rohit Shetty's Simmba. But rather than mimicking his idols, Khatter invents his style in conformity with a Mumbai taxi driver on a steady diet of Bollywood films for years — and makes a meal of it." Soumya Srivastava from Hindustan Times stated, "Khaali Peeli is a concoction that can only be brewed in the belly of Bollywood. With one chase sequence following on the tails of another, director Maqbool Khan ensures not a single moment is without its adrenaline dialled up to an 11. But it’s quite shocking how easily one can grow bored of craziness as well."

Shubhra Gupta from The Indian Express said, "Khaali Peeli knows that it needs to refresh the tropes it is up against, and manages to do so only some of the time in its two-hour duration." Uma Ramasubramanian from Mid-Day wrote, "Khaali Peeli is the perfect package for Khatter, who gets to showcase his dancing skills, action, drama, romance, comedy and biceps. Known for his love for offbeat films — Majid Majidi's Beyond the Clouds (2017) and forthcoming A Suitable Boy (2020) — the wonder boy is equally crackling in a typical Bollywood entertainer. Panday, though she carries the role efficiently, doesn't deliver authenticity to the character."

== Controversy ==
The song "Beyonce Sharma Jaayegi" was criticised online for lyrics that were found racist. The song has been contrasted with American singer Beyoncé's "Brown Skin Girl", as Rolling Stone India pointed out how on one hand, Beyoncé is working towards the racial empowerment through her song, but the Bollywood song names her, and says she will be "embarrassed of fairskinned Ananya Panday's dancing skills". HuffPost India wrote "What's a bit of racism sprinkled over the regular dose of sexism". News18 said, "It seems despite the Black Lives Matter movement, the hashtags and the social media outrage, Bollywood hasn't learned much about racism". After receiving heavy backlash online, the film's director Maqbool Khan apologised. On 13 September, the producers changed the spelling of the title, from "Beyoncé" to "Beyonse". News18 reported that Beyoncé's spouse, American rapper Jay-Z trademarked and protected the name "Beyoncé" and it therefore cannot be used without their permission. The title was subsequently changed, again, to "Duniya Sharma Jayegi". However, despite the name change, the video received 1 million dislikes within its first week on YouTube.
