= Ali Abbas Zafar =

Indian filmmaker (born 1982)

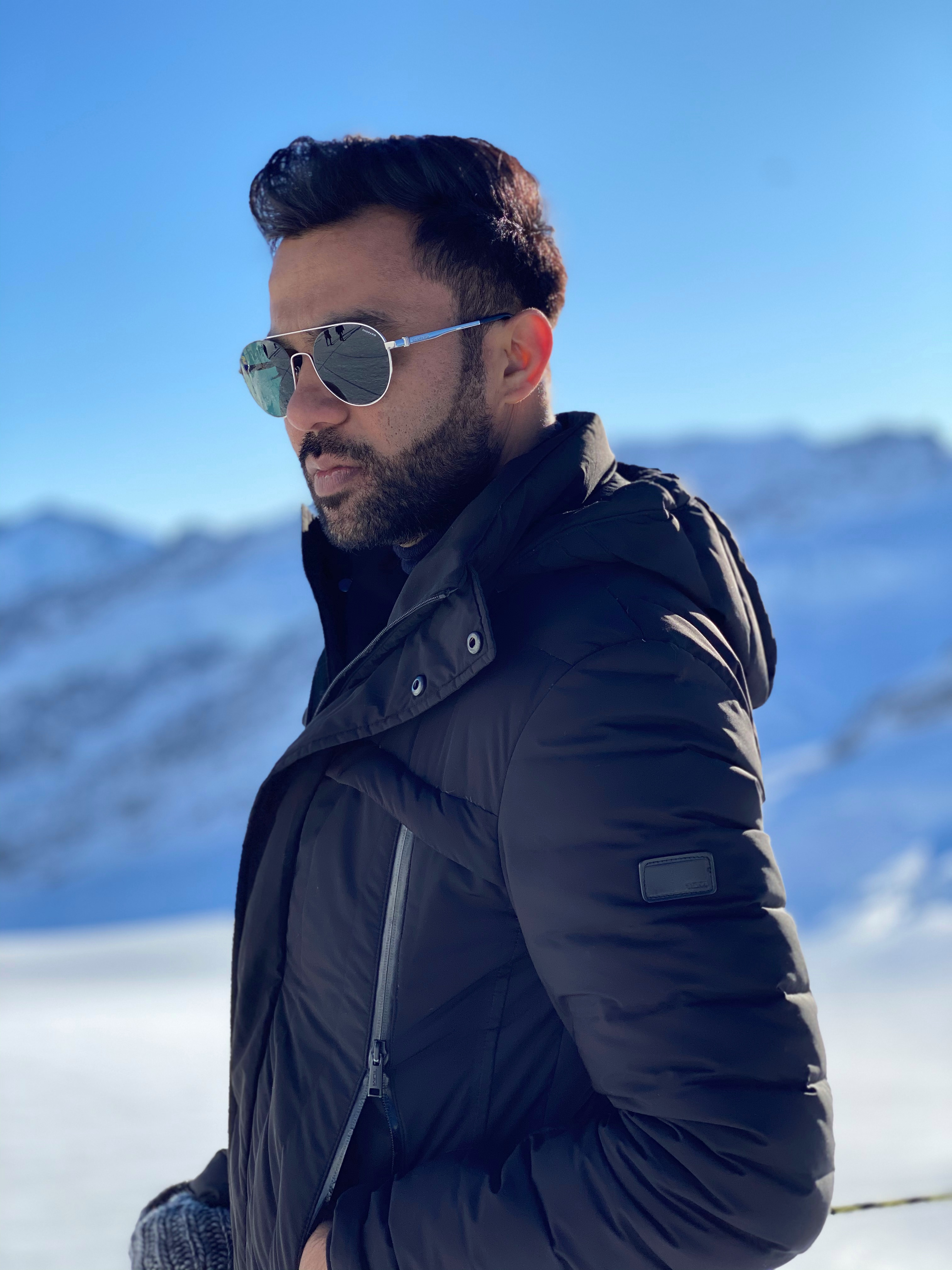
- Zafar in 2020
- Education: Kirori Mal College
- Occupations: Film director; producer; screenwriter
- Years active: 2007–present
- Spouse: Alicia Zafar (m. 2021)

Ali Abbas Zafar is an Indian film director, producer and screenwriter. He is known for directing Sultan (2016) and Tiger Zinda Hai (2017).

== Personal life ==
Zafar is a graduate of Kirori Mal College, New Delhi. He married Alicia Zafar, an Iranian based in France, on 4 January 2021.

== Career ==
Zafar entered the film industry as an assistant director, with multiple projects for the production company Yash Raj Films (YRF). He then made his own directorial and screen-writing debut with the romantic comedy Mere Brother Ki Dulhan (2011). The film revolved around a young man (Imran Khan) who finds a bride (Katrina Kaif) for his elder brother (Ali Zafar), but then finds that he himself has fallen in love with her.

His next film was the action drama Gunday (2014), set in Calcutta in the 1970s and 1980s. The film starred Ranveer Singh and Arjun Kapoor as powerful bandits, Priyanka Chopra as a cabaret dancer whom they both fall in love with, and Irrfan Khan as a police officer pursuing them. Gunday received mostly positive reviews from critics.

Zafar's next film was the sports drama Sultan (2016) starring Salman Khan as a wrestling champion from Haryana, with Anushka Sharma as a female wrestler who becomes a love interest for Khan's character. The film received positive reviews from critics and emerged as one of the highest-grossing Indian films.

His next film was the action thriller Tiger Zinda Hai (2017), the sequel to YRF's Ek Tha Tiger (2012). The film stars Salman Khan as a RAW agent and Katrina Kaif as an ISI spy reprising their roles from the first film and is about the both of them accepting a rescue mission to free 40 nurses, 25 Indian and 15 Pakistani, from a ruthless militant. The film released in December 2017 and received generally positive reviews from critics, and became a major commercial success emerging as the highest-grossing films of the year and one of the highest-grossing Indian films.

In May 2018, he began pre-production of the film Bharat. The trailer of this film was released on 22 April 2019 and it released on 5 June for Eid. It stars Salman Khan, Zafar's third collaboration with the actor, alongside Katrina Kaif, Disha Patani, Sunil Grover and Tabu, and is an official adaptation of the Korean film, Ode to My Father. It was also a major commercial success.

In 2020, Zafar made his debut as the producer for Khaali Peeli, an action-comedy directed by debutante Maqbool Khan that starred Ishaan Khatter and Ananya Pandey in lead roles.

Zafar's next three projects were OTT releases. First was the web series Tandav for Amazon Prime, a political drama starring Saif Ali Khan alongside Dimple Kapadia, Sunil Grover, Kumud Mishra, Tigmanshu Dhulia, Mohammed Zeeshan Ayyub, and others. It was released on 15 January 2021. On 16 September 2022 came the Diljit Dosanjh starrer Jogi about the 1984 anti-Sikh riots, which released on Netflix. It received mixed to positive reviews, with praise for the depiction of the riots but criticism for the screenplay. On 9 June 2023, his next film Bloody Daddy released on JioCinema. This action thriller film starring Shahid Kapoor also received mixed to positive reviews.

Zafar's next project was the sci-fi action film Bade Miyan Chote Miyan with Akshay Kumar and Tiger Shroff, produced by Jackky Bhagnani under Pooja Entertainment. It was released on 11 April 2024, coinciding with Eid. However, the film was a critical and commercial disaster.

Zafar's next directorial venture will be the romantic action thriller Beparwah, which will mark his first collaboration with Yash Raj Films since Tiger Zinda Hai. The film will feature Ahaan Panday as the lead, with Sharvari, Aaishvary Thackeray, Bobby Deol and Jimmy Shergill in pivotal roles.

== Filmography ==
=== Films ===
List of Ali Abbas Zafar film credits
Year	Title	Director	Writer	Producer	Notes	Ref.
2007	Marigold	No	No	No	Assistant director	
2007	Jhoom Barabar Jhoom	No	No	No	Assistant director	
2008	Tashan	No	No	No	Assistant director	
2009	New York	No	No	No	Assistant director	
2010	Badmaash Company	No	No	No	Assistant director	
2011	Mere Brother Ki Dulhan	Yes	Yes	No		
2014	Gunday	Yes	Yes	No		
2016	Sultan	Yes	Yes	No		
2017	Tiger Zinda Hai	Yes	Yes	No		
2019	Bharat	Yes	Yes	No		
2020	Khaali Peeli	No	No	Yes		
2022	Jogi	Yes	Yes	Yes		
2023	Bloody Daddy	Yes	Yes	Yes		
2024	Bade Miyan Chote Miyan	Yes	Yes	Yes	Also narrator	
2025	Detective Sherdil	No	Yes	Yes		
2026	Parivarik ManuRanjan	No	Yes	Yes		
2027	Beparwah	Yes	Yes	No		

=== Series ===
List of Ali Abbas Zafar series credits
Year	Title	Director	Writer	Producer	Ref.
2021	Tandav	Yes	Yes	No	

== Awards and nominations ==
List of Ali Abbas Zafar awards and nominations
Film	Award	Category	Result	Ref.
Mere Brother Ki Dulhan	Stardust Awards	Best Debut Director	Won	
Sultan	Stardust Awards	Best Director	Nominated	
Sultan	62nd Filmfare Awards	Best Director	Nominated	
Sultan	Tehran International Sports Film Festival	Best Director	Won	
Sultan	Zee Cine Awards	Best Director	Nominated	
Sultan	Zee Cine Awards	Best Story	Nominated	
