= Malavika Mohanan =

Indian actress and model (born 1993)

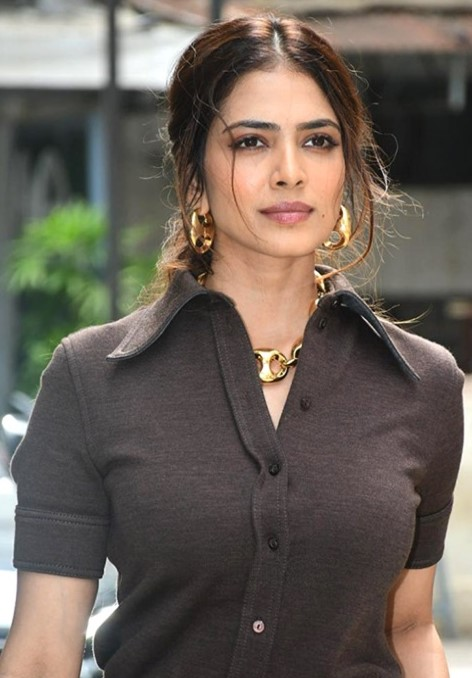
- Malavika in 2025
- Born: 4 August 1993 (age 33); Payyanur, Kerala, India
- Education: Wilson College, Mumbai
- Occupation: Actress
- Years active: 2013–present
- Father: K. U. Mohanan

Malavika Mohanan (born 4 August 1993) is an Indian actress who works predominantly in Tamil and Malayalam films. The daughter of cinematographer K. U. Mohanan, she made her acting debut in the Malayalam film Pattam Pole (2013). She gained praise for her starring role in Majid Majidi's Hindi film Beyond the Clouds (2017). She has since starred in several Malayalam and Tamil films including The Great Father (2017), Petta (2019), Master (2021) and Hridayapoorvam (2025).

== Early life ==
Malavika Mohanan was born 4 August 1993 and is the daughter of cinematographer K. U. Mohanan. She was born in the town of Payyanur in Kannur district of Kerala and grew up in Mumbai.

== Career ==
=== 2013–2017: Early work ===
Malavika completed a degree in Mass Media at Wilson College, Mumbai, hoping to emulate her father as a cinematographer or as a director. Post her graduation, while she was contemplating taking up higher studies, she accompanied her father to a commercial shoot for a fairness cream, starring Mammootty. Mammootty subsequently enquired about Malavika's interest in acting, before offering her a role opposite his son, Dulquer Salmaan, in an upcoming Malayalam film. She took time to consider the proposal before passing an audition and accepting terms to star in Pattam Pole (2013), and gradually learned about the process of acting as the shoot progressed. Owing to the original costume designer's illness, she also worked as her own designer for the project. The romantic drama film, which narrated the relationship between a Tamil Brahmin youth and a Christian girl, received mixed reviews and did not perform well at the box office. A critic from Rediff.com noted that Malavika's "peppy girl act is far from being perfect but shows promise", while the Times of India's reviewers suggested that she did a "decent job". During the period, she continued having an interest in fashion, setting up an Indian ethnic fusion fashion blog called "The Scarlet Window".

In her second film, Nirnayakam (2015), she portrayed a ballet dancer, won good reviews but also met with a tepid response commercially. A critic from Sify wrote that she " has nothing much to do other than to look pretty". Another film during the period, Naale opposite Fahadh Faasil, saw her portray a tribal girl but was later dropped midway through production. In 2016, Mohanan worked on her first Kannada film, Naanu Mattu Varalakshmi (2016) opposite a debutant Prithvi. Despite having a low-key release at the box office, the film won good reviews with Malavika's portrayal of the titular role of Varalakshmi being praised by critics. She then featured in the role of a police officer in the crime thriller The Great Father (2017), where she starred alongside an ensemble cast including Mammootty, Arya and Sneha. The film opened to positive reviews and performed well at the box office.

=== 2017–present: Beyond the Clouds and further expansion ===
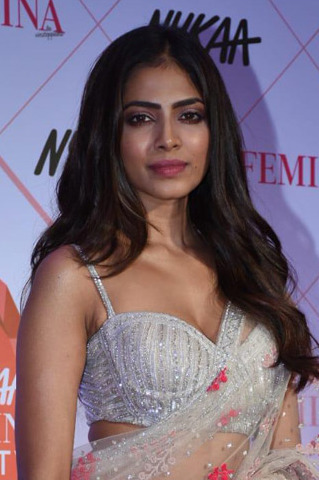
Malavika in 2020

Malavika's breakthrough as an actress came in her Hindi debut, Majid Majidi's drama film Beyond the Clouds (2017). She played Tara, a poor girl from Mumbai's Dhobi Ghat area. Following her successful audition, Majidi selected her ahead of Deepika Padukone and Kangana Ranaut for the role, which saw her portray the older sister of debutant Ishaan Khatter. She expressed her delight at working with Majidi so early in her career, especially considering that she regularly had to study and write essays on his films during her undergraduate course. For the film, she lost eight kilograms in fifteen days to film for a jail sequence, and opted not to wash her hair for several days on end to get the look of the slum dweller correct. The film was screened across several international festivals, before being released worldwide in April 2018. Malavika won positive reviews for her portrayal, with Filmfare's critic stating "Malavika Mohanan is a natural in front of the camera". A reviewer from The Times of India stated she was "captivating in her honest portrayal" and "skilfully walks the fine line between passionate and melodramatic", while The Hollywood Reporter called her "solid".

Malavika then appeared in three Tamil language films. Her Tamil debut was Karthik Subbaraj's Petta (2019), which would feature her alongside an ensemble cast including Rajinikanth, Vijay Sethupathi and Nawazuddin Siddiqui. She hired a Tamil-speaking tutor to help her practice her lines. She then went on to appear in the Tamil action thriller film Master (2021) alongside Vijay, in which she played the role of Charulatha, a college lecturer. The film was a commercial success, and became the highest-grossing film in her career. In 2022, she appeared in Maaran, opposite Dhanush. The film was released directly on Disney+ Hotstar, and received negative reviews from critics and the audience.

Malavika's only 2023 release was the Malayalam romantic drama Christy. Her next release was Pa. Ranjith's Tamil film Thangalaan, a historical action fantasy starring Vikram. It was initially slated for a January 2024 Pongal release, but was delayed to 15 August for Independence Day. Her next release is the Hindi action thriller Yudhra opposite Siddhant Chaturvedi, slated for a 20 September 2024 release. She played as a Mumbai-based architect Haritha, in Hridayapoorvam, opposite to Mohanlal. The film received positive reviews and is currently the fourth highest-grossing Malayalam film of 2025 and 13th highest-grossing Malayalam films of all time. Avinash Ramachandran of Cinema Express praised her performance and wrote, "a revelation to the film, and it goes on to show that the right character, under the aegis of a brilliant filmmaker, can change our beliefs about certain actors' histrionic abilities.". She is also set to make her Telugu debut in the Prabhas starrer The RajaSaab, a horror comedy.

== Media image ==
Malavika in 2024

In Chennai Times 30 Most Desirable Women list, Malavika was placed 5th in 2019 and 2nd in 2020. In the Times 50 Most Desirable Women list, she was placed 39th in 2018, 19th in 2019 and 29th in 2020.

== Filmography ==
Key
†	Denotes films that have not yet been released

=== Films ===
Year	Title	Role	Language	Notes	Ref.
2013	Pattam Pole	Riya	Malayalam		
2015	Nirnayakam	Saral	Malayalam		
2016	Naanu Mattu Varalakshmi	Varalakshmi	Kannada		
2017	Beyond the Clouds	Tara Neshan	Hindi		
2017	The Great Father	Inspector Meera	Malayalam		
2019	Petta	Poongodi	Tamil		
2021	Master	Charulatha "Charu" Prasad	Tamil		
2022	Maaran	Thara	Tamil		
2023	Christy	Christy Joseph	Malayalam		
2024	Thangalaan	Aarathi	Tamil		
2024	Yudhra	Nikhat Siddiqui	Hindi		
2025	Hridayapoorvam	Haritha Ravindranath	Malayalam		
2026	The RajaSaab	Bhairavi	Telugu		
2026	Idhayam Murali	Adhithi	Tamil	Cameo appearance	
2026	Sardar 2	Agent Zara	Tamil		
2026	Pocket Novel †	TBA	Tamil	Filming	

=== Television ===
Year	Title	Role	Platform	Language	Ref.
2020	Masaba Masaba	Herself	Netflix	English	

=== Music video ===
Year	Song	Singer	Note(s)	Ref.
2022	"Tauba"	Payal Dev, Badshah	Apni Dhun	

== Awards and nominations ==
Year	Award	Category	Film	Result	Ref.
2019	Asiavision Awards	Acting Sensation of the Year	Beyond the Clouds	Won	
2022	South Indian International Movie Awards	Best Female Debut – Tamil	Master	Nominated	
2022	Edison Awards	Favourite Actress	Master	Nominated	
