= Parivarik ManuRanjan =

2026 Indian film

- Film Poster
- Directed by: Varun V. Sharma
- Written by: Varun V. Sharma; Brijendra Kala; Ali Abbas Zafar
- Produced by: Vinod Bhanushali; Kamlesh Bhanushali; Himanshu Kishan Mehra; Alicia Zafar
- Starring: Pankaj Tripathi; Aditi Rao Hydari; Brijendra Kala; Sunita Rajwar
- Cinematography: Anup Singh
- Music by: Joel Crasto
- Production companies: Bhanushali Studios Limited; AAZ Films
- Distributed by: SonyLIV
- Release date: 13 November 2026
- Running time: 114 minutes
- Country: India
- Language: Hindi

Parvarik ManuRanjan is a 2026 Indian Hindi-language comedy drama film directed by Varun V. Sharma. starring Pankaj Tripathi and Aditi Rao Hydari in the lead roles. It premiered on Sony LIV on 13 November 2026.

== Plot ==
Ranjan Dubey (Pankaj Tripathi), a 40-year-old unmarried man, lives alone in his ancestral mansion in Lucknow after fulfilling his family responsibilities by getting his sisters married. His family, neighbors, and colleagues encourage him to find a wife. At the behest of his neighbour and co-worker, he meets many eligible matches, only to find himself repelled by the thought of marriage. Following a suggestion to hire someone to manage his household, his co-worker publishes a video advertisement inviting maids to show up to manage Ranjan's household. The very next morning a beautiful young woman 'Helen' shows up at Ranjan's doorstep. Ranjan employs Helen (Aditi Rao Hydari), who gradually brings changes to his otherwise monotonous life alone. Ranjan finds his house better managed and his life in order after Helen joins in. The presence of a attractive young woman in the household sparks a lot of gossip and rumors around the neighborhood and at Ranjan's office. Ranjan finds himself attracted to Helen and starts to feel protective of her at events when the neighbors try to pry upon her. He even goes on to defend her as being a guest at his own sister's function when she expects Helen to work tirelessly to cater her guests despite her own servants. This sparks a wave of tension and turmoil in the minds of the relatives including Ranjan's sisters looking at the growing protectiveness and affinity of Ranjan towards Helen. One fine day police arrive at Ranjan's doorstep to arrest Helen. It is later revealed that Helen is not really a maid but comes from a respectable family. The story follows their relationship, the social expectations surrounding marriage, and the circumstances behind Helen's arrival, ending as they settle down together despite social criticism.

== Cast ==
- Pankaj Tripathi as Ranjan Dubey
- Aditi Rao Hydari as Helen/Manu Joshi
- Brijendra Kala as Rajaram Pandey
- Sunita Rajwar as Tamanna Pandey
- Vijayant Kohli as Harishankar
- Mukesh Tiwari as Bhoop Singh
- Neelu Dogra as Babita Didi
- Kumar Saurabh as Chaurasiya
- Simran Awasthi as Babli
- Akanksha Pandey as ASI Naseem
- Jyoti Pandey as SI Jyoti Kumari
- Ghanshyam Garg as Ghannu Ji
- Amresh Aryan as Khanna Ji
- Neeraj Sharma as Siddiqui Ji
- Suyashi Mishra as Pinki
- Pradeept Mani Tripathi as Pinki's husband

== Production ==
=== Development ===
Parivarik ManuRanjan was developed as the first film under a three-film collaboration between Bhanushali Studios Limited and AAZ Films. Directed by Varun V. Sharma, the film was produced by Vinod Bhanushali and Himanshu Mehra. Sharma and Brijendra Kala wrote the screenplay, with Zafar as a creative producer.

According to Sharma, the film's title originated during discussions with Kala while they were developing the screenplay. The name for the male lead was already chosen to be "Ranjan", and during Sharma's discussions with Kala during development, they found the script entertaining enough that eventually the film's initial title was decided to be called Parivarik Manoranjan, as the plot centered around families and the neighborhood. From their discussions, they settled on naming the female lead "Manu", and retitling the film Parivarik ManuRanjan, both conveying the phrase "family entertainmnet" and inlcuding the names of the main protagonists. Sharma said that he drew inspirations from the works of Hrishikesh Mukherjee and Basu Chatterjee, where the world and its characters and conflicts were simple with no major complications.

=== Casting ===
Pankaj Tripathi and Aditi Rao Hydari were cast in the lead roles, marking their first on-screen collaboration.

Sharma stated that casting Tripathi as Ranjan was a unanimous decision during a script discussion with Brijdendra Kala, Ali Abbas Zafar and Himanshu Mehra. Having previously worked with Tripathi, Sharma approached him with the screenplay, which Tripathi accepted after reading it.

Sharma also stated that for discussions on casting Manu, Zafar suggested Hydari as makers wanted to establish a sense of mystery around someone who just arrived and how they adjust to the new surroundings.

Tripathi liked the script for its emotional humor and art, stating, “There was something so charmingly simple and yet irresistibly funny about the script that I couldn’t say no,"; while Hydari found the script heartwarming, stating "When I read the script, I smiled through it. For me it’s rare to come across a story in this universe". Tripathi revealed that the film was initially much slower paced than the final film, with the initial script having more time to develop the characters.

=== Filming ===
Principal photography began on 5 June 2025 in Lucknow, Uttar Pradesh. Sharma said that Lucknow was suitable because of the city's cultural diversity and food traditions. He also stated that Lucknow had a good infrastucture for shooting films and that noted that much of the supporting cast was from Lucknow.

According to Tripathi, approximately 70 per cent of the film was shot inside a house during the city's summer season, with temperatures reaching 46 °C. White curtains were installed around the courtyard to control the lighting, which also contributed to the heat experienced by the cast and crew.

Tripathi also recalled being nervous about his character dancing in the song "Chhaap Tilak", until Sharma reassured him that the scene took place in his character's magination. For the climax scene in the film, Tripathi suggested to reducing the dialogue, as he believed the dialogue was long.

== Release ==
Parivarik ManuRanjan premiered on 13 November 2026 on SonyLIV. It was released directly on the streaming platform rather than receiving a theatrical release.

== Music ==
The music of the film was composed by Ali Abbas Zafar, Anuj Garg, and Shamir Tandon while lyrics were written by Panther, Niket Pandey, Ali Abbas Zafar, Nikhat Khan, Yash Kapoor and Anuj Garg.

Track listing
No.	Title	Lyrics	Music	Singer(s)	Length
1.	"Chhaap Tilak"	Panther, Niket Pandey	Shamir Tandon	Pallavi Chaudhary, Krishnakali Saha, Panther	3:25
2.	"Jingle Bell"	Ali Abbas Zafar, Nikhat Khan	Ali Abbas Zafar	Vishal Mishra	3:21
3.	"Yaad Tu Aaya"	Yash Kapoor, Anuj Garg	Anuj Garg	Jubin Nautiyal, Aseem Trivedi	3:35
4.	"Sir Sir Sir"	Ali Abbas Zafar	Ali Abbas Zafar	Vishal Mishra, Ali Abbas Zafar	2:52
5.	"Yaad Tu Aaya" (Folk)	Yash Kapoor, Anuj Garg	Anuj Garg	V Cash	4:23
6.	"Yaad Tu Aaya" (Reprise)	Yash Kapoor, Anuj Garg	Anuj Garg	Dhvani Bhanushali	3:35
Total length:					21:11

== Reception ==
Shweta Keshri of India Today criticised the predictable writing and the lack of emotional depth in the central relationship. Avinash Ramachandran of The New Indian Express praised the performances of Tripathi and Rao Hydari. However, he questioned the film's treatment of relationships and social differences. Deepa Gahlot of Rediff.com criticized that the narrative weakened when outside characters became involved and opined the narrative was predictable; the romantic portions of the film were described as "enjoyable." Anuj Kumar, writing for The Hindu suggested "Watch it if you seek a streak of sunshine in the otherwise dark OTT universe."
