= Fursat (film) =

Indian musical romance short film

- Directed by: Vishal Bhardwaj
- Written by: Vishal Bhardwaj; Jyotsna Hariharan
- Produced by: Sadhya Vyas; Natasha Sunderan
- Starring: Ishaan Khattar; Wamiqa Gabbi; Salman Yusuff Khan
- Cinematography: Swapnil S. Sonawane
- Edited by: Vedant Joshi
- Music by: Vishal Bhardwaj
- Production companies: Absolute Productions; VB Pictures
- Release date: 3 February 2023
- Running time: 30 minutes
- Country: India
- Language: Hindi

Fursat (transl. 'Leisure') is a 2023 Indian Hindi-language musical romance short film directed by Vishal Bhardwaj, who co-wrote the script with Jyotsna Hariharan. Produced by Absolute Productions and VB Pictures, the film stars Ishaan Khattar, Wamiqa Gabbi and Salman Yusuff Khan. The film revolves around a man who finds an ancient artefact that transported him to the future, and how his quest affects his present timeline.

Bhardwaj conceived his idea on shooting a film via smartphones after discovering several short films that were filmed through them during the COVID-19 pandemic. He then developed a script that was inspired by Hollywood musical films that integrate song-and-dance sequences throughout the screenplay and explored time travel as the theme of the film. It was shot on an iPhone 14 Pro by cinematographer Swapnil S. Sonawane and edited by Vedant Joshi. Besides directing, Bhardwaj also composed the film score and soundtrack, with lyrics by Gulzar and Shiamak Davar handling the choreography for the song sequences.

Fursat was released on 3 February 2023 on YouTube. It received positive reviews from critics, with praise directed on the cinematography, music, choreography, performances from the lead cast and the technicalities, but noted the incoherence in the screenplay and aesthetic appeal.

== Plot ==
An archeologist Nishant Raj (Ishaan Khatter), discovers an ancient artifact that transports him to the future. Along the way he meets his childhood friend and doctor Diya Srivastav (Wamiqa Gabbi) and chief gangster (Salman Yusuff Khan). Nishant realizes that the more he wants to look towards the future, the greater the risk he has losing the present.

== Cast ==
- Ishaan Khatter as Nishant Raj
- Wamiqa Gabbi as Diya Srivastav
- Salman Yusuff Khan as Chief Gangster
- Kumaradas T.N. as Jhandi Gangster
- Sahaj Singh as Arjun
- Ishrat Khan as Diya's mother
- Bimal Jeet Oberoi as Diya's father
- Arpa Parekh as Arjun's mother
- Jeetendra M. Kosambi as Arjun's father

== Production ==
Vishal Bhardwaj initially spearheaded on two projects for Netflix and Amazon Prime Video after the release of Pataakha (2018)—one being an adaptation of the Salman Rushdie's novel Midnight's Children and the other based on the hijacking of the Indian Airlines Flight 814. Both were pulled out by the respective platforms, due to logistic reasons. During the COVID-19 pandemic, Bhardwaj then watched the Chinese short films 3 Minutes (2018) and Nian (2021), which were filmed on iPhone. Impressed by the technological developments of filmmaking and being keen on experiments, Bhardwaj then met the executives of Apple Inc.—which advocated major filmmaking techniques during the pandemic—and talked about the same; they asked the former on a script regarding "a love story and their meeting on a moving train" and further wanted it to be a Bollywood film having layers and nuances on its storytelling. They further expected on developing it as a musical film on the lines of Chicago (2002), where "once the song comes, the cast moves to a stage to perform. That gives a wider canvas to play with the inner emotions." Bhardwaj, who was keen on doing a musical film, had co-written a script with Jyotsna Hariharan, which is about a youngster who gets a magical device to view the future and how its impacts his present life.

"Vishal Bhardwaj is an amazing person with a fascinating brain. He is one of those people who is born to do what he does. His vision is very strong and as an actor it's great fun to work with him because he comes up with these little suggestions that changes the way you look at things."

— Ishaan Khatter, on working with Bhardwaj

Ishaan Khatter and Wamiqa Gabbi were cast as the lead pair, while Salman Yusuff Khan joined in an important role. As the film required contemporary dance sequences, Bhardwaj was unsure about Gabbi's dancing abilities and often discussed on simplifying the choreography but was impressed on her dance performance on the very first rehearsal itself. Gabbi, being a trained kathak dancer, learned contemporary dance steps for her role with Khatter. As she had commitments on multiple projects, she ended up shuffling between the schedules in order to prepare immensely. She prepared for 8–9 days for the dance sequences, despite the time constraints. Shiamak Davar choreographed the film's musical sequences, who described it as an Indo-contemporary style, much different from his usual choreography styles in his films.

Filming for Fursat took place in late 2022 with cinematographer Swapnil S. Sonawane shooting it on iPhone 14 Pro. Bhardwaj described filming on an iPhone was a "liberative" experience, compared to filming on traditional cameras, as it comes with numerous constraints. The entire film was shot in 4K resolution with 30 frames per second. Much of the film was covered in "action mode".

== Themes and influences ==
According to Bhardwaj, the tile Fursat is referred to "freedom" or "leisure". He further described about the core script, adding that "We are all running after what will happen next or pondering over what happened in the past. Amid this, we are losing our moment of leisure, our freedom to live the moment." Bhardwaj further explored the concept of time travel with this film.

== Soundtrack ==
The music for Fursat is composed by Vishal Bhardwaj and lyrics written by his regular collaborator Gulzar. The album was released on the same date as the film's premiere, 3 February 2023.

== Release ==
Fursat was announced on 3 February 2023, where the film was premiered through the official YouTube channel of Apple. Prior to its release, the film was specially screened at the headquarters of Apple Inc. in Mumbai on 2 February. The film is also available released through Apple TV+ and Disney+ Hotstar.

Fursat was premiered at the MAMI Mumbai Film Festival 2023 on the closing night of the event, at the "Jio MAMI Select" programme.

== Reception ==
Abhishek Srivastava of The Times of India gave the film three stars out of five and wrote "The film testifies to Bharadwaj’s abilities to tell a witty, intelligent, and entertaining story with comedy, drama, and some mystique in the short format." Roktim Rajpal of India Today described it as "a simple yet ambitious short film that works mainly because of Vishal Bharadwaj’s command over his craft" calling it as a "commendable" effort catering to those looking for something short, simple, and sweet. Rajpai also praised the performances of the lead pair, adding that "Wamiqa and Ishaan's chemistry is decent given the fact that Fursat is a short film." Prateek Lidhoo in his review for The Quint, stated "the film gives a glimpse of how restrictions can sometimes get the best out of a filmmaker".

In his review for Firstpost, Subhash K. Jha was critical of the film, stating "Imagine the resources which can be saved if expensive cameras and equipment are deleted from the filmmaking process. But while doing away with a lot of the accompanying baggage, Fursat has also done away with coherence." Prathyush Parasuraman of Frontline stated that "Cinematically, however, Fursat is a weak film, so insistent on showing the technical versatility of the phone using the visual versatility of a genre like time travel and the musical that it is not as much interested in a coherent story that builds tension and momentum [...] The aesthetic is one of technical excess, with some blurs, some odd frames—where rain looks like crosshatches on the screen, for example. The film wants to scream the possibilities of the iPhone at us. One wishes only that it had come with the whisper of a story that moved us, too. But at the very least we are sold on the product, for the most part."

Apple CEO Tim Cook praised the film complimenting the cinematography and choreography.

== Awards and nominations ==
Year	Award	Category	Recipient(s)	Result	Ref.
2023	Cannes Lions For Music	Original Composition	Vishal Bhardwaj	Won	
