= Amrutharamam =

- Film poster
- Directed by: Surender Kontaddi
- Written by: Surender Kontaddi
- Produced by: S. N. Reddy
- Starring: Ram Mittakanti; Amitha Ranganath
- Cinematography: Santosh Shanamoni
- Music by: NS Prasu
- Production companies: Padmaja Films India; Suresh Productions (presenter)
- Distributed by: ZEE5
- Release date: 29 April 2020
- Country: India
- Language: Telugu
- Budget: ₹1.5 crore

Amrutharamam is a 2020 Indian Telugu-language romance film written and directed by Surender Kontaddi, starring Ram Mittakanti and Amitha Ranganath. The film has music composed by NS Prasu. It was the first Telugu film to have a direct-to-OTT release. The plot revolves around an NRI couple in Australia who fall for each other. Released on ZEE5, the film received an indifferent response from the audience.

== Cast ==
- Ram Mittakanti as Ram
- Amitha Ranganath as Amrutha

== Production and release ==
The entire film was shot in New South Wales, Australia.

The film was initially scheduled for a theatrical release on 25 March 2020, but was postponed due to the COVID-19 pandemic. On 29 April 2020, the film was released directly on ZEE5.

== Reception ==
The Times of India rated the film 2/5 and termed the film as "[an] overdose of melodrama." On the debutant actors, the review added that "The performances are not impressive and both the leads fail to make a mark." The Hindu's Sangeetha Devi Dundoo opined that "The plot of Amrutharamam feels outdated." and "tries too hard to be a saga of eternal love" A reviewer from Sakshi wrote that the screenplay of the film offers nothing new.
