= Meka Suri =

2020 film directed by Trinadh Velisala

- Poster
- Directed by: Trinadh Velisala
- Written by: Trinadh Velisala
- Produced by: Karthik Kancherla
- Starring: Abinay; Syed Sumaya Farahath; Sharat Kumar; Byreddy Naresh; Sharavan Sai Tadinada
- Cinematography: Pardhu Saina
- Edited by: Suresh K Kasukurthi
- Music by: Prajwal Krish
- Production company: Simba Entertainment
- Distributed by: ZEE5
- Release date: 31 July 2020
- Running time: 86 minutes
- Country: India
- Language: Telugu

Meka Suri is a 2020 Indian Telugu-language drama directed by Trinadh Velisala. Produced by 1725 Studio and Simba Entertainment, the film stars Abhinay Reddy, Syed Sumaya Farahath, Sharath Kumar, Byreddy Naresh, and Sharavan Sai Tadinada. The plot revolves around the character Suri, a butcher popularly known as "Meka," who marries his love, Rani. However, when Rani gets brutally murdered by a group of people, Meka Suri decides to avenge her death with the help of Naxalites. The film premiered through ZEE5 on 31 July 2020.

Meka Suri was followed by a sequel Meka Suri 2 released on 27 November 2020.

== Plot ==
Suri is a 6-foot-3-inch (191 cm) tall butcher popularly known as "Meka Suri" for his exceptional skill in skinning an entire goat (called Meka in Telugu) within minutes. He is married to a beautiful, local village girl named Rani. The landlord of the village, Appala Naidu, and his friends exploit and murder his beloved wife, turning Meka's life upside-down. Full of rage, he seeks revenge and executes the trio right under the police's nose with the help of Naxals.

== Cast ==
- Abhinay Reddy as Meka Suri
- Syed Sumaya Farahath as Rani
- Sharath Kumar as Appal Naidu
- Byreddy Naresh as Veerabhadram
- Sharavan Sai Tadinada as Raghuram

== Production ==
The film's director Trinadh Velisala said "It's a true story which was narrated by my relatives in Prakasam district some time ago. Taking their version, I started developing a story along with other inputs. I felt disappointed personally when his village landlords ruined butcher Suri's life."

== Release ==
Meka Suri premiered through ZEE5 on July 31, 2020.

== Reception ==
The film received mixed reviews.

Neeshita Nyayapati from Times Of India wrote, "After an endless cycle of this for one-and-a-half-hours with nothing else really happening on the screen, it makes you wonder where the story is buried."
