= Ishaan Khatter =

Indian actor (born 1995)

- Khatter in 2025
- Born: 1 November 1995 (age 31); Mumbai, Maharashtra, India
- Occupation: Actor
- Years active: 2017–present
- Parents: Rajesh Khattar (father); Neelima Azeem (mother)
- Relatives: See Kapur family

Ishaan Khatter (born 1 November 1995) is an Indian actor. The son of actors Rajesh Khattar and Neelima Azeem, he made his first screen appearance as a child in the 2005 film Vaah! Life Ho Toh Aisi!, which starred his half-brother Shahid Kapoor. Khatter had his first leading role in Majid Majidi's drama Beyond the Clouds (2017), in which his performance as a drug dealer won him the Filmfare Award for Best Male Debut.

His first commercial success came with the romantic drama Dhadak (2018), and he has since starred in the British miniseries A Suitable Boy (2020), the American miniseries The Perfect Couple (2024) and the Indian romantic drama series The Royals (2025). His performance as a Muslim man navigating religious discrimination in Homebound (2025) has since earned critical acclaim. In 2025, he was featured in Forbes Asia's 30 Under 30 list.

== Early life and background ==
Khatter is the son of actors Rajesh Khattar and Neelima Azeem. Through his mother Neelima, he is related to the family of Khwaja Ahmad Abbas, a writer and film director. His half-brother, Shahid Kapoor, is Azeem's son from her first marriage to actor Pankaj Kapur. Khatter describes himself as someone who is proud of his middle class values. He explains that he grew up in a household rich in culture, cinema, and the performing arts, and that he worked towards developing himself as an artiste. Khatter was educated at Jamnabai Narsee School and Billabong High International School, Juhu in Mumbai. He also studied dance at Shiamak Davar's academy.

After making his first screen appearance as a child in the 2005 film Vaah! Life Ho Toh Aisi!, starring Kapoor, Khatter worked as an assistant director to Abhishek Chaubey on his film Udta Punjab (2016) and Danish Renzu on the independent film Half Widow (2017).

== Career ==
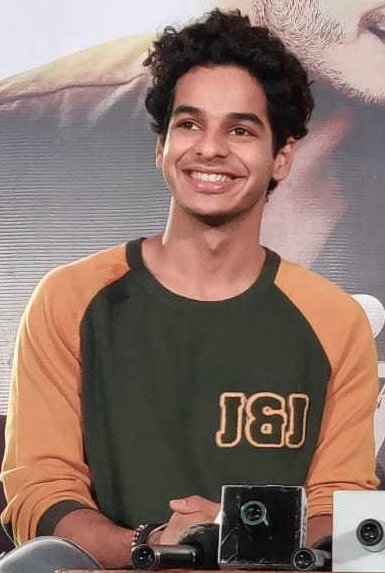
Khatter promoting Dhadak in 2018

Khatter's first acting role as an adult came with Beyond the Clouds (2017), directed by Majid Majidi, in which he played Amir, a drug dealer. It premiered at the BFI London Film Festival and was released theatrically in 2018. Reviewing the film for The Hollywood Reporter, Deborah Young wrote that Khatter's "noteworthy screen charisma promises well for his future career". He won the Best Actor award at the 5th International Bosphorous Film Festival and the Filmfare Award for Best Male Debut.

Khatter next played the lead role in Shashank Khaitan's romantic drama Dhadak (2018), a remake of the Marathi film Sairat (2016), co-starring debutante Janhvi Kapoor. It tells the story of two young lovers in rural Rajasthan who face political opposition to their relationship due to caste discrimination. Uday Bhatia of Mint criticized Dhadak for lacking the depth of the original film, but found "a soulfulness to [Khatter] that's at odds with Hindi cinema's current penchant for bratty, hyperactive onscreen male personas". Shubhra Gupta of The Indian Express too disliked the film, but labelled Khatter a "natural" performer and took note of his "mobile, expressive face". With worldwide earnings of over ₹1.1 billion (US$12 million), Dhadak emerged as a commercial success.

In 2020, Khatter starred in the British miniseries A Suitable Boy, Mira Nair's adaptation of Vikram Seth's novel of the same name, in which he was paired opposite Tabu. It aired in six parts on BBC One. He was drawn to the project due to its depiction of an older woman-young man romance, which he hoped would challenge social stigma of such relationships. Hugo Rifkind of The Times found Khatter to be "suitably charismatic and dangerous" in his part. That same year, he starred alongside Ananya Panday in the action film Khaali Peeli, which due to COVID-19 pandemic was released digitally on Zee Plex.

In 2022, Khatter featured alongside Katrina Kaif and Siddhant Chaturvedi in the comedy horror film Phone Bhoot. Reviewers were generally unimpressed with the picture, but Saibal Chatterjee of NDTV thought that the "charm and spunk" that Khatter brought to his comic role enabled him to "[walk] away with the film". The following year, he started in a promotional short film for Apple Inc., titled Fursat, directed by Vishal Bhardwaj on an iPhone 14 Pro. In the war drama Pippa, set during the Indo-Pakistani War of 1971, Khatter played the real-life character of army commander Balram Singh Mehta. In preparation, he spent time with Mehta and attended military boot camp. Initially scheduled for a theatrical release, it was eventually released on Amazon Prime Video after several delays. Rediff.com's critic Sukanya Verma opined, "There's a hearty quality to Ishaan, but in Pippa he's trying too hard."

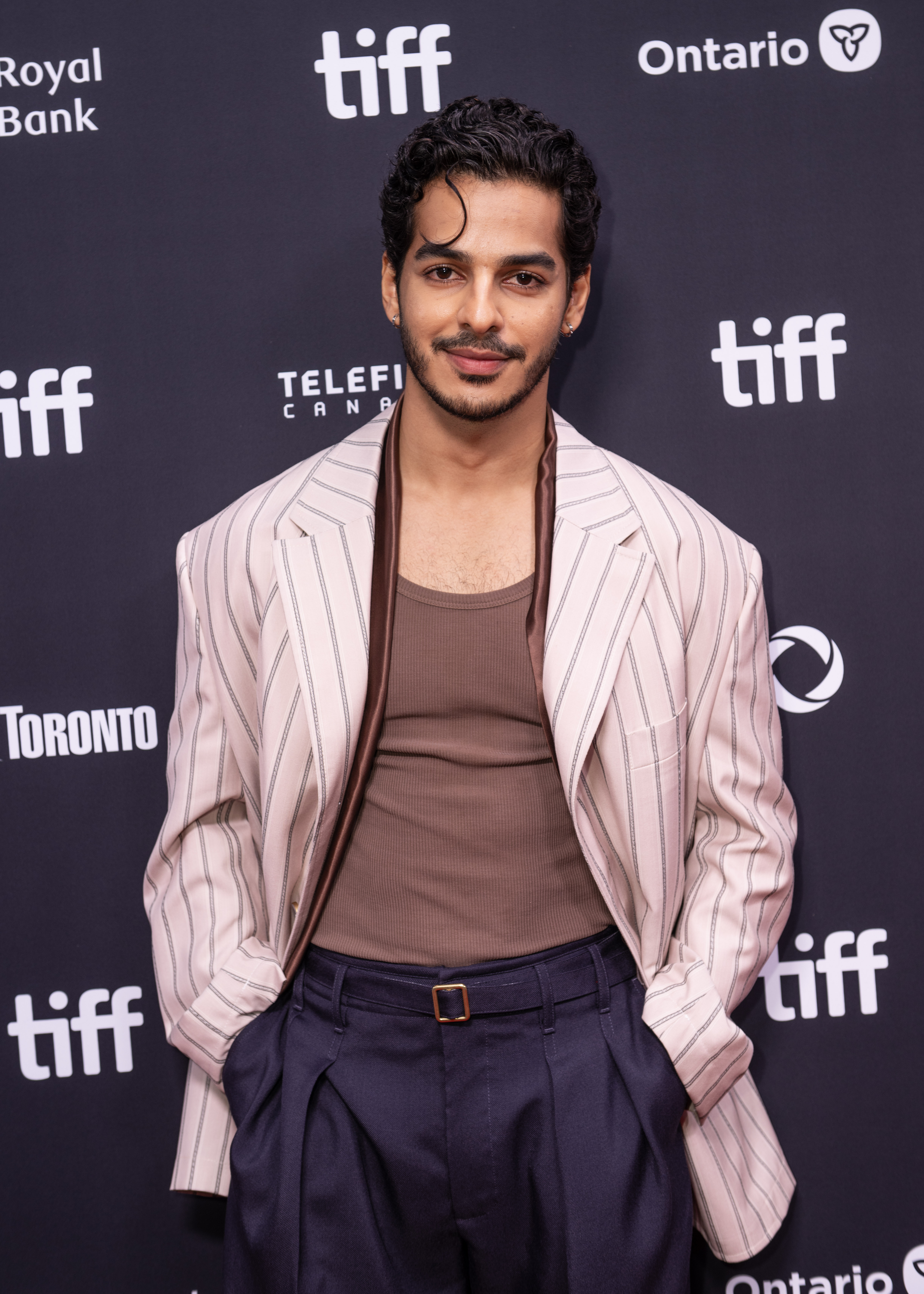
Khatter at the 2025 Toronto International Film Festival

In 2024, Khatter featured alongside an ensemble cast in The Perfect Couple, an American Netflix limited series based on Elin Hilderbrand's mystery novel of the same name. Screen Rant's Mae Abdulbaki found his character's subplot to be of minimal significance to the main storyline. In the Netflix series The Royals (2025), Khatter played a reluctant heir opposite Bhumi Pednekar. Udita Jhunjhunwala of Scroll.in criticised the objectification of Khatter and dismissed the chemistry between him and Pednekar.

In 2025, Khatter starred alongside Vishal Jethwa in Neeraj Ghaywan's in Homebound, which premiered in the Un Certain Regard section at the 77th Cannes Film Festival. The film received a nine-minute standing ovation at its debut screening. Following its Cannes success, the film was selected for the Gala Presentations section at the 2025 Toronto International Film Festival. The film received critical acclaim; Variety noted that "Khatter and Jethwa put on immensely endearing and unpredictable performances". Santanu Das of Hindustan Times called it "deeply empathetic", and praised Khatter's performance as "affecting and powerful".

== Media image ==
Khatter was ranked by The Times of India in its "Most Desirable Men" listings at No. 27 in 2018, at No. 32 in 2019, at No. 25 in 2020. In 2026, Time magazine named him to its TIME100 Next India list, recognising him as one of India's emerging influential figures.

== Filmography ==
=== Films ===
| † | Denotes films that have not yet been released |

| Year | Title | Role | Notes | Ref. |
|---|---|---|---|---|
| 2005 | Vaah! Life Ho Toh Aisi! | Ishaan | Child artist | |
| 2016 | Udta Punjab | Unnamed | Also assistant director | |
| 2017 | Half Widow | —N/a | Assistant director | |
| 2017 | Beyond the Clouds | Amir Ahmed | | |
| 2018 | Dhadak | Madhukar Bagla “Madhu” | | |
| 2020 | Khaali Peeli | Vijay Chauhan "Banda Blackie" | | |
| 2021 | Don't Look Up | Raghav Manavalan | American film; cameo | |
| 2022 | Phone Bhoot | Galileo "Gullu" Parthasarthy | | |
| 2023 | Fursat | Nishant Raj | Short film | |
| 2023 | Pippa | Captain Balram Singh Mehta "Balli" | | |
| 2025 | Homebound | Mohammed Shoaib Ali | | |

=== Television ===
| Year | Title | Role | Notes | Ref. |
|---|---|---|---|---|
| 2020 | A Suitable Boy | Maan Kapoor | British Miniseries | |
| 2024 | The Perfect Couple | Shooter Dival | American Miniseries | |
| 2025–present | The Royals | Aviraaj Singh Maharaj "Fizzy" | | |

=== Music video appearances ===
| Year | Title | Singer(s) | Ref. |
|---|---|---|---|
| 2025 | "Pyaar Aata Hai" | Shreya Ghoshal, Rito Riba | |

== Awards and nominations ==
| Year | Award | Category | Film | Result | Ref. |
|---|---|---|---|---|---|
| 2017 | International Bosphorous Film Festival | Best Actor | Beyond the Clouds | Won | |
| 2018 | Screen Awards | Best Male Debut | Beyond the Clouds / Dhadak | Won | |
| 2018 | Screen Awards | Best Actor Critics | Beyond the Clouds / Dhadak | Nominated | |
| 2019 | Zee Cine Awards | Best Male Debut | Dhadak | Won | |
| 2019 | Filmfare Awards | Best Male Debut | Beyond the Clouds | Won | |
| 2019 | International Indian Film Academy Awards | Star Debut of the Year – Male | Dhadak | Won | |
| 2019 | ETC Bollywood Business Awards | Highest Grossing Debut Actor | Dhadak | Won | |
| 2023 | Bollywood Hungama Style Icons | Most Stylish Mould Breaking Star (Male) | —N/a | Nominated | |
| 2023 | Bollywood Hungama Style Icons | Most Stylish Emerging Icon | —N/a | Won | |
| 2023 | News18 Reel Awards | Performance in a Comic Role | Phone Bhoot | Nominated | |
| 2024 | Filmfare OTT Awards | Best Actor in a Web Original Film (Male) | Pippa | Nominated | |
| 2026 | Screen Awards | Best Actor | Homebound | Nominated | |
| 2026 | News18 Reel Awards | Best Actor | Homebound | Won | |
