= Meka Suri 2 =

Indian Telugu-language crime thriller film

- Directed by: Trinadh Velisila
- Written by: Trinadh Velisala
- Produced by: Karthik Kancherla
- Starring: Abhinay; Sumaya Syed
- Cinematography: Pardhu Saina
- Edited by: Suresh K Kasukurthi
- Music by: Prajwal Krish
- Production companies: Simba Entertainment; 1725 Studio
- Distributed by: ZEE5
- Release date: 27 November 2020
- Running time: 86 min
- Country: India
- Language: Telugu

Meka Suri 2 is Indian Telugu-language crime and thriller-based original web film directed by Trinadh Velisila. The film was digitally released on 27 November 2020 on ZEE5. Producer by Karthik Kancherla under the production house 1725 Studio & Simba Entertainment. Starring with Abhinay Reddy, Naresh Byreddy, Lirisha & Sumaya Syed.

Meka Suri 2 is a sequel of Meka Suri released on 31 July 2020.

== Synopsis ==
The story starts with a time-lapse of 20 years. Suri is now the most wanted criminal. Top cop Arjun is assigned the case to trace and put Suri behind the bars. But the only information Arjun has of Suri is that he was shot dead years ago. Arjun does not even know how Suri looks now or where he is. He goes to Raghuram in search of clues but in vain. He gets to know the entire revenge story and also the reason for Suri to become the most wanted criminal.

After great efforts, Arjun can track Suri. Arjun tries to trap Suri through a sting operation, however, it backfires on Arjun. Suri is too smart for Arjun and Suri throws an open challenge to Arjun by giving him names of the people he is going to kill. He challenges him to stop him if he can! Despite Arjun's perfect planning, Suri outsmarts Arjun again!

But finally, Arjun finds a loophole of Suri. Arjun finds out that Suri has killed an innocent man unknowingly! And that man's 15-year-old son wants to take an act of revenge with Suri. Arjun makes him realize that the path of killings has never taken anyone to the right path, it always ends badly. Suri realizes and surrenders.

== Cast ==
- Abhinay Reddy as Meka Suri
- Syed Sumaya Farahath as Rani
- Sharath Kumar as Appal Naidu
- Dr Pramod Kumar as ACP Arjun
- Byreddy Naresh as Veerabhadram
- Sharavan Sai Tadinada as Raghuram
- Lirisha

== Releases ==
ZEE5 announced that the film will be released digitally on their platform on 27 November 2020.
