= Beyond the Clouds (2017 film) =

2018 film by Majid Majidi

Beyond The Clouds
- Theatrical release poster
- Directed by: Majid Majidi
- Screenplay by: Mehran Kashani; Majid Majidi
- Story by: Majid Majidi
- Produced by: Shareen Mantri Kedia; Kishor Arora
- Starring: Ishaan Khatter; Malavika Mohanan
- Cinematography: Anil Mehta
- Edited by: Hassan Hassandoost
- Music by: A. R. Rahman
- Production company: Namah Pictures
- Distributed by: Zee Studios
- Release dates: 20 November 2017 (IFFI); 20 April 2018 (India)
- Running time: 120 minutes
- Country: India
- Language: Hindi

Beyond the Clouds is a 2018 Indian Hindi-language drama film written and directed by Majid Majidi, under the production banner Zee Studios. It stars debutante Ishaan Khatter as Amir, a street hustler and drug dealer in the city of Mumbai and Malavika Mohanan (in her Bollywood Debut as Leading Actress and also daughter of Cinematographer K. U. Mohanan) as Tara, the sister of Amir. She works for a dour merchant Akshi (Gautam Ghose). The film story is centred around the bonding between the siblings, a take on human relationships in general. The sibling's bond is tested when Tara lands in jail for a crime Amir committed, which forms the film's crux. The film is a grown-up version of Majidi's previously directed Children of Heaven (1997).

The casting for the project began in August 2016, with principal photography commencing from January 2017 in Mumbai, continued in Sambhar near Jaipur, and concluded in Mumbai on 6 May 2017. Before theatrical release, the film premiered at International Film Festivals between October 2017 and February 2018. It was screened at International Film Festival of India on 20 November 2017. Beyond the Clouds is the second collaboration between Majid Majidi and film score composer A. R. Rahman, after Muhammad: The Messenger of God (2015).

The film was released in India on 20 April 2018 to generally positive reviews. It was praised for the performances of the lead characters and cinematography but criticized for the direction, film score, and predictable storyline.

== Plot ==
The film begins with Aamir (Ishaan Khatter), a young man who lives under a road bridge where numerous impoverished families live, grabbing a bike and carrying out a series of drug deliveries all over the city.

A police bust interrupts Aamir, who is chased into the laundry workplace of Aamir's sister Taara (Malavika Mohanan). With the help of an older male colleague Akshi (Goutam Ghose), Taara conceals her brother and his stash of drugs. But in Akshi's mind, his help means that Taara is now somehow beholden to him. He assaults her, but Taara defends herself by hitting his head with a rock.

Taara finds herself facing life in prison unless Akshi recovers and can be persuaded to admit his role in the incident. But although he regains consciousness, Akshi is unable to talk. Both Taara and Aamir find hope in their desperate situation through connections with other children. Taara befriends Chotu, the child of an ailing prisoner, while Aamir initially considers selling Akshi's eldest daughter to a local brothel. But Aamir grudgingly warms to Akshi's mother and two daughters.

== Cast ==
- Ishaan Khatter as Amir Ahmed
- Malavika Mohanan as Tara Neshan
- G. V. Sharada as Jhumpa
- Gautam Ghose as Akshi
- Tannishtha Chatterjee as Chotu's mom
- Aakash Gopal as Anil, Amir's Friend
- Dhwani Rajesh as Tanisha
- Amruta Santosh Thakur as Asha
- Shivam Pujari as Chotu
- Heeba Shah as Head nurse

== Production ==
=== Development ===
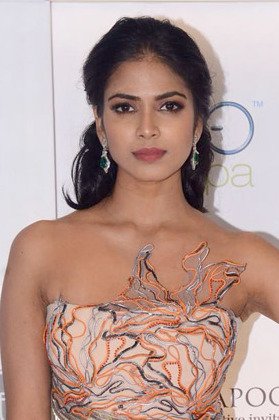
Malavika Mohanan, one of the film's leads

In August 2016, director Majid Majidi landed in Mumbai for a reconnaissance. He met the casting director Honey Trehan, who stated that the film will be an Indian story to be shot in Mumbai, Delhi, parts of Uttar Pradesh, Rajasthan and Kashmir. Trehan was told to scout at least eight to ten of the principal characters drawn from across the country. A. R. Rahman's inclusion in the project was confirmed. In an interview with The Hindu, Majidi stated, "It is the story of a brother and sister, just like that of Children of Heaven (1997), with the difference being that the siblings are grown-ups and tackle greater conflicts, with the bustling city of Mumbai serving as the backdrop."

In November 2016, photographs of actress Deepika Padukone were published through Deccan Chronicle where she was seen participating in a day long shoot for Majid Majidi's next untitled project that reported by the media by the titles Floating Gardens and Kashmir Afloat.

A conference held in Mumbai on 23 January 2017, the film was officially titled "Beyond the Clouds". Majidi stated the film will be in Hindi language. Ishaan Khatter was confirmed to play the male lead. On the departure of Padukone from the project, Majidi reasoned that Padukone wasn't fitting for this film and his team decided not to opt for a mixture of experienced and new faces but either of the two (experienced or new faces), thus, settling for an all-new star cast. Kangana Ranaut rejected the offered role citing it as submissive. Majidi stated: "Beyond the Clouds could have been set anywhere in the world, but it also needed to be located in India. India gave me the proper feeling I had envisaged for the story." Malavika Mohanan was signed to play the role of the female lead in March 2017. Khatter and Mohanan share were reported to play the roles of siblings in the film. Mohanan plays the character Tara, a poor girl from a dhobi ghat.

=== Filming ===
Principal photography commenced without a lead female on 23 January 2017. Filming continued in Mumbai in February 2017. In March 2017, the film began with its Jaipur schedule. A film set resembling the slums of Mumbai was reconstructed at Sambhar, Rajasthan. It was in this scheduled when Malavika Mohanan joined to play the lead female role. In April, scenes were filmed at Chhatrapati Shivaji Terminus. The last shot of the film was canned at a street sequence at Filmistan Studio in Mumbai. Ninety percent of the film was shot on outdoor locations. The filming was completed on 6 May 2017.

Talking about the filming, Majidi said: "Filmmakers like Satyajit Ray, whose work I adore, have represented India's culture, rich heritage and the lives of common people to a global audience. These visions and images have stayed in my mind for years and cajoled me to make a film in India. Finally, I'm in Mumbai with a lovely team to narrate a story woven around the lives of common people".

== Soundtrack ==
The film score and soundtrack album is written and composed by A. R. Rahman. The album was released through CDs on 2 April 2018, and in LPs on 30 May 2018.

== Release ==
The first look poster of the film was released at the 67th Berlin International Film Festival. The second poster was released in 2017 Cannes Film Festival. The film premiered at the 2017 BFI London Film Festival. It was screened at the 22nd Busan International Film Festival, 14th Dubai International Film Festival, 5th International Bosphorous Film Festival, 29th Palm Springs International Film Festival and was the opening film at the 48th International Film Festival of India (IFFI) on 20 November 2017.

The theatrical release of the film was planned in two phases. In the first phase, the film was released in 34 territories by Zee Studios International. The countries covered in phase one are Iran as well as over 70 screens in the GCC region including Dubai, Kuwait, Oman, Bahrain, and Qatar. Towards the west, USA, Canada, UK, Netherlands, Belgium, Maldives, Luxembourg, Singapore, Australia, New Zealand, Fiji, East West & South Africa, Malaysia, Indonesia, and Pakistan.

The second phase of release includes the countries Jordan, Egypt, Lebanon, Taiwan, China, Japan, Korea and Russia.

Beyond the Clouds was released in India on 20 April 2018.

== Reception ==
=== Critical response ===
On the review aggregator website Rotten Tomatoes, 55% of 20 critics' reviews are positive, with an average rating of 6/10.

=== International ===
Simon Abrams of Roger Ebert stated: "Majidi and Kashani's shared vision feels incomplete, as if they were moments away from realizing how to temper their story's condescending, but well-meaning perspective, but never got around to doing it." Critic Glenn Kenny of The New York Times noted that Majidi has a terrific talent for staging and shooting. However, he added that his story instincts are more run of the mill. Critic Guy Lodge based at Variety, stated: "Majidi's young leads lack finesse, but not emotive conviction, which suits the film's purposes just fine; egged along by that score, it's mostly all-caps protest cinema, getting its worthwhile message unambiguously across." Deborah Young who writes for The Hollywood Reporter, noted: "Beyond the Clouds is more openly dramatic, with its poor siblings caught between the implacable law which throws suspects into prison without trial and ferocious vice lords who control drugs and prostitution with impunity. In this toxic environment, children are collateral victims." For Screen Daily, Wendy Ide reviewed: "Although at times a little overwrought in tone, and at others emphatically sentimental, the film doesn't pull its punches when it comes to condemning a society which punishes its poor. It's also an arresting visual experience: a potent recurring motif uses silhouettes; another a scattering flocks of birds." Shyam Krishna Kumar of Gulf News stated: "Beyond the Clouds talks, with an extremely light touch, about the added pressure poverty puts on women and their safety. Majidi manages to tell this story in a country unlike his own — and tell it well — is a testament to its universal strength." J. Hurtado of Screen Anarchy stated: "A stranger in a strange land, Majidi's film attempts to use the rhythms of Bollywood without fully committing to the form, leaving this film as a bit of a half-baked effort that, while certainly worth watching, is far from a masterpiece". Anisha Jhaveri of IndieWire, graded the film B+ and noted: "Heartrending one minute and heavy-handed the next, "Beyond the Clouds" is in equal parts beautiful and frustrating."

==== India ====
Film critic Komal Nahta reviewed: "Beyond The Clouds is a beautifully shot and beautifully made human drama with some sterling performances. But it has limited appeal at the box-office because of the way in which it has been treated. Its difficult English title and lack of recognisable faces will further restrict its commercial chances."

Devesh Sharma of Filmfare reviewed, "It's the duty of artist to familiarise the unfamiliar and that's what Majidi has done here." He assigned the film 3.5 stars out of 5. Umesh Punwani at Koimoi gave the film 3.5 stars out of 5 and stated: "Majid Majidi, though not playing on his home ground, manages to hit the ball out of the park." Niel Soans of The Times of India assigned 3.5 stars out of 5, noting the visual appeal and direction, he pointed: "Majidi's subject matter might seem to be repetitive, but the famed director's take on redemption is fleshed out by strong performances to make Beyond the Clouds another notable entry in his filmography." Critic Anupama Chopra who wrote the review for Film Companion gave the film 3 stars out of 5, stated: "Beyond the Clouds is a mixed bag. It is likely to be a footnote in Majidi's rich filmography. But the film is worth seeing as an intriguing experiment." Critic Rajeev Masand who wrote for News 18, reviewed by assigning 3 stars out of 5, "Ultimately the film offers comfort in the familiar…for those that seek it. It's Majid Majidi-lite at best; a bittersweet, inoffensive drama that runs, but never flies". NDTV's Saibal Chatterjee gave the film 2.5 stars out of 5, calling it "overheated and underwhelming". Reviewing the film for Hindustan Times, critic Rohit Vats assigned 2.5 stars out of 5 and stated: "Despite excellent symbols and good performances in patches, Beyond The Clouds remains something we have seen before." Shubhra Gupta of The Indian Express reviewed that the film is good-looking yet hollow, assigning it 2 stars out of 5. Namrata Joshi of The Hindu pointed: "The film just doesn't manage to throb with the authenticity of experience. It feels like an artificial world – virtuous but curiously inert."
