= Sardar Udham (score) =

Soundtrack album by Shantanu Moitra
- Released: 2 October 2021
- Recorded: 2020–2021
- Genre: Feature film soundtrack
- Length: 26:00
- Language: Hindi
- Label: Zee Music Company
- Producer: George Joseph

Shantanu Moitra chronology
Kaadan (2021)	Sardar Udham (2021)	Sherdil: The Pilibhit Saga (2022)
External audio
- Sardar Udham - Full Album on YouTube

Sardar Udham is the soundtrack to the 2021 film of the same name directed by Shoojit Sircar, starring Vicky Kaushal as Udham Singh (on whom the film is based on), a freedom fighter from Punjab who assassinated Irishman Michael O'Dwyer in London to avenge the 1919 Jallianwala Bagh massacre in Amritsar. Sircar's regular collaborator Shantanu Moitra composed the film score; being a songless film, the soundtrack accompanied six instrumental compositions used in the film and produced by George Joseph. The soundtrack was released by Zee Music Company on 2 October 2021.

== Background ==
Moitra composed the film score during June 2020 as a part of the four-phase production process organised by Sircar during the COVID-19 lockdown period. Before the film began production, Moitra recorded an instrumental track considering the state of Udham Singh's mind in that music space. He, then implemented basic sketches of the musical score during post-production with the instrumentalists and arrangers planned and designed the film score at his home studio. Musician George Joseph handled the production of the instrumental score. Each musical tracks were curated carefully based on the life and events revolving around Udham Singh. On 2 October 2021, the lead actor, Vicky Kaushal, shared the entire music album through social media and music platforms who called it as the "soul of the film".

== Track listing ==
No.	Title	Length
1.	"Time To Meet My Friend"	4:02
2.	"Sardar Udham Theme"	2:10
3.	"Crush The Rebels"	5:11
4.	"You Are Not Coming Back"	4:40
5.	"I Was Late"	4:24
6.	"Koi Zinda Hai"	5:33
Total length:		26:00

== Reception ==
In the film's review published in the magazine The Week, Aiswarya Venugopal stated about the music, saying "the six instrumental tracks composed by Shantanu Moitra, flows perfectly as it depicts different phases of Udham's life". Umesh Punwani of Koimoi stated that the "background score shines in the second half". A reviewer from Deccan Herald too praised the exclusion of songs in the film as it caters "realistic storytelling". However, video creator Anmol Jamwal, shared his opinions on the film, praised Moitra's score as it infused with the visuals in the right manner, but, he felt that a composition of a poetry had "enhanced the quality of the film, in few disturbing scenes about the incident being showcased".

Saibal Chatterjee of NDTV praised the score as "restrained, unobtrusive, hugely effective".

== Accolades ==
Award	Date of ceremony	Category	Recipients	Result	Ref.
Filmfare Awards	30 August 2022	Best Background Score	Shantanu Moitra	Won	
