= List of awards and nominations received by Vicky Kaushal =

Vicky Kaushal awards and nominations
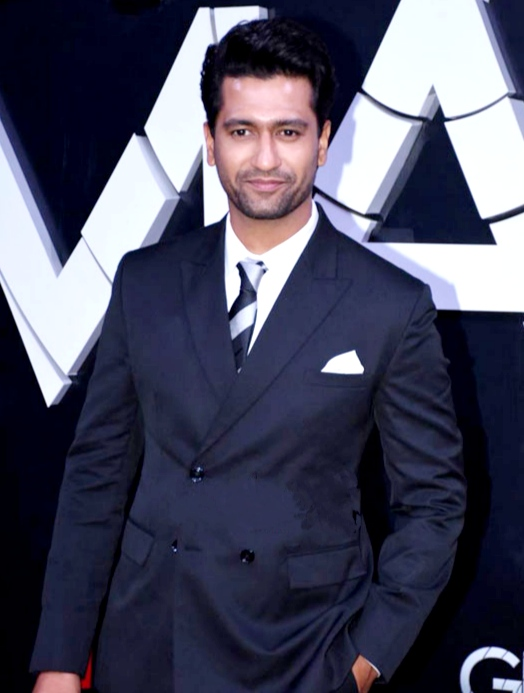
- Kaushal at the premiere of The Gray Man in 2022
Awards and nominations
Award	Wins	Nominations
National Film Awards	1	0
Filmfare Awards	3	7
Screen Awards	1	5
Zee Cine Awards	2	3
Stardust Awards	0	1
Star Guild Awards	0	1
IIFA Awards	3	5
Jagran Film Festival	1	0
Indian Film Festival of Melbourne	1	1
Others	11	8

Totals (Note: Certain award groups do not simply award one winner. They acknowledge several different recipients, have runners-up, and have third place. Since this is a specific recognition and is different from losing an award, runner-up mentions are considered wins in this award tally. For simplification and to avoid errors, each award in this list has been presumed to have had a prior nomination.)
- Wins: 28
- Nominations: 40

Vicky Kaushal is an Indian actor who appears in Hindi films. He has appeared in Forbes India's Celebrity 100 list of 2019. Kaushal is the recipient of 28 accolades into his credit. He won three IIFA Awards one Best Debut Actor for Masaan (2016), Best Supporting Actor for Sanju (2019) and Best Actor for Sardar Udham (2022). He received the Best Actor at the 66th National Film Awards for Uri: The Surgical Strike. Kaushal won the Filmfare Award for Best Supporting Actor for Sanju and Best Actor (Critics) for Sardar Udham.

== Awards and nominations ==
Year	Award	Category	Work	Result	Ref.
2016	Asian Film Awards	Best Newcomer	Masaan	Nominated	
2019	Asian Film Awards	Best Supporting Actor	Sanju	Nominated	
2019	Filmfare Awards	Best Supporting Actor	Sanju	Won (Note: Tied with Gajraj Rao for Badhaai Ho)	
2020	Filmfare Awards	Best Actor	Uri: The Surgical Strike	Nominated	
2022	Filmfare Awards	Best Actor	Sardar Udham	Nominated	
2022	Filmfare Awards	Best Actor (Critics)	Sardar Udham	Won	
2024	Filmfare Awards	Best Actor	Sam Bahadur	Nominated	
2024	Filmfare Awards	Best Actor (Critics)	Sam Bahadur	Nominated	
2024	Filmfare Awards	Best Supporting Actor	Dunki	Won	
2019	Indian Film Festival of Melbourne	Best Supporting Performance	Sanju	Won	
2016	International Indian Film Academy Awards	Best Debut Actor	Masaan	Won	
2019	International Indian Film Academy Awards	Best Supporting Actor	Sanju	Won	
2019	International Indian Film Academy Awards	Best Actor	Raazi	Nominated	
2020	International Indian Film Academy Awards	Best Actor	Uri: The Surgical Strike	Nominated	
2022	International Indian Film Academy Awards	Best Actor	Sardar Udham	Won	
2016	Jagran Film Festival	Special Jury Award	Masaan	Won	
2019	66th National Film Awards	Best Actor	Uri: The Surgical Strike	Won (Note: Tied with Ayushmann Khurrana for Andhadhun)	
2016	Producers Guild Film Awards	Best Debut Actor	Masaan	Nominated	
2016	Screen Awards	Best Male Debut	Masaan	Won	
2019	Screen Awards	Best Supporting Actor	Raazi	Nominated	
2019	Screen Awards	Best Supporting Actor	Sanju	Nominated	
2019	Screen Awards	Best Actor	Manmarziyaan	Nominated	
2020	Screen Awards	Best Actor	Uri: The Surgical Strike	Nominated	
2016	Stardust Awards	Best Acting Debut (Male)	Masaan	Nominated	
2016	Zee Cine Awards	Best Male Debut	Masaan	Won	
2019	Zee Cine Awards	Best Actor in a Supporting Role – Male	Sanju	Won	
2020	Zee Cine Awards	Best Actor (Critics)	Uri: The Surgical Strike	Nominated	

== Other awards and recognitions ==
Year	Award	Category	Work	Result	Ref.
2023	Bollywood Hungama Style Icons	Most Stylish Actor (Male)	—N/a	Nominated	
