= Bad Newz =

2024 Indian film by Anand Tiwari

- Theatrical release poster
- Directed by: Anand Tiwari
- Written by: Ishita Moitra; Tarun Dudeja
- Produced by: Karan Johar; Hiroo Yash Johar; Apoorva Mehta; Amritpal Singh Bindra; Anand Tiwari
- Starring: Vicky Kaushal; Triptii Dimri; Ammy Virk
- Cinematography: Debojeet Ray
- Edited by: Shan Mohammed
- Music by: Songs: Rochak Kohli; Vishal Mishra; DJ Chetas-Lijo George; Prem-Hardeep; Karan Aujla; Abhijeet Srivastava; Score: Amar Mohile
- Production companies: Dharma Productions; Leo Media Collective; Amazon Prime
- Distributed by: AA Films
- Release date: 19 July 2024
- Running time: 140 minutes
- Country: India
- Language: Hindi
- Budget: ₹80 crore
- Box office: est. ₹115.74 crore

Bad Newz is a 2024 Indian Hindi-language comedy film directed by Anand Tiwari. Produced by Amazon Prime, Dharma Productions and Leo Media Collective, the film inspired by true events stars Vicky Kaushal, Triptii Dimri, and Ammy Virk. It is a spiritual sequel to Good Newwz (2019), and revolves around heteropaternal superfecundation, a reproductive process in which twins are born to the same mother, but from different biological fathers.

Principal photography took place from March 2022 to July 2023. The film was theatrically released on 19 July 2024. It received mixed reviews from critics and has grossed over ₹115.74 crore (US$12 million) worldwide against a budget of ₹80 crore (US$8.3 million), becoming ninth highest-grossing Hindi film of 2024.

== Plot ==
Saloni Bagga is a chef who dreams of her restaurant winning the Meraki Star. She meets Akhil Chadha and they hit it off immediately and get married soon after. However, soon problems arise in their marriage, one of which causes her restaurant to lose its Meraki star nomination which results in Saloni getting fired from her job. The couple decides to get divorced and Saloni then relocates to Mussoorie to work at a restaurant owned by Gurbir Singh Pannu. After a chain of events, a drunk Saloni ends up having a one-night stand with Gurbir. That same night, Akhil shows up at her door, wanting her back, that results in them having a one-night stand as well.

As a result of these encounters, Saloni gets pregnant. After taking a paternity test to determine the baby's father, she learns that she is pregnant with twins. To make matters worse, she is told by her doctor that due to a very rare phenomenon of heteropaternal superfecundation, the twins have different fathers, who are revealed to be Akhil and Gurbir. This results in hilarious situations where both Akhil and Gurbir try to prove that each is a better partner and father than the other after Saloni decides to keep both babies. During a major family argument, Saloni faints due to overloaded stress. She is admitted to the hospital and the doctor reveals that Gurbir's baby is not growing well while Akhil's baby is growing normally but waiting until the due date will result in Gurbir's baby not surviving. However, in doing so, there is a risk that both babies will not survive.

Akhil selflessly decides to have the twins surgically delivered prematurely, since that would give both babies a chance to survive. Luckily, Saloni delivers two healthy baby girls and is recovering well herself. Post delivery, when she is informed of the selfless decision Akhil made, she is touched. After some time, Saloni's restaurant manages to win a Meraki star, where Gurbir gets back together with his ex-girlfriend Sejal. Saloni asks Akhil to marry her again, which he accepts.

After hearing her crazy story, Ananya Panday decides to play Saloni's role in an upcoming movie regarding her love story.

== Cast ==
- Vicky Kaushal as Akhil Chadha
- Triptii Dimri as Saloni Bagga
- Ammy Virk as Gurbir Singh Pannu
- Neha Dhupia as Ma Corona, Saloni's aunt
- Sheeba Chaddha as Vishni Chadha, Akhil's mother
- Faisal Rashid as Doctor Baweja
- Khayali Ram as Sukhi Mama
- Guneet Singh Sodhi as Harman Sathija
- Kamlesh Sharma as Teji
- Naveen Kaushik as Panama Cafe Manager
- Harnek Singh Aulakh as Amardeep Bagga, Saloni's father
- Vijaylaxmi Singh as Sunita Bagga, Saloni's mother
- Mahabir Singh Bhullar as Darzi
- Shayank Shukla as Golu
- Deepak Anand as Rifleman
- Ananya Panday as Herself (special appearance)
- Neha Sharma as Sejal, Gurbir's ex-girlfriend (cameo appearance)
- Gajraj Rao as Mr. Chadha, Akhil's late father (special appearance)

== Production ==
=== Development ===
The film was announced in March 2024 by Karan Johar which was initially titled Mere Mehboob Mere Sanam, and later changed to Bad Newz. The total budget of the film including marketing stood at ₹80 crore.

=== Filming ===
Principal photography commenced in March 2022. Production was wrapped in July 2023. The song 'Rabb Warga' was shot in exotic locations of Croatia.

== Soundtrack ==
Bad Newz

Soundtrack album by Rochak Kohli, Vishal Mishra, Lijo George - DJ Chetas, Prem-Hardeep, Karan Aujla and Abhijeet Srivastava
- Released: 17 July 2024
- Recorded: 2023–24
- Genre: Feature film soundtrack
- Length: 24:34
- Language: Hindi
- Label: Saregama

Official audio
- Bad Newz (Audio Jukebox) on YouTube

The music of the film is composed by Rochak Kohli, Vishal Mishra, Lijo George-DJ Chetas, Prem-Hardeep, Karan Aujla and Abhijeet Srivastava while the background score is composed by Amar Mohile. The first single titled "Tauba Tauba" was released on 2 July 2024. The second single titled "Jaanam" was released on 9 July 2024. The third single titled "Mere Mehboob Mere Sanam" was a remix of the original song from the 1998 film, Duplicate (originally composed by Anu Malik) and was released on 14 July 2024.

Track listing
| No. | Title | Lyrics | Music | Singer(s) | Length |
|---|---|---|---|---|---|
| 1. | "Tauba Tauba" | Karan Aujla | Karan Aujla | Karan Aujla | 3:27 |
| 2. | "Jaanam" | Vishal Mishra | Vishal Mishra | Vishal Mishra | 3:18 |
| 3. | "Rabb Warga" | Shayra Apoorva | Abhijeet Srivastava | Jubin Nautiyal | 2:35 |
| 4. | "Haule Haule" | Gurpreet Saini, Gautam G. Sharma | Rochak Kohli | Jubin Nautiyal | 3:32 |
| 5. | "Mere Mehboob Mere Sanam" | Javed Akhtar, Lijo George | Lijo George - DJ Chetas, Anu Malik | Udit Narayan, Alka Yagnik | 3:02 |
| 6. | "Raula Raula" | Davvy Singh | Prem-Hardeep | Romy | 2:54 |
| 7. | "Haule Sajna" (Ammy Virk Version) | Gurpreet Saini, Gautam G. Sharma | Rochak Kohli | Ammy Virk, Rochak Kohli | 2:55 |
| 8. | "Rabb Warga" (Neeti Mohan Version) | Shayra Apoorva | Abhijeet Srivastava | Neeti Mohan | 2:51 |
| Total length: | | | | | 24:34 |

== Release ==
=== Theatrical ===
After multiple date changes and other delays, Bad Newz was theatrically released on 19 July 2024.

== Reception ==
=== Box office ===
As of 15 August 2024, Bad Newz has earned over ₹115.74 crore (US$13 million) worldwide with an opening day collection of ₹8.3 crore and a total of ₹44.1 crore over its first weekend. The film went on to collect ₹9 crore in its second weekend and ₹3 crore in its third weekend, contributing to its final worldwide gross of ₹115.74 crore. The film was a commercial failure.

=== Critical reception ===
Bad Newz received mixed reviews from critics. On the review aggregator website Rotten Tomatoes, 27% of 15 critics' reviews are positive, with an average rating of 5.1/10.

Bollywood Hungama gave 4/5 and wrote "On the whole, Bad Newz is a fun-filled entertainer." Dhaval Roy of The Times of India rated the film 3.5 stars out of 5 and wrote "With a hilarious premise and two funny men, this one’s a laugh riot. Even when the plot takes a familiar turn and stretches, the witty dialogues and spot-on comedic timing from the cast ensure you're consistently entertained."

Sukanya Verma of Rediff.com rated 2.5/5 stars and notes "Pretty frames, gorgeously styled actors, easily resolved complex issues, Bad Newz has no wish to rise above its fluff objectives." Shubhra Gupta from The Indian Express rated the film 2.5/5 and wrote "If Bad Newz had stuck to its comedic guns, without resorting to the weepy saccharine bits which take over in the second half, it would have been gold." Saibal Chatterjee of NDTV rated the film at 2/5, saying "It is the absence of genuine crackle in the average, single-note confection that Bad Newz is that does the film in."

== See also ==
- Desperate Lies, Brazilian drama TV series touching on heteropaternal superfecundation
