= Yeah Proof =

Indian Music Producer

Balwinder Singh Sandhu known by his stage name Yeah Proof is an Indian music producer and composer known for his contributions to Punjabi music and hip-hop & Trap. His production in the song Tauba Tauba (song) by Karan Aujla has been a massive hit, and has charted Billboards. He is one of the leading producers in the Punjabi trap and hip-hop scene.Proof has produced several hit tracks and projects, including Aujla's Way Ahead EP (featuring “Gangsta Gangsta” with YG and “Unreachable” with Ikka), Mexico, Let Em’ Play, Tauba Tauba, YKWIM, and Game Over. He has also worked on Divine (rapper)’s Street Dreams album (“Nothing Lasts”, “Straight Ballin”), Raftaar’s “Chora Baba Ka”, Homeboy's debut album Infinite, and the soundtrack of Hardeep Grewal’s film Tunka Tunka. His credits extend to artists such as Arjan Dhillon, Jordan Sandhu, Jaz Dhami, Harnoor, Zehr Vibe, and Ranjit Bawa.

== Production style ==
His production style blends Punjabi melodies with trap beats and global influences, helping shape a modern sound for South Asian hip-hop.
