= Tauba Tauba (song) =

Song performed by Karan Aujla

- Song cover

Song by Karan Aujla

from the album Bad Newz
- Language: Punjabi
- Released: 2 July 2024
- Recorded: 2023
- Length: 3:27
- Label: Saregama
- Composers: Karan Aujla, Tommi Vatanen, Tuomo Korander
- Lyricist: Karan Aujla
- Producer: Yeah Proof

Music video
- "Tauba Tauba" on YouTube

"Tauba Tauba" is a single from the 2024 Hindi film Bad Newz, written and sung by Karan Aujla, composed by Tommi Vatanen and Tuomo Korander, and was picturised on Aujla, along with Vicky Kaushal. The song received a positive reception becoming one of the most popular songs of the year. The song peaked at #1 on Billboard India, and UK Asian charts.

== Composition and music video ==
The lyrics for the song were written by Karan Aujla who also sang the song. It was choreographed by Bosco–Caesar. The costume was designed by Samidha Wangnoo, who also did the costumes for the film.

"Tauba Tauba" is a party song that is picturised upon Vicky Kaushal, along with Aujla. The song marks Aujla and Kaushal's first-ever collaboration and also marks the Bollywood debut of Aujla.

== Reception ==
Joginder Tuteja of Bollywood Hungama said that "the beats are such that you can't but groove to them. Rest is taken care of by Vicky Kaushal's dance steps that led to thousands of reels floating around all over the social media." Richa Mukherjee of NDTV wrote, "In the song, Vicky Kaushal and Karan Aujla look cool in shades and exude swag and charm with their moves. While Triptii Dimri looks stunning as ever." Neeshita Nyayapati of Hindustan Times called the song a "peppy dance number" and said "Vicky shows off his moves in a dark suit while Triptii looks smouldering in a gold dress."

"Tauba Tauba" peaked at #1 on Billboard India, and UK Asian charts. The song entered the Billboard Canadian Hot 100 at the 25th position in July 2024. As of January 2025, it has been viewed over 500 million times on YouTube and more than 200 millions of streams worldwide.

== Charts ==
Chart performance for "Tauba Tauba"
Chart (2024)	Peak position
Canada (Canadian Hot 100)	25
Global 200 (Billboard)	68
MENA (IFPI)	10
New Zealand Hot Singles (RMNZ)	8
UAE (IFPI)	1
UK Singles Sales (OCC)	88
