= Rajiv Gandhi Institute of Technology, Mumbai =

Private engineering college in Mumbai

Rajiv Gandhi Institute of Technology (RGIT)
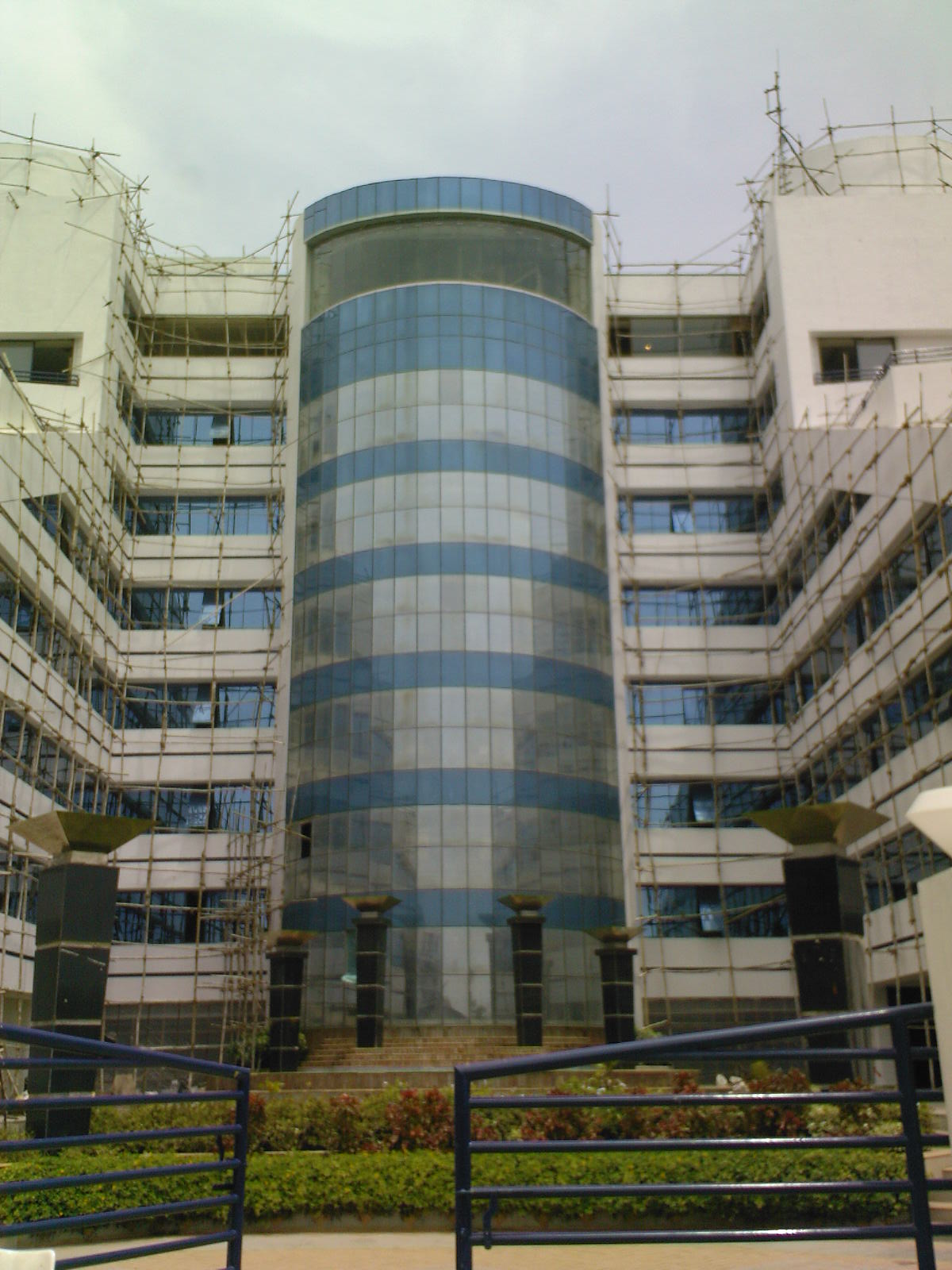
- Entrance to the RGIT
- Motto: ज्ञानं परमं ध्येयम्
- Motto in English: Knowledge is the ultimate aim
- Type: Private
- Established: 1992; 34 years ago
- Accreditation: AICTE
- Academic affiliations: University of Mumbai
- Principal: Sanjay U. Bokade
- Academic staff: 147
- Undergraduates: 1920
- Location: Andheri, Mumbai, Maharashtra, India; 19.1230°N 72.8237°E
- Campus: Suburban
- Website: mctrgit.ac.in

The Rajiv Gandhi Institute of Technology (RGIT) is a private engineering college affiliated to the University of Mumbai. Founded in 1992, the institute is located in Andheri (west), Mumbai, India. The college is run by the Manjara Charitable Trust and was accredited by the All India Council for Technical Education (AICTE). It is recognised by the Directorate of Technical Education in Maharashtra and the UGC.

== Programs offered ==
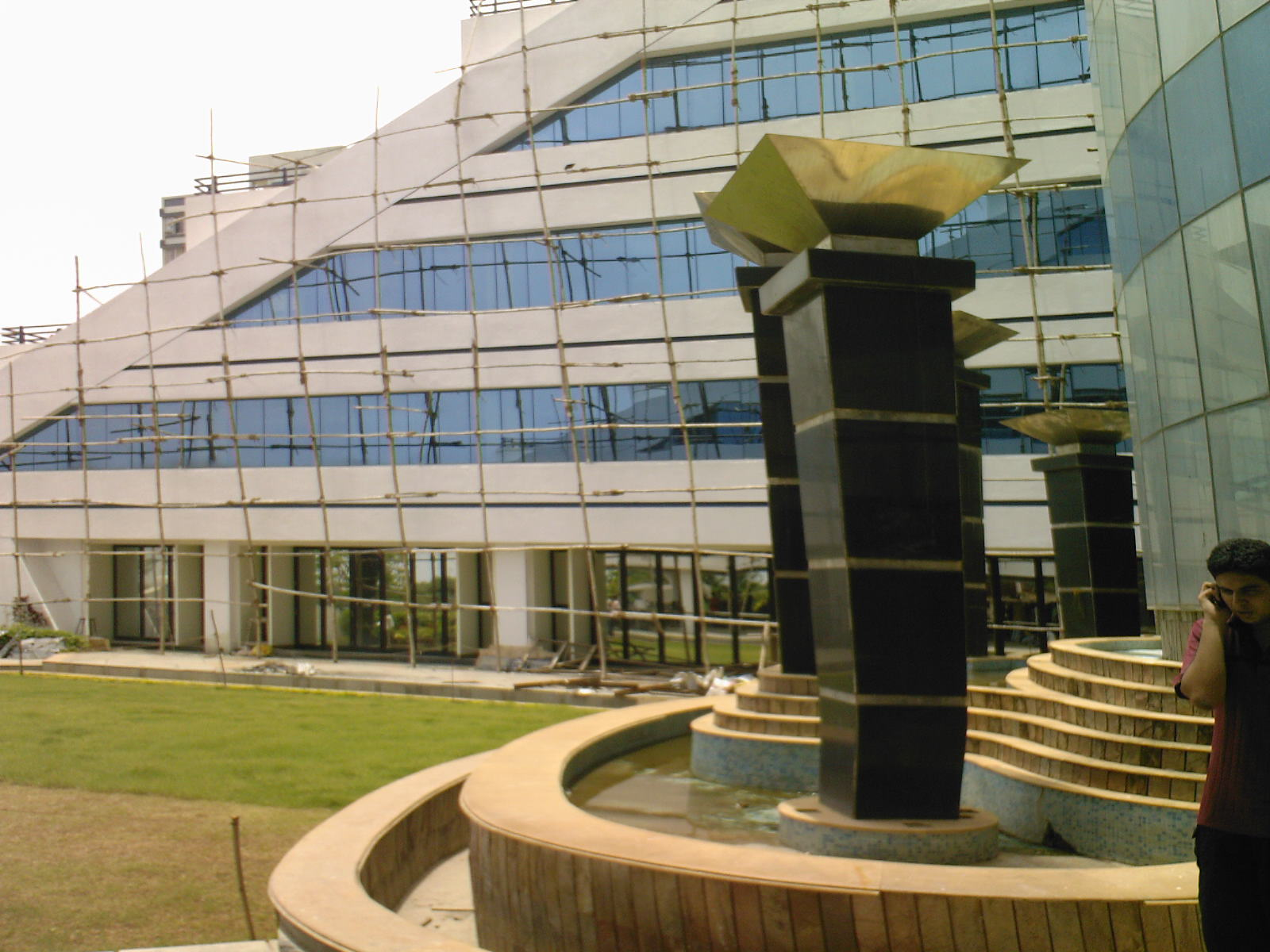
Lawn and fountains at RGIT.

RGIT offers the Bachelor of Engineering (B.E) undergraduate course, which is its flagship course, in seven disciplines. The following degree programs are offered at RGIT, conferred by the University of Mumbai:

- Undergraduate Bachelor of Engineering (B.E.):
  - Computer Engineering
  - Information Technology
  - Artificial Intelligence & Data Science
  - Mechanical Engineering
  - Electronics & Telecommunication Engineering
- Graduate Master of Engineering (M.E.):
  - Computer Engineering
  - Mechanical Engineering
  - Electronics & Telecommunication Engineering
- Doctoral Ph.D.:
  - Computer Engineering
  - Mechanical Engineering
  - Electronics & Telecommunication Engineering

== Extra-curricular activities ==
=== College festival ===
"Zodiac", an inter-collegiate and techno-cultural festival, was started in 2005. Rock concerts, gaming events, the prom night, dance workshops and similar events are held during Zodiac. A technical festival called "Icarus" is generally held in October every year.

The department of Mechanical Engineering hosts "Innovision", an annual technical festival held at the national level, where hardware projects are displayed. "Dimension 5" is a festival conducted by the department of Electronics and Telecommunications Engineering. The Institute also have Social wings and Philanthropic Committees like SOCH RGIT and UBA RGIT for the betterment of welfare.

=== Clubs and societies ===
Marathi Bhasha Mandal (Marathi Language Society) was founded for the promotion of Marathi in the college. RGAA (Rajiv Gandhi Alumni Association) was formed in 2007. MESA (Mechanical Engineering Students' Association) formed in 2002 and has been an active departmental committee throughout the year. IEEE student branch is a technical society for students of all branches and is one of the most active student bodies of the college. Computer Engineering Student's Society (CESS) is the departmental committee of Computer Branch and it conducts various technical workshops and seminars under itself as well as under Association for Computing Machinery (ACM) Student's Chapter. Institute Of Electronics And Telecommunication Engineering (IETE) Student Forum is the departmental committee for Electronics and Telecommunication Department (EXTC). Various technical and non-technical workshops are conducted under it throughout the year. The student's council is the student body elected by the Principal and Student Conveyors annually to organize the festivals 'Icarus' and 'Zodiac'. ABIT(Association of Budding Technocrats) is the departmental committee of IT branch and it conducts various activities, seminars and workshops. In the year 2024 ABIT hosted "SYNERGY" an inter-collegiate and techno-cultural festival.

ISA student body is a department specific technical team for instrumentation students.

The college also has drama, fashion and dance clubs. The drama club is also known as 'MUKHAVTE ACJN'. All of these have best working experience and extra co-curriculum .

== Co-curricular activities ==
Memberships of professional societies such as ISA, IEEE, CSI, ABIT, SAE, IETE and ASME are offered to students. MESA (Mechanical Engineering Students Association) was founded in RGIT in 2009.

== Notable alumni ==
- Vicky Kaushal
- Ravi Dubey
- Tejasswi Prakash
- Anshumaan Pushkar
- Piyush Dhamalu
- Dhir Lodi
