= Shoojit Sircar =

Indian filmmaker (born 1967)

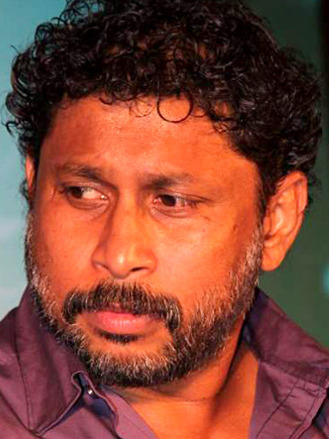
- Sircar at an event for Vicky Donor in 2012
- Born: 16 September 1967 (age 59); Kolkata, West Bengal, India
- Education: Shaheed Bhagat Singh College
- Occupations: Director, producer
- Spouse: Jhuma Sircar
- Children: 2

Shoojit Sircar (born c. 1966–1967) is an Indian filmmaker, director and producer known for his work in Hindi films. He has received several awards, including three National Film Awards and two Filmfare Awards from five nominations.

Sircar made his directorial debut with the romantic war drama Yahaan (2005). He achieved critical success with the top-grossing social romantic comedy Vicky Donor (2012) for which he received the National Film Award for Best Popular Film Providing Wholesome Entertainment. He followed it a year later with the political action thriller Madras Cafe (2013).

His next film Piku (2015) received widespread critical acclaim upon release and emerged as a major box-office success, and earned him the Filmfare Award for Best Film (Critics). His home production, the legal thriller Pink (2016), won the National Film Award for Best Film on Other Social Issues. Sircar subsequently directed and produced the coming-of-age drama October (2018) and the Amazon Prime Video's comedy Gulabo Sitabo (2020). Sircar gained further prominence in 2021 with the biographical historical drama Sardar Udham which received widespread critical acclaim. He is also the co-founder of the film production company Rising Sun Films. I Want to Talk (2025) earned him again the Filmfare Award for Best Film (Critics).

== Early and personal life ==
Sircar was born into a Bengali family in Kolkata, in the Indian state of West Bengal. He completed his schooling from Kendriya Vidyalaya Barrackpore Airforce in 1985 and graduated with a Bachelor of Commerce from Shaheed Bhagat Singh College at the University of Delhi. Sircar lost both his parents in 2004; his father died due to cancer and his mother from a brain stroke.

In his early years, he worked as an accountant at Le Meridien hotel in Delhi as well advertisement industry. He aspired for a career in films after attending the International Film Festival of India in Delhi. He credits the American documentary film Dear America: Letters Home from Vietnam and Satyajit Ray's Pather Panchali as the two films that inspired him to start a career in cinema. In the early 1990s, Sircar formed a theatre group named Act One, which had as troupe members Manoj Bajpayee, Piyush Mishra and Ashish Vidyarthi.

Sircar is married to Jhuma Sircar, and a parent to two daughters, Koyna and Anannya Sircar. He lives with his family in Kolkata. Sircar is also a football enthusiast and is part of the All Stars Football Club, a celebrity football club that raises money for charity.

== Career ==
=== Early work (2005–2012) ===
Sircar made his directorial debut in 2005 with the romantic war drama Yahaan, which featured Jimmy Sheirgill and Minissha Lamba in a love story set in war-savaged Kashmir. The film received mixed critical reviews and poor box-office revenues upon release. His second film, titled Shoebite, starring Amitabh Bachchan remains unreleased as of 2023 due to a copyright legal battle between Percept Picture Company and UTV Motion Pictures.

The debacle related to Shoebite led Sircar to establish his own film production company in 2007 with Ronnie Lahiri, naming it Rising Sun Films, under which all of his directorial films would be made. Sircar's first home production was the Bengali-language drama film Aparajita Tumi (2012) which was directed by Aniruddha Roy Chowdhury.

=== Breakthrough and widespread success (2012–2020) ===
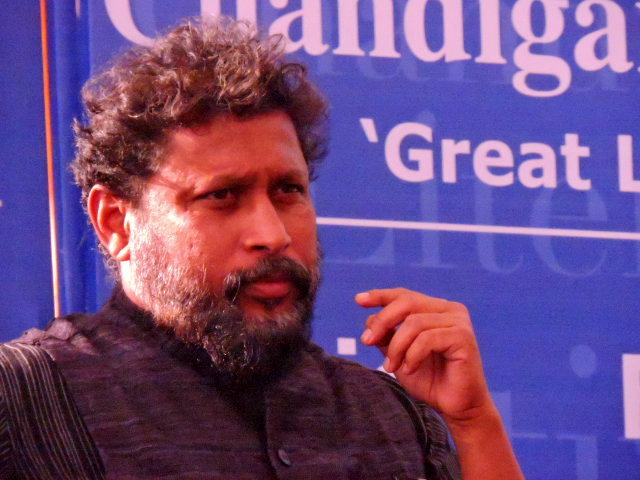
Shoojit Sircar at Chandigarh Literature Festival 2016, India

Sircar rose to prominence in 2012 with the critically and commercially successful social romantic comedy Vicky Donor. It marked the Hindi film debut of Ayushmann Khurrana and Yami Gautam. The film, set against the background of sperm donation and infertility within a Bengali-Punjabi household grossed ₹66.32 crore worldwide, against a budget of ₹15 crore. It won the National Film Award for Best Popular Film Providing Wholesome Entertainment, in addition to his first nominations for the Filmfare Award for Best Film and Best Director. Sircar stated that he made the film because he wanted to explore "a light-hearted look at the taboo attached to infertility and artificial insemination." Before filming began, he researched the plot themes for over three years. The film was remade in Telugu as Naruda Donoruda (2016), and in Tamil as Dharala Prabhu (2020).

He followed it up a year later with the political action thriller Madras Cafe starring John Abraham, Nargis Fakhri alongside newcomer Raashi Khanna in lead roles. Set during the time of Indian intervention in the Sri Lankan civil war and assassination of Indian prime minister Rajiv Gandhi, the film received positive reviews from critics upon release. Rajeev Masand of CNN-IBN noted that "Unlike, in the West, it's hard to make films on real-life historical events in India. Political pressures and sensitive groups invariably throw a spanner in the works. Which is why it's commendable what director Shoojit Sircar has undertaken with Madras Café."

In 2015, Sircar directed and produced the comedy-drama Piku. Starring Deepika Padukone as the titular protagonist, alongside Amitabh Bachchan, Irrfan Khan and Moushumi Chatterjee, the film is loosely based on the 1980 Bengali-language short film Pikoo by Satyajit Ray. It garnered widespread critical acclaim upon release and emerged as a major commercial success. The film earned Sircar the Filmfare Award for Best Film (Critics), in addition to his second Best Film and Best Director nominations at the same ceremony. The same year, Sircar produced the Bengali language film Open Tee Bioscope.

His next home production and screenwriting venture was Pink (2016), a Hindi-language legal thriller featuring an ensemble cast including Taapsee Pannu, Kirti Kulhari, Andrea Tariang and Amitabh Bachchan in lead roles. The film received widespread critical acclaim upon release and emerged as a surprising commercial success at the box-office. Pink won Sircar the National Film Award for Best Film on Other Social Issues.

Sircar's next venture was the coming-of-age drama October (2018), which follows the life of a hotel-management intern (played by Varun Dhawan) who takes care of his comatose fellow intern (Banita Sandhu) in an unconditional and unconventional manner. Upon its release, the filmmakers were accused of plagiarising Aarti – The Unknown Love Story, a Marathi film directed by Sarika Mene. Screenwriters Association reviewed the case and found some similarities between the two films. However, it was eventually cleared of all charges. October received widespread critical acclaim upon release and emerged as a moderate commercial success at the box-office.

Sircar then reunited with Bachchan and Khurrana in the 2020 comedy-drama Gulabo Sitabo. Due to the COVID-19 pandemic, the film was one of the first Bollywood films to be released directly on Amazon Prime Video worldwide. The film earned Sircar his third nomination for the Filmfare Award for Best Director.

=== Sardar Udham and beyond (2021–present) ===
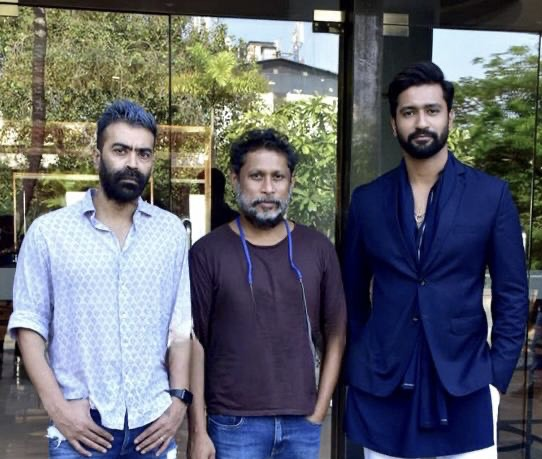
Sircar promoting Sardar Udham with Vicky Kaushal (right) and Ronnie Lahiri (left)

Sircar's prominence increased in 2021 with the biographical historical drama Sardar Udham starring Vicky Kaushal in the titular role. Based on the life of Udham Singh, a freedom fighter from Punjab who assassinated Michael O'Dwyer in London to avenge the 1919 Jallianwala Bagh massacre in Amritsar, the film had a direct-to-digital premiere through Amazon Prime Video during the Dusshera weekend. Shoojit wanted to make a film of the life of Udham Singh during his college days, and planned to produce it in his mid-1990s, but the research work on the freedom fighter took him two long decades. Sardar Udham received widespread critical acclaim upon release. Saibal Chatterjee of NDTV stated "There is a phenomenal degree of craft in Sardar Udham but none of it is employed for mere effect. There is great deal of soul, too, in this magnificently crafted film." The film earned Sircar his second Filmfare Award for Best Film (Critics), in addition to his fourth Best Director nomination at the same ceremony. Sardar Udham was listed by several publications as one of the best Bollywood films of the year.

In 2024, he directed I Want to Talk, starring Abhishek Bachchan in the lead role, as Arjun Sen, a cancer survivor facing life-altering surgery as well as navigating a complex relationship with his daughter since her childhood. Despite receiving positive reviews from critics, the film emerged as a box-office-bomb, earning only ₹12.5 million at the box office.

== Filmography ==
Year	Film	Director	Producer	Language
2005	Yahaan	Yes	No	Hindi
2012	Aparajita Tumi	No	Yes	Bengali
2012	Vicky Donor	Yes	No	Hindi
2013	Madras Cafe	Yes	Yes	Hindi
2015	Piku	Yes	No	Hindi
2015	Open Tee Bioscope	No	Yes	Bengali
2016	Pink	No	Yes	Hindi
2017	Running Shaadi	No	Yes	Hindi
2018	October	Yes	No	Hindi
2020	Gulabo Sitabo	Yes	Yes	Hindi
2021	Sardar Udham	Yes	Yes	Hindi
2021	Deep6	No	Yes	Bengali
2024	Woh Bhi Din The	No	Yes	Hindi
2024	I Want to Talk	Yes	Yes	Hindi
2027	Ek Jaadugar	Yes	Yes	Hindi

== Accolades ==
Year	Notable work	Awards	Category	Result	Ref.
2013	Vicky Donor	National Film Awards	Best Popular Film Providing Wholesome Entertainment	Won	
2013	Vicky Donor	Filmfare Awards	Best Director	Nominated	
2013	Vicky Donor	Stardust Awards	Best Director	Won	
2013	Vicky Donor	Screen Awards	Best Director	Nominated	
2013	Vicky Donor	Producers Guild Film Awards	Best Director	Nominated	
2013	Vicky Donor	Times of India Film Awards	Best Director	Nominated	
2013	Vicky Donor	International Indian Film Academy Awards	Best Director	Nominated	
2014	Madras Cafe	BIG Star Entertainment Awards	Most Entertaining Social Drama Film	Nominated	
2014	Madras Cafe	BIG Star Entertainment Awards	Most Entertaining Thriller Film	Nominated	
2014	Madras Cafe	Screen Awards	Ramnath Goenka Memorial Award	Won	
2014	Madras Cafe	Screen Awards	Best Director	Won	
2014	Madras Cafe	Screen Awards	Best Film	Nominated	
2014	Madras Cafe	Zee Cine Awards	Best Screenplay	Nominated	
2016	Piku	Filmfare Awards	Best Film (Critics)	Won	
2016	Piku	Filmfare Awards	Best Director	Nominated	
2016	Piku	Indian Film Festival of Melbourne	Best Director	Won	
2016	Piku	Indian Film Festival of Russia	Best Director	Won	
2016	Piku	Jagran Film Festival	Best Director	Won	
2016	Piku	International Indian Film Academy Awards	Best Director	Nominated	
2016	Piku	Producers Guild Film Awards	Best Director	Nominated	
2016	Piku	Times of India Film Awards	Best Director	Nominated	
2016	Piku	Zee Cine Awards	Best Director	Nominated	
2017	Pink	National Film Awards	Best Film on Social Issues	Won	
2017	Pink	Screen Awards	Best Film	Won	
2017	Pink	Indian Film Festival of Melbourne	Best Film	Won	
2017	Pink	Zee Cine Awards	Best Film (Critics)	Won	
2017	Pink	Zee Cine Awards	Best Film	Nominated	
2017	Pink	Filmfare Awards	Best Film	Nominated	
2017	Pink	Stardust Awards	Best Film	Nominated	
2017	Pink	AACTA Awards	Best Asian Film	Nominated	
2018	October	Indian Film Festival of Melbourne	Best Director	Nominated	
2021	Gulabo Sitabo	Filmfare Awards	Best Director	Nominated	
2022	Sardar Udham	Filmfare Awards	Best Director	Nominated	
2022	Sardar Udham	Filmfare Awards	Best Film (Critics)	Won	
2023	Sardar Udham	National Film Awards	Best Feature Film in Hindi	Won	
2025	I Want to Talk	70th Filmfare Awards	Best Film (Critics)	Won	
