= Vicky Kaushal =

Indian actor (born 1988)

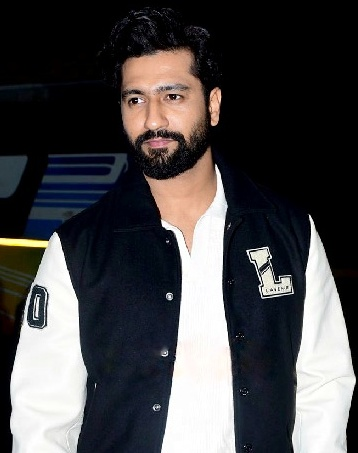
- Kaushal in 2023
- Born: 16 May 1988 (age 38); Bombay, Maharashtra, India
- Education: Rajiv Gandhi Technical Institute
- Occupation: Actor
- Years active: 2012–present
- Spouse: Katrina Kaif (m. 2021)
- Children: 1
- Relatives: Kaushal family
- Awards: Full list

Vicky Kaushal (pronounced [ˈʋɪkːi ˈkɔːʃəl]; born 16 May 1988) is an Indian actor who works in Hindi films. He is the recipient of several accolades, including a National Film Award and three Filmfare Awards, and has appeared in Forbes India's Celebrity 100 list of 2019.

After graduating with an engineering degree from Rajiv Gandhi Institute of Technology, Kaushal began his career by assisting Anurag Kashyap in the crime drama Gangs of Wasseypur (2012) and played minor roles in films. His first leading role was in the independent drama Masaan (2015), following which he starred in Kashyap's psychological thriller Raman Raghav 2.0 (2016). Kaushal gained wider recognition in 2018 with supporting roles in the top-grossing dramas Raazi and Sanju, winning the Filmfare Award for Best Supporting Actor for the latter.

His role as an army officer in the 2019 war film Uri: The Surgical Strike established Kaushal as a leading actor and won him the National Film Award for Best Actor. He earned further praise for his portrayal of Udham Singh in the biopic Sardar Udham (2021), winning the Filmfare Critics Award for Best Actor, and had commercial success in 2023 in the romantic comedy Zara Hatke Zara Bachke, the biopic Sam Bahadur and the comedy-drama Dunki. The last of these won him another Filmfare Award for Best Supporting Actor. The 2025 historical action film Chhaava, in which he portrayed Sambhaji, emerged as his highest-grossing release.

In addition to his acting career, Kaushal endorses several brands and products, and has co-hosted and performed at award ceremonies. He is married to actress Katrina Kaif, with whom he has a son.

== Early life and background ==
Kaushal was born on 16 May 1988 in a suburban chawl in Mumbai to Sham Kaushal, an action director in Indian films, and Veena Kaushal, a homemaker. His younger brother, Sunny, is also an actor. His family is Punjabi Hindu with their ancestral roots in Hoshiarpur, Punjab. Kaushal has described himself as a "regular kid who was interested in studying, playing cricket and watching movies". His father was keen on his son having a stable career away from show-business and thus, he graduated with a bachelor's degree in electrical engineering from Rajiv Gandhi Institute of Technology in 2009.

During an industrial visit to an IT company in his graduation year, he realised that he had no real interest in an office job and began aspiring to have a career in film. He studied acting at Kishore Namit Kapoor's academy while simultaneously participating in theatre with Manav Kaul's Aranya group and Naseeruddin Shah's Motley Productions; doing everything from backstage and announcements to stand-ins. Kaushal would spend the next two years going for various kinds of auditions, but did not get any good opportunities. His first attempt at acting was in a theatrical production titled Laal Pencil in 2011.

Kaushal started his career in films by working as an assistant director to Anurag Kashyap in the two-part crime drama Gangs of Wasseypur (2012). Kaushal has described fond memories of working with Kashyap, whom he considers as his mentor. He then played minor roles in Kashyap's productions Luv Shuv Tey Chicken Khurana (2012) and Bombay Velvet (2015), and the short film Geek Out (2013).

== Career ==
=== Early work in independent films (2015–2016) ===
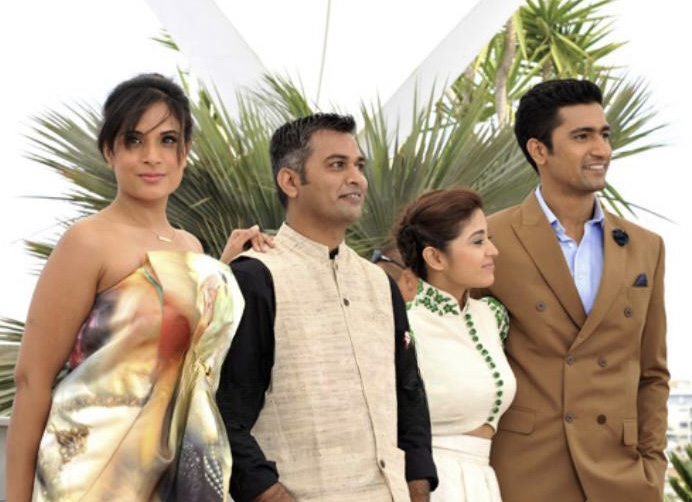
Kaushal with the team of Masaan at the 2015 Cannes Film Festival

Kaushal's first leading role was in the independent drama Masaan (2015), directed by Neeraj Ghaywan. Kaushal and Ghaywan were both assistants on Gangs of Wasseypur, and he was cast through an audition after Rajkummar Rao backed out. To play a young man from a low socio-economic class yearning for a better life, Kaushal spent time in Benaras, where the film is set, and observed the mannerisms of local men. The film was screened in the Un Certain Regard segment at the 2015 Cannes Film Festival, where it won two awards, including the FIPRESCI Prize. Masaan earned critical acclaim and The New York Times considered it to be a leading example of increased realism in Indian cinema. Nikhil Taneja of HuffPost termed Kaushal's performance "poignant and memorable" and Anuj Kumar of The Hindu wrote that "he effortlessly conveys both the inferiority complex and the attitude of breaking through the caste cauldron". His performance won him the IIFA and Screen Award for Best Male Debut, and a nomination for the Asian Film Award for Best Newcomer, among other accolades.

The drama Zubaan, which Kaushal had filmed before Masaan, was screened at the 2015 Busan International Film Festival. His role was that of a grieving man who starts stammering after the suicide of his father. He worked with a speech therapist to learn stammering patterns and spent time with some of the doctor's patients. After completing work on the film, Kaushal found it difficult to distance from the character and began to stammer in real life. His performance led Justin Chang of Variety to label him a "charismatic, naturally engaging talent". In Kashyap's psychological thriller Raman Raghav 2.0 (2016), Kaushal played a chain-smoking, drug-addicted police officer in pursuit of a serial killer portrayed by Nawazuddin Siddiqui. The troubled and unbalanced character had little in common with Kaushal's own personality, and to convince Kashyap to cast him, he lived in isolation for five days and kept repeating lines from the script. He also severely dehydrated himself and smoked heavily, impacting his health. Kaushal chose the role because he was eager to avoid typecasting from his first two films. The film premiered at the 2016 Cannes Film Festival, in the Directors' Fortnight section to a positive response. Writing for Rediff.com, Aseem Chhabra found Kaushal's performance "brave" and "surprising".

=== Breakthrough (2018–2020) ===
Kaushal achieved his breakthrough in 2018. He played the male lead of the romantic comedy Love per Square Foot, India's first original film from Netflix. Shweta Ramakrishnan of Firstpost considered the chemistry between Kaushal and his co-star Angira Dhar to be the film's highlight. It was screened at the Beijing International Film Festival later in 2019. Kaushal next featured in Meghna Gulzar's spy thriller Raazi (2018), based on Harinder Sikka's novel Calling Sehmat. Set during the Indo-Pakistani War of 1971, the film tells the real-life story of a young Indian spy (played by Alia Bhatt) who marries a Pakistani army officer (Kaushal). He was drawn to the humanity he found in the story and worked towards conveying both vulnerability and authoritative strength in his character. Meena Iyer of Daily News and Analysis commended Kaushal for being "the correct foil" to Bhatt's character.

Kaushal's biggest commercial success of 2018 came with Rajkumar Hirani's Sanju, a biopic of the troubled actor Sanjay Dutt, who was portrayed by Ranbir Kapoor in the film. Kaushal played his best friend Kamli, a fictionalised amalgamation of various real-life friends of Dutt. In preparation, he spent time with Paresh Ghelani, who served as the primary inspiration for the role. Samrudhi Ghosh of India Today wrote that he "holds his own against Ranbir's superlative performance, and shines in the funny as well as emotional scenes". Both Raazi and Sanju proved to be among the highest-grossing Hindi films of 2018, and with earnings of over ₹5.79 billion (US$62 million), the latter ranks among Indian cinema's biggest grossers. For Sanju, Kaushal won the Filmfare Award for Best Supporting Actor (tied with Gajraj Rao for Badhaai Ho).

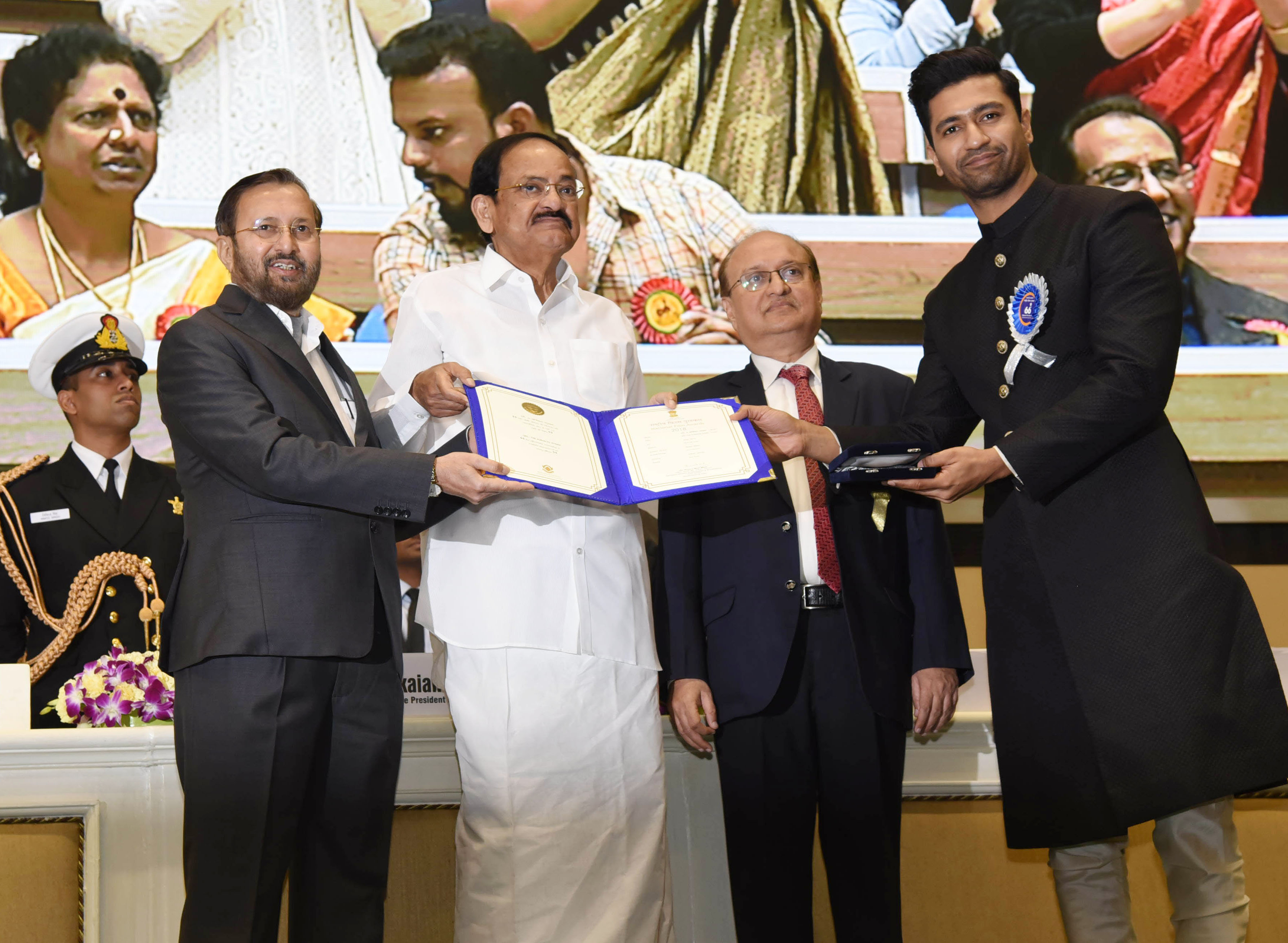
Kaushal receiving the National Film Award for Best Actor for his performance in Uri: The Surgical Strike (2019)

Kaushal's second Netflix production of the year was the anthology film Lust Stories. It consists of four short films dealing with female sexuality; Kaushal was seen in Karan Johar's segment as a newly married man who fails to recognise his wife's (played by Kiara Advani) sexual dissatisfaction. In his final release of the year, Kaushal reunited with Kashyap for Manmarziyaan, a love triangle set in Punjab, co-starring Taapsee Pannu and Abhishek Bachchan. Kaushal played the role of Vicky Sandhu, a local DJ whose commitment issues lead to conflict in his romantic relationship with Pannu's character. The film premiered at the 2018 Toronto International Film Festival and met with positive critical reception. Anupama Chopra took note of how well he used silences to convey his character's pain and desire. Shilpa Jamkhandikar of Reuters found him to be "at once petulant, childlike and suddenly cheerful, bringing a vulnerability to Vicky that saves him from being the villain of the piece."

In 2019, Kaushal starred as a military officer in Uri: The Surgical Strike, an action film based on the 2016 Uri attack, directed by Aditya Dhar and filmed in Serbia. To prepare, he gained muscle weight, practised a ketogenic diet, and underwent five months of military training and mixed martial arts sessions. He injured his arm while filming an action sequence in it. Uday Bhatia of Mint found Kaushal to be a "fetching stoic lead" but bemoaned the lack of depth in his character. Rajeev Masand took note of the film's jingoism but opined that Kaushal "brings both the bulked-up physicality and the sort of steely determination that the part requires". Uri earned over ₹3.5 billion (US$37 million) worldwide, making it the biggest-grossing film with Kaushal in a leading role, at that point. Kaushal was awarded with the National Film Award for Best Actor (shared with Ayushmann Khurrana for Andhadhun) and received his first nomination for the Filmfare Award for Best Actor.

A year later, Kaushal starred in the horror film Bhoot – Part One: The Haunted Ship (2020), as a grief-stricken shipping officer. He suffered an accident during the filming of an action sequence and fractured his cheekbone. Saibal Chatterjee of NDTV found Kaushal to be "earnest" in a film he dismissed as a "horrific misfire".

=== Career progression (2021–2024) ===
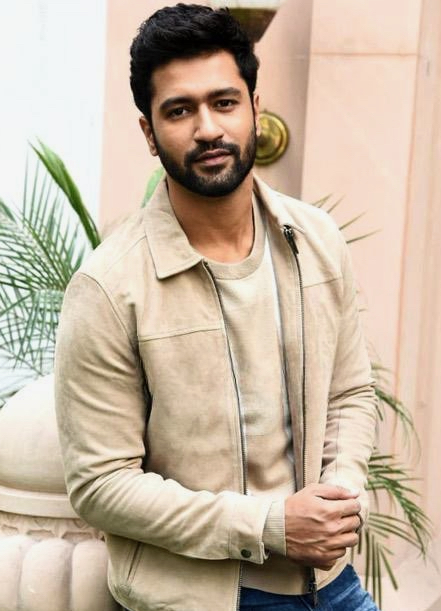
Kaushal promoting Sardar Udham in 2021

Kaushal's sole release in 2021 was Shoojit Sircar's Sardar Udham which premiered digitally on Amazon Prime Video after multiple delays due to the COVID-19 pandemic. The film is based on the life of Udham Singh, a freedom fighter who assassinated Michael O'Dwyer as revenge for his role in the Jallianwala Bagh massacre of 1919. In order to play the younger version of his character, who was 19 years old at the time of the massacre, Kaushal lost over 15 kilograms of weight within two months. The film received critical acclaim, particularly for Kaushal's performance, with Chatterjee calling it his best performance to date. Subhash K. Jha of Firstpost shared the same opinion, adding "Kaushal's Udham Singh is a performance laced with grace, tinged with bitterness, and defined by a dormant rage". For his performance, Kaushal won the IIFA Award for Best Actor and the Filmfare Critics Award for Best Actor, in addition to his second nomination for the Filmfare Award for Best Actor.

Keen to work in a light-hearted film after the "emotionally exhausting" experience of Sardar Udham, Kaushal starred as a struggling dancer accused of murder in the comic thriller Govinda Naam Mera (2022). It received a streaming release on Disney+ Hotstar. Despite disliking the film, India Today's Tushar Joshi was appreciative of Kaushal's against-type comic performance in a masala film. The following year, Kaushal starred opposite Sara Ali Khan in Laxman Utekar's romantic comedy Zara Hatke Zara Bachke, about a small-town couple seeking privacy in their joint-family household. Scroll.in's Nandini Ramnath opined that Kaushal "turns on the lovey-dovey charm and has a moving scene-stealing moment all to himself, which gives Zara Hatke Zara Bachke a semblance of a purpose". It marked his first film to release theatrically since Bhoot – Part One in 2020. Against expectations, it emerged as a commercial success.

Kaushal took another part of a small-town man in the family film The Great Indian Family (2023), saying that he enjoyed the process of portraying middle-class aspirations and simplicity. Reviewers for Hindustan Times and The Quint took note of how much his performance enhanced a mediocre film. It had minuscule box-office collections. In his second collaboration with Meghna Gulzar, Kaushal portrayed India's first field marshal, Sam Manekshaw in the biopic Sam Bahadur. Kaushal and Gulzar were keen to make the film historically accurate without taking many creative liberties. To portray Manekshaw in his less-documented younger years, Kaushal relied on meetings with Manekshaw's grandson. Critic Shubhra Gupta commended Kaushal for playing Mankeshaw "without becoming a caricature". It was a commercial success. Kaushal had a brief role (billed as a special appearance) in Hirani's comedy-drama Dunki, starring Shah Rukh Khan and Pannu. A reviewer for Film Companion believed that his appearance had greatly benefitted the film. Kaushal received further Filmfare nominations for his performances in Sam Bahadur and Dunki, winning Best Supporting Actor for the latter.

In 2024, Kaushal starred alongside Triptii Dimri and Ammy Virk in Bad Newz, a comedy about heteropaternal superfecundation. Taking note of his comic timing, News18's Titas Chowdhury wrote that he "single-handedly tries to elevate this middling script". A song from the film, "Tauba Tauba", featuring Kaushal, gained popularity. Bad Newz emerged as a moderate commercial success.

=== Rise to prominence (2025–present) ===
Kaushal portrayed Maratha Chhatrapati Sambhaji in Utekar's 2025 historical action film Chhaava. To prepare, he trained in sword, stick and spear fighting, gained 25 kg (55 lb) of body weight and learnt Marathi. To enhance the intensity of their on-screen rivalry, Kaushal and Akshaye Khanna (who played the antagonist Aurangzeb) avoided interacting with each other during filming. Hindustan Times' Rishabh Suri was appreciative of Kaushal's commitment to the role and his body language, but was displeased with the "excessive superherofication of the Maratha ruler". Grossing over ₹7.9 billion (US$84 million), Chhaava emerged as Kaushal's biggest grosser, as well as the second highest-grossing Hindi film of 2025 and one of the highest grossing Hindi films of all time. Certain media outlets credited the film's success with establishing Kaushal as one of the leading stars of a new generation in Hindi cinema.

Kaushal will next co-star with Ranbir Kapoor and Alia Bhatt in Sanjay Leela Bhansali's romantic drama Love & War, which is scheduled for release in 2027. He will portray Lord Parashurama in Amar Kaushik's Mahavatar.

== Personal life ==
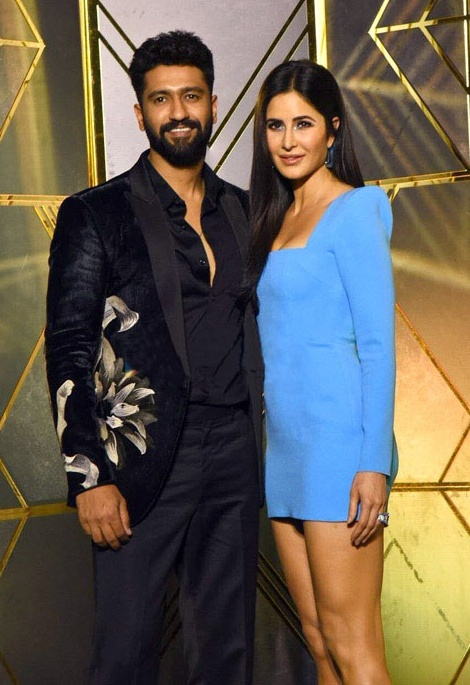
Kaushal with his wife Katrina Kaif in 2022

Although Kaushal is known for his media-friendly attitude, he has been guarded about discussing his relationships. He was first linked to actress Harleen Sethi in 2018. Their break up was reported by the media in early 2019. Kaushal married actress Katrina Kaif on 9 December 2021 in a traditional Hindu ceremony at Six Senses Resort, Fort Barwara in Sawai Madhopur, Rajasthan whom he first met in early 2019. The wedding attracted substantial media coverage in India.

The couple welcomed their first child, a son named Vihaan Kaushal on 7 November 2025.

== Off-screen work ==
In addition to his acting career, Kaushal has hosted and performed at numerous televised awards shows, including the Filmfare, Zee Cine, and Screen Awards. He also performed at Femina Miss India's 2019 grand finale. He is a celebrity spokesperson of several brands and products, including Havells, Reliance Trends, and Oppo, charging ₹20 million (US$210,000)—₹30 million (US$320,000) annually per brand. Kaushal is also the brand ambassador for Pearson in India.

Kaushal is also active in charity work and supports a number of causes associated with environmental protection and women's rights. He appeared alongside other celebrities in a music video, produced by the United Nations and the Ministry of Environment, Forest and Climate Change to spread awareness regarding air pollution. He also lent his support to a 2018 Radio City initiative to help with environmental and infrastructure issues in Mumbai and spent a day filling potholes. Kaushal was one of the speakers at the 2018 edition of We The Women festival by journalist Barkha Dutt and UN Women for women’s empowerment where he spoke in support of the MeToo movement in India. In 2019, he participated in the fourth edition of the Nashik Marathon for gender equality and women's safety.

Kaushal extended his support to a football training program for children belonging to low-income families named "Just For Kicks" in 2017. In 2019, he visited sepoys in Tawang in Arunachal Pradesh as part of NDTV's reality program Jai Jawan. For Diwali that year, he visited Tata Memorial Centre to celebrate the festival with cancer patients and distribute gifts. During the COVID-19 pandemic in India in 2020, he contributed ₹1 crore to the PM CARES Fund and Maharashtra Chief Minister's Relief Fund and collaborated with the NGO GiveIndia on a fundraiser to provide ration kits to daily wage workers. Kaushal also donated ₹2.5 lakhs to the Cine and TV Artistes Association (CINTAA) to help artists who were financially effected by the second wave of the pandemic in 2021.

== Artistry and public image ==
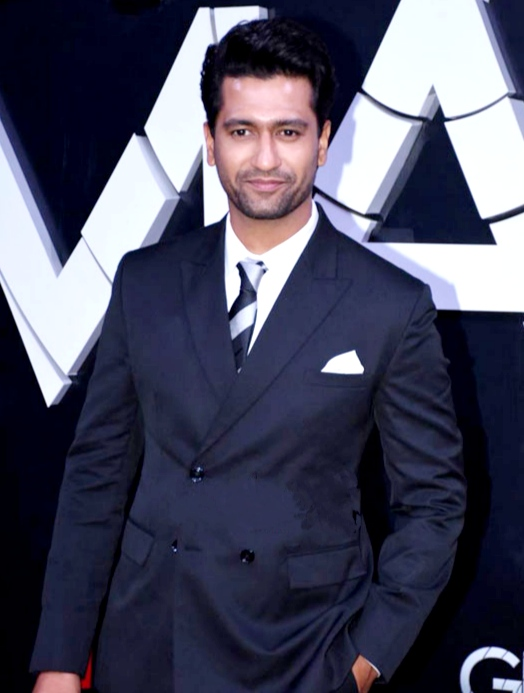
Kaushal in 2022

Following his debut, Kaushal was regarded by the media as one of the most promising newcomers in Hindi cinema. According to Firstpost, while Kaushal did not have the conventional looks by Hindi cinema standards, his "merit as a performer shone through right from his first film" and put him in a group of young actors who brought change in the concept of a typical hero. His roles and performances have since been studied by critics. Writing for Elle in 2019, Rajeev Masand pointed to "the unmistakable vulnerability in his eyes that comes from 'feeling' and 'living' his parts". While discussing his career in a 2021 article, Asjad Nazir of Eastern Eye wrote that Kaushal's "chameleon-like ability to morph himself into any character has already resulted in an impressive body of work and turned him into the go-to guy for demanding roles that add weight to a major movie." Also that year, Alaka Sahani of The Indian Express described him as "the most-dependable actor among the current crop", while Filmfare magazine hailed him as "one of the finest actors of this generation."

Kaushal is a method actor; he severely dehydrated himself and smoked heavily for Raman Raghav 2.0 and has gone through major physical transformations for several of his roles in films including Sanju (2018), Uri: The Surgical Strike (2019), Sardar Udham (2021), Sam Bahadur (2023), and Chhaava (2025), believing it helps him achieve the "right look" and thus benefits his performance. Kaushal's efforts to avoid typecasting by means of diverse parts in various film genres have been lauded by critics. In a 2018 interview with The Telegraph, he explained that "the idea is to never be repetitive... if I have done a role that's taken me to a certain space emotionally, I won't repeat that". Bollywood Hungama describes him as "a perfect mix of versatility, natural talent and dedication". Kaushal has featured frequently on Rediff.com's annual list of Bollywood's Best Actors.

Kaushal has been cited as one of the most attractive Indian celebrities by the media. He topped The Times of India's listing of the country's most desirable men of 2018, and was ranked at No. 4 in 2019 as well as 2020. In 2018, Forbes India included him in their 30 Under 30 list as well as their list of 'Tycoons of Tomorrow'. The following year, he appeared on the magazine's Celebrity 100 list, which ranked him 72nd with an estimated annual income of ₹104.2 million (US$1.1 million). Kaushal was also India's most-searched film actor in 2019, according to Google. In 2016 and 2021, he was listed as one of the best-dressed male celebrities by the Indian edition of GQ magazine. In 2026, Time magazine named him to its TIME100 Next India list, recognising him as one of India's emerging influential figures.

== Filmography ==
=== Films ===
Key
†	Denotes films that have not yet been released

Year	Title	Role	Notes	Ref
2012	Gangs of Wasseypur	—N/a	Assistant director	
2012	Luv Shuv Tey Chicken Khurana	Young Omi		
2013	Geek Out	Geek	Short film	
2015	Bombay Velvet	Inspector Basil		
2015	Masaan	Deepak Kumar Chaudhary	First lead role	
2016	Zubaan	Dilsher		
2016	Raman Raghav 2.0	ACP Raghavan "Raghav" Singh Umbi		
2018	Love per Square Foot	Sanjay Kumar Chaturvedi		
2018	Raazi	Iqbal Syed		
2018	Lust Stories	Paras Upadhyay	Karan Johar's segment	
2018	Sanju	Kamlesh "Kamli" Kanhaiyalal Kapasi		
2018	Manmarziyaan	Vicky Sandhu	Also playback singer for song "F For Fyaar"	
2019	Uri: The Surgical Strike	Major Vihaan Singh Shergill		
2020	Bhoot – Part One: The Haunted Ship	Prithvi Prakashan		
2021	Sardar Udham	Udham Singh		
2022	Govinda Naam Mera	Govinda Waghmare		
2023	Almost Pyaar with DJ Mohabbat	DJ Mohabbat	Special appearance	
2023	Zara Hatke Zara Bachke	Kapil Dubey		
2023	The Great Indian Family	Ved Vyas Tripathi (Bhajan Kumar)		
2023	Sam Bahadur	Sam Manekshaw		
2023	Dunki	Sukhi	Special appearance	
2024	Bad Newz	Akhil Chadha		
2025	Chhaava	Chhatrapati Sambhaji		
2025	Kesari Chapter 2	—N/a	Narrator	
2027	Love & War †	TBA	Filming	
2027	Mahavatar †	Chiranjeevi Parashurama		

=== Television ===
Year	Title	Role	Ref.
2018	25th Screen Awards	Co-host	
2019	Zee Cine Awards 2019	Co-host	
2019	64th Filmfare Awards	Co-host	
2020	65th Filmfare Awards	Co-host	
2021	Into the Wild with Bear Grylls	Celebrity guest	

=== Music video appearances ===
Year	Title	Singer(s)	Note	Ref.
2019	"Pachtaoge"	Arijit Singh		
2020	"Muskurayega India"	Vishal Mishra		
2023	"Bhide"	Arijit Singh, Divine	2023 Durand Cup theme song	

== Awards and nominations ==
Kaushal is the recipient of the National Film Award for Uri: The Surgical Strike (2019) and has three Filmfare Awards: Best Supporting Actor for Sanju (2019) and Dunki (2024) and Critics Award for Best Actor for Sardar Udham (2022). In addition to three Best Actor nominations for Uri: The Surgical Strike (2020), Sardar Udham (2022) and Sam Bahadur (2024).
