= Sardar Udham =

2021 Indian film by Shoojit Sircar

- Official release poster
- Directed by: Shoojit Sircar
- Written by: Shubhendu Bhattacharya; Ritesh Shah
- Produced by: Ronnie Lahiri; Sheel Kumar
- Starring: Vicky Kaushal
- Cinematography: Avik Mukhopadhyay
- Edited by: Chandrashekhar Prajapati
- Music by: Shantanu Moitra
- Production companies: Rising Sun Films; Kino Works
- Distributed by: Amazon Prime Video
- Release date: 16 October 2021
- Running time: 162 minutes
- Country: India
- Languages: Hindi; English; Punjabi

Sardar Udham is a 2021 Indian Hindi-language epic biographical historical drama film directed by Shoojit Sircar, and produced by Rising Sun Films in collaboration with Kino Works. The screenplay is written by Shubhendu Bhattacharya and Ritesh Shah, with Bhattacharya also writing the story based on team research, and Shah also writing the dialogues, while playing a supporting role. Based on the life of Udham Singh, who assassinated Michael O'Dwyer in London to avenge the 1919 Jallianwala Bagh massacre in Amritsar, the film starred Vicky Kaushal in the title role, along with Shaun Scott, Stephen Hogan, Amol Parashar, Banita Sandhu and Kirsty Averton in supporting roles.

The film was officially announced in March 2019, with principal photography began on April. In a marathon schedule of 7 months, the makers completed the shooting of the film in December 2019. Set in India and England, principal photography took place in Russia and India, with few sequences in United Kingdom and Ireland. Sardar Udham features musical score composed by Shantanu Moitra, cinematography handled by Avik Mukhopadhyay and editing done by Chandrashekhar Prajapati.

Initially being delayed multiple times due to the COVID-19 pandemic lockdown, the makers headed for a direct-to-digital premiere through the streaming service Amazon Prime Video. The film released on 16 October 2021, during the Dusshera weekend and eventually received widespread critical acclaim, with praise directed on Kaushal's performance, direction, screenplay and technical aspects. The film was also noted for its realistic portrayal of the Jallianwala Bagh massacre, being depicted in an extended and graphic sequence. Sardar Udham was listed by several publications as one of the best Hindi films of 2021, and subsequently won five National Film Awards including Best Feature Film In Hindi, as well as nine Filmfare Awards.

== Plot ==
The narrative utilizes a non-linear structure, alternating between the 1940s in London, where revolutionary Udham Singh plans a high-profile assassination, and his formative years in British India as a member of the Hindustan Socialist Republican Association (HSRA). After being released from a Punjab prison, Udham is kept under strict surveillance by colonial authorities. Evading his handlers, he travels through the frozen terrain of the USSR before securing passage on a cargo ship bound for London. Operating under aliases, Udham blends into the city, working as a salesman and a welder while tracking his target: Michael O'Dwyer, the former Lieutenant Governor of Punjab. Udham infiltrates a public meeting at Caxton Hall, where O'Dwyer is delivering a speech defending his controversial administration. As the event concludes, Udham approaches O'Dwyer and fatally shoots him, willingly surrendering to the police immediately after.

In custody, Udham is assigned a legal defense counsel, John Hutchinson, while being rigorously interrogated by Inspector Swain of Scotland Yard. Despite Hutchinson's dedicated legal strategy, the court sentences Udham to death. Upon hearing the verdict, Udham delivers an impassioned speech condemning British imperialism and reaffirming his unwavering devotion to Indian independence. Confined to Brixton Prison, Udham goes on a grueling 42-day hunger strike to protest the dismal conditions of his detention, which is eventually broken when prison authorities subject him to painful force-feeding. Over time, a mutual respect develops between Udham and Inspector Swain, to whom Udham gradually unveils the deep-seated trauma that motivated the assassination.

The narrative shifts back to April 1919 in Amritsar, where a young Udham works at a textile mill and shares a quiet romance with Reshma, a mute factory worker. On April 13, 1919, acting under O'Dwyer's administrative endorsement, Brigadier-General Reginald Dyer marches mostly Gurkha troops into Jallianwala Bagh and orders them to open fire on a peaceful, unarmed crowd of over twenty thousand men, women and children. Udham, who was asleep during the onset of the shooting, is jolted awake by a mortally wounded friend. He rushes to the walled garden, only to find a scene of horrific carnage. Alongside a handful of volunteers, Udham spends a agonizing night navigating piles of corpses, searching for survivors, and transporting the wounded to an overwhelmed, makeshift medical clinic. The profound psychological trauma of witnessing the Jallianwala Bagh massacre solidifies his lifelong vow to hold the architects of the tragedy accountable.

Back in 1940, as his execution date nears, Udham remains stoic and at peace with his fate. He is hanged at Pentonville Prison on July 31, 1940, clutching a cherished photograph of his revolutionary mentor, Bhagat Singh, who had been executed years prior. Decades later, in 1974, through the diplomatic efforts of Punjab Chief Minister Giani Zail Singh, Udham’s remains are exhumed and repatriated to an independent India. He is posthumously honored with the title Shaheed-i-Azam. His ashes are received with state honors and immersed in the Sutlej River, at the exact location where the remains of Bhagat Singh were placed. The film closes with archival testimonies from the Hunter Commission, where both Dyer and O'Dwyer rigidly defend their actions during the massacre.

== Cast ==
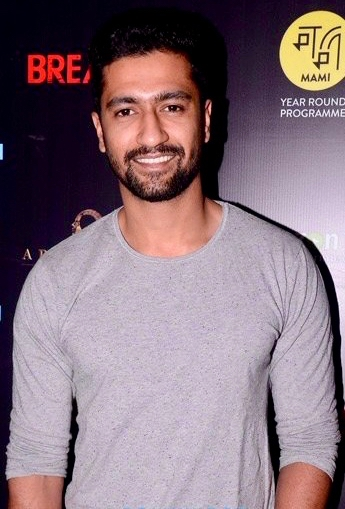
Vicky Kaushal (left)

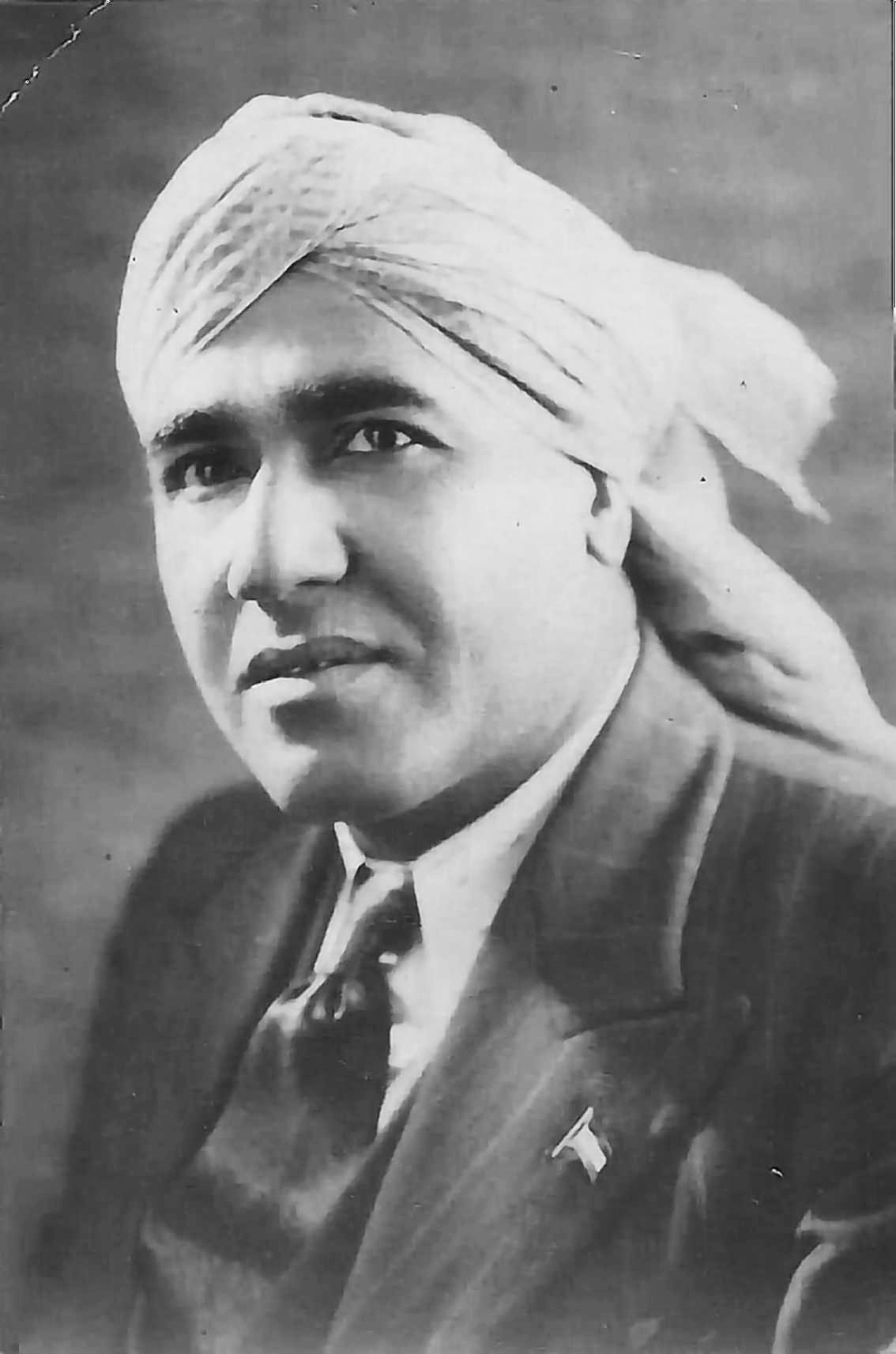
as Sardar Udham Singh

- Vicky Kaushal as Sher "Udham" Singh aka Ram Mohammad Singh Azad
- Shaun Scott as Michael O'Dwyer
- Stephen Hogan as Detective Inspector Swain
- Amol Parashar as Bhagat Singh
- Banita Sandhu as Reshma
- Kirsty Averton as Eileen Palmer
- Andrew Havill as General Reginald Dyer
- Ritesh Shah as Koppikar
- Manas Tiwari as Nihal Singh
- Tim Berrington as John Hutchinson
- Tim Hudson as Winston Churchill
- Nicholas Gecks as Justice Atkinson
- Sam Retford as Detective Deighton
- Simon Weir as King George VI
- Jogi Mallang as Surat Alley
- Kuljeet Singh as S. S. Johal
- Abhishek Malik as Bhagat Singh's associate
- Tushar Singhal as Udham's informer
- Sarfaraz Alam Safu as Interpreter At Scotland Yard

== Production ==
=== Development ===
A film based on the life of the Indian revolutionary Udham Singh was announced in March 2019, with Shoojit Sircar directing the film and has Vicky Kaushal playing the lead character. Sircar decided to cast Kaushal in the lead, because he wanted an "actor who is ready to give his heart and soul to the film" and the latter, hailing from Punjab, similar to Udham Singh, also a native of Punjab. Kaushal stated it as his dream project as he admired of Sircar's filmography, further saying "The way he is looking at the character (Udham Singh) and the world is extraordinary as well as beautiful. Plus, it's also a big honour for me that finally, I am going to be directed by him. Honestly, that's something that will take time to sink in". The film marked the second Indian project to be based on the life of the Indian revolutionary after the Raj Babbar-starrer Shaheed Udham Singh (2000).

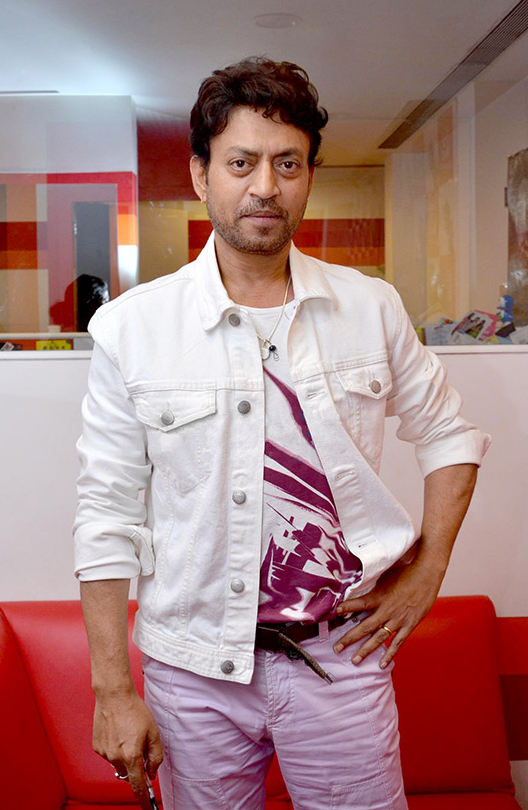
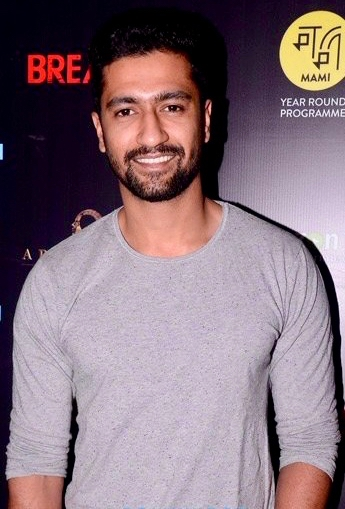
Shoojit Sircar initially wanted Irrfan Khan to play the lead, but due to health issues, he stepped out working on the film and had insisted to cast Vicky Kaushal in the lead.

The film's storyline traces from Singh's age of 20 to 40, showcasing the events of the Jallianwala Bagh massacre, to the assassination of Michael O'Dwyer, the Governor of Punjab who was responsible for the incident. The idea was initially pitched to be presented in the mid-1990s, after Sircar read about the events and life of Udham Singh, when he was a student at the Shaheed Bhagat Singh College in Delhi, but had waited for two decades due to his extensive research about Udham Singh, with Sircar wanting to showcase Udham's life to the current generation of younger audiences. Initially, the role was offered to Irrfan Khan, and his son Babil Khan was reported to play the younger version of Udham Singh. However, due to the former's health issues, he stepped out doing the role and insisted Kaushal to play the lead. Kaushal had undergone physical transformation to represent the younger version of Singh, losing 15 kilograms within two months. In November 2019, Banita Sandhu who worked with Sircar in October (2018), confirmed her presence, saying that she would play an important role in the film. Television and theatre actor Amol Parashar was assigned to play the role of Indian freedom fighter Bhagat Singh. Parashar told in an interview with The Indian Express, saying "I didn't have to copy any other actor's interpretation because nobody knows how tall he was, how he walked. It's only through the written accounts, which mostly are about his ideas and thought process. Now we needed to create a person who's believable. It was more about his energy." The film also has British actors Shaun Scott, Kirsty Averton and Stephen Hogan playing prominent roles. Originally titled Sardar Udham Singh, the title was later changed to Sardar Udham.

=== Filming ===
On the centennial year of the Jallianwala Bagh massacre, on 13 April 2019, principal photography began in London (with a 25–day schedule being filmed); the team then moved to Russia in late-April, filming several sequences in Saint Petersburg. Since the film is set in the pre-independence era, Sircar wanted to recreate the settings, characters and other things related to that period. Being his first period film, he noted the difficulty he had doing in research, saying "there are few records available and those there are were speculative". He gained ideas on recreating that period by watching American and European cinema, documentaries, and pictures from online archives. Four days before filming started, Kaushal faced injuries while shooting for another film and had 13 stitches on his cheek. But Sircar advised him to come with the shoot saying that Sardar Udham will also have stitches, and shot for his portions with a real scar in his face.

The filmmakers shot a month-long schedule in Russia and the team headed to Ireland and Germany during mid-June 2019. With a three-month shooting in parts of Europe and other countries, the team returned to India to commence a schedule in Amritsar, Punjab in October 2019. The schedule went on for 25 days, where sequences featuring the massacre and its aftermath being shot. Vicky Kaushal stated in an interview on the recreation of the incident that "it was physically exhausting, heart-wrenching and emotionally numbing as an individual, but as an actor, we have to be prepared at all sorts. To be thrown into that reality, almost a reality, to imagine yourself in that space. I had to react to dead bodies and all that bloodshed and bloodbath." Since the crew were not allowed to shoot the incidents at Jallianwala Bagh, the makers recreated few portions in empty sets in Punjab. Some scenes were also shot at Hoshiarpur. The team later returned to Europe to shoot a few sequences in November. Filming wrapped up on 27 December 2019, after consecutively filming for 6–7 months. The portions set in London were recreated in Russia, excepts for a few sequences which were shot in United Kingdom and Ireland.

=== Post-production ===
The film's post-production was scheduled to begin during mid-March 2020, but was delayed due to the COVID-19 lockdown in India. On 8 June 2020, the makers decided to begin post-production activities for the film, with Sircar activating a four-phase plan, starting with the editing process, which would go on for 15–20 days. Chandrashkehar Prajapati was the editor of the film, and during the editing process, only the director, editor, and his assistants were allowed inside the editing room, working while strictly adhering to social distancing protocols, and had to complete all editing works before the night curfew at 7:00 p.m. He also felt grateful that the film industry has developed an app that allowed them to share edited content, frame by frame, with explanatory comments, back and forth through the internet. Sircar wanted to resume visual effects in the second phase of post-production, but this was pushed back, as this required a larger crew of about 150–200 people.

Composer Shantanu Moitra worked on the film's score during June 2020. During mid-September 2020, the filmmakers resumed work on visual effects. Work on the sound design resumed in October, as the last phase in the post-production process. A part of the sound design was done in Europe, and another part took place in-house in Kolkata. Other activities such as digital intermediate, color grading and pre-visualization eventually began during early-2021. As per the suggestion of cinematographer Avik Mukhopadhyay and other crew members — executive producer Kumar Thakur, art directors Mansi Mehta and Dmitriy Malich — the filmmakers focused on the use of colour palettes with a gray-colored theme during the foreign sequences, and a sepia-colored theme for the sequences in Amritsar. Vicky Kaushal completed dubbing for his portions in September 2021.

== Soundtrack ==
Sardar Udham is a song-less film; its soundtrack featured six instrumental compositions used in the film score curated and composed by Shantanu Moitra, which was recorded during the COVID-19 lockdown period in June 2020, and were produced by George Joseph. The soundtrack was released by Zee Music Company on 2 October 2021.

== Release ==
In June 2019, Shoojit Sircar announced that the film would be released theatrically on the occasion of Gandhi Jayanti (2 October 2020), while also rumoured to be clashing with Satyameva Jayate 2 and Jayeshbhai Jordaar. However, the film was later rescheduled for release on 30 December 2020, which was also postponed, since post-production was affected by the COVID-19 pandemic. Despite the delays, Sircar decided to release the film in theatres, unlike other major Hindi films, which debuted on digital streaming platforms ever since the closure of theatres across the country due to the pandemic.

In September 2021, the producers headed for a direct-to-digital release, considering that theatres were reopened but only in limited states, and also the government did not allow permission to resume operations of theatres in Maharashtra until 22 October 2021. The producers later sold the distribution rights of the film to Amazon Prime Video, which scheduled for a release date of 16 October 2021, coinciding with Dusshera weekend. On 27 September 2021, the filmmakers released the teaser of the film, which introduced its theme and premise in a unique way. Three days later, on 30 September, the official trailer of the film was launched at an event in Mumbai, with the presence of Vicky Kaushal and Shoojit Sircar, along with the film's crew. The trailer received positive response from fans.

Kaushal shared his working stills of the film prior to the release, and also shared facts about Udham Singh, in his Instagram account. On 15 October 2021, a day prior to the release, a special screening of Sardar Udham was conducted to the press, critics and celebrities at a theatre in Mumbai. On the night of the same day, Amazon Prime Video released the film earlier ahead of the scheduled release of 16 October, in more than 240 countries and also in Hindi, Punjabi and English languages.

== Reception ==
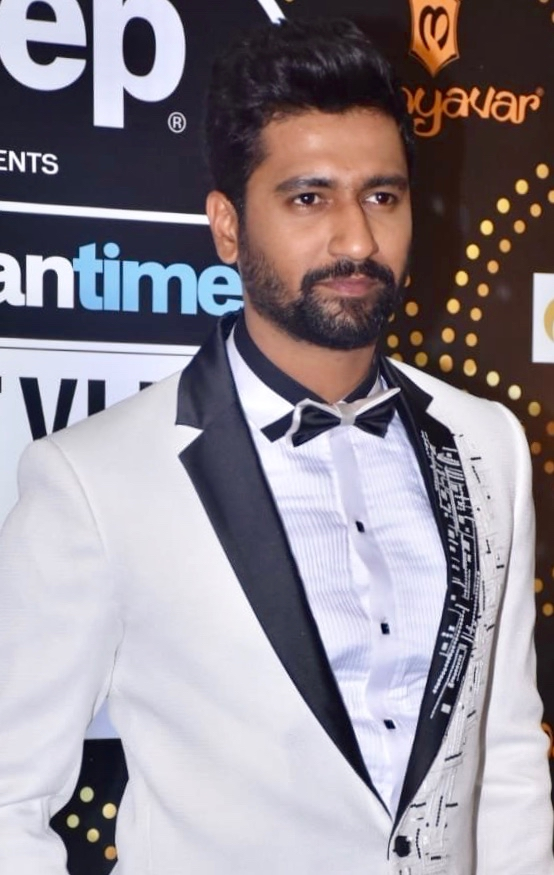
Vicky Kaushal received high critical acclaim for his portrayal of Udham Singh

The film received widespread critical acclaim, praising the performances of Kaushal and the supporting cast, realistic portrayal of the Jallianwala Bagh massacre, the setting of pre-independent India, technical aspects, script and direction. On the review aggregator website Rotten Tomatoes, 95% of 19 critics' reviews are positive, with an average rating of 7.4/10.

Shubhra Gupta of The Indian Express gave a positive review stating it as "a long, unhurried re-creation of a turbulent slice of India's colonial past, going back and forth from Punjab to London, with a few detours here and there". Anna M. M. Vetticad of Firstpost also gave a positive review stating "Shoojit Sircar has chosen to recount a remarkable (and painful) true story with a reliance on facts and facts alone", and further stated "The atrocities committed by the British colonisers in India are epitomised by the cruelty of Jallianwala Bagh. It is nothing short of a feat that Sircar has managed to chronicle that tragedy and its aftermath without turning his film into a call for vendetta. Both in terms of artistic merit and the political statements it makes, Sardar Udham is a landmark for Indian cinema."

Namrata Joshi of National Herald India wrote "Shoojit Sircar's biopic of the patriot is a stunning slice of history mirroring our fractious present and cautioning us about the pitfalls of the future". Saibal Chatterjee of NDTV stated "The brilliantly lensed biopic also draws power from lead actor Vicky Kaushal's intense and intuitive performance. Sircar combines a portrait of shocking brutality with a depiction of one man's determination not to back off from his risky stratagem. There is a phenomenal degree of craft in Sardar Udham but none of it is employed for mere effect. There is great deal of soul, too, in this magnificently crafted film." Renuka Vyahare of The Times of India stated "This film is a ticking time bomb waiting to explode but beware; the wait tries your patience. The intention is to give a lull before the storm treatment to storytelling. The non-linear, non-verbose narrative struggles to hold your attention even an hour into the movie. The re-enactment of the Jallianwala Bagh massacre is unsettling to watch and that is the very reason why this story needed to be told." Writing for The Week magazine, Aishwarya Venugopal stated "For the biopic of a revolutionary, the film does not throw punch dialogoues or the over-used trope of jingoism. Instead, Sircar takes the viewer smoothly, yet painfully, through his turbulent life". Anuj Kumar of The Hindu stated "Shoojit Sircar explores contentious definitions and concerns, as India continues to grapple with the idea of dissent, and Section 144 remains a repressive tool in the hands of the government of the day".

Soumya Srivatsava of Hindustan Times wrote "Sardar Udham, if there was ever any doubt, also proves once again that Shoojit Sircar is in top form and among the most dependable filmmakers in Hindi cinema right now. From slices of lives to biographies on historical heroes, he has been able to give his distinct stamp to any idea he has picked up. Hope the streak continues another 20 years." Nandini Ramanath of Scroll.in stated "Sardar Udham follows a handful of biopics about a historical figure whose colourful life readily lends itself to fictionalisation. The creators, bravely but also puzzlingly resist the temptation to include what might have been a shoo-in. The non-linear screenplay by Shubendu Bhattacharya (who also has a story credit) and Ritesh Shah is based on facts but takes creative licence with them." On the other hand, Syed Firdaus Ashraf of Rediff gave a mixed review saying "You neither get goosebumps nor the adrenaline rush of desh bhakti (patriotism), which a film like Sardar Udham should give every Indian. But a story of an unsung hero is needed to be told and hats off to Shoojit Sircar for doing that."

Several publications listed Sardar Udham as one of the best Bollywood films of 2021, which includes: The Indian Express (Shubhra Gupta and Minnasa Shekhar), Film Companion (Anupama Chopra), Hindustan Times (Devarsi Ghosh), The Hindu (Anuj Kumar), India Today (Anandita Mukherjee) and Firstpost (Subhash K. Jha). Forbes named it 2021's Best Hindi film with a social message.

== Awards and nominations ==
Award	Date of the ceremony	Category	Recipients	Result	Ref.
IIFA Awards	3–4 June 2022	Best Film	Rising Sun Films, Kino Works, Amazon Prime Video	Nominated	
IIFA Awards	3–4 June 2022	Best Director	Shoojit Sircar	Nominated	
IIFA Awards	3–4 June 2022	Best Actor	Vicky Kaushal	Won	
IIFA Awards	3–4 June 2022	Best Cinematography	Avik Mukhopadhyay	Won	
IIFA Awards	3–4 June 2022	Best Editing	Chandrashekhar Prajapati	Won	
IIFA Awards	3–4 June 2022	Best Special Effects	NY VFXWALA	Won	
Filmfare Awards	30 August 2022	Best Film	Rising Sun Films, Kino Works, Amazon Prime Video	Nominated	
Filmfare Awards	30 August 2022	Best Director	Shoojit Sircar	Nominated	
Filmfare Awards	30 August 2022	Best Film (Critics)	Shoojit Sircar	Won	
Filmfare Awards	30 August 2022	Best Actor	Vicky Kaushal	Nominated	
Filmfare Awards	30 August 2022	Best Actor (Critics)	Vicky Kaushal	Won	
Filmfare Awards	30 August 2022	Best Screenplay	Shubendu Bhattacharya, Ritesh Shah	Won	
Filmfare Awards	30 August 2022	Best Dialogue	Ritesh Shah	Nominated	
Filmfare Awards	30 August 2022	Best Production Design	Mansi Dhruv Mehta, Dmitrii Malich	Won	
Filmfare Awards	30 August 2022	Best Cinematography	Avik Mukhopadhyay	Won	
Filmfare Awards	30 August 2022	Best Costume Design	Veera Kapoor Ee	Won	
Filmfare Awards	30 August 2022	Best Editing	Chandrashekhar Prajapati	Nominated	
Filmfare Awards	30 August 2022	Best Sound Design	Dipankar Chaki, Nihar Ranjan Samal	Won	
Filmfare Awards	30 August 2022	Best Background Score	Shantanu Moitra	Won	
Filmfare Awards	30 August 2022	Best Special Effects	NY VFXWALA	Won	
National Film Awards	24 August 2023	Best Feature Film in Hindi	Sardar Udham	Won	
National Film Awards	24 August 2023	Best Cinematography	Avik Mukhopadhyay	Won	
National Film Awards	24 August 2023	Best Audiography	Sinoy Joseph	Won	
National Film Awards	24 August 2023	Best Production Design	Dmitri Malich-Konkov, Mansi Dhruv Mehta	Won	
National Film Awards	24 August 2023	Best Costume Design	Veera Kapur Ee	Won	

== Controversies ==
=== Copyright issues ===
A biopic was made on the revolutionary Udham Singh, as Shaheed Udham Singh (2000) before Sardar Udham was conceptualised. The film's producer Iqbal Dhillon sent a public notice to Kaushal and Sircar claiming over the copyright of the film's biopic. The notice had stated "We, Surjit Movies and Iqbal Singh Dhillon are the producers and the sole, exclusive and absolute owners of copyrights and all other rights and to all the works of the Punjabi and Hindustani film Shaheed Udham Singh: Alias Ram Mohammed Singh Azad." In defence, few sources had stated that team did not borrow anything from that film and further added that by 2000, all his life's work is copyright free and the team will not have any trouble for the film, unless the family of Udham Singh have any issue with the content.

=== Academy Award submission ===
The film was shortlisted among 14 other Indian films to be submitted at the 94th Academy Awards under the nomination of Best International Film category. However, it was not selected. The jury members — Bengali music composer-director Indraadip Dasgupta and production designer Sumit Basu — criticised the length of the film and its delayed climax, which was the reason for not being selected to the nominations. The latter, however, stated that the film projects "hatred towards the British". The decision from the jury members received some backlash, calling their reasons "baseless". However, the director Shoojit Sircar and Vicky Kaushal respected the jury's decision as "a personal and subjective opinion". They however supported the Tamil film Koozhangal, which was selected as the official entry to the award ceremony, but that was also not nominated.

== See also ==
Other films based on Indian Independence Movement:

- Shaheed - 1965 Indian film directed by S. Ram Sharma
- 23rd March 1931: Shaheed - 2002 Indian film directed by Guddu Dhanoa
- The Legend of Bhagat Singh - 2002 Indian film directed by Rajkumar Santoshi
- Shaheed-E-Azam - 2002 Indian film directed by Sukumar Nair
