= List of Hindi films of 2020 =

This is a list of Bollywood films that were released in 2020.

== Box office collection ==
The highest-grossing Bollywood films released in 2020, by worldwide box office gross revenue, are as follows.

Highest worldwide gross of 2020
| Rank | Title | Production company | Distributor | Worldwide gross | Ref. |
|---|---|---|---|---|---|
| 1 | Tanhaji | Ajay Devgn FFilms; T-Series Films | AA Films | ₹368 crore (US$49.66 million) | |
| 2 | Baaghi 3 | Nadiadwala Grandson Entertainment; Fox Star Studios | Fox Star Studios | ₹137.05 crore (US$18.5 million) | |
| 3 | Street Dancer 3D | T-Series Films; Remo D'Souza Entertainment | AA Films | ₹97 crore (US$13.09 million) | |
| 4 | Shubh Mangal Zyada Saavdhan | T-Series Films; Colour Yellow Productions | AA Films | ₹87 crore (US$11.74 million) | |
| 5 | Malang | T-Series Films; Luv Films; Northern Lights Entertainment | Yash Raj Films | ₹81.50 crore (US$11 million) | |
| 6 | Chhapaak | Fox Star Studios; Ka Productions; Mriga Films | Fox Star Studios | ₹55.44 crore (US$7.48 million) | |
| 7 | Love Aaj Kal | Maddock Films; Window Seat Films; Jio Studios; Reliance Entertainment | Pen Marudhar Entertainment | ₹52.63 crore (US$7.1 million) | |
| 8 | Jawaani Jaaneman | Pooja Entertainment; Black Knight Films; Northern Lights Films | Pen Marudhar Entertainment | ₹44.77 crore (US$6.04 million) | |
| 9 | Thappad | T-Series Films; Benaras Media Works | AA Films | ₹44.54 crore (US$6.01 million) | |
| 10 | Panga | Fox Star Studios | | ₹41.71 crore (US$5.63 million) | |

== January–March ==
| Opening | | Title | Director | Cast | Studio (production house) | Ref. |
|---|---|---|---|---|---|---|
| J A N | 1 | Ghost Stories | Karan Johar; Dibakar Banerjee; Zoya Akhtar; Anurag Kashyap | Sobhita Dhulipala; Mrunal Thakur; Avinash Tiwary; Janhvi Kapoor; Surekha Sikri; Raghuvir Yadav; Gulshan Devaiah; Vijay Varma; Pavail Gulati; Jyoti Subhash; Eva Ameet Pardeshi; Kitu Gidwani; Sumit Tandon | RSVP Movies, Flying Unicorn Entertainment, Tiger Baby Films, Big Bad Wolf, JAR Pictures, The Monsoon Media & Entertainment, Dharma Productions, Netflix | |
| J A N | 1 | Beautiful | Agastya Manju | Naina Ganguly; K K Binojee; Parth Suri | Tiger/Company Productions | |
| J A N | 3 | Bhangra Paa Le | Sneha Taurani | Sunny Kaushal; Rukshar Dhillon; Shriya Pilgaonkar | RSVP Movies | |
| J A N | 3 | Sab Kushal Mangal | Karan Vishwanath Kashyap | Akshaye Khanna; Riva Kishan; Priyank Sharma | One Up Entertainment | |
| J A N | 3 | Shimla Mirchi | Ramesh Sippy | Hema Malini; Rajkummar Rao; Rakul Preet Singh | Viacom18 Motion Pictures, Ramesh Sippy Entertainment | |
| J A N | 6 | Half Widow | Danish Renzu | Neelofar Hamid; Shahnawaz Bhat; Mir Sarwar; Haseena Sofi | Renzu Films, Gaya Art Films | |
| J A N | 10 | Chhapaak | Meghna Gulzar | Deepika Padukone; Vikrant Massey | Fox Star Studios, Ka Productions, Mriga Films | |
| J A N | 10 | Tanhaji | Om Raut | Ajay Devgn; Saif Ali Khan; Kajol; Sharad Kelkar | T-Series Films, Ajay Devgn FFilms | |
| J A N | 17 | Bunker | Jugal Raja | Abhijeet Singh; Arindita Kalita | Wagging Tail Entertainment | |
| J A N | 17 | Jai Mummy Di | Navjot Gulati | Sunny Singh; Sonnalli Seygall; Poonam Dhillon; Supriya Pathak | T-Series Films, Luv Films | |
| J A N | 24 | Panga | Ashwiny Iyer Tiwari | Kangana Ranaut; Jassi Gill; Richa Chadha; Neena Gupta | Fox Star Studios | |
| J A N | 24 | Street Dancer 3D | Remo D'Souza | Varun Dhawan; Shraddha Kapoor; Prabhu Deva; Nora Fatehi; Aparshakti Khurana; Murali Sharma; Raghav Juyal; Dharmesh Yelande; Punit Pathak; Jigar Rupareliya; Sonam Bajwa | T-Series Films, Remo D'Souza Entertainment | |
| J A N | 31 | Gul Makai | H.E. Amjad khan | Reem Shaikh; Atul Kulkarni; Divya Dutta; Om Puri; Arif Zakaria; Mukesh Rishi; Abhimanyu Singh; Pankaj Tripathi | Pen Studios, Tekno Films | |
| J A N | 31 | Happy Hardy and Heer | Raka | Himesh Reshammiya; Sonia Mann | HR Musik Limited, EYKA Films | |
| J A N | 31 | Jawaani Jaaneman | Nitin Kakkar | Saif Ali Khan; Tabu; Alaya Furniturewala | Pooja Entertainment, Black Knight Films, Northern Lights Films | |
| J A N | 31 | Pagleaazam | Vikas P Kavvthekaar, Aps Raghuvanshi | Aditya Pratap Singh; Mandeep Kaur Mannnat; Sonia Sharma; Liliput; Faruque; Ravi Mann; Abhinaye Sharma; Sahil Patel; Amber Upadhyay | Aps Entertainment | |
| F E B | 4 | Operation Parindey | Sanjay Gadhvi | Amit Sadh; Rahul Dev; Aakash Dahiya; Rucha Inamdar | Final Coast, Fluence Studios, Roll Kamera Motion Pictures, ZEE5 | |
| F E B | 7 | Hacked | Vikram Bhatt | Hina Khan; Rohan Shah; Mohit Malhotra; Sid Makkar | Zee Studios, Loneranger Productions | |
| F E B | 7 | Kaanchli Life in a Slough | Dedipya Joshii | Sanjay Mishra; Shikha Malhotra | Pisceann Pictures | |
| F E B | 7 | Malang | Mohit Suri | Aditya Roy Kapur; Disha Patani; Anil Kapoor; Elli AvrRam; Kunal Khemu | T-Series Films, Luv Films, Northern Lights Films | |
| F E B | 7 | Yahan Sabhi Gyani Hain | Anant Tripathi | Neeraj Sood; Apoorva Arora; Atul Srivastav | Ulterior Vision Production Private Limited, The Future Films | |
| F E B | 7 | Shikara | Vidhu Vinod Chopra | Aadil Khan; Sadia Khateeb | Fox Star Studios, Vinod Chopra Films | |
| F E B | 14 | Khawab Sare Jhoothey | Deepak Baldev Thakur | Harsh Kumar; Tullika Singh | Glitters Film Academy, AG Entertainment | |
| F E B | 14 | Love Aaj Kal | Imtiaz Ali | Kartik Aaryan; Sara Ali Khan; Randeep Hooda | Pen Studios, Window Seat Films, Reliance Entertainment, Maddock Films, Jio Studios | |
| F E B | 14 | Shukranu | Bishnu Dev Halder | Divyenndu; Shweta Basu Prasad; Sheetal Thakur | Reliance Entertainment, ZEE5 | |
| F E B | 21 | Bhoot – Part One: The Haunted Ship | Bhanu Pratap Singh | Vicky Kaushal; Bhumi Pednekar | Zee Studios, Dharma Productions | |
| F E B | 21 | The Hundred Bucks | Dushyant Pratap Singh | Kavita Tripathi; Dinesh Bawra; Jaid Shaikh | A Reel and Motion Picture, Dushyant Corporation | |
| F E B | 21 | Shubh Mangal Zyada Saavdhan | Hitesh Kewalya | Ayushmann Khurrana; Jitendra Kumar; Gajraj Rao; Neena Gupta; Manurishi Chaddha; Sunita Rajwar; Maanvi Gagroo; Pankhuri Awasthy; Neeraj Singh | T-Series Films, Colour Yellow Productions | |
| F E B | 21 | Yeh Ballet | Sooni Taraporevala | Julian Sands; Achintya Bose; Manish Chauhan | Roy Kapur Films, Netflix | |
| F E B | 28 | Doordarshan | Gagan Puri | Mahie Gill; Manu Rishi Chaddha; Dolly Ahluwalia; Supriya Shukla; Rajesh Sharma; Mehak Manwani; Sumit Gulati | Arya Films | |
| F E B | 28 | Guns of Banaras | Sekhar Suri | Karan Nath; Nathalia Kaur; Abhimanyu Singh; Ganesh Venkatraman; Shilpa Shirodkar; Zarina Wahab; Mohan Agashe; Tej Sapru | AJ Media Corp, Dashaka Cinema Co. | |
| F E B | 28 | Haunted Hills | Sanjeev Kumar Rajput | Zuber K. Khan; Diana Khan | RSBS Films, UFO Moviez | |
| F E B | 28 | O Pushpa I Hate Tears | Dinkar Kapoor | Krushna Abhishek; Karthik Jayaram; Arjumman Mughal | Films@50, Wavelength Studios | |
| F E B | 28 | Thappad | Anubhav Sinha | Taapsee Pannu; Pavail Gulati; Maya Sarao; Naila Grewal | T-Series Films, Benaras Media Works | |
| M A R | 2 | Dheet Patangey | Ravi Adhikari | Shivin Narang; Chandan Roy Sanyal; Ali Murad; Hardik Sanghani; Tillotama Shome; Priya Banerjee | Happi Digital, Hotstar | |
| M A R | 6 | Baaghi 3 | Ahmed Khan | Tiger Shroff; Riteish Deshmukh; Shraddha Kapoor; Ankita Lokhande | Fox Star Studios, Nadiadwala Grandson Entertainment | |
| M A R | 6 | Guilty | Ruchi Narain | Kiara Advani; Akansha Ranjan Kapoor; Gurfateh Singh Pirzada; Taher Shabbir; Dalip Tahil; Kunal Vijaykar; Manu Rishi; Janya Joshi; Chayan Chopra | Dharmatic Entertainment, Netflix | |
| M A R | 6 | Kaamyaab | Hardik Mehta | Sanjay Mishra; Deepak Dobriyal | Red Chillies Entertainment, Drishyam Films | |
| M A R | 13 | Angrezi Medium | Homi Adajania | Irrfan Khan; Kareena Kapoor; Radhika Madan; Deepak Dobriyal; Pankaj Tripathi | Jio Studios, Maddock Films | |
| M A R | 27 | Maska | Neeraj Udhwani | Manisha Koirala; Nikita Dutta; Javed Jaffrey; Prit Kamani; Shirley Setia | Mutant Films, Netflix | |

== April–June ==
Films were not released theatrically from 17 March till 14 October due to the COVID-19 pandemic.

| Opening | | Title | Director | Cast | Studio (production house) | Ref. |
|---|---|---|---|---|---|---|
| A P R | 10 | Bamfaad | Ranjan Chandel | Aditya Rawal; Shalini Pandey; Vijay Varma | JAR Pictures, ZEE5 | |
| A P R | 21 | Ateet | Tanuj Bhramar | Priyamani; Sanjay Suri; Rajeev Khandelwal | Funtime Entertainment, Indian Film Studios, ZEE5 | |
| M A Y | 1 | Mrs. Serial Killer | Shirish Kunder | Jacqueline Fernandez; Manoj Bajpayee; Mohit Raina; Zayn Marie | Three's Company Productions, Netflix | |
| M A Y | 6 | Court Martial | Sourabh Srivastava | Rajeev Khandelwal; Saksham Dayma; Swapnil Kotiwar | Zee Theatre, Iris Productions | |
| M A Y | 20 | What Are the Odds | Megha Ramaswamy | Yashaswini Dayama; Karanvir Malhotra; Abhay Deol | FilmKaravan, Netflix | |
| M A Y | 22 | Ghoomketu | Pushpendra Nath Misra | Nawazuddin Siddiqui; Ragini Khanna; Richa Chadha; Anurag Kashyap; Deepika Amin; Raghuvir Yadav; Ila Arun; Swanand Kirkire | Sony Pictures Networks Productions, Phantom Films, ZEE5 | |
| J U N | 1 | Chippa | Safdar Rehman | Sunny Pawar; Joyraj Bhattacharya; Sumeet Thakur; Gautam Sarkar; Masood Akhtar; Kalpan Mitra | Traveling Light Pictures, Ultra Media & Entertainment, Victory Media, Wishberry Films | |
| J U N | 5 | Chintu Ka Birthday | Devanshu Kumar; Satyanshu Singh | Vinay Pathak; Tillotama Shome; Nate Scholz | Final Draft, ZEE5, | |
| J U N | 5 | Choked | Anurag Kashyap | Saiyami Kher; Roshan Mathew; Amruta Subhash; Rajshri Deshpande | JAR Pictures, Good Bad Films, Netflix | |
| J U N | 12 | Axone | Nicholas Kharkongor | Dolly Ahluwalia; Sayani Gupta; Tenzin Dalha; Vinay Pathak; Lin Laishram; Asenla Jamir; Lanuakum Ao | Saregama India, Yoodlee Films | |
| J U N | 12 | Gulabo Sitabo | Shoojit Sircar | Farrukh Jaffar; Amitabh Bachchan; Ayushmann Khurrana; Vijay Raaz; Brijendra Kala; Nalneesh Neel | Rising Sun Films, Kino Works, Amazon Prime Video | |
| J U N | 18 | Kadakh | Rajat Kapoor | Kalki Koechlin; Ranvir Shorey; Shruti Seth; Manoj Pahwa; Tara Sharma; Cyrus Sahukar; Mansi Multani | Mithya Talkies, Sony LIV | |
| J U N | 19 | Chaman Bahaar | Apurva Dhar Badgaiyann | Jitendra Kumar; Ritika Badiani | Yoodlee Films, Saregama India | |
| J U N | 24 | Bulbbul | Anvita Dutt | Tripti Dimri; Avinash Tiwary; Rahul Bose; Parambrata Chatterjee; Paoli Dam | Clean Slate Filmz, Netflix | |
| J U N | 26 | Bhonsle | Devashish Makhija | Manoj Bajpayee; Santosh Juvekar; Ipshita Chakraborty Singh; Abhishek Banerjee | Muvizz, Sony LIV | |
| J U N | 27 | Unlock | Debatma Mandal | Kushal Tandon; Hina Khan; Rishabh Sinha; Aditi Arya | Krasnaya Corporation, Wind Horse Films, ZEE5 | |

== July–September ==
| Opening | | Title | Director | Cast | Studio (production house) | Ref. |
|---|---|---|---|---|---|---|
| J U L | 16 | Virgin Bhanupriya | Ajay Lohan | Urvashi Rautela; Gautam Gulati | Dhariwal Films, ZEE5 | |
| J U L | 24 | Dil Bechara | Mukesh Chhabra | Sushant Singh Rajput; Sanjana Sanghi; Saif Ali Khan; Sahil Vaid; Saswata Chatterjee | Fox Star Studios, Disney+ Hotstar | |
| J U L | 30 | Yaara | Tigmanshu Dhulia | Vidyut Jammwal; Shruti Haasan; Amit Sadh; Vijay Varma; Kenny Basumatary | Tigmanshu Dhulia Films, Azure Entertainment, ZEE5 | |
| J U L | 31 | Shakuntala Devi | Anu Menon | Vidya Balan; Jisshu Sengupta; Sanya Malhotra; Amit Sadh | Sony Pictures Networks Productions, Abundantia Entertainment, Genius Films, Amazon Prime Video | |
| J U L | 31 | Lootcase | Rajesh Krishnan | Kunal Khemu; Rasika Dugal; Vijay Raaz; Ranvir Shorey; Gajraj Rao; Aryan Prajapati; Shashi Ranjan; Sumit Nijhawan | Fox Star Studios, Soda Films, Disney+ Hotstar | |
| J U L | 31 | Raat Akeli Hai | Honey Trehan | Nawazuddin Siddiqui; Radhika Apte; Shweta Tripathi; Ila Arun; Shivani Raghuvanshi; Aditya Srivastava; Tigmanshu Dhulia; Swanand Kirkire | RSVP Movies, MacGuffin Pictures, Netflix | |
| A U G | 6 | Pareeksha | Prakash Jha | Adil Hussain; Priyanka Bose; Sanjay Suri | Prakash Jha Productions, ZEE5 | |
| A U G | 12 | Gunjan Saxena: The Kargil Girl | Sharan Sharma | Janhvi Kapoor; Pankaj Tripathi; Angad Bedi; Vineet Kumar Singh; Manav Vij | Zee Studios, Dharma Productions, Netflix | |
| A U G | 14 | Khuda Haafiz | Faruk Kabir | Vidyut Jammwal; Shivaleeka Oberoi; Annu Kapoor; Shiv Panditt; Aahana Kumra | Panorama Studios, Disney+ Hotstar | |
| A U G | 21 | Captain Vidyut | Atish Tipathi | Namit Das; Suresh Menon; Trisha Kale; Raghuvir Yadav | Parijat Animation Films | |
| A U G | 21 | Class of '83 | Atul Sabharwal | Bobby Deol; Bhupendra Jadawat; Hitesh Bhojraj; Anup Soni; Joy Sengupta; Sameer Paranjape; Ninad Mahajani; Prithvik Pratap | Red Chillies Entertainment, Netflix | |
| A U G | 21 | Mee Raqsam | Baba Azmi | Naseeruddin Shah; Danish Husain; Aditi Subedi; Shradha Kaul; Rakesh Chaturvedi | AZMI Pictures, ZEE5 | |
| A U G | 28 | Sadak 2 | Mahesh Bhatt | Sanjay Dutt; Pooja Bhatt; Alia Bhatt; Aditya Roy Kapur | Gravitas Ventures, Fox Star Studios, Vishesh Films, Disney+ Hotstar | |
| A U G | 28 | Ram Singh Charlie | Nitin Kakkar | Kumud Mishra; Divya Dutta; Akarsh Khurana; Farrukh Seyer; Salima Raza; Rohit Rokhade | Little Too Much Productions, Sony Liv | |
| S E P | 5 | Atkan Chatkan | Shiv Hare | Sachin Chaudhary; Yash Rane; Tamanna Dipak | Lokaa Entertainment, ZEE5 | |
| S E P | 9 | Cargo | Arati Kadav | Vikrant Massey; Shweta Tripathi | Fundamental Pictures, Electric Films, Netflix | |
| S E P | 18 | Dolly Kitty Aur Woh Chamakte Sitare | Alankrita Shrivastava | Konkona Sen Sharma; Bhumi Pednekar; Amol Parashar; Aamir Bashir; Kubbra Sait; Karan Kundra; Vikrant Massey; Mushtaq Khan | Balaji Motion Pictures, ALT Entertainment, Netflix | |
| S E P | 18 | London Confidential | Kanwal Sethi | Mouni Roy; Purab Kohli; Kulraj Randhawa; Sagar Arya; Parvesh Rana; Jas Binag; Diljohn Singh; Kiren Jog | JAR Pictures, ZEE5 | |
| S E P | 21 | Halahal | Randeep Jha | Sachin Khedekar; Barun Sobti | Eros International, Eros Now | |

== October–December ==
| Opening | | Title | Director | Cast | Studio (production house) | Ref. |
|---|---|---|---|---|---|---|
| O C T | 2 | Khaali Peeli | Maqbool Khan | Ishaan Khatter; Ananya Panday; Jaideep Ahlawat | Zee Studios, Zee Plex, Offside Entertainment, ZEE5 | |
| O C T | 2 | Serious Men | Sudhir Mishra | Nawazuddin Siddiqui; Aakshath Das; Shweta Basu Prasad; Nassar; Indira Tiwari | Bombay Fables, Cineraas Entertainment Netflix | |
| O C T | 2 | Bahut Hua Samman | Ashish R Shukla | Raghav Juyal; Abhishek Chauhan; Sanjay Mishra; Ram Kapoor; Nidhi Singh; Namit Das; Flora Saini | Yoodlee Films, Disney+ Hotstar | |
| O C T | 9 | Ginny Weds Sunny | Puneet Khanna | Yami Gautam; Vikrant Massey | Soundrya Production, Netflix | |
| O C T | 16 | The Pickup Artist | Rohit Arora | Dev Chauhan; Pankaj Uniyal | Roar Picture Company | |
| O C T | 21 | Comedy Couple | Nachiket Samant | Saqib Saleem; Shweta Basu Prasad | Yoodlee Films, ZEE5 | |
| O C T | 23 | Kasaai | Gajendra Shrotriya | Mita Vasisht; Mayur More; Amit Bimrot | ShemarooMe | |
| O C T | 29 | Taish | Bejoy Nambiar | Pulkit Samrat; Kriti Kharbanda; Jim Sarbh; Harshvardhan Rane; Zoa Morani; Sanjeeda Sheikh; Abhimanyu Singh; Ankur Rathee | Ease My Trip, Getaway Pictures, Crayon Films, ZEE5 | |
| O C T | 30 | Kaali Khuhi | Terrie Samundra | Shabana Azmi; Satyadeep Mishra; Riva Arora; Sanjeeda Sheikh | Manomay Motion Pictures, Netflix | |
| N O V | 6 | Pepper Chicken | Ratan Sil Ram | Dipannita Sharma; Boloram Das; Baharul Islam; Ravi Sarma; Monuj Borkotoky | RKZ Films, North-East Film Studio, ShemarooMe | |
| N O V | 9 | Laxmii | Raghava Lawrence | Akshay Kumar; Kiara Advani | Fox Star Studios, Cape Of Good Films, Shabinaa Entertainment, Tushar Entertainment House, Disney+ Hotstar | |
| N O V | 12 | Ludo | Anurag Basu | Abhishek Bachchan; Rajkummar Rao; Aditya Roy Kapur; Fatima Sana Shaikh; Sanya Malhotra; Pankaj Tripathi; Rohit Suresh Saraf; Pearle Maaney; Asha Negi; Inayat Verma; Shalini Vats | T-Series Films, Anurag Basu Productions, Ishana Movies, Netflix | |
| N O V | 13 | Chhalaang | Hansal Mehta | Rajkummar Rao; Nushrratt Bharuccha | T-Series Films, Ajay Devgn FFilms, Luv Films, Amazon Prime Video | |
| N O V | 13 | Namumkin Tere Bin Jeena | Hidayat Khan | Anmol Chopra; Christeena; Biju Rehana Khan | Trisha Raj Films Pvt.Ltd, Zaid Corporation Company, Shamshad Pathan Films | |
| N O V | 13 | Sir | Rohena Gera | Tillotama Shome; Vivek Gomber | Platoon Films | |
| N O V | 15 | Suraj Pe Mangal Bhari | Abhishek Sharma | Manoj Bajpayee; Diljit Dosanjh; Fatima Sana Shaikh | Zee Studios | |
| N O V | 20 | Anwar Ka Ajab Kissa | Buddhadeb Dasgupta | Nawazuddin Siddiqui; Ananya Chatterjee; Pankaj Tripathi; Niharika Singh | Eros International, Eros Now | |
| N O V | 29 | It's My Life | Anees Bazmee | Nana Patekar; Harman Baweja; Genelia D'Souza | Zee Cinema | |
| D E C | 4 | Darbaan | Bipin Nadkarni | Sharib Hashmi; Sharad Kelkar; Flora Saini; Rasika Dugal | Opticus Inc, ZEE5 | |
| D E C | 11 | Durgamati | G. Ashok | Bhumi Pednekar; Arshad Warsi; Jisshu Sengupta; Mahie Gill; Karan Kapadia | T-Series Films, Abundantia Entertainment, Cape of Good Films, Amazon Prime Video | |
| D E C | 11 | Indoo Ki Jawani | Abir Sengupta | Kiara Advani; Aditya Seal | T-Series Films, Electric Apples Entertainment, Emmay Entertainment | |
| D E C | 11 | Nirvana Inn | Vijay Jayapal | Adil Hussain; Rajshri Deshpande; Sandhya Mridul | Stray Factory, Uncombed Buddha, Stop Whinging, Harman Ventures, Cinemapreneur | |
| D E C | 11 | Torbaaz | Girish Malik | Sanjay Dutt; Nargis Fakhri; Rahul Dev; Gavie Chahal; Rahul Mittra; Pransh Chopra | Raju Chadha Films, Rahul Mittra Films, Clapstem Entertainment, Netflix | |
| D E C | 18 | Eeb Allay Ooo! | Prateek Vats | Shardul Bharadwaj; Mahender Nath; Nutan Sinha; Shashi Bhushan; Naina Sareen | NaMa Productions | |
| D E C | 18 | Sayonee | Nitin Kumar Gupta; Abhay Singhal | Tanmay Ssingh; Musskan Sethi; Rahul Roy; Yograj Singh; Upasana Singh | Lucky Nadiadwala Morani Productions, D&T Productions Pvt. Ltd. | |
| D E C | 18 | Omprakash Zindabad | Ranjeet Gupta | Kulbhushan Kharbanda; Jagdeep; Shweta Bhardwaj; Seema Azmi; Abhay Joshi; Ishtiyak Khan; Zakir Hussain; Om Puri | Panorama Studios | |
| D E C | 18 | Unpaused | Raj & D.K; Nitya Mehra; Nikkhil Advani; Tannishtha Chatterjee; Avinash Arun | Gulshan Devaiah; Sumeet Vyas; Saiyami Kher; Richa Chadda; Abhishek Banerjee; Ratna Pathak Shah; Ishwak Singh | d2r Films, Emmay Entertainment, Pritish Nandy Communications, Reverie Entertainment, Pink Window Productions, Amazon Prime Video | |
| D E C | 24 | AK vs AK | Vikramaditya Motwane | Anil Kapoor; Anurag Kashyap | Andolan Films, Netflix | |
| D E C | 25 | Coolie No. 1 | David Dhawan | Varun Dhawan; Sara Ali Khan; Rajat Rawail | Pooja Entertainment, Amazon Prime Video | |
| D E C | 25 | Shakeela | Indrajit Lankesh | Richa Chadda; Pankaj Tripathi; Rajeev Pillai | Sammy's Magic Cinema | |

== See also ==
- List of Bollywood films of 2021
- List of Bollywood films of 2019

== Notes ==
Films were not released theatrically from 17 March till 14 October due to the COVID-19 pandemic.
