= Raid 2 (film) =

2025 Indian film by Raj Kumar Gupta

- Theatrical release poster
- Directed by: Raj Kumar Gupta
- Written by: Ritesh Shah; Raj Kumar Gupta; Jaideep Yadav; Karan Vyas
- Produced by: Bhushan Kumar; Krishan Kumar; Kumar Mangat Pathak; Abhishek Pathak
- Starring: Ajay Devgn; Riteish Deshmukh; Vaani Kapoor
- Cinematography: Sudhir K. Chaudhary
- Edited by: Sandeep Francis
- Music by: Score: Amit Trivedi; Songs: Yo Yo Honey Singh; Rochak Kohli; Sachet–Parampara; White Noise Collectives
- Production companies: T-Series Films; Panorama Studios
- Distributed by: Panorama Studios; PVR Inox Pictures
- Release date: 1 May 2025
- Running time: 138 minutes
- Country: India
- Language: Hindi
- Budget: ₹120 crore
- Box office: ₹243.06 crore

Raid 2 is a 2025 Indian Hindi-language crime thriller film directed by Raj Kumar Gupta. The film is a sequel to Raid (2018) and stars Ajay Devgn, Riteish Deshmukh and Vaani Kapoor along with a special appearance by Tamannaah Bhatia. Set 7 years after the events of the first film, it follows the return of IRS officer Amay Patnaik (Devgn), who tracks another white-collar crime.

Like the previous film, the sequel is also based on the income-tax raid conducted by the officers of Income Tax Department who work with intelligence agencies to track white-collar crimes. The film was announced in April 2020. Filming was held in Mumbai, Rajasthan, Uttar Pradesh, and Delhi in the first half of 2024.

Raid 2 was released theatrically on 1 May 2025 and received mixed reviews from critics, but performed well and became the seventh-highest-grossing Hindi film of 2025.

== Plot ==
Set 7 years after the previous films, in 1988 Indian Revenue Service Officer Amay Patnaik, an honest and daring officer who has seized over ₹4200 crores in his raids, gets transferred for the 74th time to the fictional town of Bhoj in Madhya Pradesh, where he tracks another white-collar criminal, Manohar Dhankar alias Dada Manohar Bhai, a corrupt politician, on his 75th raid. Later as Amay Patnaik tries to find the black money hidden by Dada Manohar Bhai during his raid, he gets suspended in the process. Later, after his suspension gets revoked, he continues to pursue Dada Manohar Bhai with the help of his Income Tax team, and lawyer Devinder Gehlot, who files a PIL against Dada Manohar Bhai to bring to light financial irregularities in his organization. This forces Dada Manohar Bhai to offer lawyer Gehlot INR 5 crore as bribe. It turns out that lawyer Gehlot had filed the PIL after being prodded by Amay Patnaik. When Dada Manohar Bhai offers the bribe in cash, Gehlot presents that money as evidence in court, which prompts the court to issue an order to probe financial irregularities in Dada Manohar Bhai's organization.

Amay Patnaik then finds out that Dada Manohar Bhai had built a facade around him of a do gooder, when he was actually a conniving criminal who used to take advantage of vulnerable girls in return for giving them government jobs and going as far as using their names to buy benami property in their names as a means to launder black money. Amay also finds that Dada Manohar Bhai had opened several shell companies in the name of poor villagers who did not know anything about it to siphon off money to offshore accounts. After this Amay readies his team in Bhoj to raid Dada Manohar Bhai's properties, which stuns them. It's then that Amay reveals his suspension was a ploy to keep Dada Manohar Bhai confused. The final straw is the raid on a newly built 5-star hotel where huge amount of illegally acquired cash, property documents, faucets made of solid gold painted to look like steel are recovered. All this seizure is topped by the recovery of a huge statue of a forehand made of solid gold from a pool at the entrance of Dada Manohar Bhai's organization. As his carefully built facade starts to crumble, a pestered Dada Manohar Bhai tries to attack Amay Patnaik but is stopped by his mother, who was made aware of the series of events and the whole truth by Malini, Amay's wife persuading her to help Amay. Dada Manohar Bhai realizes his mistake and surrenders. In the end, Rameshwar Singh alias "Tauji", tries and offers to join hands with Dada Manohar Bhai, setting the stage for Raid 3.

== Cast ==
- Ajay Devgn as Amay Patnaik IRS, Commissioner of Income Tax, Bhoj
- Riteish Deshmukh as Manohar Dhankar alias Dada Manohar Bhai, Union Minister of Railways
- Vaani Kapoor as Malini Patnaik; Kapoor replaces Ileana D'Cruz from the original
- Rajat Kapoor as Anjani Kaul IRS, Chief Commissioner of Income Tax
- Saurabh Shukla as Rameshwar Singh / Ramj Tauji
- Supriya Pathak as Mrs. Dhankar a.k.a Amma, Dada Manohar Bhai's mother
- Amit Sial as Lallan Sudheer, Amay's colleague and Deputy Commissioner of Income Tax
- Shruti Pandey as Geeta Devi
- Brijendra Kala as Vinay Bakaya
- Yashpal Sharma as Devinder Gehlot
- Govind Namdev as Kunwar Kuldeep
- Jayant Rawal as ADC
- Pritisha Srivastava as Mini Patnaik, Amay and Malini's daughter
- Tarun Gehlot as Chhote Dhankar, Dada Manohar Bhai's younger brother
- Navneet Ranag as Mahant Choudhary
- Sanjeev Jhori as Ashok Kumar
- Madhavendra Jha as Vishal Mishra
- Ashish Gokhale as Ashish Verma
- Vikram Singh as Karan Yadav
- Vijay Rajoria as Bajaj
- Sushil Dhaiya as Chief Minister
- Ankur Sharma as Hawala Operator
- Vipin Kumar Singh as Abdul
- ItsIncubius as Ravi
- Ritika Shrotri as Jaya
- Umesh Shukla as Parle Chacha
- Sandeep Kapoor as Puneet Sahani
- Ayushi Nema as Anita
- Samayar Singh as Vikram Gadiyal
- Avijit Dutt as Lawyer Malani
- Devashish Mishra as Dada Manohar Bhai's defence lawyer
- Tamannaah Bhatia (special appearance in the song "Nasha")
- Jacqueline Fernandez (special appearance in the song "Money Money")
- Yo Yo Honey Singh (special appearances in the song "Money Money")

== Production ==
=== Casting ===
Ajay Devgn reprises his role as Amay Patnaik from the prequel. In January 2024, Riteish Deshmukh joined the cast. while Vaani Kapoor was cast alongside Devgn, replacing Ileana D'Cruz.

=== Filming ===
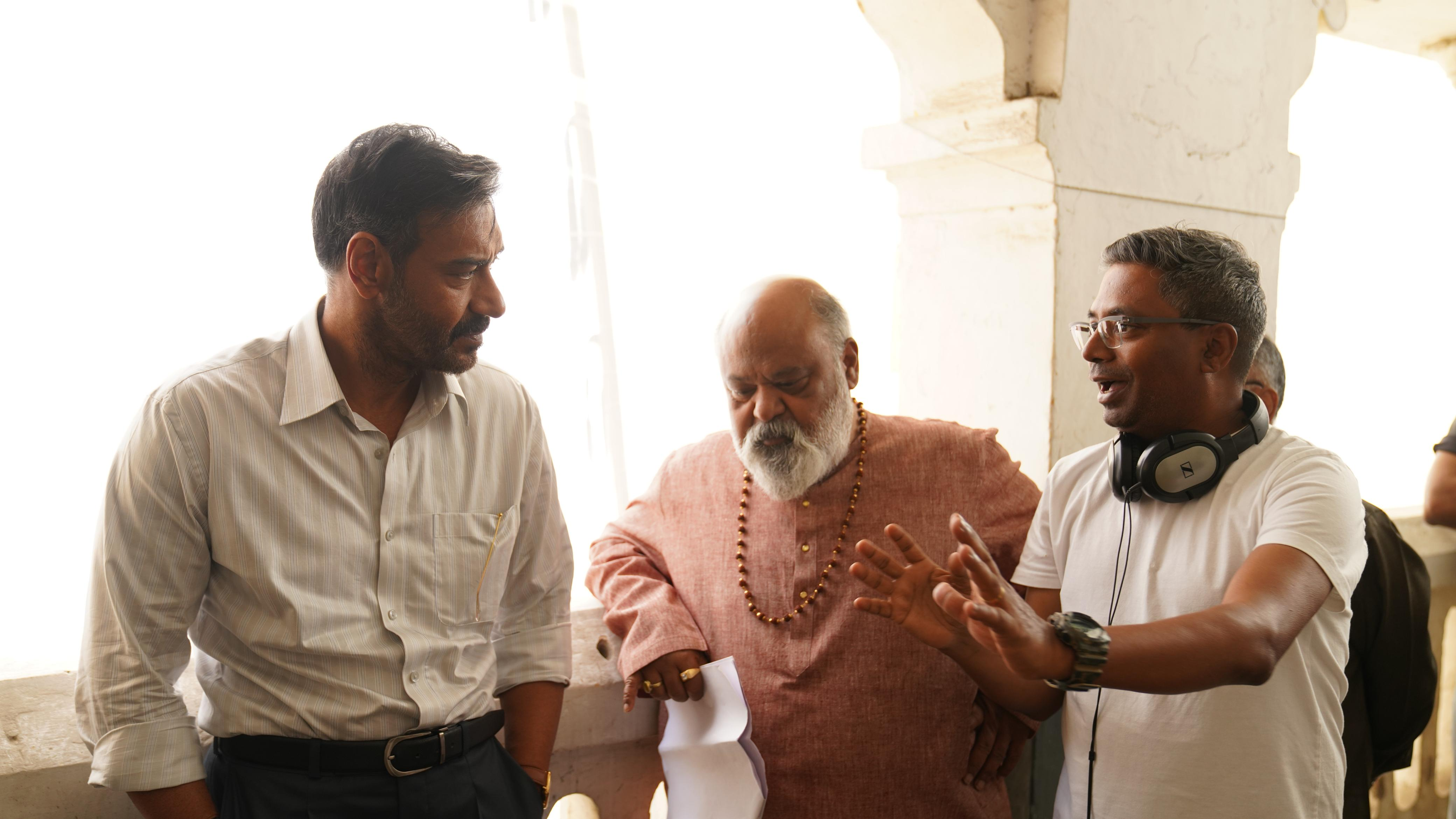
Raj Kumar Gupta on the sets of Raid 2 with Ajay Devgn and Saurabh Shukla.

Principal photography began on 6 January 2024 and took place in Mumbai, Delhi, Uttar Pradesh and Rajasthan. The muhurat shot of the film was given by Telugu star Ravi Teja, who headlined the 2024 Telugu remake of Raid. Primary filming wrapped up in April 2024, and patchwork was done by late-May 2024, bringing the film to post-production. Director Gupta decided to add two special item numbers before the release of the film after the entire filming was completed in May 2024. The 1st item song with singer-musician Yo Yo Honey Singh and actor Jacqueline Fernandez was filmed in last week of March 2025, while the item song with Tamannaah Bhatia was shot in a Mumbai studio in first week of April 2025 over two days, and has been choreographed by Vijay Ganguly.

== Soundtrack ==
Raid 2

Soundtrack album by Yo Yo Honey Singh, Rochak Kohli, Sachet–Parampara and White Noise Collectives
- Released: 30 April 2025
- Recorded: 2024–2025
- Genre: Feature film soundtrack
- Length: 14:25
- Language: Hindi
- Label: T-Series
External audio
- Raid 2 - Full Album on YouTube

The film's soundtrack is composed by Yo Yo Honey Singh, Rochak Kohli, Sachet–Parampara and White Noise Collectives while the background score is composed by Amit Trivedi.

The first single titled "Nasha" was released on 11 April 2025. The second single titled "Kamle" was released on 16 April 2025.

The song "Tumhe Dillagi" was recreation for the film by lyricist Manoj Muntashir and composer Rochak Kohli. Their original were written by Purnam Allahabadi and Nusrat Fateh Ali Khan and were composed by Nusrat Fateh Ali Khan. The fourth single titled "Money Money" was released on 22 April 2025.

Track listing
No.	Title	Lyrics	Music	Singer(s)	Length
1.	"Nasha"	Jaani	White Noise Collectives	Jasmine Sandlas, Sachet Tandon, Divya Kumar, Sumontho Mukherjee	3:00
2.	"Kamle"	Kausar Munir	Sachet–Parampara	Sachet–Parampara	3:52
3.	"Tumhe Dillagi"	Manoj Muntashir	Rochak Kohli	Jubin Nautiyal	4:12
4.	"Money Money"	Yo Yo Honey Singh	Yo Yo Honey Singh	Yo Yo Honey Singh	3:21
Total length:					14:25

== Release ==
=== Theatrical ===
Raid 2 was originally slated for a theatrical release in February 2025 but later rescheduled to be release on 1 May 2025, to make use of long weekend of International Labour Day and Maharashtra Day.

The film was released on 1 May 2025 after receiving a CBFC certificate of U/A 13+ rating. This was issued after a CBFC asked makers to do minor tweak with 8 seconds of dialogue. The film had received its certificate on 28 March 2025, an unusual move as most films get their certificate just 1 or 2 weeks before release.

=== Home media ===
The film began streaming on Netflix from 26 June 2025.

== Reception ==
=== Box office ===
The film opened with ₹19.71 crore in India and ₹27 crore worldwide. The film grossed over ₹100 crore including ₹14 crore from international markets in its opening weekend. It concluded its theatrical run with worldwide gross estimated to be ₹243.06 crore.

=== Critical response ===
Raid 2 received mixed-to-positive reviews from critics. The performances of Ajay Devgn and Riteish Deshmukh were widely praised, although some critics felt the narrative pacing lagged in parts. On the review aggregator website Rotten Tomatoes, 29% of 14 critics' reviews are positive, with an average rating of 5.3/10. Anuj Kumar of The Hindu wrote "In its second iteration, there is no value addition, only a thumping background score, often reserved for the Singhams of Bollywood". Rahul Desai of The Hollywood Reporter India gave a mixed review and wrote "Ajay Devgn’s Taxman Thriller is Taxing and Overstaffed".

Taran Adarsh of Bollywood Hungama gave the film 3.5 stars out of 5, stating, "Ajay Devgn delivers a restrained yet powerful performance, and Riteish Deshmukh is terrific in a pivotal role." Firstpost appreciated the film’s political undertones, noting, "Raid 2 is more layered than its predecessor and maintains tension throughout." NDTV gave it 2.5 stars, stating, "Despite strong performances, the sequel lacks the urgency and novelty of the original film." India Today described the film as "an engaging follow-up with commendable performances," but added that "a tighter screenplay could have elevated the impact." The Quint commented, "The film succeeds in rekindling the original’s intensity, even if the plot feels overly familiar at times."

Sunita Vijay of Garhwal Post gave the movie 2.5 out of 5 stars and wrote "Despite an impressive cast and ambitious scope, Raid 2 doesn’t quite live up to its predecessor nor disappoints". The Times of India gave 'Raid 2' 3 out of 5 stars, the review reads, " Relentless Patnaik (Devgn) is a thorn in the lives of the corrupt. He is the party pooper of the privileged who think they can evade law and hence, the chemistry and conflict that unravel once he goes digging has a comic-thrilling element to it. One does not expect efficiency or honesty from public servants let alone heroism and hence the anomaly makes for an interesting watch.." Renuka Vyavahare of Indiatimes gave the movie 3 out of 5 stars and wrote "Raid 2 stays true to its theme, but it takes itself a bit too seriously".

Rishabh Suri of Hindustan Times gave the movie 3 stars and wrote "Ajay Devgn and Riteish Deshmukh’s face off fares well in parts, weak villain brings film down". Sukanya Verma of Rediff gave the movie 2.5/5 stars and wrote "One felt unexplainable glee as worlds of wrongfully accumulated wealth came crashing down amidst righteous schadenfreude. But Gupta's hammy treatment and bombastic score strips the realism to turn Raid 2 into another hail the hero exercise".
