= Mr. Bachchan =

2024 Telugu film by Harish Shankar

- Theatrical release poster
- Directed by: Harish Shankar
- Written by: Harish Shankar
- Screenplay by: Satish Vegesna; Ramesh Reddy; Praveen Varma; Dattatreya; Tanvi Kesari
- Story by: Ritesh Shah
- Based on: Raid by Ritesh Shah
- Produced by: T. G. Vishwa Prasad; Vivek Kuchibotla; Bhushan Kumar; Krishan Kumar; Abhishek Pathak; Kumar Mangat Pathak
- Starring: Ravi Teja; Jagapathi Babu; Bhagyashri Borse
- Cinematography: Ayananka Bose
- Edited by: Ujwal Kulkarni
- Music by: Mickey J. Meyer
- Production companies: People Media Factory; T-Series Films; Panorama Studios
- Distributed by: Mythri Movie Makers
- Release date: 15 August 2024
- Running time: 160 minutes 149 minutes (Edited version)
- Language: Telugu
- Budget: ₹70 crore
- Box office: ₹10 crores

Mr. Bachchan is a 2024 Indian Telugu-language romantic action comedy film directed by Harish Shankar and jointly produced by People Media Factory, T-Series Films, and Panorama Studios. The film is the official remake of the Hindi film Raid (2018), which itself was based on the real-life income tax raid conducted on Indian industrialist Sardar Inder Singh. It stars Ravi Teja as the titular character, alongside Jagapathi Babu and Bhagyashri Borse (in her Telugu debut).

It follows a suspended income tax officer who romances a young woman in his hometown and plans to marry her, only to have his suspension end. He is enlisted to raid the mansion of a local political figure.

Mr. Bachchan was released on 15 August 2024 and was critically panned by critics and audiences. Owing to this, the film was trimmed by 13 minutes. It eventually emerged as a disaster at the box office, often considered as one of the well-known epitomes of box office bombs, in Tollywood pop culture.

== Plot ==
Anand, an Indian Revenue Service (IRS) officer known as "Mr. Bachchan" because of his admiration for Amitabh Bachchan, is suspended after confronting an influential individual during the course of his duties. He returns to his hometown, where he lives with his parents and meets Jikki, a young Marwari woman. The two gradually fall in love and decide to marry.

Anand's suspension is revoked when he is assigned to lead an Income Tax raid on the residence of Mutyam Jaggayya, a powerful Member of Parliament suspected of concealing large amounts of undisclosed wealth. Confident that the authorities will fail to uncover evidence, Jaggayya permits the raid while attempting to mislead the investigating officers.

As the search progresses, Anand and his team discover hidden cash and valuables despite repeated efforts by Jaggayya and his associates to obstruct the investigation. Jaggayya responds by using his political influence and intimidation to pressure the officers and threaten Anand's family. Anand must complete the operation while overcoming these obstacles and preparing for his upcoming wedding.

The confrontation develops into a strategic battle between Anand and Jaggayya, with Anand determined to expose the politician's illegal assets and uphold his duties despite the personal and professional risks involved.

== Cast ==
- Ravi Teja as Income Tax Officer Anand I.R.S/ Mr. Bachchan
- Jagapathi Babu as Mutyam Jaggayya
- Bhagyashri Borse as Jikki
- Tanikella Bharani as Ramgarh Thakur. Anand's Father
- Subhalekha Sudhakar as Politician
- Babu Mohan as Politician
- Annapurna as Jaggayaa's mother
- Gautami as Basanti, Anand's mother
- Sachin Khedekar as Pankaj
- Kalyani Natarajan as Jikki's mother
- Jhansi as Jhansi
- Satya as Dora Babu
- Prabhas Sreenu as Srinivas
- Chammak Chandra as Chitti Babu
- Satyam Rajesh as Anand's friend
- Vajja Venkata Giridhar as Balu
- Sudharshan as A1 Orchestra member
- Praveen as Income tax officer
- Aadukalam Naren as CM
- Ajay Rathnam
- Naga Mahesh as Jagga Rao
- B. V. S. Ravi as Chalapathi
- Gundu Sudarshan
- Pankaj Kesari as Muthyam Sambasiva, Mutyam Jaggayya's first younger brother
- Mani Chandana as Mutyam Prabhavathi, Mutyam Jaggayya's wife
- Killi Kranthi as Mutyam Chennakesava, Mutyam Jaggayya's second younger brother
- Gautam Raju as Raju
- Shilpa Chakravarthy as Mutyam Srilatha
- Maira Khan as Chennakesava's daughter
- Kishore Raju Vasishtha as IT Officer Team
- Siddhu Jonnalagadda as Youth Yuvraj (cameo appearance)
- Devi Sri Prasad in a special appearance in the song "Nallanchu Thellacheera"

== Production ==
The film was produced by People Media Factory. The film was produced with a budget of ₹70 crore (US$7.5 million).

== Music ==
Mr. Bachchan

Soundtrack album by Mickey J. Meyer
- Released: 14 August 2024
- Recorded: 2023–2024
- Genre: Soundtrack
- Length: 16:09
- Language: Telugu
- Label: T-Series

Mickey J. Meyer chronology
Operation Valentine (2024)	Mr. Bachchan (2024)	HIT: The Third Case (2025)

Official audio
- Audio Jukebox on YouTube

The music was composed by Mickey J. Meyer, collaborating with Harish Shankar for the third time after Subramanyam for Sale and Gaddalakonda Ganesh. The audio rights of the film were acquired by T-Series Telugu. On 10 July 2024, the film makers released "Sitar" song. The second single "Reppal Dappul" was released on 25 July 2024. The third single titled "Jikki" was released on 2 August 2024. The fourth single titled "Nallanchu Thellacheera" was released on 12 August 2024.

No.	Title	Lyrics	Singer(s)	Length
1.	"Sitar"	Sahithi	Saketh Komunduri, Sameera Bharadwaj	4:11
2.	"Reppal Dappul"	Kasarla Shyam	Anurag Kulkarni, Mangli	4:30
3.	"Jikki"	Vanamali	Karthik, Ramya Behara	3:29
4.	"Nallanchu Thellacheera"	Bhaskarabhatla	Sreerama Chandra, Dhanunjay Seepana, Sameera Bharadwaj, Ramya Behara	3:59
Total length:				16:09

== Release ==
=== Theatrical ===
Mr. Bachchan was theatrically released on 15 August 2024.

=== Home media ===
The film was premiered on Netflix from 12 September 2024.

== Reception ==
Mr. Bachchan received highly negative reviews from critics. Times Now's Sasidhar Adivi called it "a soulless adaptation of Raid" and gave a rating of 2 out of 5, stating "Mr Bachchan is action-heavy with the film relying mainly on Ravi Teja’s intense performance to build his case. But the film turns out to be an outdated commercial potboiler that lacks the required rigour and emotion". Calling it a "disappointment", a critic of Sakshi Post wrote ""Mr. Bachchan" attempts to recreate the magic of the 2018 Hindi film "Raid," which was based on a real-life income tax raid in the 1980s. However, this Telugu remake fails to capture the essence of the original. Director Harish Shankar, known for his successful adaptations, misses the mark here by infusing outdated comedy and forced romantic subplots that do little to enhance the story."

Calling it "masala-laden adaptation of Raid", Sangeetha Devi Dundoo of The Hindu opined that the film is "overdrawn, meandering mess", while praising the soundtrack. Avinash Ramachandran of The Indian Express gave a rating of 1.5 out of 5, criticized Harish Shankar's work and found the screenplay too routine. Aditya Devulapally of Cinema Express rated 1.5/5 stars and wrote "This Harish Shankar and Ravi Teja collaboration seems to be a true attempt at self-mockery and the fact that this is a remake doesn’t help either". Rating the film 1/5 stars, BVS Prakash of Deccan Chronicle wrote "A bizzare remake, stale jokes add to torture".
