= Kasaai =

Indian drama film

- Directed by: Gajendra S. Shrotriya
- Written by: Gajendra S. Shrotriya
- Based on: A story by Charan Singh Pathik
- Produced by: Gajendra S. Shrotriya; Utkarsh Indaliya; Nilesh Singhi
- Starring: Mita Vashisht; Mayur More; Amit Bimrot; Ravi Jhankal; Ashok Banthia; V K Sharma; Richa Meena
- Cinematography: Ashvin Ameri
- Music by: Shanker Indaliya
- Production company: ShemarooMe
- Distributed by: ShemarooMe Box Office
- Release date: 2019
- Country: India
- Language: Hindi

Kasaai (The Devil) is a 2019 Indian Hindi-language drama film directed by Gajendra Shrotriya and produced by ShemarooMe. The film stars Mita Vashisht, Mayur More, and Amit Bimrot. The narrative of the film is inspired by a true incident and is based on a story by Charan Singh Pathik, known for his work on Pataakha. The story revolves around a mother's struggle to seek justice for her son, set against a backdrop of political and social complexities in rural India.

== Plot summary ==
Set against the backdrop of village council elections in rural Rajasthan, the film delves into the life of Gulabi, a mother striving for justice after the untimely death of her 18-year-old son, Suraj. The tragedy unfolds when Suraj is killed by his impulsive father, Lakhan, in a fit of rage. As the family attempts to conceal the crime to safeguard their political ambitions, Gulabi confronts societal and familial challenges in her pursuit of truth.

== Cast and characters ==
- Mita Vashisht as Gulabi
- Mayur More as Suraj
- Amit Bimrot as Chhotu cameo
- Ravi Jhankal as Lakhan
- Ashok Banthia as Bhaggi Patel
- V.K. Sharma as Sarpanch Poornaram
- Richa Meena as Misri
- Raman Atre as Police Inspector
- Altaf Khan as Bhopa
- Vikas Pareek as Babu
- Manoj Swami as Ganeshi
- Jyoti Verma as Kasturi
- Teetu Verma as Dayal
- Sanjay Vidrohi as Krishna Patel
- Sarvesh Vyas as Jagan

== Release & reception ==
Kasaai premiered at the Jaipur International Film Festival in January 2019, where it received a Special Jury Mention Award. The film won Best Feature at the Open Window International Film Festival 2020 and received a special mention at the 11th Jaipur International Film Festival.

The film was released on ShemarooMe Box Office on 23 October 2020.

== Critical reception ==
Pooja Batra of India.com noted, "Kasaai- Rajasthan's story-land is very fertile. But for unknown reasons, Hindi cinema has been indifferent to the stories generated here. This film reduces this silence."

Subhash K. Jha of Spotboye rated the film 1.5 out of 5 stars and stated "Kasaai robs the theme of honour killing of all drama and dignity. Some of the actors try hard to breathe life into the inert drama. Except for Mita Vashisht, no actor seems comfortable in the environment of artificial tension."

Pooja Tiwari of Glamsham commented "Kasaai could have been a solid statement but still it’s an engaging human drama which is bracingly raw & rustic."
