= Pill (TV series) =

- Genre: Crime; Drama; Medical thriller
- Created by: Raj Kumar Gupta
- Written by: Raj Kumar Gupta; Anagh Mukherjee; Parveez Sheikh; Jaideep Yadav
- Directed by: Raj Kumar Gupta; Jaideep Yadav; Mahim Joshie
- Starring: Riteish Deshmukh; Pavan Malhotra; Akshat Chauhan; Anshul Chauhan; Vikram Dharia; Hanish Kaushal; Diksha Juneja
- Country of origin: India
- Original language: Hindi
- No. of seasons: 1
- No. of episodes: 8

Production
- Executive producers: Raj Kumar Gupta; Sanjeevkumar Nair
- Producer: Ronnie Screwvala
- Running time: 34–68 minutes

Original release
- Network: JioCinema
- Release: 12 July 2024

Pill is an Indian Hindi-language medical thriller streaming television series created by Raj Kumar Gupta. It stars Riteish Deshmukh, Pavan Malhotra, Akshat Chauhan, Anshul Chauhan, Vikram Dharia and Hanish Kaushal in prime roles.

== Cast ==
- Riteish Deshmukh as Prakash Chauhan
- Neha Saraf as Prakash's wife
- Anshul Chauhan as Gursimrat Kaur
- Hanish Kaushal as Samay
- Diksha Juneja as Keerat
- Akshat Chauhan as Noor Khan
- Pavan Malhotra as Brahma Gill
- Nikhil Khurana as Ekam Gill
- Baharul Islam as Dr. Basudev Natarajan
- Kunj Anand as Ashish
- Vikram Dharia as Raju Peon
- Sanghasri Sinha as Dr. Chakraborty Riteish Deshmukh's Senior

== Release ==
The series was premiered on 12 July 2024 on OTT platform JioCinema.

== Reception ==
Shubhra Gupta of The Indian Express gave a mix review " Judges giving instant, contradictory judgements from one hearing to another." Deepa Gahlot writing for Scroll.in gave positive review "The densely plotted, often naive eight-part series takes the mission of its characters very seriously, so they look solemn all the time." Rachit Gupta of Filmfare gave 3.5/5 stars and wrote "The performances by the entire cast are topnotch." Times Now gave 3/5 stars and commented "Pill could have been a more interesting thriller delving into the world of medicine creators and prescribers." Shreyas Pande of Cinema Express stated "Pill doesn’t rise away from the pre-established genre tropes and pitfalls into a plethora of undercooked ideas." Troy Ribeiro of The Free Press Journal observed "Overall, while the series has its minor flaws, including some deus ex machina elements that feel contrived, it remains engaging throughout, supported by top-notch production values." Vinamra Mathur of Firstpost gave a mix review "The series does keep you hooked, but Gupta relies little more on tired monologues and heroic ordinariness than exploring these helpless people’s vulnerabilities."
