= Raj Kumar Gupta =

Indian filmmaker (born 1977)

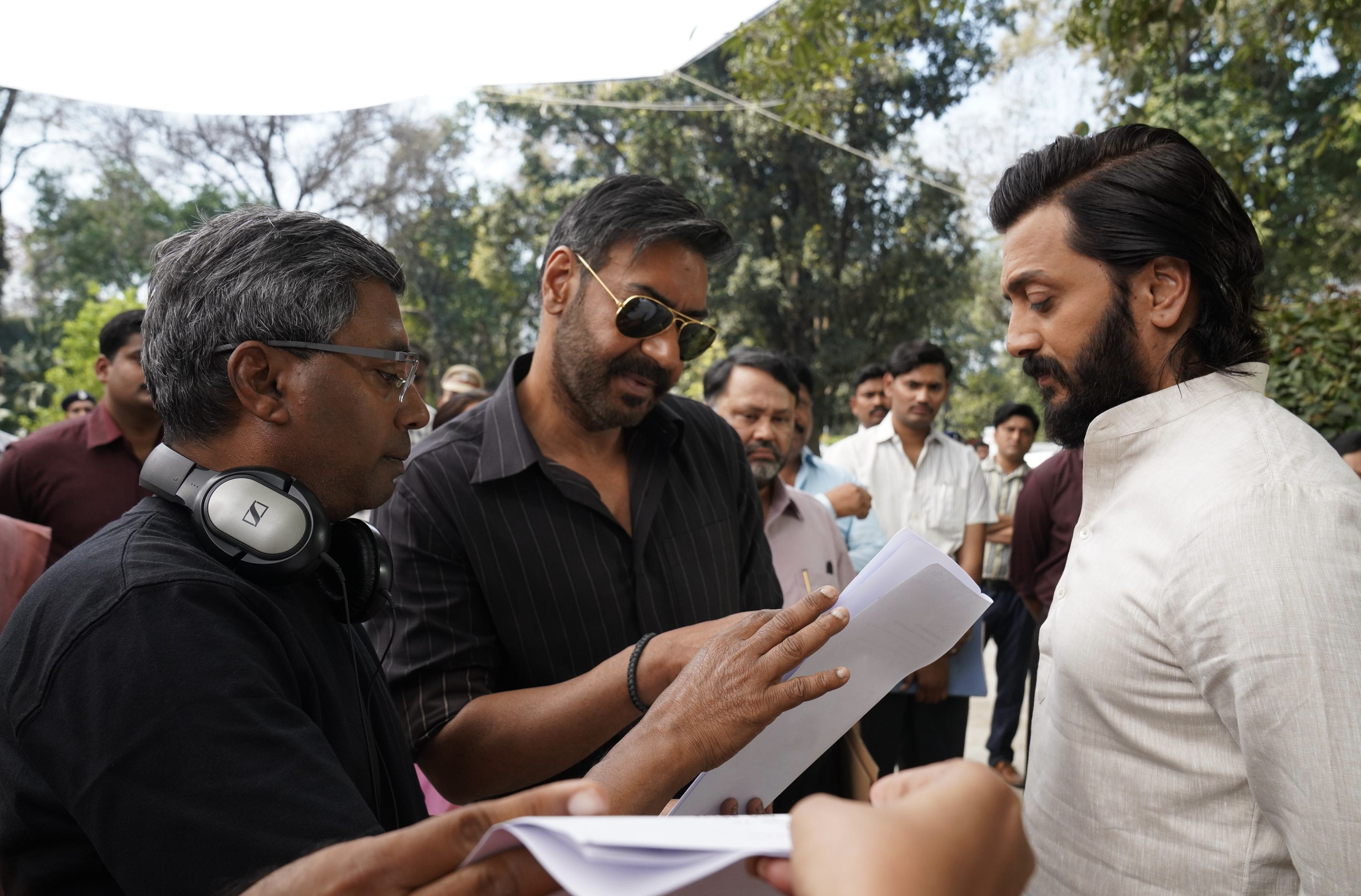
- Raj Kumar Gupta on the sets of Raid 2 with Ajay Devgn and Riteish Deshmukh
- Born: Hazaribagh, Jharkhand, India
- Education: Ramjas College; St. Xavier's School; Delhi Public School, Bokaro
- Occupations: Director, screenwriter, producer
- Years active: 2003–present

Raj Kumar Gupta is an Indian film writer and director, known for his work in Hindi cinema. He made his directorial debut with the acclaimed Aamir (2008) and has since directed the critically and commercially successful films like No One Killed Jessica (2011), Raid (2018) and Raid 2 (2025).

== Filmography ==
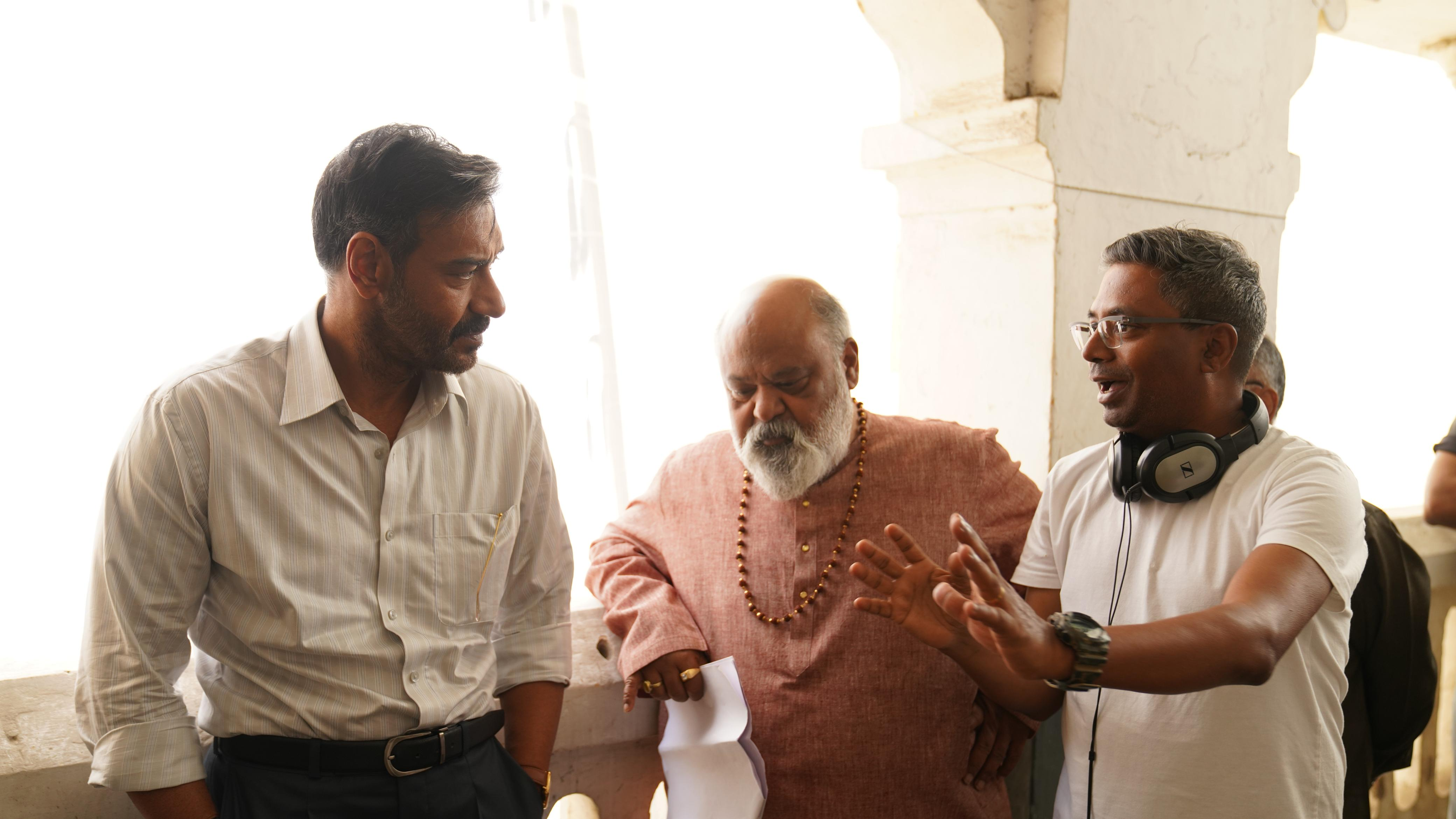
Raj Kumar Gupta on the sets of Raid 2 with Ajay Devgn & Saurabh Shukla

Year	Film	Notes
2008	Aamir	
2011	No One Killed Jessica	
2013	Ghanchakkar	
2018	Raid	
2019	India's Most Wanted	
2024	Pill	
2025	Raid 2	
