= Raid (2018 film) =

2018 Indian film by Raj Kumar Gupta

- Theatrical release poster
- Directed by: Raj Kumar Gupta
- Written by: Ritesh Shah
- Produced by: Abhishek Pathak; Kumar Mangat Pathak; Bhushan Kumar; Krishan Kumar
- Starring: Ajay Devgn; Ileana D'Cruz; Saurabh Shukla; Saanand Verma
- Cinematography: Alphonse Roy
- Edited by: Bodhaditya Banerjee
- Music by: Amit Trivedi
- Production companies: Panorama Studios; T-Series
- Distributed by: Viacom 18 Motion Pictures (India); Eros International (International)
- Release date: 16 March 2018
- Running time: 121 minutes
- Country: India
- Language: Hindi
- Budget: ₹40 crore
- Box office: ₹153.62 crore

Raid is a 2018 Indian Hindi-language crime thriller film directed by Raj Kumar Gupta starring Ajay Devgn, Saurabh Shukla and Ileana D'Cruz. Raid is based on the real life income-tax raid conducted by the officers of Income Tax Department on Sardar Inder Singh in the 1980s, which distinguished itself from others for being the longest raid in Indian history.

Raid was released theatrically in India on 16 March 2018 and became a critical and commercial success at the Box office. A sequel, Raid 2 was released in 2025.

== Plot ==
In 1981 an Indian Revenue Service (IRS) officer Amay Patnaik, who has just been transferred to Lucknow as Deputy Commissioner of Income Tax, where he lives happily with his wife Malini. One day, he receives an anonymous tip about black money hoarded by (Member of Parliament) Rameshwar Singh (Tauji), the don of Sitagarh, who had evaded income tax for a long time. Soon, Amay and his team, after much planning, head to Sitagarh.

There he and his team face opposition from Rameshwar's very hostile family, but he holds up to his ideals and integrity. He searches every nook and cranny of the house with his team to find the black money but without any success. After a few hours of searching, when all hope seems lost, he receives an anonymous letter, along with a map, revealing the location of the money in the house. Amay and his team break a statue to find stacks of money inside the statue, Moreover, when Tauji brings out his gun to shoot Amay, he accidentally fires on the ceiling revealing the assets Amay was crowd searching the force. Amay and his team break down more walls, ceilings, staircases and old storerooms to find assets worth crores (tens of millions). As an act of mercy, Amay lets Tauji leave the house to stop the raid as he is confident that he will take the assets before Tauji stops the raid.

He then meets the Chief Minister of Uttar Pradesh, who refuses any help as the Income Tax department is under the control of the Central Government and the raid is legal. The Central Finance Minister is persuaded to call Amay but is promptly rebuffed. A relentless Rameshwar meets several MPs, politicians, senior officers and even the Prime Minister of India, but to no avail. He then rallies his political support and threatens to topple the state cabinet unless the Prime Minister agrees to meet him. As the raid continues for a 3rd consecutive night, the PM and Rameshwar meet. The PM calls Amay and asks him to look for other legal options; Amay agrees to comply, as long as she furnishes a signed order through fax ordering Amay and his team to stop the raid, effectively negating the request.

The PM realises that a written order pressurizing the IRS Officer to stop the raid may reach the media and the Government may be brought into disrepute. She refuses to help and sends Rameshwar away. Frustrated, Rameshwar upon exhausting his political options, tries arranging an attack on Malini, who narrowly escapes an accident. On hearing this, Amay becomes furious but manages to control his anger.

Finally, on the 4th day, at noon, Rameshwar sends his henchmen and crowd enters Amay the locals to kill Amay and his team. A long battle ensues and a nearly defeated Amay is saved in the nick of time by a special police force sent in by the PM. Rameshwar is arrested and before being led away in handcuffs, he asks Amay about the identity of his informer. Amay refuses to divulge this information. It is later revealed that Rameshwar's youngest daughter-in-law was the informer; she and her lover wanted revenge on Rameshwar for forcing her to marry his impotent son as part of a political deal.

Rameshwar is seen wondering about the informer's identity in prison, while Amay gets transferred to another city with hopes of a brighter future.

== Cast ==
- Ajay Devgn as Amay Patnaik IRS, Deputy Commissioner of Income Tax, Malini's husband
- Saurabh Shukla as Rameshwar Singh/"Ramji"/"Tauji"
- Ileana D'Cruz as Malini Patnaik, Amay's wife
- Amit Sial as Lallan Sudheer, Amay's colleague
- Devas Dixit as Shashi Singh, Tara's husband
- Gayathiri Iyer as Mukta Yadav, Amay's colleague
- Sheeba Chaddha as Prabha Devi, Rakesh's wife
- Saanand Verma as Suraj Singh
- Sulagna Panigrahi as Tara Singh, Shashi's wife and Amay's informer in Tauji's house
- Geeta Agarwal Sharma as Reema
- Vikram Kochhar as ACP Shamsher
- Amit Bimrot as Satish Mishra, Income Tax Inspector and Amay's colleague
- Ravi Khanvilakar as Rakesh Singh
- Pravin Singh Sisodia as Anubhav Singh
- Pushpa Joshi as Amma ji
- Saurabhi Singh as Jaya
- Simran Nisha as Sushma
- Prakash Bajpai as Ramu Kaka
- Manju Shukla as Kaki
- Udayvir Singh as Shyam Bihari Lal, Director General of Income Tax
- Flora Jacob as Prime Minister Indira Gandhi
- Anil Rastogi as Finance Minister Raman Kumar
- R.C. Pathak as Chief Minister of Uttar Pradesh
- Ajay Singh as IT officer

== Production ==
=== Development ===
In August 2017, Raj Kumar Gupta made an official announcement about Ajay Devgn and Ileana D'Cruz being a part of his next film titled Raid. More than 40 theatre actors of Lucknow were selected to play various characters in the film.

=== Filming ===
The principal photography of Raid took place in Lucknow and Raebareli, and commenced in September 2017.

== Background ==
The film is loosely based on what is purported to be the longest-running Income Tax raid in history. On 16 July 1981, IT officials raided the house of a businessman, and Congress MLA and a former member of the Rajya Sabha, Sardar Inder Singh in Kanpur, Uttar Pradesh. The morning of July 16 began quietly enough. When Alok Kumar Batabyal, deputy director (Intelligence) who headed the raids on the first day, left his house in Swaroop Nagar with a group of other officers, nobody paid the slightest attention. They recovered undeclared assets worth ₹16 million (US$170,000) in cash and gold. The raid reportedly took 18 hours and 45 people to count the notes.

== Soundtrack ==
Raid

Soundtrack album by Amit Trivedi, Tanishk Bagchi
- Released: 1 March 2018
- Genre: Feature film soundtrack
- Length: 15:22
- Language: Hindi
- Label: T-Series
External audio
- Audio Jukebox on YouTube

Amit Trivedi chronology
Padman (2018)	Raid (2018)	Blackmail (2018)

Tanishk Bagchi chronology
Dil Juunglee (2018)	Raid (2018)	Fanney Khan (2018)

Singles from Raid
- 1. "Sanu Ek Pal Chain" Released: 12 February 2018; 2. "Nit Khair Manga" Released: 20 February 2018

The music of the film is composed by Tanishk Bagchi and Amit Trivedi while lyrics are penned by Manoj Muntashir and Indraneel. The first song of the film "Sanu Ek Pal Chain" which is sung by Rahat Fateh Ali Khan was released on 12 February 2018. The second track of the film titled as "Nit Khair Manga" which is also sung by Rahat Fateh Ali Khan released on 20 February 2018. Both the songs were originally composed by Ustad Nusrat Fateh Ali Khan and recreated by Tanishk Bagchi.

Track listing
No.	Title	Lyrics	Music	Singer(s)	Length
1.	"Sanu Ek Pal Chain"	Manoj Muntashir	Tanishk Bagchi	Rahat Fateh Ali Khan	3:30
2.	"Nit Khair Manga"	Manoj Muntashir	Tanishk Bagchi	Rahat Fateh Ali Khan	3:48
3.	"Black"	Indraneel	Amit Trivedi	Sukhwinder Singh	3:40
4.	"Jhuk Na Paunga"	Indraneel	Amit Trivedi	Papon	4:24
Total length:					15:22

== Reception ==
=== Box office ===
The film earned ₹100 million (US$1.0 million) on its first day and by the end of its first weekend the film had made a collection of ₹410 million (US$4.3 million). The film was a critical and commercial successful and also entered the 100 Crore Club in India. It earned over ₹150 crore (US$16 million) in its global theatrical run on a budget ₹40 crore (US$4.2 million) crore

=== Critical reception ===
The film received generally positive reviews from critics. On review aggregator website Rotten Tomatoes, the film holds an approval rating of 72% based on 19 reviews with an average rating of 5.8/10.

Rachit Gupta of Times of India found the screenplay of the film and Saurabh Shukla's acting performance to be impressive but criticized the songs which he felt were unnecessary and only acted as a distraction. Rachit gave the film a rating of 3.5 out of 5. Saibal Chatterjee of NDTV gave it 3.5 stars out of 5 saying "Devgn's brooding presence" made the film riveting. However, in a 1.5 out of 5-star review, The Indian Express called the movie "overlong and tepid". In 4 out of 5 star review for Bollywood Hungama, Taran Adarsh wrote that the film is a nail-biting thriller which "is smart, engaging, gripping and entertaining". Sweta Kausal of Hindustan Times praised the acting performances of Ajay Devgan and Saurabh Shukla but criticized the excessive length and the repetitive nature of the screenplay and gave the film a rating of 2.5 out of 5. Rajeev Masand of News18 found the movie to be impressive in parts but was critical of its editing and the second half's screenplay which he felt was weak. Among the actors, he felt that Saurabh Shukla's performance was exceptional, and gave the film a rating of 2.5 out of 5. Actor Ajay Devgn has won Best Foreign Actor award at the 27th China Golden Rooster and Hundred Flowers Film Festival for his role in film Raid.

== Awards and nominations ==
Date of ceremony	Awards	Category	Recipient(s) and nominee(s)	Result	Ref.
16 February 2019	Mirchi Music Awards	Recreated Song of the Year	"Sanu Ek Pal"	Won	

== Sequel and remake ==
In April 2020, Raid 2 was announced. Principal photography began in January 2024. The film stars Ajay Devgn, Riteish Deshmukh, Saurabh Shukla and Vaani Kapoor. It was released on 1 May 2025.

The film was remade in Telugu as Mr. Bachchan (2024) starring Ravi Teja and directed by Harish Shankar.
