= Kuwaarjeet Chopraa =

Indian film actor

Kuwaarjeet
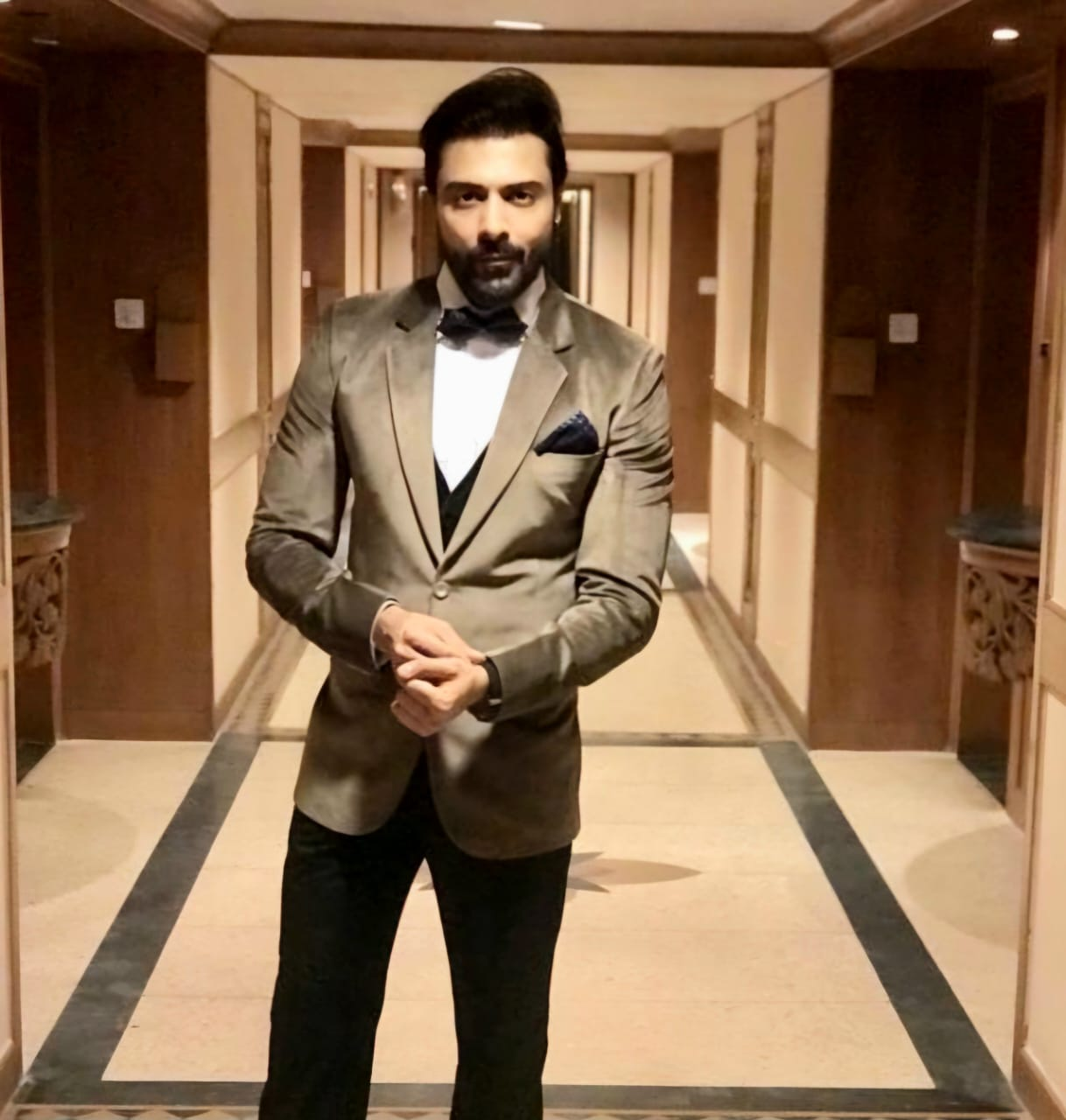
- Occupation: Actor
- Years active: 2016–present

Kuwaarjeet Chopra is an Indian actor who works in Hindi films.

== Filmography ==
Year	Movie	Role	Notes
2020	Torbaaz	Habibullah	Released on 11 December on Netflix
2021	Band of Maharajas	Pinta	Post-production

== See also ==
- List of Indian film actors
