= Torbaaz =

- Official release poster
- Directed by: Girish Malik
- Written by: Girish Malik; Bharti Jakhar
- Story by: Girish Malik; Bharti Jakhar
- Produced by: Raju Chadha; Rahul Mittra; Puneet Singh; Girish Malik; Amardeep S Reen
- Starring: Sanjay Dutt; Nargis Fakhri; Rahul Dev; Rahul Mittra; Kuwaarjeet Chopraa; Gavie Chahal
- Cinematography: Hiroo Keswani
- Edited by: Dilip Deo
- Music by: Bickram Ghosh; Vikram Montrose
- Production companies: Raju Chadha Films; Rahul Mittra Films; Clapstem Entertainment
- Distributed by: Netflix
- Release date: 11 December 2020
- Running time: 133 minutes
- Country: India
- Language: Hindi

Torbaaz (transl. Black Falcon) is a 2020 Indian Hindi-language sports drama film directed by Girish Malik. Sanjay Dutt plays the role of a medical professional that lost his wife and son while he was placed in the Indian Embassy in Kabul, while Nargis Fakhri and Rahul Dev play other prominent characters. Torbaaz was earlier scheduled for a theatrical release, which could not happen owing to the COVID-19 pandemic, after which the makers confirmed its distribution contract with Netflix. It was premiered on 11 December 2020 on Netflix.

== Plot ==
Naseer is an ex-army doctor who is visiting a refugee camp in Afghanistan. Whilst he is there, he recalls how he lost his wife and young son to a suicide terrorist attack, during his placement at the Indian Embassy, in Kabul. He, alongside Ayesha, works together to run his late wife’s NGO. Naseer tries to bring joy to the children in the camp, through cricket. He tries to make a team of displaced boys that were victims of the Afghan war. Naseer tries to get the boys to work together and put aside their differences through cricket. He constantly faces the threat of Qazar and his men, who want to use the boys as soldiers and suicide bombers.

== Cast ==
- Sanjay Dutt as Naseer
- Nargis Fakhri as Ayesha
- Rahul Dev as Qazar
- Fahim Fazli as Majed Taliban commander
- Gavie Chahal as Shariyar Khan
- Kuwaarjeet Chopraa as Habibullah
- Humayoon Shams Khan as Raghu
- Sneha Namanandi as Fawzia
- Rahul Mittra as Col Khan
- Rakshit Wahi as Dawlatzaahi
- Priyanka Verma as Meera
- Vansh Sayani as one of the boys in the group
- Rockey Raina as Abdullah
- Kourosh Torbat Zadeh as Sajadi
- Rudra Soni as Gulaab
- Jay Patel as Meharban Khan

== Production ==
Torbaaz was announced in September 2016. Nargis Fakhri was roped in for lead role after Sanjay Dutt.

Principal photography begun in December 2017. After shooting in Afghanistan, Torbaaz was majorly filmed in Bishkek, Kyrgyzstan becoming the first Indian film shot there.

Other filming locations included Mumbai, Manali (Himachal Pradesh) and Punjab, India.

== Release ==
Initially planned for a May 2019 theatrical release, Torbaaz was postponed to mid-2020, but due to cinemas shut down owing to COVID-19 pandemic, it was not able to release that time too. In July 2020, it was decided that Torbaaz was directly released online. It was released on 11 December 2020 on Netflix who purchased its digital and distribution rights.
