= Sardar Inder Singh =

Indian Sikh industrialist (1890–1983)

Member of Parliament, Rajya Sabha
- In office 3 April 1970 – 2 April 1976
- Constituency: Uttar Pradesh

Personal details
- Party: Indian National Congress

Sardar Inder Singh (1890–1983) was the leading Indian industrialist from the 1950s till his death in 1983. He founded the Steel re-rolling industry in India by installing India's First steel re-rolling mill, Singh Engineering Works, Kanpur. He went on to set up many industrial units and diversified by setting North India's largest railway wagon factory, Singh Wagon Factory and becoming the largest producer and supplier of Tie Bars to the Indian Railways. He was founder member and President of Merchants Chamber of UP and Chairman, Employers Association of Northern India. He was an MLA from Amritsar from 1946 to 1961 and MP, Rajya Sabha.

The 2018 film Raid is based on an income tax raid carried out against him.

== Personal life ==
Singh was married to Mohinder Kaur, and they had four sons and several other family members who were involved in his businesses. The 1981 raid extended to his wife, sons, sons-in-law, and other relatives, indicating a close-knit family structure tied to his industrial empire. Beyond this, details about his personal life are sparse in public records.

== 1981 Income Tax Raid ==
A significant and controversial event in Singh’s life was the 1981 income tax raid, one of the largest and longest in Indian history. On July 16, 1981, over 90 income tax officers and 200 policemen raided Singh’s residence in Kanpur’s Swaroop Nagar and other properties linked to his family and businesses, including Singh Engineering Works factories in Fazal Ganj and Panki. The raid, led by Deputy Director (Intelligence) Alak Kumar Batbyal, uncovered substantial unaccounted wealth, including Rs. 92 lakh in cash (equivalent to crores today), 250 tolas of gold(one tola equal to 11.66 grams of gold), two gold bars, jewelry, 144 guineas, and fixed deposits. The operation extended to 15 bank lockers in Kanpur, Delhi, and Mussoorie and continued for three nights and two days, with simultaneous raids on family members’ homes in upscale Kanpur neighborhoods like Tilak Nagar and Lajpat Nagar. The raid sent shockwaves across India, drawing public and media attention. Speculation suggested a family feud or political motives may have prompted the tip-off, though no official confirmation exists.
