= Pagleaazam =

Indian comedy film

- Theatrical release poster
- Directed by: Vikas P Kavthekar; APS Raghuvanshi
- Written by: Abhishek Bhagat
- Produced by: Aditya Pratap Singh Raghuvanshi; Prakhyata Singh
- Starring: Aditya Pratap Singh; Mandeep Kaur Mannnat; Sonia Sharma; Liliput; Mannat Procha; Ravi Mann; Abhinay Sharma; Sahil Patel; Amber Upadhyay
- Cinematography: Badal Mani
- Edited by: Joykumar
- Music by: Mohnish Bidwan
- Production company: Aps Entertainment
- Release date: 31 January 2020
- Country: India
- Language: Hindi

Pagleaazam is a 2020 Indian Hindi-language comedy film directed by Vikas P Kavthekar and APS Raghuvanshi starring Aditya Pratap Singh and Sonia Sharma. It was produced by Aditya Pratap Singh, Ram Agnihotri and Prakhyata Singh. The film was theatrically released in India on 31 January 2020.

== Plot ==
Pagleaazam is an uproarious comedy that follows the misadventures of three men who find themselves unceremoniously dumped by the same girl. However, their world takes a sudden and unexpected twist when Rahul crosses paths with Ishita, leading to a whirlwind of events that throws their lives into delightful disarray, leaving them trapped in a whirlwind of their own comedic chaos.

== Reception ==
- The Times of India has given 3/5.

== Cast ==
- Aditya Pratap Singh
- Sonia Sharma
- Mannat procha
- Liliput
- Ravi Mann
- Abhinay Sharma
- Sahil Patel
- Amber Upadhyay
