= Amit Bimrot =

Indian actor (born 1990)

- Born: Mehsana, Gujarat India
- Education: Film and Television Institute of India
- Occupation: Actor
- Years active: 2013-present
- Television: Raid, Bard of Blood, Made in China

Amit Bimrot is an Indian film and television actor known for his work in Hindi cinema and streaming platforms. He is best known for his performances in "Raid" (2018), "Made in China" (2019), and the Netflix espionage thriller series "Bard of Blood" (2019). A trained actor from the Film and Television Institute of India (FTII), Pune, Bimrot began his career in theatre before transitioning to films, digital series, and commercial advertising

== Early life and education ==
Bimrot was born in Mehsana, Gujarat and brought up in Alwar, Rajasthan. He studied film and acting at the Film and Television Institute of India (FTII, Pune) before moving to Mumbai to start his career as an actor. He was doing theatre in Jaipur. He was associated with Sarthak Theatre Group Association and was mentored by popular theatre artist Sabir Khan. After his move to Mumbai he did several advertisements and made his feature film debut with Ajay Devgn in the 2018 film Raid directed by Raj Kumar Gupta.

== Acting career ==
Bimrot made his Bollywood debut in 2018 with super hit film Raid. He next appeared in the web series Bard of Blood produced by Red Chilies Entertainment for Netflix. He has also worked in Dinesh Vijan production film Made in China. His next big venture is Abhishek Mamgain directed Barkha Sarkar where he will be seen playing struggling theater actor Badal Sarkar.

His television commercial work includes Parle G, JK Tyre and Vicks.

== Filmography ==
Year	Title	Film/Web Series	Character	Director
2018	Raid	Film	Satish Mishra	Raj Kumar Gupta
2019	Bard of Blood	Web Series	Nihar Gupta	Ribhu Dasgupta
2019	Made in China	Film	Ravi Panchal	Mikhil Musale
2020	Indoo Ki Jawani	FILM		Abir Sengupta
