= Love Ka Hai Intezaar =

- Written by: Nina Arora
- Creative director: Shashant Shah
- Starring: Preetika Rao; Mohit Sehgal; Keith Sequeira; Sanjeeda Sheikh
- Country of origin: India
- Original language: Hindi
- No. of seasons: 1
- No. of episodes: 120

Production
- Producer: Siddharth P. Malhotra
- Production locations: Rajasthan; Mumbai
- Running time: 23 minutes approx.
- Production company: Alchemy Films Pvt. Ltd.

Original release
- Network: Star Plus
- Release: 15 May – 30 September 2017

Love Ka Hai Intezaar (transl. Waiting for Love) is an Indian Hindi-language television romantic drama series, produced by Siddharth P. Malhotra. It was broadcasting worldwide on Star Plus, Mondays through Saturdays in an afternoon programming block called Star Dopahar. Sanjeeda Sheikh, Keith Sequeira and Sara Arfeen Khan. The show took a twenty-year leap after which Preetika Rao and Mohit Sehgal joined the cast.

The series ended on 30 September 2017 when the "Star Dopahar" block was discontinued.

== Summary ==
actress Kamini Mathur is at the peak of her career. Although assumed as a Bollywood diva, she is simple in her personal lives. Born to an IAS officer father Naman and artist mother Ragini, she has her middle-class values firmly in place.

Hardworking towards her values and talent, Kamini meets the righteous and ideal Madhav Ranawat, the king of Rajgarh who fulfills his duties well and is surrounded by luxuries. He is married and has a three-year-old girl, Madhavi. Passionately, Kamini and Madhav fall in love.

Madhav decides to divorce his wife Vijayalakshmi, who separates them. Pregnant, Kamini decides to raise her child separately. Mathurs move to Canada for sometime so she delivers her baby that will be introduced as her sibling to the world.

=== 20 years later ===
Retired from public life, Kamini lives with her family including her daughter Mohini and the widowed Ragini in Mumbai. Mohini assumes Kamini to be her sister. Madhavi is also grown up. Enters Ayaan Mehta, for whom Mohini and Madhavi fall but he has feelings for Mohini.

Madhav and Kamini meet each other. The misunderstandings sort out. Madhav accepts Mohini; Vijayalakshmi is exposed. Kamini realises he broke up with her in a letter so it would be easy for her to hate him and move on. They unite. Madhavi realises where Madhav's true happiness lies and that Ayaan and Mohini are meant to be together.

== Cast ==
=== Main ===
- Mohit Sehgal as Ayaan Mehta, Inder's son, Mohini and Madhavi's love interest
- Preetika Rao as Mohini Ranawat, Kamini and Madhav's daughter, Madhavi's half sister, Ayaan's love interest
- Sanjeeda Sheikh as Kamini Mathur, Madhav's former lover, Mohini's mother
  - Samriddhi Yadav as young Kamini Mathur
- Keith Sequeira as Maharaja Madhav Ranawat, Vijayalakshmi's husband and Kamini's former lover, Madhavi and Mohini's father

=== Recurring ===
- Sara Arfeen Khan as Maharani Vijayalakshmi Ranawat (née Singh), Madhav's wife, Madhavi's mother
- Heena Parmar as Madhavi Ranawat, Vijayalakshmi and Madhav's daughter, Mohini's half sister
- Soni Razdan as Rajmata Rajeshwari Ranawat, Madhav's mother, Mohini and Madhavi's paternal grandmother
- Saptrishi Ghosh as Inder Mehta, Ayaan's father
- Khalid Siddiqui as Suyyash Thakur
- Natasha Rastogi as Ragini Mathur, Kamini, Anusha and Milisha's mother, Mohini's maternal grandmother
- Yogendra Tiku as Naman Mathur, Kamini, Anusha and Milisha's father, Mohini's maternal grandfather
- Dimple Chawla as Anusha "Anu" Mathur, Kamini's first younger sister
- Mugdha Meharia as Milisha "Mili" Mathur, Kamini's second younger sister
- Rahul Verma as Ravindra Rajput
- Shishir Sharma as Rantej "Rana" Singh, Vijayalakshmi's father, Madhavi's maternal grandfather
