= Ikka (film) =

2026 Indian film by Siddharth P. Malhotra

- Official release poster
- Directed by: Siddharth P. Malhotra
- Screenplay by: Althea Kaushal; Mayank Tewari
- Dialogues by: Mayank Tewari
- Story by: Althea Kaushal
- Produced by: Sapna Malhotra; Siddharth P. Malhotra
- Starring: Sunny Deol; Akshaye Khanna; Dia Mirza; Tillotama Shome
- Cinematography: Jishnu Bhattacharjee
- Edited by: Shweta Venkat Mathew
- Music by: Songs: Mithoon; Score: Julius Packiam
- Production company: Alchemy Films
- Distributed by: Netflix
- Release date: 10 July 2026
- Running time: 140 minutes
- Country: India
- Language: Hindi

Ikka (transl. Ace) is a 2026 Indian Hindi-language legal thriller film directed and produced by Siddharth P. Malhotra. It stars Sunny Deol, Akshaye Khanna, Dia Mirza, and Tillotama Shome. The film follows a celebrated, incorruptible ace lawyer who faces a moral dilemma when he is forced to defend a degenerate, accused of homicide, to save his daughter. It premiered on Netflix on 10 July 2026.

== Plot ==
A young woman, Soma Mittal, is found critically injured on a roadside after being thrown from a moving vehicle, having spent the evening at a nightclub with wealthy businessman Shauryaman Gaur. Shauryaman is arrested for attempted murder, but the case draws immense media scrutiny due to his family's political influence. His father approaches Arjun Mehra – a principled, incorruptible criminal defence lawyer known in the legal community as "Ikka" for his impeccable courtroom record – to defend his son. Arjun immediately refuses, having previously been responsible for Shauryaman's disbarment from practicing law.

Arjun is happily married to Avantika. Meanwhile, their daughter, Samaira, collapses during a swimming competition and is diagnosed with advanced-stage leukemia. Doctors state she requires an urgent stem cell transplant from a compatible biological parent, but tests reveal that neither Arjun nor Avantika, is a match. It is then revealed that Avantika was in a relationship with Shauryaman before marrying Arjun, and that Shauryaman is Samaira's biological father. Just after becoming pregnant, Avantika had severed all ties with Shauryaman after discovering his sinister nature. Fully aware of her past and her pregnancy, Arjun chose to marry Avantika, and the two are deeply devoted to each other. Despite the truth about Samaira's parentage, Arjun loves and raises her as his own daughter, considering her his whole world. Shauryaman leverages this, agreeing to donate his bone marrow only if Arjun secures his acquittal in court. To save his daughter, Arjun reluctantly accepts the case, despite the battle within.

Madhura Banerjee, a public prosecutor and junior advocate, is assigned to lead the state's case. She presents formidable circumstantial and forensic evidence, including traces of Soma's blood on Shauryaman's car, a DNA report confirming a match, proof that the vehicle was chemically cleaned, and witness testimony placing Shauryaman at the crime scene. During the trial, Soma succumbs to her injuries, elevating the charge to homicide, which turns public and social outrage against Arjun. Despite his deep moral conflict and profound sympathy for Soma, Arjun mounts a ruthless legal defence of Shauryaman. Refusing to malign Soma's character, he instead exposes flaws in the police investigation and methodically raises reasonable doubt. He strategically manipulates Madhura into calling Shauryaman’s wife, Gauri, to the stand, where Gauri testifies that Shauryaman used to beat her every night due to his drinking habit. When Gauri alters her timeline to incriminate her husband, Arjun counters by producing emergency police call recordings from the night of the crime, where Gauri is heard reporting domestic violence. This establishes an alibi that Shauryaman was at home when the murder took place. After Arjun dismantles the prosecution's timeline, the court acquits Shauryaman, and Samaira's bone marrow transplant is successfully completed.

Afterward, Shauryaman invites Arjun to celebrate, believing the domestic violence defence was Arjun's final courtroom strategy. However, Arjun reveals to Shauryaman that he knew of Shauryaman's guilt all along – he tried to rape Soma in the car and killed her in anger when she resisted. Arjun uncovers how Shauryaman had used the mobile phone of a slum dweller on the night of the murder to call his wife and forge a digital alibi. He further exposes that the domestic violence call by Gauri was staged; the voice on the emergency recording actually belonged to Shauryaman's accomplice, Chatur. Chatur had inadvertently self-incriminated during a prison visit by mispronouncing Gauri's name in the exact manner heard on the tape. To eliminate the final link to the crime, Shauryaman had ordered Chatur to murder the slum dweller. Armed with this new, foolproof evidence of criminal conspiracy, homicide, and another attempted murder, Arjun hands the irrefutable proof to Madhura and the authorities, ensuring that Shauryaman is re-arrested for good and that justice for Soma and her mother is finally served.

== Cast ==
- Sunny Deol as Arjun Mehra / Ikka
- Akshaye Khanna as Shauryaman Gaur
- Dia Mirza as Avantika Mehra, Arjun's wife
- Tillotama Shome as Madhura Banerjee, Public prosecutor
- Sanjeeda Sheikh as Gauri Gaur, Shauryaman's wife (special appearance)
- Daria Bedi as Samaira Mehra, Arjun and Avantika's daughter
- Shishir Sharma as Harshvardhan Gaur, Shauryaman's father
- Vijay Vikram Singh as Judge Kamra
- Jyoti Mukerji as Soma's mother
- Akansha Ranjan Kapoor as Soma Mittal (special appearance)
- Ivan Rodrigues as Dr. Galvankar, Oncologist
- Gurinder Singh Pawar as Abhimanyu
- Nayan Jadhav as Inspector Dattarao Gokhale

== Production ==
=== Development ===
Ikka was announced by Netflix on 3 February 2026 as part of its 2026 Indian content slate. The film is directed by Siddharth P. Malhotra and produced by Sapna Malhotra and Siddharth P. Malhotra under the banner Alchemy Films. The screenplay was written by Althea Kaushal and Mayank Tewari. The project marked the on-screen reunion of Sunny Deol and Akshaye Khanna nearly three decades after their appearance together in Border (1997). At the announcement, the cast also included Dia Mirza, Tillotama Shome, Sanjeeda Shaikh, Daria Bedi, Shishir Sharma, and Akansha Ranjan Kapoor. Director Siddharth P. Malhotra conceived Ikka with Sunny Deol in the titular role and subsequently cast Akshaye Khanna as the film's second lead, saying they were "simply the right actors for the story". He revealed that Deol agreed to the project after being impressed by the script, while Khanna read the screenplay in a single sitting before accepting the role. Malhotra also noted that the film explores the moral grey areas of justice and was conceived to present Deol in a character different from his conventional larger-than-life screen persona.

=== Filming ===
Principal photography began in November 2025 and was completed in December 2025. Director Siddharth P. Malhotra revealed that the film, originally scheduled for a 55-day shoot, was completed in just 30 eight-hour shifts, crediting his extensive pre-production planning and the trust of the cast, particularly Deol and Khanna, the latter of whom was also shooting for Dhurandhar at the time. Post-production concluded by the end of March 2026, with Netflix receiving the first cut earlier that month.

== Music ==
Ikka

Soundtrack album by Mithoon
- Released: 9 July 2026
- Recorded: 2026
- Genres: Motion Picture Soundtrack; Hindi Film Music; Hip-hop
- Length: 14:31
- Languages: Hindi; English
- Label: Zee Music Company
- Producer: Mithoon

Mithoon chronology
Border 2 (2026)	Ikka (2026)	Awarapan 2 (2026)
External audio
- Ikka – Full Album on YouTube
Singles from Ikka
- 1. "Woh Ikka Hai" Released: 6 July 2026; 2. "Papa Ki Jaan" Released: 9 July 2026; 3. "The Battle Within (Ikka Theme)" Released: 9 July 2026

The film's songs are composed by Mithoon, with lyrics by Sayeed Quadri and Raja Kumari, while the background score is composed by Julius Packiam.

No.	Title	Lyrics	Music	Singer(s)	Length
1.	"Woh Ikka Hai"	Sayeed Quadri (Hindi), Raja Kumari (English)	Mithoon	Vishal Dadlani (Hindi), Raja Kumari (English)	4:02
2.	"Papa Ki Jaan"	Sayeed Quadri	Mithoon	Shaan	6:01
3.	"The Battle Within" (Ikka Theme)	—	Mithoon	Instrumental	4:28
Total length:					14:31

== Release ==
The film was released on Netflix on 10 July 2026.

== Reception ==
On the review aggregator website Rotten Tomatoes, 46% of 13 critics' reviews are positive, with an average rating of 5/10.

Tanisha Bhattacharya of NDTV rated it 3.5 stars out of 5 and observed that "Ikka keeps you guessing; the twists never feel forced. The editing could be a little crisper, but the final blow lets you overlook it." Anuj Kumar of The Hindu writes in his review that "Director Siddharth Malhotra puts together a puzzle where not all the pieces come together, but it whets the guilty pleasure". Renuka Vyavahare of The Times of India gave 2.5 stars out of 5 and said that "Ikka unfolds like a quintessential '90s courtroom potboiler, often at odds with Netflix's contemporary sensibilities." Sana Farzeen of India Today gave 2.5 stars out of 5 and stated that "Ikka believes he is holding the ace card until the very end. Unfortunately, by the time he puts that card on the table, the audience has already guessed the hand."

Rishabh Suri of Hindustan Times also rated it 2.5/5 stars and said that "Ikka doesn't leave you debating its twists or admiring its legal fight as the best courtroom dramas often do. Instead, it leaves you wondering how a film with Sunny Deol and Akshaye Khanna ended up feeling this ordinary." Shilajit Mitra of The Hollywood Reporter India writes that "A three-way staring match between Sunny Deol, Akshaye Khanna and Tillotama Shome, the old-school pleasures of Sidharth P Malhotra's film dry up in time." Nandini Ramnath of Scroll.in observed that "Ikka gradually coalesces around its brawny-and-brainy hero, who gets to play both defence lawyer and prosecutor." Bollywood Hungama rated it 2.5/5 stars and said that "On the whole, Ikka rests on the star power of Sunny Deol and Akshaye Khanna and a few powerful moments. At the same time, the film suffers due to a weak script."
