= Shaque (TV series) =

- Also known as: Shaque: Trust No One
- Genre: Mystery; Thriller
- Written by: Rensil D'Silva
- Directed by: Rensil D'Silva
- Starring: Parineeti Chopra; Jennifer Winget; Soni Razdan; Anup Soni; Tahir Raj Bhasin; Sumeet Vyas; Harleen Sethi; Dhruv Choudhry
- Composer: Raju Singh
- Country of origin: India
- Original language: Hindi
- No. of seasons: 1
- No. of episodes: 7

Production
- Producers: Siddharth P. Malhotra; Sapna Malhotra
- Running time: 32–44 mins
- Production company: Alchemy Productions

Original release
- Network: Netflix
- Release: 24 September 2026

Shaque: Trust No One (lit. 'Doubt: Trust No One', transl. Suspicion: Trust No One) is a Hindi-language mystery thriller television series written and directed by Rensil D'Silva. Produced by Siddharth P. Malhotra and Sapna Malhotra under Alchemy Productions. The series features Parineeti Chopra, Jennifer Winget, Soni Razdan, Anup Soni, Tahir Raj Bhasin, Sumeet Vyas, Harleen Sethi and Dhruv Choudhry. The series was released on Netflix on 24 September 2026.

== Cast ==
- Parineeti Chopra as Anvita "Ani" Dutt, Alok’s Wife
- Jennifer Winget as Sakshi Mathur
- Soni Razdan as Madhu Dutt, Alok's mother
- Anup Soni as Inspector Khurana
- Tahir Raj Bhasin as Alok Dutt, Anvita's husband, Shreya’s Boyfriend
- Sumeet Vyas as Dr. Bhaskar, Shreya’s Husband
- Harleen Sethi as Shreya, Bhaskar's wife, Alok’s Girlfriend
- Dhruv Choudhry as Gaurav Mathur, Sakshi's husband
- Tarana Raja Kapoor as Lajwanti, Sakshi and Gaurav’s caretaker
- Veer Rajwant Singh as Baldev
- Trisha Singh Bisht as Apeksha/Rhea, Alok Dutt and Anvita Dutt’s daughter/ Sakshi and Gaurav’s adopted daughter.
- Ebadat Hussain as Siddhi, Alok Dutt and Anvita Dutt’s daughter, Apeksha’s sister.

== Episodes ==
No.	Title	Directed by	Written by	Original release date
1	"The Package"	Rensil D'Silva	Rensil D'Silva	September 24, 2026
On her daughter's ninth birthday, Anvita receives another mysterious package containing an updated photo of her abducted child, reigniting her obsessive search and straining her relationship with Alok.
2	"Whispers in Shimla"	Rensil D'Silva	Rensil D'Silva	September 24, 2026
Anvita tracks the postmark of the package to a remote area in Shimla, where she begins experiencing vivid visual hallucinations that blur the line between reality and trauma.
3	"Shadows of Doubt"	Rensil D'Silva	Rensil D'Silva	September 24, 2026
Inspector Khurana reopens the official kidnapping case under pressure, while Sakshi's sudden appearance unearths hidden friction and secrets within the Dutt family.
4	"Deception"	Rensil D'Silva	Rensil D'Silva	September 24, 2026
Anvita discovers evidence of an extra-marital affair, leading her to suspect that someone in her immediate inner circle deliberately orchestrated the hospital abduction.
5	"Madhu's Wall"	Rensil D'Silva	Rensil D'Silva	September 24, 2026
As Anvita edges closer to the truth, her mother-in-law Madhu takes drastic steps to block the investigation, revealing how far she will go to protect the family's public image.
6	"The Mind's Eye"	Rensil D'Silva	Rensil D'Silva	September 24, 2026
Dr. Bhaskar attempts to treat Anvita's worsening psychological state as her hallucinations intensify, unwittingly uncovering a vital piece of the physical evidence trail.
7	"Trust No One"	Rensil D'Silva	Rensil D'Silva	September 24, 2026
Shreya delivers a series of shocking revelations that tie the final pieces of the mystery together, exposing a web of betrayal that changes Anvita's life forever.

== Production ==
=== Development ===
The series was officially commissioned by Netflix, with Rensil D'silva serving as director, while Alchemy Productions managed the production. Siddharth P. Malhotra stated that the project was originally conceived as Shaque, but the makers could not obtain the title. The series was subsequently titled as Talaash: A Mother’s Search.

=== Casting ===
Parineeti Chopra, Harleen Sethi, Jennifer Winget, Tahir Raj Bhasin, Soni Razdan, Chaitanya Choudhry, Sumeet Vyas and Anup Soni are part of the cast.

=== Filming ===
Principal photography of the series commenced in February 2025, and filming concluded in April 2025. The filming took place in Shimla.

== Music ==
Shaque: Trust No One

Soundtrack album by Raju Singh and Joshua Singh
- Released: September 24, 2026
- Genre: Soundtrack
- Length: 51:44
- Language: Hindi
- Label: Netflix Music, LLC
External audio
- Shaque | Official Soundtrack | Netflix playlist on YouTube

The soundtrack for Shaque is composed by Raju Singh and Joshua Singh.

Tracklisting
No.	Title	Length
1.	"Shaque - Title Theme"	01:16
2.	"Hunted"	01:16
3.	"Pieces Of The Truth"	03:28
4.	"Reality Shift - Static"	01:47
5.	"Reality Shift - Happy Birthday Baby"	03:18
6.	"Dirty Deal"	01:54
7.	"Is it You?"	01:00
8.	"Ritual Path"	01:46
9.	"Blind Faith"	02:03
10.	"Reality Shift - Don't Listen To This"	04:30
11.	"Slow Burn Shaque"	02:54
12.	"No Turning Back"	01:42
13.	"Poison"	03:50
14.	"Blackmail"	01:38
15.	"Pieces of a Pattern"	01:30
16.	"Midnight Offering"	02:16
17.	"Start Of A Lie"	01:54
18.	"End Of A Lie"	02:02
19.	"Bloom"	01:17
20.	"Behind Her Smile"	02:04
21.	"Running Blind"	01:45
22.	"In Plain Sight"	01:16
23.	"Broken Trust"	01:34
24.	"The Aftermath - End Credits"	03:44
Total length:		51:44

== Release ==
In February 2026, Netflix revealed its slate lineup for 2026. It was retitled Shaque: Trust No One ahead of release. The trailer launch event was held on 10 September 2026.

Ahead of its premiere, a special screening of the series was held in Delhi on 23 September 2026. The series was made available to stream on Netflix on 24 September 2026.
