= Doctors (2024 TV series) =

- Release poster
- Genre: Medical drama
- Written by: Siddharth P. Malhotra
- Directed by: Sahir Raza
- Starring: Sharad Kelkar; Harleen Sethi; Aamir Ali; Viraf Patel
- Music by: Soutrik Chakraborty
- Country of origin: India
- Original language: Hindi
- No. of episodes: 10

Production
- Producers: Jyoti Deshpande; Siddharth P. Malhotra; Sapna Malhotra
- Production location: Mumbai
- Cinematography: Vivian Singh Sahi
- Editor: Satya Sharma
- Camera setup: Multi-camera
- Running time: 31-48 mins
- Production companies: Alchemy Films Pvt Ltd; Jio Studios

Original release
- Network: JioCinema
- Release: 27 December 2024

Doctors is an Indian Hindi-language medical drama television series written by Siddharth P. Malhotra and directed by Sahir Raza. Produced by Jyoti Deshpande, Siddharth P. Malhotra and Sapna Malhotra under Alchemy Films Pvt Ltd and Jio Studios, it stars Sharad Kelkar, Harleen Sethi, Aamir Ali and Viraf Patel. It premiered on JioCinema on 27 December 2024.

== Synopsis ==
The series delves into the lives of newly appointed resident doctors, surgeons, nurses, and terminally ill patients at the Elizabeth Blackwell Medical Centre in Mumbai. At the centre of it all are two lead characters—resident doctor Nitya Vasu (Harleen Sethi), who has joined with a motive for revenge, defined in the opening episode, and neurosurgeon Dr Ishaan Ahuja (Sharad Kelkar), whom Nitya believes is responsible for her brother Dhawal’s (Aamir Ali) botched surgery that left him with permanent damage.

== Cast ==
- Sharad Kelkar as Dr. Ishaan Ahuja
- Harleen Sethi as Dr. Nitya Vasu
- Aamir Ali as Dr. Dhaval Vasu
- Viraf Patel as Dr. Abhijat Gupta
- Vivaan Shah as Dr. Roy Saldanha
- Abhishekh Khan as Dr. Ridhun Sethi
- Niharika Lyra Dutt as Dr. Keyuri "Kay" Patel
- Sarah Hashmi as Dr. Nahida Jaffri
- Vansh Sethi as Dr. Neil Shastri

== Production ==
The series was announced on JioCinema. Principal photography of the series began in September 2022. The trailer of the series was released in 16 December 2024.

== Reception ==
Mayur Sanap of Rediff.com rated the series 3.5/5 stars. Shubhra Gupta of The Indian Express gave the series 3.5 out of 5. Abhimanyu Mathur writing for Hindustan Times reviewed the series as a palatable and binge-worthy drama.
