= Kaho Na Yaar Hai =

- Created by: Optimystix Entertainment
- Starring: Sanaya Irani; Karishma Tanna; Mouni Roy
- Opening theme: "Kaho Na Yaar Hai" by Aashu Aur Dhruv
- Country of origin: India
- Original language: Hindi

Original release
- Network: STAR Plus
- Release: 18 January – 18 April 2008

Kaho Na Yaar Hai is a friend-based reality show that aired on STAR Plus channel, and was hosted by Karan Patel. It started on 18 January 2008.

== Host ==
- Karan Patel

== Participant ==
Episode	Participant 1	Participant 2	Episode	Participant 1	Participant 2
1	Sonu Nigam	Mallika Sherawat	2	Ronit Roy	Mrityunjay kumar
3	Parmeet Sethi	Archana Puran Singh	4	Yash Tonk	Rajshree Thakur
5	Pulkit Samrat	Mouni Roy	6	Aditya Narayan	Karishma Tanna
7	Sajid Khan ... Maker Of Heyy Babyy	Dia Mirza	8	Akashdeep Saigal	Rakshanda Khan
9	Hussain Kuwajerwala, Tina Kuwajerwala (as players)	Aamir Ali, Sanjeeda Sheikh (as players)	10	Isha Koppikar	Sonu Sood
11	Juhi Parmar	Varun Badola	12	Deven Bhojani Representing Gattu Of Baa Bahu Aur Baby	Chaitanya Choudhury Representing Sagar Of Sangam
13	---	Episode 6 repeated where Episode 13 scheduled to telecast	14	Juhi Chawla	Sunil Shetty

== Game Tasks ==
- Kya Yahi Yaar Hai ... Round (Task) 1
- Yaar Hoshiyaar ... Round (Task) 2
- Yaara Da Tashan ... Round (Task) 3
- Yaar Ya Paar ... Round (Task) 4 [Final]

== Prizes ==
- 3 Night - 4 Day Trip To Pattaya ... For Winner.
- 3 Night - 4 Day Trip To South-east Asia's Exotic Country ... For Winner.(episode 7 only)
- iPod ... For Runner UP By STAR Plus.
