= Be Happy (film) =

2025 film by Remo D'Souza

- Release poster
- Directed by: Remo D'Souza
- Written by: Remo D'Souza; Tushar Hiranandani; Kanishka Deo; Chirag Garg
- Produced by: Lizelle Remo D'Souza
- Starring: Abhishek Bachchan; Inayat Verma; Nora Fatehi
- Cinematography: Vijay Kumar Arora
- Edited by: Sherwin Bernard
- Music by: Harsh Upadhyay
- Production company: Remo D'Souza Entertainment
- Distributed by: Metro-Goldwyn-Mayer (through Amazon MGM Studios)
- Release date: 14 March 2025
- Running time: 130 minutes
- Country: India
- Language: Hindi

Be Happy is a 2025 Indian Hindi-language dance drama film written and directed by Remo D'Souza. Produced by Lizelle Remo D'Souza under Remo Dsouza Entertainment Pvt Ltd, the film stars Abhishek Bachchan, Inayat Verma, Nora Fatehi, and Nassar.

The film was released on 14 March 2025 on Amazon Prime Video.

== Cast ==
- Abhishek Bachchan as Shiv Rastogi
- Inayat Verma as Dhara Rastogi
- Nora Fatehi as Maggi
- Nassar as Nadar, Dhara's grandfather
- Johnny Lever as Gopi
- Sanchit Chanana as Prem
- Rupali Krishnan as Kusum
- Harleen Sethi as Rohini, Shiv's wife
- Prabhu Deva as himself in the song "Sultana"
- Vartika Jha as dancer in the song "Sultana"
- Jay Bhanushali, Punit Pathak, Salman Yusuff Khan, Elli AvrRam and Sonali Bendre make cameo appearances as themselves.

== Production ==
The film was announced by Amazon Prime Video. Abhishek Bachchan, Nora Fatehi, Nassar, Inayat Verma, Johnny Lever and Harleen Sethi were cast to appear in the film. Principal photography of the film commenced in April 2023 in Ooty before wrapping up in June 2023. The trailer of the film was released on 3 March 2025.

== Soundtrack ==
Be Happy

Soundtrack album by Harsh Upadhyay
- Released: 12 March 2025
- Genre: Feature film soundtrack
- Length: 45:31
- Language: Hindi
- Label: T-Series
External audio
- Audio Jukebox on YouTube

The music of the film is composed by Harsh Upadhyay with lyrics written by Pranav Vatsa.

Track listing
No.	Title	Lyrics	Singer(s)	Length
1.	"Sultana"	Sukriti Bhardwaj, Pranav Vatsa, Harsh Upadhyay	Sunidhi Chauhan, Nora Fatehi, Mika Singh	4:02
2.	"Raja"	Pranav Vatsa	Vishal Dadlani, Jatinder Singh	6:25
3.	"Devi Aayi"	Sukriti Bhardwaj, Pranav Vatsa, Harsh Upadhyay	Shankar Mahadevan	4:08
4.	"Mere Papa"	Pranav Vatsa, Harsh Upadhyay	Senjuti Das, Jatinder Singh	6:26
5.	"Superstar"	Sukriti Bhardwaj, Pranav Vatsa	Mika Singh	3:18
6.	"Mazza Hi Mazza"	Sukriti Bhardwaj, Pranav Vatsa, Harsh Upadhyay	Sukriti Bhardwaj	2:35
7.	"Praan Pita Ka"	Pranav Vatsa	Kailash Kher	4:54
8.	"Superstar (Kids Version)"	Sukriti Bhardwaj, Pranav Vatsa, Harsh Upadhyay	Palakshi Dixit, Pratyush Anand, Atharv Bakshi, Vishwaja Jadhav, Anshika Chonkar	3:18
9.	"Be Happy"	Pranav Vatsa, Harsh Upadhyay	Abhay Harpale	3:24
10.	"Dream"	Sukriti Bhardwaj, Harsh Upadhyay	Sukriti Bhardwaj	1:25
11.	"I Got The Moves"		Harsh Upadhyay	2:11
12.	"Sultana - Remix"	Sukriti Bhardwaj, Pranav Vatsa, Harsh Upadhyay	Sunidhi Chauhan, Nora Fatehi, Mika Singh	3:23
Total length:				45:31

== Release ==
The film was made available to stream on Amazon Prime Video on 14 March 2025.

== Reception ==
Be Happy received generally mixed reviews from critics.

On the review aggregator website Rotten Tomatoes, 50% of 10 critics' reviews are positive, with an average rating of 5.4/10.

For The Indian Express, Shubhra Gupta gave the film 1.5 stars out of 5 and commented that "Abhishek Bachchan, who did such a solid job being a dad-to-a-daughter in I Want To Talk, comes off more stolid in Be Happy, essentially because the plot is more in service to the dancing and the competing than to showing us the lives these characters live.". Sukanya Verma of Rediff.com gave the film 2.5 out of 5 and observed that "Ultimately, it is Abhishek's restraint that controls Be Happy's urges to go overboard even as Inayat's charms threaten to do its exact opposite". Tamma Moksha of The Hindu said that "In typical Remo D’Souza fashion, it is dance, dance performances, and a Ganesha dance number that seem to present the solution to the tribulations of life — while there is nothing wrong with the creative decision, it leaves the audience wanting more".

Rahul Desai of The Hollywood Reporter India said that "Remo D’Souza dad-daughter-dance triangle is a dull bubblegum movie." A critic from Bollywood Hungama gave 3 stars out of 5 and said that "On the whole, BE HAPPY works due to the performances of Abhishek A Bachchan and Inayat Verma and the strong emotional moments in the second half." Lachmi Deb Roy of Firstpost writes "Abishek Bhachchan and Inayat Verma’s impressive performance will steal your heart in an emotional yet flawed film. Watch the film for the beautiful choreography, the songs and the brilliant performances except for Nora Fatehi."

Hardika Gupta of NDTV gave 1.5 stars out of 5 and said that "The film's reliance on melodrama and a predictable formula detracts from its potential to offer a fresh perspective on the father-daughter dynamic or the pursuit of dreams." Dhaval Roy of The Times of India gave 3 stars out of 5 and said that "Be Happy is a wholesome, feel-good film perfect for family viewing. Be prepared to shed a few tears at the climax and experience a true "rainbow of emotions" as Dhara describes being on stage."
