= Taarzan: The Wonder Car =

2004 Indian film by Abbas–Mustan

- Theatrical release poster
- Directed by: Abbas–Mustan
- Written by: Lalit Mahajan; Sunny Mahajan
- Produced by: Gordhan Tanwani
- Starring: Vatsal Sheth; Ayesha Takia; Ajay Devgn; Farida Jalal; Amrish Puri; Sadashiv Amrapurkar; Gulshan Grover; Rajpal Yadav; Mukesh Tiwari; Sikandar Kharbanda; Shakti Kapoor
- Cinematography: Ravi Yadav
- Edited by: Hussain A. Burmawala
- Music by: Songs: Himesh Reshammiya; Background Score: Surinder Sodhi
- Production company: Baba Films
- Distributed by: Baba Films; Zee Films
- Release date: 6 August 2004 (India)
- Running time: 162 minutes
- Country: India
- Language: Hindi
- Budget: ₹14 crore
- Box office: ₹6.2 crore

Taarzan: The Wonder Car, or simply called Taarzan, is a 2004 Indian Hindi-language supernatural action thriller film directed by Abbas–Mustan. The film stars Vatsal Sheth, Ayesha Takia, and Ajay Devgn, while Farida Jalal, Pankaj Dheer, Sadashiv Amrapurkar, Amrish Puri, Shakti Kapoor, Gulshan Grover and Mukesh Tiwari play supporting roles. It is loosely based on Marathi film Ek Gadi Baki Anadi (1988) which was inspired by the American film Christine (1983) which was itself based on Stephen King novel Christine. This also marked the debut of Ayesha Takia, for which she won the Filmfare Best Debut Award.

== Plot ==
Automobile engineer Deven Chaudhary, who lives with his mother Suhasini and ten-year-old son Raj, builds a futuristic car with advanced features. He names this design DC.

He also owns and maintains an older Morris Minor car that was handed down to him by his late father that he calls "Taarzan," based on the car's mirror ornament that resembles the fictional character Tarzan. Deven meets with FourFox, a private company, to discuss his design. FourFox executive Rakesh Kapoor and his partners Kailash Chopra, Anthony D'Costa, and Mahesh Saxena praise the design but disagree over royalties. However, they steal the design and register it under their own name. This infuriates Deven, and he files a complaint with the police. Unfortunately, the police inspector Sanjay Sharma, who takes his case, is secretly on Rakesh's payroll. He, along with Rakesh and his cronies, attacks Deven, gags him, and locks him in his car. They then push the car into a lake, causing Deven's death, with his family never knowing what happened to him.

Twelve years later, Raj, now a 22-year-old young man, attends college, where he falls in love with Priya, a rich girl. Raj also works as a part-time mechanic at a garage owned by Kartar Singh. One day, he discovers his father's old car, Taarzan, in a scrapyard. He pools money demanded by the owner of the scrapyard and buys it for ₹5000.

Raj works with Kartar Singh to repair and upgrade the car in memory of his father. They revamp the car into a more advanced version than Deven's original design, and Raj decides to rename it DC to honour his father's memory. However, the car would not start due to a damaged fuel pump, and it does not seem reparable, depressing Raj.

One night however, Deven's spirit powers the car, making it run miraculously. Raj, Priya, Suhasini, and Karter celebrate. While taking Priya and Suahsini out, he grabs his rival classmates, Rocky and his goon's attention who pick a fight with him. Deven's spirit witnesses this and decides to drive the car later that night and go after the boys. Eventually, he injures them which makes them apologise to Raj, who they think is driving the car. The next day, Rocky and his friends approach Raj and apologise once again and beg for mercy, which confuses Raj. However, he accepts their apology, and they all become friends.

When Raj leaves his car unattended, Deven takes control of it to seek revenge on his murderers. When Rakesh is abroad, Deven's spirit uses the car to kill Kailash, Anthony, Mahesh, and Sanjay. His power and control of the car also made it so he can miraculously repair itself as if nothing happened, making Raj unaware of the activities. Since the car belongs to Raj, he becomes a suspect in the eyes of Inspector Khurana, the investigating officer. Khurana takes Raj in for questioning when Mahesh's widow was allegedly attacked by DC/Taarzan without the "driver" exiting the vehicle. (Deven blew his horn heavily which caused a sound shockwave, destroying Mahesh's property.) However, Raj is released as Priya was his alibi along with his class rivals-turned-friends all present with him at a nightclub during the night in question. When Rakesh returns to India, he learns all his partners' fate.

Rakesh is revealed to be Priya's father and meets Raj on her insistence. After learning Raj is Deven's son and with the deaths of his partners, Rakesh assumes that Raj has discovered the truth and is using Priya as a pawn and he's next. Deven, meanwhile, tries to pursue Rakesh. Rakesh, however, believing it is Raj after him decides to try and kill Raj before he kills him. During the chase, Taarzan gets destroyed, which is witnessed by Raj and his grandmother, them suspecting how the car moved on its own. With Priya witnessing her father's actions, Rakesh attacks Suhasini, knocking her out, then attacks and kidnaps Raj. Still believing Raj was after him, Rakesh reveals the truth about Deven's death, horrifying Raj. Rakesh tries to drown Raj, however, Deven's spirit magically repairs the car in front of his mother, revealing himself to her before driving in the water and saving Raj. Deven then reveals himself as a ghost to Raj and Rakesh. Terrified upon seeing Deven's spirit and learning it was him that killed his partners, Rakesh confesses his crime before everyone, which Inspector Khurana also witnesses, fully clearing Raj's name.

Khurana arrests Rakesh. Everyone watches as Deven says his last goodbye to Suhasini and Raj. With Raj, Suhasini, and Priya united, Deven's spirit becomes free, and he ascends to heaven.

== Cast ==
- Vatsal Sheth as Raj Choudhary, Deven's son and Priya's boyfriend.
- Ayesha Takia as Priya Kapoor, Raj's girlfriend and Rakesh's daughter.
- Ajay Devgan as Deven Choudhary, Suhasini's son, Raj's father. (guest appearance)
- Farida Jalal as Suhasini Choudhary (Dadi), Deven's mother, Raj's grandmother.
- Sumeet Pathak as Vikram "Vicky" Jain, Raj's best friend.
- Amrish Puri as Kartar Singh (Paaji): Raj's boss.
- Pankaj Dheer as Rakesh Kapoor, 1st partner, Priya's father and Deven's murderer.
- Mukesh Tiwari as Kailash Chopra,2nd partner, Deven's murderer.
- Sadashiv Amrapurkar as Anthony D'Costa Jojo's father, 3rd partner, Deven's murderer.
- Shakti Kapoor as Mahesh Saxena, 4th partner, Deven's murderer.
- Sheela Sharma as Mrs. Chopra, Kailash's wife.
- Gulshan Grover as Police Inspector S. Khurana.
- Rajpal Yadav as Police Constable Havaldar Sitaram.
- Deepak Shirke as Inspector Sanjay Sharma, Deven's murderer.
- Jeetu Verma as Jojo D'Costa
- Sikandar Kharbanda as Rocky, Raj's bully-turned-friend.
- Narendra Bedi as Truck Driver Satpal
- Amrit Patel as Scrapeyard Satnam
- Sharad Sankla as Police Constable Arun

== Soundtrack ==
Taarzan: The Wonder Car

Soundtrack album by Himesh Reshammiya
- Released: 6 August 2004 (Film)
- Recorded: 2004
- Venue: Mumbai
- Studio: HR Muzic
- Genre: Feature Film soundtrack
- Length: 39:31
- Label: Sangeet Music
- Producer: Himesh Reshammiya

Himesh Reshammiya chronology
Julie (2004)	Taarzan: The Wonder Car (2004)	Dil Ne Jise Apna Kahaa (2004)

The music is composed by Himesh Reshammiya with lyrics by Sameer.

#	Title	Singer(s)	Length
1	"Chura Lo"	Shaan, Alka Yagnik	4:29
2	"Gonna Fall In Love"	Kunal Ganjawala, Alka Yagnik	4:36
3	"O Lala Re"	KK, Alka Yagnik	5:16
4	"O Sajan"	Udit Narayan, Alka Yagnik	6:44
5	"Taarzan"	Kumar Sanu, Jayesh Gandhi	6:02
6	"Chura Lo Dil Mera"	Udit Narayan, Alka Yagnik	4:29

== Critical response ==
Taran Adarsh of IndiaFM gave the film 2.5 stars out of 5, writing, ″On the whole, TAARZAN THE WONDER CAR is a different experience that will find its share of supporters and adversaries. At the box-office, the film will have to rely on kid-power to make it big. Had the film released during vacations, the outcome would've been much better. Dhawan G of Rediff.com wrote, ″The Abbas-Mustan film will actually delight kids more than adults. It's funny, Hollywood's king of horror Stephen King would never have seen his horror fest Christine becoming a family film, where the car—instead of scaring the audience—entertains them.″ Goher Iqbal Punn of BBC.com wrote, ″On the whole, Tarzan - The Wonder Car is a stylishly and creatively executed enterprise, which will have you glued to your seat till the end. A great entertainer overall.″
