= Gehraiyaan (TV series) =

Horror web series

- Genre: Horror
- Created by: Vikram Bhatt
- Directed by: Sidhant Sachdev
- Starring: Sanjeeda Sheikh
- Theme music composer: Harish Sagane
- Ending theme: Gehraiyaan Title Song
- Composer: Harish Sagane
- Country of origin: India
- Original languages: Hindi; English
- No. of episodes: 10

Production
- Production location: Mumbai
- Camera setup: Multi-Camara
- Running time: 20 minutes approx
- Production company: VB On The Web

Original release
- Network: Viu
- Release: 12 April – 14 June 2017

Gehraiyaan is a horror web series created by Vikram Bhatt, starring Sanjeeda Sheikh, Vatsal Sheth in lead role. It is directed by Sidhant Sachdev. It is a love story that unfolds between a 26-year-old researcher Reyna Kapoor, at a Mumbai hospital, and her surgeon friend Shekhar, amidst mysterious and dark occurrences in her house.

== Plot ==
The story begins with construction workers trying to uproot a tree, which causes a dead body to hang out of the tree. Postmortem reveals the body to be at least a year old and hence in very bad shape and it can't be identified. It is taken to a hospital. At night, the dead body opens its eyes, causing all lights in the hospital to explode.

The story moves on to Reyna Kapoor (Sanjeeda Sheikh), who used to be an excellent surgeon ( according to her, surgery is her first love). An incident that happened in her life had caused her to get PTSD and hence she is unable to do surgeries.

At the beginning of the series, she has recovered and is planning to take a test to confirm that she is ready to go back to surgery. But as she begins to take the test, a power outage occurs, with the lights exploding. The test is rescheduled for another week.

Reyna meets with her friend Dr. Shekhar (Trishaan Singh Maini), who is shown to have the interest to pursue a relationship with her. When Reyna returns to her apartment, she experiences paranormal activity in the lift, scaring her. This occurs multiple days, with a ghost-like entity appearing and scaring her at times.

She shares it with her friends Dr. Shekhar and Dr. Meghna who don't believe her and instead convinced her that she is hallucinating as a result of the high dosage medication she takes for her PTSD.

Reyna meets a man Sahil Arora (Vatsal Seth) in the lift, who befriends her. He invites her to his home for coffee, where it is shown to the viewers that he keeps dead bodies in his fridge and drinks blood.

Meanwhile, the haunting incidents surrounding Reyna increase and as no one believes her, she argues with her friends and asks them to stay away, which upsets them. Dr. Shekhar discusses this with Dr. Shetty who advises him to pretend as if he has believed Reyna, as it might help her cope better.

So, Dr. Shekhar brings in a psychic Mukherjee (whom he had bribed to tell Reyna that there is nothing wrong with her or her house). Mukherjee sees the ghost, but on cue from Shekhar, tells Reyna that nothing was wrong, which relaxes her. Later, Mukherjee texts Shekhar about the presence of an entity in Reyna's home, which Shekhar ignores and warns Mukherjee to be quiet.

Reyna asks Shekhar out on a dinner date and reveals that she is finally ready to commit. Before she could propose to Shekhar, she goes to the washroom to prepare herself, where she receives a call from the ghost (shown to be Sahil) who warns her not to believe Shekhar. He also asks her to check Shekhar's phone, which scares her. Then she goes to meet with Shekhar and checks his phone about conversation him and Mr. Mukherjee when he is called away on an issue about his car. She finds out that he hid the truth from her. Then she goes to her apartment where she meets Sahil and Sahil informs her that there is a spirit in her house and tells her that for her safety, she needs to stay away from that house. This way they can find out if there's a problem with her or the apartment. So she moves into a hotel room. In other side, Shekhar tries to call her but she won't pick up the call. Then Shekhar informed Dr. Meghna about what happened and asked her to call Dr. Reyna. Dr. Reyna receives a call from Dr. Meghna asking her where she is. In the hotel room, she reveals the truth about how Shekhar bribed Mr. Mukherjee to lie about the spirit's presence. That night, Dr. Meghna also sees the spirit and finally believes her friend. Sahil then pretends to help Reyna and along with Dr. Meghna they perform Seance a way to communicate with spirits. During the Seance Sahil gets injured. When Dr. Meghna treats his wounds she notices that there is no blood or DNA in the glasses she took out from his wounds. She becomes suspicious and contacts Mr. Mukharjee. Mr. Mukherjee tells her that Sahil's body is being used by an evil spirit. He tells her to warn Reyna. But the evil spirit kills Dr. Meghna before that. Reyna after the death of her best friend gets exhausted and Sahil trying to pacify her ultimately ends up sleeping together. Before that Reyna tells Sahil about the incident that caused the PTSD. One-night man comes carrying his pregnant wife and shouting for help in the hospital where she worked in Bengulru. Reyna attends the case and the man ask her to get his wife and child back with health while his wife asks Reyna to let her die as she wants freedom from her husband. After completing the sentence she dies. A nurse informs this to the man and out of anger and madness he threatens to kill Reyna. In a stunt, the security guards shoot him to save Reyna after which Reyna faints. The next day Reyna goes to Sahil's flat and from the security guard there she finds out that the flat was not in use for some time now, which shocks her. Now Shekar also started believing her with learning the fact that Sahil was dead a month ago and his body went missing and the duo finds out that it was actually the spirit using Sahil's body. They meet Sahil's wife Avni and learn about the accident. Reyna tells Shekhar that they should go to Mr. Mukherjee for help. Shekhar then informs her that Mr. Mukherjee is dead. During this conversation, they were attacked by the spirit. After that, they go to the hospital where a lady, Roshni comes to help Reyna. They soon find out that Reyna is pregnant with 3 weeks old baby which shocks them with the fact that it has been only less than a week since she met Sahil. This news actually makes Shekar devastated and he suddenly takes a leave. The duo, Roshini and Reyna go to the horror house where the man and his wife used to live. There Reyna gets an ultimatum that the baby will kill her and she has time only till its birth. She comes back and finds Shekar waiting outside her flat. The duo patches up. Roshini, Reyna, and Shekar together decide to set up an operation theater in the church but was unable to do because the spirit kills the nurse and the attenders accompanying them. The opt for the alternative, the pooja. They perform it and in between the doll goes missing and after a fight with the spirit of the man they are able to burn the doll. Roshini falls through the window after the doll is burned. Sometime later Reyna opens her eyes and feels sad that for her Roshini died. Shekar tells her that someone wants to meet them . The duo goes to meet Roshini's husband who reveals to them that Roshni was dead some days ago and her body went missing and sometimes early he got a call from the hospital that his wife's body is there and so he was able to do her last rites. The story ends with Reyna returning to normal life.

== Cast ==
- Sanjeeda Sheikh as Reyna Kapoor
- Vatsal Sheth as Sahil Arora
- Trishaan Singh Maini as Shekhar
- Shruti Srivastava as Roshni
- Meherzan Mazda as Surya
- Vidur Anand as Dr. Kashyap
- Rishina Kandhari Dr. Shetty
- Rrahul Sudhir as Mr.Mukherjee
- Radhika bangia as Dr.Meghna
- Kajal Pisal as Avni

== Production ==
The first look posters featuring Sanjeeda Sheikh and trailer of Gehraiyaan were released on 19 March 2017.
