= Aamir Ali =

Indian television actor

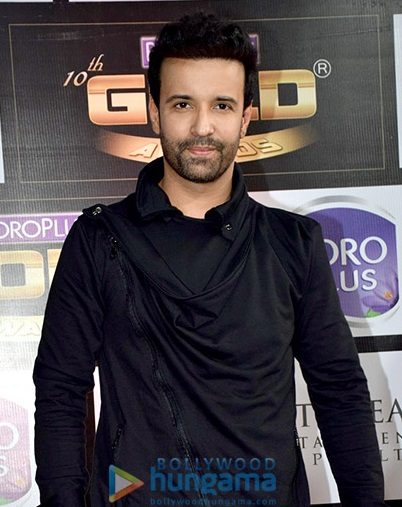
- Ali at the Zee Gold Awards, 2017
- Born: Aamir Ali Malik; 1 September 1981 (age 45); Mumbai, Maharashtra, India
- Education: Mumbai University
- Occupations: Actor; model
- Years active: 2002–present
- Spouse: Sanjeeda Sheikh (m. 2012; div. 2021)
- Children: 1

Aamir Ali Malik (born 1 September 1981), known as Aamir Ali, is an Indian actor and model.

== Career and personal life ==
Ali's first commercial break was a commercial for Bajaj Scooters. He appeared in advertising campaigns for Bajaj Bravo Scooter, Aptech Computers, Maruti Zen, Ponds talc, Nescafe, Mahindra Rodeo, Chevrolet, BSNL, Videocon D2H, State Bank of India and others. He played cameo roles in the movies I Hate Luv Storys, Raakh, Anjaan, and Yeh Kya Ho Raha Hai and appeared in music videos for Anuradha Paudwal - Ishq Hua and Mangal Singh - Koka Koka.

Ali appeared in Kahaani Ghar Ghar Kii playing the role Sameer Kaul. Later he joined channel Sahara One's Woh Rehne Waali Mehlon Ki to play the role of Saumya Parashar. He played a lead in Kya Dill Mein Hai. He participated in Nach Baliye 3 with Sanjeeda Sheikh and on 22 December 2007 their pair won the Nach Baliye 3 championship against Rakhi Sawant and Abhishek Avasthi. Ali did a cameo in Sony TV's Kuchh Is Tara. He also worked in Bhaskar Bharti where he played the lead role Armaan which premiered on 25 May 2009 and concluded on 17 December 2009. He was also seen in Zara Nachke Dikha 2 from 1 May to 10 July 2010. In F.I.R., he played the character of Inspector Bajrang Pandey. He played the role of Saumya Chauhan in Sahara One's Jhilmil Sitaaron Ka Aangan Hoga, ended in October 2013. He was later seen in a cameo as Neil in the thriller series Ek Hasina Thi. He played the role of Dylan Singh Shekhawat in Dilli Wali Thakur Gurls, a show which aired on the And TV from March 2015 to October 2015. He also participated in Sony TV's reality show Power Couple with wife Sanjeeda Sheikh and later appeared in the show Sarojini as Rishabh on Zee TV.

He was married to television actress Sanjeeda Sheikh until they divorced in 2021. In August 2020, it was revealed that the couple has a one-year old daughter, Ayra Ali, through surrogacy.

Ali appeared in music video 'Tanha Hoon' sung by Yasser Desai.

== Filmography ==
=== Films ===
Key
†	Denotes films that have not yet been released

Year	Film	Role	Note(s)
2002	Yeh Kya Ho Raha Hai?	Rahul	
2004	Khamosh Pani	Saleem Khan	
2006	Anjaan		Cameo appearance
2007	Raakh: A Poem Masked in Blood	Krish	
2010	I Hate Luv Storys	Rajiv/ Rahul	
2022	Faraaz	Mr. Sen	

=== Television ===
Year	Serial	Role
2005	Sarabhai vs Sarabhai	Patang Mahajan
2005–2006	Kahaani Ghar Ghar Kii	Sameer Kaul
2006	Ishq Ki Ghanti	Himself
2006–2007	Woh Rehne Waali Mehlon Ki	Saumya Parashar
2007	Nach Baliye 3	Contestant (Winner)
2007–2008	Kya Dill Mein Hai	Rahul Punj / Anurag
2008	Kuchh Is Tara	Guru
2008	Kaho Na Yaar Hai	Contestant
2008	Bura Na Mano Holi Hai	Contestant
2008	Kis Desh Mein Hai Meraa Dil	Meet
2008	Nach Baliye 4	Host
2009	Bhaskar Bharti	Armaan Sinha
2010	Zara Nachke Dikha	Contestant
2010	Nachle Ve with Saroj Khan	Guest
2011	Entertainment Ke Liye Kuch Bhi Karega	Himself
2011–2015	F.I.R.	Chief Inspector Bajrang Pandey
2012–2013	Hongey Judaa Na Hum	Dr. Aniruddh Sharma
2013	Jhilmil Sitaaron Ka Aangan Hoga	Saumya Chauhan
2014	Ek Hasina Thi	Dr. Neil Bhattacharya
2014	Box Cricket League	Guest
2015	Dilli Wali Thakur Gurls	Dylan Singh Shekhawat
2015	Tashan-E-Ishq	Himself
2015–2016	Power Couple	Contestant (4th Place)
2016	Sarojini - Ek Nayi Pehal	Rishabh
2019	Navrangi Re!	Vishwas
2020	Black Widows	Eddie
2020	Naxalbari	Keswani
2023	The Trial	Pradeep Shinde
2023	Jhalak Dikhhla Jaa	Contestant (12th Place)
2024	Lootere	Ghulam Waris
2024	Doctors	Dr. Dhaval Vasu
2026	Amar Vishwas	Akbar Baig
