= Badalte Rishton Ki Dastaan =

2013 Indian television drama series

- Genre: Drama
- Written by: Mitali Bhattacharya; Zama Habib; Shipra Arora; Tanuja Chaturvedi
- Directed by: Rakesh Kumar
- Creative director: Saket Kumar
- Starring: See below
- Country of origin: India
- Original language: Hindi
- No. of seasons: 1
- No. of episodes: 74

Production
- Executive producers: Puneet Singh & Anand Jain
- Producers: Mitali Bhattacharya & Ravi Ojha
- Production locations: New Delhi and Dharamshala
- Editor: Janak Chauhan
- Camera setup: Multi-camera
- Running time: Approx. 24 minutes
- Production company: Ravi Ojha Productions

Original release
- Network: Zee TV
- Release: 18 March – 28 June 2013

Badalte Rishton Ki Dastaan is an Indian television drama series which premiered on 18 March 2013 on Zee TV. The series is a Hindi version of Zee Bangla's show Khela and is produced by Ravi Ojha. The show was first aired on 18 March 2013.

== Overview ==
Badalte Rishton Ki Dastaan translates to "a tale of fickle relationships". It is the story of relationships and the fight against patriarchal society. The majority of the series occurs within the spacious Asthana family home. Balraj Asthana, as the patriarch of the family, believes he can control the behavior of those in the house. However, each member of the family carries several secrets that they hide from each other.

Balraj's elder brother, Kailash, died mysteriously years earlier. His widow, Aloka, and their three children live in the house: Akhil, Agasthya, and Deepika. Akhil is a dutiful officer of the law, whose wife Shyama also carries secrets. Together they have a daughter, Rimi.

Balraj, as well, is presented as a widower. He has three living children. The three daughters are Pallavi, Nupur, and Anuja. Pallavi defied her father's wishes and married a writer named Niranjan. He often seems to have a soft heart and soft mind, but a deep and clever character lies beneath.

Aniruddh Asthana married Nandini, whose father formerly owned the house in which the Asthana family now lives. Balraj deeply loved his son, but was infuriated that the marriage had not yet produced any children.

Holding the house together is Beeji. She was taken in by the Asthana family when Balraj and Kailash were still children, and promised their family that she would take care of them. When Balraj's wife Uma never returned from hospital, Beeji raised the children as her own.

The family is thrown into mourning when Ani suddenly dies in a tragic car accident. Shortly thereafter, his lover Meera arrives at the Asthana house, unaware that Ani was married.

When Balraj discovers that Meera is pregnant with Ani's child, he concocts a scheme to ensure that an heir is produced to inherit Balraj's estate. As the series progresses, it is revealed that Meera's family is intertwined with the Asthanas in ways that could reveal Balraj's deepest secrets.

== Cast ==
- Sanjeeda Sheikh as Meera Khandpal; Anuridh's lover and his child's mother.
- Additi Gupta as Nandini Tiwari/Asthana/Kashyap; Anirudh's wife.
- Bhaumik Sampat as Dr. Neel
- Kiran Karmarkar as Balraj Asthana; Anuridh's father.
- Abhinav Shukla as Aniruddh Balraj Asthana; Nandini's husband and Meera's lover.
- Tanushree Kaushal as Aloka Kailash Asthana/Taiji/Ammaji
- Namrata Thapa as Pallavi
- Richa Soni as Shyama Akhil Asthana/Bijli
- Mona Ambegaonkar as Beeji; Anuridh's mother.
- Chaitanya Choudhury as Akhil Asthana; Anirudddh's step-brother and Agastya's elder brother.
- Abhaas Mehta as Agastya Asthana; Anuruddh's step brother and Akhil's younger brother.
- Rishi Khurana as Niranjan
- Shalu Shreya as Anuja
- Ragini Khanna as Ragini
