= Dhhai Kilo Prem =

Indian Television Series

- Genre: Soap opera
- Created by: Ekta Kapoor; Shobha Kapoor
- Written by: Muhammad Haris Siddiqui
- Directed by: Neeraj Baliyan
- Creative director: Sandiip Sikcand Creative Team- Tanya Mukherjee
- Starring: Meherzan Mazda Anjali Anand
- Opening theme: "Dhhai Kilo Prem" by Pamela Jain & "Rang De" by Tulsi Kumar
- Country of origin: India
- Original language: Hindi
- No. of seasons: 2
- No. of episodes: 156

Production
- Producers: Ekta Kapoor; Shobha Kapoor
- Editor: Sameer Gandhi
- Camera setup: Multi-camera
- Production company: Balaji Telefilms

Original release
- Network: StarPlus
- Release: 3 April – 30 September 2017

Dhhai Kilo Prem (English: Two-and-a half Kilos of Love) is an Indian Hindi-language television series, which began airing from 3 April 2017 on StarPlus. The series is produced by Balaji Telefilms of Ekta Kapoor and Shobha Kapoor. The series aired from Mondays - Saturdays during the Star Dopahar (afternoon) programming block. The series ended on 30 September 2017 when the afternoon programming block was discontinued.

== Plot ==
The story follows the journey of two overweighted individuals Piyush and Dipika. Despite both getting married, Piyush dislikes Dipika. Finally after many circumstances, they fall in love.

== Cast ==
=== Main cast ===
- Meherzan Mazda as Piyush Sharma: Dipika's husband; Pankaj and Madhuri's son
- Anjali Anand as Dipika Sharma: Piyush's Wife; Dev and Ragini's daughter

=== Recurring cast ===
- Alice Kaushik as Meghna Rahul Mishra: Piyush's sister, Rahul's wife
- Kiran Karmarkar as Pankaj Sharma: Piyush's father
- Manasi Joshi Roy as Madhuri Sharma: Piyush's mother
- Geeta Nair as Rukmani: Dipika's Aunty, Meghna's Mother inlaw
- Rahul Sharma as Rahul Mishra: Dipika's cousin, Meghna's husband
- Vikram Pratap as Kishor
- Rajendra Chawla as Dev Mishra : Dipika's father
- Ritu Vij as Ragini Mishra: Dipika's mother
- Himanshu Arora as Darshan Mishra : Dipika's Brother
- Aly Goni as Sushant
- Shireen Mirza as Rashmi
- Nandini Gupta as Namrata: Piyush's sister
- Udit Shukla as Inspector Kunal: Namrata's husband
- Pravisht Mishra as Tushar: Piyush's brother
- Benazir Shaikh as Sarika: Dipika's Best Friend
- Suraj Kakkar as Rishi: Sarika's lover
- Rohan Gandotra as Aman
- Kishwer Merchant as Shilpa

== Production ==
Male lead Meherzan Mazda speaking about his transformation for his role from 80 to 102 kg, he said, "I had to go through special physical training to match the body type for my character. The script demanded me to get into a very weird shape. Along with muscular training in the gym, I went on a guilt-free indulgence diet. I was on a strict diet to gain weight. I had to put on 16 kilos in two months and I am glad that I have managed to do it." Female lead Anjali Anand transformed from 72 to 108 kg for her role. However, she was asked to gain more weight than this but she refused. After auditioning over 900 people, Anjali Anand was cast as Deepika.

== Reception ==
The Times of India stated, "Set in Agra, the feel of the show is quite retro. Dialogues of the show, look forced and deliberate, only meant to create an effect. Focusing solely on how obesity comes as a hurdle in the way of finding a match, the content focuses on a single issue, and does not deal fairly with all the problems related to obesity. Even though Anjali and Meherzan do justice to their roles, it is the weak plot that kills the tale."
