= Dhruv Choudhry =

Indian television actor

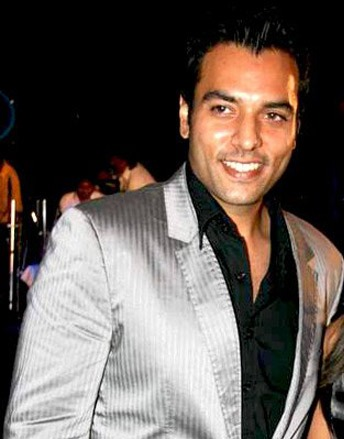
- Born: Chaitannya Choudhry; 18 April; Mumbai, India
- Occupation: Actor
- Years active: 2004–present
- Known for: Aahat
- Spouse: Vaishali Rajpal Choudhry

Dhruv Choudhry (born 18 April; formerly Chaitannya Choudhry) is an Indian Indian television and film actor. He has appeared in several Hindi-language television series and films, and gained recognition for roles including Harsh in Aahat, Kanha Chatterjee in Uttaran, and Shardul Sinha in Star Plus's Yeh Hai Mohabbatein.

== Early life ==
Choudhry was born in Mumbai, India, on 18 April. Under his birth name Chaitannya Choudhry, he began his acting career in the mid-2000s.

== Personal life ==
In 2025, he announced on Instagram that he had changed his name to Dhruv Choudhry.

== Filmography ==
Year	Film	Role
2003	Love at Times Square	Bobby
2016	Akira	Ajay Sharma
2023	Sukhee	Guru Kalra
2025	Sikandar	

== Television ==
Year	Show	Role	Ref
2004–2006	Kahiin To Hoga	Akshat Shergill	
2005	Kyunki Saas Bhi Kabhi Bahu Thi	Kabir Patel	
2005–2006	Kkavyanjali	Vayu Kapoor	
2006; 2014	C.I.D.	Arvind	Episode 424, "The Mysterious Mr. Arvind"
2006; 2014	C.I.D.	Chintu	Episodes 1059 and 1060, "Bus Hijack: Part 1 & Part 2"
2006–2007	Kuch Apne Kuch Paraye	Uday Raichand	
2007–2009	Sangam	Sagar Bhatia	
2009–2010	Aahat	Harsh	Lead role
2010	Sarvggun Sampanna	Aditya Deshmukh	
2011	Mann Kee Awaaz Pratigya	Abhishek	
2012	Haunted Nights	Rahul (Episode 1 – Episode 5)	
2012–2014	Uttaran	Kanha Chatterjee	
2013	Badalte Rishton Ki Dastaan	Akhil Asthana	
2014	Gustakh Dil		
2014	Do Dil Bandhe Ek Dori Se	Veerpratap Singh	
2014	Savdhaan India	Captain Vikram	Episode 804
2015	Ek Veer Ki Ardaas...Veera	Professor Rahul	
2015	Dream Girl	Abhimanyu	
2017–2019	Paramavatar Shri Krishna	Vasudeva	
2018–2019	Dil Hi Toh Hai	Rishabh	
2019	Yeh Hai Mohabbatein	Shardul Sinha	Lead negative role
2022	Swaraj	Kanhoji Angre	

== Reality shows ==
Year	Show	Role
2008	Kaho Na Yaar Hai	Contestant
2008	Zara Nachke Dikha	Contestant
2014–2015	Box Cricket League	Contestant

== Web series ==
Year	Show	Role
2022	Hush Hush	Ranveer
2026	Shaque: Trust No One	Gaurav
