= Love at Times Square =

2003 Indian film by Dev Anand

- Poster
- Directed by: Dev Anand
- Written by: Dev Anand
- Produced by: Dev Anand
- Starring: Dev Anand; Shoib Khan; Heene Kaushik; Chaitanya Choudhury; Satish Shah; Ketki Dave; Ashish Vidyarthi; Vikram Gokhale
- Music by: Songs: Rajesh Roshan; Lucky Ali; Adnan Sami; Aadesh Shrivastava; Background Score: Bappi Lahiri
- Distributed by: T-Series
- Release date: 14 February 2003
- Country: India
- Language: Hindi
- Budget: ₹2.50 crore
- Box office: ₹29.88 lakh

Love at Times Square is a 2003 Indian film directed by Dev Anand starring Himself, Shoib Khan, Chaitanya Chaudhary, and Heene Kaushik. The film had special appearances by Salman Khan and Rishi Kapoor.

== Plot ==
Sweety is the daughter of a billionaire Indian Shaan. The girl's father organizes a musical concert at Times Square, where she comes across two young boys: Raj and Bobby. Raj is a computer engineer and works in Silicon Valley, whereas Bobby has come to the US in order to earn a bright future. Sweety is pursuing her studies in mass communication in the US. Both the boys fall in love with the same girl.

Sweety drives from New York City to San Jose with Raj to meet her father, and on the way, Raj falls in love with her. Meanwhile, Bobby starts working under her father and also falls in love with Sweety. Both men propose marriage to her, but Sweety declines, unsure about love.

Eventually, she falls in love with Bobby after he saves her from the antagonist. On New Year's Eve, one year after their initial meeting, Sweety chooses Bobby, and the two get engaged.

== Cast ==
- Dev Anand as Shaan Khanna
- Heenee Kaushik as Sweety Khanna
- Moon Moon Sen as Sweety's mother
- Shoib Khan as Raj Scindia
- Harish Patel as Natvar
- Chaitanya Choudhury as Bobby Grewal
- Ananth Mahadevan as Guru Swamy
- Satish Shah as Gujrat Motel Owner
- Ketki Dave as Gujarat Motel Owner’s wife
- Tom Alter as Mr. Gery
- Dalip Tahil as Uncle of Bobby
- Vikram Gokhale as Father of Raj
- Ashish Vidyarthi as Hashmi 'Bullet'
- Rishi Kapoor as Satellite Channel CEO (Special appearance)
- Salman Khan in the song "Aaja Aaja" (Special appearance)

== Music ==
Lyrics were written by Javed Akhtar and Nasir Faraaz, music was composed by Lucky Ali, Rajesh Roshan, Adnan Sami and Aadesh Shrivastava.

Lucky Ali and Adnan Sami also gave his voice for the songs.

1. "Aaja Aaja" - Adnan Sami
2. "Aisa Ho Koi" - Kavita Krishnamurthy
3. "Raat Hai Jawan (Aaja Aaja Sad Version)" - Adnan Sami
4. "Sapna Ho" - Sonu Nigam, Vijeta Pandit
5. "Sote Sote" - Lucky Ali, Sapna Mukherjee
6. "Woh Ladka Aisa Hoga" - Udit Narayan, Abhijeet, Jaspinder Narula
7. "Yahan Pyar Me Dhadke Dil" - Alka Yagnik (composed by Rajesh Roshan)
8. "Ye Raste Yeh Masti" - Kavita Krishnamurthy, Lucky Ali

== Reception ==
Metacritic, which uses a weighted average, assigned the film a score of 39 out of 100, based on 5 critics, indicating "generally unfavorable" reviews.

In India, Sify criticized for poor writing and plot as well as poor acting by the newcomers. The direction of scenes in New York and transitions between scenes were also criticized. Taran Adarsh of IndiaFM gave the film one out of five, writing, ″Even the September 11 incident has no relevance to the story and has been forced to the screenplay. The climax is also an absolute letdown. Dev Anand's direction is below the mark. Though the idea of depicting a love story on a New Year eve is different, the execution leaves a lot to be desired.″

In US, Dave Kehr of The New York Times wrote that "The good cheer of Love at Times Square is relentless, and given the film's 155-minute running time, occasionally oppressive". Mark Holcomb of The Village Voice wrote, ″It takes an abundance of nerve or an impressive miscalculation of vision to situate the guileless, frenzied glitz of a Bollywood musical in gloomy NYC. Both seem to motivate octogenarian Indian auteur Dev Anand's Love at Times Square, which mixes bourgeois moralizing with chaste rom-com shenanigans and song-and-dance numbers that would make the Solid Gold dancers weep with envy. Anand plays a self-described "compassionate Silicon Valley billionaire" whose daughter, Sweety, contends with dual suitors in pseudo-swank Manhattan (or a Calcutta soundstage facsimile thereof). When the pressure mounts, she pops over to Dad's spray-paint-and-pasteboard San Jose mansion—which appears to be about a day's drive from midtown—to belt out a tune or two. Anand manages to work in shamelessly exploitative September 11 footage between numbers, but aside from this sequence, Love couldn't be more giddily benign.″ Megan Lehmann of the New York Post gave the film 1.5 out of 4, writing, ″This blithe inattention to authenticity is perversely endearing, and the whole (overlong) shebang is so jolly and well-intentioned, that it's kind of fun. It's just not very good film-making.″
