= Broken But Beautiful =

2018 Hindi romantic web series created by Ekta Kapoor

- Genre: Web series; Romance
- Created by: Ekta Kapoor
- Developed by: Ekta Kapoor
- Written by: Reshu Nath; (seasons 1&2); Rajat Arora; (season 3)
- Directed by: Santosh Singh; (season 1); Harsh Dedhia; (season 2); Priyanka Ghose; (season 3)
- Creative directors: Sanjay Kumar Daryani; Bhavna Rawail; Baljit Singh Chaddha; Aakaash Berry; Insiya Burmawala; Rohit Mondal
- Starring: see below
- Music by: see below
- Opening theme: Ye Kya Hua
- Country of origin: India
- Original languages: Hindi; English
- No. of seasons: 3
- No. of episodes: 31 (list of episodes)

Production
- Executive producer: Yukti Anand
- Producers: Sarita A Tanwar; (seasons 1, 2 & 3); Muraj Khetani; (seasons 1 & 2); Ashwin Varde; (seasons 1 & 2); Niraj Kishore Kothari; (seasons 1, 2 & 3)
- Cinematography: Jitan Harmeet Singh; Anik Ram Verma
- Editors: Unnikrishnan Payoor Parameshwaran; Honey Thakur; Kamlesh Parui
- Camera setup: Multi-camera
- Running time: 18-34 minutes
- Production companies: Roaring River Productions; Cine 1 Studios; Inglorious Films; (seasons 1 & 2); 11:11 productions; (season 3)

Original release
- Network: ALTBalaji; MX Player; ZEE5
- Release: November 27, 2018 – May 29, 2021

Broken But Beautiful, abbreviated as BBB is a 2018 Hindi romance web series, created by Ekta Kapoor, and available on video on demand platforms and ALTBalaji/MX Player. The series revolves around love, heartbreaks and never ending romance between two individuals. First two seasons are about the story of Veer and Sameera played by Vikrant Massey and Harleen Sethi respectively. The third season introduces a new story of Agastya and Rumi played by Sidharth Shukla and Sonia Rathee respectively.

== Plot ==
=== Season 1 ===
Veer lost his girlfriend Alina in a road accident 3 years ago but still hasn't been able to cope. Veer begins to hallucinate Alina and talks to her in his imagination. Alina's sister, Ishanvi and her husband Adil are motivating him to move on in his life and try to spend time with him. Due to unavoidable circumstances, Veer has to buy his cousin Kartik's house. Kartik broke up with his girlfriend Sameera 8 months ago and moved on to date Ananya. Sameera has been unable to forget Kartik and stalks him everywhere, unable to move on. Since the house belonged to Kartik and Sameera, Veer needs Sameera's signatures on the sale papers. When she signs the papers, Veer promises her to let her speak to Kartik one last time.

Veer and Sameera come up with a plan and pretend they are together to make Kartik jealous. The show then revolves around the budding relationship between Sameera and Veer.

=== Season 2 ===
Veer meets Debbie and Sameera meets Ahan. Veer and Sameera decide to marry Debbie and Ahan respectively. Then the show revolves around the realization of love for both Veer and Sameera towards each other. As Veer and Sameera separate, Veer meets Debbie and start dating, while Sameera meets her classmate, Ahan who had a crush on her formerly. In the hope of bonding with her once again, Ahan asks Sameera out and she reluctantly agrees. They soon become great friends but Sameera's past experiences stop her from being in a relationship. Meanwhile, Veer and Sameera meet once again and become friends, deciding to move on from their past experiences. Sameera gets to know that Debbie is pregnant with Veer's child and that Veer has completely turned into the Sameera she was before and has now decided to marry Debbie. Feeling insecure, she starts seeing Ahan who is madly in love with her. Soon, Veer and Sameera talk about their feelings and become intimate in a drunken state. When they finally wake up the next morning, they realize their folly and decide to tell their respective partners. In mean time, Debbie realizes that she is not pregnant and tells it to Veer who panics and Ishanvi accidentally blurts out the truth and they break up. Sameera also tells Ahan who tells her to choose between him and the one she cheated on him with. Sameera chooses Ahan out of guilt and Ahan acts as a very supportive partner. Veer, on the other hand, confesses his love to Sameera who tells him about her former choice. Thus, they part ways yet again and this time Veer has a lot of difficulty in moving on. But fate has other plans of bringing them before each other as Sameera and Ahan decide to get married in Veer's resort. And the rest of the story revolves on how these two find their way back to each other.

=== Season 3 ===
Broken But Beautiful exhibits a determined and courageous Agastya Rao who is a struggling theatre writer-director with principles and truckloads of attitude who believes the mediocre world doesn't deserve someone as talented as him and a feisty Rumi Desai who come from a different strata of society. Rumi comes from a rich family, a spill-over of her mother's second marriage. She hates her stepsister who always manages to overshadow her. But when they meet, Agastya sees the talent and intensity in Rumi. They start an intense fling. Rumi is in love with Ishaan (Ehan Bhat) her rich and suave childhood friend and tells Agastya that they can't have a future together, but Agastya has fallen in love. He falls into a trap of drunkenness and depression and Rumi gets married. After a few years, Rumi divorces Ishaan and realises he never loved her like Agastya did.

== Cast ==
=== Main ===
Actor	Role(s)	Description	Appearances		
Actor	Role(s)	Description	Season 1	Season 2	Season 3
Vikrant Massey	Veer Shekhavat	Sameera's Lover	Main	Main	Guest
Harleen Sethi	Sameera Joshi	Veer's Lover	Main	Main	Guest
Sidharth Shukla	Agastya Rao	Rumi's Love Interest			Main
Sonia Rathee	Rumi Desai	Agastya's Love Interest			Main

=== Recurring ===
Actor	Role(s)	Description	Appearances		
Actor	Role(s)	Description	Season 1	Season 2	Season 3
Sheetal Thakur	Alina	Veer's dead wife	Recurring	Recurring	
Poppy Jabbal	Ishanvi	Alina's sister and Veer's sister-in-law	Recurring	Recurring	
Nikhil Sabhrawal	Adil	Ishanvi's husband	Recurring	Recurring	
Pooja Bhamrah	Porno	Sameera's friend	Recurring	Recurring	
Akriti Singh	Agni	Sameera's friend	Recurring	Recurring	
Meherzan Mazda	Parth	Agni's husband	Recurring	Recurring	
Jitin Gulati	Kartik	Veer's cousin and Sameera's ex	Recurring	Recurring	
Simran Kaur Mundi	Ananya	Kartik's girlfriend	Recurring		
Gaurav Arora	Ahan Chaterji	Sameera's ex-boyfriend		Recurring	
Anuja Joshi	Debbie	Veer's ex-girlfriend		Recurring	
Ivan Sylvester Rodrigues	Mr. Chaterji	Ahan's Dad		Recurring	
Sameer Roy	Neil	Debbie's brother		Recurring	
Ehan Bhat	Ishan Rana	Rumi's love-interest			Recurring
Jahnavi Dhanrajgir	Sakshi	Agastya's colleague			Recurring
Manvir singh	Rishabh	Agastya's colleague			Recurring
Taniya Kalra	Farah	Agastya's friend and PR manager			Recurring
Saloni khanna	Maira	Rumi's younger sister			Recurring
Bishakha Thapa	Gul	Rumi's friend			Recurring
Bijay Anand	Dilip Desai	Rumi's step-father			Recurring
Nandini sen	Vasundhara Desai	Rumi's mother			Recurring
Pratik Parihar	Amit	Agastya's lead actor			Recurring
Tanvi Shinde	Vinny	Rumi's friend			Recurring
Karan Taneja	Navin	Agastya's Brother			Recurring

== Episodes ==
=== Series overview ===
Series	Episodes	Originally released
1	11	27 November 2018
2	10	27 November 2019
3	10	29 May 2021

=== Season 1 (2018) ===
No. overall	No. in season	Title	Directed by	Written by	Original release date
1	1	"Bleeding Memories of the Happily Ever after."	Santosh Singh	Reshu Nath	27 November 2018
2	2	"Haunting Of the Heart."	Santosh Singh	Reshu Nath	27 November 2018
3	3	"Broken Damaged Deranged"	Santosh Singh	Reshu Nath	27 November 2018
4	4	"Scared and Alone"	Santosh Singh	Reshu Nath	27 November 2018
5	5	"Found A Doppelganger Soul"	Santosh Singh	Reshu Nath	27 November 2018
6	6	"To Make Me Whole"	Santosh Singh	Reshu Nath	27 November 2018
7	7	"To Mend My Heart"	Santosh Singh	Reshu Nath	27 November 2018
8	8	"And Drown the Pain"	Santosh Singh	Reshu Nath	27 November 2018
9	9	"So I Breathe Again"	Santosh Singh	Reshu Nath	27 November 2018
10	10	"Closure"	Santosh Singh	Reshu Nath	27 November 2018
11	11	"If I Said I Love You"	Santosh Singh	Reshu Nath	27 November 2018

=== Season 2 (2019) ===
No. overall	No. in season	Title	Directed by	Written by	Original release date
12	1	"I Made You Up Inside My Head"	Harsh Dedhia	Reshu Nath	27 November 2019
13	2	"Happily Ever After"	Harsh Dedhia	Reshu Nath	27 November 2019
14	3	"Puppy Love"	Harsh Dedhia	Reshu Nath	27 November 2019
15	4	"The Penny Drops"	Harsh Dedhia	Reshu Nath	27 November 2019
16	5	"Little Death"	Harsh Dedhia	Reshu Nath	27 November 2019
17	6	"Loves Me, Loves Me Not"	Harsh Dedhia	Reshu Nath	27 November 2019
18	7	"Addicted To Love"	Harsh Dedhia	Reshu Nath	27 November 2019
19	8	"Walk Away"	Harsh Dedhia	Reshu Nath	27 November 2019
20	9	"The Perfect Mistake"	Harsh Dedhia	Reshu Nath	27 November 2019
21	10	"Broken But Beautiful"	Harsh Dedhia	Reshu Nath	27 November 2019

=== Season 3 (2021) ===
No. overall	No. in season	Title	Directed by	Written by	Original release date
22	1	"It Happened That Night"	Priyanka Ghose	Rajat Arora	29 May 2021
23	2	"Love and all other drugs"	Priyanka Ghose	Rajat Arora	29 May 2021
24	3	"You, Me, Him and Her"	Priyanka Ghose	Rajat Arora	29 May 2021
25	4	"La La La Land"	Priyanka Ghose	Rajat Arora	29 May 2021
26	5	"Crazy, Stupid, Foolish Love"	Priyanka Ghose	Rajat Arora	29 May 2021
27	6	"This Could Be Us"	Priyanka Ghose	Rajat Arora	29 May 2021
28	7	"A Sense Of The Ending"	Priyanka Ghose	Rajat Arora	29 May 2021
29	8	"Eternal Sunshine of the Helpless Mind"	Priyanka Ghose	Rajat Arora	29 May 2021
30	9	"The Fault in Their Stars"	Priyanka Ghose	Rajat Arora	29 May 2021
31	10	"And so, begin again"	Priyanka Ghose	Rajat Arora	29 May 2021

== Soundtrack ==
=== Season 1 ===
Broken But Beautiful

Soundtrack album by Rana Mazumder and Yash Narvekar
- Released: 16 November 2018
- Label: Sony Music India
- Producers: Ekta Kapoor; Shobha Kapoor Broken But Beautiful S-4* = Manish Singh

Track listing
No.	Title	Lyrics	Music	Singer(s)	Length
1.	"Ye Kya Hua"	Amitabh Bhattacharya	Rana Mazumder	Shreya Ghoshal, Dev Negi	4:12
2.	"Laute Nahi"	Yash Narvekar	Yash Narvekar	Papon	4:09
Total length:					8:21

=== Season 2 ===
Broken But Beautiful - Season 2

Soundtrack album by Amaal Mallik, Akhil Sachdeva, Vishal Mishra and Sandman
- Released: 30 May 2020
- Label: Zee Music Company
- Producers: Ekta Kapoor; Shobha Kapoor

Track listing
No.	Title	Lyrics	Music	Singer(s)	Length
1.	"Teri Hogaiyaan"	Vishal Mishra	Vishal Mishra	Vishal Mishra	2:55
2.	"O Saajna"	Akhil Sachdeva	Akhil Sachdeva	Akhil Sachdeva	4:44
3.	"Shaamein"	Manoj Muntashir	Amaal Mallik	Armaan Malik	3:13
4.	"Boureya"	Akshay Shinde	Sandman	Anusha Mani	3:33
Total length:					14:25

=== Season 3 ===
Broken But Beautiful - Season 3

Soundtrack album by Amaal Mallik, Akhil Sachdeva, Vishal Mishra and Sandman
- Released: 28 May 2021
- Length: 22:23
- Label: Zee Music Company
- Producers: Ekta Kapoor; Shobha Kapoor

Track listing
No.	Title	Lyrics	Music	Singer(s)	Length
1.	"Mere Liye"	Akhil Sachdeva	Akhil Sachdeva	Akhil Sachdeva	4:54
2.	"Tere Naal"	Akhil Sachdeva	Akhil Sachdeva	Akhil Sachdeva	4:17
3.	"Kya Kiya Hain Tune"	Rashmi Virag	Amaal Malik	Armaan Malik, Palak Muchhal	3:11
4.	"Teri Hogaiyaan 2"	Vishal Mishra, Kaushal Kishore	Vishal Mishra	Vishal Mishra	3:36
5.	"Hun Jaavaan"	Ginny Diwan	Sandman	Romy, Anusha Mani	6:25
Total length:					22:23
