= Haasil (Indian TV series) =

Indian drama television series

- Written by: Samir Arrora, Shashank Shekhar
- Creative directors: PRITISH DAS, Shashank Srivastava
- Starring: Zayed Khan; Nikita Dutta; Vatsal Sheth
- Country of origin: India
- Original language: Hindi
- No. of seasons: 1
- No. of episodes: 82

Production
- Production location: Mumbai, India
- Camera setup: Multi-camera
- Running time: Approx. 15–23 minutes
- Production company: Alchemy Productions

Original release
- Network: Sony Entertainment Television
- Release: 30 October 2017 – 23 February 2018

Haasil (trans Achievement) is an Indian drama television series broadcast by Sony Entertainment Television and produced by Siddhartha P. Malhotra under the banner of Alchemy Productions. The series ran from 30 October 2017 to 23 February 2018.

Actor Zayed Khan makes his television debut with this show. The show also stars Nikita Dutta and Vatsal Sheth.

== Plot ==
Haasil is the story of two brothers Ranvir and Kabir Raichand, whose lives get entwined with the entry of a smart and righteous lawyer, Aanchal Shrivastav.

The Raichands are a rich and influential family where the husband Jatin Raichand is often sidelined by his wife, Sarika. Their sons Ranvir and Kabir mean the world to them. Ranvir—the older brother—is a rational, generous, and selfless tycoon while Kabir is the opposite—protective of his loved ones (especially his brother) but a playboy.

Meanwhile, Aanchal hails from a middle-class background. Her family comprises her mother Rupali and younger brother Aman. She lost her father at a young age. She runs an NGO and takes up a case of a kidnap & murder victim, who turns out to be Ranvir's secretary. She assumes him to be guilty and has him arrested. The Raichands, except Ranvir, develop an instant dislike for Aanchal. As the case proceeds, the victim is murdered. However, Kabir brings evidence into the court, implicating the victim's boyfriend, who teamed up with her to con the Raichands for money. Ranvir is immediately released and Aanchal apologises but Kabir vows revenge on Aanchal.

Initial misunderstandings are cleared up and Ranvir hires Aanchal to work for their company where she rubs off his cousin, Gaurav, the wrong way. Ranvir falls in love with Aanchal but Kabir woos her to exact revenge not knowing that Ranvir loves her. Aman is suspicious of Kabir. Later, it is revealed that Kabir planned to lead Aanchal on and dump her right before their wedding to humiliate her. However, Kabir genuinely falls in love with Aanchal. Aanchal too falls in love after seeing a different hidden, caring side to him. Sarika doesn't approve, because Aanchal's horoscope says that her first husband will die soon. She wants Kabir to marry Naina, his childhood friend but Ranvir is shown taking Kabir's side and supporting Kabir and Anchal's love by going against Sarika.

When Aanchal is shot at, Kabir takes the bullet for her. It is revealed that the bullet was shot by Gaurav, who was acting on the instructions of Sarika. Naina also has an ulterior motive because she wants Kabir's money to repay the debts incurred by her brother Rohan. Meanwhile, Ranvir is diagnosed with a brain tumor. He suggests that Aanchal marry him first so that the prediction of her first husband's death is fulfilled and she and Kabir can live happily ever after.

But Ranvir is the master manipulator—he bribed the family priest (pandit) to make the false prediction, manipulated Gaurav and then killed him, and then faked a brain tumor—all for Aanchal. He even hands over his title as CEO to Kabir. Aanchal and Ranvir, meanwhile, are still married and an upset Kabir blames Aanchal, accusing her of loving a loser and marrying the winner. Jatin reveals to Aanchal that neither Ranvir nor Kabir are Sarika's biological children. Kabir was his son with his first wife who died. He then married Sarika and they adopted Ranvir.

When Ranvir realizes Aanchal and Kabir still love each other, he bribes Naina and Rohan by paying off Rohan's debts. He makes Naina fake a pregnancy so Aanchal and Sarika would insist on Kabir marrying Naina. Kabir knows Naina is lying and since it is too early for a paternity test, he digs into Naina's past and finds David, a musician whose child she aborted because she wanted to trap Kabir. David and Kabir team up.

Ranvir notices Aman is suspicious of the drama surrounding Aanchal (who now trusts Kabir but not Ranvir) and tries to get him out of the way, by secretly helping him land a dream job in Dubai. Aman teams up with Kabir to look for evidence against Naina which reveals nothing, although everybody knows about the fake pregnancy. Ranvir threatens Naina and Rohan to leave the city and they do so. Ranvir confesses his love to Aanchal. Kabir then brings an American surgeon to operate on Ranvir. Ranvir manages to fake his way through the operation and is released from the hospital after an apparently successful surgery. Kabir and Aanchal decide to wait until Ranvir has recovered to get a divorce.

A month later, Ranvir and Aanchal are still married and Kabir is insecure. Aman has left for Dubai. After Kabir asks his brother to let Aanchal go, he finds out that Ranvir is planning to move to Mauritius forever. Upon confrontation, Ranvir remains cryptic. However, he makes sure that Kabir follows him and sees a house which Ranvir has turned into a shrine of Aanchal—her pictures are everywhere and Kabir realizes that Ranvir has always loved her. Kabir decides to sacrifice his love. He forces himself on Aanchal in an attempt to get her to hate him and choose Ranvir. Aanchal is mortified. Kabir's misconduct is shunned by everyone. His father asks him to leave the house, all the while knowing the reasons for Kabir's actions and keeping them hidden from Sarika.

With Kabir and Aman gone, Ranvir goes a step further in his conquest for Aanchal's love. He bribes a worker to add rat poison in the food catered by Aanchal's mother, Rupali. A crowd gathers to confront Rupali since people are critically ill after eating the food. She is publicly shamed. Ranvir is watching all this and decides to enter once they attack Aanchal. But as it turns out Kabir has seen this news and doesn't board his flight to Mauritius but instead goes to rescue Rupali and Aanchal. Despite this the police arrest Rupali and Ranvir takes the blame for her, since her health is deteriorating. He manages to manipulate the situation and put the blame on Rohan. Aanchal is grateful to him.

However, she realizes that Kabir may have intentionally led her to hate him, and confronts him. Aanchal decides to stay on as Ranvir's wife, since Kabir threatens to kill himself otherwise. Sarika is unhappy and it is revealed that she killed Kabir's mother by pushing her off the terrace years ago, in order to become part of the Raichand family. She had been scheming from the beginning. She tries to bring Aanchal and Kabir closer to provoke Ranvir. Ranvir is on the edge and when Jatin learns his truth, Ranvir kills him and makes it look like suicide. When Ranvir doesn't let Aanchal take the body for post-mortem, she investigates and is convinced that he is the murderer. Ranvir threatens her too and she waits for an opportunity. Rohan tries to communicate with Aanchal at Jatin's funeral but Ranvir kills him before they team up. Aanchal then fakes a suicide attempt and Kabir gets to her before Ranvir and takes her to the hospital. Ranvir threatens to endanger Aman (who is back in Mumbai) and Rupali when Aanchal pulls a stunt to make him jealous—resulting in a crowd witnessing Ranvir's madness as he relentlessly beats up Aanchal's comrade. Kabir still refuses to believe Aanchal's claims about Ranvir.

Aanchal poisons Ranvir's drink but he reveals that he has the antidote and instead poisoned Kabir. Ranvir reveals his true colours to Kabir and Aanchal takes him to the hospital when blood comes out of his mouth. Upon reaching the hospital, Aanchal and Kabir are attacked by Ranvir's goons and beat Kabir. Ranvir arrives and locks him up in a hut and burns it in front of Aanchal. Aanchal tempts to commit suicide by smashing her head in a temple. Ranvir prays for Aanchal's recovery but the temple priest reveals that Ranvir never understood the true meaning of love and that Aanchal had prayed to put an end to Ranvir's plans and to kill him. Ranvir realizes his mistakes and finds that Aanchal has gotten herself into deep shock (mistaking Ranvir for Kabir after his apparent death). Ranvir must play along to think that he is Kabir. Ranvir takes Aanchal home and reveals to Sarika that he killed Kabir even though he now regrets it. This shocks Sarika. In a turn of events, it is revealed she was only after money, caring neither about Jatin or Kabir. She scolds Ranvir for killing Kabir, as Jatin had left everything to him in the will. Ranvir is her biological son whom she left at an orphanage so she could come back to get him when she became a Raichand. Ranvir knew the truth all along and claimed that she is responsible for who he is today.

Kabir, who is alive shows up in Aanchal's room and comforts her. He then vows to get revenge on Ranvir. Aanchal, Kabir, Aman and Rupali are all in on the plan. Kabir threatens Dr Agnihotri, bribes everyone working for Ranvir and they all turn to be on his side. Dr Agnihotri informs Sarika that Aanchal (who is faking her mental state) must go to rehab.

It was revealed that Kabir was never poisoned and Aman dug a hole outside the hut and rescued Kabir. Sarika looks up to a man named Roy who her husband orders to kill Aanchal but Roy is actually working with Kabir and Aanchal. Roy holds Aanchal by gunpoint and reveals to Ranvir that he is his biological father. Ranvir kicks Sarika out of the Raichand house because of her wrongdoings over the years and severs ties with her. Kabir asks Sarika to reveal his plan to end Ranvir's game to him. Sarika tells Ranvir that Kabir and Aanchal have played him all along and Aanchal is chased by Ranvir in the forest. Kabir intervenes and goes face to face with Ranvir. They have a fight and Ranvir takes a shot at Kabir but Aanchal takes the bullet and dies in Ranvir's arms. Ranvir goes into shock and Aman brings the police in. Aanchal regains her consciousness and recalls taking help from Dr. Agnihotri to slow down her heartbeat and breathing and replacing the bullets in Ranvir's gun by blanks.

The show takes a one-month leap forward and newly-weds Kabir and Aanchal arrive in front of a Mental Healthcare Centre to see Ranvir who is busy writing 'I love you Aanchal' with his blood. Kabir and Aanchal grow sad upon learning that Ranvir will never improve. As the happy couple leave the centre, the last shot is of Ranvir, looking sinisterly at them, implying that he is pretending to be in a mental state.

== Cast ==
=== Main ===
- Zayed Khan as Ranvir Raichand — Kabir's adoptive elder step brother and Aanchal's former husband (2017–18)
- Nikita Dutta as Aanchal Srivastav/Aanchal Ranvir Raichand/Aanchal Kabir Raichand — Kabir's wife and Ranvir's former wife (2017–18)
- Vatsal Sheth as Kabir Raichand — Ranvir's adoptive younger stepbrother and Aanchal's second husband (2017–18)

=== Recurring ===
- Sheeba Akashdeep as Sarika Jatin Raichand, Jatin's second wife, Ranvir's mother and Kabir's stepmother (2017–18)
- Yamini Singh as Rupali Srivastav, Aanchal and Aman's mother (2017–18)
- Chirag Mahbubani as Aman Srivastav, Aanchal's younger brother and Ranvir and Kabir's brother-in-law. (2017–18)
- Mohit Chauhan as Jatin Raichand, Sarika's husband, Ranvir's adoptive father, Kabir's father (dead) (2017–18)
- Deepak Wadhwa as David, Naina's ex-boyfriend (2017–18)
- Savant Singh Premi as Gaurav Raichand, Ranvir and Kabir's cousin (2017–18)(dead)
- Minal Mogam as Naina Kapoor, Kabir's ex-fiancée (2017–18)
- Akash Pratap Singh as Rohan Kapoor, Naina's brother (dead) (2017–18)
- Salman Shaikh as Dr. Agnihotri, Ranvir's doctor (2017)
- Ahmad Harhash as Yuvi Kapoor, Kabir's friend (2017–18)

== Reception ==
Initially, the show was in the news for its larger than life look and a huge budget including the fact that it was the first Indian television show being shot only at outdoor locations. First week reviews were mixed with Zayed Khan's performance 'failing to impress' according to one review that appeared in national daily The Times of India. Another review on Bollywood Life praised actress Nikita Dutta's performance and claimed that in the first episode, she outshone both male leads.
