= Harleen Sethi =

Indian actress (born 1992)

- Born: 23 June 1992 (age 34); Mumbai, Maharashtra
- Education: Narsee Monjee Institute of Management Studies
- Occupation: Actress
- Years active: 2013–present

Harleen Sethi (born 23 June 1992) is an Indian actress who primarily works in Hindi television and web series. Sethi is best known for her portrayal in the series Broken But Beautiful, Kohrra and Doctors. In 2025, she expanded to Hindi films with Be Happy.

== Early life ==
Sethi was born on 23 June 1992 in Mumbai, Maharashtra. She completed her schooling from Jankidevi Public School in Andheri, and subsequently pursued her graduation from Narsee Monjee Institute of Management Studies(NMIMS).

== Career ==
Sethi started her acting career with the 2013 film Country of Bodies: Bombay in Dance, following which she appeared in the 2014 Punjabi film Mundeyan Ton Bachke Rahin. Sethi then made her debut on television in 2015, with Gulmohar Grand, where she played Tina, one of the hotel staff. She then hosted Yarri Dosti Shaadi and India Adventures, both in 2016. Sethi portrayed a rapper Bani in Gabru: Hip Hop Ke Shehzaade opposite Amol Parashar in 2018.

From 2018 to 2021, Sethi portrayed Sameera, a heartbroken girl opposite Vikrant Massey, in Broken But Beautiful. The series proved to be her breakthrough and earned her recognition. Soumya Rao of Scroll.in noted, "Sethi’s rendition of Samira is one of the high points of the series. The actress infuses pathos into Samira’s desperation and makes her character likable and admirable."

In 2022, Sethi appeared in three web series: Flirteen, where she played Priya, The Gone Game, where she played a CBI officer Sharmila and Kathmandu Connection, where she played a RAW agent Tasneem. For the latter, Archika Khurana of Times of India stated, "The way Sethi is dressed like a 90s heroine makes her look even more stunning. She was, however, unable to provide depth to her character Tasneem, an intelligence officer."

The year 2023 proved to be a turning point in her career. She first played Nimrit, a police officer's daughter in an unhappy marriage alongside Barun Sobti in Kohrra. Saibal Chatterjee opined that the series gave ample scope to Sethi to make her presence felt. She then played Preeti, a gangster's wife in Sultan of Delhi opposite Tahir Raj Bhasin. Nandini Ramnath felt Sethi was wasted in the series following her "nuanced" performance in Kohrra.

Sethi had two web releases in 2024, Bad Cop and Doctors. She played Devika, a police officer in Bad Cop opposite Gulshan Devaiah. Suparna Sharma of The Week noted, "Sethi, who plays the angry cop-wife, is quite good, but like all characters, she too is single-note." In Doctors, Sethi played a resident doctor Nitya opposite Sharad Kelkar. Mayur Sanap of Rediff.com stated, "Sethi is a tad better in a role that gives her a vast emotional range to showcase. She is especially good in the scenes that show the patient-doctor relationship."

Sethi expanded to Hindi films with Be Happy, her first release of 2025. She played Rohini opposite Abhishek Bachchan. Hardika Gupta of NDTV stated, "Sethi in a brief but significant role as Dhara's late mother, is underutilised." Sethi will next appear in a mystery thriller on Netflix.

== Personal life ==
From 2018 to 2019, Sethi was in a relationship with actor Vicky Kaushal. The couple broke up in early 2019.

In 2024, Sethi revealed that she had been diagnosed with PCOD.

== Filmography ==
Key
†	Denotes films that have not yet been released

=== Films ===
Year	Title	Role	Notes	Ref.
2013	Country of Bodies: Bombay in Dance	Herself		
2014	Mundeyan Ton Bachke Rahin	Jaan #3	Punjabi film	
2017	Love, Bites	Meghna	Short film	
2020	Nice to Meet You	Niharika	Short film	
2025	Be Happy	Rohini Rastogi		
TBA	Woh Ladki Hai Kahaan? †	TBA	Post-production	

=== Television ===
Year	Title	Role	Notes	Ref.
2015	Gulmohar Grand	Tina		
2016	Yarri Dosti Shaadi	Host		
2016	India Adventures	Host		
2018	Gabru: Hip Hop Ke Shehzaade	Rapper Bani		
2019	MTV Ace of Space	Herself	Season 2	

=== Web series ===
Year	Title	Role	Notes	Ref.
2018–2021	Broken But Beautiful	Sameera Joshi		
2020	Bandish Bandits	Unnamed	Special appearance in song: "Chedkhaniyaan"	
2022	Flirteen	Priya		
2022	The Gone Game	Sharmila Gupta	Season 2	
2022	Kathmandu Connection	Tasneem		
2023	Kohrra	Nimrat Kaur		
2023	Sultan of Delhi	Preeti Ganmukh Patel		
2024	Bad Cop	SHO Devika Naik		
2024	Doctors	Dr. Nitya Vasu		
2026	Shaque: Trust No One	Shreya		

=== Music videos ===
Year	Title	Singer	Ref.
2022	Dooron Dooron	Paresh Pahuja	

== Discography ==
Year	Song	Album	Ref.
2018	"Teri Hogaiyaan"	Broken But Beautiful	

== Awards and nominations ==
Year	Award	Category	Work	Result	Ref.
2023	Filmfare OTT Awards	Best Supporting Actor Female – Drama Series	Kohrra	Nominated	
2024	Indian Film Festival of Melbourne	Best Actress – Series	Kohrra	Nominated	

== See also ==
- List of Indian television actresses
- List of Hindi television actresses
