= Sanjeeda Sheikh =

Indian actress (born 1984)

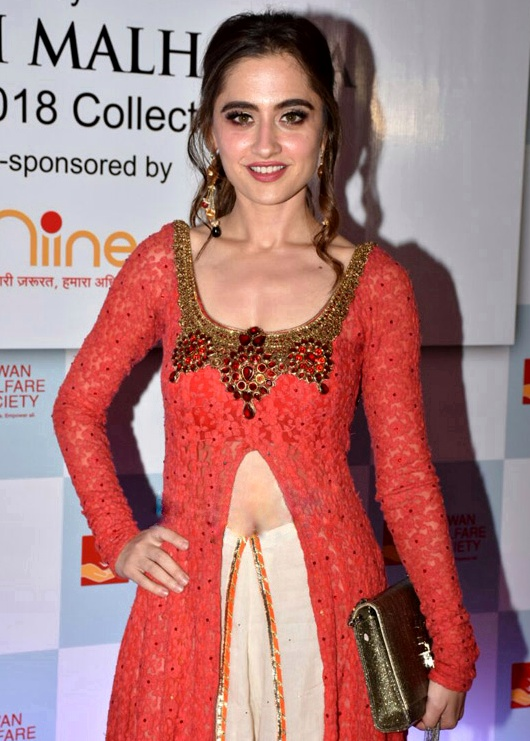
- Sheikh in Manish Malhotra's Show
- Born: 20 December 1984 (age 41); Kuwait City, Kuwait
- Occupation: Actress
- Years active: 2005–present
- Spouse: Aamir Ali (m. 2012; div. 2021)
- Children: 1

Sanjeeda Sheikh (born 20 December 1984) is an Indian actress who works in the Hindi films and television. She made her television debut as Namrata Mathuria in Kyaa Hoga Nimmo Kaa (2006) followed by Ayesha Shergill in Kayamath (2007-2009). Sheikh is best known for playing dual role in crime drama Ek Hasina Thi (2014), an aspiring actress in romantic drama Love Ka Hai Intezaar (2017). The former earned her ITA Award for Best Actress.

She has since taken parts in films include the thriller drama Taish (2020), the aerial action Fighter (2024) and the period drama series Heeramandi (2024) for which she was nominated at Filmfare OTT Award for Best Supporting Actress in a Drama Series.

== Early life ==
She was born 20 December 1984 in Kuwait into a Muslim family who hail from Ahmedabad, Gujarat.

== Career ==
=== Debut and success in television (2003–2019) ===
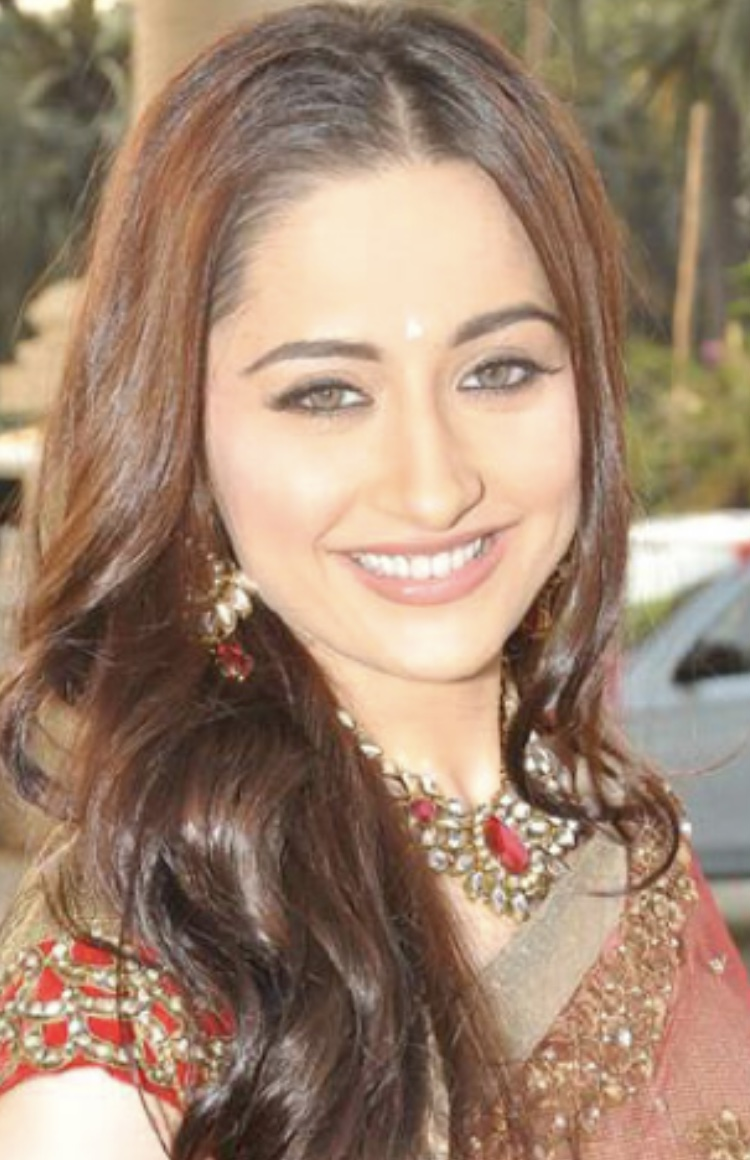
Sheikh in 2014

Sanjeeda has played various roles on television soap operas. She made her acting debut as Nimmo in the 2005 TV series Kyaa Hoga Nimmo Kaa. After that, she appeared as a vamp in the 2007 Star Plus series Kayamath. In the same year, she participated in a dancing competition show named Nach Baliye 3, with husband Aamir Ali, the couple won the competition.

In 2008, she appeared in the serial Kya Dill Main Hai opposite Aamir Ali which was telecasted on 9X channel.

In 2014, Sheikh appeared as Durga Thakur, an ambitious and confident young woman, who is seeking justice for her sister, in Ek Hasina Thi. The serial was the breakthrough of her career as her performance was acclaimed by critics and viewers and it was one of the most successful shows of Star Plus at that time.

In 2016, she appeared as Dhani in Ishq Ka Rang Safed which was the first time Sheikh played an onscreen mother, of a 5-year-old child.

In March 2017 Sheikh appeared as Renya in a supernatural web series, titled Gehraiyaan, opposite her Ek Hasina Thi co-star Vatsal Sheth. The web series is directed by debutante director Sidhant Sachdev and produced by the Vikram Bhatt production house. In 2017, Sheikh appeared as Kamini Mathur, a superstar, in a tv series titled Love Ka Hai Intezaar, opposite Keith Sequeira aired by Star Plus. The show was earlier titled as Kya Tu Meri Lage.

=== Further expansion (2020–present) ===
In 2020, Sheikh made her Hindi film debut with Taish, playing Jahaan opposite Harshvardhan Rane. That same year, she played the character of Priya in the Netflix horror film Kaali Khuhi, opposite Shabana Azmi.

Sheikh first release of 2024, was Fighter, where she played an Air Force officer's wife Saachi, opposite Karan Singh Grover. Tushar Joshi of India Today stated, "Sanjeeda Shaikh provide the right support to able front-footers." A commercial success, it became the highest-grossing Hindi film of the year. In the same year, she played a courtesan Waheeda in Sanjay Leela Bhansali's series Heeramandi. Shomini Sen of WION noted, "Sanjeeda Sheikh create an impact with her tragic character."

On 10 July 2026, she appeared in two simultaneous film releases. She portrayed the wife of a politician's spoiled son in the Netflix courtroom drama Ikka, starring Sunny Deol and Akshaye Khanna, and played Rosy in the ensemble adventure comedy Dhamaal 4, led by Ajay Devgn.

== Personal life ==
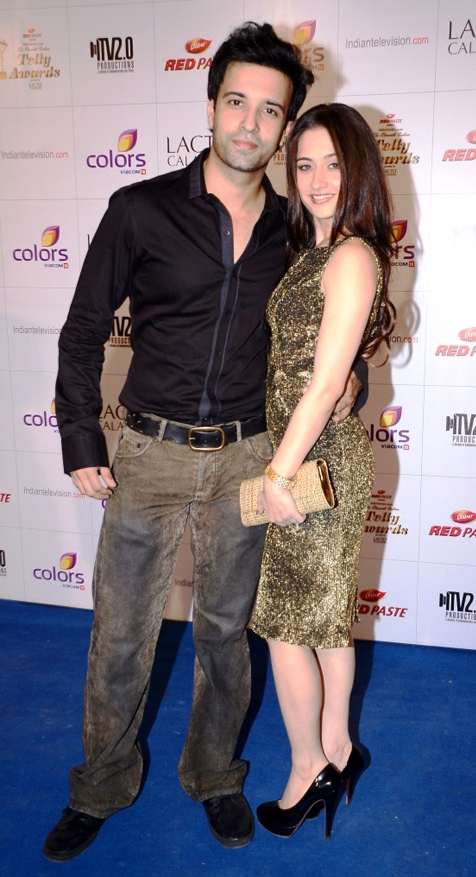
Sanjeeda Sheikh with former husband Aamir Ali

On 2 March 2012, she married her longtime boyfriend Aamir Ali. In August 2020, it was revealed that the couple has a one-year old daughter, Ayra Ali, through surrogacy. The couple separated in 2020 after 8 years of marriage and were granted divorce in 2021 with Sheikh getting their daughter's custody.

== Filmography ==
Key
†	Denotes films that have not yet been released

=== Films ===
Year	Title	Role	Notes	Ref.
2003	Baghban	Nilli	Cameo appearance	
2005	Ponniyin Selvan	Priya	Tamil film	
2006	Shubham	Priya	Kannada film	
2010	Pankh	Kusum		
2018	Ashke	Jiya	Punjabi film	
2018	Nawabzaade	Herself	Guest appearance in song "Mummy Kasam"	
2020	Taish	Jahaan Brar	Hindi-Punjabi bilingual film	
2020	Kaali Khuhi	Priya		
2022	Main Te Bapu	Mahi	Punjabi film	
2024	Fighter	Saachi Gill		
2026	Ikka	Gauri Gaur	Netflix film	
2026	Dhamaal 4	Rosy		
2026	Toxic	Kamala	Kannada-English bilingual film; special appearance	
2026	Jeevan Ya Bheema Con? †	Yojana		
TBA	Kun Faya Kun †	TBA	Post-production	

=== Television ===
Year	Title	Role	Notes	Ref.
2006–2007	Kyaa Hoga Nimmo Kaa	Namrata "Nimmo" Sehgal		
2007–2009	Kayamath	Ayesha Shergill		
2007	Nach Baliye 3	Contestant	Winner	
2008	Kya Dill Mein Hai	Naina Oberoi		
2008	Nach Baliye 4	Host		
2009–2010	Jaane Pehchaane Se... Ye Ajnabbi	Ayesha		
2010	Zara Nachke Dikha 2	Contestant	Winner	
2011	Hi! Padosi... Kaun Hai Doshi?	Sejal Mehta		
2011	Piya Ka Ghar Pyaara Lage	Sejal Mehta		
2012	Ramleela – Ajay Devgn Ke Saath	Surpanakha		
2013	Badalte Rishton Ki Dastaan	Meera Ranaut		
2014	Ek Hasina Thi	Durga Thakur / Nitya Mitra / Durga Dev Goenka		
2015–2016	Power Couple	Contestant	4th place	
2016	Ishq Ka Rang Safed	Dhani Tripathi		
2017	Love Ka Hai Intezaar	Kamini Mathur		
2017	Gehraiyaan	Dr. Reyna Kapoor		
2024	Heeramandi: The Diamond Bazaar	Waheeda	Netflix series	
2026	Dhindora	Kavita Mami	Netflix series; Season 2	

==== Special appearances ====
Year	Title	Role	Ref.
2008	Nachle Ve with Saroj Khan	Herself	
2010	Sapna Babul Ka... Bidaai	Herself	
2013	Bigg Boss 6	Herself	
2015	Jhalak Dikhhla Jaa 8	Herself	
2015	Tashan-e-Ishq	Herself	
2015	Bhagyalaxmi	Herself	
2016	Swaragini – Jodein Rishton Ke Sur	Herself	
2018	Roop – Mard Ka Naya Swaroop	Herself	
2018	Kundali Bhagya	Herself	
2018	Tantra	Herself	
2018	Naagin 3	Herself	
2019	Kumkum Bhagya	Herself	

=== Music videos ===
Year	Title	Singer(s)	Ref.
2017	Bas Ek Baar	Soham Naik	
2018	Ajnabee	Soham Naik	
2018	Tum Aaoge	Soham Naik, Ritrisha Sarmah	
2019	Sajda Karu	Stebin Ben	
2019	Kalla Sohna Nai	Akhil	
2019	Ruka Hoon	Jigar Saraiya	
2021	Toh Aa Gaye Hum	Jubin Nautiyal, Mithoon	
2021	Saiyaan	Jass Manak	
2022	Chaha Hai Tujhko	Sanjeev Rathod	

== Awards and nominations ==
Year	Award	Category	Work	Result	Ref.
2006	Indian Telly Awards	Fresh New Face – Female	Kyaa Hoga Nimmo Kaa	Nominated	
2008	Zee Gold Awards	Best Actress in a Negative Role	Kayamath	Won	
2008	Indian Telly Awards	Best Actress in a Negative Role	Kayamath	Nominated	
2011	Zee Gold Awards	Most Stylish Actress	—N/a	Won	
2014	Indian Television Academy Awards	Desh Ki Dhadkan - Best Actress	Ek Haseena Thi	Nominated	
2014	Indian Television Academy Awards	Gr8! Performer Of The Year (Female)	Ek Haseena Thi	Won	
2019	PTC Punjabi Film Awards	Best Debut Actress	Ashke	Won	
2025	Filmfare OTT Awards	Best Supporting Actress in a Drama Series	Heeramandi: The Diamond Bazaar	Nominated	

== See also ==
- List of Indian television actresses
- List of Indian film actresses
