= Nachle Ve with Saroj Khan =

- Created by: Fazila Allana and Kamna Menezes
- Starring: Saroj Khan; Drashti Dhami; Neil Bhatt; Karishma Tanna; Kavita Kaushik; Aamir Ali; Sanaya Irani; Sanjeeda Sheikh; Arjun Bijlani; Ragini Khanna; Divyanka Tripathi; Rashami Desai
- Opening theme: "Nachle Ve"
- Country of origin: India

Production
- Cinematography: Nitesh choudhary

Original release
- Network: NDTV Imagine
- Release: 21 January 2008 – 31 December 2011

Nachle Ve with Saroj Khan is Dance class show hosted by Saroj Khan. Nachle Ve with Saroj Khan Premiered from 21 January 2008 and lasted for 3 seasons. Season 2 aired from 25 October 2010 to 3 December 2010, while Season 3 aired from 28 November 2011 to 31 December 2011.

== Show People ==
=== Teachers ===
- Saroj Khan ... Head Teacher(Headmaster A.k.a. Masterji)
- Manish ... Co-teacher Only for Duet Song
- Yogesh ... New Teacher (Dard-e-Disco Song Episode Only)
- Jasmin and Bhavna...New teachers (only for Jai Jai Shiv Shankar song episode)

=== Songs ===
2010

- 25 October: Munni Badnaam Hui - Dabangg
- 28 October: Tum Jo Aaye Zindagi Mein - Once Upon in Mumbaai
- 2 November: Main Tera Dhadkan Teri - Ajab Prem Ki Gajab
- November: Chunari Chunari- Biwi No.1.

=== Students ===
- Swati Bajpai ... Also known as Swata for singing boy's line.
- Minakshi Dixit
- Bhakti
- Shivam (Child - boy)
- Piyush (Child - boy)
- Sagar (Child - boy)
- Rishi basatwar (Child - boy)
- Devendra (Child - boy)
- Sneha (Child - girl)
- Urmin
- Neha
- DEEPAK
- Manisha Kumari
- Nikita (child-girl)
- Kadambari (child-girl)
- Bundini
- Gunjan Lal
- Yogesh
- Archana
- Kathak-Rupal

=== Other ===
- Nirmalbhai ... Dholki
- Sharad Malhotra and Divyanka Tripathi as Couple Featured On Valentine's Day Special
- Shweta Salve as Guest Contestant
- Gaurav Chopra as Guest Contestant
- Delnaaz Irani as Guest Contestant
- Manav Gohil as Guest Contestant
- Karishma Tanna as Guest Contestant
- Ameesha Patel as Guest Contestant
- Rubina Dilaik and Sriti Jha as Guest Contestants
- Sanjeeda Sheikh and Aamir Ali as Guest Contestants
- Aashka Goradia as Guest Contestant
- Panchi Bora and Jay Bhanushali
- Drashti Dhami
- Rati Pandey

Season 3 2011:

- Jennifer Winget - Finale Host
- Gaurav Khanna as Host
- Vidya Balan - Guest for 'Ooh La La' song
- Ashita & Chaitanya - Winners for episode 'Aivayi Aivayi'
- Shaleen Bhanot & Daljeet Kaur Bhanot - Winners for episode Chammak Challo' against Jay Bhanushali and Mahii Vij
- Ami Trivedi & Jasveer Kaur - Guest for 'Sajna ji vaari vaari' song
- Sukirti Kandpal & Prerna Wanvari - Guest for 'Darling' song from 7 Khoon Maaf
