= Meherzan Mazda =

Indian actor

- Born: Dahanu, Maharashtra, India
- Occupation: Actor
- Years active: 2010–present
- Spouse: Naomi Felfeli (m. 2025)

Meherzan Mazda is an Indian film and television actor best known for starring in Nisha Aur Uske Cousins, Shakti, and The Ba***ds of Bollywood.

== Personal life ==
On 6 December 2025, Mazda married his longtime girlfriend Indo-Iranian, Naomi Felfeli.

== Career ==
Mazda started off with MTV India's reality show Splitsvilla 2. He made his television acting debut with the show Seven as Mastishk on Sony TV. He gained popularity in 2014 as Umesh Gangwal in Star Plus's Nisha Aur Uske Cousins. After that he was a part of shows like Dhhai Kilo Prem, Khottey Sikkey also works in campus dairies

He also worked in Luv Ka The End as one of the main protagonists. He will be seen in the movie Basthi Hai Sasthi as Sukhshinder Moidutty. In 2018, he was seen in Kaisi Yeh Yaariyaan 3 as Smaran Hehbar. From 2018 to 2019, he portrayed Mahabbat in Colors TV's Dastaan-E-Mohabbat: Salim Anarkali.

== Filmography ==
=== Television ===
Year	Title	Role
2009–10	MTV Splitsvilla 2	Contestant
2010	Seven	Mastishk Kashyap
2014–15	Nisha Aur Uske Cousins	Umesh Gangwal
2017	Dhhai Kilo Prem	Piyush Sharma
2018	Laal Ishq	Rishabh
2018	Box Cricket League 3	Contestant
2018	Salim Anarkali	Mahabbat
2020–21	Shakti	Rohan Singh
2023	Tere Ishq Mein Ghayal	Mahir Damania
2025–2026	Itti Si Khushi	Percy Irani

=== Film ===
Year	Title	Role	Notes
2011	Luv Ka The End	Timmy	
2022	Judaa Hoke Bhi	Siddharth Jaiwardhan	
2024	Auron Mein Kahan Dum Tha	Adv Raghuvanshi	
2025	Tumko Meri Kasam	Rajeev Khosla	
2025	The Bhootnii	Karishma's Boyfriend	

=== Web series ===
Year	Title	Role	Platform	Notes
2017	Gehraiyaan	Surya	Viu	
2018	Kaisi Yeh Yaariyaan 3	Smaran	Voot	
2018	Zindabad	Aamir Shaikh	VB on Web	
2018–2019	Broken But Beautiful	Parth	ALTBalaji and ZEE5	Season 1 and 2
2022–2026	Campus Diaries	Nikhil	MX Player	Season 1 and 2
2022	Modern Love Mumbai	Abdullah	Amazon Prime Video	
2024	Hustlers	Manoj	Amazon MiniTV	
2025	The Ba***ds of Bollywood	Jeejeebhoy	Netflix	
