= Awarapan 2 (soundtrack) =

2026 film soundtrack album

Soundtrack album by Mithoon, Amaal Mallik, Jeet Gannguli, Wasif Ahmad and Akhil Sachdeva
- Released: 11 August 2026
- Recorded: 2025–2026
- Studios: Rangayan Broad Q’s studio, New Delhi; YRF Studios, Mumbai; Livingwater Music
- Genre: Feature film soundtrack
- Length: 54:10
- Language: Hindi
- Label: Sony Music
- Producers: Godswill Mergulhão; Vaibhav Pani; BLUK; DJ Phukan; Abhishek Bhatia; Prasad S
External audio
- Awarapaan 2 – Official Audio Jukebox on YouTube

Singles from Awarapan 2
- 1. "Ve Junoon" Released: 7 July 2026; 2. "Yeh Awarapan" Released: 21 July 2026; 3. "Tera Mera Rishta Continues" Released: 6 August 2026

Awarapan 2 (transl. Vagrancy 2) is the soundtrack album to the 2026 film of the same name directed by Nitin Kakkar. Produced by Vishesh Bhatt under Vishesh Films. A sequel to Awarapan (2007), the film stars Emraan Hashmi, Disha Patani and Shabana Azmi. The soundtrack features songs composed by Mithoon, Jeet Gannguli, Amaal Mallik, Akhil Sachdeva and Wasif Ahmad with lyrics written by Rashmi Virag, Akhil Sachdeva, Sachin Urmtosh and Sayeed Quadri. The album was released under the Sony Music label.

== Background ==
The album is composed by Mithoon, Jeet Gannguli, Amaal Mallik, Akhil Sachdeva and Wasif Ahmad with lyrics written by Rashmi Virag, Akhil Sachdeva, Sachin Urmtosh and Sayeed Quadri with vocals performed by Subodhh Sharma, Arijit Singh, Akhil Sachdeva, Saaj Bhatt, Shreya Ghoshal, and Jubin Nautiyal. The film score is composed by Raju Singh.

== Development ==
Vishesh Bhatt confirmed that Sayeed Quadri would return, alongside Mithoon, who replaced Pritam as composer. Emraan Hashmi spoke about his expectations for the album.

Two songs from the original film, "Tera Mera Rishta" and "Toh Phir Aao"—both composed by Pritam and originally sung by Mustafa Zahid—have been reimagined for the sequel by Mithoon and Sayeed Quadri, along with a newly written composition. Quadri said that the recreated songs were intended to preserve the emotional essence of the original soundtrack while reflecting their enduring connection with audiences. A teaser for the new version of "Tera Mera Rishta" was unveiled on 29 July 2026.

The film also features a song titled "Yeh Awarapan", sung by Arijit Singh. According to Amaal Mallik, the song underwent multiple revisions before reaching its final form. Singh had announced his retirement from playback singing in January 2026. Following the song's release, reports speculated that Singh had returned to playback singing. Further speculation arose after Mallik stated in a post on X that Singh had agreed to sing the track only a week before its release; Singh's team, however, denied that the song marked his return to playback singing and clarified that he was fulfilling commitments made before his retirement.

The film also features a song titled "Piya Ghar Aaya – Homecoming", composed and sung by Akhil Sachdeva. Sachdeva revealed that Emraan Hashmi had personally approached him for the song and asked him to create something different from his previous work.

== Release ==
The first single, "Ve Junoon", composed by Mithoon, written by Sayeed Quadri and sung by Subodhh Sharma, was released on 7 July 2026. The second single, "Yeh Awarapan", composed by Amaal Mallik, written by Rashmi Virag and sung by Arijit Singh, was released on 21 July 2026. The third single, "Tera Mera Rishta Continues", composed by Mithoon, written by Sayeed Quadri and sung by Saaj Bhatt and Subodhh Sharma was released on 6 August 2026.

== Reception ==
The track "Ve Junoon" drew attention for its similarities to "Saiyaara", the title track of the 2025 film of the same name, and received mixed response. The song debuted at number 10 on the Mirchi Top 20 chart. The song "Yeh Awarapan" drew criticism amid comparisons with the 2007 original soundtrack and received a mixed-to-lukewarm response following its release. The track "Tera Mera Rishta Continues" attracted significant attention online, garnering over 3 million views on YouTube within days of release.

== Track listing ==
Track listing
No.	Title	Lyrics	Music	Singer(s)	Length
1.	"Ve Junoon"	Sayeed Quadri	Mithoon	Subodhh Sharma	6:42
2.	"Yeh Awarapan"	Rashmi Virag	Amaal Mallik	Arijit Singh	4:58
3.	"Tera Mera Rishta - New Version"	Sayeed Quadri	Mithoon	Saaj Bhatt, Subodhh Sharma	6:05
4.	"Tumhare Liye"	Sachin Urmtosh	Wasif Ahmad	Shreya Ghoshal	3:49
5.	"Toh Phir Aao - New Version"	Sayeed Quadri	Mithoon	Subodhh Sharma	4:51
6.	"Piya Ghar Aaya - Homecoming"	Akhil Sachdeva	Akhil Sachdeva	Akhil Sachdeva	3:09
7.	"Laado"	Rashmi Virag	Jeet Gannguli	Jubin Nautiyal	4:38
8.	"Tera Mera Rishta Continues"	Sayeed Quadri	Mithoon	Saaj Bhatt, Subodhh Sharma	3:35
9.	"Tumhare Liye - Duet"	Sachin Urmtosh	Wasif Ahmad	Shreya Ghoshal, Aaryam	3:49
10.	"Piya Ghar Aaya - Homecoming (Film Version)"	Akhil Sachdeva	Akhil Sachdeva	Akhil Sachdeva	4:06
11.	"Yeh Awarapan" (Amaal Mallik Version)	Rashmi Virag	Amaal Mallik	Amaal Mallik	4:58
12.	"Tumhare Liye (Male Version)"	Sachin Urmtosh	Wasif Ahmad	Aaryam	3:30
Total length:					54:10
