= Bhuvnesh Mann =

Indian television actor (born 1988)

- Born: 3 January 1988 (age 38); Jammu, India
- Occupation: Actor
- Years active: 2007 - present
- Notable work: Ek Hasina Thi (TV series) (2014) Dahhej (2007) Maayke Se Bandhi Dor (2011)

Bhuvnesh Mann is an Indian television actor from Delhi, India. He appeared in the television show Dahhej as Soham mehta on NDTV Imagine. After Dahhej he played the role of Arjun in the television show Dehleez on NDTV Imagine and did many modeling assignments apart from featuring in advertisements and music videos. He also played the role of Dev Goenka in the Indian television soap opera show Ek Hasina Thi in 2014.

== Television ==
- 2007 - Dahhej as Soham Mehta (Main role)
- 2007 - Kahaani Ghar Ghar Kii as Ankit
- 2007 - Ssshhhh...Phir Koi Hai (Episode 55: Karkhana) as Shahid
- 2007 - Ssshhhh...Phir Koi Hai (Episode 58-59: Souten) as Ranveer
- 2009 - Dehleez as Arjun
- 2011 - Maayke Se Bandhi Dor as Kartik
- 2012 - Haunted Nights (Episode: Aakhri Khwahish) as Sunil
- 2014 - Ek Hasina Thi as Dev Goenka (Main role)
- 2016 - Darr Sabko Lagta Hai (episode twenty-eight) as Raj

== Filmography ==
- 2019 War as Ship Helmsman
- 2017 Dil Jo Na Keh Saka as Chef Kabir
