= Aachari Baa =

Indian Hindi-language film

- Promotional release poster
- Directed by: Hardik Gajjar
- Written by: Shreyes Anil Lowlekar
- Produced by: Jyoti Deshpande; Parth Gajjar; Poonam Shroff
- Starring: Neena Gupta; Kabir Bedi; Vatsal Sheth
- Cinematography: Hrishikesh Gandhi
- Edited by: Kanu Prajapati
- Production companies: Jio Studios; Hardik Gajjar Films; Backbencher Pictures
- Distributed by: JioHotstar
- Release date: 14 March 2025
- Country: India
- Language: Hindi

Aachari Baa is a 2025 Indian Hindi-language family drama film directed by Hardik Gajjar and produced by Jio Studios in association with Hardik Gajjar Films and Backbencher Pictures. The film stars Neena Gupta, Kabir Bedi, and Vatsal Sheth, and it premiered on the streaming platform JioHotstar on 14 March 2025. It is a remake of the 2023 Tamil movie Appatha.

== Plot ==
Jaishnavi (Neena Gupta) is a 65-year-old widow who earns a living making homemade pickles in a small town in Gujarat. After many years of estrangement, her son Ketan (Vatsal Sheth), who lives in Mumbai, invites her to stay at his home. Upon arriving, she discovers that her son and his family are leaving for a vacation in Darjeeling, leaving her to care for their pet dog, Jenny.

Initially overwhelmed by the responsibility and city life, Jaishnavi gradually bonds with Jenny and the residents of the apartment complex. An incident occurs when she accidentally feeds Jenny pickles and chocolate, causing the dog to fall ill. Brijesh Malhotra (Kabir Bedi), the society secretary, helps her find a veterinarian. The apartment residents discover her culinary talent and rally around her, forming new bonds and offering her a sense of purpose. When her family returns, Jaishnavi has formed a deeper connection with the community and rediscovered her confidence.

== Cast ==
- Neena Gupta as Jaishnavi (Jaishnaviben Anopchand Vagadia)
- Kabir Bedi as Brijesh Malhotra
- Vatsal Sheth as Ketan
- Vandana Pathak as Sharda
- Manasi Rachh as Manorama
- Apoorva Arora as Dhanashree
- Shah Bhavya as Harsh
- Sudipta Deb as Anchor
- Vaishnavi Ganatra as Bilva
- Maulik Nayak
- Pyarali Nayani as Food contest judge
- Atharva Sharma as Kaushal
- Vatsal Sheth as Ketan
- Gopal Singh as Mukesh mishra

== Release ==
Aachari Baa was released on 14 March 2025 on JioHotstar.

== Reception ==
The film received mixed reviews from critics. The Times of India rated it 2.5 out of 5 stars, noting that while the film touches on themes such as parental neglect and women's emancipation, its storytelling was predictable and lacked emotional depth. Abhi Singhal of Daily Pioneer rated it 3.5 out of 5 stars, noting "Aachari Baa is more than just a film-it is an experience that tugs at the heartstrings. It beautifully conveys themes of self-worth, loneliness, and unexpected companionship, making it a must-watch for audiences of all ages."
