= Ek Hasina Thi (TV series) =

Indian television series

- Genre: Suspense thriller Crime drama Mystery
- Created by: Cinevistaas Limited
- Written by: Sameer Arora; Dialogue; Satyam Tripathy Aparna Nadig
- Creative director: Siddharth Priyadarshi
- Starring: Sanjeeda Sheikh; Vatsal Sheth; Bhuvnesh Mann; Simone Singh
- Opening theme: "Ek Hasina Thi" by Sunidhi Chauhan
- Composer: Raju Singh
- Country of origin: India
- Original language: Hindi
- No. of seasons: 1
- No. of episodes: 215

Production
- Producer: Prem Krishen
- Production locations: Kolkata(setting); Mumbai (filming)
- Camera setup: Multi-camera
- Running time: 20 minutes

Original release
- Network: StarPlus
- Release: 14 April – 20 December 2014

Ek Hasina Thi (transl: "There was a beautiful woman") is a Hindi crime thriller television series created by Cinevistaas Limited. It aired from 14 April 2014 to 20 December 2014 on StarPlus. Produced by Prem Krishen, the series starred Sanjeeda Sheikh, Vatsal Sheth, Bhuvnesh Mann and Simone Singh.

== Overview ==
The show revolves around Durga Thakur a beautiful, mysterious and enigmatic girl from the US and Shaurya Goenka a spoiled brat of Kolkata's most rich, powerful and influential family the Goenkas. Durga and her father the rich and famous cancer specialist Dr. Dayal Thakur arrive in Kolkata to open Asia's biggest cancer research center in Kolkata. This attracts the attention of the Goenka's, headed by Rajanath Goenka, his wife the beautiful and very vicious Sakshi Goenka. As Rajanath plans to enter politics in the future he believes that the cancer research project would improve his image socially.

Durga meets Shourya and his family at a Durga Pooja and Shaurya as his nature gets infatuated by Durga in the first sight. Rajanth is also impressed by Durga but Sakshi feels weird and senses danger. It is then revealed that Durga has come to the city to get revenge on Shaurya and bring justice to Payal Mithra, who was raped by Shaurya Goenka 2 years ago. But the Goenkas using their power and money turned the case around and Shaurya was acquitted innocent.

Shaurya places a bet with his friends Karan the son of a power political leader, Tarun the son of a famous director and Rishi that he will make Durga fall for him and sleep with her. All these 4 are involved in the rape case 2 years ago. From then, Shaurya tried in multiple ways to impress Durga and make her fall for him. But Durga aware of Shaurya's true intentions and nature befriends him but does not allow him near her.

As things progress, Durga one by one destroys the support system of the Goenkas that is the people who helped them and lied during Payal's case. She initially targets Naveen Mathur, right hand of the Goenkas and frames him that he is helping Chowdary the rival of Goenkas. Sakshi and Rajanth believe it and throw him behind the bars. Sakshi who believes Durga is danger from the start grows increasingly cautious and unaeasy about Durga. She also warns Shaurya to stay away from Durga multiple times, but Shaurya doesn't pay heed due to his ego and the bet.

As things unfold it is revealed that Durga is none other than Nithya Mithra, Payal's elder sister who filed the case 2 years ago and stood against the Goenka's. After Shaurya was acquitted, Sakshi sends some goons to kill her but she meets with an accident and falls off a slope. The car was driven by Dr. Dayal and he saves her and gives her his daughter Durga's face who was dead, after plastic surgery as Nithya's was completely disfigured during the accident. Nithya then narrates her story and Dayal decided to help her. Thus arriving in Kolkata after 2 years secretly and precisely planning everything. Shaurya unaware of all this pursues Durga irrespective of his mother's warnings.

Then enters Dev Goenka, the elder brother of Shaurya and the son of Suchithra and Arnab Goenka Rajantj's elder brother. Dev is a simple and humble guy who follows his father's footsteps and is madly in love with Nithya. Dev, Nithya and Payal were childhood friends. Dev returns from the US after 2 years and yearns to confess his love to Nithya but is informed that she died 2 years ago.

== Cast ==
=== Main ===
- Sanjeeda Sheikh in a double role as
  - Durga Goenka (née Thakur): Dayal's adoptive daughter; Dev's wife; Arnav and Suchitra's daughter-in-law(2014)
  - Nitya Goenka (née Mitra): Mansi's daughter; Payal's sister; Dev's wife; Arnav and Suchitra's daughter-in-law (2014) (after plastic surgery)
    - Aditi Sajwan as Nitya Mitra (2014) (before plastic surgery)
- Vatsal Sheth as Shaurya Goenka: Rajnath and Sakshi's son; Arnav and Suchitra's nephew; Dev's cousin
- Bhuvnesh Mann as Dev Goenka: Arnav and Suchitra's son; Rajnath and Sakshi's nephew; Shaurya's cousin; Durga's (Nitya's) husband (2014)
- Simone Singh as Sakshi Goenka: Rehmat's ex-wife; Rajnath's wife; Shaurya's mother; Durga's mother-in-law (2014)
  - Anchal Sahu as a young Sakshi (2014)
- Ayub Khan as Rajnath Goenka: Arnav's brother; Sakshi's second husband; Shaurya's father; Durga's father-in-law (2014)

=== Recurring ===
- Kamalika Guha Thakurta as Mansi Mitra – Nitya's and Payal's mother. (2014)
- Teena Chopra as Payal Mitra – Mansi's younger daughter; Dayal's adoptive daughter; Nitya's sister (2014)
- Kishwer Merchant as Raima Maheshwari – Sakshi's best friend(2014)
- Unknown as Arnav Goenka - Rajnath's brother; Suchitra's husband; Dev's father . He was a kind man who was shot and killed by Rajnath so he could not be exposed for his scam (2014)
- Jyoti Gauba as Suchitra Goenka – Arnav's widow; Dev's mother. She is a kind-hearted person and believes in social work (2014).
- Poonampreet Bhatia as Kangana Goenka – Sakshi and Rajnath's daughter; Shaurya's sister.(2014)
- Mihir Mishra as Akram Khan – Rehmat's son; Sakshi's step-son.(2014)
- Vicky Arora as Karan Basu – Girish's son; Shaurya's best friend and culprit of Payal (2014)
- Ravjeet Singh / Vikram Singh Chauhan as Rishi Zaveri – Shaurya's former friend turned into enemy due to Payals protection. (2014)
- Aliraza Namdar as Girish Basu – Karan's father. (2014)
- Bhupinder Singh as Dr. Dayal Thakur – Durga's father; Nitya's adoptive father. (2014)
- Amit Behl as Navin Mathur – Goenkas' former employee. (2014)
- Aamir Ali as Dr. Neil Bhattacharyya – Durga's fake groom.(2014)
- Vicky Arora as Karan Basu – Shaurya's friend. (2014)
- Shalmalee Desai as Sagarika Ganguly (2014)

• Muheet Khan as Dr. Amit

=== Cameo ===
- Sohail Khan to promote Jai Ho (2014)

== Production ==
The show is set in Kolkata, but is filmed in Mumbai. The series was titled while in pre-production as Daag but title Ek Hasina Thi was finalized.

The series production began in 2013 and was supposed to go on air in the same year but was delayed and premiered on 14 April 2014.

== Reception ==
=== Critics ===
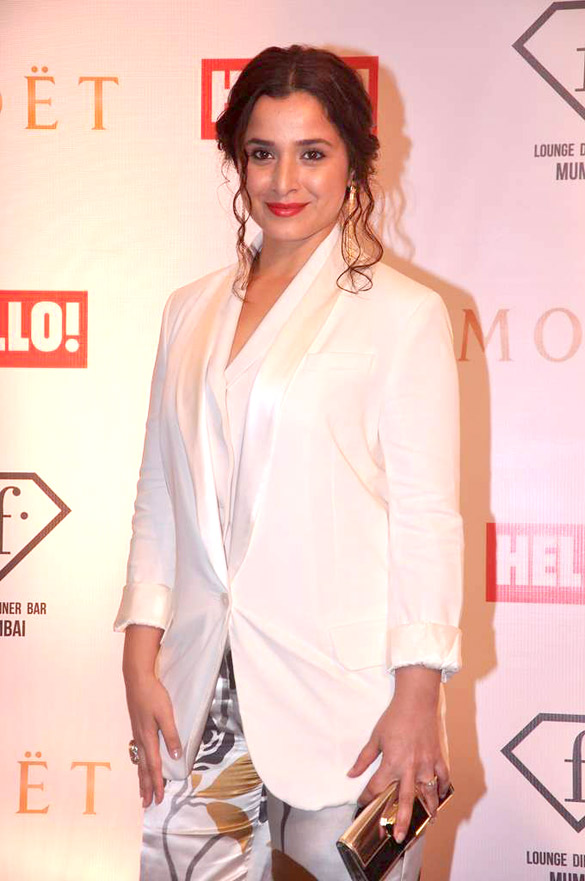
Among the cast members, Singh's portrayal of Sakshi Goenka has been well appreciated. A review carried by The Indian Express noted that "her attitude and elegance comes across distinctly in her character".

Mid-Day stated, "Ek Hasina Thi had a great start. However, despite a good plotline, impressive star cast (Simone Singh, Ayub Khan and Sanjeeda Shaikh and Vatsal Seth) and many awards, it failed to keep up with the initial pace and lost out on viewers."

The Indian Express stated the series to be more convincing and said, "The USP of the show is the fast-paced, gripping storyline and the immensely-talented star cast. But the characters seem edgy most of the time which doesn’t look very convincing and the performance of the lead actors is not standing out as yet. The most interesting and powerful performance is by Simone Singh. Her attitude and elegance comes across distinctly in her character of Sakshi Goenka. Like Singh’s, Ayub Khan's role too is well-sketched and projected with ease. The show is well-scripted and has the ability to make a mark but the fact remains that the lead actors will have to put in a lot of effort to make their characters look convincing and believable. The settings, makeup and clothes are the main highlights and strong base of the show."

Daily News and Analysis rated two and half stars and praised, "The storyline is gripping, fast-paced and slick. It's nice to see a bunch of good looking actors together. The setting in Kolkata, the ambience, the bungalows, the visuals etc speak of high production values. The serial, in short, is easy on the eye." On the other hand, they also said, "All the characters seem to be on edge, which is annoying. Nobody seems to be what they are. More importantly, whether the serial works or not is completely dependent on the actors' performances, especially since it's not a linear story. And so far, they are falling short." Speaking on cast performance they said, Beautiful and sophisticated Simone plays the shrewd and manipulative Sakshi Goenka with elan. Sanjeeda's character is layered, but it's not coming through in her performance. Even Vatsal lacks the edginess both in terms of looks and performance."

Deccan Chronicle criticised, "It’s a tried and tested plot but one that still holds a lot of potential. But the problem here is that there is no thrill in this thriller. Ek Hasina Thi follows the silly, repetitive style of saas-bahu (mother in law-daughter in law) serials, and every teeny-weeny thing gets dragged for a week, making the eventual revenge very tiresome."

== Awards ==
Indian Telly Awards 2014

- Best Actress in a Negative Role - Simone Singh (Note: Tied with Ashwini Kalsekar for Jodha Akbar.)

Indian Television Academy Awards 2014

- Best Series - Drama - Ek Hasina Thi
- Best Actor in a Negative Role - Ayub Khan (Rajnath Goyanka)
- Best Actress in a Negative Role - Simone Singh (Sakshi Goyanka)
- Gr8! Performer of the Year (Female) - Sanjeeda Sheikh (Durga Thakur)
- Nominated for Best Actor (Male) - Vatsal Sheth(Shaurya Goyanka)
