= Kya Dill Mein Hai =

- Genre: Drama
- Developed by: Ekta Kapoor
- Written by: Salil Sand; Patima Rangila
- Directed by: Garry Bhinder; Santosh Bhatt; Manesh Om Singhania
- Creative directors: Nivedita Basu; Tanushree Dasgupta
- Starring: See below
- Theme music composer: Nawaab Arzoo and Lalit Sen
- Opening theme: "Kya Dill Mein Hai" by Pamela Jain
- Country of origin: India
- Original language: Hindi
- No. of seasons: 1
- No. of episodes: 98

Production
- Producers: Shobha Kapoor; Ekta Kapoor
- Editor: Ravi Bhushan
- Camera setup: Multi-camera
- Running time: Approx. 48 minutes
- Production company: Balaji Telefilms

Original release
- Network: 9X
- Release: 1 December 2007 – 8 November 2008

Kya Dill Mein Hai (transl. What's inside the heart) is a Hindi language Indian drama television series which premiered on 1 December 2007 on 9X. The series stars Aamir Ali, Sanjeeda Sheikh and Abigail Jain.

== Plot ==
The story centers around the life of an 18-year-old girl, Kakun, who marries the man of her dreams, Anurag, against her parents' wishes. She faces challenges to her goal. The entry of the advocate Naina Oberoi and how Rahul (Anurag's real name) falls for Naina and incidents that happen after that.

== Cast ==
- Aamir Ali as Rahul Punj / Anurag
- Abigail Jain as Kakoon Rahul Punj
- Sanjeeda Sheikh as Advocate Naina Oberoi
- Kratika Sengar as Naina Mann, Dinesh and Devi's daughter
- Krystle D'Souza as Tamanna Punj
- Anita Hassanandani as Tapur
- Papiya Sengupta as mother of Kakoon and Naina
- Deepak Qazir Kejriwal as Ghosh Babu
- Anand Suryavanshi as Aniket
- Sandeep Rajora as Siddharth Punj
