= Vatsal Sheth =

Indian actor, model and entrepreneur

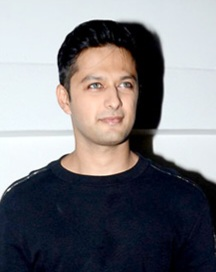
- Sheth in 2015
- Born: 5 August 1980 (age 46); Mumbai, Maharashtra, India
- Occupations: Actor; model; entrepreneur
- Years active: 1996–present
- Known for: Just Mohabbat; Taarzan: The Wonder Car
- Spouse: Ishita Dutta (m. 2017)
- Website: YouTube Channel

Vatsal Sheth (born 5 August 1980) is an Indian actor, model and entrepreneur. He has acted in many Indian television shows and numerous Hindi films, and is known for his portrayal of Raj Chaudhary in the 2004 film Taarzan: The Wonder Car, Shaurya Goenka in the 2014 thriller series Ek Hasina Thi, and Kabir Raichand in the 2017 love-saga series Haasil.

== Life and family ==
Sheth was born on 5 August 1980 in Mumbai to Gujarati parents. He is the elder of the two siblings.

He studied at Utpal Shanghvi Global School, did his Junior College at Gokalibai Punamchand Pitambar High School, Vile Parle and received his degree in mathematics from Mithibai College, Vile Parle. He also wrote a few games in GW-BASIC and Pascal. He intended to become a software engineer which he later dropped after receiving his first significant role as Jai in Just Mohabbat.

Sheth is a vegetarian. He is a fitness enthusiast and follows teetotalism. He is a part of the Celebrity Cricket Team Mumbai Heroes. He also plays badminton and supports Mumbai Magicians in the Indian Badminton League.

== Personal life ==
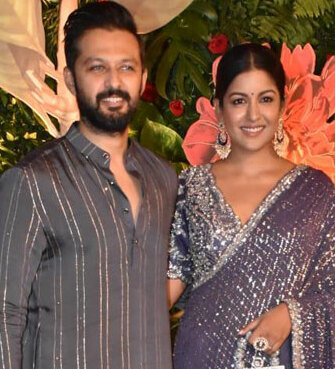
Sheth with wife Ishita Dutta in 2022

Sheth met actress Ishita Dutta on the sets of their show Rishton Ka Saudagar - Baazigar in 2016. Sheth married Dutta on 28 November 2017 in Mumbai. In March 2023, the couple announced their pregnancy and had a baby boy on 19 July 2023. The couple had a baby girl on June 10, 2025.

== Career ==
In Just Mohabbat, Sheth portrayed the role of Jai through his teenage years. In 2003, director duo Abbas–Mustan announced their film Taarzan: The Wonder Car with Sheth playing the character Raj Choudary. In 2007, Sheth appeared as Vikram Singh/ Older Jaisalmer in Nanhe Jaisalmer. A year later he starred in Heroes as Ali . In the same year he appeared in a cameo for Disney’s The Cheetah Girls: One World. In 2009, he was part of the star-cast in Paying Guests produced by Subhash Ghai. In 2011, Vatsal played Karan in Hostel. He had a cameo role in Jai Ho. In 2014 Vatsal returned to television in a grey role of Shaurya Goenka in Ek Hasina Thi. In 2017, he was cast as a lead character Kabir Raichand on the thriller tv series Haasil On 25 January 2018, he won an award for Haasil at the Lions Gold Awards. In December 2019, he appeared as Nishant Maheshwari in the StarPlus daily soap opera Yeh Rishtey Hain Pyaar Ke. In 2020 he appeared as Aswathamma in RadhaKrishna.

== Media ==
Vatsal Sheth was ranked in The Times Most Desirable Men at No. 36 in 2020.

== Filmography ==
=== Films ===
Year	Title	Role	Language	Notes	Ref.
2004	Taarzan: The Wonder Car	Raj Chaudhary	Hindi		
2007	Nanhe Jaisalmer	Vikram Singh / Older Nanhe	Hindi		
2008	The Cheetah Girls: One World	Sunny Singh	English		
2008	Heroes	Ali Nawab Sahab Shah	Hindi		
2008	U Me Aur Hum	—N/a	Hindi	Executive producer	
2009	Paying Guests	Jayesh Takhur	Hindi		
2010	Toh Baat Pakki!	Yuvvraaj Saxena	Hindi		
2011	Hostel	Karan	Hindi		
2012	Uncoupled	Shaan	Hindi	Short film	
2013	Season's Greetings	Sam	Hindi		
2014	Jai Ho	Harjeet	Hindi		
2016	Final Cut of Director	Nitish Kumar	Hindi, Tamil	Bilingual film	
2020	Malang	Victor Ferns	Hindi		
2020	Kahaa Toh Tha	Aabir	Hindi	Short film	
2020	Meri Pehli Bike	Aditya	Hindi	Short film	
2023	Adipurush	Indrajit	Telugu, Hindi	Bilingual film	
2025	Aachari Baa	Ketan Vagadia	Hindi		
2025	Surprise	Parth Desai	Gujarati		
2026	Firki		Gujarati		
2026	Kanyadaan	Punit	Hindi	Short film	

=== Television ===
Year	Title	Role	Notes	Ref.
1996–2000	Just Mohabbat	Jai Malhotra		
2010	Taarak Mehta Ka Ooltah Chashmah	Himself	Guest appearance	
2014	Ek Hasina Thi	Shaurya Goenka		
2015	Naach Meri Jaan	Judge		
2016	Rishton Ka Saudagar - Baazigar	Aarav Trivedi		
2017	Gehraiyaan	Sahil Arora		
2017–2018	Haasil	Kabir Raichand		
2018	Kaun Hai?	Yatin Choudhary	Season 2	
2018	Bepannah	Himself	Special appearance	
2019–2020	Yeh Rishtey Hain Pyaar Ke	Nishant "Nannu" Maheshwari		
2023	Naagin 6	Raghav		
2023	Titli	Rahul	Cameo appearance	

=== Web series ===
Year	Title	Role	Ref.
2021	Crime Next Door	Amit	
2025	Andhera	Darius	

=== Music videos ===
Year	Title	Singer	Ref.
2020	Be Strong	Jasbir Jassi	
2020	Jis Din Tum	Soham Naik	
2020	Rehne Do Zara	Soham Naik	
2020	Kithe	Vishal Mishra	
2022	Kuch Tumhara Kuch Hamara	Soham Naik	
2022	AASMAN	Rupinn Pahwa	
