= Akhil Sachdeva =

Indian musician, singer and composer

- Born: Delhi, India
- Genres: Indian pop; Sufi rock
- Occupations: Singer; music composer
- Years active: 2009–present

Akhil Sachdeva is an Indian singer and music composer.

== Career ==
Sachdeva is the lead vocalist of the Delhi-based music band, Nasha.

== Discography ==
=== Film ===
| Year | Film | Song | Singer(s) | Composer(s) | Writer(s) |
|---|---|---|---|---|---|
| 2017 | Badrinath Ki Dulhania | "Sun Mere Humsafar" | Akhil Sachdeva, Mansheel Gujral | Akhil Sachdeva | |
| 2017 | Badrinath Ki Dulhania | "Humsafar (Reprise)" | Alia Bhatt, Akhil Sachdeva | Akhil Sachdeva | |
| 2018 | Badhaai Ho | "Nain Na Jodeen (2nd Version)" | Akhil Sachdeva | Rochak Kohli | Kumaar |
| 2019 | Kabir Singh | "Tera Ban Jaunga" | Akhil Sachdeva, Tulsi Kumar | Akhil Sachdeva | Kumaar |
| 2019 | Kabir Singh | "Tera Ban Jaungi" | Tulsi Kumar | Akhil Sachdeva | Kumaar |
| 2019 | Kabir Singh | "Tera Ban Jaunga (Reprise)" | Akhil Sachdeva | Akhil Sachdeva | Kumaar |
| 2020 | Jawaani Jaaneman | "Mere Babula (Madhaniya)" | Harshdeep Kaur, Akhil Sachdeva | Gourav-Roshin | Shellee |
| 2020 | Bhoot - Part One: The Haunted Ship | "Channa Ve" | Akhil Sachdeva, Mansheel Gujral | Akhil Sachdeva | |
| 2023 | Chhatriwali | "Main Teri Hi Rahoon" | Akhil Sachdeva, Shirley Setia | Akhil Sachdeva | |
| 2024 | The Sabarmati Report | "Tere Mere Darmiyan" | Akhil Sachdeva | | |
| 2026 | Awarapan 2 | "Piya Ghar Aaya - Homecoming" | Akhil Sachdeva | | |
| TBA | Suswagatam Khushaamadeed | TBA | Akhil Sachdeva | | |

=== Singles ===
| Year | Album | Title | Singer(s) | Composer(s) | Writer(s) | Notes |
|---|---|---|---|---|---|---|
| 2018 | Gal Sun | "Gal Sun" Single | Akhil Sachdeva | | Manoj Muntashir, Akhil Sachdeva | |

=== Albums ===
| Year | Album | Song(s) | Singer(s) | Composer(s) | Writer(s) |
|---|---|---|---|---|---|
| 2018 | T-Series Mixtape Punjabi | "Dil Taan Pagal / Je Tu Na" | Akhil Sachdeva, Amber Vashisht | Abhijit Vaghani, Jaidev Kumar, Gold Boy | Babbu Maan |
| 2019 | T-Series Mixtape Season 2 | "Chan Kitthan / Mere Sohneya | Akhil Sachdeva, Kaur B | | |
| 2019 | T-Series Mixtape Season 2 | "Aaoge Jab Tum / Jag Soona Soona | Akhil Sachdeva, Nandini Srikar | Abhijit Vaghani, Sandesh Shandilya, Vishal-Shekhar | |

=== Web series ===
| Year | Title | Song | Singer(s) | Composer(s) | Writer(s) |
|---|---|---|---|---|---|
| 2019 | Broken But Beautiful Season 2 | "O Saajna" | Akhil Sachdeva | Akhil Sachdeva | |
| 2020 | It Happened in Calcutta | "Sukoon" | Akhil Sachdeva | Akhil Sachdeva | |
| 2020 | It Happened in Calcutta | "Dua Ban Ja" | Akhil Sachdeva, Harshdeep Kaur | Akhil Sachdeva | |
| 2020 | Dil Hi Toh Hai Season 3 | "Rondi Ankhiyaan" | Akhil Sachdeva, Lisa Mishra | Akhil Sachdeva | |
| 2020 | Bebaakee | "Galliyan" | Akhil Sachdeva, Asees Kaur | Akhil Sachdeva | |
| 2021 | Broken But Beautiful Season 3 | "Mere Liye" | Akhil Sachdeva | | |
| 2021 | Broken But Beautiful Season 3 | "Tere Naal" | Akhil Sachdeva | | |

== Awards and nominations ==
=== Won ===
2017

- Zee Cine Award for Best Playback Singer – Male - "Humsafar" (Badrinath Ki Dulhania)
- IIFA Award for Best Music Director - Badrinath Ki Dulhania

2019

- Screen Award for Best Music Director - Kabir Singh

2020

- Filmfare Award for Best Music Director - Kabir Singh
- Zee Cine Award for Best Music Director - Kabir Singh

2021

- IIFA Award for Best Music Director - Kabir Singh

=== Nominated ===
2018

- Filmfare Award for Best Male Playback Singer - "Humsafar" (Badrinath Ki Dulhania)
- Filmfare Award for Best Music Director - Badrinath Ki Dulhania
- Zee Cine Award for Best Lyricist - "Humsafar" (Badrinath Ki Dulhania)
- Zee Cine Award for Best Music Director - Badrinath Ki Dulhania
