= Siddharth P. Malhotra =

Indian film director

- Occupation: Film director
- Father: Prem Krishen
- Relatives: Prem Nath (Paternal Grandfather); Rajendra Nath (Paternal Grand-uncle); Narendra Nath (Paternal Grand-uncle)

Siddharth P. Malhotra is an Indian film director who works in Hindi cinema. He has directed the films We Are Family (2010), Hichki (2018), Maharaj (2024), and Ikka (2026).

== Early life ==
Siddharth is the son of actor-turned-producer Prem Krishen and grandson of former actors Bina Rai and Prem Nath who was the brother-in-law of Raj Kapoor.

== Filmography ==
Key
†	Denotes films that have not yet been released

Year	Film	Ref
2010	We Are Family	
2018	Hichki	
2024	Maharaj	
2026	Ikka	
TBA	Kamal Aur Meena †	
