= Anushka Ranjan =

Indian actress

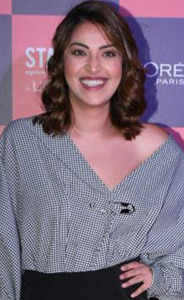
- Ranjan in 2023
- Born: 1990 or 1991 (age 35–36); Mumbai, Maharashtra, India
- Occupations: Film actress; model
- Years active: 2015–present
- Spouse: Aditya Seal (m. 2021)
- Children: 2
- Relatives: Akansha Ranjan Kapoor (sister)

Anushka Ranjan is an Indian actress and model. She has modelled for designers like Manish Malhotra, Vikram Phadnis, Neeta Lulla, Pria Kataris Puri, Babita Malkani, Amy Billimoria and many others. She was the Brand Ambassador for a jewellery brand known as "Varuna D'Jani".

== Early life and background ==
She was born in Mumbai to Shashi Ranjan, an actor/director from FTII and the Publisher of GR8 Magazine and Anu Ranjan, the Founder of The Indian Television Academy. Her younger sister is actress Akansha Ranjan Kapoor.

Anushka did her schooling from Jamnabai Narsee School, a 2-year acting diploma from Whistling Woods International and a 1-year performing arts course from The ITA School of Performing Arts, followed by a 3-month course from Anupam Kher School of acting, and theater with Nadira Babbar. She has trained in Kathak under the supervision of Guruji Viru Krishna.

== Personal life ==
On 21 November 2021, Ranjan tied the knot with her longtime boyfriend, actor Aditya Seal, in Mumbai.

== Philanthropy ==
Anushka acts as the spokesmodel for her mother Anu Ranjan's NGO, BETI.

== Acting ==
She made her debut in Hindi Cinema with the Romantic Comedy, Wedding Pullav, in October 2015, directed by ace cinematographer Binod Pradhan. She had a friendly appearance in Batti Gul Meter Chalu starring Shahid Kapoor and directed by Shree Narayan Singh.

In 2020, she starred in AltBalaji's Fittrat as Amy opposite Krystle D'Souza and Aditya Seal.

== Filmography ==
=== Films ===
Year	Title	Role	Notes	Ref.
2015	Wedding Pullav	Anushka		
2018	Batti Gul Meter Chalu	Rita		
2019	Gulabi Lens	Suman	Short film	

=== Web series ===
Year	Title	Role	Ref.
2019	Fittrat	Amrita "Amy" Sareen	

=== Music videos ===
Year	Title	Singer	Ref.
2021	Meri Zindagi Mein	Amit Mishra	

== Awards and nominations ==
Year	Award	Category	Work	Result
2015	BIG Star Entertainment Awards	Best Actor Debut (Female)	Wedding Pullav	Nominated
2015	Stardust Awards	Best Acting Debut (Female)	Wedding Pullav	Nominated
