= Aditya Seal =

Indian actor (born 1988)

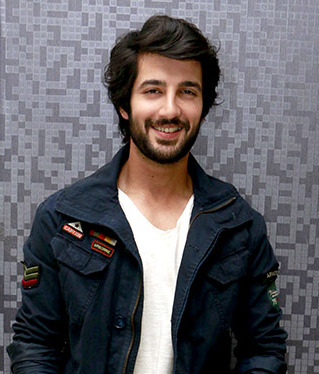
- Seal in 2016
- Born: 22 March 1988 (age 38); Mumbai, Maharashtra, India
- Occupation: Actor
- Years active: 2002–present
- Spouse: Anushka Ranjan (m. 2021)
- Children: 2
- Parent: Manju Seal
- Relatives: Akansha Ranjan Kapoor (sister-in-law)

Aditya Seal (Bengali pronunciation: [aditːo ʃil]) is an Indian actor who predominantly works in Hindi films and series. He made his film debut as a teenager with the erotic film Ek Chhotisi Love Story (2002), opposite Manisha Koirala. As an adult, he starred in the romantic drama film Tum Bin II (2016) and had a supporting role in the teen film Student of the Year 2 (2019). He has since starred in the streaming series Fittrat (2019) and The Empire (2021), and the film Khel Khel Mein (2024).

== Early and personal life ==
Aditya Seal was born in Mumbai to a Bengali father and a Punjabi mother. He attended Chatrabhuj Narsee Memorial School. Seal is a former taekwondo champion, he is a black belt in taekwondo. He also practices gymnastics and martial arts. His father produced and acted in a Garhwali film, but Seal wanted to be a professional cricketer, before an injury aborted the option, so he followed his father's footsteps.

On 21 November 2021, Seal married his longtime girlfriend actress Anushka Ranjan in Mumbai.

== Career ==
Seal made his film debut with Ek Chhotisi Love Story, where he played a teenager voyeur opposite Manisha Koirala. The story revolved around a teenager who becomes secretly obsessed with his neighbor. He also starred in movie We R Friends in 2006. In Purani Jeans, he played the role of Samuel Lawrence. In 2016, Seal was seen in Anubhav Sinha's Tum Bin II as Shekhar opposite Neha Sharma.

In 2019, he played Manav Randhawa in Student of the Year 2. Next, he portrayed Veer Shergill in Alt Balaji's web series Fittrat opposite Krystle D'Souza, for which he received many accolades.

He was ranked in The Times Most Desirable Men at No. 34 in 2019, and at No. 35 in 2020.

In 2020, he played Samar in Indoo Ki Jawani, a dramedy revolving around a girl's adventures with a dating app. The movie was theatrically released on 11 December 2020 amid the 50% occupancy theatrical guideline owing to COVID-19 pandemic in India.

== Filmography ==
=== Films ===
Year	Title	Role	Notes	Ref.
2002	Ek Chhotisi Love Story	Aditya		
2006	We R Friends	Amit		
2007	Say Salaam India	Siddharth		
2014	Purani Jeans	Samuel Lawrence		
2016	Tum Bin II	Shekhar Malhotra		
2018	Namaste England	Samar "Sam" Singh Sandhu		
2019	Student of the Year 2	Manav Randhawa		
2020	Indoo Ki Jawani	Samar		
2021	99 Songs	Unnamed		
2022	Rocket Gang	Amarbir		
2024	Khel Khel Mein	Samar		
2024	Amar Prem Ki Prem Kahani	Prem		
2025	Mere Husband Ki Biwi	Rajveer		
2027	Maharagni: Queen of Queens			

=== Television ===
Year	Title	Role	Ref.
2019	Fittrat	Veer Shergill	
2020	Forbidden Love	Ishaan	
2021	The Empire	Humayun	

=== Music video appearances ===
Year	Title	Singer(s)	Ref.
2019	"Dancing Doll"	Jyotica Tangri	
2021	"Weekend Vibe"	Jubël, Desi Crew	
2021	"Meri Zindagi Mein"	Amit Mishra	
2021	"Mera Yaar"	Dhvani Bhanushali	
2022	"Mangta Hai Kya"	Aditya Narayan, Deeksha Toor	

== Awards and nominations ==
Year	Award	Category	Work	Result	Ref.
2020	Indian Television Academy Awards	Popular Actor – Web	Fittrat	Nominated	
2022	Indian Television Academy Awards	Popular Actor – Web	The Empire	Nominated	
