= The Island of Lost Girls =

Feminist Dystopian novel

- Author: Manjula Padmanabhan
- Language: English
- Genre: Science fiction, Dystopian fiction, Feminist speculative fiction
- Publisher: Hachette India
- Publication date: 20th July 2015 (First Edition); 15th January 2017 (Paperback reissue)
- Publication place: India
- ISBN: 978-9-351-95177-3
- Preceded by: Escape (2015)
- Followed by: Zone (official release date yet to be announced. Catalogued under Siyahi)

The Island of Lost Girls is a dystopian novel by Indian author and illustrator Manjula Padmanabhan, first published in 2015. Set in a future where female children have become a rare and highly commodified resource, the narrative follows a young protagonist named Meiji as she navigates a treacherous world of human trafficking and survival. A sequel to her earlier work Escape, the novel explores themes of gender politics, exploitation, and the endurance of the human spirit through a blend of speculative fiction and social commentary.

== Background and Context ==
The conception of the dystopian world portrayed in The Island of Lost Girls is rooted in the early 2000s, when global and local discourse celebrated the "Decade of the Women". The author, Manjula Padmanabhan, observed a sharp disconnect between this optimistic public rhetoric and the declining demographic reality of Indian women. She originally formulated the core premise of her dystopian series as a newspaper "middle" written from the perspective of the last surviving Indian woman... This conceptual seed, which highlighted the silent disappearance of daughters through female foeticide and systemic gender discrimination, was subsequently expanded into her 2008 novel Escape and its 2015 sequel, The Island of Lost Girls

Padmanabhan's peripatetic upbringing significantly shaped the cosmopolitan and postcolonial themes of her writing. Born in Delhi in 1953 to a diplomat in the Indian Foreign Service, she spent her formative childhood years in Sweden and Switzerland, followed by relocations to Pakistan, Iran, and Thailand. Before transitioning to novels, Padmanabhan established a reputation as a playwright, illustrator, and cartoonist. Her female comic character Suki, who first appeared in The Sunday Observer in 1982 and was revived in The Hindu's Business Line in 2015, explored gender dynamics, environmental degradation, and consumerism. Her play Harvest won the 1997 Onassis Prize for Theatre, solidifying her career-long focus on bioethics, global inequality, and the commodification of the human body. In The Island of Lost Girls, Padmanabhan shifts her focus from the regional confines of Escape to a global post-apocalyptic landscape. The novel was written over a four-year period starting in 2010, a process the author described as a slow, barefoot ascent up a wet hill. The text engages with real-world demographic crises, postcolonial anxieties, and the rise of reproductive technologies, positioning itself as a major contribution to the

speculative canon.

== Plot ==
The backstory of The Island of Lost Girls begins twenty-two years after the formation of the "Forbidden Country" in the previous novel, Escape. In this near-future setting, a military dictatorship of cloned generals has achieved total reproductive autonomy through automated ectogenesis, leading to the systematic extermination of the region's female population, whom the rulers classify as "vermin". Complicit families surrendered their daughters for public execution in exchange for political favors and "droneries"—biotechnology centers that manufacture "drones," a sub-human, nonverbal clone labor force engineered to be non-rebellious.

Meiji, the only intact female to survive the genocide, was raised in absolute isolation by three brothers—Eldest, Middle, and Youngest—who chemically halted her physical development to hide her existence. To ensure her survival during puberty, they fitted Meiji with a synthetic penis to disguise her as male, a physical modification she subsequently associated with safety and survival. The narrative of the sequel unfolds in a global landscape devastated by nuclear and ecological collapse. Nuclear detonations at the mouth of the Suez Canal have turned the Red Sea into the "Poisoned Sea," and the countries of the world have reorganized into enclaves under the Whole World Union. At the center of this new global order is "The Zone," an arena funded by global powers for televised war games where refugee women and children are treated as expendable booty and trophies.

To protect Meiji, Youngest negotiates a deal with the unnamed General of the Brotherland. Youngest has been forced to undergo gender reassignment surgery to satisfy the General's perversions, leaving him with a masculine consciousness trapped in a surgically modified female exterior named Yasmine. To ensure Youngest executes his mission to infiltrate and spy on the "Island"—a hidden underwater sanctuary for abused girls—the General fits Youngest and Meiji with high-tech tracking devices. These include satellite locators embedded with fatal neurotoxin sacs, a dental pain radio that delivers electric shocks, and a continuous radio link that records and transmits all conversations back to the General.

Upon reaching the Island, Meiji is separated from Youngest and placed inside an irregular, sea-green room that conforms closely to her physical proportions. Although her body recovers, she suffers from amnesia, her mind left restless and blank due to the Island's practice of partitioning and wiping the memories of trauma survivors. During her isolation, Meiji interacts with a responsive, tentacular light hanging from the ceiling. By pressing its tip, she projects a magnificent illusion of the night sky, which allows her to identify constellations like Orion, Cassiopeia, Sirius, and the Andromeda Galaxy, demonstrating that her cognitive capacity and spatial memory remain intact.

Meanwhile, the General's surveillance network collapses. Because the Island is an underwater facility shielded by advanced cloaking and signal-blocking technologies, the satellite locators on Youngest and Meiji lose their signal. When the General fails to detonate the lethal neurotoxin despite the communications breakdown, Youngest realizes the threat of instant death was a bluff. Free from fear, Youngest confesses his mission to Mentor Vane, who deactivates the spying devices. Youngest, alongside a "transie" travelling companion named Aila (who he met while he was on The Island), joins the Island's feminist leadership. The novel ends on an ambiguous note of resistance as the Mentors offer sanctuary to Youngest and Aila in exchange for strategic intelligence to aid the Island's upcoming military conflicts against the patriarchal forces operating in the Zone.

== Literary Connections ==
The title of the novel is identical to Jennifer McMahon's 2008 bestseller Island of Lost Girls, a contemporary thriller concerning missing children. While both works share dark, disturbing themes about endangered girls, their trajectories are completely different. Padmanabhan's novel is a speculative political allegory that focuses on the systemic, technological erasure of the female sex in a post-apocalyptic future.

Furthermore, the narrative contains distinct references to South Asian literature and postcolonial history. For instance, during Meiji and Youngest's journey through the desolate enclaves, they meet a forlorn stationmaster waiting at a defunct railway station. This scene is a direct literary reference to the stationmaster in Arun Kolatkar's celebrated poetry collection Jejuri.

== Academic Response ==
Scholarly attention to Padmanabhan's The Island of Lost Girls has focused on its blending of feminist utopian and dystopian tropes, its ecological concerns, and its engagement with postcolonial and subaltern questions. The novel has been examined both as a standalone work of Indian speculative fiction and as an extension of the author's earlier dramatic preoccupations

Scholars have noted that Padmanabhan's work actively destabilizes essentialist perceptions of womanhood. By situating the narrative within a dystopian framework where women are systematically eradicated, the text critiques how both patriarchal regimes and radical feminist visions of "liberation"—such as ectogenesis—can lead to the erasure of female identity and agency. The novels are seen as a "neutralizing device" that forces readers to confront philosophical concerns regarding what constitutes a woman, moving beyond binary possibilities toward a postmodern, fragmented identity. The protagonist Meiji is frequently analysed as a posthuman figure who transcends the human/non-human and man/woman binaries. Her intra-active bonds with genetically modified creatures, such as the whale-lizard hybrid "Noor-Smaug," are interpreted as a form of posthuman resistance that allows her to forge an identity grounded in relationality rather than biological determinism

Scholars argue that the texts portray femicide as a product of structural violence, where women are stigmatized as "vermin" or "waste" within a technocratic, patriarchal order that privileges replaceability and efficiency. While Padmanabhan's novels share thematic DNA with works like Margaret Atwood’s The Handmaid’s Tale, critics observe that Padmanabhan’s focus is uniquely grounded in a realist critique of structural violence and systemic exclusion prevalent in the Indian context. The duology is credited with successfully navigating the space between the modernist "feminist" drive for a monolithic category of "woman" and a postmodern emphasis on subjective, fluid identity. Scholars also argue that Meiji's path represents a search for a "naturecultural" continuum, where her body—modified by both the state's violence and the island's regenerative technologies—becomes a site of both suffering and potential transcendence. By transcending biological determinism, Meiji's development serves as the primary mechanism through which Padmanabhan delivers her social critique

== Queer Critique ==
A major point of critical consensus among contemporary feminists and the Queer community is the highly problematic nature of transgender and non-binary representation within the novel. By basing the central plot on a global, biological genocide of females, Padmanabhan establishes a rigid gender binary that leaves no conceptual room for authentic trans or non-binary experiences. Furthermore, Youngest's forced gender reassignment surgery is criticized as a narrative tool that reduces trans transition to a cruel punishment and a biological mockery designed to preserve a heteronormative masculine order.

== Literary Award Nominations ==
The Island of Lost Girls received significant critical attention within the Indian literary establishment. The novel was selected as one of five books shortlisted for The Hindu Literary Prize 2016. The shortlist was praised by the jury, chaired by K. Satchidanandan, for its brief, serious, and non-gimmicky nature. The prize was ultimately won by Kiran Doshi for Jinnah Often Came to Our House
