= Kitu Gidwani =

Indian actress

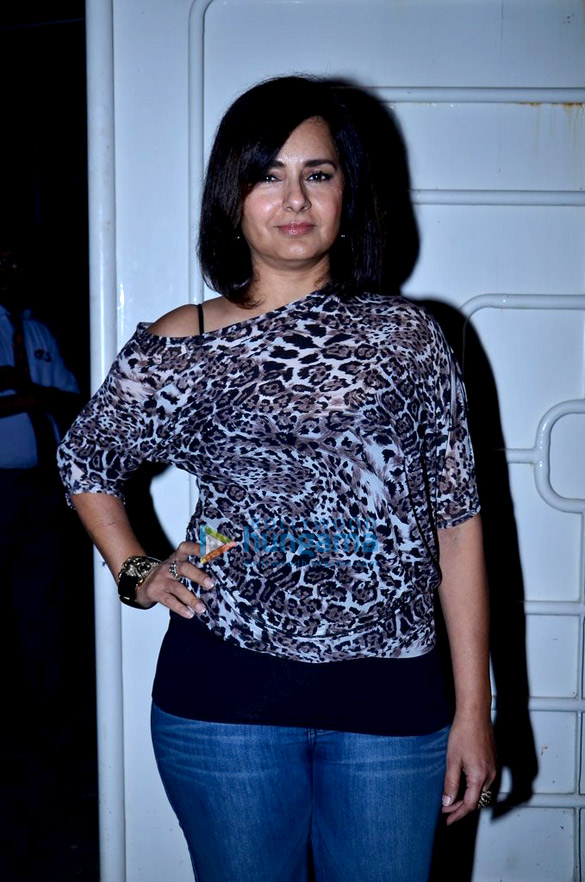
- Giddwani in 2013
- Born: Kaushalya Gidwani; 22 October 1967 (age 58); Bombay, Maharashtra, India
- Occupations: Actress, model, dancer
- Years active: 1984–present

Kaushalya "Kitu" Gidwani (born 22 October 1967) is an Indian actress and model. She has starred in several films and serials on Indian television.

Kitu played the role of Svetlana in Swabhimaan which brought recognition for her. Then she signed Shaktimaan and played the role of "Geeta Vishwas", a news channel reporter who stand for the truth. She left the show after a few episodes and later became popular after a TV series, Air Hostess aired on Doordarshan in 1986, and received critical acclaim for her roles in Dance of the Wind (1997), Deepa Mehta's Earth (1998), Govind Nihalani's Rukhmavati Ki Haveli (1991), Kamal Haasan's Abhay and Deham (2001).

== Early and personal life ==
Gidwani was born in Mumbai. Her Sindhi Hindu parents migrated from Pakistan after the partition. They lived in a refugee camp in Worli. She has a brother.

She studied in Fort Convent School, Mumbai. She graduated in Commerce and has an M.A. in French. She started acting in French plays. Soon she was acting in English plays directed by Janak Toprani. She acted in some television serials and subsequently acted in a French film Black (1987), playing a Brazilian girl in it.

== Acting career ==
Gidwani made her television debut in 1984 on the TV soap Trishna, and during the 1980s and '90s, gave some memorable performances in TV serials like Swabhimaan, Air Hostess and Junoon. She caught a lot of attention after her kissing scene in bed with actor Tom Alter in Junoon. In 1997, she was doing four serials at one time, besides Swabhimaan and Junoon, she was also acting in Saahil, Yeh Kahan Aa Gaye Hum. She recently appeared in multi-starrer Hindi serials Kaashish and Kulvadhu.

In 1997, she played the role of a Hindustani classical singer, Pallavi, who struggles to get her voice back after losing her mentor/mother, in Dance of the Wind. The role won her Best Actress Award at Three Continents Festival, Nantes. In Pankaj Butalia's Shadows in the Dark she played Lajma, a middle-aged woman living in present-day Pakistan. In the 2010s she played small roles in Fashion, Dhobi Ghat and Student of the Year.

In 2001, in conjunction with Wills Lifestyle, an apparel chain owned by ITC Limited, she promoted Wills Sport Lifestyle brand of clothing. In 2006, she also acted in a play, Your Place or Mine by Darshan Jariwala.

She also did a play, Sock 'em With Honey, where she played a traditional Parsi woman from Pakistan, whose daughter falls in love with a Jew, prompting her first trip abroad.

== Awards ==
In 1997, Gidwani won the Best Actress Award at the Three Continents Festival, Nantes, France. The award recognized her outstanding achievement for the role of Pallavi in Dance of the Wind.

== Filmography ==
Year	Title	Role	Notes
1984	Holi		
1985	Janam		Television film
1985	Wisdom Tree		Short film
1985	Trishna	Roohi	TV series
1986	Air Hostess		TV series
1987	Black	Topless Girl	French film
1991	Rukmavati Ki Haveli	Kittu Gidwani	
1991	The Khajuraho		Short film
1994	Junoon	Mini Agrawal	TV series
1994	Tehkikaat	Kavita Deshpande	TV series
1995–1996	Saahil	Prerna	TV series
1995–1997	Swabhimaan	Svetlana Banerjee	TV series
1997	Karvaan	Lajma	
1997	Dance of the Wind	Pallavi Sehgal	
1997	Shaktimaan	Geeta Vishwas	TV series
1998	Earth	Bunty Sethna	
2001	Deham	Jaya	
2001	Abhay	Jayanti	
2001	Aalavandhan	Jayanthi	Tamil film
2002	Nazarana	Ishita's mother	Television film
2004	Kesar	Pam Mallya	TV series
2005	Kasshish	Ratna	TV series
2006–2007	Kulvaddhu	Antra Singh Rathod	TV series
2006	Dil Diya Hai	Michelle	
2007	Strangers		
2008	Jaane Tu... Ya Jaane Na	Sheela Pariyar	
2008	Fashion	Anisha Roy	
2009	Phir Kabhi	Divya Singh	
2010	Hello Zindagi	Dr. Sadhana	
2011	Dhobi Ghat	Vatsala	
2011	Monica	Pamela Garewal	
2012	Student of the Year	Manini Banerjee	
2013	Ek Bura Aadmi	Rukmi Devi	
2015	Wedding Pullav		
2016	Traffic	Rehan's mother	
2017	Ok Jaanu	Tara's Mother	
2018	Yeh Un Dinon Ki Baat Hai	Sameer's step paternal Grandmother	TV series
2019	Fittrat	Pinky Kapoor	Web series
2020	Ghost Stories	Dhruv's mother	
2023	Hum Rahe Na Rahe Hum	Damayanti Barot / "Rani Sahiba"/ Queen of Ranak Garh	TV series
2025	Madam Driver	Devika	Hindi Film
