= Professor Sengupta =

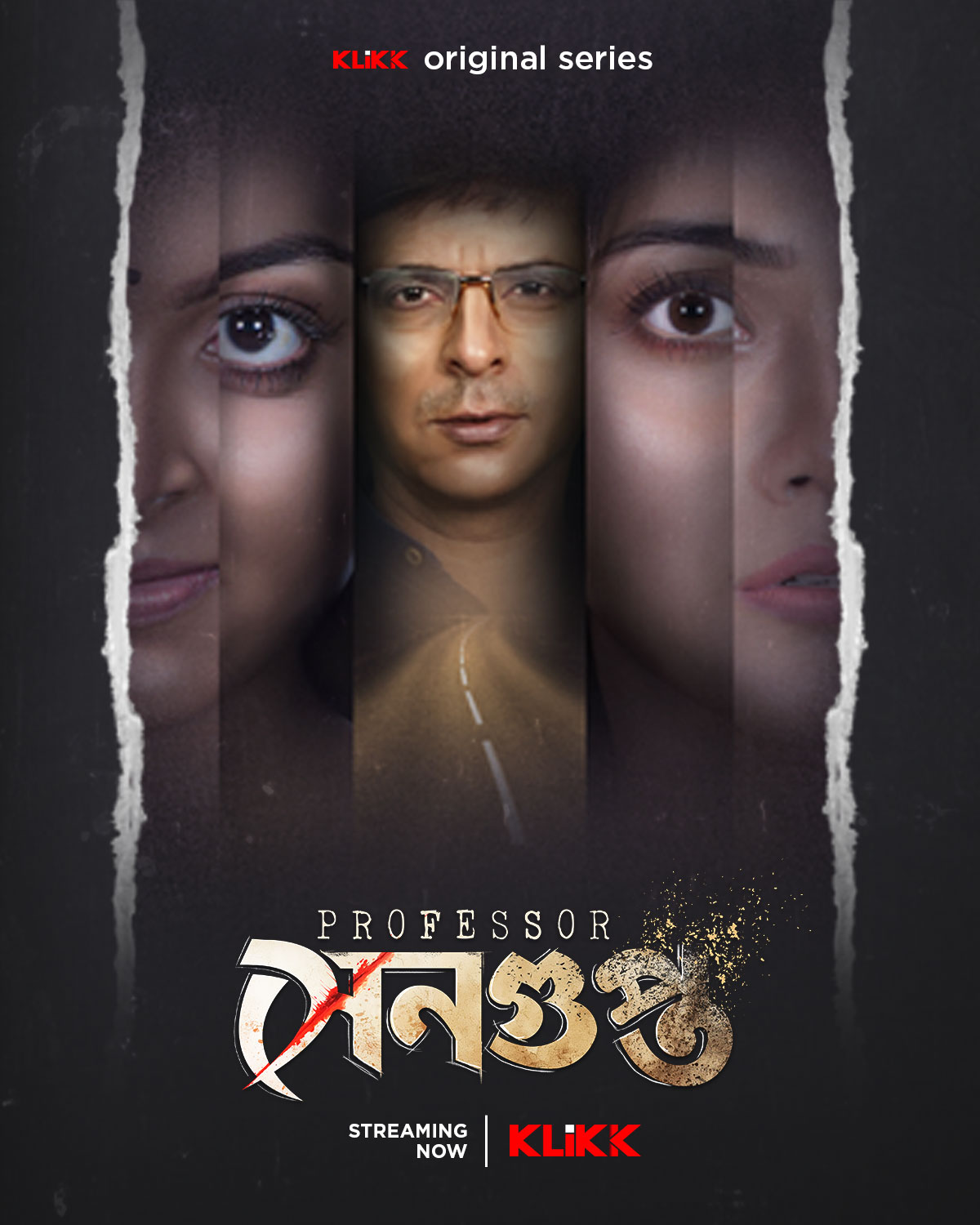
- Genre: Thriller, crime
- Written by: Soumit Deb,
- Story by: Subrata Guha Roy
- Directed by: Rajdeep Ghosh
- Starring: Joy Sengupta, Dipanwita Rakshit, Joyjit Banerjee, Jeet Sundor Chakraborty, Anuja Roy, Suman Guha
- Music by: Amit Das, Rajdeep Ghosh
- Country of origin: India
- Original language: Bengali
- No. of seasons: 1
- No. of episodes: 5

Production
- Producer: Santanu Chatterjee
- Cinematography: Pramit Das, Shubhajit Roy

Original release
- Network: Klikk
- Release: July 31, 2025

Professor Sengupta is a 2025 Indian Bengali psychological thriller web series directed by Rajdeep Ghosh and produced by Santanu Chatterjee. It is written by Soumit Deb and Subrata Guha Roy.

The series starring Joy Sengupta, Dipanwita Rakshit, Joyjit Banerjee, Jeet Sundor Chakraborty, Anuja Roy, and Suman Guha.

== Synopsis ==
The series stars Joy Sengupta as Dr. Anirban Sengupta who is an academic and living in a tranquil hillside home. The calm facade begins to crack when officer-in-charge Rajat (Joyjit Banerjee) arrives to investigate the murder of Pallab—a former student and investigative journalist. As the police dig deeper into the professor's past, they uncover that he is incapable of accepting rejection and has a dangerous obsession with young women, including his student Shrestha (Dipanwita Rakshit). Suspicions culminate when Shrestha goes missing and gruesome clues begin surfacing around the professor's otherwise quiet life.

== Cast ==
- Joy Sengupta as Anirban Sengupta
- Dipanwita Rakshit as Srestha
- Joyjit Banerjee as Rajat Mukherjee
- Jeet Sundor Chakraborty as Pallab
- Anuja Roy as Tusu
- Suman Guha as Gopal Dutta
- Aranya Roy Chowdhury as Tapu

== Episodes ==
| No. | Title | Directed by | Original release date |
|---|---|---|---|
| 1 | "The Man in the Boot" | Rajdeep Ghosh | 31 July 2025 |
There's a man with his hands and legs tied up, mouth gagged in the booty of Professor Sengupta's car. He takes him to a deep forest.
| 2 | "Dead Reporter" | Rajdeep Ghosh | 31 July 2025 |
Pallab who was professor Sengupta's student is found murdered. The police starts investigating the case. Pallab was a reporter in a relationship with Shrestha.
| 3 | "Lust and Obsession" | Rajdeep Ghosh | 31 July 2025 |
Professor Sengupta's past reveals that he is a pervert with a fascination for beautiful girls. He can't see the girl he loves with another man and can go to any extent to get her.
| 4 | "Search Begins" | Rajdeep Ghosh | 31 July 2025 |
The police receives Shrestha's missing complaint and goes to Prof. Sengupta's house for investigation.
| 5 | "Truth Closing In" | Rajdeep Ghosh | 31 July 2025 |
The inspector investigates the professor's past and he's sure that he is involved in the murder of Pallab and Shrestha. He is awaiting a forensic report that'll convict him.
