= Manjula Padmanabhan =

Indian writer, artist and journalist (born 1953)

- Born: 23 June 1953 (age 73); Delhi, India
- Education: Elphinstone College
- Occupations: Playwright, novelist, illustrator, short story person, journalist, children's book author
- Writing career
- Years active: 1979–present
- Genres: Comic strip, science fiction
- Notable awards: Onassis Award
- Website: magnoliana.com

Manjula Padmanabhan (born 23 June 1953) is an Indian playwright, journalist, comic strip artist, and children's book author. Her works explore science, technology, gender, and international inequalities.

== Life ==
Padmanabhan was born in Delhi in 1953 to an Indian diplomat father. She was raised in Sweden, Pakistan, and Thailand. She was an avid reader of comics and cartoons, and often drew and wrote as a child.

When Padmanabhan was sixteen, her father retired and her family returned to India, where she was surprised by the more traditional society and was limited by not knowing Hindi or Marathi.

Padmanabhan attended Elphinstone College. While at school, she worked at Parsiana to gain financial independence from her family.

== Career and works ==
Padmanabhan continued working as a journalist and book reviewer into her 20s and 30s. She began her career as an illustrator in 1979 with Ali Baig's book Indrani and the Enchanted Jungle.

In 1982, Padmanabhan created a comic strip, Doubletalk, which featured the female character Suki. She wrote a pitch to The Sunday Observer editor Vinod Mehta, who published her strip for many years. Suki then appeared six days a week in Delhi paper The Pioneer from 1992 to 1998. When Vinod Mehta left the publications and The Pioneer stopped publishing comics, Padmanabhan stopped creating Doubletalk.

Padmanabhan won the first ever Onassis Award for her play Harvest. An award-winning film Deham was made by Govind Nihalani based on the play.

Padmanabhan has continued to work as an author and illustrator, and has published short stories within many different volumes.

Padmanabhan returned to creating comics featuring Suki with the strip Suki Yaki for The Hindu's Business Line.

=== As playwright ===
- 1995 - The Artist's Model.
- 1996 - Sextet.
- 1997 - Harvest. London: Aurora Metro Books
- 2016 - "Lights Out"

=== As author and illustrator ===
- 2015 - Island of Lost Girls. Hachette.
- 2013 - Three Virgins and Other Stories New Delhi, India: Zubaan Books.
- 2011 - I am different! Can you find me? Watertown, Mass: Charlesbridge Pub.
- 2008 - Escape. Hachette.
- 2005 - Unprincess! New Delhi: Puffin Books.
- 2005 - Double talk. New Delhi: Penguin Books.
- 2004 - Kleptomania: Ten Stories. New Delhi: Penguin Books.
- 2004 - Mouse Invadors. Pan MacMillan. Written under the name Manjula Padma.
- 2003 - Mouse Attack. Pan MacMillan. Written under the name Manjula Padma.
- 2000 - This is Suki! New Delhi: Duckfoot Press.
- 1996 - Hot death, cold soup: twelve short stories. New Delhi: Kali for Women.
- 1986 - A Visit to the City Market New Delhi: National Book Trust

=== As illustrator ===
- 1989 - Indi Rana and Manjala Padmanabhan. The Devil in the Dustbin. London: Hamish Hamilton.
- 1984 - Maithily Jagannathan and Manjula Padmanabhan. Droopy dragon. New Delhi: Thomson Press.
- 1979 - Baig, Tara Ali, and Manjula Padmanabhan. Indrani and the enchanted jungle. New Delhi: Thomson Press (India) Ltd.

=== Comic strips ===
- 2015 - Suki Yaki. The Hindu's Business Line.
- 1982-1998 - Doubletalk. The Sunday Observer and The Pioneer.

=== Short stories ===
- 2019 - "The Rehearsal" in Displaced lives : fiction, poetry, memoirs, and plays from four continents. Ed. Frank Stewart, series editor; Alok Bhalla, Ming Di, guest editors. Honolulu : University of Hawaii Press.
- 2012 - "The other woman" in Breaking the bow : speculative fiction inspired by the Ramayana. Ed. Anil Menon, Vandana Singh. New Delhi: Zubaan.

=== Autobiography ===
- 2002 - Getting There
