= Grahan (film) =

2001 film by Shashilal K. Nair

- Directed by: Shashilal K. Nair
- Written by: Shashilal K. Nair
- Produced by: Avinaash Adik; Prakash Jaju; Ayesha Shroff; Jackie Shroff
- Starring: Jackie Shroff; Manisha Koirala
- Cinematography: S. Kumar
- Edited by: Waman Bhonsle
- Music by: Karthik Raja
- Release date: 16 February 2001
- Running time: 140 min
- Country: India
- Language: Hindi
- Budget: ₹5 crore
- Box office: ₹1.43 crore

Grahan (English: Eclipse) is a 2001 Indian crime drama film directed by Shashilal K. Nair, starring Jackie Shroff, Manisha Koirala and Raghuvaran. The film follows the story of Parvati, a rape victim who quests for justice, and learns that it is not such a simple task.

== Synopsis ==
The widowed Chief Minister Jagdish Acharya lives an opulent lifestyle along with his daughter, Sunita and son, Sanjay. One day he gets a phone call from the Police Commissioner informing him that a woman named Parvati has filed a F.I.R. (First Information Report) of rape against Sanjay. A shocked Jagdish instructs the Police Commissioner to proceed according to law. Soon after, while touring, Jagdish has a heart attack and dies. Sunita is asked to be the new Chief Minister and she accepts.

After the funeral the Police arrest Sanjay, hold him in a cell, and try him in court. Sunita's boyfriend, advocate Jaggan Sinha, whose brother, Raghu, is also a lawyer, represents Sanjay. Jaggan examines the evidence, witnesses and the complainant. He proves that the complaint was politically motivated by a journalist named Vidyarthi and that there was no evidence of rape. The Judge rules in favour of Sanjay and he is set free.

While the Archarya family celebrates Sanjay's release, Parvati's ensuing marriage with Bhaskar is called off by his parents and relatives due to the stigma on Parvati.

In the meanwhile, Jaggan finds out that Sanjay did indeed abduct and rape Parvati. Jaggan decides to reopen the case, much to the chagrin of Sunita and her brother. Sunita decides to support her brother and breaks-off with Jaggan.

Jaggan takes on the responsibility of caring for Parvati and takes her to a far off country house and also gets her mentally treated for her trauma. Parvati recovers and returns to the city.

She learns of the swearing-in ceremony of Sanjay and shoots at him during the ceremony. Parvati is arrested and jailed. Sunita does not want Jaggan to defend Parvati but Jaggan goes ahead and fights the case and wins it: Sanjay had died due to heart attack and not due to Parvati's shot. Parvati is acquitted and Bhaskar accepts Parvati and they get married. Jaggan and Sunita also reconcile.

== Cast ==
- Jackie Shroff as Advocate Jagan Sinha "Jaggu"
- Manisha Koirala as Parvati Shastri "Paro"
- Anupama Verma as Sunita Acharya
- Prasad Purandare as Sanjay Acharya
- Raghuvaran as Advocate Raghu Sinha
- Raj Zutshi as Bhaskar, Parvati's fiancé
- Achyut Potdar
- Chandrakant Gokhale as Parvati's Father
- Ranjit Kapoor
- Mirchandani
- Shashi Sharma
- Rahman Naushad
- Uday Dhruv
- Poornima
- Anant Jog as Inspector Shinde
- Ravi Patwardhan as Vidyarthi

== Soundtrack ==
Grahan

Soundtrack album by Karthik Raja
- Released: September 1997 (India)
- Genre: Feature film soundtrack
- Label: Time Audio

The songs in the film have been composed by Karthik Raja and the lyrics are written by Mehboob and Ila Arun. "Aaj Main Khush Hoon" is based on his uncredited composition "Netru Vandha Kaatru" from Kanmani.

Song	Singer
"Aaj Main Khush Hoon"	Asha Bhosle, Hariharan
"Ae Sochta Hai Kya"	Asha Bhosle, Hariharan
"Chup Chup Chup Chup"	Asha Bhosle, Abhijeet
"Kehte Hain Jisko Mohabbat"	Kavita Krishnamurthy, Abhijeet
"Nacho Jaise"	Kavita Krishnamurthy
"Disco Rap"	Dominique Cerejo
"Yeh Muniya" (Happy)	Ila Arun
"Yeh Muniya" (Sad)	Ila Arun

== Critical response ==
Taran Adarsh of IndiaFM gave the film one star out of five, writing, "On the whole, GRAHAN is a weak film in all respects. Lack of proper publicity, not-too-hot star cast and dull initial response will prove unfavourable for the film." Sukanya Verma of Rediff.com wrote, "Grahan doesn't give any sign of being a long-in-the-making project. In a nutshell, Grahan misfires for the want of a tight script and hard-hitting characters."

== Accolades ==
- Filmfare RD Burman Award for New Music Talent - Karthik Raja
