= Deham =

2001 film by Govind Nihalani

- Directed by: Govind Nihalani
- Written by: Govind Nihalani
- Based on: Harvest by Manjula Padmanabhan
- Starring: Kitu Gidwani; Joy Sengupta; Alyy Khan; Surekha Sikri; Julie Ames
- Cinematography: Govind Nihalani
- Edited by: Deepa Bhatia
- Music by: Roy Venkatraman
- Release date: 2001
- Running time: 120 minutes
- Country: India
- Language: English

Deham (The Body) is a 2001 film directed by Govind Nihalani based on playwright Manjula Padmanabhan's play Harvest. It has Kitu Gidwani, Joy Sengupta, Alyy Khan, Surekha Sikri and Julie Ames in lead roles. It is a futuristic story depicting the organ sale from relatively poorer countries to the rich. Nihalani himself called it a "serious social sci-fi film". Deham won the Netpac (Network for Promotion of Asian Cinema) award for the Best Asian Film at the 25th Goteborg Film Festival, 2002, in Sweden.

== Plot ==
It's 2022. Om Prakash, a jobless young man lives with his wife Jaya, mother and younger brother Jeetu in a one-room tenement in Mumbai. He falls for a multinational company's offer to provide his family a life of luxury for the rest of their lives in exchange for body organs for wealthy foreign clients. The family's life changes as he signs the contract. They lose their privacy as the company watches their every move. As part of the contract, Om has to pose as a bachelor and Jaya, his wife, is forced to call herself his sister. But Jeetu, who works as a gigolo, refuses to permit himself to be controlled and walks out of home. After few months as Om, Jaya and his mother, are growing accustomed to their new life, Jeetu comes back, battered and beaten. As Jaya nurses him the time for the organ transplants comes. The company officials come and take away Jeetu instead of Om for the transplants. Jaya, who has been putting up with it all for long, finally, refuses to become a party to the contract and chooses freedom instead.

== Cast ==
- Kitu Gidwani as Jaya
- Joy Sengupta as Om Prakash
- Alyy Khan as Jeetu, Om's brother
- Surekha Sikri as Om's mother
- Julie Ames as Virginia, the American organ-buyer

== Reception ==
Pramila N. Phatarphekar of Outlook called the film's vision "impaired." She further wrote, "Unforgivably bludgeoning Manjula Padmanabhan's cleverly-crafted play with poor FX and miserly production values, Nihalani stumbles."

Priya Ganapati of Rediff.com wrote, "What makes it an utter disaster is its combination of a terrible screenplay, stilted acting, poor dialogues and more important, an inability to infuse soul or imagination to a plot that in its very premise demands an abundance of it."
