= Guilty (2020 film) =

2020 film by Ruchi Narain

- Official release poster
- Directed by: Ruchi Narain
- Written by: Kanika Dhillon; Ruchi Narain; Atika Chohan
- Produced by: Karan Johar; Apoorva Mehta
- Starring: Kiara Advani; Akansha Ranjan Kapoor; Gurfateh Pirzada; Taher Shabbir
- Cinematography: Andrew Boulter
- Edited by: Bodhaditya Banerjee
- Music by: Ankur Tewari
- Production company: Dharmatic Entertainment
- Distributed by: Netflix
- Release date: 6 March 2020
- Running time: 119 minutes
- Country: India
- Language: Hindi

Guilty is a 2020 Indian Hindi-language thriller drama film directed by Ruchi Narain and written by Ruchi Narain, Kanika Dhillon and Atika Chohan. Starring Kiara Advani, the film follows the story of a songwriter whose boyfriend is accused of rape during the era of #MeToo. The film is the first production venture of Dharmatic, the digital arm of Karan Johar's Dharma Productions. It was released on 6 March 2020 on Netflix.

== Plot ==
Nanki Dutta is a songwriter for her boyfriend, Vijay "VJ" Pratap Singh's band. She finds herself in a dilemma when Tanu Kumar, a new student in her university who has a crush on VJ, joins in the #MeToo movement accusing him of having sexually assaulted her on the night of Valentine's 2018 on Twitter. Nanki attempts help Vijay by consulting Danish Ali Baig, the lawyer investigating VJ's side of the story. Throughout the movie, we experience Nanki's frequent panic attacks and hallucinations based on the recent incident. Later on in the movie, Danish wins the case and Vijay is released much to Tanu's dismay. VJ tells Nanki that he has cheated on her by sleeping with Tanu, but did not assault her. However, Nanki remains suspicious due to inconsistencies with the case. During a festival held at the campus, Tanu explains every detail of what happened during the fateful night while exposing her true intentions and feeling towards Vijay. Nanki deduces Tanu's #MeToo tweet and ties every loose end cited throughout the film and comes to the realization that Tanu told the truth all along that Vijay is actually a demon and raped Tanu when his ego got hurt. Vijay's crime gets reported by Nanki and is arrested by the local authorities. Soon after, Nanki gains the courage to share her own experience with sexual abuse, when she was 13 years old, encouraged by a relieved Tanu.

== Cast ==
- Kiara Advani as Nanki Dutta: VJ's girlfriend
  - Janya Joshi as Young Nanki
- Akansha Ranjan Kapoor as Tanu Kumar: The new girl in St.Martin's and VJ's crush
- Gurfateh Pirzada as Vijay "VJ" Pratap Singh: Nanki's boyfriend and Tanu's crush
- Taher Shabbir as Advocate Danish Ali Baig: VJ's lawyer
- Tenzin Dalha as Tashi
- Dalip Tahil as Advocate Dev Mirchandani: Danish's boss
- Kunal Vijaykar as Dr. Roy: Nanki's professor and local guardian
- Niki Aneja Walia as Sushma Singh: VJ's mother
- Manu Rishi as Pratap Singh: VJ's father
- Fahad Ali as Rahul Jha
- Rohan Arora as Kerbie
- Deepanshu Titoriya as Deepak
- Sahil Mehta as Arnab Mitra
- Ashish Khanna as Hardy: VJ's friend
- Gehna Seth as Professor
- Chayan Chopra as KP

== Production ==
In June 2019, a report from Filmfare stated Kiara Advani signing a new project for Dharmatic Entertainment, the digital arm of Karan Johar's Dharma Productions, titled Guilty which was helmed by Ruchi Narain. The principal photography of the film began in Delhi in June 2019 and completed within 33 days.

== Soundtrack ==
Guilty

Soundtrack album by Ankur Tewari
- Released: 2 March 2020
- Genre: Feature film soundtrack
- Length: 25:17
- Language: Hindi
- Label: Sony Music India
- Producer: Ankur Tewari

The film score and soundtrack is composed by Ankur Tewari with lyrics written by Kausar Munir.

No.	Title	Singer(s)	Length
1.	"Rehne Do Na"	Ankur Tewari	03:11
2.	"Chaak Girebain"	Ankur Tewari	03:40
3.	"Kahun"	Ankur Tewari	05:07
4.	"Kahun (Reprise)"	Ankur Tewari, Divya L	05:05
5.	"Likhi Meri"	Ankur Tewari	04:07
6.	"Likhi Meri (Reprise)"	Ankur Tewari, Divya L	04:05
Total length:			25:17

== Reception ==
On the review aggregator website Rotten Tomatoes, 55% of 11 critics' reviews are positive, with an average rating of 5.3/10.
