= Shashilal K. Nair =

Indian film director and producer

- Occupations: Director, producer
- Years active: 1981–2002

Shashilal K. Nair is an Indian film director and producer. He began his career as an assistant director to K. Viswanath in films like Shankarbharanam, Sargam, and Kaam Chor. He made his directorial debut with the film Bahu Ki Awaaz in 1985. which was described by the Directorate of Film Festival as a "strong comment on bride burning and dowry", and since then has directed eight motion pictures, which include Karamdaata (1986), Parivaar (1987), Kroadh (1990), Angaar (1992), One 2 Ka 4 (2001) and Ek Chhotisi Love Story (2002). For his special effects in Angaar, he received the National Film Award for Best Special Effects, for "his absolutely convincing miniature work in the film".

== Filmography ==
Year	Film
1985	Bahu Ki Awaaz
1986	Karamdaata
1987	Parivaar
1988	Falak
1990	Kroadh
1992	Angaar
2001	Grahan
2001	One 2 Ka 4
2002	Ek Chhotisi Love Story

== Awards ==
- 1993, National Film Award for Best Special Effects, Angaar
