= Kahe Naa Kahe =

- Genre: Drama
- Created by: Ekta Kapoor
- Written by: Dialogues; Rekha Modi
- Screenplay by: Manish Shrivastav
- Story by: Arshad Sayed
- Directed by: Rishi Tyagi; Swapnil Mahaling; Mujammil Desai
- Creative director: Nivedita Basu
- Starring: Krystal D'Souza; Karan Hukku
- Opening theme: "Kahe Naa Kahe" by Priya Bhattacharya
- Composer: Manek Satya
- Country of origin: India
- Original language: Hindi
- No. of seasons: 1
- No. of episodes: 150

Production
- Producers: Ekta Kapoor; Shobha Kapoor
- Production locations: Mumbai, India
- Cinematography: Sanjay Memane
- Editor: Vikas Sharma
- Camera setup: Multi-camera
- Running time: 18-22 minutes
- Production company: Balaji Telefilms

Original release
- Network: 9X
- Release: 12 November 2007 – 5 July 2008

Kahe Naa Kahe is a Hindi Indian soap opera created by Ekta Kapoor for the network 9X. The show premiered on 12 November 2007 and stars Krystal D'Souza and Karan Hukku. The show ended on 3 July 2008 and was replaced by Kahaani Hamaaray Mahaabhaarat Ki.

== Plot ==
The show revolves around Kinjal who dreams of love and marriage like an ordinary Indian girl but with a difference. The show explores how her mother Urmila supports her dreams in leading her life and in making her daughter well good to lead her life. The show also explores Kanav who is a rich spoilt brat and how he falls in love with Kinjal.

== Cast ==
- Krystal D'Souza/Wasna Ahmed as Kinjal Pandey
- Karan Hukku as Kanav
- Reshmi Ghosh/Madhura Naik as Neena
- Darpan Srivastav/Muni Jha as Sudhir Pandey
- Vaishnavi Mahant as Urmila Pandey
- Chinky Jaiswal as Raina
- Naman Shaw as Vidyut
