= Ek Chhotisi Love Story =

Ek Chotisi Love Story
- Film poster
- Directed by: Shashilal K. Nair
- Based on: A Short Film About Love by Krzysztof Kieślowski
- Produced by: Shashilal K. Nair
- Starring: Manisha Koirala; Aditya Seal
- Cinematography: C. K. Muraleedharan
- Music by: Aravind Nirmal
- Production companies: Paragon Pictures International; Shringar films
- Release date: 6 September 2002
- Running time: 129 minutes
- Country: India
- Language: Hindi
- Budget: ₹1.5 crore
- Box office: ₹8.1 crore

Ek Chhotisi Love Story (transl. One Small Love Story) is a 2002 Indian romantic film directed by Shashilal K. Nair. The film is an adaptation of Krzysztof Kieślowski's A Short Film About Love (Krótki film o miłości 1988). It was successful at the box office.

== Plot ==
A boy has been spying on a beautiful older woman who lives in an adjacent apartment complex. Using a telescope, he watches her every night performing mundane tasks. To get closer to her, he visits her at her workplace to repair cassettes. He also calls her anonymously to hear her voice.

He learns there is a problem with the milk deliveries for her apartment complex, so he takes the delivery job to be closer to her. One night he sees her return home after breaking up with her latest boyfriend, spilling a bottle of milk, and then weeping over another failed relationship. Later, he asks his grandmother, "Why do people cry?". After getting frustrated because of getting fired from the job and breaking up, she has a confrontation with the boy who follows her and admits that he has been visiting her just to see her, that he saw her crying, and that he's been watching her. That night, she arranges her bed so that the boy can see her with another boyfriend. When they are in bed, she tells him that they're being watched by someone across the way. The boyfriend rushes down to the street, calls out to him who comes downstairs, and then punches him in the face for peeping.

The next day, while delivering milk, the boy admitted that he loves her and that he expects nothing in return. Overwhelmed by his feelings, he rushes up to the roof of the building and then returns to her apartment and asks her for a date—and she accepts. During their date at a cafe, she learns that the boy has been watching her for a year and that he stole letters mailed to her by her boyfriend. At first, she's upset, but then she dismisses it. In response to his earlier declaration of love, she tells him that love doesn't exist—only sex. She shows him how to caress her hands the way lovers do.

Later that night at her apartment, he gives her a small gift after she showers, but she says she's not a good person and doesn't deserve gifts. Crouching in front of him, she guides his hands onto her thighs, and he has an orgasm. She tells him how the love just delights us briefly. She later tells him to clean himself up, after which he runs away, embarrassed and upset. The woman feels guilty and tries to communicate with him at her window—gesturing for him to call her and holding up a sign, but there is no response. Back in his apartment, he cuts his wrists with a razor blade. Later, she comes to his apartment to return the coat he left behind and learns from his grandmother that he tried to kill himself and was taken to the hospital. She tells her, "I think I hurt him." His grandmother shows her the room and his telescope and tells her, "He loved you very much."

In the coming days, she is unable to find him. When she tries to search for him through the name his grandmother told her, it turns out to be a false name—she is clearly worried and concerned about his well-being. One night, she receives a phone call, and thinking it is him, she acknowledges that he was right about love (the call is actually from someone with phone trouble). After days of waiting and watching his window with her binoculars, she finally sees he's returned. She goes to his apartment, and his grandmother shows her to his room, where she sees him sleeping, his wrists still bandaged. The grandmother prevents her from getting too close to him—even preventing her from touching his bandaged wrist. Noticing the telescope, she looks through it toward her own apartment and imagines what the must-have seen that night, watching her come home, spilling the milk, and weeping over another failed relationship. Then she closes her eyes and imagines him in her apartment with her, reaching out to comfort her.

== Cast ==
- Manisha Koirala as The woman who is secretly followed by a boy
- Aditya Seal as Aditya, a boy who follows the woman
- Ranvir Shorey as the Woman's boyfriend
- Saroj Bhargava as Aditya's grandmother

== Release ==
Prior to the film's release on 6 September 2002, Koirala obtained a court order to stay the release of the film pending deletion of some shots she found to be objectionable. She claimed that she had been impersonated by a body double in some shots. Despite court ban the film was released in select theatres on 6 September, Shyam Shroff of Shringar films commented on the issue saying, ″95 prints of the film had already been passed on to exhibitors all over the country and some of them have been sent abroad for screening. It was difficult to recall the prints now and the film may be screened by exhibitors.″ On 18 October 2002, Bombay High Court dismissed Koirala's appeal against the release of the film. The film was released nationwide on 22 November 2002.

== Critical response ==
Chitra Mahesh of The Hindu gave a negative review, writing, ″None (save Saroj) in the cast does anything that could have made the film worthwhile. Manisha looks horrible, jaded and seemingly uninterested. This whole thing about using the body double has only made people want to see what the hoopla is all about! But once there, how many can actually sit through the painful lethargy of the scenes? Aditya as the young boy is cute, but without any warmth or energy to draw empathy. Background score by Arvind Nirmal, is reminiscent of European films — a strange brooding quality that drives one to further depression.″ Deepa Gahlot of Rediff.com stated, ″It is not only a bad copy, it is an irresponsible film.″

== See also ==
- Malèna, a film with a similar storyline, starring Monica Bellucci.
