= Akansha Ranjan Kapoor =

American actress

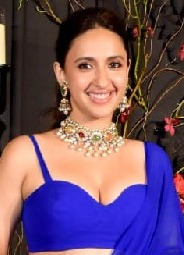
- Kapoor in 2024
- Born: 18 September 1993 (age 33); Mumbai, Maharashtra, India
- Citizenship: United States
- Education: Whistling Woods, Mumbai
- Occupation: Actress
- Years active: 2019–present
- Spouse: Sharan Sharma (m. 2026)
- Relatives: Anushka Ranjan (sister); Aditya Seal (brother-in-law)

Akansha Ranjan Kapoor (born 18 September 1993) is an American Actress of Indian origin who primarily works in Hindi films. Kapoor made her film debut with Guilty (2020) for which she received a Filmfare OTT Awards nomination. She made her web debut with Netflix's series Ray (2021).

== Early life ==
Kapoor was born on 18 September 1993, in Mumbai to affluent parents, Shashi Ranjan, an actor/director from FTII and the Publisher of GR8 Magazine, and Anu Ranjan, the Founder of The Indian Television Academy. She has an elder sister named Anushka Ranjan, who is also an actress.

After completing her schooling from Jamnabai Narsee School, Akansha pursued an acting diploma from Whistling Woods. Kapoor is an American citizen and voted for Kamala Harris in the 2024 US elections.

== Career ==
Kapoor started her career in 2019 with the television fashion series, TLC's Decoded. She next appeared in the music video Tere Do Naina alongside Aparshakti Khurana.

In 2020, she made her film debut with the Netflix film Guilty where she was seen as a rape victim. She received Best Supporting Actor (Female) nomination for her performance.

Kapoor next made her web debut with the 2021 Netflix series Ray, where she was seen opposite Harshvardhan Kapoor. She next appeared in the music video "Hum Hi Hum The" alongside Aashim Gulati. Kapoor next appeared alongside Rajkummar Rao, Radhika Apte and Huma Qureshi in Monica, O My Darling.

== Filmography ==
Key
†	Denotes films that have not yet been released

=== Films ===
Year	Title	Role	Language	Notes	Ref.
2020	Guilty	Tanu Kumar	Hindi		
2022	Monica, O My Darling	Nikki Adhikari	Hindi		
2024	Jigra	Flight attendant	Hindi	Cameo appearance	
2026	Ikka	Soma Mittal	Hindi	Netflix film	
TBA	MaayaOne †	TBA	Tamil; Telugu	Completed	

=== Television ===
Year	Title	Role	Notes	Ref.
2019	Decoded	Herself		
2021	Ray	Anuya	Segment: "Spotlight"	
2025–present	Gram Chikitsalay	Dr. Gargi	Recurring	

=== Music videos ===
Year	Title	Singer(s)	Ref.
2019	Tere Do Naina	Ankit Tiwari	
2022	Hum Hi Hum The	Bandish Vaz	
2023	Dastoor	Jasleen Royal	

== Awards and nominations ==
Year	Award	Category	Work	Result	Ref.
2021	Filmfare OTT Awards	Best Supporting Actress - Web Original Film	Guilty	Nominated	
2021	Indian Television Academy Awards	Best Debut Actress of the Year -OTT	Guilty	Won	
