= Aru Krishansh Verma =

Indian film actor and model

Aru K. Verma
- Born: Lucknow, Uttar Pradesh, India
- Occupations: Actor, Model
- Years active: 2010–present
- Parent(s): Jyoti A. Verma, Ashwani K. Verma
- Website: arukverma.com

Aru K Verma, aka Aru Verma is an Indian actor.

== Early life ==
Born in Lucknow, Aru K. Verma as a child, moved all over north India with his family, among cities like Lucknow, Ambala, Karnal and Dehradun, where he completed parts of his education, and finished his schooling from Mount St. Marys, Delhi.

== Career ==
Verma played the role of Shah Rukh Khan's best friend in Jab Harry Met Sejal, and he shed 30 kilos for his role. Verma was inspired by Shah Rukh Khan to become fit for his role. He appeared in a Sony TV show The Drama Company

== Filmography ==
=== Films ===
Film	Year	Role
2011	Jo Dooba So Paar: It's Love in Bihar!	School-mate
2011	Rockstar	Bhappa Sardar
2012	Myoho	Motu, Abhishek
2013	Once Upon ay Time in Mumbai Dobaara!	Hero at Awards function
2014	Karle Pyaar Karle	Bunty
2014	2 States	Duke
2015	Bezubaan Ishq	Parbat
2015	Wedding Pullav	Petha
2016	Befikre	Mehra
2017	Jab Harry Met Sejal	Mayank
2020	Dostana 2	Dev

=== Web series ===
Year	Title	Role	Platform
2019	Fittrat	Gaurav "Bunty" Sareen	ALTBalaji and ZEE5
