= Belan Wali Bahu =

Indian television series

- Genre: Comedy Sitcom
- Created by: Dheeraj Sarna
- Written by: Dheeraj Sarna
- Directed by: Deven Bhojani
- Starring: See below
- Opening theme: Belan Wali Bahu
- Country of origin: India
- Original language: Hindi
- No. of seasons: 1
- No. of episodes: 127

Production
- Producers: Dheeraj Sarna; Ved Raj
- Production location: Mumbai
- Camera setup: Multi-camera
- Running time: 20–46 minutes
- Production company: Shoonya Square Productions

Original release
- Network: Colors TV
- Release: 15 January – 22 June 2018

Belan Wali Bahu is an Indian fantasy comedy television series that aired on Colors TV from 15 January to 22 June 2018.

== Plot ==
Roopa Awasthi is a clumsy, soft-hearted housewife who tries her best to impress everyone. One day she accidentally murders her husband, Amarnath Awasthi, with a rolling pin. Roopa wins everyone's hearts as she, along with her dead husband (who is in the form of a ghost) helps the family to get out of challenging situations. The show throws light on how the role of an average housewife is hugely undermined in an Indian household.

== Cast ==
=== Main ===
- Krystle D'Souza as Roopa Awasthi: Amarnath's widow and murderer
- Dheeraj Sarna as Amarnath "Laddu" Awasthi: Premnath and Premlata's eldest son; Jitendranath, Dolly and Narendranath's brother; Roopa's husband (Dead/Ghost)

=== Supporting ===
- Sudhir Pandey as Rajnath Awasthi: Premnath's father; Amarnath, Jitendranath, Dolly and Narendranath's grandfather
- Mushtaq Khan as Premnath Awasthi: Rajnath's son; Premlata's husband; Amarnath, Jitendranath, Dolly and Narendranath's father
- Bhavana Balsavar as Premlata Awasthi: Premnath's wife; Amarnath, Jitendranath, Dolly and Narendranath's mother
- Sikandar Kharbanda as Jeetendranath "Jeetu" Awasthi: Suspended Police Officer; Premnath and Premlata's second son; Amarnath, Dolly and Narendranath's brother; Shalini's husband
- Sunayana Fozdar as Shalini Awasthi: Jitendranath's wife
- Khushboo Shroff as Dolly Awasthi Sharma: Premnath and Premlata's daughter; Amarnath, Jitendranath and Narendranath's sister; Jimmy's wife
- Krunal Pandit as Jimmy Sharma: Dolly's husband
- Parijat Atreja as Narendranath Awasthi: Premnath and Premlata's youngest son; Amarnath, Dolly and Jeetendranath's brother
- Shraddha Jaiswal as Suzie: Rajnath's nurse
- Manishaa Purohit as Katori: Awasthi's neighbour

=== Special appearances ===
- Manish Goplani as Lallan, a thief, Roopa's childhood friend.
- Rajesh Kumar as Mahesh, a ghost, Amarnath's childhood friend.
- Paresh Ganatra as Bobby, a dancer, Amarnath's friend.
- Meena Naithani as Kamini, a maid.
- Rohan Gandotra as Parth from Dil Se Dil Tak (16 March 2018)
- Rashami Desai as Shorvori from Dil Se Dil Tak (16 March 2018)
- Jasmin Bhasin as Teni from Dil Se Dil Tak (16 March 2018)

== Episodes ==
No.	Title
1	"Beware of the Belanwali Bahu"
Two things most important in Roopa's life are her husband and the belan! But when Roopa accidentally hits her husband on the head, their lives take a weird turn.
2	"The family learns of Amarnath's death"
Members of the Awasthi family are left in shock when they discover Amarnath's body. As realization dawns on Roopa, Amarnath's ghost confronts her and vows never to leave her until her crime is revealed. How will Roopa deal with this situation?
3	"The family tries to bid goodbye!"
A funeral has been organized for Amarnath so that his soul may rest in peace. However, he fights their attempts and convinces Roopa to tell his family the truth about his death. Will he succeed?
4	"Trouble at the ghat"
Roopa and the others take Amarnath's ashes to do the last rites for his salvation. In a baffling turn of events, they end up with a bomb instead of his ashes. Amarnath begs Roopa to cease the ritual. What will happen to Amarnath?
5	"Belanwali Bahu arrested?"
Roopa shocks the entire family by confessing to having murdered Amarnath. But much to Amarnath's dismay, the family and the police are not ready to believe it. Will Roopa be arrested?
6	"Will Roopa get back her Belan?"
Roopa decides to participate in a competition to win back her belan. She finds her mother-in-law, sister-in-law, and Suzie also participating in the competition. Will Roopa be able to win back her belan and prove her guilt?
7	"Will Roopa be arrested now?"
Roopa wins the competition and reclaims the Belan. With the murder weapon in her hands, she goes straight to the police station to confess her crime. Will the police believe her this time?
8	"Roopa lies to the family"
Roopa's claim that she can see Amarnath's ghost creates a lot of confusion in the family. Owing to this confusion, Premlata almost gets into an accident. So to avoid further confusion, Roopa falsely informs them that Amarnath's ghost is just a figment of her imagination. How will Amarnath react to Roopa's lie?
9	"Awasthi family in a pickle!"
A problem arises for the Awasthi family when Jimmy brings in a huge order to make a Chinese pickle. This ends up interfering with their responsibility of making Prashad for the Jagrata. What will happen now?
10	"Amarnath is jealous of Roopa!"
Roopa and Amarnath manage to prepare the prasad in the nick of time, saving the family's reputation. When everyone praises Roopa, Amarnath gets infuriated with her. He comes up with a plan to get her kicked out of the house. Will he succeed in his scheme?
11	"Will Dadaji be out of the picture?"
The Awasthi family is excited about taking a photo for their incense stick brand, Rajnath Agarbathi. What happens when they try to keep Dadaji away from this family picture? Will Amarnath be able to use this as an opportunity to get his revenge on Roopa? Whose photo will end up on the packet?
12	"Roopa is in deep trouble"
Much to the Awasthi family's shock, an enraged Dadaji leaves the house, and Roopa is blamed for this turn of events. Roopa tries to persuade Dadaji to return home, but he refuses. What will she do now?
13	"Dadaji ends up in jail"
Dadaji and Suzie decide to spend the night in a temple yard. But unfortunately, the police mistake them for lovers and arrest them. With the family refusing to approach Dadaji, the burden falls upon Roopa to bail him out. Will she succeed?
14	"Amarnath's last wish"
Roopa promises Amarnath that she will fulfill his last wish if he has any. He shares a humiliating incident from his childhood where his father punished him by making him stand in the courtyard only in his innerwear. To take revenge, Amarnath asks Roopa to hide his father's pants. Will Roopa fulfill his wish?
15	"Roopa fulfills Amarnath's wish"
To fulfill his last wish, Amarnath decides to take Roopa out in the evening. Roopa gets excited by the thought of spending some quality time with her husband. Will her date with the ghost turn into a disaster?
16	"Roopa learns to dance"
Amarnath's childhood friend, Bobby, arrives to meet the Awasthi family. He learns about Roopa's effort in learning how to dance for performance to fulfill Amarnath's wish and decides to help her. Soon, all the ladies of the Awasthi family ask Bobby to teach them to dance. Will Roopa be able to learn the dance and fulfill Amarnath's wish?
17	"Roopa delays the performance"
Roopa gets anxious when Amarnath is nowhere to be found at the dance performance. She does not want to perform without him in the audience and keeps giving excuses to delay the performance. Where is Amarnath?
18	"Bobby in love with Roopa?"
Bobby starts to develop romantic feelings for Roopa, making her uncomfortable. She informs Amarnath about the situation, but he refuses to believe her. What will Roopa do now?
19	"Amarnath wants Bobby out"
Amarnath is enraged when Bobby proposes to his wife, Roopa. He wants Bobby out of the house so that he will stop pursuing her. But how will Amarnath get rid of Bobby?
20	"Amarnath's new plan!"
To get rid of Bobby, Amarnath presents an interesting new plan and informs Roopa about the same. What is Amarnath's plan? Will the Awasthi family be able to get rid of Bobby?
21	"Amarnath puts Roopa in trouble"
Unaware that Amarnath is dead and that his spirit is still on earth, Yamraj reveals himself to Amarnath. Scared about being dragged away, Amarnath lies to Yamraj and convinces him that Roopa is the ghost. Will Yamraj go after Roopa's spirit now?
22	"Roopa discovers the truth"
In a shocking turn of events, Roopa knows that Amarnath has successfully made Yamraj believe that she is dead and her spirit is still stuck on earth. How will Roopa react? Will Yamraj take back Roopa with him?
23	"Roopa's request to Yamraj"
Yamraj is adamant about taking Amarnath with him, but Roopa pleads before him to free Amarnath. She agrees to bear the punishments on Amarnath's behalf. Will Yamraj abide by Roopa's request?
24	"Roopa gets a last chance"
After Roopa fails to stand by her word, Yamraj decides to take Amarnath away with him. But, when Roopa refuses to part from Amarnath, Yamraj offers her the last chance to save her husband. Will Roopa be able to save Amarnath?
25	"Yamraj fulfills Roopa's wish"
Seeing Roopa's unconditional love for Amarnath, Yamraj grants Amarnath permission to stay on the earth. Yamraj also fulfills Roopa's wish to reanimate Amarnath under certain rules and conditions for ten days. What could the conditions be?
26	"A challenge for Roopa and Amarnath"
As per Yamraj's condition, Amarnath cannot reveal his true self to the Awasthi family. To obey him, Amarnath disguises himself as a doctor and is introduced to the family by Roopa. Will Roopa and Amarnath be able to keep the secret?
27	"Amarnath's secret in danger"
Much to Roopa's relief, Amarnath successfully fools the family with his convincing disguise. But little do they know that Premnath has overheard one of their intimate conversations, and now he is deeply suspicious. Will Amarnath's pretense come to light?
28	"A big test for Amarnath"
Dadaji gets deeply suspicious following Amarnath's failure to prioritize his simplest medical needs. Now, he is out to test Amarnath's credibility as a doctor. Will Amarnath's fake doctor persona be exposed? How will Roopa handle this situation?
29	"An outrageous misunderstanding"
When Amarnath invites Roopa on a secret date to a cafe, Suzie overhears his plan and mistakes that the invitation is meant for her. Amarnath gets trapped in an uncomfortable conversation with a love-struck Suzie at the cafe. But little do they know that Dadaji and Premnath are following their every move in disguise. What will happen next?
30	"Amarnath, and Roopa to remarry"
After the misunderstanding between Suzie, Roopa and Amarnath are resolved, the Awasthi family fixes Roopa's marriage to Amarnath. What will be this amazing new chapter in the Roopa Amarnath story be like?
31	"Amarnath-Roopa's new problem"
Amarnath, who is living under the disguise of Guddu, is set to tie the knot with Roopa again. The wedding plans hit a hurdle when Amarnath realizes that he doesn't have a house to live in after marrying Roopa. Can the couple find a solution to this problem?
32	"Amarnath in jeopardy"
After Amarnath's engagement party, his father enthusiastically offers to share a drink with him. As Amarnath gets intoxicated with each passing minute, will this lead to him revealing the fact that he is living in the house disguised as Guddu?
33	"Amarnath plans a romantic date"
When Roopa wishes for a date with her husband, Amarnath plans a romantic date while the family is away. But he's unaware that they are not alone at home. Will Amarnath's secret finally be exposed?
34	"Amarnath's identity revealed!"
Amarnath's role as Guddu Singh comes to an abrupt end when a man demands 5 lakh rupees, claiming that Guddu borrowed that money from him. To prove that he has mistaken Guddu for someone else, Roopa reveals that Guddu is, in fact, Amarnath. How will the Awasthi family react to this revelation?
35	"Amarnath, a spirit again?"
One night, Dadaji passes out because of chest pain, and Amarnath is forced to come to his aid, resulting in him breaking the rule set by Yamraj. Soon enough, after Dadaji regains consciousness, Amarnath returns to his spirit form. How will Roopa explain Guddu's disappearance to the family?
36	"Roopa's Holi mission"
Amarnath reveals that his grandmother's death is why the Awasthi family doesn't celebrate Holi anymore. Soon Roopa makes it a mission to bring Holi back into the house, and she plans to use Amarnath's brother to make her mission work. How will she persuade him?
37	"Amarnath hatches a new plan"
Roopa is dismayed when everyone in the family refuses to talk to Dadaji about celebrating Holi. To help Roopa in her cause, Amarnath comes up with a plan to bring back memories of his grandmother in front of Dadaji. Will Amarnath's idea work?
38	"Holi with a stranger?"
While Roopa and her family are immersed in the Holi fever, Jitender provides them with refreshing drinks laced with a drug. Will they notice a stranger lurking and observing their actions in their inebriated state?
39	"Roopa falls unconscious"
Jeetendra stops a theft from happening at the Awasthi house. But the heroic deed is overshadowed by his confession that he accidentally added a dangerous amount of Bhang pills to Roopa's drink. With Roopa lying unconscious on her bed, how will the family wake her up?
40	"Poetry to revive Roopa"
To revive Roopa from her state of unconsciousness, the Awasthi family decides to hold a Kavi Sammelan. Each family member has to recite their poem and stand a chance to win a prize if Roopa gains consciousness due to their poem. Will this bizarre plan work?
41	"Roopa's life in danger!"
When Amarnath gets into a confrontation with another ghost, Roopa comes to his defense and chases the ghost away. But this vengeful ghost is back to take revenge. Will Amarnath be able to save her?
42	"Roopa outsmarts the ghost"
Despite the ghost's attempts, Roopa is rescued from danger. To get rid of the ghost possessing Premlata, Roopa tricks the ghost into entering the lake in a boat. Will the ghost's fear of water drive her away from Premlata's body?
43	"Roopa picks a gangster's call"
While Roopa is thinking of ways to lift Jitender's spirits, she gets an accidental call from a gangster. The oblivious gangster gives her information which prompts her to an idea in helping Jitender reclaim his confidence. Will Roopa's plan work?
44	"Roopa's bizarre demand"
Roopa is shocked when Amarnath reveals Jitender and Suzie's capture to her. To rescue them, Roopa calls the gangster and demands that he ask for ransom for Jitender and Suzie. Will Roopa's bizarre demand confound the gangster?
45	"Amarnath's birthday celebration"
Roopa is very excited about Amarnath's birthday. She encourages the family to organize a children-themed birthday party following his request. Is something going to unfold at this very special birthday celebration?
46	"Premlata won't spare Premnath!"
The elders of the house, Premnath and Premlata, have gotten into an argument, and it does not seem to die down this time. Though Premnath tries to pacify his wife, his innocuous comments only cause the dying argument to escalate. How will he handle the situation now?
47	"Roopa tries to help"
Not bearing to watch her in-laws fight so much, Roopa tries to help Premlata by giving her advice on re-igniting the couple's passion. Will her advice heed any good results?
48	"New trouble for Roopa!"
Roopa's effort to settle Premnath and Premlata's differences suffers an unexpected setback when Premnath's friend, Nirmala, arrives. Premlata gets intensely jealous of seeing her husband's affection towards Nirmala. How will Roopa handle this situation now?
49	"Roopa hatches a new plan"
Premnath invites his college friend Nirmala to stay at his house. This makes Premlata even more insecure and jealous. But Roopa plans to give Premnath a taste of his own medicine by hiring an actor to play the role of Premlata's boyfriend. How will Premnath react?
50	"The Awasthi courthouse"
Premlata's jealousy gets the better of her, and she accuses Premnath of having romantic feelings for Nirmala. Repulsed by this accusation, Premnath decides to divorce Premlata. Dadaji organizes a court within the Awasthi house in a desperate attempt to settle the dispute. What will happen next?
51	"Roopa turns lawyer"
To prevent Premlata and Premnath from going through with the divorce, Roopa becomes a lawyer and requests to fight for both sides. Will Roopa be able to prevent Premnath and Premlata's separation?
52	"Roopa prays for a maid"
The Awasthi family's search for a maid hits a wall when they fail to find a capable person. While the family members are disappointed, Roopa desperately prays for a maid. Will her prayers be answered?
53	"The women are enraged!"
The arrival of the maids creates problems and differences between the men and the women of the Awasthi family. The women get enraged as the men prefer to be serviced by the maids instead of them. How will the ladies solve the crisis?
54	"Roopa's plan backfires"
To get rid of the maids, Roopa comes up with a plan. She decides to frame the maids for stealing and then getting them fired. But, Roopa's calculated plan suddenly takes a hit. Has she ended up framing the wrong person?
55	"Trouble for the Awasthis!"
Kamini and her daughters agree to leave the house after Rajnath offers to sign an exit contract. The Awasthis fall for Kamini's trick as the signed document is revealed to be a marriage contract between Kamini and Rajnath. What does the future hold for the Awasthi family now?
56	"The Awasthi family's brilliant plan"
The Awasthi family comes up with a plan to get rid of Kamini. Based on Amarnath's suggestion, they fake Rajnath's death hoping that it will scare Kamini away. Will the plan work?
57	"Roopa and Amarnath's strategy"
When the plan of faking Rajnath's death fails, Roopa and Amarnath devise a new strategy. They create a rift between Kamini and her daughters, which results in a big altercation. Will this finally force the maids out of the house?
58	"The story behind Amarnath's wedding!"
Premlata gets nostalgic and tells about when Amarnath's marriage was arranged with a girl named Nirupa. But Nirupa is none other than Roopa's sister. How did Amarnath end up marrying Roopa then?
59	"Will Roopa cause trouble?"
Roopa's parents are worried that her clumsiness might cause trouble at Nirupa and Amarnath's wedding. Being in her world, Roopa does not pay any attention to her parents' worries. Will she end up creating more problems for the family?
60	"Amarnath falls unconscious"
When Amarnath decides to show Nirupa around the house, Roopa also joins them. But the house tour soon comes to an abrupt end when Roopa's clumsiness sends Amarnath falling down the stairs and renders him unconscious. Will the family members blame Roopa for the mishap?
61	"Amarnath meets his best friend"
Feeling nostalgic about his childhood, Amarnath visits his school. To his surprise, he meets his childhood friend Mahesh at the school and is shocked to learn that Mahesh, too, is a ghost-like him. What twist and turns will Mahesh bring in Amarnath's life?
62	"Awasthi house is haunted!"
Roopa is furious with Amarnath for bringing his dead friend Mahesh's ghost into the house. Mahesh fuels Roopa's anger when he starts scaring the Awasthi family with some ghostly pranks. How will Roopa pacify the terrified family?
63	"Amarnath in a trap"
The Awasthi family is terrified and convinced that their house is haunted. To prove them wrong, Roopa consults a ghostbuster named Maya. But Roopa's plan fails when Maya traps Amarnath and decides to take him away. What will happen next?
64	"Is Roopa possessed?"
The Awasthi family is shocked at Roopa's strange behavior. Premnath believes that the pressure of excessive household chores is why Roopa's uncanny behavior. Is Roopa under the control of an invisible entity?
65	"Awasthis in for a shock!"
Possessed by Mahesh, Roopa insults every member of the Awasthi family. Unaware of the possession, Roopa's derogatory behavior makes Rajnath furious, and he orders Roopa to leave the house. Will Amarnath come to Roopa's rescue?
66	"Fitness goals for the Awasthi's"
During dinner, Roopa proposes that the family members should join a gym, as she wishes everyone in the family to stay fit and healthy. How will the Awasthi's react to this proposition?
67	"Bad news for Awasthi's"
When the Awasthi family fails to go to the gym, Roopa brings all the necessary gym equipment home. But the workout session turns into a recipe for disaster when Roopa comes across a piece of disturbing news. What is the unfortunate news?
68	"Roopa's life is running out"
All the Awasthi family members, keep replacing each other on the treadmill to prevent the bomb from exploding. When Roopa gets on the treadmill, she decides to sacrifice her life and asks them to get out of the house. Soon, Amarnath informs Roopa of an idea that can save her life. What is Amarnath's plan? Will it work?
69	"The search for Amarnath's insurance papers"
The news of Amarnath's insurance has the whole family searching every nook and corner of the house for it. Their search leads them to discover a shocking letter and a photo of Amarnath. What is the letter about? Will the family be able to find the insurance papers?
70	"A new predicament!"
After retrieving the insurance papers, Amarnath tells Roopa that she should utilize the money to better the family. However, the family finds itself in a predicament as they have to prove that Amarnath is dead to claim the insurance money. How will the family prove it?
71	"A new challenge for the Awasthi's"
Roopa is worried that the family will not receive the insurance money until they submit Amarnath's death certificate. But Jeetendra assures everyone that he will procure the death certificate. How will he manage to do that?
72	"Awasthis to pay the bribe?"
After failing to procure the death certificate, Jeetendra decides to go the illegal way. He finds an agent ready to make a fake death certificate but asks him for a bribe of ten lakhs. Will the Awasthi family agree to pay the huge amount?
73	"Amarnath turns into a dog!"
Fearing Amarnath would be upset by the dog's presence in the house, Roopa decides to get rid of the dog. But Roopa soon receives a shock when she realizes that the dog is none other than Amarnath himself. How did that happen?
74	"Amarnath thrown out of the house"
When Suzie suggests medication for the dog, scared by the injection, the dog bites Suzie. Upset by the dog's actions, the Awasthis throw the dog out of the house, unaware that the dog is none other than Amarnath himself! Can Roopa find a way to bring back Amarnath into the house?
75	"Confusion over Amarnath's identity"
Failing to find the dog, the Awasthi family puts up a 5000 Rupees reward for his return. But multiple reports of similar-looking dogs reach the family leaving them confused. What will they do now? Will Roopa identify the right dog and find Amarnath in the process?
76	"Roopa wants to go to Switzerland"
Roopa expresses her desire to meet the Awasthi family in Switzerland for her summer vacation. After discussing various places for the holiday trip, the family agrees to go to Switzerland. But will the family succeed in going on a vacation?
77	"No trip for the Awasthi's"
The Awasthi family is excited to go to Thailand for their summer holidays. But to their disappointment, their trip is canceled as Premnath's passport has expired. What will they do now?
78	"The Awasthi family's predicament!"
To solve the crisis of waste disposal, Roopa and Premnath convince the municipal corporation to install a garbage bin in their locality. However, a problem arises when the corporation installs the bin right at their doorstep. Why did the people from the corporation do that?
79	"Amarnath guards the garbage bin"
Amarnath decides to guard the garbage bin to stop the people from throwing trash in it. But will he be successful in his initiative?
80	"Roopa's new plan"
When the stubborn officer refuses to move the garbage bin in front of the Awasthi house, Roopa comes up with another plan. Will she finally find a solution to the problem, or will she face disappointment again?
81	"Amarnath to the rescue"
The Awasthi's finally win their battle against the government official and get the garbage bin removed in front of their house. Thanks to Amarnath's clever idea! But what exactly was Amarnath's idea that led to this?
82	"Awasthis on a mission!"
The Awasthis have a task at hand as they get ready to meet Narendranath's prospective wife, who happens to be a foreigner. As part of their preparation, they hire a teacher to learn and master the elegant walking, dressing, and dining style. Will their efforts pay off, or will it lead to chaos?
83	"Ahana arrives a day earlier!"
The Awasthis fail to learn English as their teacher loses his patience with them. Things go from bad to worse when Ahana arrives at their house a day earlier. What scenario will this lead to?
84	"Amarnath's unexpected guest"
Much to the Awasthi family's surprise, an old college friend of Amarnath named Chandni visits them with her son. She is excited about meeting him after a long time. How will Amarnath react to this surprise visit?
85	"Amarnath has a son?"
When Chandni and her son prepare to leave, Rajnath persuades them to stay for another day. At dinner, he reveals to the family that Amarnath is the father of Chandni's son. Is Amarnath the father?
86	"Roopa's aggressive confrontation!"
Roopa's world comes crashing down when she learns about Amarnath's relationship with Chandni and her son. When Amarnath enquires about her foul mood, Roopa gets aggressive and confronts him regarding his relationship with Chandni. How will Amarnath tackle this situation?
87	"Roopa Out Of The Awasthi House"
Roopa is left stunned when the Awasthi family accepts Chandni as the new daughter-in-law of the house. Soon, the family decides to let Roopa go. But as she bids farewell to the family, Amarnath approaches her with a plan to expose Chandni's lie. What is his plan?
88	"Chandni Confesses The Truth"
As Amarnath's instructions, Roopa calls the police home to expose Chandni. Seeing the police officer, Chandni gets nervous and reveals to the Awasthi family the reality of her and Amarnath's meeting in the past. Will Chandni's actions go unpunished?
89	"Where Is Rajnath?"
When the police cannot find Rajnath, Jeetendra takes it upon himself to find his grandfather and bring him home safe. But, can Roopa and Amarnath rely on Jeetendra?
90	"Roopa Knows Jeetendra's Lie"
As the Awasthi family struggles to cope with Rajnath's kidnapping, Amarnath makes a shocking revelation to Roopa. He reveals that Jeetendra himself is the kidnapper and that he is merely trying to prove himself to be a hero. How will Roopa handle this shocking truth?
91	"Roopa Overhears Suzie"
When Rajnath misses his nurse Suzie, he decides to call her. As both of them plan to meet, Roopa overhears their conversation. Will Roopa finally find out where Rajnath is?
92	"Roopa Plans To Bring Back Rajnath"
When Jeetendra's plan to trick Rajnath with the fake news of Premnath's deteriorating health fails, Amarnath advises Roopa of a new plan. Will the move to replace Rajnath with a new Daadaji force Rajnath to return?
93	"Rajnath Is Back"
Upon learning that the family is replacing him with another Dadaji, Rajnath returns home. Much to his relief, he learns that this was just a ruse to bring him back. But little do the family know that a piece of wonderful news awaits them. What is this news?
94	"Confusion Sets In"
When Shalini falls sick due to an upset stomach, the Awasthis mistake her condition for pregnancy. The whole family rejoices as they await the arrival of a new member of their family. Will the joy turn into disappointment when the truth comes out?
95	"Preparing For Pregnancy"
To teach Shalini the nitty-gritty of pregnancy, the women of the Awasthi family don fake pregnancy bellies. Seeing the women help Shalini, even the men decide to take the same road. Will Shalini realize the confusion and reveal the truth?
96	"A Helping Hand For Awasthi's"
Reading about the Vastu Shastra expert in the newspaper, the Awasthi family decides to take his help to solve their problems. The family gets excited when their son-in-law Jimmy reveals that he's a disciple of the Vastu Shastra expert and will help them resolve their issues. Has the Awasthi family fallen victim to a scam?
97	"Roopa Finds The Solution"
Excited by the idea of resolving all her issues, Roopa asks Jimmy for help. Jimmy gives her an amulet and asks her to recite a verse. Will Jimmy's help bear a fruitful result for Roopa?
98	"The Awasthis In Legal Trouble"
To get rid of all their problems through Vastu Shastra, Rajnath decides to cut down the tree in their backyard. But it only lands the family in trouble with the municipality. Can Roopa and Amarnath come to the Awasthi family's rescue again?
99	"Rajnath Is Heartbroken!"
Rajnath is shocked when he learns that Suzie and Narendranath are having an affair. He feels heartbroken and betrayed at the thought of Suzie with someone else. Will this revelation ruin Suzie and Rajnath's relationship?
100	"Rajnath Confides In Roopa"
Rajnath finally gives in to Roopa's persistence and informs her about Narendranath and Suzie's affair. To make Rajnath happy again, Roopa promises to end the couple's affair. What is her plan of action?
101	"Roopa Fails To Stop The Marriage"
Aware that Narendranath and Suzie plan to tie the knot in a temple, Roopa heads there with Rajnath to stop them. But her effort goes in vain, and the duo gets married before her arrival. How will Roopa handle this situation now?
102	"Amarnath Is Jealous Of Roopa!"
Roopa and Amarnath manage to prepare the prasad in the nick of time, saving the family's reputation. When everyone praises Roopa, Amarnath gets infuriated with her. He comes up with a plan to get her kicked out of the house. Will he succeed in his scheme?
103	"A New Car For The Family"
Unable to digest the humiliation of buying a second-hand car, Rajnath vows to buy a new car. Amarnath and Roopa get worried about how will Rajnath fulfill the vow. But, their excitement skyrockets on seeing a brand new expensive car outside their house. Whose car is it? Did Rajnath manage to buy a new car?
104	"Roopa Sells The New Car"
When the Awasthis' obsession with their new car reaches its height, Roopa decides to sell the new car. How will the rest of the family react to Roopa's abrupt action?
105	"Rajnath's Big Day Out"
To put Rajnath's mind off Suzie, Roopa signs him up for fun outdoor activities. After much persuasion, Rajnath agrees to participate in it. But little could the Awasthi family imagine that Rajnath would return home in a completely different avatar. Has Roopa's attempt to help Rajnath backfired?
106	"A New Problem"
Rajnath's sudden transformation into a Sanyasi leaves the family deeply concerned. To resolve the situation, the family men decide to confront the person responsible for this. But instead of resolving it, the men return home as Sanyasis themselves. How will the women handle this situation?
107	"The Sanyasis Face A Challenge"
The women of the Awasthi family come up with a plan to distract the men, who have adopted the lifestyle of Sanyasis. Having failed to distract the men with their beauty and affection, Roopa, Premlata, and Shalini decide to give them a taste of their own medicine. Will they succeed this time?
108	"Roopa's Desperate Attempt"
Roopa's plans do not work as the men of the family refuse to give up the lifestyle of the Sanyasis. Giving it a last shot, Roopa makes the men believe that their Guruji had asked them to walk on the bed of burning coals. Will the men walk on the coals or give up their newly adopted lifestyle?
109	"Rajnath's Birthday Gift"
The women of the Awasthi family come up with a plan to distract the men, who have adopted the lifestyle of Sanyasis. Having failed to distract the men with their beauty and affection, Roopa, Premlata, and Shalini decide to give them a taste of their own medicine. Will they succeed this time?
110	"Roopa Suffers Memory Loss"
Roopa suffers memory loss following a self-inflicted injury. Much to everyone's astonishment, she now thinks that Amarnath is her brother-in-law and that he is still with his first wife. How will the Awasthi family deal with this situation?
111	"One Lie Leads To Another"
Roopa's condition worsens and creates more problems for the family. When Shalini wears a veil and pretends to be Roopa's sister Nirupa, Roopa disapproves and demands that she take the veil off. With Roopa still taking Amarnath to be her brother-in-law, how will the Awasthis handle the situation?
112	"Roopa Finds A Groom"
The Awasthis plan Roopa's wedding, hoping that it will help her regain her memory. But their plan backfires when Roopa agrees to get married and chooses a suitable groom. What will Amarnath and his family do now?
113	"Roopa Is Getting Married Again!"
Amarnath's world comes to a screeching halt when he learns that the Awasthi family has decided to marry off Roopa with Lallan. But, little does he know that the marriage is a part of the Awasthis' plan to bring back Roopa's memory. Will the Awasthis' plan bear fruit?
114	"Battle Of The Sexes"
The women of the Awasthi family complain about the expenses to handle the household chores. The men challenge them to handle the house better than them and take charge of all the chores. Will the men of the Awasthi family be better than the women?
115	"Awasthi Men Lose Money"
The men of the Awasthi family end up spending all the money kept for the household expenses. Desperate to set things straight, they try every trick in the book to earn money but still fail to meet the expenses. Will they finally accept their defeat?
116	"Roopa Under Immense Pressure"
With Premlata away, the entire burden of the household chores falls on Roopa's shoulders. When Shalini refuses to lend a helping hand, Amarnath intervenes and makes Roopa realize that it is unfair. Will Roopa be able to handle everything on her own?
117	"Men Of The House To Be Punished"
Rajnath, Premnath, and Narendra find themselves in trouble after they accidentally step on Shalini's side of the house. As per the rules of the house, the trio is subjected to punishment for trespassing. Will Roopa come to their rescue?
118	"Awasthi Family In A Dangerous Scam"
Jimmy's mannequin business suffers a major setback when the mannequins get destroyed in an accident. He comes up with a clever plan to make the Awasthi family pose as mannequins in front of his client. But the plan fails when the dangerous, gun-wielding client decides to buy Suzie. How will the Awasthi's handle this situation?
119	"Jeetendra Sees The Ghost"
Jeetendra feels bad for Shalini when she complains that no one believes in her ability to see ghosts. In an attempt to understand her situation, Jeetendra prays for the same ability for just one day. His prayer gets answered and he is left stunned when he actually sees Amarnath's ghost. What will happen next?
120	"Amarnath Scares Jeetendra"
When Jeetendra starts to see Amarnath's ghost, Amarnath decides to take advantage of the situation and take revenge on Jeetendra for calling him a repulsive and despicable person. How long will Jeetendra be able to endure Amarnath's torture?
121	"Roopa Decides To End The Fight"
Seeing Premlata and Premnath fight, Roopa's parents suggest them to start watching TV to avoid arguments. But, Premlata and Premnath start fighting over the choice of shows to watch on TV. To avoid any more fights, Roopa buys two TVs. Will Roopa's idea reduce the fights between the couple?
122	"Roopa Resolves The Issue"
Though Roopa has solved the conflict between Premnath and Premlata by buying a new TV, their issues are far from over. Not only have the couple stopped fighting, but they are now giving each other the cold shoulder. How will Roopa bring them closer?
123	"Rajnath To Bring A Guest"
After reading an article in the newspaper, Rajnath desires to invite a guest to bring prosperity and positivity into the house. As soon as he breaks the news to the family, everyone starts to hunt for the prospective guest. How will the search end for the Awasthi family?
124	"Awasthi Family's Guest"
Seeking prosperity, the Awasthis provides shelter to a guest in their house. Aware of their fidelity to the cause, the guest decides to take advantage of the situation. Will the Awasthis' life prosper? Or is the opposite set to happen?
125	"Family Faces Water Shortage"
Right when the Awasthi family breathes a sigh of relief after the guest leaves, a new problem knocks on their door. With no water available, the Awasthis are forced into desperation. What will the family do to acquire water for their survival?
126	"Amarnath Expresses His Angst"
Dejected on not being able to talk to the other family members, Amarnath expresses his angst to Roopa. Will Roopa find a way to let Amarnath interact with the whole family?
127	"Roopa Spills The Beans!"
Amarnath's disappearance makes Roopa worried. Burdened by anxiety and guilt, she reveals to the Awasthi family the truth about Amarnath's death and that she can see and talk to him. Will the Awasthi family believe Roopa?

== Awards ==
Year	Awards	Category	Recipient	References
2018	Gold Awards	Best Actress in Comic Role	Krystle D'Souza	

== See also ==
- List of Hindi comedy shows
