= Khel Khel Mein (2024 film) =

2024 Indian film by Mudassar Aziz

- Theatrical release poster
- Directed by: Mudassar Aziz
- Written by: Sara Bodinar; Mudassar Aziz
- Story by: Mudassar Aziz
- Based on: Perfect Strangers by Paolo Genovese
- Produced by: Bhushan Kumar; Krishan Kumar; Vipul D. Shah; Shashikant Sinha; Ashwin Varde; Rajesh Bahl
- Starring: Akshay Kumar; Taapsee Pannu; Vaani Kapoor; Ammy Virk; Aditya Seal; Pragya Jaiswal; Fardeen Khan
- Cinematography: Manoj Kumar Khatoi
- Edited by: Ninad Khanolkar
- Music by: Score: John Stewart Eduri; Songs: Tanishk Bagchi; Rochak Kohli; Guru Randhawa; Raj Ranjodh
- Production companies: T-Series Films; Wakaoo Films; White World Productions
- Distributed by: Panorama Studios
- Release date: 15 August 2024
- Running time: 134 minutes
- Country: India
- Language: Hindi
- Budget: ₹100 crore
- Box office: est. ₹56.78 crore

Khel Khel Mein (transl. All in fun and games) is a 2024 Indian Hindi-language comedy drama film written and directed by Mudassar Aziz. Based on the 2016 Italian film Perfect Strangers, the film stars Akshay Kumar, Taapsee Pannu, Vaani Kapoor, Ammy Virk, Aditya Seal, Pragya Jaiswal and Fardeen Khan.

Filming was held in Udaipur and London, between October 2023 and March 2024. The film was released on 15 August 2024. Although the film received generally positive reviews from critics, it was a box office failure.

== Plot ==
Three married couples with entirely different personalities, who are also friends, gather at a wedding in Jaipur. Rishabh Malik, a plastic surgeon habituated to lying, is about to get separated from his author wife, Vartika. After the Sangeet ceremony of Vartika's sister, Radhika, the couples decide to play a game. The three couples meet in Rishabh's room where Vartika puts across the rules of the game: everyone will place their cellphones on the table and whoever receives a call, message, or email will have to share the details with the rest of the participants.

Even though the game starts on a funny note, it gradually results in the unraveling of many secrets about each of the participants, and the couples are virtually shocked to learn the hidden facts about each other. All six realise that their real lives are far removed from their make-believe social media and rich lives that they put up for the world to see, leading to more misunderstandings between the couples.

== Cast ==
- Akshay Kumar as Dr. Rishabh Malik, a plastic surgeon
- Taapsee Pannu as Harpreet "Happy" Kaur Sandhu, a social media vlogger
- Vaani Kapoor as Vartika Khanna Malik, a writer
- Ammy Virk as Harpreet Singh Sandhu, an automobile dealer
- Aditya Seal as Samar "Sam" Tanwar, a brand manager
- Pragya Jaiswal as Naina Mehra Tanwar, a boutique owner
- Fardeen Khan as Kabir Deshmukh, a cricket coach
- Ishitta Arun as Malti Mehra, Samar's boss
- Talat Aziz as Gagan Mehra, Naina's father, Samar's boss
- Kiran Kumar as Ranveer Khanna - Vartika and Radhika's father
- Alka Kaushal as Veena Khanna - Vartika and Radhika's mother
- Maahi Raj Jain as Anaya Malik, Rishabh's daughter; Vartika's stepdaughter
- Diljot Chhabra as Radhika Khanna, Vartika's sister
- Gaurav Manwane as Varun, Radhika's fiancé
- Chitrangada Singh as Kadambari Kapoor (special appearance)
- Ananya Panday as Rehana (voice appearance)
- Jimmy Sheirgill as Kabir's brother (voice appearance)
- Arjun Kapoor as Gautam (voice appearance)
- Bhumi Pednekar as Sandhya (voice appearance)
- Aparshakti Khurana as Ricky Ahuja (voice appearance)
- Sunny Singh as Hrithik (voice appearance)

== Production ==
=== Casting ===
Akshay Kumar and Taapsee Pannu were cast as the leads. Later, Fardeen Khan joined the cast marking his return to films after 14 years. Vaani Kapoor, Pragya Jaiswal, Ammy Virk and Aditya Seal were then cast in other prominent roles.

=== Filming ===
Principal photography commenced by October 2023. The film was mainly shot in London and Udaipur before wrapping in April 2024.

== Soundtrack ==
Khel Khel Mein

Soundtrack album by Tanishk Bagchi, Rochak Kohli, Guru Randhawa and Raj Ranjodh
- Released: 13 August 2024
- Genre: Feature film soundtrack
- Length: 17:03
- Language: Hindi
- Label: T-Series

Official audio
- Khel Khel Mein (Audio Jukebox) on YouTube

The music of the film is composed by Tanishk Bagchi, Rochak Kohli, Guru Randhawa and Raj Ranjodh while the background score is composed by John Stewart Eduri. Lyrics are written by Kumaar, Guru Randhawa, Jaani and Raj Ranjodh.

The first single titled "Hauli Hauli" was released on 25 July 2024. The second single titled "Duur Na Karin" was released on 30 July 2024 and is a remake of Nabeel Shaukat Ali's 2016 Punjabi single "Kooch". The third single titled "Do U Know" by Diljit Dosanjh was released on 8 August 2024 which is a remake of Dosanjh's 2016 Punjabi single of the same name.

Track listing
No.	Title	Lyrics	Music	Singer(s)	Length
1.	"Hauli Hauli"	Guru Randhawa	Guru Randhawa	Guru Randhawa, Yo Yo Honey Singh, Neha Kakkar	2:48
2.	"Duur Na Karin"	Kumaar	Tanishk Bagchi	Vishal Mishra, Zahrah S Khan	3:35
3.	"Do U Know"	Jaani	Tanishk Bagchi	Diljit Dosanjh	2:49
4.	"Chal Ve Dilaa"	Kumaar	Rochak Kohli	Vishal Mishra, Rochak Kohli	4:48
5.	"Baari Barsi"	Raj Ranjodh	Raj Ranjodh	Guru Randhawa, Raj Ranjodh	3:03
Total length:					17:03

== Release ==
=== Theatrical ===
Khel Khel Mein was released in theatres on 15 August 2024, coinciding with Independence Day. It was earlier scheduled to release on 6 September 2024 but was preponed.

=== Home media ===
The digital streaming rights for the film were acquired by Netflix. The film began streaming on the platform on 10 October 2024.

== Reception ==
On the review aggregator website Rotten Tomatoes, 78% of 9 critics' reviews are positive, with an average rating of 5.8/10.

A critic for Bollywood Hungama rated the film 3.5 stars out of 5 and wrote, "Khel Khel Mein rests on a novel plot that not only entertains but also boasts of excellent performances." Dhaval Roy of The Times of India rated the film 3.5 stars out of 5 and wrote "Khel Khel Mein has minor flaws, but its smart writing, tight direction, and performances make it worth a watch, especially with a bunch of friends. However, if you get too inspired by this game, do it at your own risk!" Tushar Joshi of India Today rated the film 3.5 stars out of 5 and wrote "Khel Khel Mein is a watchable family entertainer with a message. If you are looking for a clean comedy that doesn’t rely on double-meaning and innuendo-laden one-liners, this is the ticket to buy this Independence Day." Titas Chowdhury of News18 rated the film 3.5 stars out of 5 and wrote "Akshay Kumar is the glue that holds this fun comedy together. Taapsee Pannu emerges as a show stealer."

Sukanya Verma of Rediff.com rated 3/5 stars and notes "The chemistry between the motley bunch of actors works in fits and starts but Akshay Kumar's gift of the gab, Taapsee's bumbling comedienne and Fardeen Khan's dry wit come out tops." Tanmayi Savadi of Times Now rated the film 3 stars out of 5 and wrote "Khel Khel Mein switches between laughs and drama. As a whole product, it is entertaining. With the possibility of a sequel, this one could be a fun ride if watched with an unbiased lens." Vinamra Mathur of Firstpost rated the film 2.5 stars out of 5 and wrote "The film is sadly undone by its second half that suffers from what can be best described as the Mood Swing syndrome. Only people with massive mood swings can relate to the jitteriness of the film’s narrative."

Shubhra Gupta of The Indian Express rated the film 2.5 stars out of 5 and wrote "A little more of the some-men-will never-change just like leopards and their spots would have made this Akshay Kumar-Taapsee Pannu film a no-holds-barred banger." Rishabh Suri of Hindustan Times wrote, "It’s hard to nitpick a flaw in the project, which stars Akshay Kumar, because the film delivers what it promises - a chill time- and more."
