= Wedding Pullav =

2015 Hindi film directed by Binod Pradhan

- Directed by: Binod Pradhan
- Produced by: Shashi Ranjan
- Starring: Rishi Kapoor; Satish Kaushik; Himani Shivpuri; Parmeet Sethi; Upasana Singh; Kitu Gidwani; Sonnalli Seygall; Aru Verma; Tripta Lakhan Pai; Anushka Ranjan; Diganth Manchale
- Cinematography: Gopal Shah
- Edited by: Sayyed Sameer
- Music by: Songs: Salim–Sulaiman; Background Score: Rohit R. Kulkarni
- Production companies: Eros International; GR8 Entertainment
- Distributed by: Eros International
- Release date: 16 October 2015
- Country: India
- Language: Hindi

Wedding Pullav (transl. Wedding pilaf) is an Indian romantic comedy film, directed by Binod Pradhan and produced by Shashi Ranjan and Anu Ranjan. The film stars an ensemble cast featuring Rishi Kapoor, Satish Kaushik, Himani Shivpuri, Parmeet Sethi, Upasana Singh, Kitu Gidwani, Sonnalli Seygall, Aru Verma, Tripta Lakhan Pai, debutant Anushka Ranjan, debutant Kannada actor Diganth, and Karan V. Grover. The film was released on 16 October 2015 to negative reviews.

== Plot ==
Wedding Pullav shows the story of two best friends, Aditya, a.k.a. Adi, and Anushka, who are in love but unaware of it. When Anushka is invited to attend Adi's wedding, this love confusion further increases. On one hand, Adi is jealous of Anushka's boyfriend, while on the other, Anushka does not like Adi's marriage to another girl whom she initially praises. The story then moves to a stage where they know their feelings but are not sure what to do next.

== Cast ==
From the film's opening and closing credits

- Rishi Kapoor as Luv Kapoor
- Satish Kaushik as Adi's father
- Himani Shivpuri as Gulabo
- Parmeet Sethi as Kumar
- Upasana Singh as Adi's mother
- Kitu Gidwani as Amrita
- Sonnalli Seygall as Rhea
- Aru Verma as Petha
- Tripta Lakhan Pai as Beejee
- Anushka Ranjan as Anushka
- Diganth Manchale as Aditya (Adi)
- Karan V. Grover as Jay
- Ali Khan as Batli
- Neha Tomar as Nikki
- Aparna Ghoshal as Shammi
- Radha Khandelwal as Pammi
- Julia Bruchwitz as Roxy
- Sumant Bhatia as Khurana

== Soundtrack ==
Wedding Pullav

Soundtrack album by Salim–Sulaiman
- Released: 17 August 2015
- Recorded: 2015
- Genre: Feature film soundtrack
- Length: 8:29
- Language: Hindi
- Label: Zee Music Company
- Producer: Eros International

Salim–Sulaiman chronology
22 Yards (2014)	Wedding Pullav (2015)	Jai Gangaajal (2016)

All lyrics are written by Irfan Siddiqui; all music is composed by Salim–Sulaiman.

Track list
No.	Title	Singer(s)	Length
1.	"Oh Jaaniya" (Version 1)	Salim Merchant, Shreya Ghoshal, Raj Pandit	04:12
2.	"Party Karni Hai"	Salim Merchant, Apeksha Dandekar
3.	"Naseeba"	Sunidhi Chauhan
4.	"Ishq Da Panga"	Shalmali Kholgade, Vipul Mehta
5.	"Banjaare"	Minal Jain, Digvijay Singh Pariyar
6.	"Lagan Lagi"	Raj Pandit
7.	"Naseeba" (Reprise)	Sreerama Chandra
8.	"The Wedding Pullav"	Salim Merchant, Arijit Singh
9.	"Oh Jaaniya" (Version 2)	Arijit Singh, Shreya Ghoshal	05:05

== Reception ==
=== Critical response ===
Nandini Ramnath of Scroll.in wrote "The insipid writing, functional performances by an ensemble cast that includes Satish Kaushik, Kitu Gidwani and Parmeet Sethi, and contrived emotions add up into a stale serving of a cinematic sub-category that has run its course". Raktim Rajpal from News18 India says "To cut a long story short, ‘Wedding Pullav’ is a stale and boring attempt at storytelling. Stay away from it at all costs". Shubhra Gupta of The Indian Express wrote "However, some credit must be given to ‘Chintuji’ for enacting his bit with absolutely sincerity. The music, which has been composed by Salim Sulaiman, is decent. The title track is the pick of the lot. The same sadly can't be said about the editing. The film's opening sequence as well as its climax feel like a stretch. They could have been shortened".
