= Falak (1988 film) =

1988 film directed by Shashilal K. Nair

- Theatrical release poster
- Directed by: Shashilal K. Nair
- Written by: Salim Khan
- Produced by: V. Sagar Bhagat
- Starring: Raakhee; Jackie Shroff; Madhavi; Shekhar Kapoor; Mohan Bhandari; Supriya Pathak; Sadhana Singh
- Music by: Kalyanji-Anandji
- Release date: 1 April 1988
- Country: India
- Language: Hindi

Falak (transl. Sky) is a 1988 Indian Hindi-language action crime film drama directed by Shashilal K. Nair, produced by V. Sagar Bhagat and written by Salim Khan. The music for the film is composed by Kalyanji-Anandji. It stars Raakhee, Jackie Shroff, Madhavi, Shekhar Kapoor, Mohan Bhandari, Supriya Pathak, Sadhana Singh, Anupam Kher, Paresh Rawal, Kiran Kumar, Vikram Gokhale in pivotal roles.

== Plot ==
A watchman (Ramnath) is killed by his corrupt bosses when the former tries to stop their criminal activities. Years later, Ramnath's sons decides to avenge their father's death.

== Cast ==
- Raakhee as Durga Verma
- Jackie Shroff as Vijay Verma
- Madhavi as Rita D'Souza
- Mohan Bhandari as Advocate Ravi Verma
- Shekhar Kapoor as Inspector Jimmy
- Supriya Pathak as Shobha
- Sadhana Singh as Shanti
- Akash Khurana as Jamnadas
- Anupam Kher as Murlidhar
- Paresh Rawal as R.D. Narang
- Kiran Kumar as Bagga
- Iftekhar as Mr. D'Souza
- Vikram Gokhale as Ramnath Verma
- Ketaki Dave as Julie
- Anang Desai as Doctor
- Murad as Judge
- Vikas Anand as Judge
- Mohan Choti as Mukadam
- Rajan Haksar as Public Prosecutor
- Sharad Vyas as Motwani

== Soundtrack ==
Song	Singer
"Tere Naam Ka, Teri Shakal Ka Dil Mein Ghusa Hai Koi"	Asha Bhosle, Mohammed Aziz
"Oonche Parvatwali Mata"	Mohammed Aziz
"Tumhe Mubarak Yaar"	Mohammed Aziz
"Ek Roz Hansana Hai"	Mohammed Aziz
"Pyar Kiya Tab Hum The, Tum The Aur Dil Tha"	Amit Kumar, Alka Yagnik
