= Kroadh =

- Theatrical release poster
- Directed by: Shashilal K. Nair
- Screenplay by: Vikas Anand
- Dialogues by: Lalit Mahajan
- Story by: Vikas Anand
- Produced by: Pappu Verma
- Starring: Sanjay Dutt; Sunny Deol; Amrita Singh; Sonam; Yashwant Dutt
- Cinematography: Damodar Naidu
- Edited by: Hussain A. Burmawala
- Music by: Laxmikant–Pyarelal
- Production company: Verma Films
- Release date: 23 March 1990
- Running time: 163 minutes
- Country: India
- Language: Hindi

Kroadh (lit. 'Fury') is a 1990 Indian Bollywood action film directed by Shashilal K. Nair. It stars Sanjay Dutt, Sunny Deol, Amrita Singh and Sonam in pivotal roles.

== Plot ==
The story begins with the two brothers living a peaceful life with their policeman father, Inspector Vikram Shukla, and their mother. Their lives are shattered when a notorious criminal named Dharamdas, who is known for kidnapping and assaulting young girls, brutally murders their mother. Their father, Inspector Vikram, arrests Dharamdas, but the witness turns hostile, leading to Dharamdas being set free. The situation escalates, and their father ends up in prison for killing his own brother who was an advocate for the criminals. With their father wrongly imprisoned and their mother dead, the orphaned boys are raised by a kind neighbour.

Ajay, is the elder brother. He is a man driven by a deep sense of justice and a simmering kroadh (fury) against the man who destroyed his family but at the same time he is often the voice of reason, trying to solve problems through logic. The younger brother, Vijay, also carries the same burning anger (kroadh) for vengeance inside him but is more impulsive and prone to take to crime for this purpose.

As they grow up, both Ajay and Vijay are determined to avenge their mother's death, but they only know their killer's name, Dharamdas. This quest for revenge leads them to the underworld of Mumbai, where they become entangled in a conflict between two rival gangs. A major turning point comes when Ajay is arrested and wrongly convicted of murder. Then, one day Vijay comes to meet Ajay in jail, and Ajay tells him to take the path of crime for searching Dharamdas, which Vijay does and soon becomes an underworld criminal.

Meanwhile in jail, Ajay is reunited with his long-lost father, Inspector Vikram Shukla, who is also imprisoned. This period in jail transforms Ajay. He reflects on his life and, with the help of a kind jailor, dedicates himself to reforming and choosing a different path. Upon his release, Ajay's path diverges completely from his brother's. He becomes a police officer, committed. This creates a central conflict in the film: a clash of ideologies between the two brothers, with Ajay now a police officer trying to uphold the law and Vijay a criminal kingpin. Even though, the brothers are now on opposite sides of the law, their ultimate goal — to find Dharamdas — remains the same.

The climax sees the brothers finally discover the true identity of Dharamdas, who has been operating under a different name. Unable to achieve justice through the police system, a frustrated Ajay finally leaves the police force and takes the law into his own hands. The story culminates in a powerful and tragic showdown. Ajay and Vijay finally unite. The brothers confront their nemesis together, but in the ensuing fight, Vijay gets shot by the police.

In a final act of vengeance and brotherhood, Ajay overpowers Dharamdas and douses him with gasoline. He, then, asks mortally wounded Vijay to light a match and set Dharamdas ablaze. Vijay does so and the brothers finally avenge their mother's death. Vijay dies in his brother's arms, leaving a heartbroken Ajay to face the consequences, with a police officer arriving on the scene holding handcuffs, signifying the tragic conclusion of their story.

== Cast ==
- Sanjay Dutt as Vijay Shukla
- Sunny Deol as Ajay Shukla
- Amrita Singh as Matki, Ajay’s girlfriend.
- Sonam as Sonu, Vijay’s girlfriend.
- Anupam Kher as Inspector Vikram Shukla, Ajay and Vijay’s father.
- Paresh Rawal as Awasthi
- Yashwant Dutt as Dharamdas Kumar
- Jagdeep as Mastram
- Rohini Hattangadi as Mrs. Shukla, Ajay and Vijay’s mother.
- Pallavi Joshi as Salma Khan
- Anang Desai as Jailor Aslam Khan
- Vikram Gokhale as Police Commissioner Verma
- Amitabh Bachchan as himself
- Bharat Kapoor as Jailor Gopal
- Deepak Tijori as Henry, Kumar's henchman
- Jack Gaud as Sikander

== Music and soundtrack ==
The music was composed by Laxmikant–Pyarelal and the lyrics of the songs were penned by Anand Bakshi.

Song	Singer
"Na Fankaar Tujhsa"	Mohammed Aziz
"Tera Bhagwan Rakhwala"	Mohammed Aziz
"Pehli Bar Tere Mandir Mein"	Mohammed Aziz
"Bombay Bombay Bombay Bombay Bombay"	Mohammed Aziz, Amit Kumar
