= Fittrat =

2019 Indian romantic drama web series

- Genre: Romance; Drama
- Created by: Ekta Kapoor
- Developed by: Tanveer Bookwala
- Directed by: Santosh Singh
- Creative director: Baljit Singh Chaddha
- Starring: Krystle D'Souza; Aditya Seal; Anushka Ranjan
- Country of origin: India
- Original language: Hindi
- No. of seasons: 1
- No. of episodes: 15

Production
- Executive producer: Mittal Sangle
- Production locations: Mumbai, India
- Cinematography: Anubhav Bansal
- Editor: Unnikrishnan
- Camera setup: Multi-camera
- Running time: 18-23 minutes
- Production company: DING Entertainment

Original release
- Network: ALT Balaji
- Release: 18 October 2019

Fittrat is an Indian romantic drama web series produced by Ekta Kapoor for ALTBalaji. It stars Krystle D'Souza, Aditya Seal and Anushka Ranjan. It started streaming simultaneously on ALT Balaji and ZEE5 on 18 October 2019.

Tarini Bisht is a gold-digger and isn't ashamed of it! She grew up wanting to live the luxe life and own everything that shines. She moves from Dehradun to Delhi, hunting for a ‘honey with money’ with her rich BFF, Amy. But fate is funny... Amy's fiancée Veer Shergill gets obsessed with Tarini, and he decides to win her by hook or by crook. When Amy demands proof of love and friendship, all the blame falls upon Tarini. Hearts & relationships are broken, and drama ensues when she tries to reveal Veer's true intentions. Will Tarini succeed in protecting the friendship that's priceless? Or will Veer be the end of it? Join Tarini's journey as she realises the real value of the gold that lies within and rises to be her own hero. A second season of the show has been reported also with a third season.

== Plot ==
=== Season 1 ===
Tarini Bisht grew up with only one goal in life, to become rich by marrying a rich man. After completing a degree in journalism, she goes to meet her childhood friend Amy who is the daughter of a land Lord to be able to meet rich heirs to marry. She mistakes Amy's fiancé to be her brother Bunty and he becomes obsessed with her. When she rejects his approaches, he creates a rift between her and Amy by making Amy believe that she is after him. Tarini goes back to her dad's house but refusing to accept defeat, she goes back to expose Amy's dad, Veer and Veer's dad of their illegal land deals by joining an upcoming rival media house and is supported by Bunty. However, they buy the media house as well. Veer eventually falls in love with Tarini but she continues to refuse him but gives in at last. She sees the picture of her mother drawn by her father (shown in the beginning as bought by a rich lady and then found dumped at an art gallery by Tarini when she goes to collect evidence against Veer) in his house and gets to know that he bought it for his love for her. Veer decides not to marry Amy and runs away from his wedding to Tarini's house. When Amy's dad finds out about this he sends the police to arrest him for the illegal deals they made. Tarini tells him she never loved him but wanted revenge from him by ruining him but he tells her that she didn't ruin him but he ruined himself for her. She goes back to her dad's home where Amy comes to meet her and when asked by Amy if she ever loved Veer, she says that she loved only Amy who accepted her for who she was and was always a good friend to her. Sometime later Tarini is shown to have become a famous journalist and has become rich from the gold within her.

== Cast ==
=== Main ===
- Krystle D'Souza as Tarini Bisht: Alok's daughter; Amy's best friend; Veer's love
- Aditya Seal as Veer Shergill: Shalini and Suresh's son, Amy's former boyfriend and fiancé; Tarini's love
- Anushka Ranjan as Amrita "Amy" Sareen: Janki and Teckchand's daughter; Bunty's sister; Tarini's best friend; Veer's former fiancé

=== Recurring ===
- Mohit Chauhan as Alok Bisht: Tarini's father; an art teacher
- Babla Kochchar as Suresh Shergill: Veer's father and an ambitious man who becomes a wealthy businessman but wants to become the richest businessman in Delhi.
- Kaizaad Kotwal as Teckchand Sareen: Janki's husband; Amy and Bunty's father.
- Divya Seth as Janki Sareen– Teckchand's wife; Amy and Bunty's mother.
- Aru Krishansh Verma as Gaurav "Bunty" Sareen– Janki and Teckchand's son; Amy's brother; Tarini's namesake boyfriend and Malika's fiancé.
- Priyanka Bhatia as Mallika Kapoor– Pinky and OP's daughter; Bunty's fiancé whom Amy hates and wanted Tarini to replace.
- Kitu Gidwani as Pinky Kapoor– OP's wife; Mallika's mother.
- Govind Pandey as O.P Kapoor– Pinky's husband; Mallika's father.
- Aditya Lal as Arun Aawasthy– CEO of Daily News; Tarini's friend.
- Kumar Kanchan Ghosh as Chaddhaji.

== Soundtrack ==
Fittrat

Soundtrack album by Sandmann
- Released: 18 October 2019
- Recorded: 2019
- Studio: ALT Entertainment
- Genre: Web series soundtrack
- Length: 11:36
- Language: Hindi
- Label: ALT Digital Entertainment
External audio
- Audio Jukebox on YouTube

The soundtrack is composed by Sandmann while the lyrics are written by Akshay Shinde.

Track listing
No.	Title	Singer(s)	Length
1.	"Manmuradein"	Vivek Hariharan, Anusha Mani	3:28
2.	"O Panchi Re"	Vivek Hariharan	2:33
3.	"Paheli Dilli" (Lyrics by Mani Soni)	Sharvi Yadav, Sandmann	1:47
4.	"Naznina" (Lyrics by Mehmood Arafat)	Altamash Faridi, Jonita Gandhi	3:50
