= Hello (TV series) =

2017 Bengali web series

- Genre: Thriller drama
- Directed by: Anirban Mallik, Soumik Chattopadhyay
- Country of origin: India
- Original languages: Bengali; Hindi
- No. of seasons: 3
- No. of episodes: 22

Production
- Production company: SVF

Original release
- Release: 25 September 2017 – present

Hello is a Bengali-language streaming television series streaming on Hoichoi produced by SVF. The series stars Raima Sen, Joy Sengupta and Priyanka Sarkar. In the first scene of this series Raima Sen as Nandita received an MMS from an unknown number showing her husband Ananyo (Joy Sengupta) making love with Nina (Priyanka Sarkar) that turns her life upside down.

== Plot ==
Hello offers a unique blend of drama and psychological thriller. The series revolves around the life of Nina, Nandita, and Anonyo, Nandita's philandering husband. Season 1, of the Hello series, begins when Nandita receives a series of MMS with romantic messages that expose her husband Anonyo's extra-marital affair with Nina. As the mystery thickens, Nandita realizes that the MMS can be aimed at her.

The success of the first installment of the Hello series propels it to Season 2, where all questions get answered, as Anonyo learns that he was manipulated by Nina and that reaching Nandita was Nina's actual aim.

Season 3, of the Hello series, forms to be an excellent conclusive continuation of its past prequels, introducing some new characters. The series will provide new challenges for Nina, Nandita, and Anonyo as they confront their inner demons.

== Cast ==
- Raima Sen as Nandita
- Priyanka Sarkar as Nina / Debalina Som
- Joy Sengupta as Ananyo Bose
- Saheb Bhattacharya as Rongit
- Pamela Singh Bhutoria as Ria
- Ambarish Bhattacharya as Ambarish

== Episodes ==
Series	Episodes	Originally released
1	8	25 September 2017
2	8	29 December 2018
3	12	22 January 2021

== Season 1 (2017) ==
The first season of Hello started streaming in September 2017, and it was hoichoi's first Original content to start streaming on the app and website. It was the debut of Raima Sen in streaming series in Bengali.

== Episodes ==
No.	Title	Directed by	Original release date
1	"You Have One New Message"	Anirban Mallik	25 September 2017
In the very first episode, Nandita’s life changed in a moment when she received an MMS from an unknown number, showing Ananyo making love to Nina.
2	"The Number is Blocked"	Anirban Mallik	25 September 2017
After becoming aware, Ananyo was angered and tries to find the intruder who shot the video. Meanwhile, an unknown person delivers Nandita a gift box which has a finger ring that is not her size.
3	"Try Again Later"	Anirban Mallik	25 September 2017
After receiving the package Ananyo became angry and he accuses Nandita for having a secret affair with the sender of the ring. At the same time, Nandita receives another MMS and learns that the sender of the video name is Debal Shome.
4	"Inbox Full"	Anirban Mallik	25 September 2017
Nandita wanted to catch Ananyo red-handed with Nina so he went to a Puja pandal but in vain. Meanwhile, Nandita keeps getting the series of MMS, which makes her married life even more complicated.
5	"Wrong Number"	Anirban Mallik	25 September 2017
In the process of Sandhya Arati ( A typical ritual in Durga Puja) Nandita saw Nina but barely recognized her. Later when Ananyo came his son finds something written on his palm.
6	"Insufficient Balance"	Anirban Mallik	25 September 2017
Nandita finds a link between the MMS and the mystery about Debol Shome. At that same time Nina is all praises for Nandita which makes Ananyo confused.
7	"Hold the Line"	Anirban Mallik	25 September 2017
Debal Shome asked to meet Nandita in a pub, so she went there. In the pub Nandita noticed Nina, dressed like her.
8	"The line is Busy"	Anirban Mallik	25 September 2017
At that moment Nandita decides to leave. But then something happens, which completely leaves her in shock. Will the mystery behind Debal Shome be solved?

== Season 2 (2018) ==
After a gap of more than one-year hoichoi released the second season of hello with eight episodes. The story begins where it was ended in season 1, The cast remains the same as season 1.

== Episodes ==
No.	Title	Directed by	Original release date
1	"She is Mine"	Soumik Chattopadhyay	29 December 2018
The lives of Ananyo and Nandita took so many turns, In the first episode Nandita finds herself at Nina’s house, where the latter is seen ridiculing Ananyo for judging her wrong.
2	"Belphool"	Soumik Chattopadhyay	29 December 2018
Ananyo and Nandita hurl blame games on each other, meanwhile at the same time they received messages from an unknown number, but this time it was received by Ananyo.
3	"K Eshechilo Ghore"	Soumik Chattopadhyay	29 December 2018
Ananyo is angry about Nandita getting intimate with Nina, because she finds a handkerchief and started to doubt Ananyo for behaving strangely.
4	"Love Liar Loft"	Soumik Chattopadhyay	29 December 2018
After seeing so many unexpected guests at his door, Anonyo is shocked. Will Anonyo’s misdeeds be finally caught?
5	"Laal Lipstick"	Soumik Chattopadhyay	29 December 2018
Ananyo tried to escape the bizarre situations and Nina’s vision, and while escaping he suffers an accident. He don’t have any clue who is trying to trap him.
6	"She is Coming For Us."	Soumik Chattopadhyay	29 December 2018
Ananyo and Nandita start coming close to each other amidst all the complications, but at that time they realized that someone is watching all of their activities.
7	"Lakkhi Thakur Confusing"	Soumik Chattopadhyay	29 December 2018
Ananyo’s family is busy for Lakshmi Puja, meanwhile, some unwanted guests arrived at his place searching for him.
8	"The Story Begins!"	Soumik Chattopadhyay	29 December 2018
While everyone gathers for the puja, Ananyo and Nandita receive messages simultaneously which will change their lives.

== Season 3 (2021) ==
On 22 January 2021 Hoichoi released the third season of the series with twelve new episodes. This time Saheb Bhattacharya and Pamela Bhutoria played an important role in the series.

== Episodes ==
No.	Title	Directed by	Original release date
1	"The Past is Prologue"	Soumik Chattopadhyay	22 January 2021
2	"The Masked Man"	Soumik Chattopadhyay	22 January 2021
3	"The Reunion"	Soumik Chattopadhyay	22 January 2021
4	"Double or Nothing"	Soumik Chattopadhyay	22 January 2021
5	"Trail of Truth"	Soumik Chattopadhyay	22 January 2021
6	"The Festive Fiasco"	Soumik Chattopadhyay	22 January 2021
7	"The Devil In Black"	Soumik Chattopadhyay	5 February 2021
8	"Behind The Bars"	Soumik Chattopadhyay	5 February 2021
9	"Sip Of Sins"	Soumik Chattopadhyay	5 February 2021
10	"Dawn Of Death"	Soumik Chattopadhyay	5 February 2021
11	"A Burden Of Blood"	Soumik Chattopadhyay	5 February 2021
12	"Check Mate"	Soumik Chattopadhyay	5 February 2021
