= One 2 Ka 4 =

2001 Indian film by Shashilal K. Nair

- Poster
- Directed by: Shashilal K. Nair
- Screenplay by: Manoj Lalwani; Raj Kumar Dahima
- Dialogues by: Sanjay Chhel
- Produced by: Nazir Ahmed
- Starring: Shah Rukh Khan; Juhi Chawla; Jackie Shroff
- Cinematography: S. Kumar; Johny Lal
- Edited by: Hussain Burmawala
- Music by: A. R. Rahman
- Production company: Glamour Films
- Distributed by: Dreamz Unlimited
- Release date: 30 March 2001
- Running time: 173 minutes
- Country: India
- Language: Hindi
- Budget: ₹12 crore
- Box office: ₹13.82 crore

One 2 Ka 4 (transl.: One and Two Makes Four) is a 2001 Indian Hindi-language action drama film directed by Shashilal K. Nair. The film stars Shah Rukh Khan, Juhi Chawla, and Jackie Shroff. The soundtrack was composed by A. R. Rahman. The rights of this film are now owned by Khan's Red Chillies Entertainment.

== Plot ==
Two Special Task Force officers, Senior Superintendent of Police Javed Abbas and Assistant Commissioner of Police Arun Verma, are close friends and partners working to capture a powerful drug lord, KKV, who is protected by corrupt officials within the police department. Javed, a widower raising four children, entrusts Arun with their care in case anything happens to him. During a drug raid, Javed is killed by an unknown assailant.

Honoring his friend's last wish, Arun reluctantly takes responsibility for Javed’s children with the help of Geeta, a woman who is secretly working undercover at KKV’s nightclub. As Arun struggles to support the family, he attempts to intimidate KKV but instead becomes entangled in a conspiracy within the police force. After stealing KKV’s illegal money to improve his financial situation, Arun is framed for drug possession and suspended from duty when Geeta testifies against him as part of her undercover role.

Determined to clear his name and uncover the truth behind Javed’s death, Arun investigates the network of corrupt officers working for KKV. His search leads him to suspect several high-ranking officials before the conspiracy is finally traced to the CBI Chief, who has been secretly collaborating with the drug lord.

Arun and Geeta confront the criminals at the airport as the Chief attempts to flee the country. During the confrontation, KKV kills the Chief but is himself shot by Inspector Sawant, who then reveals that he murdered Javed out of resentment. Sawant is defeated, Arun is reinstated in the police force, and he reunites with Javed’s children and marries Geeta.

== Cast ==
- Shah Rukh Khan as ACP Arun Verma
- Juhi Chawla as ACP Geeta Chaudhury
- Jackie Shroff as SSP Javed Abbas
- Nirmal Pandey as Krishan Kant Virmani (KKV)
- Dilip Joshi as Champak
- Raj Zutshi as Sawant
- Akash Khurana as Commissioner of Police
- Keith Stevenson as CBI chief
- Sahila Chadha as Bipasha
- Suresh Chatwal as Inspector Rajendra
- Madhur Mittal as Michael Abbas
- Fatima Sana Shaikh as Abbas' youngest daughter
- M. Rehman Naushad Ali as Broker
- Jack Gaud as Shetty
- Bharat Dabholkar as J. D.

== Soundtrack ==
One 2 Ka 4

Soundtrack album by A. R. Rahman
- Released: 19 February 2001
- Recorded: Panchathan Record Inn
- Genre: Feature film soundtrack
- Length: 41:29
- Label: Saregama (Rewind)
- Producer: A. R. Rahman

A. R. Rahman chronology
Zubeidaa (2000)	One 2 Ka 4 (2001)	Lagaan (2001)

A. R. Rahman composed the soundtrack of the film, with lyrics written by Majrooh Sultanpuri and Mehboob.

Song	Artist(s)	Lyrics	Length	Raga
"Allay Allay"	Sukhwinder Singh and Shaan	Mehboob	05:58	
"Haye Dil Ki Bazi Laga"	Alka Yagnik and Sonu Nigam	Mehboob	04:29	
"Khamoshiyan Gungunane Lagi (Part I)"	Lata Mangeshkar and Sonu Nigam	Mehboob	05:27	Bhairavi (Hindustani)
"Khamoshiyan Gungunane Lagi (Part II)"	Lata Mangeshkar and Sonu Nigam	Mehboob	05:20	Bhairavi (Hindustani)
"I Am Sorry"	Udit Narayan, Srinivas and Poonam Bhatia	Majrooh Sultanpuri	05:31	
"One Two Ka Four"	Clinton Cerejo	Majrooh Sultanpuri	03:29	
"Osaka Muraiya"	Raageshwari and Sonu Nigam	Majrooh Sultanpuri	05:44	
"Sona Nahin Na Sahi"	Alka Yagnik and Udit Narayan	Majrooh Sultanpuri	06:15	

== Reception ==
=== Critical response ===
Taran Adarsh of IndiaFM gave the film one out of five, writing, "On the whole, ONE 2 KA 4 is handicapped by a weak script, despite plus factors it has to its credit (SRK's presence, A.R. Rahman's music, vibrant action). The film has precious little to offer in terms of substance, which will curtail its prospects to a major extent. Disappointing!"

== Box office ==
The film grossed ₹11.20 crore (US$1.2 million) in India and $565,000 (₹2.62 crore) in other countries, for a worldwide total of ₹13.82 crore (US$1.4 million), against its ₹12 crore (US$1.2 million) budget. It had a worldwide opening weekend of ₹4.89 crore (US$510,000), and grossed ₹8.01 crore (US$830,000) in its first week. It is the 21st-highest-grossing film of 2001 worldwide.

=== India ===
It opened on Friday, 30 March 2001, across 260 screens, and earned ₹77 lakh (US$80,000) nett on its opening day. It grossed ₹2.14 crore (US$220,000) nett in its opening weekend, and had a first week of ₹3.71 crore (US$390,000) nett. The film earned a total of ₹6.63 crore (US$690,000) nett, and was declared "disaster" by Box Office India. It is the 20th-highest-grossing film of 2001 in India.

=== Overseas ===
It had an opening weekend of $275,000 (₹1.27 crore) and went on to gross $375,000 (₹1.74 crore) in its first week. The film earned a total of $565,000 (₹2.62 crore) at the end of its theatrical run. Overseas, It is the 12th-highest-grossing film of 2001.
