= Saahil =

Saahil is an Indian given name. Notable people with the name include:

- Saahil Jain (born 1988), Indian cricketer
- Saahil Prem (fl. 2014), Indian actor
