= Parsiana =

Indian magazine for Zoroastrian community

- Editor: Jehangir R. Patel
- Frequency: semi-monthly
- Founder: Dr Pestonji Warden
- Founded: 1964
- Country: India
- Based in: Bombay
- Language: English
- Website: parsiana.com

Parsiana is a semi-monthly magazine written in English and published in Bombay for the Zoroastrian community. The magazine announced it will cease in October 2025 due to lack of funds, dwindling subscribers and no successor to run it.

== History ==
=== 1960-70s ===
Parsiana was founded in Bombay in November 1964 by Pestonji Warden. The magazine covered articles about Zoroastrian religion, its history, customs and traditions, with the tagline "A new medium for old wisdom." The magazine became embroiled in community politics especially when Warden argued with the Bombay Parsi Punchayet (BPP) over the printing of the month at the Godrej Printing Press run by the apex Bombay trust. For some time, it was cyclostyled.[1]

In 1973, Warden sold the publication to the journalist Jehangir Patel. In 1983, ownership of the publication was transferred to Parsiana Publications Private Limited.

=== 1980s ===
Parsiana was the first publication in India to use the prefix Ms when referring to women instead of Miss and Mrs, despite opposition from some readers. It has since dropped both Mr and Ms.

Beginning in 1987, Parsiana published information surrounding community births, marriages, and deaths in the Zoroastrian community in Bombay; as well as sporadic data received from outstation sources. In 1988, it published data on interfaith marriages in Bombay which proved highly controversial. There was a public outcry as a taboo had been broken.

=== Other publications ===
The Parsiana Book Of Iranian Names was first published by Parsiana in 1978. The names were compiled by the late Avesta and Pahlavi scholar Ervad Jamshed Katrak.

In 2005, Parsiana published Judgments, a compilation of judgements delivered in legal cases on the Zoroastrian community.

Parsiana started a website in 2002 which carried extracts from the magazine. Beginning in December 2012, the entire contents of Parsiana issues have been published online.
