= Harvest (play) =

1997 play by Manjula Padmanabhan

- Written by: Manjula Padmanabhan
- First publication: 1997
- Genre: Science Fiction
- Setting: Mumbai

Harvest is a futuristic dystopian play by Manjula Padmanabhan set in Mumbai, with poverty-stricken Indians engaged in a system of organ-selling with the affluent West. It was first published in 1997 by Kali for Women.

Harvest won the 1997 Onassis Prize as the best new international play. The playtext was included in Black and Asian Plays, published by Aurora Metro Books in 2000.

== Setting and Plot Summary ==
The setting is what was then called Bombay, in the year 2010. Om Prakash, an unemployed Indian man with a family to support, agrees to sell unspecified organs through a deliberately vague system called InterPlanta Services Inc. to anyone in need of it in the vast unspecified West in exchange of a small fortune. InterPlanta and the recipients are obsessed with maintaining Om's health and invasively control the lives of Om, his mother Ma, and his wife Jaya in their one-room apartment through providing "supplements" and pills and a separate washroom in place of the common washroom used by all members of the apartment building. The recipient, Ginni, periodically looks in on the Prakash family via videophone and treats them condescendingly. In the end, it is Jeetu, Om's brother and a male prostitute whose "defiled" and diseased body is chosen and the audience learns that the plan all along was to create a new body using Jeetu's youth in order to virtually impregnate Om's spirited young wife, Jaya, who had an extra-marital affair with Jeetu. Harvest depicts Third World human bodies as crops to be "harvested" for the consumption of the industrialized and technologized West, through bioprospecting by western multinationals.

== Themes ==
Padmanabhan explores scenarios where human bodies are assembled and disassembled as commodities and ultimately fused with machines. Human resources are genetically manipulated for profit maximization by seed giants of questionable motives, like InterPlanta Services.

Posthuman identities such as cyborgs, androids and the disembodied existence in cyberspace have been invoked to challenge the hegemony of a patriarchal and corporate capitalist order and Padmanabhan uses the emancipatory role of exo-physical birthing technology to create at the end of the play, a cyborg which is made of the flesh of Jeetu and the soul of a decrepit old man named Virgil, who tries to impregnate Jaya with his seed, albeit virtually.

Padmanabhan employs Donna Harroway's "A Cyborg Manifesto" to lay emphasis on the technologized body as a political category. Padmanabhan's third world narrative strives to portray the crushing power of mechanically-aided global capitalism that tries to patent ingenious knowledge and colonize organic resources and bodies.

== Characters ==
=== Donors ===
- Om Prakash, the "donor" who has been laid off from his job as a clerk and is the primary breadwinner of the family
- Jaya, Om's spirited and fierce young wife, who resists the claims of Virgil over her womb and physical body
- Ma, Om's aged mother who is hyperfixated on gadgets like the TV sent by InterPlanta services and ultimately becomes a literal "couch potato" as she inserts herself into the luxury television capsule
- Jeetu, Om's younger brother, a male prostitute who has an affair with Jaya

=== Receivers ===
- Ginni, the epitome of western beauty with blonde hair who is a virtual simulation and interacts with the Prakash family through a "module"
- Virgil, the proprietor of Jeetu's physical body who plans to create offsrping by impregnating Jaya virtually

Other characters include the Guards and Agents, "unsmiling and efficient", Bidyut Bai, an aged neighbor, and unspecified urchins who crowd at the door of the apartment.

== Reception ==
Backstage reviewed a production of the play, describing it as "... a fascinating, funny, and frightening glimpse of what happens when we commodify human beings." India Today wrote in 1998 "Savage, swiftian and with humour so black that what little laughter it provokes is painful, Manjula Padmanabhan's award-winning play is really an allegory about relationships." The New York Times reviewed a 2006 production of the play in New York City, writing that while the play was "well written" with an "engaging premise," it did not "totally deliver," in part because the plot grew too complicated.
