= Joy Sengupta =

Indian actor and model (b. 1968)

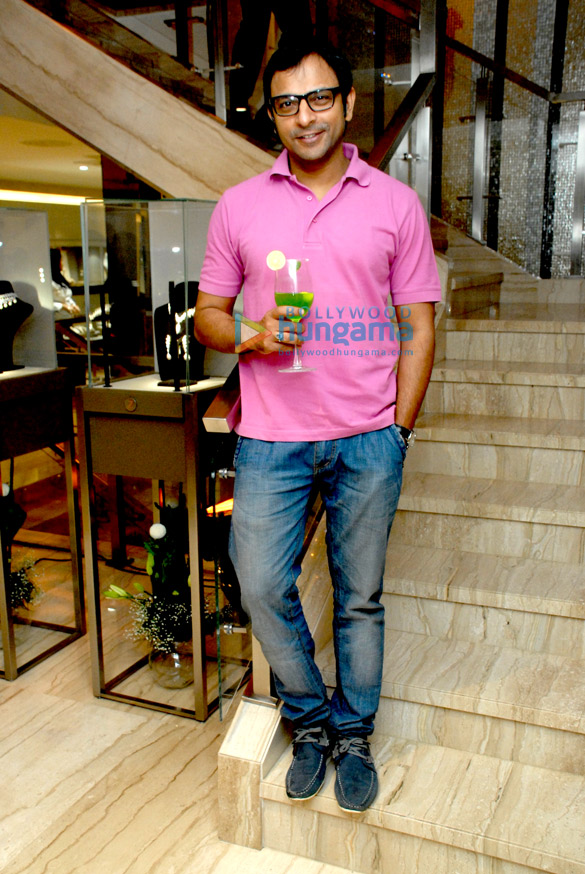
- Sengupta in 2015
- Born: Kolkata, West Bengal, India
- Occupations: Actor; dubbing artist

Joy Sengupta is an Indian film and stage actor works Hindi and Bengali films and theatre. He is best known for his debut feature, Hazaar Chaurasi Ki Maa (1998) directed by Govind Nihalani.

== Personal life ==
Sengupta was born in Kolkata, West Bengal, India and grew up in Delhi and Nepal. He completed his graduation in English Literature from Delhi University. During this period, he joined Jana Natya Manch, a theatre group based in Delhi. Thereafter, he received a Diploma in Drama from the Living Theatre Academy, New Delhi, where he studied under Ebrahim Alkazi. After working in theatre, telefilms and television series in Delhi, Sengupta shifted to Mumbai in 1997.

== Career ==
Sengupta starred in Hazaar Chaurasi Ki Maa (1998), a film by Govind Nihalani. Thereafter, Sengupta starred in a number of films such as Good Boy Bad Boy (2007), Shakal Pe Mat Ja (2011), Hate Story (2012), and Deham, also directed by Govind Nihalani. Over the years, he has worked with theatre directors such as Habib Tanvir, Safdar Hashmi, Barry John, Feroz Abbas Khan, Ramu Ramanathan and Lillete Dubey.

He married a former model, Tara, in 2006. He is the voice of Chris Evans as Captain America in the Marvel Cinematic Universe, with Captain America: Civil War being an exception.

== Filmography ==
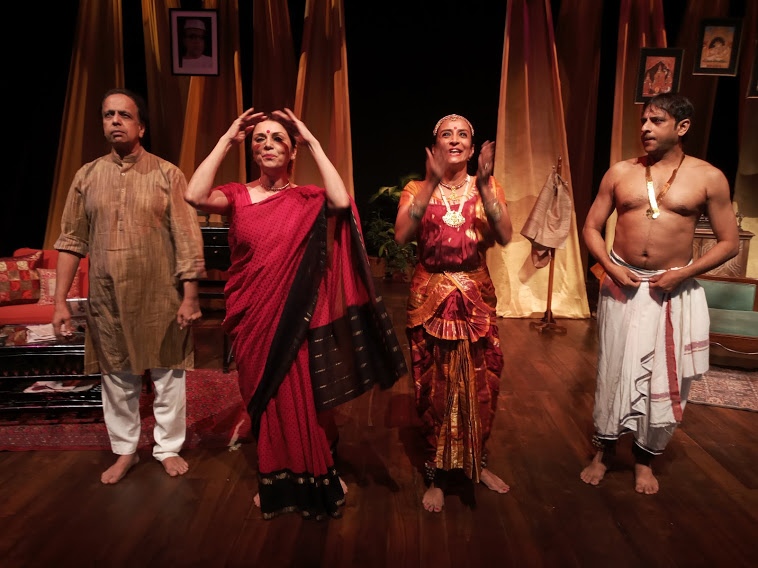
"Dance like a Man" performance with cast, Ananth Mahadevan, Lillete Dubey, Suchitra Pillai & Joy Sengupta, at Prithvi Theatre, 2021.

=== Film ===
- Hazaar Chaurasi Ki Maa (1998) as Brati Chatterjee
- Deham (2001) as Om Prakash
- Bhalo Theko (2003) as Babua Shine
- Patalghar (2003) as Dr. Bhootnath Nandy
- Jara Bristite Bhijechhilo (2007) as Arani Sen
- Good Boy Bad Boy (2007) as Quiz Contest Anchor
- 68 Pages (2007) as Kiran
- Chaturanga (2008) as Shribilash
- Aladin (2009) as Arun Chatterjee
- Anjaana Anjaani (2010) as Deven
- Shakal Pe Mat Ja (2011) as Officer Thomas
- Kagojer Bou (2011) as Subimal
- Hate Story (2012) as Rajdev Singh
- Tabe Tai Hok (2012) as Amartya
- Bhopal: A Prayer for Rain (2014) as Roy
- Children of War (2014) as Sudipto
- Path Ghat (2014)
- Teenkahon (2015) as Sukomol Basu Roy
- RoughBook (2016)
- Parobash (2016)
- Kanyadaan (2017) as Arun Athavle
- Bilu Rakkhosh (2017) as Bilu
- Biday Byomkesh (2018) as Abhimanyu Bakshi
- Lubdh (2018)
- Kia and Cosmos (2019) as Kabir Chatterjee
- Jhalki (2019) as SDM Akhilesh
- Bhalo Maye Kharap Maye (2019) as Samiran Sen
- Class of '83 (2020) as DGP Raghav Desai
- Ebhabei Golpo Hok (2020) as Abhijit Mukherjee
- Antardwanda (2021) as Ridhwiman Chatterjee
- Trittiyo (2022)
- Datta (2023) as Naren
- Sedin Kuyasha Chilo (2024) as
- Khelaghar Bandhte Legechi (2024) as Amitava Mukherjee
- Aprokashito (2024) as Amit Dutta
- Mon Potongo (2024) as Amitabha
- Phule (2025) as Vinayak Deshpande
- Do Deewane Seher Mein (2026)

=== Television ===
- Waaris
- X Zone (1998-2000)
- Kucchh Pal Saath Tumhara * X Zone (2003)
- Aarambh (2017)
- Hello (2017) as Ananyo
- Hello Mini (2019-2020) as Mini's Boss
- Sacred Games (2019) as Mathur
- Poison 2 (2020) as Home Secretary
- Feels like Ishq (2021) as Interviewer
- The Whistleblower (2021) as Naveen Moitra
- Search (2022) as Soumyadeep
- Inspector Avinash (2023) as Debashish Dasgupta
- Gentlemen (2023) as Shilajit
- The Night Manager (2023) as Danish Khan
- Crime Patrol (2023) as Inspector Rakesh Shrivastava
- Raisinghani vs Raisinghani (2024) as Dev Raisinghani
- Black Warrant (2025) as JP Singh
- Professor Sengupta (2025) as Anirban Sengupta
- Made In India: A Titan Story (2026) as SK Gopalan

== Dubbing roles ==
=== Live action series ===
Title	Actor	Character	Dub language	Original language	Number of episodes	Dub year airdate	Original airdate
Stranger Things	Sean Astin	Bob Newby	Hindi	English	25	2016–present	2016–present

=== Live action films ===
==== Hollywood films ====
Film title	Actor	Character	Dub language	Original language	Original year release	Dub year release	Notes
2012	Tom McCarthy	Gordan	Hindi	English	2009	2009	
Prince of Persia: The Sands of Time	Toby Kebbell	Prince Garsiv	Hindi	English	2010	2010	
Captain America: The First Avenger	Chris Evans	Steve Rogers / Captain America	Hindi	English	2011	2011	
The Avengers	Chris Evans	Steve Rogers / Captain America	Hindi	English	2012	2012	
Thor: The Dark World	Chris Evans	Steve Rogers / Captain America	Hindi	English	2013	2013	
Captain America: The Winter Soldier	Chris Evans	Steve Rogers / Captain America	Hindi	English	2014	2014	
Avengers: Age of Ultron	Chris Evans	Steve Rogers / Captain America	Hindi	English	2015	2015	
Ant-Man	Chris Evans	Steve Rogers / Captain America	Hindi	English	2015	2015	
Spider-Man: Homecoming	Chris Evans	Steve Rogers / Captain America	Hindi	English	2017	2017	
Avengers: Infinity War	Chris Evans	Steve Rogers / Captain America	Hindi	English	2018	2018	
Captain Marvel	Chris Evans	Steve Rogers / Captain America	Hindi	English	2019	2019	
Avengers: Endgame	Chris Evans	Steve Rogers / Captain America	Hindi	English	2019	2019	
The Gray Man	Chris Evans	Lloyd Hansen	Hindi	English	2022	2022	

==== Indian films ====
Film title	Actor	Character	Dub language	Original language	Original year release	Dub year release	Notes
Jagame Thandhiram	Sharath Ravi	Vicky	Hindi	Tamil	2021	2021	

== See also ==
- Dubbing (filmmaking)
- List of Indian Dubbing Artists
