= Krystle D'Souza =

Indian actress

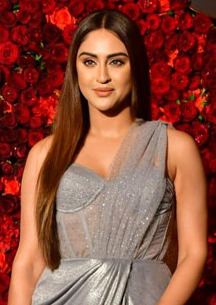
- D'Souza in 2023
- Born: 1 March 1990 (age 36); Mumbai, Maharashtra, India
- Occupation: Actress
- Years active: 2007–present

Krystle D'Souza (born 1 March 1990) is an Indian actress who primarily works in Hindi television. D'Souza is a recipient of several awards including one ITA Award and two Gold Awards. D'Souza made her acting debut in Kahe Naa Kahe. She is known for her roles in Ek Hazaaron Mein Meri Behna Hai, Brahmarakshas and Belan Wali Bahu. D'Souza further expanded to web with Fittrat and Hindi films with Chehre.

== Early life ==
D'Souza was born on 1 March 1990 in Mumbai into a Christian family. She considers herself deeply religious.

== Career ==
D'Souza started her acting career in college, and then was cast for Kahe Naa Kahe in 2007. She then appeared in Kya Dill Mein Hai as Tamanna. In 2008, she appeared in Star Plus's Kasturi as Navneet and Kis Desh Mein Hai Meraa Dil as Veera.

In 2010, D'Souza appeared in Sony TV's Baat Hamari Pakki Hai as Tara. She also had a cameo appearance in Sony TV's Aahat and played Yamini in the same year.

In 2011, she portrayed Jeevika Vadhera in Ek Hazaaron Mein Meri Behna Hai opposite Karan Tacker. The show went off air on 13 September 2013.

In December 2013, she signed Sony TV's Ekk Nayi Pehchaan, playing Sakshi opposite Karan Sharma. The show went off the air in September 2014.

In 2016, she returned to television playing Raina in Ekta Kapoor's Brahmarakshas which aired on Zee TV. The show went off air in February 2017. In February 2017, she appeared in Lakme Fashion Week.

In 2018, D'Souza played Roopa in Colors TV's Belan Wali Bahu. For her performance, she won the Gold Award for Best Actress in Comic Role.

Currently, she is seen in ALT Balaji's Fittrat.

She also appeared in Colors TV's Mirchi Top 20 opposite Karan Tacker in 2015, 2016 & 2017.

== In the media ==
D'Souza was ranked 19th in the 50 Sexiest Asian Women List by Eastern Eye in 2013. In Times Most Desirable Women on Television list, D'Souza was placed 5th in 2017 and 2018, and 15th in 2019.

== Filmography ==
Key
| † | Denotes films that have not yet been released |

=== Films ===
| Year | Title | Role | Notes | Ref. |
|---|---|---|---|---|
| 2008 | C Kkompany | Herself | Special appearance | |
| 2021 | Chehre | Natasha Oswal | | |
| 2024 | Visfot | Lucky | | |
| 2025 | Dhurandhar | Dancer in the song "Shararat" | Special appearance | |
| TBA | Jaageer † | TBA | Filming | |

=== Television ===
| Year | Title | Role | Notes | Ref. |
|---|---|---|---|---|
| 2007 | Kahe Naa Kahe | Kinjal Pandey | | |
| 2007–2008 | Kya Dill Mein Hai | Tamanna Punj | | |
| 2008 | Kasturi | Navneet Chawla | | |
| 2009 | Saat Phere: Saloni Ka Safar | Sara | | |
| 2008–2009 | Kis Desh Mein Hai Meraa Dil | Veera Juneja | | |
| 2010 | Baat Hamari Pakki Hai | Tara | | |
| 2010 | Aahat | Yamini / Mallika | | |
| 2011–2013 | Ek Hazaaron Mein Meri Behna Hai | Jeevika Chaudhary Singh Vadhera | | |
| 2011 | Yeh Rishta Kya Kehlata Hai | Jeevika Chaudhary Singh Vadhera | Guest appearance | |
| 2011 | Iss Pyaar Ko Kya Naam Doon? | Jeevika Chaudhary Singh Vadhera | Guest appearance | |
| 2012 | Saath Nibhaana Saathiya | Jeevika Chaudhary Singh Vadhera | Guest appearance | |
| 2012 | Diya Aur Baati Hum | Jeevika Chaudhary Singh Vadhera | Guest appearance | |
| 2013 | Pyaar Ka Dard Hai Meetha Meetha Pyaara Pyaara | Jeevika Chaudhary Singh Vadhera | Guest appearance | |
| 2013–2014 | Ekk Nayi Pehchaan | Sakshi Modi | | |
| 2014 | Bade Achhe Lagte Hain | Sakshi Modi | Guest appearance | |
| 2014 | Jhalak Dikhhla Jaa 7 | Contestant | Guest appearance | |
| 2014 | Box Cricket League | Contestant | | |
| 2015 | Comedy Classes | Herself | Guest appearance | |
| 2015 | Sarojini - Ek Nayi Pehal | Herself | Guest appearance | |
| 2016; 2020 | Kumkum Bhagya | Herself | Guest appearance | |
| 2016; 2020 | Kumkum Bhagya | Herself | Diwali Special | |
| 2016–2017 | Brahmarakshas-Jaag Utha Shaitaan | Raina Sharma Srivastava | | |
| 2017 | The Voice India 2 | Herself | Guest appearance | |
| 2018 | Bigg Boss 11 | Herself | Guest appearance | |
| 2018 | Belan Wali Bahu | Roopa Awasthi | | |
| 2018 | Dil Se Dil Tak | Roopa Awasthi | Guest appearance | |
| 2018 | Shakti - Astitva Ke Ehsaas Ki | Roopa Awasthi | Guest appearance | |
| 2018 | Kundali Bhagya | Herself | Guest appearance | |
| 2018 | Udaan | Herself | Guest appearance | |
| 2018 | Naagin 3 | Herself | Guest appearance | |
| 2019 | MTV Ace Of Space 2 | Herself | Guest appearance | |
| 2020 | Pinjara Khubsurti Ka | Herself | Guest appearance | |
| 2024 | Laughter Chefs – Unlimited Entertainment | Herself | Guest appearance | |

=== Web series ===
| Year | Title | Role | Notes | Ref. |
|---|---|---|---|---|
| 2019 | Fittrat | Tarini Bisht | | |
| 2025 | First Copy | Mona | | |
| 2026 | The Traitors India 2 | Contestant | Winner | |

=== Music videos ===
| Year | Title | Singer | Ref. |
|---|---|---|---|
| 2018 | I Need Ya | Sukhe | |

== Awards and nominations ==
| Year | Award | Category | Work | Result | Ref. |
|---|---|---|---|---|---|
| 2012 | Gold Awards | Most Fit Actor – Female | —N/a | Won | |
| 2012 | Indian Television Academy Awards | Best Actress – Jury | Ek Hazaaron Mein Meri Behna Hai | Nominated | |
| 2014 | Indian Telly Awards | Best Actress in a Lead Role | Ekk Nayi Pehchaan | Nominated | |
| 2014 | Gold Awards | Most Fit Actor – Female | —N/a | Nominated | |
| 2015 | Indian Television Academy Awards | Most Stylish Actress | —N/a | Won | |
| 2018 | Gold Awards | Style Diva | —N/a | Nominated | |
| 2018 | Gold Awards | Most Fit Actor – Female | —N/a | Nominated | |
| 2018 | Gold Awards | Best Actress in a Comic Role | Belan Wali Bahu | Won | |
