= Main Lakshmi Tere Aangan Ki =

Indian television series

- Created by: Sumeet Hukamchand Mittal; Shashi Mittal
- Written by: Shashi Mittal; Dilip Jha; Archita Biswas Jha; Shobhit Jaiswal; Meenal Jaiswal
- Directed by: Jai Singh; Rishi Tyagi
- Starring: See Below
- Country of origin: India
- Original language: Hindi
- No. of episodes: 258

Production
- Producers: Shashi Mittal; Sumeet Hukamchand Mittal
- Production location: Kanpur
- Cinematography: Sudesh Kotian
- Running time: 21 minutes approx.
- Production company: Shashi Sumeet Productions

Original release
- Network: Life OK
- Release: 19 December 2011 – 21 October 2012

Related
- Dream Girl (TV series)

Main Lakshmi Tere Aangan Ki is an Indian television series that aired on Life OK from 19 December 2011 to 21 October 2012. It stars Shraddha Arya and Sudeep Sahir. The show jumps forward eight years where Lakshmi dies giving birth to a baby girl, and the show takes another seven-year time jump and focuses on the life of Kanchi, Lakshmi's lookalike.

A sequel titled Dream Girl started airing on 9 March 2015 on Life OK.

== Synopsis ==
Lakshmi, a middle-class young girl aims at earning money as her mom died of pneumonia and they failed to afford her treatment. At the age of 9, she has a crush on and wishes to marry Arjun Agnihotri but he moves to London for 10 years to complete his studies.

=== 12 years later ===
Arjun returns to India, in disguise of Ajay Sharma. He meets and also falls in love with Lakshmi, knowing about her crush of marrying him. As she learns Ajay is Arjun, Lakshmi proposes to him. Eventually he also confesses his feelings and they marry but Lakshmi feels neglected, misunderstanding that Arjun loves his former fiancée Saumya, so she leaves him.

=== 3 months later ===
As Lakshmi uncovers the past truth, Arjun forgives her and helps family to get her back. Saumya is exposed to be only wanting Arjun's money and leaves. Arjun and Lakshmi get remarried.

=== 1 year later ===
Arjun and Lakshmi have a daughter Jiyana, whom Lakshmi gave birth to before dying. She knew about her pregnancy complications but never informed Arjun.

=== 7 years later ===
Lakshmi's lookalike Kaanchi Kashyap is introduced. Jiyana is now 8 is raised by Arjun. Astonished that Kaanchi looks like Lakshmi, she brings her to see Arjun under pretext of bringing a delivery. In time, Arjun and Kaanchi fall in love. They confess their love.

== Cast ==
=== Main ===
- Shraddha Arya as
  - Lakshmi Agnihotri – Saraswati's sister; Arjun's first wife, Jiyana's mother. (2011–2012)
  - Kaanchi Kashyap – Arjun's love interest, third wife, Jiyana’s step-mother (2012)
- Sudeep Sahir as Arjun Agnihotri, Soumya’s husband (later divorced), Lakshmi's widower, Jiyana's father. Kaanchi's love interest, husband. (2011–2012)

=== Recurring ===
- Aadesh Chaudhary as Aditya
- Nisha Rawal as Soumya Diwan/ Arjun’s second wife
- Abhishek Tiwari/Anuj Thakur as Ajay Agnihotri/Saravana
- Gurpreet Kaur as Swati
- Heena Parmar as Saraswati Vishal Chaturvedi-elder sister of Lakshmi.Wife of Vishal Chaturvedi.Massi of Jiyana.
- Anshul Trivedi as Vishal Chaturvedi
- Ajay Arya/Dishank Arora as Akaash Agnihotri
- Aruna Irani as Dadiji
- Anil Dhawan as Lakshmi's father
- Vinny Arora as Ginnu
- Pallavi Rao as Kishori
- Aarya Rawal as Renuka Agnihotri
- Arbaaz Ali Khan as Rajvardhan Agnihotri
- Simran Khanna as Purva
- Roshni Walia as Jiyana Agnihotri-Lakshmi and Arjun's daughter
- Dinesh Kaushik
- Ali Zafar as Nikhil (cameo)
- Madhuri Dixit (special appearance for Lakshmi's marriage)
- Malaika Arora (special appearance for Lakshmi's marriage)
