= Nikita Dutta =

Indian actress (born 1991)

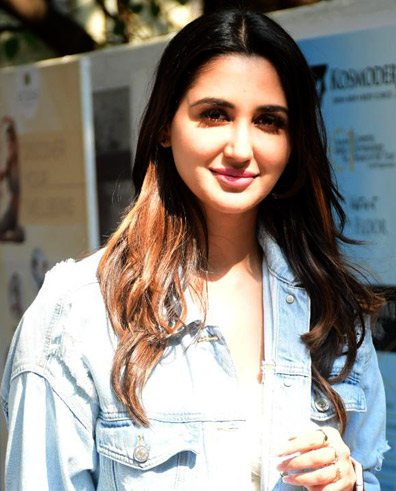
- Dutta in 2024
- Born: Delhi, India
- Education: St. Xavier's College, Mumbai
- Occupation: Actress
- Years active: 2014–present

Nikita Dutta is an Indian actress who primarily works in Hindi films and television. After participating in Femina Miss India 2012, she made her acting debut with the romantic drama Lekar Hum Deewana Dil (2014). Dutta made her television debut with Dream Girl (2015) and achieved recognition with Ek Duje Ke Vaaste (2016).

Dutta returned to films with the sports film Gold (2018) and then appeared in the romantic drama Kabir Singh (2019). Dutta has since portrayed the leading lady in the crime drama The Big Bull, the supernatural horror Dybbuk, both in (2021) and the web series Khakee: The Bihar Chapter (2022).

== Early life ==
Dutta's father is a retired rear admiral of the Indian Navy. She has spent most of her childhood in Visakhapatnam and Mumbai. She has completed her graduation in Economics from St. Xavier's College, Mumbai.

== Career ==
=== Debut and success in television (2012-2018) ===
Dutta participated in Femina Miss India 2012 and was one of the finalists. Dutta made her acting debut with the romantic comedy Lekar Hum Deewana Dil in 2014. The film was a commercial failure. She played a sweet and smart girl opposite Sudeep Sahir.

Dutta made her television debut in 2015 with Dream Girl. She played Lakshmi, an aspiring actress opposite Mohsin Khan. She quit the show in November 2015. Dutta's career marked a turning point with her portrayal of a strong-headed woman Suman in Ek Duje Ke Vaaste opposite Namik Paul. The show culminated in October the same year. From 2017 to 2018, she played a lawyer opposite Zayed Khan and Vatsal Sheth in Haasil. The show marked her last TV appearance.

=== Film comeback and further career (2018-2021) ===
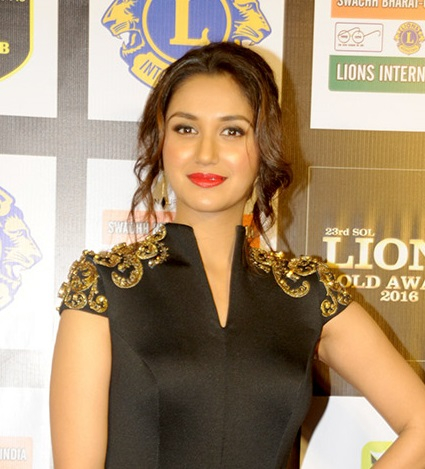
Dutta at an event

Dutta returned to films in 2018 with the sport film Gold opposite Akshay Kumar . With global earnings of ₹1.5 billion, Gold emerged as a commercial success. Bollywood Hungama noted, "Nikita Dutta is cute and does fine." The same year, Dutta appeared opposite Neil Bhoopalam, in Zoya Akhtar's segment of the anthology film Lust Stories. The film met with positive reviews from critics.

In 2019, Dutta made her web debut with MX Player's Aafat, portraying the role of Titli, a divorcee. In the same year, she portrayed a film actress in the romantic drama Kabir Singh, opposite Shahid Kapoor. It received mixed reviews but became the 26th highest-grossing Indian film of all time, grossing more than ₹3.7 billion (US$38 million) worldwide. Bollywood Hungama found her "sweet" in the supporting role.

In 2020, Dutta portrayed an aspiring actor opposite Prit Kamani in Maska. India Today stated that she "stands out", among the young actors. Firstpost noted, "Dutta does the struggling actor representation quite well, but her character is given the shorter end of the stick."

Dutta had two releases in 2021. She first portrayed a housewife opposite Abhishek Bachchan in The Big Bull, a fictionalised biographical film about 1992 stock market scam accused broker Harshad Mehta. Deccan Herald wrote, "Nikita tries to add some life to a one-dimensional character but this counts for little in the larger scheme of things." She next portrayed a pregnant woman opposite Emraan Hashmi in the supernatural horror Dybbuk. Rediff.com found her to be "strictly okay", while The Week wrote, "With her performances, Nikita has sustained the aura of fear."

=== Recent work and expansion (2022-present) ===
In 2022, Dutta appeared opposite Aditya Seal in the musical supernatural comedy Rocket Gang. Times of India noted, "Nikita Dutta fits right in but her on-screen chemistry with Aditya Seal falls flat." She also portrayed a resolute wife opposite Karan Tacker in the web series Khakee: The Bihar Chapter. The Telegraph noted, "Nikita Dutta as Tanu, turn in an impressive performances despite little screen time."

Dutta played a medical student opposite Ehan Bhat in her first release of 2024, Dange. Titas Chowdhury of News18 noted, "Nikita Dutta as Rishika impresses. Her Rishika is no nonsense, sometimes loud and still holds a lot of empathy."

Dutta made her Marathi film debut with Gharat Ganpati in 2024 which received a lot of positive reviews.

== Media image ==
The Tribune noted, "Dutta has slowly but effectively managed to grab eyeballs with her work." She has also done charity work with "Hemkunt Foundation", during COVID-19 and has walked the ramp for "Global Peace Initiative". Dutta is a celebrity endorser for brands and products including White Tone and Malabar Gold and Diamonds.

== Filmography ==
=== Films ===
Key
†	Denotes films that have not yet been released

- All films are in Hindi, unless otherwise noted.

Year	Title	Role	Notes	Ref.
2014	Lekar Hum Deewana Dil	Rose		
2018	Gold	Simran		
2018	Lust Stories	Rukmini Sonkari	Zoya Akhtar's segment	
2019	Kabir Singh	Jiah Sharma		
2020	Maska	Mallika Chopra		
2021	The Big Bull	Priya Patel Sha		
2021	Dybbuk	Mahi Isaac (Nee 'Sood')		
2022	Rocket Gang	Tania		
2024	Dange	Rishika "Rish"		
2024	Gharat Ganpati	Kriti Ahuja	Marathi film	
2025	Jewel Thief	Farah	Netflix film	
TBA	Gul Gule Bakawali †	TBA	Post-production	

=== Television ===
Year	Title	Role	Notes	Ref.
2015	Dream Girl – Ek Ladki Deewani Si	Lakshmi Mathur Sareen	TV debut	
2016	Ek Duje Ke Vaaste	Suman Tiwari Malhotra		
2017–2018	Haasil	Aanchal Srivastav Raichand		
2019	Aafat	Titli Jain		
2022	Khakee: The Bihar Chapter	Tanu Lodha		
2025	The Waking of a Nation	Poonam		

=== Music video appearances ===
Year	Title	Singer(s)	Ref.
2017	"Sun Re Sajna"	Hriday Gattani	
2019	"Gungunati Rehti Hoon"	Yasser Desai, Palak Muchhal	
2022	"Mast Nazron Se"	Jubin Nautiyal	
2022	"Neendraan Ni Aandiyaan"	Aparshakti Khurana	

== Awards and nominations ==
Year	Award	Category	Work	Result	Ref.
2015	Indian Telly Awards	Fresh New Face - Female	Dream Girl	Nominated	
2016	Asian Viewers Television Awards	Female Actor Of The Year	Ek Duje Ke Vaaste	Nominated	
2020	Gold Glam and Style Awards	Stylish Actor (Female) OTT	—N/a	Won	
2023	Iconic Gold Awards	Best Actress in a Supporting Role	Khakee: The Bihar Chapter	Won	
