= Namik Paul =

Indian television actor (born 1987)

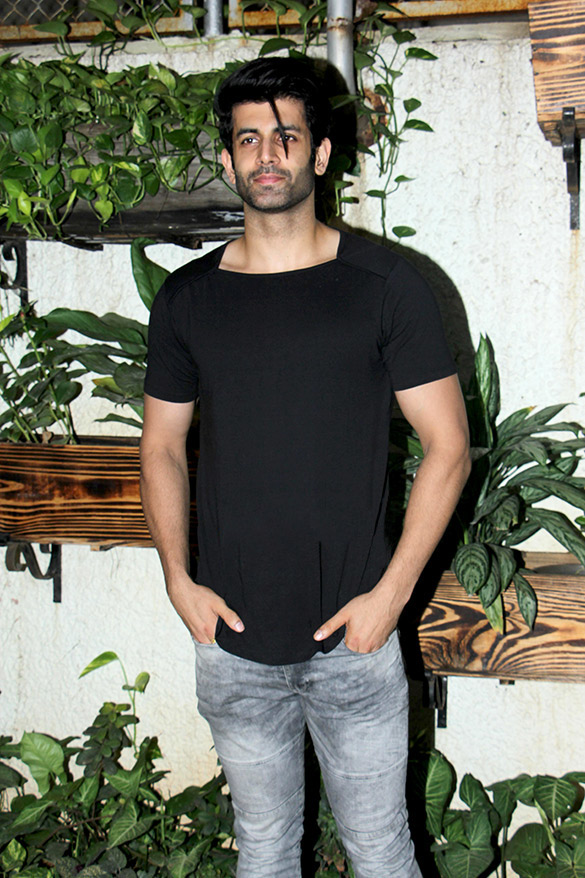
- Paul in 2019
- Born: 19 September 1987 (age 39); Dehradun, Uttrakhand, India
- Education: Lewis & Clark College, Oregon
- Occupations: Actor; journalist
- Years active: 2015–present
- Known for: Ek Duje Ke Vaaste; Ek Deewana Tha; Naagin 7 Mannat – Har Khushi Paane Ki 2

Namik Paul (born 19 September 1987) is an Indian actor who primarily works in Hindi television. He made his acting debut in 2015 with Qubool Hai portraying Ahsaan. He earned recognition with his portrayal of Shravan Malhotra in Ek Duje Ke Vaaste, his dual portrayal of Shiv Kapoor and Krish Khanna in Ek Deewaana Tha, Aryaman Suri in Naagin 7., and Kabir Oberoi in Mannat – Har Khushi Paane Ki 2.

== Early life ==
Paul was born on 19 September 1987 in Dehradun, Uttrakhand. He completed his schooling from Woodstock School, Mussoorie, Uttarakhand and graduated from Lewis & Clark College, Oregon. He started his career as a journalist with NDTV 24x7, but left the job due to erratic schedule and later took up acting.

== Career ==
Paul made his acting debut in 2015 with Qubool Hai portraying Ahsaan opposite Additi Gupta.

Paul portrayed Shravan Malhotra in Ek Duje Ke Vaaste opposite Nikita Dutta in 2016. It proved as a major turning point in his career. He received Gold Award for Debut in a Lead Role - Male nomination for his performance. He also hosted Befikre Belgium Ke with Loveleen Kaur Sasan in the same year.

From 2016 to 2017, he portrayed Adil Malik opposite Lisa Hayden in Bindass's web series The Trip, marking his web debut. In 2017, he hosted Aye Zindagi.

Paul received wider recognition with his portrayal of Shiv Kapoor in Ek Deewaana Tha opposite Donal Bisht from 2017 to 2018. In 2018, he portrayed Krish Khanna opposite Bisht post the leap in the show. He received Gold Best Onscreen Jodi nomination with Bisht.

He portrayed Angad Jindal in Kavach... Maha Shivratri opposite Deepika Singh in 2019.

In 2020, he portrayed Viraj Bharadwaj in Kasautii Zindagii Kay opposite Erica Fernandes.

From February 2023 to May 2023, he played the dual roles of Shiv Dhoopar and Aniket Dhoopar opposite Tanisha Mehta, Post a hiatus of 3 years, Paul made his comeback with Lag Ja Gale. From May 2025 to September 2025, he played Shivansh Randhawa in Zee TV's Kumkum Bhagya opposite Pranali Rathod after a two-year television hiatus.

From December 2025 to June 2026, he played Aryaman Suri in Colors TV's Naagin 7 opposite Priyanka Chahar Choudhary. Since October 2026, he playing Kabir Oberoi in Colors TV's Mannat Har Khushi Paane Ki 2.

== Media image ==
In 2026, he was listed in 40 Under 40 by the Indian edition of Variety.

== Filmography ==
=== Television ===
Year	Title	Role	Notes	Ref.
2015	Qubool Hai	Ahsaan		
2016	Ek Duje Ke Vaaste	Shravan Malhotra		
2016	Befikre Belgium Ke	Host		
2017	Aye Zindagi	Host		
2017–2018	Ek Deewaana Tha	Shiv Kapoor		
2018	Ek Deewaana Tha	Krish Khanna		
2019	Kavach... Maha Shivratri	Angad Jindal		
2020	Kasautii Zindagii Kay	Viraj Bharadwaj		
2023	Lag Ja Gale	Shiv Dhoopar		
2023	Lag Ja Gale	Aniket Dhoopar		
2025	Kumkum Bhagya	Shivansh Randhawa		
2025–2026	Naagin 7	Aryaman Suri		
2026–present	Mannat – Har Khushi Paane Ki 2	Kabir Oberoi		

=== Web series ===
Year	Title	Role	Notes	Ref.
2016–2017	The Trip	Adil Malik	Season 1	
2025	But If Mohabbat	Aryan Vashishth		

== Awards and nominations ==
Year	Award	Category	Work	Result	Ref.
2016	Asian Viewers Television Awards	Male Actor Of The Year	Ek Duje Ke Vaaste	Nominated	
2016	Gold Awards	Debut in a Lead Role (Male)	Ek Duje Ke Vaaste	Nominated	
2017	Lions Gold Awards	Best Onscreen Couple (Jury) (With Nikita Dutta)	Ek Duje Ke Vaaste	Won	
2018	Gold Awards	Best Onscreen Jodi (With Donal Bisht)	Ek Deewaana Tha	Nominated	

== See also ==
- List of Indian television actors
