= Dange (film) =

Dange / Por
- Theatrical release poster of Hindi version
- Directed by: Bejoy Nambiar
- Written by: Screenplay: Bejoy Nambiar; Mithila Hegde; Francis Thomas; Neil Julian Balthazar; Tamil Dialogues: Vignesh Shrikanth; Hindi Dialogues: Punit Sheth; Bejoy Nambiar
- Story by: Bejoy Nambiar
- Produced by: Bhushan Kumar; Krishan Kumar; Bejoy Nambiar; Prabhu Antony; Madhu Alexander
- Starring: Arjun Das; Kalidas Jayaram; Harshvardhan Rane; Ehan Bhat; Zoa Morani; Nikita Dutta; Sanchana Natarajan; TJ Bhanu
- Cinematography: Jimshi Khalid; Presley Oscar D'Souza
- Edited by: Priyank Prem Kumar
- Music by: Score: Modern Tape Scores (Sachidanand Sankaranarayanan & Harish Venkat); Gaurav Godkhindi; Songs: Sanjith Hegde; Dhruv Visvanath
- Production company: T-Series Films
- Distributed by: AA Films
- Release date: 1 March 2024
- Running time: Hindi version: 150 minutes Tamil version: 151 minutes
- Country: India
- Languages: Hindi; Tamil

Dange (transl. Rioting) / Por (transl. War) is a 2024 Indian action drama film written and directed by Bejoy Nambiar. The film was shot simultaneously in Hindi and Tamil and stars Harshvardhan Rane and Ehan Bhat in the Hindi version while Arjun Das and Kalidas Jayaram starred in the Tamil version. Nikita Dutta in the Hindi version, Sanchana Natarajan in the Tamil version and TJ Bhanu appear in supporting roles.

The film follows Yuvaraj "Yuva" as he joins St. Martin's university for studies and learns that his childhood friend-turned-foe Xavier "Zee"/Prabhu Selvan is the senior student in the college. Yuva, who shares bitter memories with Zee/Prabhu, locks horns with Zee/Prabhu and sets out exact vengeance.

Dange and Por were released on 1 March 2024 to mixed reviews from critics, and is available for streaming on Netflix.

== Plot ==
Xavier "Zee" Coutinho/Prabhu selvan was a popular student in his final year of medicine. Xavier/prabhu was known for indulging in hardcore narcotics and recreational drugs, which from time to time hampered his progress to graduating from the university. Sadly, Xavier/Prabhu turned up high for his presentation he was compulsory required to submit.

Yuvaraj, aka Yuva, was a first-year student who joined the university and was subjected to ragging by several seniors. Yuva tried to stand up for himself and not entertain the demands put forward by them, and he soon began to gather support from several juniors of his year. He stood up against all the seniors who tried to corner him at several places around the campus. The seniors were taken aback by the spirit built up by Yuva in a short time on campus and chose to stay away from him.

Gayathri was a student political leader, and along with her friend Ambika/Vennila Ponnuswamy, she formed Awaaz, a political party that spoke up for the people from other castes who were being discriminated against on college campuses and hostels. Siddhi/Surya, on the other hand, was also a student leader at the college. She was also the daughter of a local Goan leader who was grooming her to be the chief minister of the state. Joining college-level politics was her entryway into mainstream ones, and she had the support from inside and outside of the college. Siddhi/Surya and Ambika/Vennila were in love at some point during their time in college, but since they were broken up, neither of them minded fighting against each other for the upcoming election for the post of general secretary.

Xavier/Prabhu was Yuvaraj’s senior during their school time at a boarding school. A young Yuvaraj was attached to Xavier/prabhu for everything, and the latter always took care of the young boy since he was away from his parents living in the same school hostel. Xavier/Prabhu was sadly unaware of how brutal his seniors would be on Yuvaraj. The young boy was molested in the dorm by them, and Xavier/Prabhu could not stop anyone. Yuvaraj refused to forget his brother-like figure in school, who never stood up for him. Xavier/Prabhu never got over the guilt, as the boy had left the school before he could apologize. Years later, Xavier/Prabhu was again his senior, but Yuvraj was not planning to be timid. Xavier was apologetic for his mistake, but Yuvaraj wouldn’t have it and wanted revenge for a scarred childhood.

== Cast ==
Cast (Hindi)	Cast (Tamil)	Role (Hindi)	Role (Tamil)
Harshvardhan Rane	Arjun Das	Xavier "Zee"	Prabu Selvan
Ehan Bhat	Kalidas Jayaram	Yuvaraj "Yuva"	Yuvaraj "Yuva"
Nikita Dutta	Sanchana Natarajan	Rishika "Rish"	Rishika "Rish"
TJ Bhanu Parvathimurthy		Gayatri "Gayu"	Gayatri "Gayu"
Zoa Morani	Amrutha Srinivasan	Siddhi	Surya Sabapathy
Taniya Kalrra	Nithya Shri	Ambika	Vennila Ponnusamy
Nakul Roshan Sahdev		Bosco	Bosco
Shreema Upadhyaya		Bhama	Bhama
John Vijay		SHO	SHO
Mridul Das	Dev Ramnath	Arjun	Arjun
Bala Suresh Babu	Keshav Lokwani	Bala	Bala
Siddharth Menon		Kabir	Akilan
Vivek Rajgopal		Vikas	Vikas
Jeeva Subramanian		Gayatri's friend	Gayatri's friend
Danish Sait		Church father (cameo) (Note: A critic credited his character's name as "Father Francis", though that name is never mentioned in the narrative.)	Church father (cameo)

=== Hindi version ===
- Vinit Mainkar as Hostel owner

=== Tamil version ===
- Vinod Sagar as Dean
- Mervyn Rozario as Thiruchendur Diwakar
- Thomas Mathew as Bald Senior
- Hanumankind as Student
- Vikkals Sibi as Student
- Monish Elamaran as Young Prabu

== Soundtrack ==
The background score was composed by Modern Tape Scores (Sachidanand Sankaranarayanan and Harish Venkat) and Gaurav Godkhindi, while the songs were composed by Sanjith Hegde and Dhruv Visvanath.

Hindi tracklist
No.	Title	Lyrics	Music	Singer(s)	Length
1.	"Le Le Pangey"	Kausar Munir	Sanjith Hegde	Sanjith Hegde, Anurag Kulkarni, Varsha S Krishnan	2:25
2.	"Yeh Pal Hain Apne"	Vishwadeep Zeest	Dhruv Visvanath	Dhruv Visvanath	2:53
3.	"Dange Theme"	—	Gaurav Godkhindi	—	2:37
4.	"Aa Bhid Jaa Re"	Siddhant Kaushal	Sanjith Hegde	Sanjith Hegde	2:28
Total length:					10:23

Tamil tracklist
No.	Title	Lyrics	Music	Singer(s)	Length
1.	"Asaraadhe"	Kritika Nelson	Sanjith Hegde	Sanjith Hegde, Varsha S Krishnan	2:26
2.	"Nanpagal Neram"	Vignesh Srikanth	Dhruv Visvanath	Kapil Kapilan	2:54
3.	"Por Theme"	—	Gaurav Godkhindi	—	2:37
4.	"Ping Pong"	Mohan Rajan	Sanjith Hegde	Sanjith Hegde, V. M. Mahalingam	2:28
5.	"Nam Kural"	Mohan Rajan	Elroy Vincent	Chinmayi
Total length:					10:25

== Release ==
The film was released on 1 March 2024 in Hindi and Tamil languages.

== Reception ==
Dange and Por received mixed reviews from critics with praise for its acting, cinematography, technical aspects, action sequences and music, but criticized the excess characters and sub-plots.

=== Dange ===
Titas Chowdhury of News18 gave 3.5/5 stars and wrote "Much like Bejoy Nambiar’s previous works, Dange is marked with a distinct style, voice, colour and texture. Its biggest strength lies in its fresh appeal and treatment." Dhaval Roy of The Times of India gave 3/5 stars and wrote "Despite decent performances and atmosphere, Dange's plot meanders, often losing focus on the point of it all, which makes the direction seem overindulgent." Rohit Bhatnagar of The Free Press Journal gave 3/5 stars and wrote "Dange is enjoyable, but highly recommended for a one-time watch." Devesh Sharma of Filmfare gave 3/5 stars and wrote "There’s a raw energy to Dange. It’s another film celebrating hyper-masculinity, which seems to be the flavour of the season. Watch it for a glimpse of what happens beneath the facade of respectability associated with institutes catering to higher education." Rahul Desai of Film Companion wrote "The craft is so proudly visible in director Bejoy Nambiar’s film that it overwhelms everything else."

=== Por ===
Roopa Radhakrishnan of The Times of India gave 3/5 stars and wrote "There are a lot of characters and subplots in Por, and it's quite natural that the film isn't able to justify all of them." Narayani. M of The New Indian Express gave 2.5/5 stars and wrote "It’s a cinematic rollercoaster ride, and you would want to stand up and clap for its technical brilliance. Yet amidst the exhilarating ride, there’s a lingering sense of disappointment as the narrative fails to rise to the occasion." Gopinath Rajendran of The Hindu wrote "‘Por’ features some fascinating ideas, decent performances and looks stylish, but the sub-plots don’t come together cohesively resulting in a predictable drama that’s all over the place." Latha Srinivasan of Hindustan Times wrote "Por is a film that goes down fighting to win over the audience with its youth story. Unfortunately, the story doesn’t have the spunk of Arjun Das nor the fury of Kalidas Jayaram to keep us engaged and invested."
