= Geetanjali Singh =

Indian film and television actress

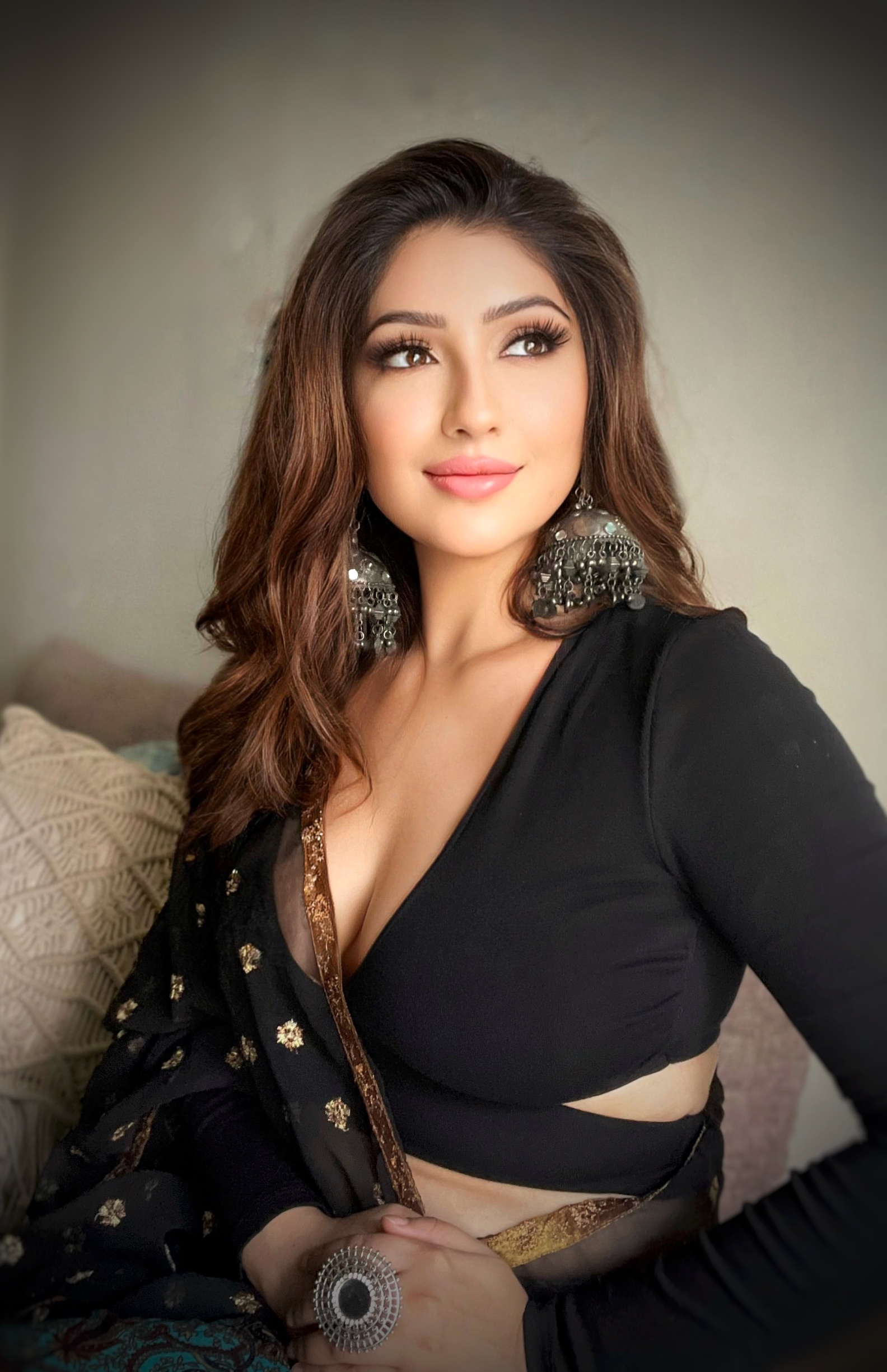
- Geetanjali Singh, Indian actress
- Born: 8 February; Gorakhpur, Uttar Pradesh, India
- Occupation(s): Actress, model
- Years active: 2013–present
- Known for: Tumhari Pakhi, Dil Toh Happy Hai Ji, Falsafa: The Other Side

Geetanjali Singh is an Indian film and television actress, best known for her television shows, Tumhari Paakhi, Million Dollar Girl, and Dil Toh Happy Hai Ji. She has also been featured in major ad campaigns with the brands such as Amazon, Nestle, Nikon, AJIO, Flipkart, and Cox & Kings. Her feature film Falsafa: The Other Side was released in 2019.

== Early life and career ==
Singh is from Gorakhpur in Uttar Pradesh. She was the first from her state to work as an air hostess, and transitioned into the Indian film and television industry in 2013. Singh's breakthrough role was in the drama, Tumhari Paakhi (2013–2014), playing the part of Deepika in all 269 episodes of the show. In 2019, she starred in the Bollywood film, Falsafa: The Other Side, opposite Manit Joura and Sumit Gulati. She has also appeared in the TV series, Million Dollar Girl (2014–2015) and Dil Toh Happy Hai Ji (2019), as well as television commercials.

== Television ==
Year	Title	Role	Notes
2013–2014	Tumhari Paakhi	Deepika	TV series, 269 episodes
2014/2015	Million Dollar Girl	Kavya	TV series
2019	Falsafa: The Other Side	Isha	Film
2019	Dil Toh Happy Hai Ji	Dinky Mehra	TV series, 2 episodes
