= Shraddha Arya =

Indian actress (born 1987)

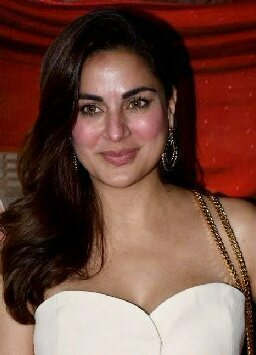
- Arya in 2023
- Born: 17 August 1987 (age 39); New Delhi, India
- Education: University of Mumbai
- Occupations: Actress; model
- Years active: 2004–present
- Spouse: Rahul Nagal (m. 2021)
- Children: 2

Shraddha Arya (pronounced [ˈʃɾəd̪d̪ʱa ˈaːɾjaː]; born 17 August 1987) is an Indian actress. She made her film debut as a lead role in SJ Suryah's Tamil film Kalvanin Kadhali along with Nayantara in 2006, in Hindi film Nishabd and in Telugu film Godava with Vaibhav Reddy. She is known for her performances in the Life OK serials Main Lakshmi Tere Aangan Ki, Tumhari Paakhi and Dream Girl.

Arya received widespread acclaim popularity for her portrayal of role of Dr. Preeta Arora in Zee TV's Kundali Bhagya. In 2019, she simultaneously participated in Nach Baliye 9 as a contestant along with Alam Makkar.

== Early life ==
Arya was born in New Delhi, India. She holds a master's degree in economics from University of Mumbai.

== Personal life ==
In 2015, Arya got engaged to an NRI named Jayant Ratti but the duo called off their engagement due to compatibility issues. She revealed her relationship with Alam Singh Makkar when the couple decided to participate in dance reality show Nach Baliye in 2019. The couple broke up soon after the show finished.

On 16 November 2021, Arya married Indian Navy Officer, Rahul Nagal in an intimate ceremony in her hometown New Delhi.

In September 2024, the couple announced that they're expecting their first child. On 29 November 2024, the couple had twins, a boy, Shaurya and a girl, Siya.

== Career ==
Arya started her career with Zee TV's talent hunt show India's Best Cinestars Ki Khoj; she became the first runner-up. She made her acting debut in 2006 with the Tamil movie Kalvanin Kadhali opposite actor-director S. J. Surya. After that, she ventured into Bollywood with Ram Gopal Varma's Nishabd. She also appeared in the Shahid Kapoor-starrer Paathshaala. She simultaneously ventured into the Telugu industry and did substantial roles in films like Godava, opposite Vaibhav Reddy, Kothi Muka and Romeo. She also performed in Tamil cinema in Kalvanin Kadhali. She has also done two Kannada movies and a Malayalam movie. In 2011, Arya made her television debut with the Indian soap opera Main Lakshmi Tere Aangan Ki. Her breakthrough performance came in the role of Paakhi in Life OK's Tumhari Pakhi. She further rose to prominence with the role of Ayesha in Dream Girl - Ek Ladki Deewani Si.

She won many awards for her performances in Dream Girl and Tumhari Paakhi, including Indian Telly Award for Best Actress in a Negative Role for Dream Girl, Best Jodi Award at the Zee Gold Awards, Hero of the Month Award by Life OK, and the Women Achievers Award in 2016.

In 2016, Arya hosted a comedy show called Mazaak Mazaak Mein, produced by Ekta Kapoor and Shobha Kapoor.

From July 2017, she appeared in Zee TV's Kundali Bhagya as Dr. Preeta Arora Luthra initially opposite Dheeraj Dhoopar, followed up by opposite Shakti Arora and Shakti Anand until it went off-air in December 2024. Her performance won her many awards and nominations including Best Actress at Gold Awards, Indian Telly Awards and Indian Television Academy Awards.

== Media image ==
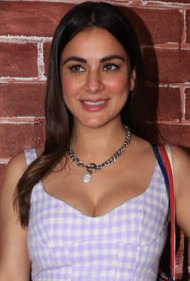
Arya at an event in 2022

Post Kundali Bhagya, Arya has established her among the leading and highest-paid actresses of the Hindi television. Arya has been placed in The Times of India's Most Desirable Women on Television list, since 2017. She ranked 16th in 2017, 15th in 2018, 18th in 2019 and 14th in 2020.

== Filmography ==
=== Films ===
Year	Title	Role	Language	Notes	Ref.
2006	Kalvanin Kadhali	Tina	Tamil		
2007	Nishabd	Ritu Anand	Hindi		
2007	Godava	Anjali	Telugu		
2009	Romeo	Unknown	Telugu		
2010	Paathshaala	Natasha Singh	Hindi		
2010	Kothi Muka	Lavanya	Telugu		
2011	Double Decker	Parvathy	Kannada		
2011	Maduve Mane	Suma	Kannada		
2018	Banjara	Unknown	Punjabi		
2023	Rocky Aur Rani Kii Prem Kahaani	Rupa	Hindi	Cameo	

=== Television ===
Year	Title	Role	Notes	Ref.
2004	India's Best Cinestars Ki Khoj	Contestant	Season 1	
2008	Ssshhhh...Phir Koi Hai	Sanjana		
2011–2012	Main Lakshmi Tere Aangan Ki	Lakshmi Agnihotri/Kanchi Kashyap		
2013–2014	Tumhari Paakhi	Paakhi Shekhawat		
2015–2016	Dream Girl	Ayesha Roy/Aarti Roy		
2016	Box Cricket League 2	Contestant		
2016	Mazaak Mazaak Mein	Host		
2017	Kasam Tere Pyaar Ki	Swati Purab Singh Bedi		
2017–2024	Kundali Bhagya	Dr. Preeta Arora Luthra		
2017	Entertainment Ki Raat	Herself	Guest appearance	
2019	Nach Baliye 9	Contestant	6th place	
2019	Khatra Khatra Khatra	Herself	Guest appearance	
2021	Indian Pro Music League	Herself	Special appearance	
2017-2018;2024;2025	Kumkum Bhagya	Dr. Preeta Arora Luthra	Extended Guest Appearance	
2026–present	Dil Ki Bewafaiyaan	Janaki		

=== Music video appearances ===
Year	Title	Singer(s)	Ref.
2006	"Jeena"	Debojit Saha	
2006	"Soniye Hiriye"	Shael Oswal	
2017	"Meri Jaan"	Shael Oswal	
2019	"PK"	Gurnam Bhullar	
2019	"Car Gabru Di"	Karan Singh Arora	
2020	"Viah Nai Karauna"	Asees Kaur	
2021	"Guilty"	Karan Aujla	
2021	"Na Maar"	Afsana Khan	
2021	"Nikaah"	Arjun, Ali Brothers	
2022	"Zeher"	Vicky Thakur	

== Awards and nominations ==
Year	Award	Category	Show	Result	Ref.
2014	Gold Awards	Best Actor Female (Popular)	Tumhari Paakhi	Nominated	
2014	Gold Awards	Best Onscreen Jodi (With Mohammed Iqbal Khan)	Tumhari Paakhi	Won	
2015	Indian Telly Awards	Best Actress in a Negative Role	Dream Girl	Won	
2018	Gold Awards	Best Actor Female (Popular)	Kundali Bhagya	Won	
2018	Gold Awards	Best Onscreen Jodi Popular (With Dheeraj Dhoopar )	Kundali Bhagya	Nominated	
2019	Indian Telly Awards	Best Actor In Lead Role Female (Popular)	Kundali Bhagya	Nominated	
2019	Indian Telly Awards	Best Jodi Popular (With Dheeraj Dhoopar)	Kundali Bhagya	Nominated	
2019	Gold Awards	Best Actor Female (Popular)	Kundali Bhagya	Won	
2019	Gold Awards	Best Onscreen Jodi Popular (With Dheeraj Dhoopar)	Kundali Bhagya	Nominated	
2019	Indian Television Academy Awards	Best Actress (Popular)	Kundali Bhagya	Nominated	
2020	Gold Glam and Style Awards	Professional Glamorous Star (Female) TV	—N/a	Won	
2022	21st Indian Television Academy Awards	Best Actress (Popular)	Kundali Bhagya	Nominated	
2022	22nd Indian Television Academy Awards	Best Actress (Popular)	Kundali Bhagya	Nominated	
2022	Iconic Gold Awards	Iconic Most Stylish TV Actress of The Year	—N/a	Won	

== See also ==
- List of Hindi television actresses
- List of Indian actresses
