= Jiah Khan =

American actress and singer (1988-2013)

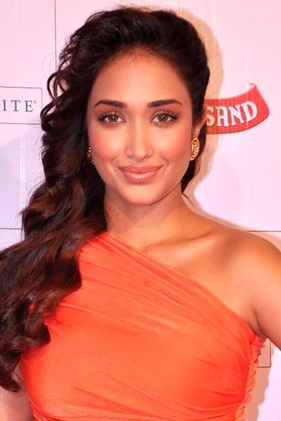
- Khan at the Stardust Awards in January 2013
- Born: Nafisa Rizvi Khan; 20 February 1988; New York City, U.S.
- Died: 3 June 2013 (aged 25); Mumbai, Maharashtra, India
- Citizenship: United Kingdom; United States
- Occupations: Actress; singer
- Years active: 2007–2013
- Partner: Sooraj Pancholi (2012–2013)

Nafisa Rizvi Khan (20 February 1988 – 3 June 2013), better known as Jiah Khan, was an American actress and singer who worked in Indian films. She appeared in three Hindi films from 2007 to 2010.

Born in New York City to Indian parents, she was raised and educated in London. Khan aspired to pursue a career in acting and moved to Mumbai for a film career. She made her film debut in the 2007 Ram Gopal Verma film Nishabd for which she was nominated for Filmfare Award for Best Female Debut. She was later noted for portraying the supporting role of a modern, independent woman in Ghajini, which was the highest-grossing Bollywood film of 2008. After a two-year absence, she was reportedly praised for her comic role in the romantic comedy Housefull, which was the fifth highest-grossing Bollywood film of 2010.

On 3 June 2013, her body was found hanging from a ceiling fan in the bedroom of her family residence in Juhu, Mumbai. The Central Bureau of Investigation (CBI) conducted an investigation and heard her story at the Bombay High Court which concluded her death as suicide. However, Khan's mother continued to claim that Khan had been murdered by her partner, actor Sooraj Pancholi, leading the same prosecution to make a failed attempt to lay charges of murder and sexual assault against him in 2017. In 2018, a court in Mumbai charged Pancholi with abetting.

== Early life ==
Nafisa Khan was born on 20 February 1988 in New York City, United States, to Ali Rizvi Khan, an American businessman, and Rabiya Amin, a Hindi film actress in the 1980s from Agra, Uttar Pradesh. Her father left the family when she was 3 months old, and she had two younger half-sisters.

Khan grew up in London where she completed her GCSEs and A levels, before moving to Mumbai to pursue a career in Bollywood. She was inspired to enter Bollywood after watching Ram Gopal Verma's former protege Urmila Matondkar's movie Rangeela at the age of six.

Khan studied at the Lee Strasberg Theatre and Film Institute in Manhattan, and she quit upon receiving a movie offer. She learned various dance forms, including belly dancing, kathak, lambada, jazz, samba and reggae.

== Career ==
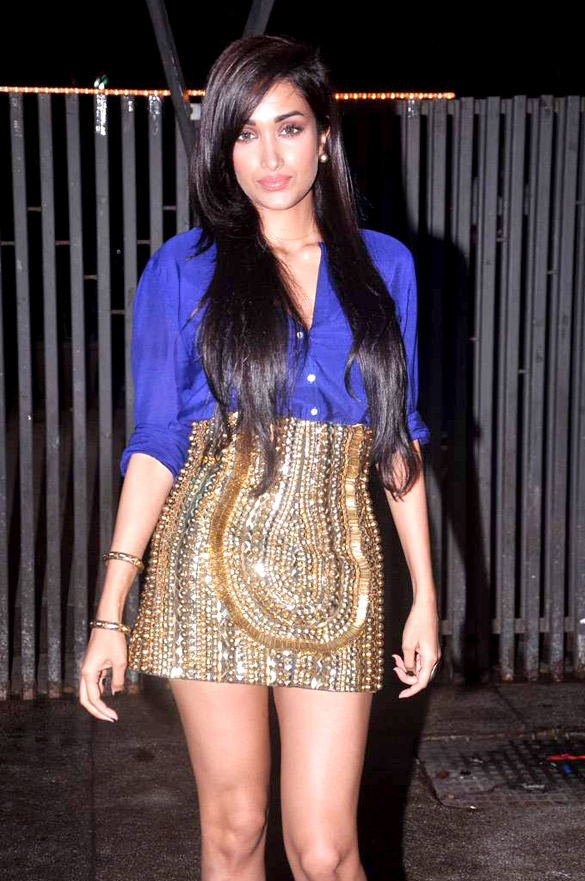
Khan at the launch of Nokia APP in 2010.

In 2004, at the age of 16, Khan was signed to act in Mukesh Bhatt's Tumsa Nahin Dekha but backed out when both she and the director felt the role was too mature for her; she was replaced by Dia Mirza. Three years later, in 2007, at the age of 18, Khan made her debut in Ram Gopal Verma's controversial romantic thriller Nishabd as Jia where she acted opposite Amitabh Bachchan. Despite the provocative content in the film, it performed poorly at the box office and earned mixed reviews from critics. Nonetheless, Khan received a mostly positive reception for her performance, with critics noting her confidence, attitude, and sex appeal. Raja Sen praised her portrayal of Jia, a seductive, free-spirited teenager, calling her performance "nuanced" and "impressive". Taran Adarsh agrees, saying that "Newcomer Jiah Khan is supremely confident. Loaded with attitude and sex appeal, the newcomer carries off her part with flourish. Her scenes with Bachchan are superb!" Rajeev Masand adds that she is "perfectly cast" for the film. She was also nominated for a Filmfare Best Female Debut Award, however lost to Deepika Padukone for Om Shanti Om.

The following year, she appeared alongside Aamir Khan and Asin in A.R. Murugadoss's psychological thriller Ghajini, the Hindi remake of its namesake. She played Sunita, a medical student who investigates the history of Sanjay Singhania, portrayed by Aamir Khan. The film gathered much appreciation from critics and went on to become the highest-grossing Bollywood film of 2008. Khan's performance attracted mixed reviews, with critics agreeing that her role was "sketchy". Despite this, Sukanya Verma compliments her performance, commenting that Khan "continues to strike as an exquisite and expressive actress."

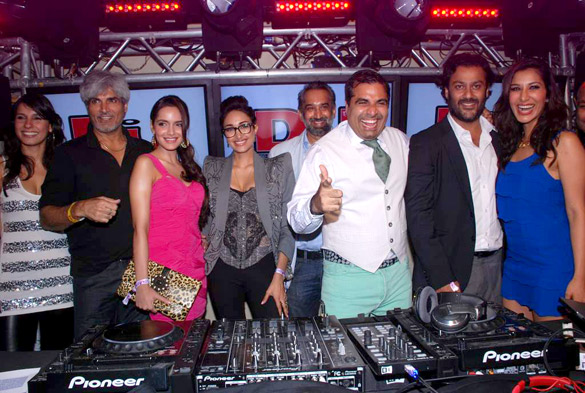
Khan with Shazahn Padamsee, Shailendra Singh, Abhishek Kapoor and Sophie Choudry at DJ Magazine launch in 2012.

In 2010, Khan had almost completed the shooting of the dance film Chance Pe Dance opposite Shahid Kapoor when the director Ken Ghosh asked her to leave the film, and she was replaced by Genelia D'Souza. The director said that she got over-friendly with Kapoor and was not doing her job well. However, after the release of the film, Khan said that she was asked to leave because the director had a bad eye on her. Kapoor said that he had no hand in the replacement of Khan, and got to know about the replacement when D'Souza came on the set for shooting. However, the film was a box office flop and Khan said that she was happy for leaving the film. That same year, she made her last film appearance in a supporting role as Devika K. Samtani, the ex-wife of Akshay Kumar's character, in Sajid Khan's Housefull with an ensemble cast including Arjun Rampal, Riteish Deshmukh, Deepika Padukone and Lara Dutta. Upon release, Housefull received negative reviews, though her performance was better received. Commercially the film did very well and became the highest grossing Bollywood film of the year. Her paternal aunts are Pakistani actresses Hina Rizvi, Sangeeta (Parveen Rizvi) and Kaveeta (Nasreen Rizvi). Khan had signed a few movies including Udhas Singh's Aap Ka Saaya, in which she was supposed to play Ranbir Kapoor's wife. Unfortunately, this film could not be completed.

== Death ==
Khan reportedly died after hanging herself sometime between 11:00 pm and 11:30 pm on 3 June 2013 at her residence in Juhu, Mumbai. Her mother and sister were not at home at the time.

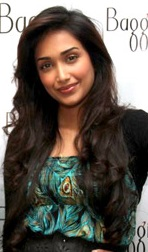
Khan in London in 2009.

An autopsy was performed at JJ Hospital in Byculla. Her body was then brought back to her residence around 7:00 am on Wednesday following the post-mortem. On the same day her Namaz-e-janaza (funeral prayer) took place at Sonapur Kabar Walla Masjid and she was buried at Juhu Muslim cemetery after Dhuhr prayer as per Islamic rites. Bollywood actors in attendance included Aamir Khan, Kiran Rao, Riteish Deshmukh, Siddharth Mallya, Sophie Choudry, Urvashi Dholakia, Prem Chopra, Ranjeet, Deepak Parashar, Sanjay Khan and Nagma. Bollywood stars reacted with shock at her death.

On 7 June 2013, a six-page hand-written note was found at her residence by her sister, allegedly addressed to Khan's boyfriend Sooraj Pancholi. The note reportedly indicated that Khan had planned to end her life. A transcript mentioning a recent abortion was released by the family. However, her mother later said the purported events did not add up and that she suspected foul play. On 8 June 2013, Khan's memorial was held at Vile Parle Medical Club to pray for Khan and her family. Bollywood actors in attendance included Aamir Khan, Deepika Padukone, Randhir Kapoor, Prateik Babbar, Sanjay Kapoor, Shweta Pandit, Kiran Rao, Urvashi Dholakia, Ranjeet, Deepak Parashar, Sanjay Khan and Nagma.

Pancholi, who lived with Khan, was taken into police custody during the investigation of her suicide on 10 June 2013. In her suicide note, Jiah mentioned that Sooraj used to physically abuse and torture her every time. The Bombay High Court granted him bail on 2 July 2013. On 3 July 2014, a year after her death, the Central Bureau of Investigation (CBI) was ordered by the High Court to further investigate the death.

The High Court held a hearing on the matter, starting on 7 June 2016, following the Supreme Court's call to expedite the process. On 1 August 2016 the CBI ruled out murder in the case. As per its investigations, the cause of Khan's death was 'suicide by hanging'. Khan's mother, Rabia, independently hired British forensics expert Jason Payne-James, who concluded in a 20 September 2016 report that "Khan's hanging was staged and the marks on her face and neck indicate it was not simply suicide."

In January 2017 the prosecution requested that charges of sexual assault and murder be laid against Pancholi.

On 31 January 2018 a court in Mumbai charged Pancholi with abetting Khan's suicide. The CBI submitted a list of 69 witnesses, including Khan's mother Rabia, the complainant, with the case to begin in March 2018. In April 2023, the CBI Special Court acquitted Pancholi due to lack of evidence.

In 2024, Sooraj's mother Zarina claimed that Khan had attempted suicide 4 times before she met her son.

== In media ==
An episode of the TV series Yeh Hai Aashiqui was loosely based on Jiah Khan's suicide, with Mihika Verma and Rithvik Dhanjani playing the central characters. On 11 January 2021, the BBC started airing a three-part documentary about Khan's death, Death in Bollywood.

== Filmography ==
Year	Film	Role	Notes
2007	Nishabd	Jiah	Nominated—Filmfare Award for Best Female Debut; Also playback singer for song "Take Lite"
2008	Ghajini	Sunita Kalantri	
2010	Housefull	Devika K. Samtani	Final appearance
