= Dybbuk box =

Wine box claimed to be haunted

The Dybbuk box, or Dibbuk box (Hebrew: קופסת דיבוק, romanized: Kufsat Dibbuk), is an antique wine-cabinet claimed to be haunted by a dybbuk, a concept from Jewish mythology. The box drew attention when it was auctioned on eBay by owner Kevin Mannis, who created a story featuring Jewish Holocaust survivors and paranormal claims as part of his eBay item description. Mannis' story was the inspiration for the 2012 horror film The Possession.

In 2021, Mannis told Input magazine that the Dybbuk Box story was entirely fictional.

== History ==
In 2003, writer and furniture refinishing business owner Kevin Mannis purchased the cabinet from the yard sale of a local attorney in Portland, Oregon, and began developing a backstory. According to Mannis, "The carving in the back of it is my carving. The stone that was in the box is something that is a signature creation of mine also. Make no mistake, I conceived of the Dybbuk Box – the name, the term, the idea – and wrote this creative story around it to post on eBay." Mannis' auction description included a story claiming the cabinet was previously owned by a survivor of the Holocaust in Poland who said it contained the malicious spirit of a dybbuk, and that the box had paranormal powers and was responsible for his bad luck and nightmares. Subsequent owners retold Mannis' story when reselling the item and amplified it with their own claims of "strange phenomena".

One owner, Jason Haxton, Director of the Museum of Osteopathic Medicine in Kirksville, Missouri, launched a website that consolidated claims about the cabinet called dibbukbox.com that reportedly received hundreds of thousands of hits and created what has been described as an "internet legend". In 2004, Haxton sold the rights to the story to a Hollywood production company. The subsequent film The Possession, produced by Sam Raimi, was released in 2012. Haxton later gave the cabinet to Ghost Adventures star Zak Bagans to display in his museum. In 2018, fans of rapper Post Malone claimed his spate of bad luck was caused by his contact with the cabinet.

== Response ==
According to author Allan S. Mott, "we embrace such stories because they tap into our own fears and prejudices". Mott said the story "taps into our belief that out in the world there is a supernatural evil that will attack anyone regardless of how good they are. They allow people to make some sense of a chaotic world." Folklorist Jan Harold Brunvand noted that the story features "a supernatural angle" and "first-person narrative"; a variation on typical urban legends. California State University anthropology professor and folklore specialist Elliott Oring criticized claims about the cabinet, saying, "Go through [the story and] you will see areas that seem to require suspending critical functions". Arizona minister and author Rev. Jim Willis opined that the story was most likely "a very elaborate hoax," but that his opinion "takes all the fun away" from the popular urban legend.

Chris French, head of the Anomalistic Psychology Research Unit at Goldsmiths' College, said the box's owners were "already primed to be looking out for bad stuff. If you believe you have been cursed, then inevitably you explain the bad stuff that happens in terms of what you perceive to be the cause. Put it like this: I would be happy to own this object."

In 2014, skeptical author Brian Dunning investigated the dybbuk box legend and determined that

The whole idea of the box being inhabited by a dybbuk (דיבבוק) [sic] is nonsensical, according to what a dybbuk is supposed to be. The Encyclopedia Mythica describes it as "a disembodied spirit possessing a living body that belongs to another soul" and usually talks from that person's mouth. An important 1914 Yiddish play The Dybbuk was about the spirit of a dead man who possessed the living body of the woman he had loved, and had to be exorcised ... Nowhere in the folkloric literature is there precedent for a dybbuk inhabiting a box or other inanimate object.

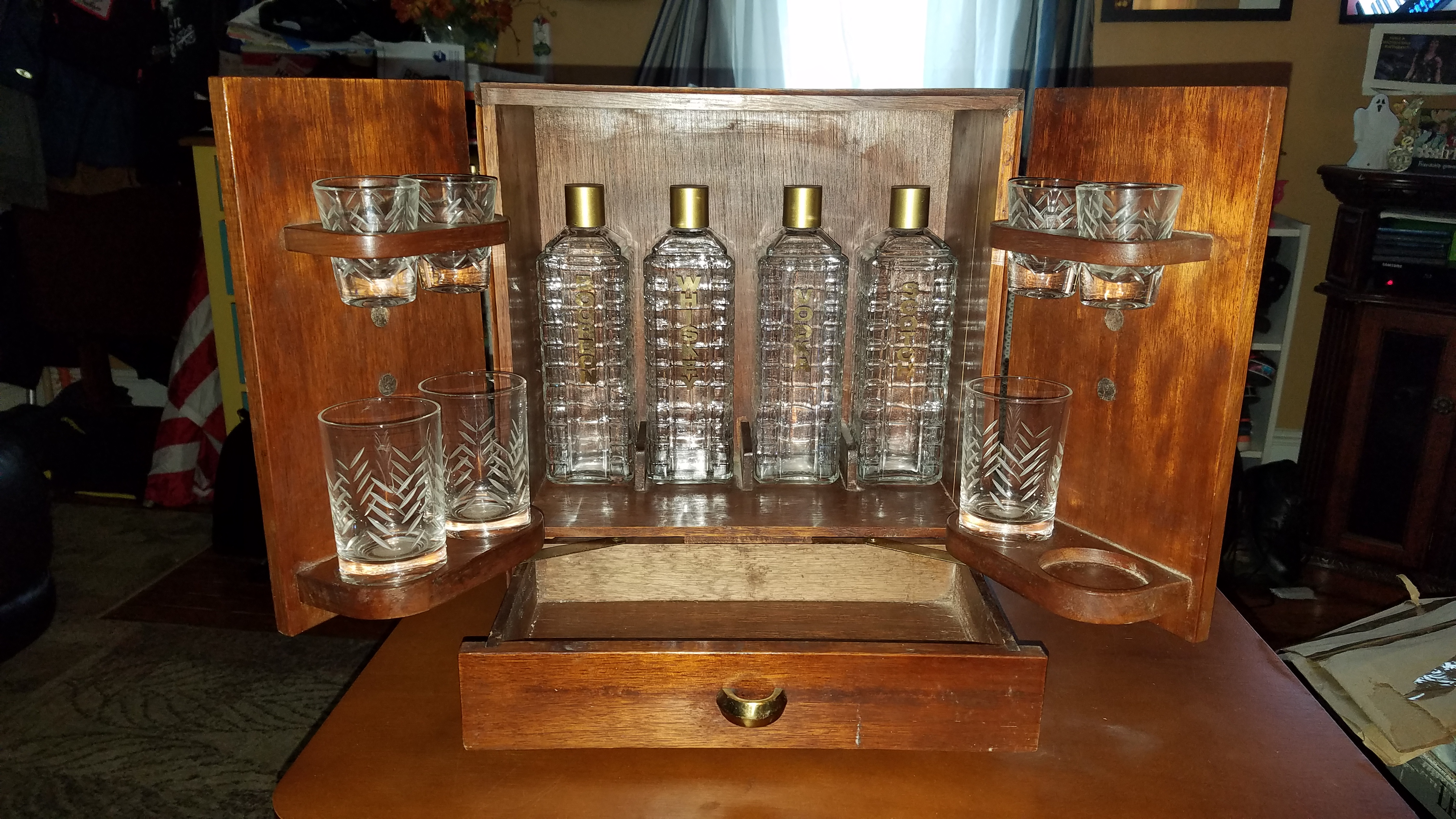
A vintage New York minibar that Biddle found online, identical to the "Dybbuk box"

In January 2019, investigator Kenny Biddle, in his "Closer Look" column in Skeptical Inquirer online, reviewed the Dibbuk Box he found on display in Zak Bagans's haunted museum in Las Vegas. His conclusion, following careful investigation of the cabinet's construction and history, was "Despite what various owners would have us think, the infamous Dibbuk Box is not a Jewish wine cabinet from Spain but instead a minibar from New York." Biddle also wrote that he believed Mannis created the dybbuk box story "from whole cloth", and that "This elaborate story that started the entire legend was not an account of real supernatural events, but instead a fictional backstory he came up with to sell an ordinary and incomplete minibar." Biddle's claim of the box and its legend being fraudulent is backed up by a screen capture of a post made by the originator of the legend, Kevin Mannis, to the Haunt ME Facebook page. The post, dated October 24, 2015, states:

I am the original creator of the story of The Dibbuk Box which appeared as one of my Ebay [sic] posts back in 2003. ... How about this – if you or anyone else can find any reference to a Dibbut [sic] Box anywhere in history prior to my Ebay post, I'll pay you $100,000.00 and tattoo your name on my forehead.

In 2021, Mannis admitted to writer Charles Moss that the box was his own creation: "I am a creative writer. The Dybbuk Box is a story that I created. And the Dybbuk Box story has done exactly what I intended it to do when I posted it 20 years ago ... Which is to become an interactive horror story in real time". He "added new elements to the Dybbuk Box story over the years to help evolve it, keep it relevant and interesting".

== In film ==
- The Possession (2012)
- A Haunted House 2 (2014)
- Ezra (2017)
- Dybbuk Box: The Story of Chris Chambers (2019)
- Dybbuk (2021)
