= Dybbuk (film) =

2021 Indian horror film by Jay Krishnan

- Promotional poster
- Directed by: Jay K
- Written by: Jay K Chintan Gandhi (dialogues)
- Based on: Ezra; 2017 film by Jay K.
- Produced by: Bhushan Kumar; Krishan Kumar; Kumar Mangat Pathak; Abhishek Pathak
- Starring: Emraan Hashmi; Nikita Dutta
- Cinematography: Sathya Ponmar
- Edited by: Sandeep Francis
- Music by: Amar Mohile
- Production companies: T-Series; Panorama Studios
- Distributed by: Amazon Prime Video
- Release date: 29 October 2021
- Running time: 112 minutes
- Country: India
- Language: Hindi

Dybbuk is a 2021 Indian Hindi-language supernatural horror film written and directed by Jay K, produced by T-Series and Panorama Studios. The film, starring Emraan Hashmi and Nikita Dutta in the lead role, is a remake of Jay's 2017 Malayalam film Ezra. The story of the film revolves around an antique box purchased by the female protagonist, after which the couple face paranormal activities. The principal photography began on 18 July 2019 in Mauritius. The film premiered on 29 October 2021 on Amazon Prime Video.

== Synopsis ==
Mahi (Nikita Dutta), a newly married woman, brings an antique Jewish box into her home. When Mahi and her husband Sam (Emraan Hashmi) begin to have paranormal experiences, they soon learn that the box contained a dybbuk, an evil spirit. The couple then seeks the help of a rabbi to unravel its mystery and in order to survive the ordeal before their child is born.

== Cast ==
- Emraan Hashmi as Samuel "Sam" Isaac, an Indian Christian from Mumbai working as an executive at a nuclear waste disposal company in Mauritius.
- Nikita Dutta as Mahi Isaac (Nee 'Sood'), Sam's wife who is pregnant with her second child after a miscarriage. She comes in possession of an antique box (a dybbuk box) previously owned by the last Jew in Mauritius.
- Anil George as Rabbi Benyamin, rabbi at the Mumbai Chabad House, working in Réunion Island.
- Manav Kaul as Rabbi Markus, Benyamin's son, wanting to exorcise the dybbuk during Yom Kippur with the help of a hamsa locket.
- Yuri Suri as Yakub Ezra, a French Jew who came to Rodrigues Island during World War II, an expert in Kabbalah.
- Imaad Shah as Abraham Ezra, Yakub's son who falls in love with Norah, a Christian, and makes her pregnant out of wedlock. Her suicide due to the stigmatisation leads a Christian mob to attack him and his father. The attack leaves him invalid causing Yakub to turn Abraham into a dybbuk bent on destroying the island of Mauritius.
- Darshana Banik as Norah
- Alefia Kapadia as Darshana Sanghvi
- Gaurav Sharma as Inspector Riyaz Ahmed
- Denzil Smith as Father Gabriel
- Resh Lamba as Masood
- Bijay Anand as Sanjay
- Ivan Sylvester Rodrigues as Milind Sanghvi

== Production ==
In April 2019, it was officially confirmed that the Hindi remake of Malayalam film Ezra is to be produced by T-Series and Panorama Studios, featuring Emraan Hashmi in the lead role. Jay Krishnan, the director of original film to direct the remake and it will be shot in Mumbai and Mauritius. The film titled as Dybbuk, was sold to Amazon prime video for ₹360 million.

The filming began in July 2019 in Mauritius.

== Reception ==
=== Critical response ===
Renuka Vyavahare of The Times of India gave the film 2 (out of 5) stars and said,"Special effects are decent. Only if there was some surprise element to this mundane horror drama." Shubham Dwivedi of Pinkvilla gave the film 2 stars out of 5 and wrote," Dybbuk is an unenthusiastic horror tale that mends in its own mediocrity without even making an effort to rise above it. The film does not evoke any emotion out of a viewer." Shubhra Gupta of The Indian Express gave the film 1.5 stars out of 5 and said,"Based on the Malayalam film Ezra, this Emraan Hashmi-Nikita Dutt-starrer plays strictly by the numbers."

Tatsam Mukherjee, Author at Firstpost gave a rating of 1/5 and wrote, " Dybbuk, a Hindi remake of the Malayalam film Ezra, is riddled with amateurish 'twists' and hasty resolutions." Roktim Rajpal of Deccan Herald gave a rating of 2.5/5 and stated,"Like all remakes, Dybbuk caters to those who haven't seen the original version." Bollywood Hungama gave 2 stars and wrote," Dybbuk attempts to be an unconventional horror film but the not-so-scary second half and lengthy runtime spoil the show." Anuj Kumar from The Hindu website wrote,"The sincerity of filmmaker Jay K in addressing the science vs. logic bit is palpable, but the predictable storyline and cliched backstory make it a long wait till the climactic twist."
