= Falsafa: The Other Side =

- Directed by: Himanshu Yadav
- Written by: Himanshu Yadav
- Produced by: VK Yadav
- Starring: Manit Joura; Geetanjali Singh
- Cinematography: Nitish Chandra
- Edited by: Nitish Chandra
- Music by: Sagar Bhatia
- Production company: V K Motion Pictures
- Release date: 11 January 2019
- Country: India
- Language: Hindi

Falsafa: The Other Side is a 2019 Bollywood action thriller film directed by Himanshu Yadav and starring Manit Joura, Geetanjali Singh, Ridhima Grover and Sumit Gulati in the lead roles. The film was scheduled to release on 11 January 2019.

== Plot ==
Falsafa: The Other Side is a philosophical drama film about how wrong paths or evil decisions are taken in one moment of anger can change many lives. The lead characters of the film are Aman (Manit Joura), and Isha (Geetanjali Singh) whose quest for revenge intertwines their lives with each other. Aman's parents have been murdered, and he is on a quest to seek revenge. On the other hand, Isha's father is dead, and she's convinced that it's a murder. Will they make the right choice?

== Cast ==
The trailer launch of Falsafa: The Other Side was done by the team of the Zee TV Serial ‘Kundali Bhagya‘ at The View, in Andheri. The details of the cast of the film is given below.

- Manit Joura as Aman
- Geetanjali Singh as Isha
- Ridhima Grover as Sanjana
- Sumit Gulati as Rishabh
- Amitabh Srivastava as Aman’s Father
- Geeta Agarwal Sharma as Aman’s Mother
- Neeraj Kalra as Isha’s Father
- Sheetal Dimri as Isha’s Mother
- Tarun Dhingra as Mahadev
- Hareesh Chhabra as Anirudh
- Ambrish K Saxena as Girish
- Sushil Dahiya as Harish Bhatija
- Vijay Shrivastava as Inspector Kamra
- Dhaanvi as child Isha

== Music ==
The music director and lyricist of the film is Sagar Bhatia. The Background Music and choreography are done by Shantanu Sudame and Arvind Thakur, respectively. The Music label is Zee Music Company.

No.	Title	Lyrics	Music	Singer(s)	Length
1.	"Mohabbat"	Sagar Bhatia	Sagar Bhatia	Mohammed Irfan	4:26
2.	"Rubaru"	Sagar Bhatia	Sagar Bhatia	Rituraj Mohanty	4:13
Total length:					8:39
