= Tumhari Paakhi =

Indian television series

- Genre: Drama
- Created by: Sumeet Hukamchand Mittal; Shashi Mittal
- Based on: Naba Bidhan (New Ritual) by Saratchandra Chattopadhyay
- Written by: Saratchandra Chattopadhyay
- Directed by: Amit Gupta
- Creative director: Nitin Dwivedi
- Starring: Mohammed Iqbal Khan; Shraddha Arya; Varun Badola
- Opening theme: Ajaa Dhola Maaru Tarse by Sunidhi Chauhan Idea: Ruchika Kaushik
- Composer: Ritesh Rathore
- Country of origin: India
- Original language: Hindi
- No. of seasons: 1
- No. of episodes: 269

Production
- Executive producer: Afaaq
- Producers: Shashi Mittal; Sumeet Hukamchand Mittal
- Cinematography: Sudesh Kotian
- Editor: Pankaj Kathpal
- Running time: 20 minutes
- Production company: Shashi Sumeet Productions

Original release
- Network: Life OK
- Release: 11 November 2013 – 21 November 2014

Tumhari Paakhi (transl.: Your Paakhi) (International title: Forever Yours) is an Indian soap opera based on Saratchandra Chattopadhyay's novel Naba Bidhan (New Ritual) and produced by Shashi Sumeet Productions that was telecast on Life OK from 11 November 2013 to 21 November 2014. The series starred Shraddha Arya, Mohammed Iqbal Khan and Varun Badola.

== Plot ==
Two childhood friends, Anshumaan and Paakhi are forced to marry as children by their families. However, misunderstandings and tensions in the families leads them to separate and grow up in different cities and lifestyles.

=== 18 years later ===
Anshuman is a successful elite businessman. He has a 7-year-old son, named Ayaan from his second wife Meera, who died 3 years prior in an accident. Paakhi still longs for him and believes that one day Anshumaan will come to reunite with her. Anshumaan plans to marry Tanya, the daughter of a well-known businessman, leading to him finding out about his hidden child marriage's truth, as he cannot marry Tanya before divorcing Paakhi. Under pressure from the media, Anshumaan is forced to bring Paakhi to his house in order to save his reputation, with the intention of divorcing her while the latter refuses as she has always loved him. Paakhi finds it hard to fit in his way of living while having to face challenges thrown at her by Anshumaan's sister, Lavanya, but she finds solace in Girish (Lavanya's husband) who always supports her. Anshumaan gradually falls in love with her. Ayaan hates Paakhi, believing she wants to take his late mother's place in Anshumaan's life, but later develops a motherly bond with Paakhi.

Due to misunderstandings created by Tanya and Lavanya, Anshumaan is led to believe Paakhi is having an extra-marital affair and he questions her character. Paakhi is disappointed in Anshumaan for not trusting her, hence decides to leave the house. Anshumaan later realises his misconception and decides to bring Paakhi back. Paakhi unites Anshuman with Devki, his long-lost mother, who was abused and banished by his father. They both clear their misunderstandings and confess their love.

Anshuman's twin brother, Aryaman kills him. Shattered and heartbroken, Paakhi looks after Anshuman's businesses. Under her family's pressure, she later marries Anshuman's cousin, Veer Pratap Singh and adopts a troubled teenager, named Ria. However, Veer decides to divorce Paakhi, realising she can never move on from Anshuman. In the end, Paakhi begins living with his memories and Ayaan, declaring she will always love Anshuman, and fulfill all his duties and wishes.

== Cast ==
=== Main ===
- Shraddha Arya as Paakhi Rathore (née Shekhawat) : Suraj's sister, Anshumaan's widow and Veer's ex wife, Ayaan's step-mother; Ria's foster mother (2013-2014)
- Mohammed Iqbal Khan as
  - Anshumaan Rathore: Devki and Darshan's son, Lavanya and Aryaman's brother, Veer and Nadika's cousin, Meera's widower; Paakhi's first husband, Ayaan's father (2013-2014) (Dead)
  - Aryaman "Billu" Rathore: Devki and Darshan's son, Lavanya and Anshumaan's brother, Veer and Nadika's cousin (2014)
- Varun Badola as Veer Pratap Singh: Nadika's brother; Lavanya, Anshumaan and Aryaman's cousin; Paakhi's ex-husband; Keerti's ex-lover; Ayaan's step-father; Ria's foster father (2014)

=== Recurring ===
- Rukhsar Rehman as Lavanya Bhargava (née Rathore) : Devki and Darshan's daughter; Anshumaan and Aryaman's sister; Veer and Nadika's cousin; Girish's wife;Naina's step-mother (2013-2014)
- Sachin Shroff as Girish Bhargava: Lavanya's husband; Naina's father (2013-2014)
- Anita Raj as Devki / Anuja: Darshan's widow; Devdas's sister; Lavanya, Anshuman and Aryaman's mother (2014)
- Jasmine Avasia as Ria Pratap Singh:Keerti's daughter; Paakhi and Veer's adopted daughter (2014)
- Divyam Dama as Ayaan Rathore: Meera and Anshumaan's son; Paakhi and Veer's step-son (2013-2014)
- Madhura Naik as Tanya Rana: Vikrant's daughter, Anshumaan's former fiancé (2013-2014)
- Tej Sapru as Vikrant Rana: Tanya's father (2013)
- Vijay Kalvani as Ashok (2013-2014)
- Geetanjali Singh as Deepika (2014)
- Priyanka Bhole as Nadika Pratap Singh: Veer's sister; Lavanya, Anshumaan and Aryaman's cousin (2014)
- Pushkar Goggiaa as Prithvi Kumar Chopra (2014)
- Indraneil Sengupta as Rohan Bhasin (2014)
- Unknown as Darshan Singh Rathore: Devki's husband; Anshuman, Aryaman and Lavanya's father(2014)(Dead)
- Rishi Khurana as Suraj Shekhawat: Paakhi's brother (2013-2014)
- Dolly Minhas as Girish's aunt (2013)
- Vijayendra Kumeria as Vikram Rajawat (2014)
- Parakh Madan as Suman Saxena (2014)
