= Ezra (2017 film) =

2017 film written and directed by Jay K.

- Theatrical release poster
- Directed by: Jay K.
- Screenplay by: Manu Gopal; Jay K.
- Story by: Jay K.
- Produced by: A. V. Anoop; Mukesh R. Mehta; C. V. Sarathy
- Starring: Prithviraj Sukumaran; Tovino Thomas; Priya Anand; Sujith Shankar; Pranay Ranjan; Vijayaraghavan; Sudev Nair
- Narrated by: Indrajith Sukumaran
- Cinematography: Sujith Vaassudev
- Edited by: Vivek Harshan
- Music by: Songs: Rahul Raj; Sushin Shyam; Score: Sushin Shyam
- Production company: AVA productions
- Distributed by: E4 Entertainment
- Release date: 10 February 2017 (India)
- Running time: 150 minutes
- Country: India
- Language: Malayalam
- Box office: est. ₹50 crore

Ezra is a 2017 Indian Malayalam-language supernatural horror thriller film written and directed by Jay K (in his directorial debut). The film stars Prithviraj Sukumaran, Tovino Thomas, Priya Anand (in her Malayalam debut), Sujith Shankar, Vijayaraghavan and Sudev Nair in the leading roles. Principal photography began in late-June 2016. Major filming locations were Fort Cochin and Sri Lanka. The movie grossed ₹50 crore at the box-office. It was remade in Hindi in 2021 as Dybbuk. The film has been noted for similarities to the 2012 Hollywood film The Possession, which was based on a 2004 Los Angeles Times article by Leslie Gornstein about the allegedly haunted dybbuk box.

== Plot ==
After the death of the last Malabar Jew in Cochin, an antique seller steals from his house. Among the looted item is a strange box with Jewish inscriptions. At night, an unseen force from the box mauls and kills a worker in the shop. ACP Shafeer Ahammed is assigned the case but has no lead.

Ranjan Mathew, a nuclear waste management specialist based in Mumbai, is transferred to Kochi with his wife Priya Raghuram. Being both a Marathi and a Malayali, Priya finds it hard to adjust to the shift of environment. On a retail therapy, Priya buys the strange box from the antique shop. After she opens it, paranormal experiences begin.

After settling in, Ranjan invites Father Samuel, who looked after him as an orphan, to his house. Seeing the box, Samuel informs Ranjan that it is a Dybbuk box. Ranjan consults Rabbi David Benyamin in Mumbai. Rabbi Benyamin tells Ranjan that the Dybbuk only possesses people with mental instability or children under 3 years, and whoever exorcises the Dybbuk becomes its worst enemy. The next day, Rabbi Benyamin dies.

Ranjan learns that Priya is pregnant and realizes his child will be possessed by the dybbuk. Ranjan requests Rabbi Benyamin's son, Marques for help. Marques arrives in Kochi and learns the Dybbuk's name is Abraham Ezra, which is written on the box in Hebrew. Ranjan and Marques contacts Joshua Yehudi, a former friend of Rabbi Benyamin. He gives them a book detailing the story of Abraham Ezra in 1941 in the erstwhile state of Travancore–Cochin.

In a flashback, during his visit to Fort Cochin, a rich Jewish boy named Abraham Ezra and a poor Christian girl Rosy fall in love. Rosy becomes pregnant with his son, but hides it from everyone. Ezra's father Yakub Ezra refuses to let him marry Rosy because of their difference in statuses and beliefs. Months later, a depressed Ezra reluctantly writes to Rosy telling her to end the relationship. Rosy commits suicide in heartbreak.

Finding Ezra's letter, Rosy's father along with the villagers confronts the father-son duo. In the ensuing scrimmage, Rosy's father is killed and Ezra is declared brain-dead by the doctors. An enraged Yakub decides to take revenge on the town using black magic. He euthanizes his son and puts Ezra's soul into a Dybbuk box. A wooden mannequin is buried in Ezra's place, while his real body is dumped into the Arabian Sea by Yakub. The Dybbuk box eventually finds its way to Ranjan.

Marques and Samuel take Shafeer into confidence. After digging up Ezra's grave and finding the mannequin, they believe Abraham Ezra's story is true.

Later, it is revealed that it is not Priya, but Ranjan who has now been possessed by the spirit. Ranjan, as an orphan, had mental problems, and is vulnerable to the Dybbuk. The spirit, the group surmises, understands the meaning of Ranjan's job of handling nuclear waste, and plans to control him to destroy the city.

Marques, using Jewish exorcism rituals to exorcise Ranjan, sends the dybbuk back into the box. Marques and Shafeer throw the box into the ocean, like Ezra's body years ago. Priya gives birth to a healthy baby and she and Ranjan share the news with Marques, Shafeer and Samuel.

In a mid-credit scene, the box is found by two young men along the seashore. They carry it away, planning to open it.

== Cast ==
- Prithviraj Sukumaran as Ranjan Mathew
- Tovino Thomas as ACP Shafeer Ahammed IPS
- Priya Anand as Priya Raghuram Mathew (voiceover by Angel Shijoy)
- Sudev Nair as Abraham Yakub Ezra
- Sujith Shankar as Rabbi Marques (voiceover by Sunny Wayne)
- Vijayaraghavan as Fr. Samuel
- Pratap K. Pothen as Colonel Nambiar
- Babu Antony as Rabbi David Benyamin
- Sandeep Narayanan as Ranjan's friend and colleague
- Reina Maria as Lekha
- Bharat Dabholkar as Yakub Ezra
- Alencier Lopez as Moosa
- Ann Sheetal as Rosy
- Rajesh Sharma as Sabatti
- Thara Kalyan as Priya's mother
- Manikandan R Achari
- Balu Varghese

== Production ==
In February 2016, Jay K, who was an associate director to Rajeev Ravi, announced that he will make his directorial debut through a film called Ezra. It was announced that the film will be a horror thriller involving a love story and will explore the history of Jewish culture in Kerala. Jay K said that the film is not made to frighten the spectators, but has a strong plot. He also confirmed that the film will be dubbed in Tamil and Telugu languages. Mukesh R. Mehta, C. V. Sarathy and A. V. Anoop produce the film under the banner of E4 Entertainment and AVA Productions. Rahul Raj and Tirru were roped in for the music and cinematography respectively. But both of them left the project for reasons unknown. While Tirru left in the early stage of production, Rahul Raj left after giving the song Lailakame. The international distribution of Ezra was overseen by Josemon Simon.

== Box office ==
The film grossed ₹1.6 crore in the opening day and ₹2.5 crore on second day from Kerala box office. It grossed ₹15.02 crore in its first week from Kerala . The film grossed around ₹40 crore from Kerala box office. It grossed ₹50 crore from worldwide box office.

== Reception ==
=== Critical reception ===
K R Rajeesh of Nowrunning has given a 3.5/5 and praised it for the extensive paranormal research and visuals. Indian Express rated it at 3/5. Ezra not only tries to frighten the audience but it has got an extraordinary storyline, too. It also tells the history of the Jews who once lived in Kerala. The remarkable flashback stays as a feeling of sorrow in the audience. It describes how the caste system and discrimination of the society spoils the relationships between people.

== Music ==
Rahul Raj was signed as the composer of the film. He composed the song Lailakame and left the project for reasons unknown. Sushin Shyam, who had worked in Sapthmashree Thaskaraha was then selected to compose the background score in addition to two songs ("Thambiran" & "Irul Neelum").

The song Lailakame became a smash hit, prompting several cover versions, including one by Rahul Raj himself.

Ezra (Original Motion Picture Soundtrack)
No.	Title	Lyrics	Music	Singer(s)	Length
1.	"Lailakame"	Harinarayanan B K	Rahul Raj	Haricharan	4.16
2.	"Thambiran"	Vinayak Sasikumar	Sushin Shyam	Vipin Raveendran	4.07
3.	"Irulu Neelum Raave"	Anwar Ali	Sushin Shyam	Sachin Balu	4.22
Total length:					12.45

An album containing the background score for the film was released separately by Muzik247 in 2017.

Ezra (Original Background Score)
No.	Title	Length
1.	"The Last Jew"	2:34
2.	"Something Lurking In The Dark"	3:05
3.	"Ezra Title Music"	2:54
4.	"Vengeful Soul"	4:24
5.	"Key To The Hub"	1:14
6.	"Dybbuk"	3:26
7.	"Love"	1:57
8.	"Rabbi Marcus"	2:47
9.	"Search For The Untold Truth"	1:28
10.	"Abraham Ezra"	2:58
11.	"Betrayal"	3:00
12.	"Fate"	3:12
13.	"Salvation"	3:16
14.	"Exorcism"	3:19
15.	"Ezra Theme Music"	4:33
Total length:		44:12

== Remake ==
In April 2019, it was officially confirmed that the Hindi remake of the film Ezra has been commissioned by the production company Panorama Studios and has signed Emraan Hashmi to star in the lead role. Jay K. was signed to direct the remake as well. The film started shooting in Mauritius on 18 July 2019. The film titled as Dybbuk premiered on Amazon Prime Video on 29 October 2021.
