= Dil Dosti Aur Dogs =

Indian Hindi-language comedy-drama film

- Promotional release poster
- Directed by: Viral Shah
- Produced by: Jyoti Deshpande; Masumeh Makhija; Viral Shah
- Starring: Tinnu Anand; Neena Gupta; Ehan Bhat; Sharad Kelkar; Tridha Choudhury; Kunaal Roy Kapur; Keerti Gaekwad Kelkar; Masumeh Makhija
- Production companies: Jio Studios; The Creative Tribe
- Release date: 28 February 2025
- Country: India
- Language: Hindi

Dil Dosti Aur Dogs is a 2025 Indian Hindi-language comedy‑drama film directed by Viral Shah and produced by Jyoti Deshpande, Masumeh Makhija, and Shah under Jio Studios and The Creative Tribe. The film features Tinnu Anand, Neena Gupta, Ehan Bhat, Sharad Kelkar.

The film was theatrically released in India, on 28 February 2025.

== Cast ==
- Tinnu Anand as Counsellor
- Neena Gupta as Laurence Bethany Margaret
- Ehan Bhat as Sunny
- Sharad Kelkar as Sanjay
- Tridha Choudhury as Rebecca
- Kunaal Roy Kapur as Arjun Kamat
- Keerti Gaekwad Kelkar as Neelima
- Masumeh Makhija as Ekta Sanjay Kamat
- Moumita Pal
- Avyana Chhorwani

== Plot ==
The film weaves together four interlinked storylines, each focusing on characters whose lives are transformed by their relationship with dogs. A married couple struggling with their relationship adopts a dog in hopes of rekindling their connection. A young girl, trying to gain her stepfather's affection, finds an unlikely ally in a stray dog. An elderly widow, living in solitude, discovers companionship and a renewed sense of purpose when a dog enters her life. Meanwhile, a hotel manager with a deep fear of dogs begins volunteering at an animal shelter, leading to self-discovery and unexpected romance. Each story highlights the transformative, power of love, friendship, and healing through the unconditional loyalty of dogs.

== Reception ==
Archika Khurana from The Times of India rated it 2.0/5, calling it a heartwarming concept weakened by shallow storytelling, underdeveloped characters, and uninspired performances. While the dogs add charm, the film fails to leave an emotional impact.

Sameer Ahire from MovieTalkies rated the film 2.5/5, noting that while the film evokes emotion and has its heart in the right place, it suffers from childish scenes, over-the-top drama, and inconsistent storytelling that often feels forced and unnecessary.
