= Dil Toh Happy Hai Ji =

Indian Hindi-language television series

- Created by: Gul Khan
- Directed by: Arif Ali Ansari
- Starring: Jasmin Bhasin; Ansh Bagri; Donal Bisht; Aru Krishansh Verma
- Country of origin: India
- Original language: Hindi
- No. of seasons: 1
- No. of episodes: 148

Production
- Producers: Gul Khan; Nilanjana Purkayasstha; Karishma Jain
- Production location: Mumbai
- Camera setup: Multiple-camera setup
- Running time: 22 min approx
- Production companies: 4 Lions Films; Invictus T Mediaworks

Original release
- Network: StarPlus
- Release: 15 January – 9 August 2019

Dil Toh Happy Hai Ji is an Indian drama television series created by Gul Khan under 4 Lions Films and available on Disney+ Hotstar. The series aired from 15 January to 9 August 2019 on StarPlus and starred Jasmin Bhasin, Donal Bisht, Ansh Bagri and Rohit Purohit.

== Plot ==
Happy Mehra is a free-spirited middle-class girl. Rocky Khosla is a playboy and an arrogant goon. Happy constantly butts head with Rocky. On the other hand, Rocky's kind-hearted elder brother Chintu falls in love with Happy and befriends her. She and Chintu get married as she learns about his feelings. However, he dies in an accident.

Chintu and Rocky's father, Kulwant, blames Rocky for the accident and disowns him. Rocky sets up a hotel to fulfill Chintu's dream. Happy joins him and they slowly become friends. Ranvijay Shroff, a famous lawyer fighting for righteousness of society, starts falling for Happy. Rocky is falsely accused of molesting Happy's sister, Smiley, and jailed for ten years.

Three years later, Happy is running the hotel successfully and has a solid friendship with Ranvijay. After escaping prison, Rocky is jealous of Happy and Ranvijay's bond and proves his innocence. He realises his feelings for Happy and decides to confess. However, Ranvijay is obsessed with Happy, so he kills his brother Ranveer and his girlfriend Anaya. Happy starts believing that everyone she knows is dying because of her, and that they will be safer without her in their life. Happy fakes her death to leave the city and to send Ranvijay to jail. Rocky is heartbroken.

Six years later, Happy is a RJ, known as Khushi (which is the Hindi word for "Happy"). Rocky has a wife, Harleen, whom he dislikes and is still mourning Happy. Harleen hates their son, Honey, as she never wanted a child. Honey runs away and meets Happy, who looks after him. She finds out about him being Rocky's son. Rocky learns that Happy is alive. Kumar tries to shoot Honey. Harleen comes in between to save him and dies. Happy proposes to Rocky and they get married.

== Cast ==
=== Main characters ===
- Jasmin Bhasin / Donal Bisht as Happy Mehra: Sandhya and Harshdeep's elder daughter; Smiley's sister; Dinky, Neha, Anjali, Kajal and Rupinder's cousin, Chintu's widow, Rocky's wife; Honey's stepmother
- Ansh Bagri as Rocky Khosla / Saluja: Madhu and Kulwant's adopted son; Chintu, Simmi and Guggi's adopted brother; Harleen's widower; Happy's husband; Honey's father
- Aru K Verma as Chintu Khosla: Madhu and Kulwant's son; Rocky's adoptive brother; Simmi and Guggi's brother; Daddu's cousin; Happy's first husband
- Rohit Purohit as Ranvijay "RV" Shroff - Ranveer's brother and murderer; Anaya's boyfriend and murderer; Happy's one-sided obsessive lover
- Purvi Mundada as Harleen Rocky Saluja - Rocky's deceased wife; Honey's mother
- Ajinkya Mishra as Honey Rocky Saluja - Harleen and Rocky's son; Happy's stepson

=== Recurring characters ===
- Iris Maity as Anaya Grover - Sanjay's daughter and RV's deceased girlfriend
- Geetu Bawa as Sandhya Mehra - Harshdeep's widow; Happy and Smiley's mother
- Ankushi Gagneja as Smiley Mehra - Sandhya and Harshdeep's younger daughter; Happy's sister; Dinky, Neha, Anjali, Kajal and Rupinder's cousin; Daddu's fiancée
- Geetanjali Singh as Diana "Dinky" Mehra - Jasvir's daughter; Anjali and Neha's sister; Happy, Smiley, Kajal and Rupinder's cousin.
- Aruna Irani as Sushmita Devi Khosla - Brijwant's widow; Kulwant and Balwant's mother; Chintu, Simmi, Daddu and Guggi's grandmother; Rocky's adoptive grandmother
- Satyajit Sharma as Kulwant Khosla - Sushmita and Trilok's elder son; Balwant's brother; Madhu's husband; Chintu, Simmi and Guggi's father; Rocky's adoptive father
- Rudrakshi Gupta as Madhavi "Madhu" Khosla - Kulwant's wife; Chintu, Simmi and Guggi's mother; Rocky's adoptive mother
- Sejal Sharma as Simran "Simmi" Khosla - Madhu and Kulwant's daughter; Chintu's younger sister and Guggi's twin sister; Rocky's adoptive sister
- Khushi Mishra as Gurdeep "Guggi" Khosla: Madhu and Kulwant's daughter; Chintu's younger sister and Simmi's twin sister; Rocky's adoptive sister
- Minoli Nandwana as Anjali Mehra
- Neha Luthra as Neha Mehra
- Akshita Vatsayan as Kajal Mehra
- Karan Singh Chabbra as Timmi
- Shubham Chandna as Sachin
- Hitanshu Jinsi as Baldeep Khosla
- Karan Taneja as Rupinder Mehra
- Manish Khanna as Shyamnik Bhatia
- Shresth Kumar as Ranveer Shroff
- Akansha Sareen as Sania Shyamnik Bhatia
- Anang Desai as Sanjay Grover
- Deepali Pansare as Meenu - Kabir's wife
- Romanch Mehta as Kabir - Meenu's husband

== Development ==
Talking about her show Dil Toh Happy Hai Ji, Jasmin Bhasin stated, “In a time when supernatural dramas are taking charge, Dil Toh Happy Hai Ji is a slice-of-life story. I have grown up watching such shows and I am sure the audience will love it too. We are making it with full honesty and heart. I am sure everyone will relate to it and enjoy it.”

In June 2019, on introduction of a 6 years leap in storyline, Jasmin Bhasin was uncomfortable playing a mother and thus she was replaced by Donal Bisht. Producer Gul Khan confirmed, "Jasmin was not okay bonding with a child in the show. Even though she had agreed on the story line, on scene level she was uncomfortable. We do not want any actor to be uncomfortable or unhappy while shooting. So we amicably parted ways. We wish her all the best." The show was aired as Happy Hearts on Star Life of Africa
