= Shashank Vyas =

Indian actor (born 1986)

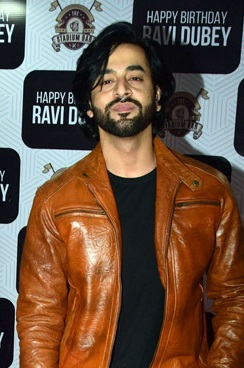
- Vyas in 2017
- Born: 30 November 1986 (age 39); Ujjain, Madhya Pradesh, India
- Occupation: Actor
- Years active: 2010–present
- Known for: Balika Vadhu; Jaana Na Dil Se Door; Roop – Mard Ka Naya Swaroop

Shashank Vyas (born 30 November 1986) is an Indian actor known for playing Dr. Jagdish "Jagya" Singh in Balika Vadhu, Captain Ravish Vashisht in Jaana Na Dil Se Door and Roopendra "Roop" Singh Vaghela in Roop – Mard Ka Naya Swaroop.

== Early life ==
Shashank Vyas was born on 30 November 1986 to Vikas K. Vyas in Ujjain, Madhya Pradesh. He graduated from Maharaja Ranjit Singh College, Indore and started studying for MBA entrance exams. Later he pursued his acting career upon the encouragement of a friend.

== Career ==
=== Debut and breakthrough (2010–2015) ===
Vyas made his debut in 2010 with the role of Jagdish "Jagya" Singh opposite Pratyusha Banerjee in Colors TV's Balika Vadhu. Jagya's character was central to the show's narrative and underwent significant development throughout its run. Initially portrayed as a young boy with traditional values and a close bond with his family, Jagya's character evolved as he faced numerous challenges and dilemmas. His portrayal of Jagya earned him widespread recognition and popularity, including several awards and nominations. His onscreen chemistry with Pratyusha Banerjee, Sriti Jha and Sargun Mehta was much appreciated. He was paired opposite nine actress in the same show due to the show's ever-changing tracks and replacement of heroines. He left the show in 2015 after donning the role of Jagya for five years. He felt that his character had nothing new to offer and there was nothing left to explore.

=== Acclaim and established actor (2016–2019) ===
In 2016, he portrayed the character Captain Ravish Vashisht opposite Shivani Surve in Star Plus's popular Indian television series Jana Na Dil Se Door. Captain Ravish Vashisht was a pivotal character in the show, known for his strong sense of duty, integrity, and unwavering commitment to his responsibilities. Ravish, an officer in the Indian Army, exemplified the qualities of a dedicated soldier and a loving family man. Shashank Vyas brought depth and authenticity to the character, effectively portraying Ravish's emotional journey as he navigated the complexities of his personal and professional life. Throughout the series, Shashank's performance as Captain Ravish Vashisht resonated with the audience, as he portrayed the character's struggles, sacrifices, and moments of strength. His portrayal added depth to the storyline and earned him acclaim for his ability to convey a wide range of emotions. His role contributed significantly to the show's success, and his compelling performance remains a memorable part of Indian television. He left the show in May 2017, one month before show went off-air.

From 2018 to 2019, he essayed the character Roopendra "Roop" Singh Vaghela opposite Donal Bisht in Colors TV's Roop: Mard Ka Naya Swaroop. His portrayal of Roop was both charismatic and socially relevant, contributing to the show's popularity and acclaim. Roop, the central character of the series, was depicted as a young boy challenging societal norms and gender stereotypes. Vyas skilfully portrayed Roop's journey of self-discovery and personal growth as he defied traditional expectations by embracing household chores and demonstrating that masculinity should not be defined by stereotypes. Throughout the series, Shashank's performance effectively showcased Roop's determination to break free from societal constraints and his unwavering commitment to justice and equality. His portrayal highlighted the importance of progressive thinking and gender equality, making Roop a relatable and inspirational character. His role was marked by his ability to convey complex emotions, deliver powerful social messages, and entertain the audience. His performance added depth to the character and resonated with viewers, earning him recognition and appreciation for his impactful portrayal.

He also appeared in a short film titled 'Ek Mulaqat' in July 2019, where he played character Avi Malhotra opposite Adaa Khan.

=== Further expansion (2023-) ===
In September 2023, Vyas made his music video debut with T-Series's song 'Bhula du' opposite Ihana Dhillon, sung by Stebin Ben and Payal Dev, written by Sayeed Quadri.

== Media image ==
Vyas was featured in the Top Sexiest Asian Men 2017 list released by London-based magazine Eastern Eye. In 2018, he was listed 14th in The Times Of India 20 Most Desirable Men of TV. He was also featured in Top Most Desirable Men of Indian Television 2020 list.

== Filmography ==
=== Films ===
Year	Title	Role	Notes	Ref.
2010	Tees Maar Khan	Teenage villager		
2019	Ek Mulaqat	Avi Malhotra	Short film	

=== Television ===
Year	Title	Role	Notes	Ref.
2010–2015	Balika Vadhu	Dr. Jagdish "Jagya" Singh		
2014–2015	Box Cricket League 1	Contestant		
2016–2017	Jaana Na Dil Se Door	Captain Ravish Vashisht		
2018–2019	Roop – Mard Ka Naya Swaroop	Roopendra "Roop" Singh Vaghela		
2018	Shakti – Astitva Ke Ehsaas Ki	Roopendra "Roop" Singh Vaghela	Special appearance	

=== Web series ===
Year	Title	Role	Notes	Ref.
2024	Citadel: Honey Bunny	Vivek		

=== Music videos ===
Year	Title	Singer(s)	Label	Ref(s)
2023	Bhula Du	Stebin Ben, Payal Dev	T-Series	

== Awards and nominations ==
Year	Work	Award	Category	Result
2010	Balika Vadhu	Gold Awards	Best Debut in Lead Role (Male)	Nominated
2010	Balika Vadhu	Indian Telly Awards	Best Fresh New Face (Male)	Nominated
2011	Balika Vadhu	Indian Telly Awards	Popular Couple On-Screen (with Pratyusha Banerjee)	Won
2011	Balika Vadhu	The Global Indian Film And TV Honours	Best Fresh New Face (Male)	Won
2011	Balika Vadhu	Golden Petal Awards	Most Lokpriya Jodi (with Pratyusha Banerjee)	Nominated
2011	Balika Vadhu	Golden Petal Awards	Favourite Face (Male)	Nominated
2011	Balika Vadhu	New Talent Awards	Best Debut (Male)	Nominated
2011	Balika Vadhu	New Talent Awards	Best On Screen Pair (with Pratyusha Banerjee)	Won
2012	Balika Vadhu	Golden Petal Awards	Most Damdar Personality	Nominated
2012	Balika Vadhu	Golden Petal Awards	Best Character Portrayal (Jagdish)	Won
2013	Balika Vadhu	Golden Petal Awards	Most Janbaaz Personality	Nominated
2017	Jaana Na Dil Se Door	Perfect Achievers Awards	Best Actor (Male)	Won
2019	Roop – Mard Ka Naya Swaroop	Golden Petal Awards	Best Actor (Male)	Nominated
