= 99 Songs =

Indian musical romance film by A R Rahman

- Theatrical release poster
- Directed by: Vishwesh Krishnamoorthy
- Screenplay by: Vishwesh Krishnamoorthy
- Dialogues by: Hussain Dalal
- Story by: A. R. Rahman; Vishwesh Krishnamoorthy
- Produced by: A. R. Rahman
- Starring: Ehan Bhat; Edilsy Vargas
- Cinematography: Tanay Satam; James Cowley
- Edited by: Akshay Mehta; Shreyas Beltangdy
- Music by: A. R. Rahman
- Production companies: Ideal Entertainment; YM Movies
- Distributed by: Jio Studios
- Release dates: 9 October 2019 (Busan); 16 April 2021 (India)
- Running time: 131 minutes
- Country: India
- Language: Hindi

99 Songs is a 2021 Indian Hindi-language musical romance film directed by Vishwesh Krishnamoorthy, and co-written and produced by A. R. Rahman (in his maiden production banner YM Movies), who thus makes his debut in both roles, apart from composing the original score and songs. The film co-produced by Ideal Entertainment and distributed by Jio Studios, stars debutants Ehan Bhat and Edilsy Vargas in lead roles, alongside Aditya Seal, Lisa Ray and Manisha Koirala among others in supporting roles. The film is a sensual story about the art and self-discovery of a struggling singer who wants to be a successful music composer.

Rahman had written the script for the film in 2011, and Eros International initially announced plans to produce the film in August 2013. After Eros backed out of the project, Rahman stated that he will produce the film under his own banner, YM Movies. This film is the debut directorial of Vishwesh, who worked as an advertisement filmmaker before Rahman offered him to direct his production. Vishwesh, who is also a musician, is well known for the Mumbai-based hardcore band Scribe. The scripting and finalizing process continued until four years before the film was officially announced in June 2015. The casting process was done by Mukesh Chhabra; around 1,000 auditions took place until the makers finalized Ehan and Edilsy as the lead actors.

Production of the film silently progressed in March 2017 and ended within a year. The cinematography for the film was jointly handled by Tanay Satam and James Cowley, while editing was done by Akshay Mehta and Shreyas Beltangdy. The dialogue for the film was written by Hussain Dalal.

The world premiere of 99 Songs was held at the 24th Busan International Film Festival which was held in Busan, South Korea, where the film was screened in the Open Cinema category on 9 October 2019. The film was released on 16 April 2021.

== Cast ==
- Ehan Bhat as Jay
- Edilsy Vargas as Sophia Singhania / Sophie, Jay's love-interest
- Tenzin Dalha as Polo Longjam, Jay's friend
- Lisa Ray as Sheila
- Manisha Koirala as Psychologist
- Warina Hussain as Jay's late mother (guest appearance)
- Thomson Andrews
- Ranjit Barot as Sanjay Singhania (Sanju), Sophie's father
- Rahul Ram as Music Teacher
- Diwakar Pundir as Jay's late father (guest appearance)
- Remo Fernandes
- Ashwath Bhatt as CM Ashwath Prabhakar
- Kurush Deboo as Musical Instrument Store Owner - Furtados
- Neel Tyagi as Young Jay
- Chaitnya Sharma as Ricky Punjabi
- Kunal Kamra

== Production ==
=== Development ===
A. R. Rahman who had launched his newly based production company YM Movies announced in August 2013, that he will be producing a script which he had written in 2011 (which marked Rahman's maiden stint as a scriptwriter) and will also take charge of the film's music. It is touted to be a young sensual story based on love, art and self-discovery, and will feature international and local talents. Rahman decided to team up with Sunil Lulla of Eros International to co-produce the film, with Rahman stating that "It is a 16-year relation with Eros and this time it's extending the role a bit more". Despite Eros acquired some of Rahman's films including Kochadaiiyaan and Lekar Hum Deewana Dil, the producers opted out of the project due to financial constraints and in July 2014, Rahman had announced that he had finalised the draft of the script being a musical film. He further stated that he will not direct this project, and may bring in a core team who have musical nuances.

Writing is the nucleus of any project. It is the core vision behind any film! Since my movie is a musical, it needed a really strong script to bring it to life and create an impact.

— A. R. Rahman, on penning the script for the first time in an interview with Deccan Chronicle.

Rahman had planned to sign in advertisement filmmaker and Scribe band vocalist Vishwesh Krishnamoorthy on board to direct his first feature film. Vishwesh who is known for directing the teleseries Bring on the Night and The Dewarist had also expressed his interest in making a feature film, for which he left the musical band. Rahman announced the same in December 2014 at the music launch event of the Hindi version of I, although he did not reveal the director's name in public. In June 2015, the project was officially titled as 99 Songs after the completion of the scripting and finalizing process which took four years. In August 2015, it was confirmed that the plot would be musically laden, with film score by Rahman. However, the film won't be a biopic on him but, it features a journey of a struggling singer, with the problems faced in his quest to be a successful composer, said Rahman in an interview, further adding that, the film would have a love story inclined to art, passion and realizing one's true capabilities.

=== Casting ===
After the project was announced in 2015, the makers began casting process in Mumbai for which the production house demanded a South Indian actor to play the male lead musician who had basic understanding of music too, also adding that, the supporting cast will have international musicians and actors. A first look of the poster which released in March 2016, featured a boy flying in mid-air holding a girl's hand in one and an afloat piano in the other, although the details regarding the lead pair were undeciphered.

Vishwesh Krishnamoorthy had planned three Pakistani actors to play the lead role in the film, but Rahman was apprehensive that it might cause problem for the project. It was due to the 2016 Indian Line of Control strike, followed by which the Indian Motion Picture Producers Association banned all Pakistani actors and technicians from working in India and many films featuring Pakistani actors which included Karan Johar's Ae Dil Hai Mushkil, (Note: Fawad Khan was one of the primary cast members in the film.) faced threats from exhibitors and activists, citing this reason. With the help of casting director Mukesh Chhabra, more than 1,000 auditions took place before the makers finalized debutants Ehan Bhat and Edilsy Vargas, as the lead actors of the film in October 2017.

Ehan Bhat was trained for composing piano at Rahman's musical institute KM Music Conservatory in Chennai for more than year, since his role required musical expertise. He was sent to Los Angeles for training from acting and success coach Bernard Hiller. The lead actors have undergone special training at a leading acting school in Hollywood. The teaser of the film released during December 2017 at a musical concert in Ahmedabad, featured the lead cast members along with Tenzin Dalha, Aditya Seal, Manisha Koirala and Lisa Ray along with renowned musicians Ranjit Barot, Rahul Ram, Thomson Andrews, Remo Fernandes among others. Rahman shared the news of the lead actor Ehan in his official Instagram post in April 2019.

=== Filming ===
The project was expected to kickstart production in the end of 2015 after completing Rahman's works in Tamasha and Mohenjo Daro, however the delay over the casting process had prompted the makers to put the shoot on hold. Later the principal photography of the film began on 10 March 2017. Shooting of major portions of the film had silently progressed in India, and when Rahman on announcing the cast, he further added the team had completed a long shooting schedule in Ukraine. The makers have completed 90% of portions as of October 2017, with the exception of patchwork scenes and some other sequences which were wrapped up within mid 2018.

== Music ==
The background music and soundtrack for the film was composed by A. R. Rahman. The album which was in production since 2015, consists of 14 original compositions for each language (Hindi, Tamil and Telugu). The lyrics for the original Hindi version were penned by Navneet Virk, Abhay Jodhpurkar, Dilshaad Shabbbir Shaikh, Raftaar, Munna Shaukat, while the lyrics for the Tamil version were penned by Madhan Karky, Thamarai and Mashook Rahman and Telugu version was penned by Anantha Sriram and Rakendu Mouli.

99 Songs became the first Indian soundtrack album to be released in Dolby Atmos Technology. After five singles – "Sai Shirdi Sai", the theme song from the film titled "The Oracle" the male and female versions of "Jwalamukhi" and "Teri Nazar" – were released on 5 April 2019, 14, 20 and 26 February and 13 March 2020, the full soundtrack in its entirety was released by Sony Music India on 20 March 2020.

Rahman launched the tracklist of the Tamil version on 24 March 2021, with the album being released on 26 March, and the Telugu version on 2 April. It was followed by a promotional event for the launch of both the soundtracks took place on the respective days.

== Marketing ==
The team released separate posters featuring Ehan and Edilsy in October 2017, and at Rahman's musical concert in Ahmedabad on 3 December 2017, the makers released the film's teaser featuring the official cast and crew. After Rahman officially announced Ehan Bhat through social media, the actor joined the composer on the reality show The Voice which telecasted on Star Plus.

The official trailer of the film released on 10 February 2020. Rahman posted the trailer in his Twitter account stating that it is a "musical ode to all the artistes around the world". The trailer unanimously received applause from viewers, praising the graphics, cinematography and background score, making it as "musically and visually stunning". However, the team did not confirm the final release date through its trailer.

Rahman and Ehan promoted the film's music concert held in Mumbai on 19 March 2021, and the second trailer of the film was unveiled during the event in Hindi, Tamil and Telugu languages. A promotional event for the film's dubbed Tamil and Telugu versions took place in Chennai and Hyderabad on 26 March 2021. The promotions for the Tamil version which held in Chennai had seen the appearances of noted film personalities which included S. Shankar, Mani Ratnam, Gautham Vasudev Menon, Sivakarthikeyan, S. J. Suryah, Vignesh Shivan, Anirudh Ravichander, G. V. Prakash Kumar and Yuvan Shankar Raja attending the event.

== Release ==
Originally scheduled for a theatrical release on early 2018, there was no official confirmation revealed about the release plans until on 11 April 2019, Rahman had announced that 99 Songs will be released worldwide on 21 June 2019 (World Music Day). However, on 13 June 2019, eight days prior to the slated release of the film, Rahman announced that the scheduled release will be postponed as the visual effects of the film has not been completed. The film was premiered at the 24th Busan International Film Festival, held at Busan, South Korea, where the film's screening took place at the Open Cinema category on 9 October 2019.

Jio Studios acquired the international distribution rights of the film and planned to release in Hindi, Tamil and Telugu languages. The film was further delayed due to the COVID-19 pandemic, and Rahman had planned to release directly through Netflix as theatres being shut down due to the lockdown, which also failed to happen. On 11 March 2021, the makers had announced that the film will be scheduled for a theatrical release on 16 April 2021.

Despite, restrictions due to second wave of coronavirus, Rahman insisted to release 99 Songs in theatres, as he stated that "it is a cinematic experience meant for the big screen". The film had a fragmented release with only its dubbed Tamil and Telugu versions released theatrically on 16 April. The original Hindi version had a fragmented release, as theatres in Mumbai and Delhi were shut in order to curb coronavirus pandemic. The special premiere of the Tamil version was held at Sathyam Cinemas in Chennai, which saw the attendance of Keerthy Suresh, Vijay Sethupathi, Gautham Vasudev Menon and Silambarasan. Many celebrities such as Dhanush and Rajinikanth amongst others in the film fraternity praised the film.

== Reception ==
On the review aggregator website Rotten Tomatoes, 86% of 7 critics' reviews are positive, with an average rating of 5.8/10.

M. Suganth, editor-in-chief of The Times of India gave three out of five stars saying, "even though the final portions, like the beginning, feel rushed, Rahman's entrancing music and the spectacular visuals keep us glued till the end." Similarly, Ronak Kotecha, writing for the same entertainment website, had stated, " '99 Songs' has all the elements of an emotional love story with music at its core. With better songs and more conviction in its execution, this one had all the potential to become a chart-topper." Avinash Ramachandran of The New Indian Express wrote, "With raw performers with a lot of talent, a stellar support cast, and Rahman’s brilliant music, 99 Songs could have been the Rockstar of our times. But courtesy a few missteps, it falls into that special category of Rahman films that we often see crop up on social media — films that don’t quite do justice to Rahman’s music."

Behindwoods gave 2.75 out of five and gave a verdict, "Innovations to a pre-existing template and AR Rahman's out of the world music makes '99 Songs' a worthy watch." Pradeep Kumar of The Hindu stated, "Rahman's debut effort as a writer falls way short of being an engaging film." Baradwaj Rangan of Film Companion South wrote, "The film is about music and its power to heal the world, to consume a person in a way they can’t really explain." Nandini Ramanath of Scroll.in wrote, "Despite an impressive performance by lead actor Ehan Bhat and several soulful tunes, 99 Songs is that rare beast – an uninvolving saga about the joys and healing power of music."

Saibal Chatterjee of NDTV gave two-and-a-half out of five saying, "99 Songs is a visual and musical treat infused with a sense of poise and repose. But its surface gloss cannot conceal the fact that it delivers far less than it promises." Udita Jhunjhunwala of Firstpost gave three out of five and summarised, "Ehan Bhat's impassioned performance in 99 Songs complements AR Rahman and the director's vision." Umesh Punwani of Koimoi gave one out of five and stated the film as a "melodious misfire." Moumita Bhattacharjee of Rediff.com gave two out of five stars saying, "mesmerising music distracts you from its sketchy screenplay and bland story." Urmila Bannerjee of BollywoodLife gave two out of five and stated, "AR Rahman tells a story loaded with emotions but sadly the execution does not leave a strong impression."
