= Ek Duje Ke Vaaste =

2016 Indian romantic television series

- Genre: Drama
- Created by: Bindu and SJ Studios
- Written by: Dilip Jha; Archita Jha; Shobhit Jaiswal; Rajesh Chawla; Sameer Mishra; Pallavi Sharma
- Directed by: Ranjeet Gupta; Aijaz A Shaik
- Creative director: Uday Berry
- Starring: Nikita Dutta; Namik Paul; Aditi Rathore; Palak Jain
- Opening theme: Ek Duje Ke Vaaste
- Composer: Sachin–Jigar
- Country of origin: India
- Original language: Hindi
- No. of seasons: 2
- No. of episodes: 155

Production
- Producers: Dilip Jha; Archita Jha SJ Studios
- Production locations: Delhi; Mumbai
- Editor: Rocchak Ahuja
- Running time: 21–22 Minutes
- Production companies: Bindu and SJ STUDIOS

Original release
- Network: Sony Entertainment Television
- Release: 29 February – 7 October 2016

Related
- Ek Duje Ke Vaaste 2

Ek Duje Ke Vaaste (transl. For the sake of each other) is an Indian Hindi-language romantic television series which aired on Sony TV from 29 February 2016 to 7 October 2016.

The female and male protagonists were played by Nikita Dutta and Namik Paul, respectively. The plot revolves around two childhood friends and follows their struggles to unite as lovers once they grow up. The series title track was composed by the duo Sachin–Jigar and sung by Jubin Nautiyal.

The show was dubbed into Tamil as Nee Varuvai Ena (English: I'm Waiting for You) in 2017 and aired on Polimer TV. The production is followed by a rebooted sequel, Ek Duje Ke Vaaste 2, where Shravan and Suman are recharacterized as teenagers attending school, with a military background.

== Plot ==
Suman comes from a close-knit family and has been brought up by her grandfather as a strong, independent, and self-respecting girl after her parents died in an accident. Shravan is a Malhotra, an elite family of two brothers—Ramnath and Lala Ji, and their wives and sons—Shravan, Varun, and Pushkar. Suman's grandfather was a mentor to Shravan's father, Ramnath, and the two share a strong bond.

Growing up together, Shravan and Suman are separated when Shravan leaves for London to practise law after his parents, Nirmala and Ramnath, separate. He returns ten years later, and Suman discovers he has changed. She apologises to him for not being there for him, but he rejects her. At a school reunion, he insults Suman, after which they part ways until Suman's house is in danger of being sold. Shravan fights the court case and wins, and the two rekindle their friendship. Suman tries to reunite Shravan with his mother, but he believes his father's side of the story. A possessive Ramnath becomes upset with Suman and successfully drives a wedge between Shravan and her.

Suman's cousin Preeti falls in love with Pushkar, and they are able to convince their reluctant families to accept the union. Suman's grandfather suffers a heart attack and makes Suman promise him that she will marry Aditya, a family friend. Aditya, Shravan's foster brother who was brought up by Shravan's mother, becomes suspicious of Suman and Shravan's relationship after being incited by Shravan's aunt Kamini.

Following an instance of Aditya misbehaving with Suman, their wedding is called off. Sensing Suman's grandfather's condition, Shravan marries Suman. Over time, Ramnath realises how his lies have made Shravan a misogynist who mistreats the women in his life. Guilt-ridden, he comes clean to Shravan, who asks Suman for forgiveness. The two happily confess their love for each other and unite.

== Cast and characters ==
=== Main ===
- Namik Paul as Shravan Malhotra
  - Vishal Jethwa as Young Shravan
- Nikita Dutta as Suman Shravan Malhotra
  - Palak Jain as Young Suman

=== Recurring ===
- Madan Joshi as Raghuveer Tiwari, Suman's Nanaji
- Satyajit Sharma as Ramnath Malhotra, Shravan's father
- Geetanjali Tikekar as Nirmala Ramnath Malhotra, Shravan's mother
- Ronit Kapil as Aditya Ahuja, Nirmala's foster son
- Rajiv Kumar as Dharamnath Malhotra, Shravan's uncle
- Anjali Mukhi as Kamini Malhotra, Shravan's aunt
- Ranjeet Singh as Pushkar Malhotra, Shravan's cousin and Preeti's husband
- Aditi Rathore as Preeti Pushkar Malhotra, Suman's cousin and Pushkar's wife
- Sanjeev Jogtiyani as Sanjeev Tiwari, Suman's Mamaji
- Geeta Tyagi as Manju Tiwari, Suman's Mamiji
- Atharva Phadnis as Aditya "Dabboo" Tiwari, Suman's cousin
- Akkash Bharadwaj as Premal Choudhry, Suman's Mausaji (2016)
- Bhanu Kukreja as Sulangna Premal Choudhry, Suman's Mausiji (2016)
- Khushboo Shroff as Preeta (2016)
- Avtar Gill as Khosla (2016)
- Hirdeyjeet Jarnail Singh as Shastri ji (2016)
- Shraddha Jaiswal as Vandana "Vandy" Malhotra (2016)
- Karan Sharma as Varun Malhotra (2016)
- Charvi Saraf as Urvashi (2016)
- Ahmad Harhash as Varun Kumar, Nirmala's foster son (2016)

== Soundtrack ==
The series title track was composed by the duo Sachin–Jigar and sung by Jubin Nautiyal.

No.	Title	Singer	Length
1.	"Kyun Hai Dabhi Si Khwaishen"		1.10
2.	"Zindagi Kahan Kahan Se Guzarti Chali Gayi"		3.55
3.	"Ek Duje Ke Vaaste"	Jubin Nautiyal
