= Lag Ja Gale =

Indian television series

- Genre: Drama; Romance
- Created by: Sandiip Sikcand
- Directed by: Khwaja Mughal
- Starring: Namik Paul; Tanisha Mehta
- Country of origin: India
- Original language: Hindi
- No. of seasons: 1
- No. of episodes: 95

Production
- Producers: Fazila Allana; Sandiip Sikcand
- Running time: 20-24 minutes
- Production companies: SOL Production; Sandiip Films

Original release
- Network: Zee TV; ZEE5
- Release: 7 February – 12 May 2023

Lag Ja Gale (transl. Embrace Me) is an Indian television series that premiered on 7 February 2023 on Zee TV. Produced by Fazila Allana and Sandiip Sikcand under SOL Production and Sandiip Films, it stars Namik Paul and Tanisha Mehta.

== Cast ==
=== Main ===
- Namik Paul as
  - Shiv Dhoopar: Kiran's elder son; Aniket, Tina and Yash's brother; Ishani's husband (2023)
  - Aniket Dhoopar: Kiran's second son; Shiv, Tina and Yash's brother; (2023) (Dead)
- Tanisha Mehta as Ishani Kulkarni: Sulochana and Jagdish's niece; Pooja, Neeti and Rachana's cousin; Aniket's love-interest; Shiv's wife (2023)

=== Recurring ===
==== Dhoopar family ====
- Neelam Pathania Abrol as Kiran Dhoopar: Bhupen's younger sister; Shiv, Yash, Tina and Aniket's mother (2023)
- Deepali Kamat as Shashi Dhoopar: Shiv, Aniket Tina and Yash's paternal aunt (2023)
- Aryan Arora as Yash Dhoopar: Kiran's younger son; Shiv, Aniket and Tina's brother; Pooja's husband (2023)
- Tanvi Shewale as Pooja Dhoopar: Sulochana and Jagdish's elder daughter; Neeti and Rachana's sister; Ishani's cousin; Yash's wife (2023)
- Neeva Malik as Dimpy: Meena and Bhupen's daughter; Shiv, Aniket, Yash and Tina's cousin; Randeep's wife (2023)
- Trishan Maini as Randeep: Dimpy's husband (2023)

==== Kulkarni family ====
- Snehal Reddy as Sulochana Kulkarni: Jagdish's wife; Pooja, Neeti and Rachana's mother; Ishani's aunt/foster mother (2023)
- Paritosh Pradhan as Jagdish Kulkarni: Sulochana's husband Pooja, Neeti and Rachana's father Ishani's foster father/uncle (2023)
- Riya Soni as Rachana Kulkarni: Sulochana and Jagdish's younger daughter; Pooja and Neeti's sister; Ishani's cousin (2023)
- Kumkum Parmar as Neeti Kulkarni: Sulochana and Jagdish's second daughter; Pooja and Rachana's sister; Ishani's cousin (2023)

==== Taneja family ====
- Sugandha Srivasta as Rohini Taneja: Rishi's wife; Bobby's mother (2023)
- Sandeep Sachdev as Rishi Taneja: Rohini's husband; Bobby's father (2023)
- Varsha as Tina Taneja: Kiran's daughter; Shiv Aniket and Yash's sister; Bobby's wife (2023)
- Aditya Deshmukh as Bobby Taneja: Tina's husband; Rohini and Rishi's son (2023)

==== Others ====
- Gagan Anand as Bhupen: Kiran's elder brother; Meena's husband Dimpy's father; Shiv, Aniket, Yash and Tina's maternal uncle; Aniket's murderer (2023)
- Priyamvada Singh as Meena: Bhupen's wife; Dimpy's mother; Shiv, Aniket, Yash and Tina's maternal aunt; Aniket's murderer (2023)
- Vishal Singh as Sooraj: Ishani's friend (2023)
- Sumit Wadhwa as Sumit: Aniket's murderer (2023)
- Avyan Tiwari as Party boy (2023)

== Production ==
=== Development ===
The show title is based on the song of the same name, from the 1964 film Woh Kaun Thi?. The series was announced on Zee TV by SOL Production.

=== Casting ===
Namik Paul was cast to portray the lead, Shiv Dhoopar. Tanisha Mehta was signed as the lead Ishani Kulkarni.

=== Release ===
The launch event for the series was held on 4 February 2023. It premiered on 7 February 2023 on ZEE TV. It ended on 12 May 2023 due to extremely low ratings. It's SOL Production's second flop show in a row.

== See also ==
- List of programmes broadcast by Zee TV
