= Donal Bisht =

Indian television actress

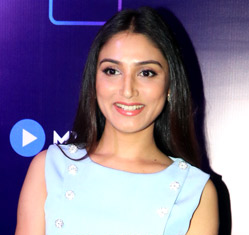
- Bisht in 2025
- Born: 27 August 1994 (age 32); Alwar, Rajasthan
- Occupations: Actress; model
- Years active: 2015–present
- Known for: Roop - Mard Ka Naya Swaroop; Bigg Boss 15

Donal Bisht (born 27 August 1994) is an Indian actress who mainly works in Hindi television. She is best known for her portrayal of Sharanya Bisht in Sony TV's drama series Ek Deewaana Tha and Ishika Patel in Colors TV's Roop - Mard Ka Naya Swaroop. In 2021, she participated in Bigg Boss 15. In 2019, Bisht ranked 18th in Times Most Desirable Women on TV.

== Early life ==
Donal was born on 27 August 1998 in Alwar, Rajasthan to Jaisingh Bisht and Jasumati Bisht, whereas her native place is Uttarakhand. She has an elder brother, Ranjan Bisht.

She worked as a journalist for the news channel, and was also an anchor for DD National's Chitrahaar.

== Career ==
=== Debut and early roles (2015–2017) ===
She made her acting debut in 2015 with Airlines as a journalist. In the same year, she played Dr. Shelly Gaitonde in anthology series Twist Wala Love alongside Harshith Arora.

From 2015 to 2017, she played Sakshi Deol Garewal in Kalash-Ek Vishwaas. It was her first major screen appearance. She also appeared as Priyanka in an episode of Aye Zindagi.

=== Breakthrough and success (2018–2020) ===
Bisht had her breakthrough with Ek Deewaana Tha where she portrayed Sharanya Bisht opposite Namik Paul and Vikram Singh Chauhan from 2017 to 2018. She played Radhika post the leap. The show ended in 2018. In 2018, she appeared as Riya in an episode of Laal Ishq alongside Mrunal Jain.

From 2018 to 2019, she portrayed Ishika Patel, a headstrong girl in Roop - Mard Ka Naya Swaroop opposite Shashank Vyas. In 2019, she replaced Jasmin Bhasin as Happy Mehra in Dil Toh Happy Hai Ji. She played the role opposite Ansh Bagri. The show ended the same year.

Bisht then made her web debut with Tia & Raj alongside Akshat Saluja. She played Tia and also produced the micro-web series. Then she portrayed Tamanna opposite Iqbal Khan. She also appeared in five music videos including 'Bepata', 'Alag Mera Yeh Rang Hain', 'Teri Patli Kamar', 'Betiyaan Pride of Nation' and 'Fukrapanti'.

=== Recent work and career expansion (2021–present) ===
She portrayed Sasha Pink in the web series The Socho Project yet to be released .

In October 2021, she participated in Bigg Boss 15 as a contestant. She was evicted on Day 18 by the housemates. In 2022, she appeared in music video 'Nikaah' with Afsana Khan.

Bisht is all set to make her Telugu and Kannada film debut with the bilingual Dare To Sleep where she will be seen opposite Chetan Kumar. She appeared alongside Gashmeer Mahajani in the Amazon MX & Prime web series Tu Zakhm Hai.

== In the media ==
In 2019, Bisht ranked 18th in Times Most Desirable Women on TV.

Bisht walked the ramp for Amit Talwar in 2019 in Delhi. The same year she walked the ramp for Anu Ranjan's "Be With Beti" campaign at Indian Television Academy Awards.

== Filmography ==
=== Television ===
Year	Title	Role	Notes	Ref.
2014	Chitrahaar	Host		
2015	Twist Wala Love	Dr. Shelly Gaitonde		
2015–2017	Kalash–Ek Vishwaas	Sakshi Deol Garewal		
2017–2018	Ek Deewaana Tha	Sharanya Bedi		
2018	Ek Deewaana Tha	Radhika Khurana		
2018	Laal Ishq	Riya	Episode: "Call Of The Night"	
2018–2019	Roop - Mard Ka Naya Swaroop	Ishika Patel Vaghela		
2019	Dil Toh Happy Hai Ji	Happy Mehra Saluja		
2021	Bigg Boss 15	Contestant	22nd place	

=== Films ===
Key
†	Denotes films that have not yet been released

Year	Title	Platform	Language	Notes	Ref.
TBA	Kumbhkarana / Dare To Sleep (DTS) †	TBA	Telugu, Kannada	Post-production	

=== Web ===
Year	Title	Role	Notes	Ref.
2020	Tia & Raj	Tia	Mini-series; Producer	
2021	Doon Kaand	Tamanna	Web series	
2021	The Socho Project	Sasha Pink	Musical series	
2022–2023	Tu Zakhm Hai	Kavya Garewal	2 seasons	

=== Music videos ===
Year	Title	Singer(s)	Ref.
2020	Bepata	Abhijit Vaghani	
2020	Alag Mera Yeh Rang Hain	Amruta Fadnavis	
2020	Teri Patli Kamar	Yash Wadali	
2020	Betiyaan Pride of Nation	Shreya Ghosal, Neeti Mohan, Amruta Fadnavis, Shalmali Kholgade, Palak Muchhal	
2020	Fukrapanti	Harmaan Najim, Swati Sharma	
2021	Kinni Vari	Rakesh Maini	
2022	Nikaah	Saajz, Naseebo Lal	
2023	Mana Leya Kar	Raghav Sachar	

== Awards and nominations ==
Year	Award	Category	Work	Result	Ref.
2018	Gold Awards	Best Jodi (with Namik Paul)	Ek Deewaana Tha	Nominated	
2019	Gold Awards	Most Fit Actor (Female)	—N/a	Nominated	

== See also ==
- List of Indian television actresses
- List of Hindi television actresses
