= Roop – Mard Ka Naya Swaroop =

Indian television drama

- Genre: Drama
- Created by: Rashmi Sharma
- Written by: Rashmi Sharma; Shanti Bhushan; Jyoti (Tandon) Sekhri
- Starring: Shashank Vyas; Donal Bisht
- Country of origin: India
- Original language: Hindi
- No. of seasons: 1
- No. of episodes: 253

Production
- Producer: Rashmi Sharma
- Camera setup: Multi-camera
- Running time: 20 minutes
- Production company: Rashmi Sharma Telefilms Limited

Original release
- Network: Colors TV
- Release: 28 May 2018 – 17 May 2019

Roop – Mard Ka Naya Swaroop (transl. Roop – New Form of Man) is an Indian television series that aired on Colors TV from 28 May 2018 to 17 May 2019. The series challenges stereotypes and aims to redefine the new age man, who doesn't consider being sensitive a sign of femininity. It stars Shashank Vyas and Donal Bisht.

== Plot ==
Roopendra "Roop" Singh Vaghela is an eight-year-old boy who deals with patriarchal norms of society. He likes cooking, washing and sewing the clothes which are considered female jobs by the orthodox society. Shamsher doesn't want Roop to stay with the women of the house so he decides to send Roop away to a military boarding school.

=== 15 years later ===
Roop returns home and decides to oppose Shamsher's misogynistic views. Roop meets Ishika Patel and falls in love with her. Ranveer, on the other hand, gets attracted to Ishika's beauty and wants to possess her. Roop ends up marrying Ishika while trying to save her from Ranveer. Ishika doesn't trust Roop at first, but later falls for him. Ranveer seeks revenge and kidnaps Ishika. Shamsher kills Ranveer while protecting Roop and Ishika.

Then Ranveer's brother comes to take revenge. Fai baa and Ranveer's brother Shambhu take revenge from shamsher. Shambhu is taken to jail and Shamsher is taken out from jail. Shamsher starts drinking a lot of alcohol and tries to succeed but Roopendra saves him. Roop's behaviour helps him to quit drinking.

== Cast and characters ==
=== Main ===
- Shashank Vyas as Roopendra "Roop" Singh Vaghela — Shamsher and Kamlesh's son; Mahesh and Kaushalya's nephew; Ranveer and Samru's cousin; Ishika's husband (2018–2019)
  - Affan Khan as young Roopendra (2018)
- Donal Bisht as Ishika Patel Singh Vaghela — Rupesh and Kanchan's daughter; Haren's niece; Dhaval, Praful and Purvi's cousin; Roopendra's wife (2018–2019)

=== Recurring ===
- Yash Tonk as Shamsher Singh Vaghela — Mahesh and Kaushalya's brother; Kamlesh's husband; Himani, Jigna, Kinjal and Roopendra's father (2018–2019)
- Mitali Nag as Kamlesh "Kamla" Kaushik Singh Vaghela — Manav's daughter; Shamsher's wife; Himani, Jigna, Kinjal and Roopendra's mother (2018–2019)
- Aanchal Khurana as Himani Singh Vaghela Suryavanshi — Shamher and Kamlesh's daughter; Jigna, Kinjal and Roopendra's sister; Mahesh and Kaushalya's niece; Ranveer and Samru's cousin; Himanshu's wife(2018–2019)
  - Nikki Sharma as young Himani (2018)
- Gaurav Sharma as Himanshu Suryavanshi — Himani's husband (2018–2019)
- Shubhanshi Singh Raghuvanshi as Jigna Singh Vaghela — Shamsher and Kamlesh's daughter; Himani, Kinjal and Roopendra's sister; Mahesh and Kaushalya's niece; Ranveer and Samru's cousin (2018–2019)
  - Ananya Agarwal as young Jigna (2018)
- Kritika Sharma as Kinjal Singh Vaghela — Shamsher and Kamlesh's daughter; Himani, Jigna and Roopendra's sister; Mahesh and Kaushalya's niece; Ranveer and Samru's cousin (2018–2019)
  - Tansheen Shah as young Kinjal (2018)
- Neil Bhatt as Ranveer Singh Vaghela — Mahesh's son; Samru's brother; Shamsher and Kaushalya's nephew; Himani, Jigna, Kinjal and Roopendra's cousin (2018–2019)
  - Ishant Bhanushali as young Ranveer (2018)
- Mohammad Nazim as Samru Singh Vaghela — Mahesh's son; Ranveer's brother; Shamsher and Kaushalya's nephew; Himani, Jigna, Kinjal and Roopendra's cousin (2019)
- Dharti Bhatt as Sewa – Roop's suitor (2019)
- Chandni Bhagwanani as Palak Goradia – Jeetu's daughter; Roop's childhood friend (2018–2019)
  - Pakhi Mendola as Young Palak (2018)
- Nikhil Sahni as Hardik (2018)
- Vaishali Thakkar as Kaushalya "Baisa" Singh Vaghela: Shamsher and Mahesh's sister (2018–2019)
- Swati Shah as Kanchan Patel – Rupesh's wife; Ishika's mother (2018–2019)
- Jagat Rawat as Rupesh Patel – Haren's brother; Kanchan's husband; Ishika's father (2018–2019)
- Sumati Singh as Purvi Patel – Haren and Sumitra's daughter; Dhaval and Praful's sister; Ishika's cousin (2018–19)
- Rahulram Manchanda as Dhaval Patel – Haren and Sumitra's son; Praful and Purvi's brother; Ishika's cousin; Romila's husband (2018–2019)
- Shraddha Jaiswal as Romila Patel – Dhaval's wife (2018–2019)
- Neha Narang as Vaishnavi Patel – Praful's wife (2018–2019)
- Mandar Jadhav as Praful Patel – Haren and Sumitra's son; Dhaval and Purvi's brother; Ishika's cousin; Vaishnavi's husband (2018–2019)
- Rasik Dave/Shakti Singh as Haren Patel – Rupesh's brother; Sumitra's husband; Dhaval, Praful and Purvi's father (2018–2019)
- Alpana Buch as Sumitra Patel – Haren's wife; Dhaval, Praful and Purvi's mother (2018–2019)
- Aashish Kaul as Jeetu Goradia – Shamsher's friend; Palak's father (2018)
- Falaq Naaz as Minal – Roop and Palak's school teacher (2018)
- Anil Dhawan as Manav Kaushik – Kamla's father; Roop, Himani, Jigna and Kinjal's grandfather (2018)
- Iti Kaurav as Vandana – Ishika's friend (2018)

=== Special appearances ===
- Hina Khan as Herself
- Sanjeeda Sheikh as Herself
