= Rocket Gang =

2022 Indian musical film

- Theatrical Release Poster
- Directed by: Bosco Martis
- Written by: Ravi Shankaran; Jasvinder Singh Bath
- Story by: Bosco Martis
- Starring: Aditya Seal; Nikita Dutta; Jason Tham; Mokshda Jaikhani; Sahaj Singh Chahal; Tejas Varma; Aadvik Mongia; Jayshree Gogoi; Dipali Borkar; Siddhant Sharma
- Cinematography: Sunil Patel
- Music by: Amit Trivedi
- Production company: Zee Studios
- Distributed by: Zee Studios
- Release date: 11 November 2022
- Running time: 139 minutes
- Country: India
- Language: Hindi

Rocket Gang is a 2022 Indian Hindi-language musical supernatural comedy film directed by Bosco Martis. Produced by Zee Studios, it stars Aditya Seal and Nikita Dutta.

== Plot ==
A group of young-adult friends arrives at Wonder-villa, a new resort, at night. Playing with a spirit board, they unwittingly summon the spirits of five children they had encountered earlier that day (not knowing that they were dead). The children, along with their dance coach, perished in a traffic accident caused by a car driven by Amarbir, one of the group members. Overwhelmed by guilt, the friends decide to allow the children to go to Dance India Dance (DID) and dance as they had wanted. The children want to perform one last dance for their mothers and agree to participate in the DID finals. However, the method they use to broadcast their performance to the world stops working. Heartbroken, the children fervently pray for one last opportunity to dance for their mothers. God answers their prayers, and with the support of their friends, they deliver a final performance. As the dance concludes, the children transform into golden butterflies and ascend to heaven, finding peace at last.

== Cast ==
- Aditya Seal as Amarbir
- Nikita Dutta as Tania
- Jason Tham as Bunnu
- Ranbir Kapoor as an angel (in the song "Har Bachcha Hai Rocket")
- Lucky Mehta as montu's mom
- Mokshda Jailkhani as Pia
- Sahaj Singh as Sahib
- Tejas Varma as JeJe
- Aadvik Mongia as Montu
- Jayshree Gogoi as Saher
- Dipali Borkar as Kiara
- Siddhant Sharma as Ganesh
- Sheersha Tiwari as Tanya's sister

== Production ==
=== Casting ===
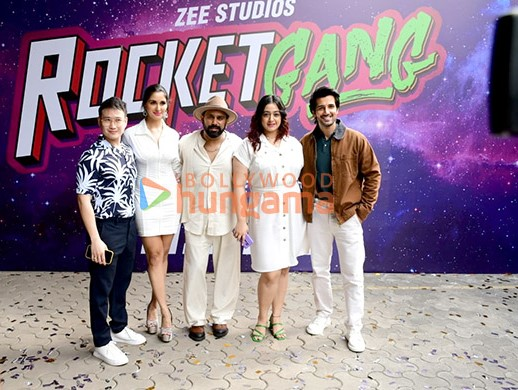
The cast of Rocket Gang

Bosco Martis was confirmed as director in May 2019 in his directorial debut. In September of that year, Aditya Seal was confirmed in the lead role. Nikita Dutta joined the cast as the female lead in August 2020.

=== Development ===
The film was announced by Zee Studios during the first week of August 2020, directed by Bosco Martis and starring Aditya Seal and Nikita Dutta. Principal photography was scheduled to begin in March 2020, but was postponed until December of that year due to the COVID-19 pandemic. Most scenes were shot in Mumbai and the Konkan, and filming wrapped up in September 2021.

=== Marketing ===
On 9 August 2020, a motion poster of the film's logo was released. Originally scheduled for release in 2021, Rocket Gang's release was postponed until the following year due to the COVID-19 pandemic. The film was released on 11 November 2022.

== Soundtrack ==
The film's music was composed by Amit Trivedi, with lyrics by Kshitij Patwardhan, Raftaar and Talha Siddiqui.

Track list
No.	Title	Lyrics	Singer(s)	Length
1.	"Udd Gaya Rocket"	Raftaar	Raftaar, Sharvi Yadav, Arhaan Hussain, Abhijeet Srivastava	2:50
2.	"Duniya Hai Maa Ki Godi Mein"	Kshitij Patwardhan	Meghna Mishra	3:22
3.	"Nachoge Toh Bachoge"	Talha Siddiqui	Anand Bhaskar, Sharvi Yadav, Talha Siddiqui	3:43
4.	"Hawaon Mein"	Kshitij Patwardhan	Neha Tawde, Abhijeet Srivastava	4:10
5.	"Trending Apni Yaari"	Kshijit Patwardhan	Shalmali Kholgade, Arun Kamath, Suhas Sawant, Raghav Chaitanya	3:29
6.	"Duniya Hai Maa Ki Godi Mein (dance mix)"	Kshitij Patwardhan	Rashi Harmalkar, Arhaan Hussain, Altamash Faridi	5:23
7.	"Har Bacha Hai Rocket"	Kshitij Patwardhan	Amit Trivedi	2:57
Total length:				25:46
