= Nishabd =

- Movie poster for Nishabd
- Directed by: Ram Gopal Verma
- Produced by: Ram Gopal Verma
- Starring: Amitabh Bachchan; Jiah Khan; Aftab Shivdasani; Revathi; Shraddha Arya; Rukhsar
- Cinematography: Amit Roy
- Edited by: Nipun Gupta, Amit Parmar
- Music by: Vishal Bhardwaj; Amar Mohile; Adnan Sami
- Release date: 2 March 2007
- Running time: 110 minutes
- Country: India
- Language: Hindi

Nishabd (pronounced [ˈnɪʃəbd]; transl. Speechless) is a 2007 Indian Hindi-language drama film directed by Ram Gopal Varma, starring Amitabh Bachchan and debutant Jiah Khan. The story of the film took inspiration from the 1999 American film American Beauty, and the 1986 Indian film Anokha Rishta.

== Plot ==
The film opens with young Ritu (Shradha Arya) bringing her friend Jia (Jiah Khan) to spend the holidays with her at her home in Kerala. Ritu's parents, Vijay Anand (Amitabh Bachchan) and Amrita (Revathi), have a beautiful home surrounded by picturesque surroundings. Vijay is a photographer, and Amrita is a homemaker.

Jia's mother lives alone in Australia (Jia's parents are divorced), and she studies in India. She is a free-spirited teenager with no attachments and no worries. She professes some affinity to Vijay, but it doesn't go much further than that. But Vijay's world is turned upside down when he takes pictures of Jia watering herself down with the garden hose. Something innocent grows into something bigger, and something bigger grows into something beyond control.

Jia's world collides with Vijay's, causing three casualties. Ritu witnesses Vijay and Jia kissing and tries to get Jia out of the house without revealing the truth to her mother but fails. Around this time, Amrita's brother Shridhar (Nassar) visits them. Through a sequence of events, he uncovers the disturbing truth about Jia and Vijay. Shridhar questions Vijay and realises that things are serious between Jia and him. Vijay confesses his love for Jia to Amrita, leaving her shattered.

Shridhar makes Vijay realise about Jia's vulnerable and naïve age, where even a small helping gesture can seem like love. Vijay understands and orders Jia to leave the house.

Both Ritu and Amrita lose their faith in Vijay. Ritu moves to America, and Vijay meets Shridhar again, the latter realising that Vijay is completely broken inside after his daughter and wife both lose trust in him. Vijay concludes that even though he often tries to commit suicide and is not scared of dying, he doesn't want to do so, as he wants to live a bit more in memories of Jia.

== Cast ==
- Amitabh Bachchan as Vijay Anand
- Jiah Khan as Jia
- Aftab Shivdasani as Rishi Khanna
- Revathi as Amritha Anand, Vijay's wife
- Nassar as Shridhar, Amritha's brother
- Shraddha Arya as Ritu Anand, Vijay's daughter

== Production ==
The film was shot in 20 days in Munnar, Kerala. The claim that it was inspired by Vladimir Nabokov's Lolita was denied by Amitabh Bachchan in the CNN IBN TV show Unspoken relationships - Nishabd special (3 March 2007).

== Awards and nominations ==
Khan was nominated for the Filmfare Award for Best Female Debut in 2007 for her performance in Nishabd.

== Soundtrack ==
Sl.No.	Song	Singer(s)	Lyricist	Composer	Length
1	"Rozaana"	Amitabh Bachchan	Munna Dhiman	Vishal Bhardwaj	06:16
2	"Take Lite"	Jiah Khan	Farhad-Sajid	Amar Mohile	04:30
3	"Kabhi Nahi - Remix (from Adnan Sami's Album - Tera Chehra)"	Adnan Sami, Feat: Amitabh Bachchan	Adnan Sami	Adnan Sami	03:39

== See also ==
- Joggers' Park
- Cheeni Kum
- American Beauty
- Anokha Rishta
