= Ehan Bhat =

Indian actor

- Born: 11 February 1992 (age 34); Srinagar, Jammu and Kashmir, India
- Occupation: Actor
- Years active: 2019–present

Ehan Bhat (born 11 February 1992) is an Indian actor, best known for his leading role in the film 99 Songs (2019), for which he won the Filmfare Award for Best Male Debut. He has since acted in the web series Broken But Beautiful (2021) and the film Starfish (2023).

== Filmography ==
=== Films ===
†	Denotes films that have not yet been released

Year	Title	Role	Notes	Ref.
2019	99 Songs	Jay		
2023	Starfish	Neil		
2024	Dange	Yuvaraj	Acted only in Hindi version	
2025	Dil Dosti Aur Dogs	Sunny		

=== Web series ===
Year	Title	Role	Notes	Ref.
2019	Broken But Beautiful	Ishan Rana	Season 3	

=== Music videos ===
Year	Title	Singer(s)	Ref.
2020	Bin Puche Ajana	Ami Mishra	
2020	First Kiss	Yo Yo Honey Singh, Ipsitaa	
2021	Chhor Denge	Parampara Thakur	
2022	Tera Mera Pyar 2.0	Yasser Desai, Josh Sahunta	

== Awards and nominations ==
Year	Award	Category	Work	Result	Ref.
2022	67th Filmfare Awards	Best Male Debut	99 Songs	Won	
