= Dream Girl – Ek Ladki Deewani Si =

Indian drama television series

- Also known as: Dream Girl
- Genre: Drama
- Created by: Sumeet Hukamchand Mittal; Shashi Mittal
- Directed by: Amit Gupta
- Starring: See below
- Theme music composer: Ritesh Rathore
- Country of origin: India
- Original language: Hindi
- No. of seasons: 1

Production
- Producers: Shashi Mittal; Sumeet Hukamchand Mittal
- Running time: 24 minutes
- Production company: Shashi Sumeet Productions

Original release
- Network: Life OK
- Release: 9 March 2015 – 4 March 2016

Dream Girl – Ek Ladki Deewani Si is an Indian television drama series, which premiered on Life OK. The show was produced by Shashi Mittal and Sumeet Mittal, under Shashi Sumeet Mittal Productions. It stars Shraddha Arya and Nikita Dutta, Mohsin Khan and Sudeep Sahir, Kunal Verma and Khalid Siddiqui. The show went off air on 4 March 2016.

== Plot ==
Navrang Studios is owned by Sareens, a prestigious film family of Mumbai. Lakshmi Mathur, an aspiring Jodhpur based Dream girl visits Mumbai to fulfil her dreams and falls in love with Sareen family's younger son, Samar.

Samar's cunning and ambitious older sister-in-law, Ayesha Roy is overprotective of her power and title, wanting to be irreplaceable and India's only Dream girl. However, Lakshmi has a talent and spark like her to become a Dream girl.

Lakshmi tries to prove her skills, angering Ayesha; who finds out that Samar and Lakshmi love each other. Lakshmi passes all the challenges thrown by Ayesha; making her insecure. Ayesha misleads her brother, Karan (who has feelings for Lakshmi) that Lakshmi loves him.

Eventually, Ayesha transfers all property rights of Navarang to her name and succeeds. Lakshmi and Samar get married. The property is set on fire; Samar's older brother, Manav (Ayesha's husband) and Karan are sent to extinguish the fire.

Samar and Manav (supposedly) die; due to a car crash. Samar's body is recovered; Manav's body isn't found. The Sareens find out Ayesha's "dark secret"; who in fact is her twin sister, Aarti. They use Aarti (who willingly helps) to fight back against Ayesha for their studio (Navarang) Aarti impersonates Ayesha and tells all the investors that she will pay all their money along with interest to them.

There is a new entry in the show, Raghu. The story progresses and shows Ayesha trying to impress Raghu (similar to season 1 where a poor character, named Lakshmi, played by Shraddha Arya) dreams of marrying a rich and wealthy businessman named Arjun Agnihotri (played by Sudeep Sahir).

Aarti tries to get Navrang back to its former glory. Ayesha marries Raghu by deceiving everyone, pretending to be Aarti as Aarti and Raghu fall in love after many meetings where Raghu thinks that Aarti is Ayesha and then he finds out that it is Aarti instead. Aarti's face is burned and no one can tell which one is Ayesha or Aarti.

Aarti is planning to take revenge on Ayesha. Ayesha has always caused Aarti pain and harm, yet Aarti kept forgiving her. Now Aarti has a new face (Megha Gupta) and she appears as a strong character and fights against Aarti (who in reality is Ayesha) to reveal her truth to everyone.

After a few upturns and twists, Ayesha's truth is revealed to everyone by Aarti as "Shikha" and Raghu (who helped Aarti with her face transplant and advice) but Ayesha cunningly starts pretending as if she has lost her 4-5 year's memory and as a result; the police can not arrest her; until her recovery. So, she is allowed to stay in the Sareen House; until she remembers everything. In the meanwhile, Aarti and Raghu get married, and soon have a baby girl.

Ayesha has her own intentions and as she gets the opportunity, she steals Aarti and Raghu's daughter, and escapes with the child, leaving her career, stardom and dreamgirl title (which were by then ruined; due to her misdeeds) for one single motive - to make the baby girl her own daughter and to train her to become the next "Dream Girl".

== Cast ==
=== Main ===
- Shraddha Arya as
  - Ayesha Roy Sareen: Aarti's twin and Karan's elder sister; Manav's wife; Raghu's ex-wife (2015–2016)
  - Aarti Roy (before plastic surgery): Ayesha's twin and Karan's elder sister (2015)
- Megha Gupta as Aarti Roy Rastogi (after plastic surgery): Ayesha's twin and Karan's elder sister; Raghu's second wife (2015–2016)
- Nikita Dutta as Lakshmi Mathur Sareen: Samar's widow; Karan's love-interest; Rishi Mathur's daughter (2015–2016)
- Mohsin Khan as Samar Sareen: Manav's younger brother; Lakshmi's husband (2015)
- Khalid Siddiqui as Manav Sareen - Samar's elder brother; Ayesha's first husband (2015-2016)
- Kunal Verma as Karan Roy: Ayesha and Aarti's younger brother; Lakshmi's one-sided lover (2015–2016)
- Sudeep Sahir as Raghav "Raghu" Rastogi - Ayesha's ex-husband; Aarti's husband (2015–2016)

=== Recurring characters ===
- Alina Kumar as Tanya (2015-2016)
- Purvi Mundada as Richa (2016)
- Virendra Singh as Rishi Mathur: Lakshmi's father
- Aparna Kumar as Nandini Thakur (2015)
- Chaitanya Choudhury as Abhimanyu (2015)
- Rukhsar Rehman as Amrita (2015)
- Geeta Tyagi as Shanti Mathur/Bua Ji: Lakshmi's aunt and Rishi Mathur's sister (2015-2016)
- Unknown as Kushal

=== Special appearances ===
- Kriti Sanon as Heera
- Rakul Preet Singh as Priya
- R. K. Suresh as Suresh
- Sivakarthikeyan as Vijay

== Production and casting ==
The series is set in Jodhpur and Mumbai. The show is produced by Shashi Mittal and Sumeet Mittal under their own Shashi-Sumeet Productions.

Shraddha Arya and Nikita Dutta play the female leads while Mohsin Khan plays the male lead role of Samar.
