= Vaishali Sarwankar =

Indian film producer

- Born: Maharashtra, India
- Education: NMIMS
- Occupation: Film producer

Vaishali Sarwankar is an Indian film producer.

== Early life ==
Vaishali was born into a Maharashtrian family and grew up in a society where education for women was frowned upon and involvement in a business was forbidden. She completed her schooling in Mumbai and studied MBA at NMIMS.

Vaishali was the head of international trades in the Atlantic group. She was roped in as the CEO of Carnival Motion Pictures in 2020, a film production house in Mumbai, Maharashtra. Her films as a producer include Thackeray and Sachin: A Billion Dreams. Rohit Vats of Hindustan Times stated "Sachin A Billion Dreams does really well in bringing out the relationship between Sachin and his father and how he couldn’t deal with the loss for a long time and how he wanted to make him proud even after his death during the 1999 World Cup."

She has also produced Mere Desh Ki Dharti, which is a patriotic drama starring Divyenndu and Anupriya Goenka in lead roles.

== Awards ==
- Shiv Gaurav Award
