= Sumit Mishra =

Indian filmmaker, art director and painter

- Born: Bihar, India
- Occupations: Filmmaker, Art Director and Painter
- Years active: 2006 - 2024
- Website: www.iamsumitmishra.com

Sumit Mishra is an Indian filmmaker, art director and painter. He is most known for his credits in projects like Khidki, Agam, Ahista Ahista, Naagin 3 and Madhubala. He is also the director and founder of Manikarnika International Film Festival.

== Biography ==
Mishra belongs to Bihar, India. Mishra is an alumnus of Banaras Hindu University.

=== As a director ===
He made his directing debut in 2016 with the film Amrita and I. In 2020, he directed the film Khidki. In 2022, he contributed to the film Agam. He also directed the film Banaras Vanilla.

=== As an art director ===
He made his debut as an art director in the year 2006 with the film Ahista Ahista. His noted projects as an art director including: Alif, Naagin-3, Madhubala, Nakkash, Wake Up India, among others.

=== As a painter ===
He is also a professional painter. His paintings got featured in various noted art galleries including: AIFACS, Jehangir Art Gallery, Bajaj Art Gallery, Nehru Centre, among others.

== Filmography ==
=== As a director ===
Year	Movie	Notes	Refs.
2016	Amrita and I		
2020	Khidki		
2021	Banaras Vanilla		
2022	Agam		

=== As an art director ===
Year	Movie	Notes	Refs.
2006	Ahista Ahista	Debut movie	
2010	Abhilasha		
2010	A Flat		
2013	Rangrasiya		
2014	Manjunath		
2016	Adha Full		
2016	Alif		
2018	Krishna Chali London		
2019	Karrle Tu Bhi Mohabbat		
2019	Nakkash		

=== Painting work ===
- Kitaab - AIFACS, Bajaj Art Gallery
- Abhivyakti - Jehangir Art Gallery
- Vimarsh - Nehru Centre
