= Ravi Sah =

Indian film actor

- Born: Kasba,Purnia, Bihar
- Occupation: Film Actor

Ravi Sah also known as Ravi Bhushan Bhartiya is an Indian actor. He is a graduate of the Film and Television Institute of India (FTII) and he is most known for his role as Balram Singh in Paan Singh Tomar.

== Early life ==
Ravi Sah was born and brought up in Purnia, Bihar. He is educated at the Jawahar Navodaya Vidyalaya, Purnia. He has done his graduation in journalism from Makhan Lal Chaturvedi Journalism Institute, Bhopal. He is a graduate of the Film and Television Institute of India (FTII), Pune.

== Film career ==
Ravi started his acting journey as a theatre artist. He worked in theatre for more than 5 years with Ram Gopal Bajaj, Late Habib Tanveer, Alok Chatterjee & Late Alakhnandan. Have been associated with Indian People's Theatre Association (IPTA).

== Filmography ==
Key
†	Denotes films that have not yet been released

- All films are in Hindi unless otherwise noted.

=== Films ===
Year	Title	Role	Notes
2010	Soch Lo	Shabbie Cop	Debut Hindi film
2011	Force	Dharmesh	
2012	Paan Singh Tomar	Balram Singh Tomar	
2012	Filmistaan	Haafiz	
2012	Dabangg 2	Shrey	
2015	Partu	Behru Singh	Debut Marathi film
2018	Phamous	Rajendra	
2018	Life of an Outcast	Schoolteacher's Father	
2019	Nakkash	Sub Inspector	
2020	Raat Akeli Hai	Keval / Truck Driver	

=== Web series ===
Year	Title	Role	Notes
2020	Jamtara: Sabka Number Ayega	Mahesh	Netflix
2020	Crime Next Door	Inspector Shekhawat	Disney+ Hotstar (Lead Role)
