= Pawan Tiwari =

Indian actor and film producer

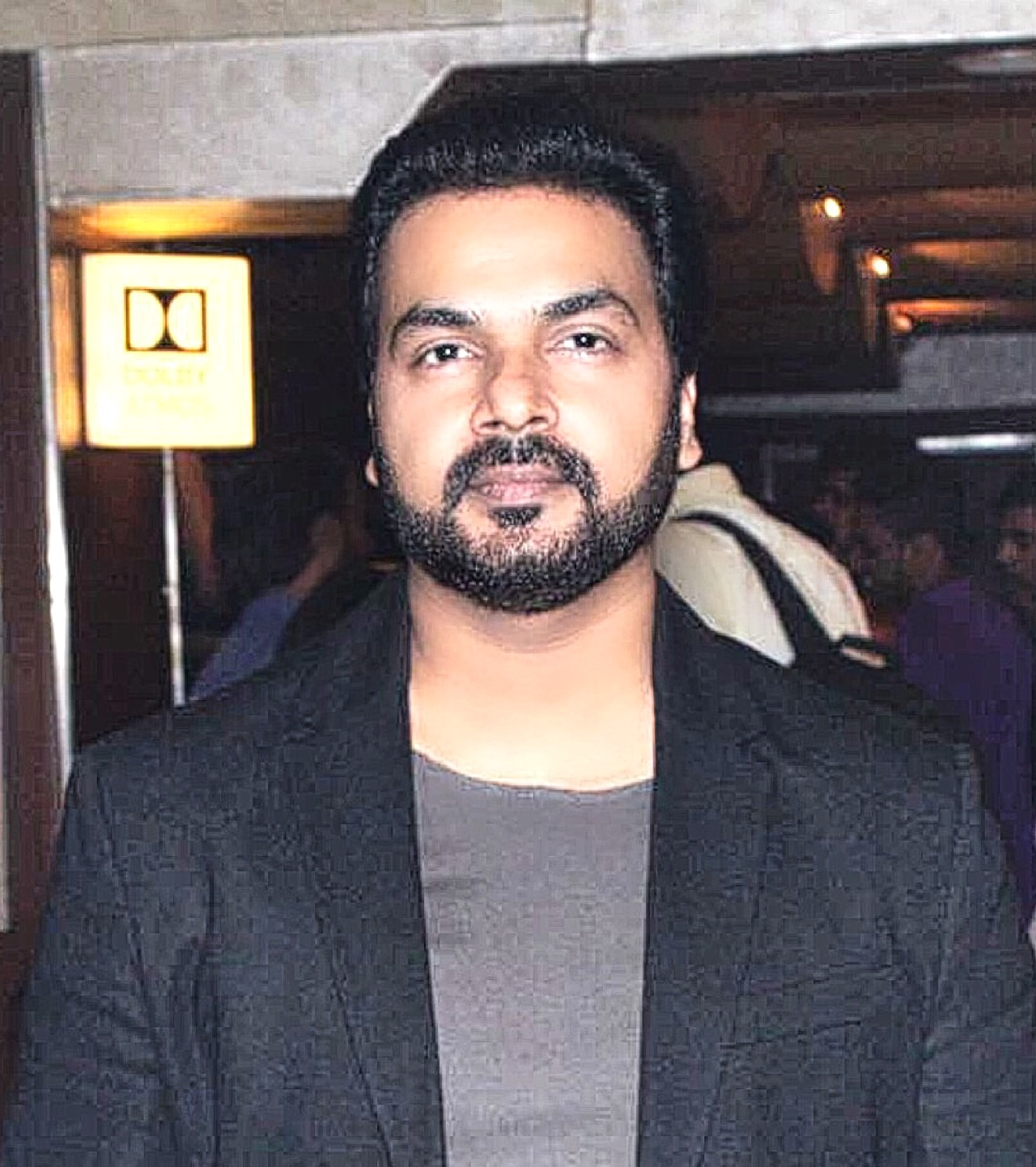
- Pawan Tiwari
- Born: Jamuni, Siddharthnagar district, Uttar Pradesh, India
- Citizenship: Indian
- Occupations: Actor, film producer
- Years active: 2004–present
- Organization: Jalsa Pictures
- Father: Brij Bhushan Tiwari
- Relatives: Alok Tiwari (brother)

Pawan Tiwari is an Indian actor and film producer associated with Hindi television and independent cinema. He is best known for producing films such as Dozakh in Search of Heaven, Alif, and Nakkash under his production company Jalsa Pictures. He has also appeared in several television serials including Do Dil Ek Jaan, Piya Ka Ghar Pyaara Lage, Haunted Nights, and CID.

== Career ==
Tiwari started his acting career with television serials and became known through shows such as Do Dil Ek Jaan on Life OK, where he played the role of Arshad. He later appeared in serials including Piya Ka Ghar Pyaara Lage, Haunted Nights, Kismat Connection, CID, and Black.

He made his film appearance in Pranali (2008). He later turned producer with the feature film Dozakh in Search of Heaven, which also featured him as an actor. The film gained attention after appreciation from actor Amitabh Bachchan. Under his production banner Jalsa Pictures, he later produced Alif and Nakkash, both of which received critical appreciation for their socially relevant themes.

== Filmography ==
=== Films ===
Films
Year	Title	Role	Notes
2008	Pranali	Sultan's lawyer	
2013	Dozakh in Search of Heaven	Auto driver	Actor and producer
2017	Alif	LIU Officer	Actor and producer
2019	Nakkash	Munna Bhaiya	Actor and producer

=== Television ===
Television
Title	Role	Channel
Do Dil Ek Jaan	Arshad	Life OK
Piya Ka Ghar Pyaara Lage	Prakash	Sahara One
CID		Sony TV
Haunted Nights		Sahara One
Kismat Connection		Sahara One
Black		9X
