= Chuha Billi =

2021 Indian short film

Chuha Billi is a 2021 Indian thriller short film, written by Mehak Mirza Prabhu and directed by Prasad Kadam with Adah Sharma and Anupriya Goenka playing the lead roles.

== Plot ==
The film revolves around a young woman named Kats, played by Adah Sharma. So basically the character 'cat' here is little disturbed mentally. She was going through eating disorder. And along with that she was suffering from panic attacks, sudden mood swings, which we can see in between the film, when she suddenly laughs and the next time becomes gloomy. As she was ill mentally, the character 'rat' was with her to take care of her. She was the only one who could understand 'cat' and was helping her to get over those issues. But one day 'cat' got to know that, her only support is also secretly planning to leave her. She was hurt, and didn't want to let her go. So she gave 'rat' poison and she also ate it, so that 'rat' can't leave her and both died together in the end.

== Cast ==
- Adah Sharma
- Anupriya Goenka

== Awards and nominations ==
- Filmfare short film awards 2022
