= Sharib Hashmi =

Indian actor (born 1976)

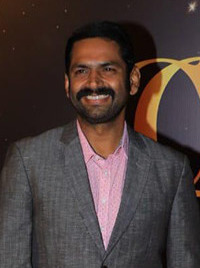
- Sharib in 2019
- Born: 25 January 1976 (age 50); Bombay, Maharashtra, India
- Occupations: Actor; writer; producer; director
- Years active: 1999–present
- Spouse: Nasreen Hashmi (m. 2003)
- Children: 2

Sharib Hashmi (born 25 January 1976) is an Indian actor, writer, producer and director who works in the Hindi cinema. He is best known for portraying J. K. Talpade in the Amazon Prime Video series The Family Man (2019-2025) for which he won several awards including a Filmfare OTT Award for Best Supporting Actor in a Drama Series.

== Early life and education ==
Sharib Hashmi was born in Malad, Mumbai, into a middle-class family. His father, Z. A. Johar, was a noted film journalist. Sharib did his schooling from St. John's Model English High School and graduated from Bhavan's College in Mumbai, India.

== Personal life ==
Sharib married Nasreen Hashmi on 27 December 2003. The couple have 2 children, a girl and a boy.

== Career ==
Sharib worked behind the scenes in MTV Roadies Season 2. In 2008, he appeared in Slumdog Millionaire, which became an Oscar-winning movie.

In 2012, he obtained a major role in Filmistaan, alongside Inaamulhaq and Kumud Mishra. He played a supporting role in Jab Tak Hai Jaan, which starred Shahrukh Khan, Anushka Sharma and Katrina Kaif.

Later, he worked on films like Badmashiyaan (2015), Phullu Phullu (2017), Vodka Diaries (2018), Batti GUI Meter Chalu (2018), Nakkash (2019), Ujda Chaman (2019), Darbaan (2020) and Vikram Vedha (2022).

Sharib Hashmi's other work has included the Amazon Prime production Blockbuster Series The Family Man and Voot Select blockbuster Asur.

In 2020, he appeared in the television series A Viral Wedding, Scam 1992, and worked in numerous commercials, television web series and films.

== Filmography ==
Key
†	Denotes films that have not yet been released

=== Films ===
Year	Title	Role	Notes	Ref.
2008	Slumdog Millionaire	Prakash	English film	
2008	Haal-e-Dil	Viju		
2012	Jab Tak Hai Jaan	Zain		
2012	Filmistaan	Sunny		
2015	Badmashiyaan	Jassi Chaudhary		
2017	Phullu	Phullu		
2018	Batti Gul Meter Chalu	Vikas		
2018	Vodka Diaries	Sr Inspector Ankit Dayal		
2019	Nakkash	Samad		
2019	Fastey Fasaatey	Mayank		
2019	Ujda Chaman	Raj Kumar		
2020	Gul Makai	Ataullah Khan		
2020	My Client’s Wife	Manas Verma		
2020	Darbaan	Raicharan	Released on Zee5	
2020	Ram Singh Charlie	Raghunath	Released on Sony LIV	
2020	Bishwa			
2020	Mrs & Mr Khurana	Manav Khurana		
2021	Pagglait	B. K. Arora	Released on Netflix	
2021	Helmet	Bunty Bhai	Released on ZEE5	
2022	Dhaakad	Fazal		
2022	Vikram Vedha	Babloo		
2023	Mission Majnu	Aslam Usmaniya	Released on Netflix	
2023	Zara Hatke Zara Bachke	Daroga Raghuvanshi		
2023	Shiv Shastri Balboa	Sinmohan Singh		
2023	Tarla	Nalin Dalal	Released on Zee5	
2024	Fighter	Varthaman		
2024	Malhar	Mohan		
2024	Sharmajee Ki Beti	Sudhir Sharma	Amazon Prime film	
2025	Sangee	Baman		
2025	The Diplomat	Tiwari		
2025	Murderbaad	Maqsood Ghaziabadi		
2025	Ufff Yeh Siyapaa	Gungra		
2025	Gustaakh Ishq	Bhoore		
2026	Happy Patel: Khatarnak Jasoos	Geet		
2026	Haiwaan	Ashok Shinde		
TBA	Cancer †		Pre-production	

=== Other credits ===
Year	Film	Notes & Ref.
As Writer
2000-2006	MTV Bakra	Television show
2018	Mitron	Dialogues
2019	Notebook	Dialogues
2020	Ram Singh Charlie	
As Producer
2020	Ram Singh Charlie	Released on Sony LIV
As Director
1999	Hum Tum Pe Marte Hain	Worked as an Art Director

=== Short films ===
Year	Title	Role	Ref.
2014	Mehrooni	Mr. Sharma	
2015	Ludo of a Dice and a Decision	Taxi Driver 1	
2015	Finding Home	Javed Ali	
2018	Within	Avi	
2018	Dhund	Harmeet	
2020	Soch	Father	
2020	Kala Bai from Byculla	Aniket	

=== Television ===
Year	Title	Role	Platform	Notes	Ref.
2003-2006	MTV Bakra	Various Characters	MTV		
2011	Best Of Luck Nikki	Partha sir	Disney	Cameo; 1 episode	
2016	Sex Chat with Pappu & Papa	Nikhil	YouTube		
2019–Present	The Family Man	Jayavant Kashinath "JK" Talpade	Amazon Prime Video		
2020	Asur	Lolark Dubey	Voot		
2020	A Viral Wedding	Ujjwal Pujari aka UP	Eros Now		
2020	Scam 1992	Sharad Bellary	Sony Liv		
2022	The Great Indian Murder	Ashok Rajput	Disney+ Hotstar		
2024	36 Days	Vinod Shinde	Sony Liv		
2024	Khoj - Parchaiyo Ke Uss Paar	Ved	ZEE5		

== Awards and nominations ==
Year	Award	Category	Work	Result	Ref.
2014	Stardust Awards	Best Actor	Filmistaan	Nominated	
2015	IIFA Awards	Best Performance in a Comic Role	Filmistaan	Nominated	
2015	Screen Awards	Best Comedian	Filmistaan	Won	
2015	Star Guild Awards	Best Male Debut	Filmistaan	Nominated	
2020	Filmfare OTT Awards	Best Supporting Actor in a Drama Series	Asur	Nominated	
2021	Filmfare OTT Awards	Best Supporting Actor in a Drama Series	The Family Man Season 2	Won	
2023	Filmfare OTT Awards	Best Supporting Actor in a Wb Original Film	Tarla	Nominated	
