= Sonali Sachdev =

Indian actress

- Born: Sonali Mahimtura; Mumbai, Maharashtra, India
- Occupations: Dentist, Actress
- Spouse: Hemant Sachdev

Sonali Sachdev (née Mahimtura) is an Indian actress. She is well known for portraying gynecologist Dr. Shilpa Thakkar in the super-hit Star Plus TV series Baa Bahoo Aur Baby. She has worked in multiple Indian TV shows and Bollywood films. She has been recently seen in Indian Hindi-language medical drama streaming television series on Amazon Prime Video web series Mumbai Diaries 26/11 as Shamita Parekh.

== Early life ==
Sonali is of Gujarati descent through her father's side. She is a qualified dentist who later decided to pursue her dream of becoming an actress.

== Filmography ==
=== Films ===
- 2018 – Kedarnath as Mukku's Mother
- 2014 – Pizza
- 2007 – Taare Zameen Par as Irene (School Teacher)
- 2012 – Mere Dost Picture Abhi Baki Hai
- 2013 – Labours Of (An)Other Solipsist as Alice
- 2012 – Rizwan (Short) as Ammi
- 2010 – Aashayein as Doctor
- 2009 – Aamras: The Sweet Taste of Friendship as Mrs. Sehgal (as Sonali)
- 2009 – Wishes (2009 film)
- 2021 – Mumbai Diaries 26/11 as Shamitha Parekh
- 2024 – Kahan Shuru Kahan Khatam

=== Television ===
Year(s)	Show	Role	Notes
2005–2010	Baa Bahoo Aur Baby	Dr. Shilpa Thakkar	Supporting role
2009–2010	Kya Mast Hai Life	Sandra D'Souza	Supporting role
2013–2014	Sanskaar – Dharohar Apnon Ki	Parul Karsan Vaishav	Nominated—Indian Telly Award for Best Actress in a Supporting Role (2013)
2014–2016	Satrangi Sasural	Narmada Vatsal	
2019	Made in Heaven	Mrs. Yadav	
2020	A Viral Wedding	Neena Ahuja	
2023	Potluck (Indian web series)	Sushma	Nidhi's Mother, Supporting role
2025	Andhera (TV series)	Sarita Sheth	
