= A Viral Wedding =

2020 Indian miniseries

- Genre: Romance, Comedy, Drama
- Written by: Shreya Dhanwanthary
- Story by: Shreya Dhanwanthary
- Directed by: Shreya Dhanwanthary
- Presented by: Eros Now
- Starring: Shreya Dhanwanthary; Amol Parashar; Mohit Raina; Sonali Sachdev; Sharib Hashmi
- Country of origin: India
- Original language: Hindi
- No. of seasons: 1
- No. of episodes: 8

Production
- Producers: Shreya Dhanwanthary; Pratha Narang Naik
- Editor: Mahesh Bhojwani
- Running time: 8-10 minutes
- Production companies: Eros Motion Pictures; A D2R Indie

Original release
- Network: Eros Now
- Release: 9 May 2020

A Viral Wedding is a 2020 Indian Miniseries of 8 episodes produced by A D2R Indie and Eros Motion Pictures. It is featured as an Eros Now Quickie and is available for streaming at Eros Now. The web series is written and directed by Shreya Dhanwanthary, who is also the main lead in the series. The entire series was shot during the lockdown with the actors and the crew staying indoors at their respective homes. The micro-series also stars Amol Parashar, Mohit Raina, Sonali Sachdev and Sharib Hashmi.

== Plot ==
Nisha and Rishabh had planned the perfect wedding, but the coronavirus lockdown may require a change of plans.

== Cast ==
- Shreya Dhanwanthary as Nisha Ahuja
- Amol Parashar as Rishabh Sinha
- Mohit Raina as Yudhisthir Kaul aka Yudi
- Sonali Sachdev as Neena Ahuja
- Sunny Hinduja as Nishant Ahuja
- Aritro Banerjee as Imtiyaz Baig
- Aishwarya Choudhary as Aditi Jha
- Sharib Hashmi as Ujjwal Pujari aka UP

== Reception ==
Film critic Rajeev Masand in his video said, "It was only a matter of time, and it was always going to be about who did it first." National Herald India mentioned, “A Viral Wedding is a light-hearted attempt to bring smiles to people’s faces during this time of social distancing.”
