= War Chhod Na Yaar =

- Film poster
- Directed by: Faraz Haider
- Written by: Faraz Haider; Deepak Kingrani
- Starring: Sharman Joshi; Soha Ali Khan; Javed Jaffrey; Sanjai Mishra; Mukul Dev; Dalip Tahil
- Cinematography: Sejal Shah
- Music by: Aslam Keyi
- Production company: AOPL Entertainment
- Release date: 11 October 2013
- Country: India
- Language: Hindi
- Budget: ₹140 million

War Chhod Na Yaar (transl. Quit the war, dude) is a 2013 Indian Hindi-language war comedy film that was directed and written by Faraz Haider, with dialogue written by Deepak Kingrani. The film was announced on 30 March 2013 with a launch party at the Novotel Hotel in the presence of the lead actors, Sharman Joshi, Soha Ali Khan, Javed Jaffery, Sanjai Mishra, Dalip Tahil, and Mukul Dev.

The movie was produced by AOPL Entertainment Pvt Ltd and was released on 11 October 2013.

== Plot ==
Captains Rajveer Singh Rana (Sharman Joshi) and Qureshi (Javed Jaffrey), who are military captains of India and Pakistan, respectively, are playing cards with their partners at the India-Pakistan border when a bomb explodes. Seventeen hours before, the Defence Minister of India called reporter Ruth Dutta (Soha Ali Khan) to talk about some top secret information and says after two days, war will be declared between India and Pakistan. Fourteen hours before the explosion, the Defence Minister of Pakistan and the Pakistani General contacted the Defence Minister of China for some help. The Defence Minister of China says he will attack New Delhi with a nuclear bomb. At the India-Pakistan border, the Pakistani army is becoming very lazy; the troops ignore commander Khan (Sanjay Mishra). On the battlefield, Captains Singh and Quereshi and their troops form a friendship and camaraderie based on a love of conversations and playing antakshari, a game of Hindi film songs and foods. Ruth Dutta, a television news reporter, arrives to make a documentary about the lives of the soldiers on the two sides. When war between the two countries is declared, the friendship between the two sides is tested and conspiracy theories are hatched.

== Cast ==
- Sharman Joshi as Captain Rajveer Singh Rana (Raj) of the Indian Army
- Soha Ali Khan as Ruth Dutta, reporter of GBC news
- Javed Jaffrey as Captain Qureshi of the Pakistan Army
- Dalip Tahil as Defence Minister of India/Pakistan and China/Mr. Shawn, United States Secretary of Defence
- Mukul Dev as Ghuspetia
- Sanjay Mishra as Commander Khan of Pakistan Army
- Ram Awana as member of Pakistani team
- Vivek Rana as Lt. Sahil Khatri
- Avantika Khatri as Sakshi
- Manoj Pahwa as Pakistani General
- Badrul Islam as Gaderya

== Soundtrack ==
War Chhod Na Yaar

Soundtrack album by Aslam Keyi
- Released: 23 September 2013
- Genre: Film soundtrack
- Length: 1:09:53
- Labels: Super Cassettes Industries Limited; AOPL Entertainment
- Producer: Aslam Keyi

Aslam Keyi chronology
The Unsound (2013)	War Chhod Na Yaar (2013)	Chehra (2013)

The Soundtrack of the film was released on 23 September 2013 along with its trailer with music composed by Aslam Keyi and lyrics by Bebak Amrohi, Azeem Shirazi & Faraz Haider.

Track listing
No.	Title	Lyrics	Singer(s)	Length
1.	"War Chhod Na Yaar"	Faraz Haider & Bebak Amrohi	Candy DZouza, Bappi Lahiri & Rimi Dhar	4:42
2.	"Main Jagoon Aksar"	Azeem Shirazi	Ali Aslam, Javed Ali & Shreya Ghoshal	5:50
3.	"Phat Gaya"	Faraz Haider	Daler Mehndi	5:35
4.	"Mharo Desh Mahaan"	Bebak Amrohi	Kailash Kher	5:47
5.	"Khwabon Si Jo"	Azeem Shirazi	Naresh Iyer	6:16
6.	"Jai Jawan"	Faraz Haider	Sukhwinder Singh	5:22
7.	"Kurban"	Bebak Amrohi	Javed Khan & Sonu Nigam	5:05
8.	"Fauji"	Faraz Haider & Rap: Luv o'trigger	Mika Singh, Brijesh Shandaliya, Luv O Trigger & Marianne D'Cruz Aiman	4:42
9.	"Ishq Mein"	Azeem Shirazi	Tripti Sinha, Vardan, Divya Kumar & Deepali Sathe	4:34
10.	"Main Jaagun Aksar"	Azeem Shirazi	Shujath Ali Khan, Ali Aslam & Shreya Ghoshal	5:50
11.	"Mharo Desh Mahaan (Ethnic Mix)"	Bebak Amrohi	Kailash Kher	5:47
12.	"Khwabon Si Jo"	Azeem Shirazi	Ali Azmat & Sujith Kumar	6:07
13.	"Fauji (Club Mix)"	yo yo honey singh	Mika Singh	4:16
Total length:				1:09:53

== Earning ==
The movie performed average on the box office it was made on a budget of Rs 14 crore. Released in 754 screens in India, the movie also hit screens in some parts of the Middle East and Malaysia.
