= The Narmada Story =

2026 Indian crime thriller film

- Directed by: Zaigham Imam
- Story by: Zaigham Imam
- Produced by: AB Infosoft Creation
- Starring: Raghubir Yadav; Mukesh Tiwari; Ashwini Kalsekar; Simala Prasad; Anjali Patil; Zarina Wahab; Ishtiyak Khan
- Music by: Manik Batra
- Production companies: AB Infosoft Creation; Golden Ratio Films
- Release date: 12 June 2026
- Country: India
- Language: Hindi

The Narmada Story is a 2026 Indian Hindi-language crime thriller film directed by Zaigham Imam and produced by AB Infosoft Creation. The film stars Raghubir Yadav, Mukesh Tiwari, Ashwini Kalsekar, Simala Prasad, Anjali Patil, Zarina Wahab and Ishtiyak Khan.

The film is set in Madhya Pradesh and centres on themes of crime, justice, women's empowerment and the lives of tribal communities.

== Premise ==
The story follows a tribal woman whose family becomes the target of criminal elements in rural Madhya Pradesh. Her struggle for justice intersects with the investigation of Narmada Raikwar, a police officer working against organised crime and corruption in the region.

== Cast ==
- Raghubir Yadav as Nandkishore Raikwar
- Mukesh Tiwari as Ram Ratan Shukla
- Ashwini Kalsekar as Agni Dhurve
- Simala Prasad as Narmada Raikwar
- Anjali Patil as Gulab Singh
- Zarina Wahab as Sudha Raikwar
- Ishtiyak Khan
- Sadanand Patil
