= Dozakh in Search of Heaven =

Dozakh in Search Of Heaven
- Dozakh's Primary Poster
- Directed by: Zaigham Imam
- Written by: Zaigham Imam
- Based on: Dozakh in Search of Heaven by Zaigham Imam
- Produced by: Zaigham Imam; Pawan Tiwari
- Starring: Lalit Mohan Tiwari; Pawan Tiwari
- Cinematography: Mailesan Rangaswamy
- Edited by: Prakash Jha
- Music by: Aman Pant
- Production companies: AB Infosoft; JALSA Pictures
- Release dates: 12 November 2013 (Kolkata International Film Festival); 20 March 2015
- Country: India
- Languages: Hindi; Urdu

Dozakh in Search of Heaven (lit. 'Hell in Search of Heaven') is a 2013 Indian film written and directed by Zaigham Imam, which premiered at the Kolkata International Film Festival on 12 November 2013. It was jointly produced by Imam and Pawan Tiwari who also acts in the film. It is an adaptation of a book by the same name written by Zaigham Imam.

== Cast ==
- Lalit Mohan Tiwari as Maulvi Sahab
- Nazim Khan as Panditji
- Garrick Chaudhary as Janu
- Pawan Tiwari as Auto driver
- Ruby Saini as Amma

== Festivals ==
Dozakh has been screened at various film festivals across the world. These include Kolkata International Film Festival; Habitat Film Festival 2014, Bangalore International Film Festival 2013; 12 Third Eye Asian Film Festival, Mumbai; Indian International Film Festival of Queensland 2014; 3rd Ladakh International Film Festival; Hidden Gems Film Festival, Canada.

== Controversies ==
The film had a minor run in the censor board when it was denied a certificate at first two screenings, Mid-day reported on the same.

== Critical reception ==
DNA newspaper in a review of the film stated, "Dozakh reinforces the influence that cinema can have on the thought process of a society." Deccan Herald wrote, "potent theme of religious tension will leave audiences spell bound".
