= Zaigham Imam =

Indian filmmaker (born 1982)

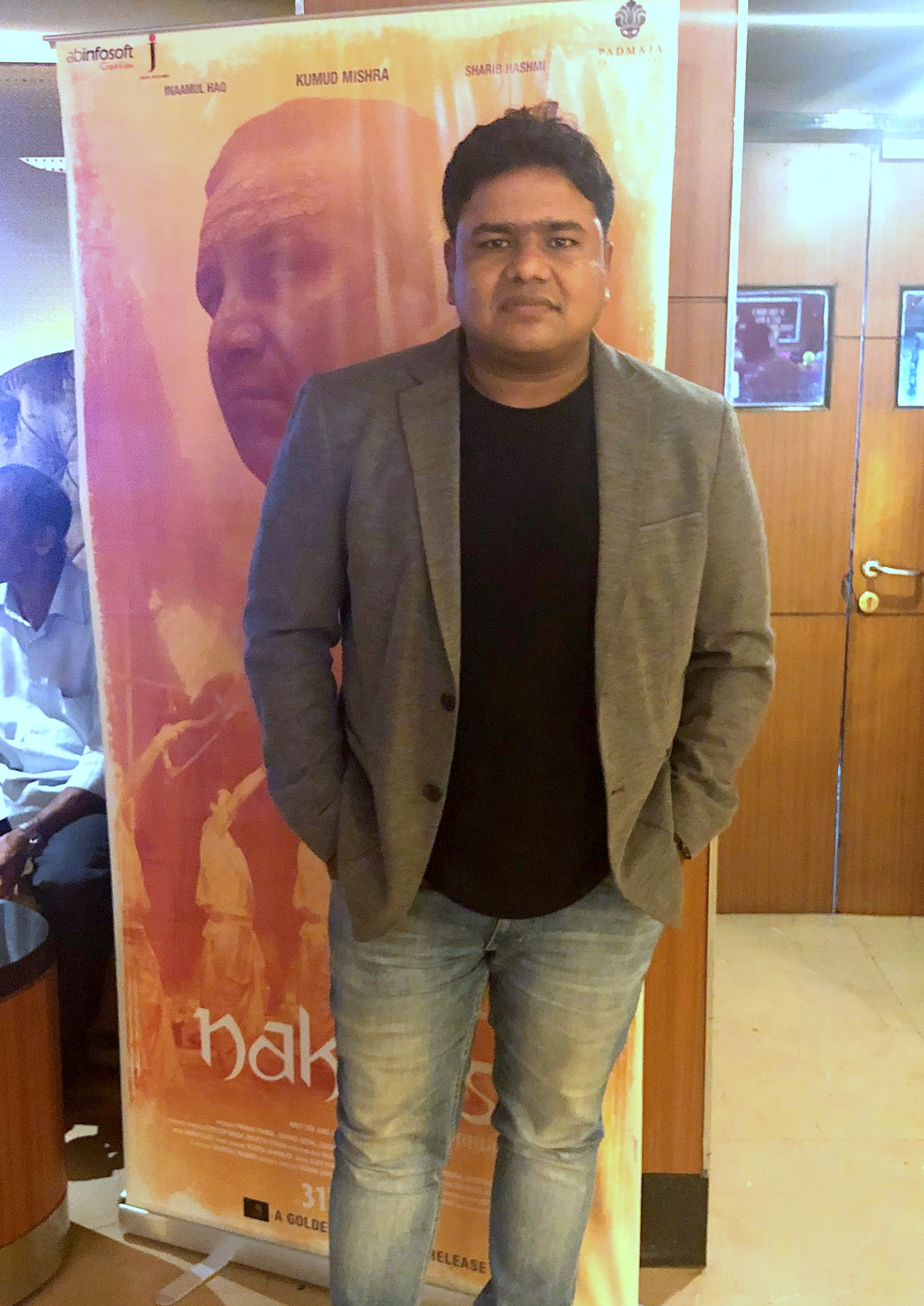
- Imam at the premier of Nakkash
- Born: 10 December 1982 (age 43); Varanasi, Uttar Pradesh, India
- Occupations: Writer, director, producer

Zaigham Imam (born 10 December 1982) is an Indian film director, writer, and producer, known for Nakkash, Dozakh in Search of Heaven, and Alif, He has written two books, Main Mohabbat and Dozakh, both published by Rajkamal Prakashan. He won the Best Director award for Nakkash at the India International Film Festival of Boston (IIFFB) 2019.

== Career ==
Imam spent nearly ten years as a media professional and worked for Hindi newspapers such Amar Ujala and the news channels Aaj Tak. He then started writing dialogues, stories and screenplays, and was a researcher on Indian TV dramas. He entered Bollywood by adapting his own novel Dozakh: in Search of Heaven for the screen.

In Dozakh: In Search Of Heaven, Imam took on the roles of writer, director and producer. The release in March 2015 was well-received and won awards and nominations in various international film festivals. Amitabh Bachchan complimented him by saying "'Dozakh' is a sensitive film, made by sensitive people."

Imam's second feature film, Alif, his second feature film, was released on February 3, 2017. The trailer was launched by former Uttar Pradesh Chief Minister Akhilesh Yadav. The film was narrated by Jaya Bachchan and got acclaimed as 'A Pearl in the sea of Bollywood'. Alif was well-received critics as well as in the general audience, and the television rights to Alif were bought. It also premiered at Australia's Indian International Film Festival.

Imam'ss third film, Nakkash, was made in 2019, completing the trilogy of stories set around the holy city of Varanasi, India. The I & B Ministry selected Nakkash to represent the spirit of communal harmony in India and sponsored its launch in the "India Pavilion" at Cannes, where it was showcased during the 71st Cannes Film Festival 2018. Nakkash was released on 31 May 2019 in India.

== Filmography ==
| Year | Title | Director | Writer | Producer |
|---|---|---|---|---|
| 2011 | Looteri Dulhan | No | Yes | No |
| 2015 | Dozakh in Search of Heaven | Yes | Yes | Yes |
| 2016 | Alif | Yes | Yes | Yes |
| 2019 | Nakkash | Yes | Yes | Yes |
| 2026 | The Narmada Story | Yes | Yes | No |
