= Shivani Gosain =

Indian television actress (born 1975)

- Born: 21 June 1975 (age 51); Udaipur, Rajasthan, India
- Occupation: Actress
- Years active: 1997–present
- Spouse: Rajeev Gandhi (m. 2011; div. 2012)

Shivani Gosain is an Indian television actress, who appeared in Mythological Serials like Jai Ganga Maiya As Devi Uma, Jai Mahalakshmi as Devi Saraswati and various other serials like Kasautii Zindagii Kay, Kahaani Ghar Ghar Kii, Rang Badalti Odhani, Love U Zindagi and Piya Ka Ghar Pyaara Lage. Moreover, she has also appeared in episodics of Ssshhhh...Phir Koi Hai.

== Television ==
Year	Title	Role	Notes
2001	Jai Mahalakshmi	Devi Saraswati	
2001–2004	Kasautii Zindagii Kay	Suman Sharma	
2003	Jai Ganga Maiya	Devi Parvati	
2005	Kahaani Ghar Ghar Kii		
2005–2009	Hari Mirchi Lal Mirchi	Various	
2007	Ssshhhh... Phir Koi Hai	Meena	Episode: "Nayi Maa"
2008	Ssshhhh... Phir Koi Hai		Episode: "Do Gaz Zameen Ke Neechey"
2008	Ssshhhh... Phir Koi Hai		Episode: "Vetaal Ki Wapsi"
2008–2010	Kabhi Saas Kabhi Bahu	Shalini	
2009–2010	Bajega Band Baaja		
2010	Rang Badalti Odhani	Hetal	
2011	Love U Zindagi	Vimmi	
2011–2013	Piya Ka Ghar Pyaara Lage	Banto Malhotra	
2014	Saraswatichandra	Sunanda	
2018	Kasam Tere Pyaar Ki	Parminder "Pammi" Kohli	
2019	Shakti – Astitva Ke Ehsaas Ki	Sunaina Singh	
2019	Choti Sarrdaarni	Vijyeta Mallik	
2019–2020	Kahaan Hum Kahaan Tum	Rani Verma	
2020	Naagin 5	Ritu Sharma	
2023–2024	Tulsidham Ke Laddu Gopal	Vasundhara Trigun Solanki	
2025	Rishto Se Bandhi Gauri	Kamini	
2025–present	Rangbaazi Dilon Ki	Pushpa Pandey	

== Personal life ==
Gosain was first married at the age of 17 but she had a divorce. She married Rajeev Gandhi in late 2011, whom she had met on Facebook. After a few weeks, she opted for a divorce.
