= Crime Next Door =

- Genre: Crime
- Story by: Deepankar Prakash
- Directed by: Deepankar Prakash
- Starring: Anupriya Goenka; Aijaj Khan; Aham Sharma; Trishna Singh; Gagan Pareek; Boloram Das; Rajendra Gupta; Girish Kulkarni; Ravi Sah; Mohan Kapur; Madhura Welankar Satam; Yashpal Sharma; Vatsal Sheth; Ipshita Chakrabarty Singh; Trishna Singh; Sahil Vaid
- Theme music composer: Abhishek Jain
- Country of origin: India
- Original language: Hindi
- No. of seasons: 1
- No. of episodes: 15

Production
- Producers: Pranay Garg; Karan Mukarka
- Production location: Jaipur
- Cinematography: Puneet Dhakar; Yogesh Narang
- Running time: 10-15 minutes
- Production companies: Neeljai Films; Kara Studios

Original release
- Network: Hotstar
- Release: 28 May 2021

Crime Next Door is an Indian web series from Disney+ Hotstar Quix. The Hindi language mini web series was released on 28 May 2021. It is available on online streaming platform Disney+ Hotstar Quix app to watch online.

== Cast ==
- Ravi Sah as Inspector Shekhawat
- Girish Kulkarni as Ranjeet Singh
- Madhura Welankar Satam as Shweta Singh
- Anupriya Goenka as Sujata
- Sahil Vaid as Aneer
- Aham Sharma as Dushyant
- Vatsal Sheth as Amit
- Ipshita Chakraborty Singh as Shashi
- Trishna Singh as Anjali
- Gagan Pareek as Bus Driver
- Boloram Das as Kishore
- Rajendra Gupta
- Mohan Kapur
- Yashpal Sharma

== Development ==
On 27 May 2021, first trailer of the web show was released on YouTube. On 28 May 2021, all episodes of the web series were aired on Hotstar.
