= Ram Singh Charlie =

2020 Indian drama film

- Promotional poster
- Directed by: Nitin Kakkar
- Written by: Sharib Hashmi; Nitin Kakkar
- Produced by: Sharib Hashmi; Nitin Kakkar; Umesh Pawar
- Starring: Kumud Mishra; Divya Dutta; Akarsh Khurana; Farrukh Seyer
- Cinematography: Subranshu Das; Madhav Salunkhe
- Edited by: Shachindra Vats
- Music by: Troy Arif; Arijit Datta
- Production company: Little Too Much Productions
- Distributed by: Sony LIV
- Release date: 28 August 2020
- Country: India
- Language: Hindi

Ram Singh Charlie is a 2020 Indian Hindi-language drama film directed by Nitin Kakkar. Written by Kakkar and Sharib Hashmi, the film follows the life of a circus artist and his subsequent struggle after the circus is shut. Varun Gupta is the creative producer of the film It stars Kumud Mishra in the title role along with Divya Dutta, Akarsh Khurana and Farrukh Seyer in pivotal roles. Ram Singh Charlie was released on 28 August 2020 on Sony Liv.

== Plot ==
Ram Singh (also known as Charlie) works in Jango Circus mimicking Charlie Chaplin, which is the most popular act of the circus. His father worked as a clown in circus too and he grew up living the life of circus. He teaches his school-going son tricks of the trade training him likewise. His wife Kajri also performs and is now expecting a second child. But due to the advent of digital media, circus becomes a non-profit able business. Masterji who runs the circus is forced by her son Nabeel to shut it down and all the artist are left adrift looking for various jobs.

Given the pregnancy of Kajri, Ramsingh urges her to their son Chintu to their village so their expenses would be managed in a better way. Ramsingh gets a job in an event company where he befriends Shahjahan. For entertainment, they play cricket dressed up as human sized chickens. In one such cricket match, Ramsingh is unable to bear his thirst and removed his costume to drink water. Audience which is full of children start booing him and the organizers fire them without paying a penny. Shahjahan helps Ramsingh to get job as a rickshaw puller in Kolkata. When Kajri gives birth to a daughter, she returns and is surprised to know of Ramsingh's job and that he has taken up drinking. In a school event, Chintu decides to play Charlie and to Kajri's surprise Ramsingh joins his son in the act. After the act he thanks Kajri for giving him back his life as artist that he had forgotten.

Ramsingh reaches out to Nabeel for his support to restart the circus. He is disheartened to know that Masterji, Nabeel's mom, passed away. Nabeel agrees to help him put charges him 1.5 Lakh rupees so he can buy all the material of the old Jango Circus. Shahjahan supports Ramsingh by giving a loan of 92 thousand rupees. Ramsingh's friend Cut gets badly beaten by a bully who abuses him for his dwarfness. Ramsingh pays his hospital bills through the money which Shahjahan had provided. Nabeel has a change of heart and provides all supplies free of cost. The new circus is now ready. However, Cut succumbs to the injuries. Shahjahan frowns on his death and Ramsingh leaves the new circus forever.

Now, Chintu is a young chap performing in an act on stage and he thanks his dad Ramsingh Charlie for all that he did for his family and for inspiring him to follow his artistic dreams.

== Cast ==
- Kumud Mishra as Ram Singh
- Divya Dutta as Kajri
- Akarsh Khurana as Nabeel
- Farrukh Seyer as Shahjehan
- Sharib Hashmi as Raghunath
- Saanand Verma as Event manager
- Salima Raza as Masterji (Nabeel's mother)
- Lilliput as Short
- KK Goswami as Cut

== Reception ==
Rajeev Masand said that the film "has its heart in the right place but the screenplay is entirely predictable." Further saying, "Yet the film doesn’t completely derail because the artiste at the center of it anchors it with a performance that is riveting." Shubhra Gupta of The Indian Express noted that the film "stays pretty much on point with its gentle messaging: optimism and a never-give-up spirit is the only way we can survive." Saibal Chatterjee of NDTV praised Mishra's performance, stating: "He slips into the skin of a mimic, whose life slides into chaos when the itinerant circus he was born into shuts down."
