= Firaaq =

- Poster
- Directed by: Nandita Das
- Written by: Nandita Das; Shuchi Kothari
- Produced by: Percept Picture Company
- Starring: Naseeruddin Shah; Sanjay Suri; Raghubir Yadav; Inaamulhaq; Deepti Naval; Paresh Rawal; Shahana Goswami; Nawazuddin Siddiqui; Tisca Chopra; Dilip Joshi; Amruta Subhash
- Cinematography: Ravi K. Chandran
- Edited by: A. Sreekar Prasad
- Production company: Percept Picture Company
- Release dates: 5 September 2008 (TIFF); 20 March 2009 (India)
- Running time: 112 minutes
- Country: India
- Language: Hindi

Firaaq (English: Separation) is a 2008 Indian Hindi-language drama film written and directed by Nandita Das. It is set one month after the 2002 violence in Gujarat, India, and looks at the aftermath and its effects on the lives of everyday people. It claims to be based on "a thousand true stories." Firaaq means both separation and quest in Arabic. The film is the directorial debut of actress Nandita Das and stars Naseeruddin Shah, Deepti Naval, Nawazuddin Siddiqui, Inaamulhaq, Nassar, Paresh Rawal, Sanjay Suri, Raghubir Yadav, Shahana Goswami, Amruta Subhash, and Tisca Chopra.

The film has largely been well received locally and internationally. Firaaq won three awards at the Asian Festival of First Films in Singapore in December 2008, the Special Prize at the International Thessaloniki Film Festival, and an award at the Kara Film Festival in Pakistan. It won two National Film Awards at the 56th National Film Awards. The film was banned in Gujarat owing to the communally sensitive subject of the film.

== Plot ==
Firaaq follows the lives of several ordinary people, some who were victims, some silent observers, and some perpetrators one month after the 2002 violence in Gujarat. It focuses on how their lives are affected and (irrevocably) changed.

The story is set over a 24-hour period, one month after a carnage that took place in Gujarat, India, in 2002. This sectarian violence killed more than 900 Muslims and 300+ Hindus (reported); hundreds of thousands were made homeless on both sides.

Khan Saheb (Naseeruddin Shah) is an elderly Muslim classical vocalist who remains blissfully optimistic of the situation happening around him. His servant, Karim Mian (Raghubir Yadav), tries to alert him to the problems the Muslim community is facing, but Khan Saheb only realises the extent of the trauma upon seeing the destruction of a shrine dedicated to the Sufi saint, Wali Gujarati. A middle-aged Hindu housewife, Aarti (Deepti Naval), is traumatised because she did not help a Muslim woman being chased by a mob and finds a way to atone for her sins upon finding Mohsin, a Muslim orphan who wanders the city in search for his family. Meanwhile, her husband, Sanjay (Paresh Rawal), and his brother, Deven (Dilip Joshi), try to bribe police officers to prevent Deven's arrest for gang rape. Muneera (Shahana Goswami) and her husband Hanif (Nawazuddin Siddiqui) are a young Muslim couple who return home only to find it looted and burnt. Muneera struggles to relate to her Hindu neighbour Jyoti (Amruta Subash) in the following days, as she suspects her of taking part in the looting. Hanif, along with several other Muslim men, plan to retaliate against the violence and their helplessness by searching for a gun to exact revenge. Sameer Shaikh (Sanjay Suri) and Anuradha Desai (Tisca Chopra) are a wealthy, interreligious couple whose store was burnt during the carnage. They decide to move to Delhi to escape the violence, and Sameer comes into conflict with his wife's family over expressing his identity as a Muslim in India.

== Cast ==
- Naseeruddin Shah as Jaagir Khan Saheb
- Deepti Naval as Aarti
- Sanjay Suri as Sameer Arshad Shaikh
- Nawazuddin Siddiqui as Hanif
- Inaamulhaq as Munna
- Paresh Rawal as Sanjay
- Sumeet Raghavan as Dr. Subhash
- Raghubir Yadav as Karim
- Mohammad Samad as Mohsin
- Shahana Goswami as Muneera
- Amruta Subhash as Jyoti
- Tisca Chopra as Anuradha Desai
- Shafi as Ghogha
- Dr Sridhar Kumar as Police Officer
- Ruhi Singh as Sakina
- Nassar as Grave Digger
- Dilip Joshi as Deven
- Rahul Singh as Rajat, Ketaki's husband
- Jasbir Thandi as Cop at Lucky's restaurant
- Honey Chhaya as Bapuji
- Sucheta Trivedi as Ketaki
- Sakina as Ruhi

== Music ==
Composed by Piyush Kanojia and Rajat Dholakia, the lyrics of the songs are penned by Gulzar.

| No. | Title | Singer(s) | Length |
|---|---|---|---|
| 1. | "Meri Gali Mein Andhera" | Sukhvinder Singh | 03:43 |
| 2. | "Gujarat Ke Firaaq Soon Hai" | Jagjit Singh | 06:46 |
| 3. | "Ummeed Ab Kahi Koi Dar Kholti Nahi" | Rekha Bhardwaj | 05:41 |
| 4. | "Daag Daag Ujaala" | Faiz Ahmed Faiz | 02:10 |
| 5. | "Kuchh is Tarah" | Mohit Chauhan, Tulsi Kumar | 04:44 |

== Reception ==
Firaaq won top honours at the Asian Festival of First Films 2008 in Singapore, where it won the awards for "Best Film", "Screenplay / Script", and "Foreign Correspondents Assn. Purple Orchid Award for Best Film". The film has won awards at other international festivals, including the Special Prize award at the International Thessaloniki Film Festival in Greece, the Special Jury Award at the International Film Festival of Kerala, and the Best Editor award for Sreekar Prasad at the Dubai International Film Festival. It won an award at the Kara Film Festival in Pakistan. Gautam Sen for "its perfect use of props and choice of colours to enhance the ambience of a post-riots" won National Film Award for Best Art Direction. A. Sreekar Prasad also won a National Film Award for "aesthetically weaving together unrelated sequences to heighten the dramatic impact" in the Best Editing category at the 56th National Film Awards.

It was released in India on 20 March 2009 and received critical acclaim. Taran Adarsh in his review of the film on Bollywood Hungama called it disturbing, powerful and thought-provoking and gave it 4.5 stars out of five.

Professional ratings
Review scores
| Source | Rating |
|---|---|
| Bollywood Hungama | 4.5/5 stars |
| CNN IBN | 3/5 stars |
| Glamsham | 3/5 stars |
| MouthShut | 4/5 stars |
| Movie Talkies | 3.5/5 stars |
| Outlook India | 3/5 stars |
| Rediff.com | 4/5 stars |
| The Times of India | 3.5/5 stars |

=== Awards and honours ===
2009 Kara Film Festival

- Won – Best Film

2008 Asian Festival of First Films

- Won – Best Film
- Won – Best Screenplay
- Won – Foreign Correspondents Association Purple Orchid Award for Best Film

2009 International Film Festival of Kerala

- Won – Special Jury Award

2009 International Thessaloniki Film Festival

- Won – Special Prize (Everyday Life: Transcendence or Reconciliation Award)
- Nominated – Golden Alexander for Best Film

19th Cinequest Film Festival San Jose, USA (2009)

- Won – The Maverick Spirit Award

56th National Film Awards (2009)

- Best Art Direction – Gautam Sen
- Best Editing – A. Sreekar Prasad

55th Filmfare Awards (2010)

- Critics Award for Best Movie
- Special Award – Nandita Das
- Best Editing – A. Sreekar Prasad
- Best Sound Design – Manas Chaudhury
- Best Costume Design – Vaishali Menon

== See also ==
- Barkha Dutt
