= Khoj - Parchaiyo Ke Uss Paar =

- Official poster of the series
- Genre: Mystery, Thriller
- Created by: Prabal Baruah
- Directed by: Prabal Baruah
- Country of origin: India
- Original language: Hindi
- No. of seasons: 1
- No. of episodes: 7

Production
- Producer: Samar Khan
- Cinematography: Shanu Singh Rajput
- Editor: Rajkumar Chaturvedi

Original release
- Release: 27 December 2024

Khoj – Parchaiyo Ke Uss Paar is a Hindi mystery thriller web series, directed by Prabal Baruah and produced by Juggernaut. and Editor by Prakash Kumar The series stars Sharib Hashmi, Anupriya Goenka, and Aamir Dalvi in key roles. It debuted on ZEE5 on 27 December 2024.

== Plot summary ==
Ved (Sharib Hashmi) is searching for his wife, Meera, who has gone missing. As he investigates her disappearance, he encounters strange events and clues that make him question what is real. A police officer doubts Ved’s story, and Ved begins to question his own sanity. Throughout the series, he tries to prove that the woman claiming to be Meera is not really his wife. The show explores themes of identity, truth, and mental distress.

== Cast and characters ==
- Sharib Hashmi as Ved
- Anupriya Goenka as Meera
- Aamir Dalvi as Inspector Anmol Sathe
- Hasnain Siddiqui as Ram Singh
- Kriti Garg as Aditi
- Himakshi Borah as real Meera

== Episodes ==
No.	Title	Directed by	Original release date
1	"Woh Kaun Thi"	Prabal Baruah	27 December 2024
On his birthday, Ved’s life takes a dramatic turn when his wife, Meera, suddenly disappears. As he searches for her, he encounters a skeptical police officer and uncovers a startling truth about his wife’s true identity.
2	"Kaun Hai Meera"	Prabal Baruah	27 December 2024
Ved rejects Meera's assertion that she is his wife, despite her revealing personal details about their relationship. Meera’s motives come under suspicion when she is seen secretly adding a mysterious powder to Ved’s coffee.
3	"Aar Ya Paar"	Prabal Baruah	27 December 2024
Ved uncovers a shocking mark on Meera and brings Tia to help identify her. After a confrontation with Mrs. Fernandes, he eventually accepts Meera. Meanwhile, Ved confronts Amol at his door, interrupting him in the process.
4	"Chupa Pehlu"	Prabal Baruah	27 December 2024
Suspicious of Meera, Ved takes matters into his own hands and arranges a DNA test. He also recruits Devraj to keep an eye on her. As he digs deeper, Ved uncovers secret codes and learns about her cryptic meetings at a café.
5	"Nehle Pe Dehla"	Prabal Baruah	27 December 2024
Devraj steals Meera’s purse and hands it over to Ved, who uncovers unsettling information about himself. Concerned, Meera takes Ved to a doctor, who recommends tests to uncover the cause of his memory loss.
6	"Aakhri Raasta"	Prabal Baruah	27 December 2024
After the MRI, Ved begins to experience troubling flashes. His medical reports reveal significant mental health concerns. Meera sends a divorce lawyer to him, and in the midst of it all, Ved discovers that Tia has gone missing from the hostel.
7	"Kahaani Uss Raat Ki"	Prabal Baruah	27 December 2024
An enraged Ved confronts Meera after discovering that she is the one who took Tia. However, his violent reaction leads to his arrest by Amol. The charges against Ved include kidnapping and assault.

== Critical reception ==
Sreeparna Sengupta of The Times of India rated the series 3.0 out of 5 stars, stating, "Overall as a suspense thriller, 'Khoj - Parchaiyo ke Uss Paar' makes a sincere effort to keep the intrigue going. And makes for a decent one-time watch."

Sonal Verma of Times Now also rated 3.0 stars, commenting on the narrative's focus on Ved’s attempts to prove that the woman claiming to be Meera is not his wife. Verma further noted that the series addresses themes such as women’s rights, the consequences of domestic violence, and the impact of childhood traumas.

Jyotsna Rawat of Punjab Kesari awarded 3.5, noting "Khoj - Parchaiyo ke Uss Paar is an interesting psychological thriller, full of mind-blowing incidents."
