= Giriraj Kabra =

Indian actor

- Born: 2 August, Jabalpur, Madhya Pradesh, India
- Occupations: Actor, Model
- Years active: 2008–present

Giriraj Kabra is an Indian film and television actor, who has been active since 2008. After completing an acting course from the Roshan Taneja School of Acting in Mumbai, he made his debut as Balwinder Singh in the film Kirkit. As a television actor, his debut was in Mata Ki Chowki as Madhav. Shortly after his debut, he was cast in the lead role of Bittu in Hi! Padosi... Kaun Hai Doshi? When this show’s name was changed to Piya Ka Ghar Pyaara Lage , Giriraj remained on the show until 2013, when he was suddenly replaced by Raj Singh Suryavanshi; the show was terminated shortly after Giriraj’s exit.

Giriraj has also appeared on the show Meri Aashiqui Tum Se Hi as Rishi Vyas, Kismat Connection as Rahul, Yeh Kahan Aa Gaye Hum as Harsh Chatterjee, Kundali Bhagya as Rajat Bedi, Daayan as Kaalnemi, Laal Ishq as Mangat, and Yeshu as Devdoot.

As a model, Giriraj, has walked the ramp at the New York Fashion Week.

== Filmography ==
=== Film ===
Year	! Title	! Role	! Ref.
2009	Kirkit	Balwinder Singh	

=== Television ===
Year	Title	Role	Ref.
2008–2011	Mata Ki Chowki	Madhav	
2011	Hi! Padosi... Kaun Hai Doshi?	Bitto	
2011–2013	Piya Ka Ghar Pyaara Lage	Bitto	
2014–2016	Meri Aashiqui Tum Se Hi	Rishi Vyas	
2015	Kismat Connection	Rahul	
2015–2016	Yeh Kahan Aa Gaye Hum	Harsh Chatterjee	
2018–2019	Daayan	Kaalnemi	
2018	Laal Ishq	Mangat	
2020–2021	Yeshu	Devdoot	
2021	Kundali Bhagya	Rajat Bedi	
2021–2022	Sasural Simar Ka 2	Mohit	
