= Manikarnika International Film Festival =

- Location: Varanasi, India
- Founded: 2022
- Founded by: Sumit Mishra
- Most recent: 2023
- Website: www.manikarnikaiff.in

Manikarnika International Film Festival is an annual film festival held in Varanasi, Uttar Pradesh. Inaugurated in 2022, The event is organised by Manikarnika Film Festival Trust.

== History ==
The festival was started in 2022 by Indian film director and painter Sumit Mishra. It was inaugurated by Bollywood actor Sanjay Mishra. The first event was held from 15 To 18 October 2022 in Varanasi, India.

The purpose of the festival is to present domestic and international films as a form of art, as a form of entertainment and as a sector with a culture of openness and dialogue.

== 2022 ==
In the year 2022, The festival got 113 film entries from 14 countries out of which 21 feature films was selected and 60 short film was screened in the festival.

== 2023 ==
In the year 2023, The festival got 130 film entries from 18 countries out of which 18 feature films and 37 short films was selected.
