= Haunted Nights =

- Also known as: Vikram Bhatt's Haunted Nights
- Genre: Horror
- Written by: Deepak Malik, Amitabh Singh, Sharad Tripathi, Pallavi Lumba,Ranu Ghildyal
- Directed by: Vikram Bhatt, Vicky Chauhan, Hitesh Tejwani, Roy V.George
- Starring: Cast
- Country of origin: India
- Original language: Hindi
- No. of episodes: 465

Production
- Producer: The Entertainment Hub
- Production location: India
- Camera setup: Motion Camera
- Running time: 24 minutes

Original release
- Network: Sahara One
- Release: 20 February 2012 – 29 November 2013

Haunted Nights is a fiction show telecasted on Sahara One from 20 February 2012. This show is directed by Vikram Bhatt. Some of those who acted in the show are Rashami Desai, Shilpa Saklani, Manini Mishra, Sakshi Tanwar, Gautami Kapoor, Amit Sareen Priya Marathe, Manish Gandhi, and Nivin Ramani. The show is produced by The Entertainment Hub which also produced Piya Ka Ghar Pyaara Lage on Sahara One.

== List of series ==
Series No.	Series name	Start date	End date	No. of episodes	Cast
1	Bhootiya ghar	02/20/2012	02/24/2012	5	Rashami Desai as Shivani, Chaitanya Choudhury as Rahul
2	Rani Dhillo	02/27/2012	03/02/2012	5	Amit Sareen as Dr. Amit, Shilpa Saklani as Shilpa
3	Sanjana	03/05/2012	03/09/2012	5	
4	Khandar	03/12/2012	03/16/2012	5	
5	Kidnapp	03/19/2012	03/23/2012	5	
6	Sunday night	03/26/2012	03/30/2012	5	
7	Aatma House	03/30/2012	04/06/2012	5	Aashka Goradia as Nandini
8	Dhongi	04/09/2012	04/13/2012	5	
9	Bhootiya Khatarnak Jungle	04/16/2012	04/20/2012	5	
10	Bhaviysavani	04/23/2012	04/27/2012	5	
11	Jalim	04/30/2012	05/04/2012	5	
12	Hatyara	05/07/2012	05/11/2012	5	
13	Khoon	05/14/2012	05/18/2012	5	
14	Kali Raat	05/21/2012	05/25/2012	5	
15	Raaz	05/28/2012	06/01/2012	5	
16	Aakhri Khwahish	06/04/2012	06/08/2012	5	Bhuvnesh Mann as Sunil
17	Kabristan Ka Padri	06/11/2012	06/15/2012	5	
18	Pyasi Aatma	06/18/2012	06/22/2012	5	
19	C Block 13	06/25/2012	06/29/2012	5	
20	Mirror Story	07/02/2012	07/06/2012	5	
21	Ghungroo	07/09/2012	07/13/2012	5	
22	Planchet	07/16/2012	07/20/2012	5	
23	Mujhe Mat Maro Maa	07/23/2012	07/27/2012	5	
24	Badla	07/30/2012	08/03/2012	5	
25	Narpisaach	08/06/2012	08/10/2012	5	
26	Jaadu Tona Guest House	08/13/2012	08/17/2012	5	Sudeep Sarangi as Writer-director Rahul Bhatt
27	Jinnaath	08/20/2012	08/24/2012	5	
28	Painting	08/27/2012	08/31/2012	5	
29	Faisla	09/03/2012	09/07/2012	5	Aashish Kaul as Advocate Vinod Sinha
30	Apharan Billo Ka	09/10/2012	09/14/2012	5	
31	Aankhon Wala Andha	09/17/2012	09/21/2012	5	
32	Kaala Jaadu	09/24/2012	09/28/2012	5	
33	Dehshiyat	10/01/2012	10/05/2012	5	
34	Dayan	10/08/2012	10/12/2012	5	
35	200 Saal Ka Aadmi	10/15/2012	10/19/2012	5	
36	Dracula	10/22/2012	10/26/2012	5	
37	Kaal Chakra	10/29/2012	11/02/2012	5	
38	Mridhula	11/05/2012	11/09/2012	5	
39	Accident	11/12/2012	11/16/2012	5	
40	Aankhein	11/19/2012	11/23/2012	5	
41	Jo Darr Gaya Wo Marr Gaya	11/26/2012	11/30/2012	5	
42	Bhay	12/03/2012	12/07/2012	5	
43	Tattoo	12/10/2012	12/14/2012	5	
44	Asoor Ki Raat	12/17/2012	12/21/2012	5	
45	Honour Killing	12/24/2012	12/28/2012	5	
46	Dahej	12/31/2012	01/04/2013	5	
47	Shaitaan	01/07/2012	01/11/2012	5	
48	Darr	01/14/2012	01/18/2012	5	
49	Kinnar	01/21/2012	01/25/2012	5	
50	Chudail	01/28/2012	02/01/2012	5	
51	Tourist Bungalow	02/04/2012	02/08/2012	5	
52	Goonj	02/11/2013	02/15/2013	5	
53	Cheekh	02/18/2013	02/22/2013	5	
54	Kidnap	02/25/2013	03/01/2013	5	
55	Bungalow No. 13	03/04/2013	03/08/2013	5	
56	Renovation	03/11/2013	03/15/2013	5	
57	Dhokha	03/18/2013	03/22/2013	5	
58	Possession	03/25/2013	03/29/2013	5	
59	Saaya	04/01/2013	04/05/2013	5	
60	Mazaar	04/08/2013	04/12/2013	5	
61	Adhuri Dulhan	04/15/2013	04/19/2013	5	
62	Rahasya	04/22/2013	04/26/2013	5	
63	Pisaachini	04/29/2013	05/03/2013	5	
64	Woh Phir Ayegi	05/06/2013	05/10/2013	5	
65	Haveli Photo Shoot	05/13/2013	05/17/2013	5	
66	Saatva Mahina	05/20/2013	05/24/2013	5	
67	Khoobsurat Daayan	05/27/2013	05/31/2013	5	
68	Gumshuda	06/03/2013	06/07/2013	5	
69	Anth	06/10/2013	06/14/2013	5	
70	Khel	06/17/2013	06/21/2013	5	
71	MMS	06/24/2013	06/28/2013	5	
72	Ek Shart	07/01/2013	07/05/2013	5	
73	Daak Bangla	07/08/2013	07/12/2013	5	
74	Begunaah	07/15/2013	07/19/2013	5	
75	Kangan	07/22/2013	07/26/2013	5	
76	Naina	07/29/2013	08/02/2013	5	
77	Aghortantra	08/05/2013	08/09/2013	5	Aashish Kaul as Mukesh
78	The Victim	08/12/2013	08/16/2013	5	
79	Haqeeqat	08/19/2013	08/23/2013	5	
80	Kaun Hai Woh	08/26/2013	11/29/2013	70	
