= Bobby Jasoos =

2014 Indian film by Samar Shaikh

- Theatrical release poster
- Directed by: Samar Shaikh
- Written by: Samar Shaikh
- Screenplay by: Sanyuktha Chawla Shaikh
- Story by: Samar Shaikh
- Produced by: Dia Mirza; Sahil Sangha
- Starring: Vidya Balan; Ali Fazal; Arjan Bajwa
- Cinematography: Vishal Sinha
- Edited by: Hemal Kothari
- Music by: Shantanu Moitra; Swanand Kirkire (lyrics)
- Production companies: Born Free Entertainment; Reliance Entertainment
- Distributed by: Reliance Entertainment
- Release date: 4 July 2014 (India)
- Running time: 121 minutes
- Country: India
- Language: Hindi
- Budget: ₹26 crore
- Box office: est.₹20.38 crore

Bobby Jasoos (transl. Detective Bobby) is a 2014 Indian Hindi-language comedy thriller film directed by Samar Shaikh and produced by Dia Mirza and Sahil Sangha. The film stars Vidya Balan and features Ali Fazal, Arjan Bajwa, Supriya Pathak, Rajendra Gupta and Tanvi Azmi in supporting roles. It tells the story of Bilqees "Bobby" Ahmed, a Hyderabadi woman who aspires to be a detective despite facing a series of obstacles.

== Plot ==
Living in a middle-class, orthodox family in Old Hyderabad, Bilqees Ahmed, aka Bobby, is a wannabe private detective. She lives with her Abba, Ammi, Kausar Khala and two younger sisters including Noor in the Moghalpura area near Charminar. To pursue her passion for spying, Bobby solves petty neighbourhood cases such as helping Tasawwur, a TV show host, to get rid of marriage proposals brought home by his parents. Bobby finally gets her big break when a rich NRI, Anees Khan, hands her a case of finding two missing girls named 'Niloufer' and 'Aamna' with a birth mark on their hand and shoulder respectively. To solve the case, Bobby takes up many get-ups such as 'beggar', 'peon', 'hawker', 'nerd student', 'astrologer' and even a fake 'TV producer'. After locating the targets, Khan pays her a tremendous fee and also offers a huge amount of money to both girls' fathers for reasons unknown to Bobby. Khan also hands over his third and final case of finding a boy with a missing toe named 'Ali'.

Meanwhile, Bobby and Tasawwur's families fix their marriage leaving both in a dilemma about how to get rid of this situation. A local goon named Lala also offers a case to Bobby to break Lala's girlfriend Aafreen (Anupriya Goenka)'s marriage, which is forcefully fixed by her mother Saida. On Bobby's denial, Lala makes her realize that she has been helping the NRI for the wrong cause. Doubting that Bobby tries to know the whereabouts of the two girls, but he gets to know that both girls have gone missing. Scared and shocked, Bobby takes help from Tasawwur and sneaks into Khan's 5 star hotel room to check his background, only to be caught and thrown out by Khan and the hotel staff. But Bobby manages to get a hold of Khan's diary and his old photograph, which later gets into the hands of Lala, who has since started following Bobby.

Khan now suddenly goes into hiding and Bobby starts searching for him with the belief that Khan will not leave the town without his third target Ali. With the help of clues in Khan's diary such as a London based library's stamp and a Biryani order from a local restaurant, Bobby gets to know about Khan's background and later Khan is shown following Ali. It turns out to be a trap to capture Khan. With the twist in the climax, it is revealed that the three people Khan was looking for were his long lost children during communal riots. Khan has offered money to both girl's foster parents for helping them and sent the girls to London to pursue higher education. Tasawwur also enters the scene along with Lala who is actually Khan's long lost son, 'Ali'. The film ends with Bobby becoming a famous detective, while she and Tasawwur are now in love with each other but are still confused about their marriage.

== Cast ==
- Vidya Balan as Bilqees Ahmed aka Bobby
- Ali Fazal as Tasawwur Sheikh
- Arjan Bajwa as Lala
- Kiran Kumar as Anees Khan
- Anupriya Goenka as Aafreen
- Rajendra Gupta as Bilqees' father
- Supriya Pathak as Ammi/ Zebo Ahmed
- Tanvi Azmi as Kausar Khaala
- Benaf Dadachandji as Noor
- Prasad Barve as Shetty
- Aakash Dahiya as Munna
- Zarina Wahab as Afreen's Ammi/ Saida
- Vinay Varma as Tasawwur's father
- Ankita Roy as Niloufer
- Sangeeta Pamnani as Tasawwur's mother
- Gangadhar Pandey as Haji Kamaal
- Rama Rao Jadhav as suspicious man
- Praveen Goel as Rashid Baig
- Tejas Mahajan as Sohail
- Sundeep Hemnaoni as Arif
- Surbhi Chandna as Aamna Khan/ Aditi
- Sukesh Anand as Sodhi
- Kunjan Luthra as Sunita, Hotel receptionist
- G S Patel as Reddy
- Pushpa as Niloufer's mother
- Raina as Zeenat

== Production ==
Filming of Bobby Jasoos was postponed by 11 days from the scheduled date due to an emergency heart surgery of Dia Mirza's mother. Mirza later stated that the filming would commence from 25 November 2013. The filming was to commence from Hyderabad, the city where the story was planned to be based and was supposed to be wrapped by January 2014. Shooting for the film started on 23 November 2013. The film was shot in one long schedule of 55 days.

Vidya Balan was cast in the lead role and Ali Fazal was signed opposite her.

== Soundtrack ==
Bobby Jasoos

Soundtrack album by Shantanu Moitra
- Released: 17 June 2014
- Genre: Feature film soundtrack
- Length: 30:12
- Language: Hindi
- Label: T-Series
External audio
- Audio Jukebox on YouTube

Shantanu Moitra composed the film score, while lyrics are written by Swanand Kirkire. Singers Shreya Ghoshal and Papon were also reported to record a song for the film. Aishwarya Nigam has also recorded a song. Singer Bonnie Chakraborty said in an interview that he has recorded a duet for the film with Shreya Ghoshal.

| No. | Title | Singer(s) | Length |
|---|---|---|---|
| 1. | "Jashn" | Bonnie Chakraborty, Shreya Ghoshal | 5:55 |
| 2. | "Tu" | Papon, Shreya Ghoshal | 7:02 |
| 3. | "B.O.B.B.Y" | Neeraj Shridhar, Shreya Ghoshal | 5:35 |
| 4. | "Sweety" | Aishwarya Nigam, Monali Thakur | 4:38 |
| 5. | "Tu" (Reprise) | Papon, Shreya Ghoshal | 7:03 |
