= Avantika Khattri =

Bollywood Actress and producer

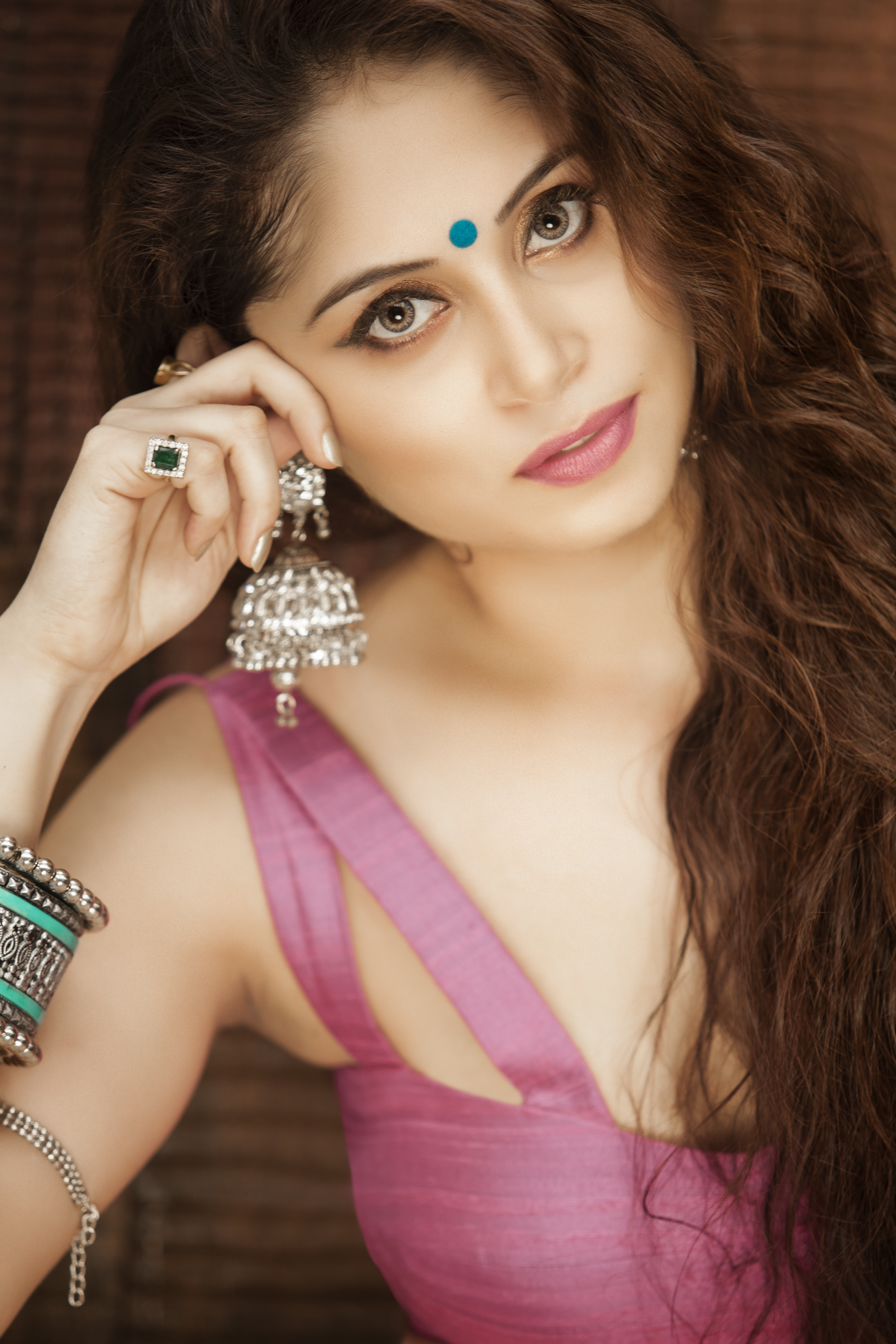
- Born: Avantika Khattri; 20 November 1989 (age 36); Jhansi, Uttar Pradesh (India)
- Occupation: Film Actress Producer Director
- Years active: 2011-present

Avantika Khattri (born 20 November 1989) is an Indian Bollywood actress, producer, and director who debuted with the movie War Chhod Na Yaar in which she played the parallel lead with Soha Ali Khan along with co-stars Sharman Joshi and Javed Jaffrey.

== Career ==
Avantika debuted in Bollywood as an actress with the Hindi movie War Chhod Na Yaar. She had already produced a film titled by Beautiful World which was based on the 2016 incident that happened in Bulandshahr, starring Amruta Subhash, Swanand Kirkire and Shweta Tripathi and it was presented by Anurag Kashyap. Avantika Khatri has done an album named Bottoms Up as a lead actress with Mika Singh.

Avantika's second short film For All That You Are as a producer and also her debut directorial - won the Best LGBTQ Film award at the Top Shorts International Film Festival. The film, which has Avantika playing the protagonist, is a revenge drama revolving around two female ex-lovers. She was chosen as the Best Actress In An Indie Film in Actors Award at Los Angeles; the Best Woman Filmmaker at The IndieFEST Film Awards (US) and the Best Actress-Leading at Accolade Global Film Competition (US). The film also won the award for the Best Short at the Mediterranean Film Festival and Best Short at Canada Shorts Film Festival. Avantika walked the Red Carpet at the 71st Cannes Film Festival where For All That You Are was screened in the Short Film Corner.

Avantika has been awarded with Iconic Producer, Film-Director & Actress at Mid-Day Powerful Women Award 2022 by the Hon’ble Governor of Maharashtra Shri Bhagat Singh Koshyari at Raj Bhawan, Mumbai.

== Early life ==
Avantika hails from Jhansi, a town in Uttar Pradesh, where she was born into a family of creative and medical professionals. Her father is a doctor, while her mother is an artist. She has an MBA in Human Resource. She began her career by performing arts and also dabbled in modelling and featured in the FHM magazine. and others. She has been featured in TV commercials. She also appeared as a Celebrity on Times Food Channel - Cooking with Celebs

== Filmography ==
=== Actor ===
Year	Title	Role	Notes	Reference
2013	War Chhod Na Yaar	Sakshi		
2015	Kuch Kuch Locha Hai	Jacqueline		
2015	Bottoms up	Avantika	Music Video with Mika Singh	
2022	Mere Desh Ki Dharti	Priyanka Khurrana		

=== Producer ===
Year	Title	Role	Director	Notes	Reference
2017	Beautiful World			Short Film	
2018	For All That You Are	Avantika Khattri as Alisha	Avantika Khattri	Short Film	
