= Mission Majnu =

2023 Indian film by Shantanu Bagchi

- Official release poster
- Directed by: Shantanu Bagchi
- Written by: Aseem Arrora; Sumit Batheja; Parveez Shaikh
- Story by: Parveez Shaikh; Aseem Arrora
- Produced by: Ronnie Screwvala; Amar Butala; Garima Mehta
- Starring: Sidharth Malhotra; Rashmika Mandanna; Parmeet Sethi; Sharib Hashmi; Kumud Mishra; Rajit Kapur
- Cinematography: Bijitesh De
- Edited by: Nitin Baid; Siddharth S. Pande
- Music by: Score: Ketan Sodha; Songs: Tanishk Bagchi; Rochak Kohli; Raghav Sachar; Arko
- Production companies: RSVP Movies; Guilty By Association Media
- Distributed by: Netflix
- Release date: 20 January 2023
- Running time: 129 minutes
- Country: India
- Language: Hindi

Mission Majnu is a 2023 Indian Hindi-language spy thriller film directed by Shantanu Bagchi and produced by Ronnie Screwvala, Amar Butala and Garima Mehta. Starring Sidharth Malhotra, the film takes place before and during the Indo-Pakistani War of 1971. Rashmika Mandanna, Parmeet Sethi, Sharib Hashmi, Kumud Mishra, and Rajit Kapur play supporting roles.

The film faced multiple delays, first being scheduled for theatrical release on 13 May 2022 and then on 10 June the same year before being indefinitely delayed. Ultimately, the film's theatrical release was cancelled and it was released directly on Netflix on 20 January 2023 to mixed reviews from critics and audiences.

== Plot ==
In 1971, Amandeep “Aman” Singh IPS is a deep-cover RAW field operative in Pakistan, working undercover as Tariq Hussain. He falls in love with Nasreen Hussain, a blind woman, and they marry. In May 1974, India conducts its first nuclear test, prompting Pakistan to accelerate its secret nuclear weapons programme with the assistance of nuclear engineer Abdul Qadeer Khan.

During the 1977 Indian general election campaign, Prime Minister Indira Gandhi is informed of Pakistan's activities by RAW Chief R. N. Kao and orders him to locate the nuclear facility. Kao assigns the mission to Aman, whose handler, Sharma, names it “Mission Majnu”. Aman encounters two other RAW agents stationed in Pakistan, Aslam Usmaniya and Raman Singh, who operates under the pseudonym Maulvi Saab. He eventually gathers intelligence confirming that Pakistan is developing a nuclear weapon.

Following the election, a new government is formed under Morarji Desai, who favours diplomatic and peaceful relations and opposes warfare, espionage and intelligence operations. To keep the mission in Pakistan active and concealed from Desai, Kao resigns. Meanwhile, Israel prepares to attack the Quetta military facility, mistakenly believing it to be a nuclear weapons site. Aman locates the actual nuclear facility in Kahuta, but cannot obtain physical evidence.

After Sharma learns that Israel plans to attack Quetta within 48 hours, Aman returns to Kahuta and collects hair samples from Army personnel working at the facility. He secretly sends them to India, where tests reveal traces of radiation, indicating the presence of plutonium at Kahuta. The evidence prevents Israel's attack on Quetta and is presented to Desai, who reassesses Pakistan's position and reliability. The ISI subsequently hunts down and kills RAW agents operating in Pakistan, including Aslam and Raman.

Aman attempts to flee to Dubai with his pregnant wife, who remains unaware that the ISI is pursuing them. He distracts the agents long enough for Nasreen to board an aeroplane safely, but is killed. In Dubai, Nasreen meets Kao at the airport and reads a letter from Aman revealing his true identity. Overcome with grief, she breaks down and remembers their love as the film ends.

== Cast ==
- Sidharth Malhotra as Amandeep Ajitpal Singh IPS (Aman) / Tariq Hussain, a RAW agent
- Rashmika Mandanna as Nasreen Hussain/Nasreen Singh, Tariq/Aman’s wife, who is blind and pregnant
- Parmeet Sethi as R.N. Kao
- Sharib Hashmi as Aslam Usmaniya, a RAW field agent
- Mir Sarwar as Abdul Qadeer Khan, a Nuclear Scientist from Pakistan
- Kumud Mishra as Raman Singh / Maulvi Saab, Senior Field agent
- Ashwath Bhatt as General Muhammad Zia-ul-Haq
- Zakir Hussain as Sharma, RAW spy handler
- Rajit Kapur as Zulfikar Ali Bhutto, Prime Minister of Pakistan
- Avijit Dutt as Morarji Desai, Prime Minister of India
- Avantika Akerkar as Indira Gandhi, Prime Minister of India

== Production ==
The film was announced in December 2020. Principal photography began in February 2021 at Lucknow and the film wrapped up in September 2021.

== Soundtrack ==
Mission Majnu

Soundtrack album by Tanishk Bagchi, Rochak Kohli, Raghav Sachar and Arko
- Released: 23 January 2023
- Genre: Feature film soundtrack
- Length: 29:08
- Language: Hindi
- Label: Zee Music Company

Official audio
- Mission Majnu - Full Album on YouTube

The score is composed by Ketan Sodha. The songs are composed by Tanishk Bagchi, Rochak Kohli, Raghav Sachar and Arko, and the lyrics are written by Manoj Muntashir, Shabbir Ahmed, Rohit Sharma and A. M. Turaz.

The first single titled "Rabba Janda" was released on 25 December 2022. The second single titled "Maati Ko Maa Kehte Hain" was released on 17 January 2023.

Track listing
No.	Title	Lyrics	Music	Singer(s)	Length
1.	"Rabba Janda"	Shabbir Ahmed	Tanishk Bagchi	Jubin Nautiyal	4:06
2.	"Maati Ko Maa Kehte Hain"	Manoj Muntashir	Rochak Kohli	Sonu Nigam, Rochak Kohli	3:55
3.	"Channa Ve Assi Marjawange"	Rohit Sharma	Raghav Sachar	Raj Barman	4:53
4.	"Rabba Janda" (Reprise)	Shabbir Ahmed, Tanishk Bagchi	Tanishk Bagchi	Altamash Faridi	0:57
5.	"Tum Ho"	A. M. Turaz	Arko	Papon	3:40
6.	"Channa Ve Assi Marjawange" (Reprise)	Rohit Sharma	Raghav Sachar	Jyotica Tangri	4:51
7.	"Rabba Janda" (Female Version)	Shabbir Ahmed	Tanishk Bagchi	Zyra Nargolwala	2:56
8.	"Maati Ko Maa Kehte Hain" (Extended Version)	Manoj Muntashir	Rochak Kohli	Sonu Nigam	1:25
9.	"Rabba Janda" (Acoustic)	Shabbir Ahmed	Tanishk Bagchi	Jubin Nautiyal	2:25
Total length:					29:08

== Reception ==
Mission Majnu received mixed reviews from critics and audiences. On the review aggregator website Rotten Tomatoes, 25% of 12 critics' reviews are positive, with an average rating of 4.3/10.

Bollywood Hungama rated the film 3.5 out of 5 stars and termed the film as a "gripping saga" with a tight script, intelligent scenes, taut execution, and a memorable performance." Tushar Joshi for India Today rated 3 out of 5 stars and wrote, "Sidharth is good in scenes where he is battling the stigma and pain of his past yet wants to move ahead and show his loyalty to his country and team. Rashmika Mandanna doesn’t have much to do apart from trying to strike up some chemistry with Sid." Dhaval Roy of The Times of India rated the film 3 out of 5 and wrote that the film is "gripping in parts, but it’s too convenient, which takes away from the narrative. While great, the action stretches in places and makes the movie seem formulaic". Dishya Sharma of News 18 rated the film 3 out of 5 stars and wrote "Mission Majnu robs you of the thrills of a spy film. Watch it to see Sidharth and Rashmika in a different avatars".

Anuj Kumar for The Hindu wrote "There are interesting twists in the way Tariq ekes out information and how Nasreen could sense the truth by touch, but the execution makes it a tad too cloying for a thriller. Thankfully, the film is not overtly jingoistic and makes a clear distinction in the way Indira Gandhi and Morarji Desai handled the tenuous relationship with Pakistan in the 1970s. At the same time, the writers place characters on both sides of the border who could see history beyond the divisive version that the politicians often present." Saibal Chatterjee of NDTV rated the movie only 2 stars out of 5 and wrote "Mission Majnu does not deliver a thrill a minute nor does it produce any exceptional degree of tension and suspense. Yet, parts of the film, especially in the second hour, do spring to life." Shilajit Mitra for The New Indian Express rated 2 out of 5 stars and wrote, "Mission Majnu isn’t as crudely jingoistic as something like Bhuj: The Pride of India. The film also does not comment on the moral implications of nuclear proliferation; for that, you will have to see the pilot of Rocket Boys."
