= Mere Desh Ki Dharti (film) =

- Theatrical release poster
- Directed by: Faraz Haider
- Written by: Piyush Mishra (dialogues)
- Screenplay by: Faraz Haider
- Story by: Neel Chakraborty
- Produced by: Vaishali Sarwankar
- Starring: Divyenndu Sharma; Anant Vidhaat; Anupriya Goenka; Inaamulhaq; Brijendra Kala; Rajesh Sharma; Atul Shrivastava; Farrukh Jaffar; Avantika Khattri
- Cinematography: Hari K. Vedantam
- Edited by: Pratik Chitalia
- Music by: Vikram Montrose
- Production company: Carnival Motion Pictures
- Release dates: January 2022 (JIFF); 6 May 2022
- Running time: 122 minutes
- Country: India
- Language: Hindi

Mere Desh Ki Dharti (transl. The land of my country) is a 2022 Indian Hindi-language drama film directed by Faraz Haider and produced by Vaishali Sarwankar under the banner of Carnival Motion Pictures. The film has an ensemble cast of Divyenndu Sharma, Anant Vidhaat, Anupriya Goenka and Inaamulhaq. The film revolves around two engineers and their transforming journey in life. The film also portrays the harsh realities of farmers in the villages of India.

The concept of Mere Desh Ki Dharti was devised by Dr. Shrikant Bhasi, and the story and screenplay were then written by Neel Chakraborty and Faraz Haider respectively while Piyush Mishra has written the dialogue. The film was scheduled to be released theatrically on 14 August 2020, but was postponed due to the COVID-19 pandemic. Other cast members include Brijendra Kala, Rajesh Sharma, Atul Shrivastava, and Farrukh Jaffar. The film premiered at the 2022 Jaipur International Film Festival, where it won 2nd Best Film. It was theatrically released on 6 May 2022.

== Plot ==
A young engineer, Ajay, goes to rural India with his friend Sameer after facing setbacks in his career. Almost on the verge of committing suicide, the two end up going to a village where they see the struggle of farmers and feel they should work in the farming sector. Against a lot of challenges, especially against rate-fixing agents and intermediate buyers, the two go on to revolutionise the farming sector in the region by using all the available technologies and facilities provided by the government and a lot of self-innovation.

== Cast ==
- Divyenndu Sharma as Ajay
- Anant Vidhaat Sharma as Sameer
- Anupriya Goenka as Jhumki
- Chandresh Shukla as Astrologer
- Inaamulhaq as Pappan Khan
- Brijendra Kala as Dubey Ji
- Rajesh Sharma as Kishanlal
- Avantika Khattri as Priyanka Khurrana
- Atul Shrivastava as Ajay's father
- Farrukh Jaffar as Daadi
- Rutuja Shinde as Shilpa
- Dalip Tahil as Shilpa's father
- Manu Rishi Chadha as Billu
- Imran Rasheed as Ramdas
- Kamlesh Sawant as Bhau
- Scarlett Wilson as Special appearance
- Neel Chakraborty as Gautam

== Production ==
=== Filming ===
Mere Desh Ki Dharti was formally launched in 2020. Principal photography of the film began in January 2020 in Bhopal, Madhya Pradesh. Filming was wrapped up in March 2020. Most of the scenes were shot in the Sehore district of Bhopal in January followed by Mumbai, Maharashtra in February and March.

== Soundtrack ==
The music of the film is composed by Vikram Montrose and the title song has been sung by Sukhwinder Singh.

Track listing
| No. | Title | Singer(s) | Length |
|---|---|---|---|
| 1. | "Mere Desh Ki Dharti (Title Track)" | Sukhwinder Singh | 3:23 |
| 2. | "Tip Top" | Supriyaa Pathak, Farhad Bhiwandiwala | 2:23 |
| 3. | "Khudaya Re" | Ali Aslam Shah | 2:37 |

== Release ==
Earlier, the film was slated to release on 14 August 2020, but was postponed due to the COVID-19. Now the movie is releasing in theaters on 6 May 2022.
