= Alif (2016 film) =

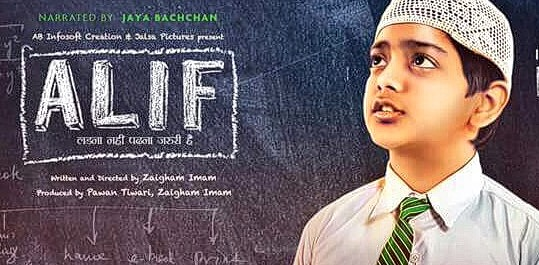
- Directed by: Zaigham Imam
- Written by: Zaigham Imam
- Produced by: Pawan Tiwari; Zaigham Imam
- Starring: Neelima Azeem; Danish Hussain; Saud Mansuri; Bhavna Pani; Pawan Tiwari; Aditya Om
- Cinematography: Dipak Nayak
- Edited by: Prakash Jha
- Music by: Aman Pant
- Production companies: AB Infosoft; JALSA Pictures
- Distributed by: Shiladitya Bora
- Release dates: November 2016 (Queensland); 3 February 2017
- Country: India
- Language: Hindi

Alif is a 2016 Indian Hindi film jointly produced by Pawan Tiwari and Zaigham Imam, who also directed the film. The trailer of the film was launched by Uttar Pradesh Chief Minister Akhilesh Yadav and Jaya Bachchan on 27 December 2016. It stars Neelima Azeem, Bhavna Pani, Pawan Tiwari, Danish Hussain, Aditya Om, Saud Mansuri, Shimala Prasad as the lead characters.

Alif deals with the importance of modern education. The narrator of the film is veteran actress Jaya Bachchan.

== Plot ==
A Muslim boy tries to adapt to the convent school culture. The tale is about the ordeals and hostilities that he faces.

== Cast ==
- Neelima Azeem as Zeher Raza
- Danish Husain as Mohammad Raza
- Bhavna Pani
- Pawan Tiwari
- Aditya Om as Jamal
- Mohammed Saud Mansuri as Ali Raza
- Shimala Prasad
- Gauri Shanker
- Ishaan

== Festivals ==
Alif premièred in the Indian International Film Festival of Queensland, Australia in November 2016. It also won the Best Screenplay and Best Child Artist award at the Bioscope Global Film Festival.
