= Inaamulhaq =

Indian actor and screenwriter (born 1979)

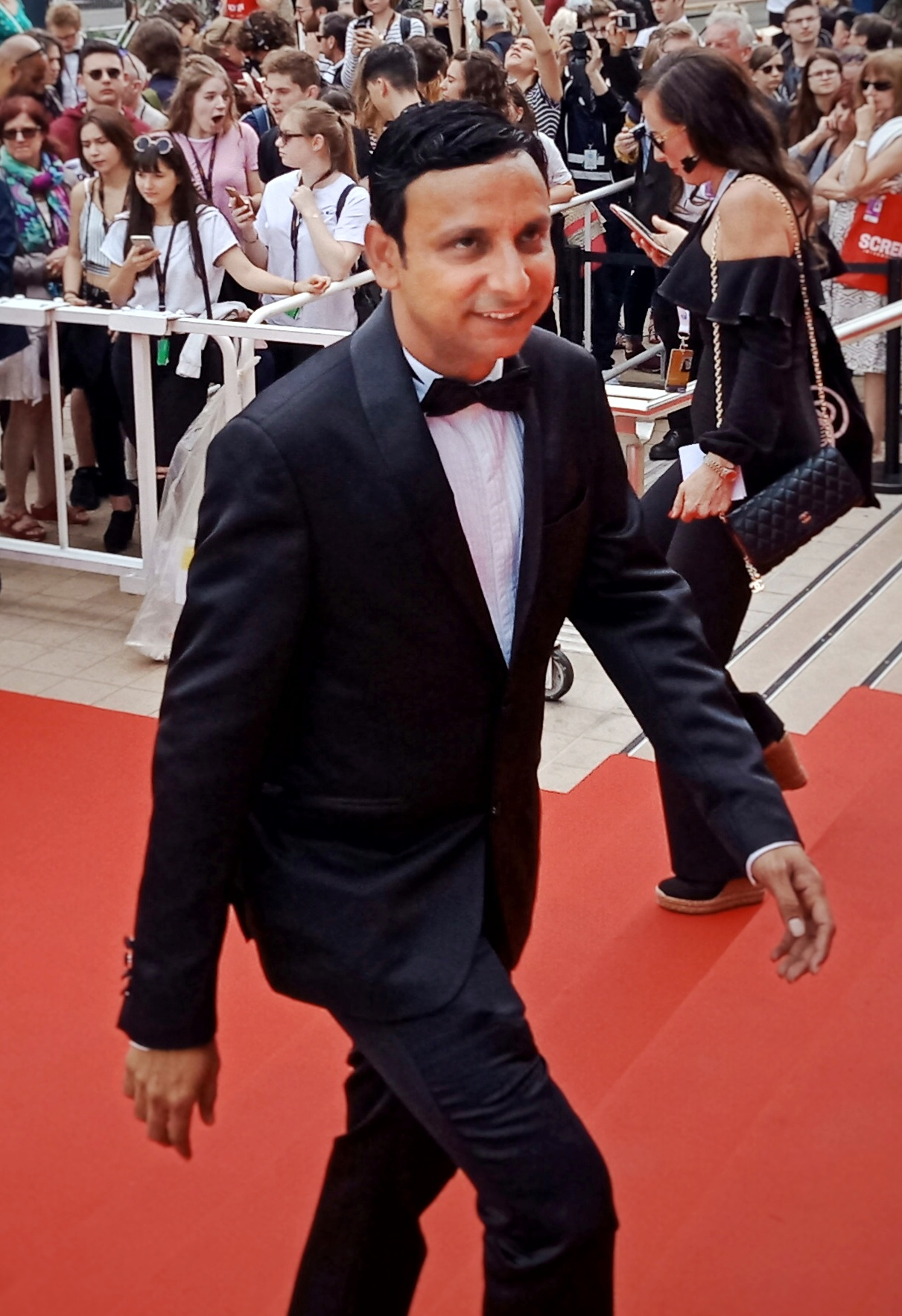
- Inaamulhaq at Cannes Film Festival 2018
- Born: 14 November 1979 (age 46); Saharanpur, Uttar Pradesh, India
- Education: National School of Drama
- Occupations: Actor; screenwriter
- Spouse: Shibli Anwer
- Website: inaamulhaq.com

Inaamulhaq (born 14 November 1979) is an Indian actor and screenwriter who has been part of several Bollywood films, including Filmistaan, Jolly LLB 2 and Airlift. In 2019 Inaamulhaq has bagged the Best Actor Award at the DCSAFF (Washington DC South Asian Film Festival) for his performance in his film Nakkash. and Best Actor Award at India International Film Festival of Boston (IIFFB) 2019.

He has written for TV shows including Comedy Circus and dialogue for the Hindi film Bbuddah... Hoga Terra Baap.

== Early life and education ==
Born in Saharanpur (Uttar Pradesh, India), Inaamulhaq first appeared on stage at the age of twelve. Later, he joined the Indian People's Theatre Association (IPTA) in Saharanpur, and acted in numerous plays as a lead. In 2003, he graduated from the National School of Drama (NSD) New Delhi, with specialisation in acting.

== Career ==
In Mumbai he started his career as a writer for season 2 of Karamchand, directed by Pankaj Parashar.

After working as a scriptwriter and creative consultant with Comedy Circus for two and a half years, he moved into films and wrote dialogue for Bbuddah... Hoga Terra Baap in 2011.

As an actor, he got his first film break with the critically acclaimed Firaaq in 2008. His first major role in a feature film was as the Pakistani national Aaftab, in Nitin Kakkar's National Award winner Filmistaan (2012), for which he was named in the "Top 10 Stand-Out Actors of 2014" by Mid-Day, and "The Most Prominent Debuts of 2014" by IBNlive.com in their Year-ender 2014. He is also listed in IMDB'S Top 200 Best Indian Actors and Actresses. Madhureeta Mukherjee from Times of India wrote: "Inaamulhaq piques the emotions with perfection. The camaraderie between the pure souls who understand only the language of Bollywood is heart-warming". Shubha Shetty-Saha from Mid-Day praised him saying: "But it is Inaamulhaq, who steals your heart with the most natural, endearing performance".

Inaamulhaq appeared in the Askhay Kumar-starrer Airlift. He plays the role of an Iraqi Major Kahalf Bin Zayd, who is the main antagonist of the evacuation that the film is based on. Airlift is one of the biggest success of the actor and his performance in Airlift received a positive review from the critics. 'Airlift was released 22 January 2016. Bollywood Hungama praised him in their review saying: "Inaamulhaq as the Amitabh Bachchan fan Iraqi Major Khalaf Bin Zayd is a delight". Critic Komal Nahta from ETC Bollywood Business stated in his review: "Inaamulhaq is entertaining as the Iraqi major".

His played a cameo in Jolly LLB 2 as a Kashmiri. Mentioning about Inaamulhaq's performance in Jolly LLB-2 review, Sudhir Redkar from KoiMoi.com wrote: "Inaamulhaq has a small cameo that turns out to be an interesting twist". Anna MM Vetticad from FirstPost.com wrote: "Watch Inaamulhaq playing a Kashmiri pronounce "card" differently within a span of a few seconds". He also appeared in Lucknow Central and Firangi and Phullu in and was praised for his performance. Sukanya Verma from Rediff.com praised Inaamulhaq's performance in Phullu quoting "No wonder a brief cameo by Inaamulhaq, once again reiterating his appeal in showy, idiosyncratic characters, makes more sense that most of this movie".

Inaamulhaq's film Nakkash was released on limited screens on 31 May 2019, in which he played the lead role. The first look poster of Nakkash was unveiled at India Pavilion of the Cannes Film Festival 2018. Pallabi Dey Purkayastha wrote in her The Times of India review "The protagonist, played by Inaamulhaq, is a revelation and his chemistry with his on-screen son almost evokes a sense of resentment towards the society we live in, mainly because of the unfair treatment that they are subjected to". Saibal Chatterjee from NDTV quotes "Inaamulhaq does full justice to his first-ever lead role in a Hindi film, getting into the skin of the conflicted central character with complete conviction".

For his performance in Nakkash Inaamulhaq bagged the Best Actor Award at the 8th Annual DCSAFF (Washington DC South Asian Film Festival 2018) . and Best Actor Award at India International Film Festival of Boston (IIFFB) 2019.

Inaamulhaq was seen in Nikkhil Advani's web series Hasmukh produced by Applause Entertainment. currently streaming on Netflix.

He also appeared in Maharani (web series) as Bengali bureaucrat Parvez Aalam. Where he got great reception from the audience and critics as well. The show is created by Subhash Kapoor and streaming on SonyLIV

== Personal life ==
Inaamulhaq is married to Shibli Anwer. The couple have a son Ivaan.

== Filmography ==
=== Actor ===
- Firaaq (2008) as Munna
- Agneepath (2012) as villager
- Filmistaan (2012) as Aftaab
- Chidiya (2016) as Taj (cameo)
- Airlift (2016) as Major Khalaf Bin Zayd
- Jolly LLB 2 (2017) as Mohammed Iqbal Quadri
- Phullu (2017) (cameo)
- Lucknow Central (2017) as Dikkat Ansari
- Firangi (2017) as Heera
- Nakkash (2019) as Allah Rakha Siddiqui
- Pagalpanti (2019) as Niraj Modi
- Hasmukh (Web-Series) (2020) as Daroga
- Maharani (web series) (2021) as Bihar Finance Secretary, Parvez Aalam
- Mere Desh Ki Dharti (2022) as Pappan Khan
- Zara Hatke Zara Bachke (2023) as Bhagwan Das
- Pippa (2023) as Shibli
- Welcome to the Jungle (2026)

=== Writer ===
- Bbuddah... Hoga Terra Baap (2011) (dialogue writer)
- Screwed Up (Web Series) (2018) (additional dialogue writer).

== Awards ==
Won

- Best Actor Award for Nakkash at IIFFB (India International Film Festival Of Boston 2019)
- Best Actor Award for Nakkash at DCSAFF (Washington DC South Asian Film Festival 2018)
- Jury Award for outstanding performance in Nakkash at Lifft India Filmotsav-World Cine Fest 2019
- Best Actor in a Supporting Role for Filmistaan at 21st Annual Screen Awards
- Best Actor in a Supporting Role for Filmistaan at IBNLive Movie Awards (2015)
- Best Actor in a Supporting Role for Filmistaan at SICA Awards (2015)
- Best Actor in a Supporting Role for Filmistaan at AIBA Awards (2015)

Nominated

- Best Actor in a Supporting Role for Filmistaan at IIFA Awards 2015

== Short films ==
Inaamulhaq directed two short films – "The Search" (2005) which got nominated for the Best Film Award in competition category at Berlin Asia-Pacific Film Festival-2006 (Germany), and "Parchhaiyaan" (2004), based on an anti-War poem by renowned poet Sahir Ludhianvi.

== Television ==
| Year | Show | Credit | Broadcaster |
|---|---|---|---|
| 2007 | Karamchand – Season 2 | Writer | Sony |
| 2007 | Comedy Circus – Season 1 | Writer/Associate Content Director | Sony |
| 2007 | Comedy Circus – Lage Raho | Writer/Associate Content Director | Sony |
| 2008 | Comedy Circus 2 | Writer/Associate Content Director | Sony |
| 2008 | Comedy Honours | Writer | STAR Gold |
| 2008 | Comedy Circus – Kante Ki Takkar | Writer/Associate Content Director | Sony |
| 2008 | Filmfare Fever | Writer | Sony |
| 2008 | Sabse Favourite Koun? | Writer | STAR Gold |
| 2008 | Arre Deewano Mujhe Pehchano | Content Director | STAR Plus |
| 2009 | Comedy Circus – Chinchpokli to China | Associate Content Director | Sony |
| 2009 | Comedy Circus – 20–20 | Associate Content Director | Sony |
| 2009 | Kaho Na Yaar Hai | Associate Creative Director | STAR Plus |
| 2009 | Comedy Circus – Dekh India Dekh | Associate Content Director | Sony |
| 2009 | Comedy Circus 3 – Ka Tadka | Associate Content Director | Sony |
| 2010 | Comedy Circus – MahaSangram | Associate Content Director | Sony |
| 2010 | Chhote Ustaad – 2 | Writer | STAR Plus |
| 2011 | Dekh Video Dekh | Writer | Colors |
| 2011 | Comedy Ka Maha Muqabala | Act Producer | STAR Plus |
| 2013 | Nautanki-The Comedy Theatre | Associate Creative Director | Colors |
| 2014 | Yam Kisi Se Kam Nahi | Writer | EPIC |
| 2015 | Goldie Ahuja Matric Pass | Writer | DISNEY |

== Theatre ==
(In alphabetical order)

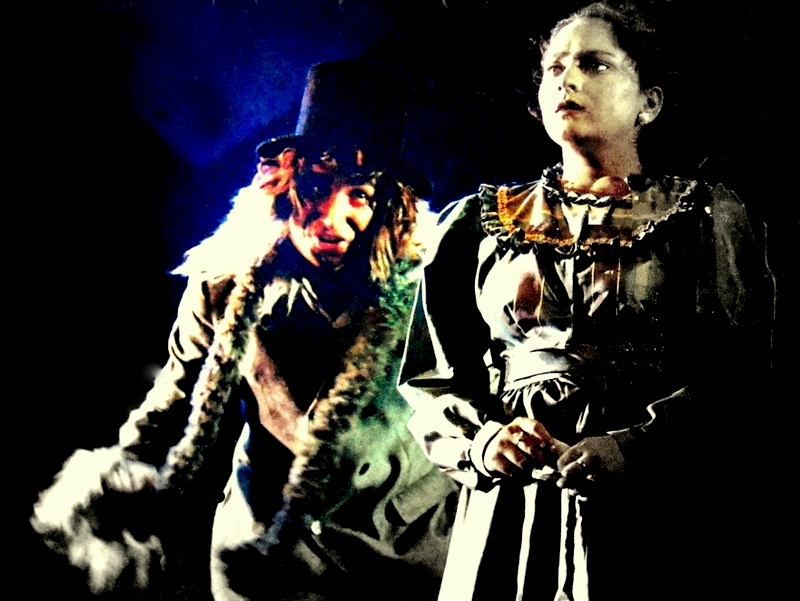
Inaamulhaq as Nils Krogstad in Henrik Ibsen's A Doll's House with NSD batch-mate Shiromani Kaushik.

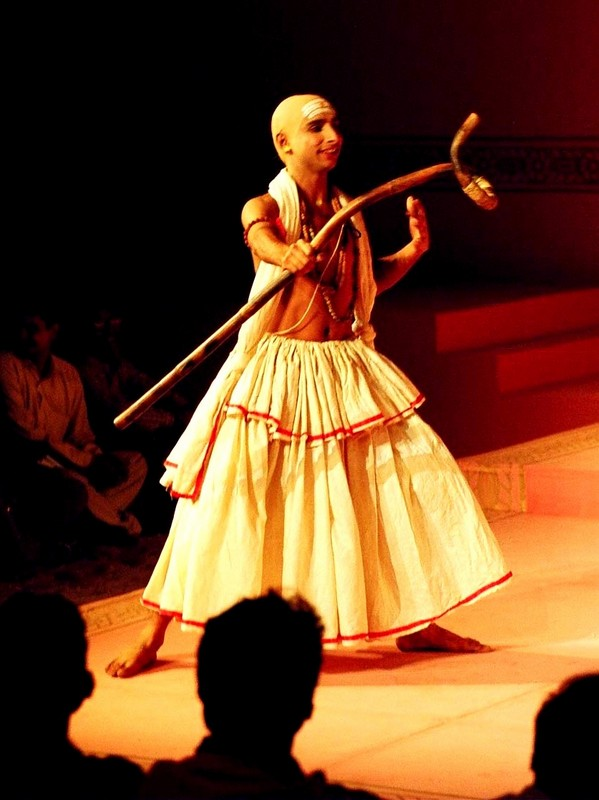
Inaamulhaq as Madhavye (Vidushak) in Kalidasa's Abhijñānaśākuntalam

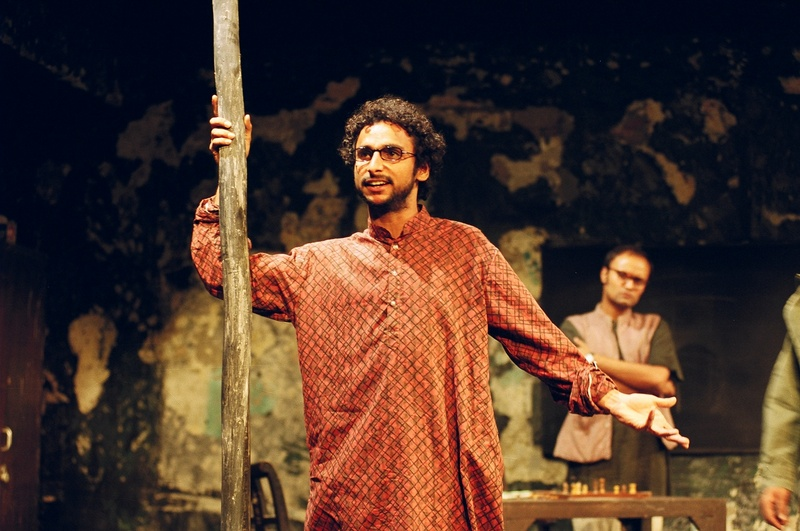
Inaamulhaq as Ivan Kaliayev in Albert Camus's The Just Assassins

| Play | Character | Written By | Produced by |
|---|---|---|---|
| A Doll's House | Nils Krogstad | Henrik Ibsen | NSD |
| Abhijñānaśākuntalam | Madhavye (Vidushak) | Kalidasa | NSD |
| Acchhe Aadmi | Batasu | Phanishwar Nath 'Renu' | NSD |
| Andha Yug | Kripacharya | Dharamvir Bharati | SARGAM-A |
| Arey Shareef Log | Dr. Ghatak | Jaywant Dalvi | IPTA |
| Bade Bhai Sahab | Narrator | Munshi Premchand | IPTA |
| Ek Ladki Paanch Deewane | Solo | Harishankar Parsai | IPTA |
| Ek Tha Gadha urf Aladad Khan | Chintak-1 | Sharad Joshi | IPTA |
| Hanoosh | Tober/Officer-Two | Bhisham Sahni | BNA/NSD |
| Inspector Matadeen Chand Par | Matadeen | Harishankar Parsai | BNA/NSD |
| Julius Caesar | Various Characters | William Shakespeare | NSD |
| Kabuli Wala | Narrator | Rabindranath Tagore | NSD |
| King Lear | Edgar | William Shakespeare | NSD |
| Kiska Haath | ChetuRam | Satish De | ADACAAR |
| Ladai | Various Character | Sarveshwar Dayal Saxena | NATYA |
| Panchhi Aise Aate Hain | Anna Paradker | Vijay Tendulkar | NAVANKUR |
| Rasik Sampadak | Sampadak Chokhelal | Munshi Premchand | IPTA |
| Saint Joan | Dauphin, Charles VII | George Bernard Shaw | NSD |
| The Nose | Ivan Yakovlevich | Nikolai Gogol | IPTA |
| Shanichar Ka Chakkar | Various Character | Improvised | IPTA/ITC |
| Singhasan Khali Hai | Teen | Sushil Kumar Singh | IPTA |
| Tajmahal Ka Tender | Shahjahan | Ajay Shukla | IPTA |
| Thank You Mr. Glad | Various Characters | Anil Berve | SARGAM-A |
| The Frogs | Euripides | Aristophanes | NSD |
| The Illusion | Alcandre, A Magician | Tony Kushner | NSD |
| The Just Assassins | Ivan Kaliayev | Albert Camus | NSD |
| The Obsession | Various Characters | Improvised | IPTA |
| Kheench Rahe Hain | Various Character | Ravi Deep | IPTA |
| Tinka-Tinka | Various Characters | Improvised | NSD |
| Yahudi Ki Larki | Azra | Agha Hashar Kashmiri | NSD |
