= Filmistaan =

- Official film poster
- Directed by: Nitin Kakkar
- Screenplay by: Nitin Kakkar
- Dialogues by: Abhinav Garg
- Story by: Nitin Kakkar
- Produced by: Shyam Shroff; Balkrishna Shroff; Subhash Chaudary; Shaila Tanna; Siddharth Roy Kapur
- Starring: Sharib Hashmi; Inaamulhaq; Kumud Mishra; Gopal Dutt
- Cinematography: Subhransu Das
- Edited by: Sachindra Vats
- Music by: Arijit Datta
- Production company: Satellite Pictures
- Distributed by: UTV Motion Pictures
- Release dates: 17 October 2012 (Busan International Film Festival); 6 June 2014 (India)
- Running time: 117 minutes
- Country: India
- Language: Hindi
- Budget: ₹7.50 crore
- Box office: ₹9.99 crore

Filmistaan (transl. The land of films) is a 2012 Indian Hindi-language film written and directed by Nitin Kakkar.

It was screened at the 17th Busan International Film Festival, the Mumbai Film Festival, and the International Film Festival of Kerala, where it won the Silver Crow Pheasant Award for best debut. It won the Best Feature Film in Hindi at the 60th National Film Awards 2012. Filmistaan was screened internationally at the 24th Palm Springs International Film Festival, the 23rd Tromsø International Film Festival, the 36th Göteborg International Film Festival, and the 5th Jaipur International Film Festival. It was released nationwide across India on 6 June 2014.

== Plot ==
In Mumbai, a wannabe actor Sukhwinder ("Sunny"), who works as an assistant director, fantasizes on becoming a star. However, at every audition he is thrown out. Undeterred, he goes with an American crew to remote areas in Rajasthan to work on a documentary. While filming near the India-Pakistan border, the crew encounters Indian police officers patrolling the area. After the American director unsuccessfully argues that he has obtained official permission to film in Rajasthan, Sunny entertains the chief officer and plays to his desire to be exalted and filmed. Impressed and in a happy mood, the officer allows the crew to continue their work.

Later in the night, as Sunny is busy changing the tire of his car, the rest of the crew leaves in another vehicle. On his drive back, he encounters a cyclist lying on the road and checks him out, but soon realizes from the shadows that it's a ruse. A terrorist Muslim Jihadist group kidnaps him and brings him and his camera equipment to Pakistan. The group leader is disappointed that their original plan to kidnap an American crew-member didn't occur. He says that holding an American hostage would force the government to meet his demands to avoid international backlash, but an Indian hostage would be worthless. He instructs Mehmood and Jawaad to keep him hostage in a village while the others attempt another kidnapping.

Sunny wakes up to find himself in an unfamiliar house. He demands to be let go, but after Mehmood gives him the opportunity to walk out, he stays realizing they will kill him if he did. The house where he is confined belongs to Aftaab, a Pakistani Muslim whose trade stems from pirated Hindi films, which he brings back every time he crosses the border. Aftaab gets enamored by Sunny's camera equipment as he too loves movies. Aftaab plays Sunny's favorite film Maine Pyaar Kiya for the villagers to watch. Sunny wants to watch it too, but Mehmood doesn't allow him to leave. Sunny loudly mimics the dialogues of the film in his room and this forces Mehmood to let him join the villagers and watch it. As Sunny helps fill in for the muted dialog of the film, Aftaab starts forging a bond with him.

A few days later, a messenger of the group leader arrives with a digital camera and the leader's demand for a hostage video. As none of the group members knows how to operate the camera, Sunny steps in and offers to direct the shot himself. He does several takes as he is repeatedly disappointed with each take and attempting to do better in the next. At first he tried shots with just himself, then with two gunmen pointing guns at him, and finally with Mehmood making the demand himself on-camera. Satisfied with the last take with Mehmood, they return to the village and send off the messenger with the video.

One day while Jawaad is taking a shower, Sunny walks around the area and picks up his gun. He gathers the village children and entertains them with mimicry of how Bollywood actors would shoot their guns. Mehmood and Jawaad sneak up on him thinking he is attempting to escape. Though Mehmood has a clear shot to kill Sunny, he realizes that Sunny is just entertaining the kids but shoots a bullet to graze Sunny's arm to teach him a lesson. The physician who cleaned up the wound and gave Sunny medicines talks about his desire to visit Amritsar as he used to before the partition of India and Pakistan. Sunny tells him that he reminds him of his grandfather who also wanted to visit Lahore as he once could.

After learning that India is playing against Pakistan in a cricket match, Sunny makes a deal with Mehmood that he would allow him to leave if India wins. The villagers gathered around a truck's radio to hear the match. Though it appeared that Pakistan had a chance, India wins with a six-run hit. Sunny is thrilled and starts dancing, much to the dismay of the villagers. But soon Mehmood is enraged and attempts to destroy his camera equipment. Sunny holds on to the camera to prevent Mehmood from destroying it, and gets slapped hard several times before Jawaad stepped in and stopped him.

The Pakistani border patrol arrives at the village, causing Mehmood to suspect that Aftaab had tipped them off. However, Aftaab convinces them that they are just patrolling and gets them to hide. Sunny tries to make himself known to the patrol, but Aftaab tells him that he would either be killed as an Indian spy or put in prison. Aftaab entertains the patrol officers, gives some pirated DVDs to the chief officer and sends them off. Mehmood gains more trust in Aftaab, while Aftaab grows closer to Sunny and they share their passion for Bollywood movies. Aftaab hopes that Pakistan's Lollywood would also make similar blockbuster movies that Bollywood wants to copy, instead of the B-movies it currently makes.

Aftaab promises to help Sunny escape with his knowledge of the border. They devise a plan where they will invite men of the village to audition for a movie. While shooting a scene for the movie, they enact an escape scene together, raising suspicion of Mehmood but soon dispelling it when they returned. After the scenes were shot, the villages including some women in black burqa are leaving. Jawaad finds a watch in the sand and returns it to one of the villagers. But later he realizes it is Sunny's watch and Sunny had escaped in a burqa.

Aftaab and Sunny attempt to escape on a motorbike but are soon stopped by Mehmood. He locks both of them up after Aftaab promises to help Sunny escape as long as he is alive, and questions why people like Mehmood are destroying Pakistan in the name of Allah. When the terrorist group leader arrives at the village, Aftaab's father pleads with him to let Sunny go. He reluctantly agrees realizing that the village could turn against them if he didn't oblige.

Mehmood and Jawaad bring Aftaab and Sunny to a barren land near the border. Mehmood stops the vehicle and claiming that he has orders, he prepares to kill Aftaab and Sunny. However, Jawaad disbelieving him points his gun at Mehmood. After a verbal argument between the two, Mehmood swings his gun to shoot Jawaad but is shot down and falls dead. Jawaad tells both Sunny and Aftaab to escape, saying Aftaab would be killed in Pakistan as a traitor. The group leader soon arrives and kills a desolate Jawaad who was waiting on his knees for his fate.

Sunny and Aftaab wait near the border for the patrol officers to leave, then start running towards the border. The group leader and his assistant catch up with them and start shooting at them. When they hide out behind a grass-patch, Aftaab urges Sunny to escape while he holds them off, but Sunny refuses to leave without him. They again run towards the border while bullets were fired at them but missed, with the interlaced public dialogues of Mohammed Ali Jinnah and Jawaharlal Nehru in the background. The film closes with them crossing the border milestone and Aftaab turning around to shoot back at the terrorists.

== Cast ==
- Sharib Hashmi as Sukhwinder Arora alias Sunny
- Inaamulhaq as Aftaab
- Kumud Mishra as Mehmood
- Gopal Datt as Jawwad

== Production ==
The Pakistani village depicted is actually Beermanna village situated in Rajasthan, India. The film was declared tax free in Maharashtra due to the idea of binding the countries of India and Pakistan. The 1987 Soviet film A Man from the Boulevard des Capucines directed by Alla Surikova has a similar theme.

== Awards ==
Filmistaan won the National Film Award for Best Feature Film in Hindi at 60th National Film Awards.
