= Piya Ka Ghar Pyaara Lage =

- Genre: Drama
- Written by: Rajendra Mehra, Soham Abhiram
- Directed by: Sunil Prasad, Rajesh Gupta, & Amitabh Sinha
- Starring: See below
- Composer: Pankaj Pushkar
- Country of origin: India
- Original language: Hindi
- No. of seasons: 2

Production
- Executive producers: Ayub Khan; Rimita Walia
- Producers: Ankur Joshi; Kamlesh Bhanushali
- Production location: Mumbai
- Editor: Asif Israr Khan
- Camera setup: Multi-camera
- Running time: Approx. 24 minutes

Original release
- Network: Sahara One
- Release: 10 November 2011 – 27 September 2013

Related
- Hi! Padosi... Kaun Hai Doshi?

Piya Ka Ghar Pyaara Lage is an Indian television series that was broadcast on Sahara One. The series ran for two years, from 2011 to 2013.

Sanjeeda Sheikh starred as the female lead Sejal. After Sanjeeda left the show, Leena Jumani became the new female lead, in the role of Piya. The show ended in September 2013, weeks after the male lead Giriraj Kabra was abruptly replaced by Raj Singh.

== Plot ==
The series revolves around Sejal (Sanjeeda Sheikh) who goes through struggles with her husband Bittu (Giriraj Kabra / Raj Singh).

== Cast ==
- Sanjeeda Sheikh as Sejal Mehta
- Giriraj Kabra / Raj Singh as Bittu
- Leena Jumani as Piya Nanavati
- Neelu Kohli as Rano Mehta
- Govind Khatri as Harbans Lal Mehta
- Abhay Harpade as Naveen Nanavati (Piya Father)
- Reshmi Ghosh / Bharti Sharma as Urmila
- Mugdha Shah as Sejal Mother
- Aditi Sajwan / Shalini Sahuta as Roop
- Khusboo Kamal as Pinky Malhotra
- Shivani Gosain as Banto Malhotra
- Amit Pachori as Angad (Urmila's husband)
- Bharat Chawda as Pappu (Bittu's cousin)
- Pawan Tiwari as Prakash (Bittu's friend)
- Usha Bachani as Mrs. Nanavati
- Simmy Solanki as Ms. Nanavati (Piya Sister)
- Prakash Ramchandani as Advocate
- Jhumma Mitra as Mrs. Joshi neighbour
