= Anupriya Goenka =

Indian actress and model (b. 1987)

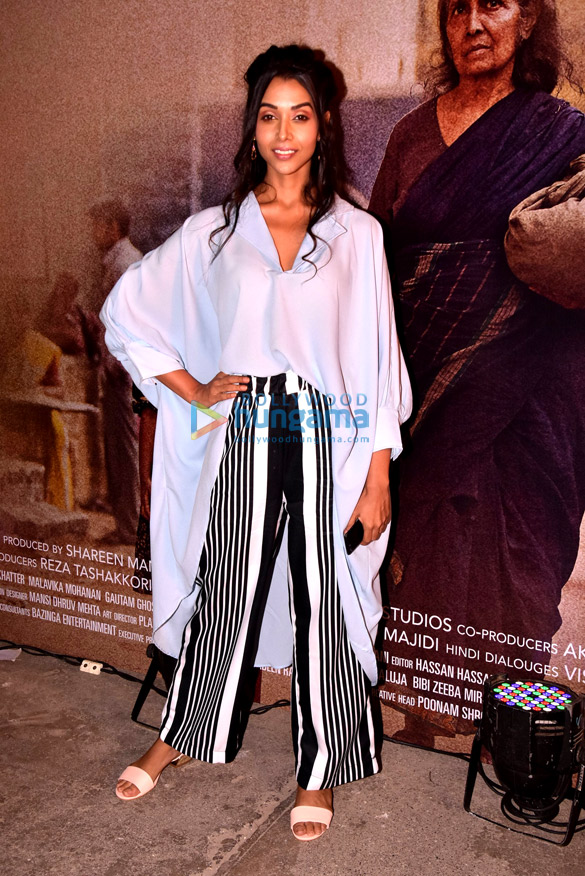
- Goenka in 2019
- Born: 29 May 1987 (age 39); Kanpur, Uttar Pradesh, India
- Occupations: Actress; model
- Years active: 2013–present

Anupriya Goenka (born 29 May 1987) is an Indian actress and model who appears in Hindi and Telugu films. She first shot to fame in 2013 as the face of UPA government's Bharat Nirman. Goenka made her on-screen debut with the 2013 Telugu film Potugadu, having previously starred in the 2013 short film Worth the Kiss. She made her Bollywood debut with Bobby Jasoos.

She subsequently starred in the comedy-drama Bobby Jasoos (2014), the drama Paathshala (2014), the action comedy Dishoom (2016), and the crime-drama Daddy (2017). Goenka went on to star in the action-thrillers Tiger Zinda Hai (2017) and War (2019), and the epic period drama Padmaavat (2018).

She made her web debut with Stories by Rabindranath Tagore and went onto appear in successful series like Sacred Games, Abhay, Criminal Justice, Asur: Welcome to Your Dark Side, Aashram, and Criminal Justice: Behind Closed Doors.

== Early life ==
Anupriya Goenka was born in a Marwadi Family on 29 May 1987 in Kanpur, Uttar Pradesh to Ravindra Kumar Goenka, a garment entrepreneur and Pushpa Goenka, a homemaker.

Goenka also worked in her family business before she completed school. She said, "I was the enterprising one and started helping my father in the garment export business. Acting was always a hobby till I realized I couldn't do justice to both theatre and my corporate career," she said.

== Career ==
Goenka moved to Mumbai in 2009. Goenka was intrigued with theater and tried to juggle between a career in acting and the corporate sector. She started doing commercials and first became known in 2013 as the face of UPA government's Bharat Nirman ad campaign and for playing a lesbian character in India's first ever lesbian ad for the brand Myntra in 2015. Goenka has appeared in various television commercials for brands including Coke, Garnier, Stayfree, Kotak Mahindra Bank, Pepperfry, and Vodafone. She also worked as an Anchor / Show Host in a Home Shopping Channel called ShopCJ for more than one year. She portrayed the role of nurse Poorna in the 2017 action-thriller Tiger Zinda Hai. She garnered critical acclaim for the portrayal of the role of Queen Nagmati in the 2018 epic film Padmaavat opposite Shahid Kapoor.

== Media ==
Goenka was ranked in The Times Most Desirable Women at No. 8 in 2020.

== Filmography ==
Key
†	Denotes films that have not yet been released

=== Films ===
Year	Title	Role	Notes
2013	Potugadu	Mary	Telugu film
2014	Bobby Jasoos	Afreen	
2014	Paathasala	Sandhya	Telugu film
2016	Dishoom	Alishka Iyer	
2017	Vekh Baraatan Challiyan	Saroj	Punjabi film; special appearance
2017	Daddy	Hilda	
2017	Tiger Zinda Hai	Poorna	
2018	Sir	Ankita	
2018	Padmaavat	Nagmati	
2019	War	Aditi	
2019	Kissebaaz	Naina	
2022	Mere Desh Ki Dharti	Jhumki	
2024	Berlin		

=== Television ===
Year	Title	Role	Notes
2015	Stories by Rabindranath Tagore	Mrignoyonee	Story "Kankaal"
2018–2019	Sacred Games	Megha Singh	Netflix Original series
2019	The Final Call	Parineeta "Pari"	ZEE5 Original series
2019	Abhay	Supriya (cameo appearance)	ZEE5 Original series
2019	Criminal Justice	Nikhat Hussain	Hotstar Specials series
2019	Panchali	Bhoomi	
2019	Fuh se Fantasy	Mr. Mehra	Voot Original Series Ep. Not Vanilla
2020–present	Asur	Naina	Voot Select original series, JioCinema
2020	Aashram	Dr. Natasha	MX Original series
2020	Criminal Justice: Behind Closed Doors	Nikhat Hussain	Hotstar Specials series
2021	Crime Next Door	Sujata	Hotstar Specials series
2023	Sultan of Delhi	Shankari Devi	Disney+Hotstar
2024	Khoj - Parchaiyo Ke Uss Paar	Meera	ZEE5 Original series
