= Nakkash =

Hindi film

- Directed by: Zaigham Imam
- Written by: Zaigham Imam
- Produced by: Pawan Tiwari; Govind Goyal; Zaigham Imam
- Starring: Inaamulhaq; Sharib Hashmi; Pawan Tiwari; Kumud Mishra; Rajesh Sharma (actor); Gulki Joshi
- Cinematography: Asit Biswas
- Edited by: Prakash Jha
- Music by: Aman Pant
- Production companies: Jalsa Pictures; AB Infosoft Creation; Padmaja Productions
- Distributed by: Golden Ratio Films
- Release date: 31 May 2019
- Running time: 104 minutes
- Country: India
- Language: Hindi

Nakkash (transl. The Craftsman) is a 2019 Hindi language film written and directed by Zaigham Imam, and produced by Pawan Tiwari’s Jalsa Pictures and Imam's AB Infosoft Creations in association with Padmaja Productions. Nakkash stars Inaamulhaq Sharib Hashmi and Kumud Mishra along with Rajesh Sharma.

Nakkash was premiered at DCSAFF (Washington DC South Asian Film Festival) where the lead actor Inaamulhaq won the Best Actor Award for outstanding performance in "Nakkash". It was also screened at SgSaiff (Singapore South Asian International Film Festival) where Imam won the Emerging Filmmaker of the Year award.

The first look poster of Nakkash was unveiled in Indian Pavilion at the Cannes Film Festival in 2018.

== Main Cast ==
- Inaamulhaq as Alla Rakkha Siddiqui
- Sharib Hashmi as Samad
- Kumud Mishra as Bhagwandas Vedanti
- Rajesh Sharma as Inspector
- Gulki Joshi as Sabia Bano
- Pawan Tiwari as Munna Bhaiya
- Harminder Singh Alag as Mohammad
- Anil Rastogi as Politician
- Siddharth Bhardwaj as Chand Miyan
- Shobhna Bhardwaj as Samina
- Simala Prasad as Journalist

== Production ==
Inspired by the real life characters based in Varanasi, the entire film was filmed at the real locations in Varanasi in November 2017.

== Awards ==
- Inaamulhaq won 'Best Actor Award' at the DCSAFF (Washington DC South Asian Film Festival) 2108, for outstanding performance in "Nakkash.
- Zaigham Imam won Emerging Filmmaker of the Year award at SgSAIFF (Singapore South Asian International Film Festival) 2018.

== Unique Promotion ==
Being an independent film, and due to limitations of promotional budget the cast of Nakkash held Cycle-Yatra through the Mumbai city’s teeming thoroughfares to spread love and peace in the Mumbaikers. Inspired by the infamous Juhu Cirlce Baba’s quote ‘Apne Dharam Per Chalo, Sabse Pyaar Karo’, Nakkash team started their Cycle-Yatra from Juhu Circle and reached Juhu Chowpati, where they became the "Human-Hoarding" to grab the people and media's attention. In his Media interaction during the campaign the lead actor Inaamulhaq, said that he feels that the idea of becoming a human hoarding was far better way than the hoarding on a pole. He believes that it was taken in a very positive way by the people as they had a yearning to ask questions about it, which spread the idea of peace between people, which is the central idea of Nakkash and that is why it is very crucial that the film like this reaches the viewers and teach the people of the country the way of love and accord between each other.

== Critical reception ==
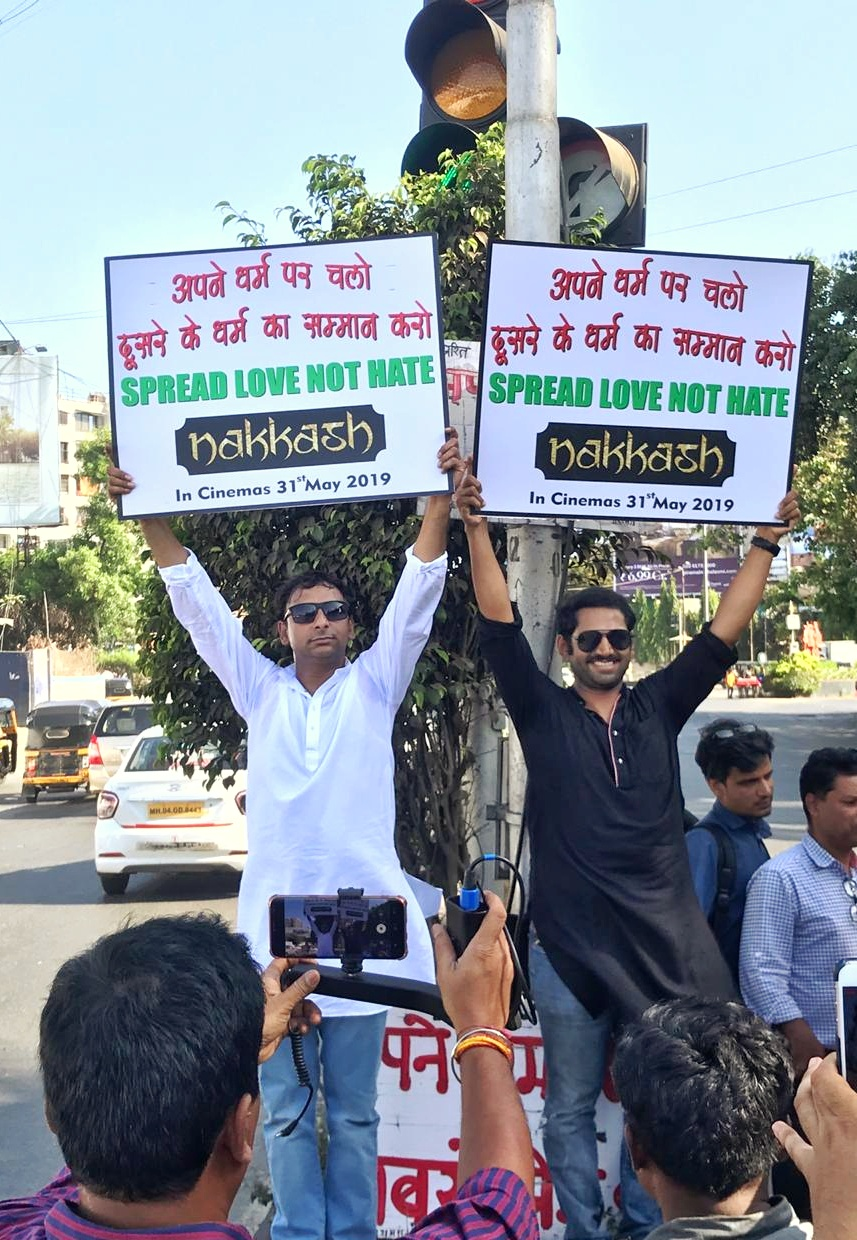
Nakkash Cast Inaamulhaq and Sharib Hashmi become Human Hoarding during unique promotion campaign

- Pallabi Dey Purkayastha from The Times of India wrote "In a nutshell, this drama on social issues ticks all the boxes of a progressive and offbeat movie"
- National Film Award winning film critic, Saibal Chatterjee wrote at NDTV "Inaamulhaq's Film Has Its Heart In The Right Place"
- Anna M. M. Vetticad's headline of his review at Firstpost says 'Hindutva hate and Muslim bigotry get a tongue lashing in a touching Varanasi saga.
- Troy Ribeiro' quotes Nakkash as 'An impressive, balanced faith film' at sify.com'
- National Film Award winning film critic, Namrata Joshi wrote at The Hindu "film’s plea to save manushyata (humaneness and humanity) is well-intentioned and hits the right spot"
- Subhash K. Jha at Bollyspice.com quotes “Nakkash Has Something To Say That We Must Hear”.
- Sakshma Srivastav in her review at Times Now mentioned "Nakkash is a sweet film with a powerful message and even more powerful performances" and also included the film in her list of 10 best Bollywood films of 2019.
- Syeda Eba at millenniumpost.in makes her review's headline quoting "A Compelling Film With Social Message"
- Suparna Sharma culminates her review at The Asian Age mentioning "Nakkash is important — because it’s a good thing when movies refuse to let us slip into complacency. Because it’s a good thing when movies remind us that democracy, secularism cannot and must not be taken for granted. Because it’s a good thing when movies tell us that our job is not done just by standing proudly and humming along when Jan Gan Man is played on the screen. All we did was take a pledge. Now we must honour those words with our actions, work."
- ET Bureau at The Economic Times in their review makes headline"A simple tale that raises important questions about religion and prejudice"
- Chirag Shah at cineeye quotes in his review "A surprising film about how love can overpower hate."
