= Fukrey (film series) =

Indian film series

- Directed by: Mrighdeep Singh Lamba
- Produced by: Farhan Akhtar; Ritesh Sidhwani
- Music by: Ram Sampath
- Production company: Excel Entertainment
- Distributed by: AA Films
- Release dates: 14 June 2013 (Fukrey); 8 December 2017 (Fukrey Returns); 28 September 2023 (Fukrey 3)
- Running time: 431 minutes (3 films)
- Budget: ₹60 crore
- Box office: est. ₹289.67 crore

Fukrey is a series of Indian Hindi-language comedy films. All films are produced by Farhan Akhtar and Ritesh Sidhwani under the banner of Excel Entertainment and directed by Mrighdeep Singh Lamba. and distributed by AA Films.

== Overview ==
=== Fukrey ===
Delhi-based school backbenchers Dilip "Choocha" Singh who has a god-gift where he can get the winning number of any lottery in his dream and Vikas "Hunny" Gulati has the talent to sand the exact number out of his dream. But struggle to afford significant amount money to get leaked question paper for class XII. Joined with college guard Pandit and Zafar, a former student of the college and a struggling musician and finally Lalli Singh who pursues education through correspondence. All of them need money badly.

All of them went Bholi Punjaban, local gangster for money by explaining Choocha's gift. But Choocha narrates fake story and backfire loose all money. To recover money Bholi gave them drug to sell.

=== Fukrey Returns ===
Hunny and Zafar are dating Priya and Neetu respectively, planning to marry them. Meanwhile, Bholi Punjaban is released from jail after 12 months and threatens the Fukras, the boys convince her, she gives them one chance and invests some money to open a Lottery Shop for them and gain profit in it.

Minister Babulal, who aspire to become chief Minister and orders the lottery to change the winning number that Choocha got from his dream, and everyone who invested money is angered. The people gather around to beat them but they escape by jumping off a flyover in the river. Choocha gains a new ability to see the future, and calls his new ability Deja Chu.

=== Fukrey 3 ===
Bholi contest for election by with support of water mafia. Hunny hatch plan made Choocha to contest opposite Bholi and because of Choocha innocence get massive support of folks. Bholi made plan and Fukras to South Africa for Choocha's deja-chu but they got another gift.

== Films ==
Film	Release date	Director	Writer(s)	Producer(s)	Runtime
Fukrey	14 June 2013	Mrighdeep Singh Lamba	Vipul Vig, Mrighdeep Singh Lamba	Farhan Akhtar, Ritesh Sidhwani	143 minutes
Fukrey Returns	8 December 2017	Mrighdeep Singh Lamba	Vipul Vig, Mrighdeep Singh Lamba	Farhan Akhtar, Ritesh Sidhwani	141 minutes
Fukrey 3	28 September 2023	Mrighdeep Singh Lamba	Vipul Vig	Farhan Akhtar, Ritesh Sidhwani	147 minutes

== Recurring cast and characters ==
List indicators

This section includes characters who will appear or have appeared in the Fukrey franchise.

- An empty grey cell indicates the character was not in the film, or that the character's official presence has not yet been confirmed.
- ^{C} indicates a cameo role.

Characters	Films		
Characters	Fukrey (2013)	Fukrey Returns (2017)	Fukrey 3 (2023)
Vikas "Hunny" Gulati	Pulkit Samrat	Pulkit Samrat	Pulkit Samrat
Dilip "Choocha" Singh	Varun Sharma	Varun Sharma	Varun Sharma
Zafar	Ali Fazal	Ali Fazal	Ali Fazal
Lali Halwai	Manjot Singh	Manjot Singh	Manjot Singh
Bholi Punjaban	Richa Chadha	Richa Chadha	Richa Chadha
Narayan Pandit	Pankaj Tripathi	Pankaj Tripathi	Pankaj Tripathi
Priya Sharma	Priya Anand	Priya Anand	
Neetu Raina	Vishakha Singh	Vishakha Singh	
Eddie	Michael Obodike	Michael Obodike	Michael Obodike
Bobby	Lucas Ogunro	Lucas Ogunro	Lucas Ogunro
School teacher	V K Sharma		V K Sharma
Choocha's mother		Neelu Kohli	Neelu Kohli
Chief Minister Brijmohan		Purnendu Bhattacharya	Purnendu Bhattacharya
Shinda Singh Ahluwalia			Manu Rishi

== Crew ==
Occupation	Film		
Occupation	Fukrey (2013)	Fukrey Returns (2017)	Fukrey 3 (2023)
Director	Mrighdeep Singh Lamba	Mrighdeep Singh Lamba	Mrighdeep Singh Lamba
Producer	Farhan Akhtar; Ritesh Sidhwani	Farhan Akhtar; Ritesh Sidhwani	Farhan Akhtar; Ritesh Sidhwani
Writer	Vipul Vig; Mrighdeep Singh Lamba	Vipul Vig; Mrighdeep Singh Lamba	Vipul Vig
Cinematography	K. U. Mohanan	Andre Menezes	Amalendu Chaudhary
Editor	Anand Subaya	Anand Subaya	Manan Ashwin Mehta
Songs	Ram Sampath	Shaarib-Toshi; Sumeet Bellary; Prem-Hardeep; Jasleen Royal; Gulraj Singh; Shree D Ishq Bector; Sameer Uddin	Tanishk Bagchi; Abhishek Nailwal; Sumeet Bellary
Background Score	Ram Sampath	Sameer Uddin	Abhishek Nailwal
Studio	Excel Entertainment	Excel Entertainment	Excel Entertainment
Distributor	AA Films	AA Films	AA Films

== Animated series ==
An animated series for kids, titled as Fukrey Boyzzz, jointly produced by Excel Entertainment and Discovery Kids India, premiered on 12 October 2019 on Discovery Kids India, which showcases the animated avatars of popular characters Hunny, Choocha, Laali, and Bholi Punjaban, along with other characters. Fukrey Boyzzz: Space Mein Fukrapanti, an Indian animated comedy film directed by Avinash Walzade was released in 2020 continuing from the series.

== Release and reception ==
Box office

Film	Release date	Budget	Worldwide Box Office
Fukrey	14 June 2013	₹8 crore (US$830,000)	₹49 crore (US$5.1 million)
Fukrey Returns	8 December 2017	₹22 crore (US$2.3 million)	₹112.30 crore (US$12 million)
Fukrey 3	28 September 2023	₹30 crore (US$3.1 million)	₹127.6 crore (US$13 million)
Total		₹60 crore (US$6.2 million)	₹289.67 crore (US$30 million)

Critical reception

Film	Rotten Tomatoes
Fukrey	50% (5/10 average rating) (6 reviews)
Fukrey Returns	11% (4/10 average rating) (9 reviews)
Fukrey 3	44% (4.7/10 average rating) (9 reviews)
