= Excel Entertainment =

Indian production company

Excel Entertainment Pvt. Ltd.
- Type: Private limited company
- Industry: Motion pictures
- Founded: 9 August 1999; 27 years ago
- Founder: Farhan Akhtar; Ritesh Sidhwani
- Headquarters: Mumbai, Maharashtra, India
- Key people: Farhan Akhtar; Ritesh Sidhwani
- Services: Film production Film distribution Record publishing
- Website: Excel Entertainment

Excel Entertainment is an Indian production company, founded by Ritesh Sidhwani and Farhan Akhtar in Mumbai in 1999. They mainly produce Hindi films.

Their debut production, Dil Chahta Hai, received critical acclaim and was a huge rage for the youth at that time. They won National Film Awards for both Dil Chahta Hai and Rock On!!. With productions such as Don, Zindagi Na Milegi Dobara, Fukrey, Dil Dhadakne Do, and Raees, they are known for presenting unique characters and a contemporary style of cinema. Gully Boy was also India's official entry to the 92nd Academy Awards.

Excel Entertainment also ventured into distribution and distributed the Hindi dubbed versions of the 2018 Indian Kannada-language period action thriller, K.G.F: Chapter 1, and its sequel, K.G.F: Chapter 2, both starring Yash. They also distributed the 2019 Telugu epic period film, Sye Raa Narasimha Reddy, starring Chiranjeevi. Additionally, they ventured into streaming with India's first original series Inside Edge (2017-2021), with other such ventures including Made in Heaven (2019-2023).

Coinciding with the silver jubilee anniversary of Dil Chahta Hai in 2026, the company launched the Excel Music record label, with Universal Music India owning the publishing license as distributor, besides acquiring a stake in the company. The label has since debuted with Mirzapur: The Movie, a film adaptation of the successful web series of the same name.

== History ==
The company's first production was the critically acclaimed, Dil Chahta Hai (2001), which marked the directorial debut of Farhan Akhtar. The film received a National Award in the category of Best Feature Film Hindi and was also screened at IFFI The company then went on to produce the war-drama, Lakshya (2004). While it was critically acclaimed, it did not fare well at the box-office. Over the years, it has developed a huge cult following and is considered to be one of the greatest coming-of-age films in Hindi cinema. Excel also produced Don (2006).

On 16 July 2021, Rakeysh Omprakash Mehra's sports drama, Toofaan, released directly on Amazon Prime Video. It starred Farhan Akhtar, Paresh Rawal, and Mrunal Thakur. It opened to highly mixed reviews. Bollywood Bubble stated Toofan, literal meaning ‘storm’ lives up to its name in all honestly. It is a film about life and choices.

The second collaboration of Farhan Akhtar and Rakeysh Omprakash Mehra happened after their first successful film Bhaag Milkha Bhaag. An action sports drama entertainer Toofaan released on 16 July 2021, on Amazon Prime Video starring Farhan Akhtar, Paresh Rawal, Mrunal Thakur. The film was directed by Rakeysh Omprakash Mehra.

On 15 February 2021, Yudhra, starring Siddhant Chaturvedi, Malavika Mohanan and Raghav Juyal was announced. The film is being helmed by Ravi Udyawar, of Mom fame. Initially slated to be released in 2022, it was mired in reshoots and is now planned for a 2024 release.

On 11 August 2021, Jee Le Zaraa, starring Priyanka Chopra Jonas, Katrina Kaif and Alia Bhatt was announced. The female-centric road film will be directed by Farhan Akhtar, from a story written by Zoya Akhtar, Reema Kagti, and himself.

== Filmography ==
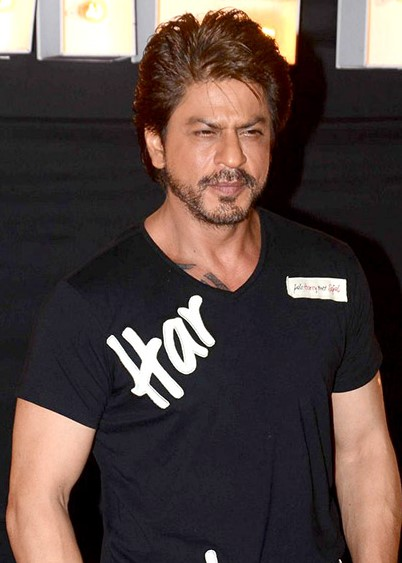
Shah Rukh Khan has worked with Excel Entertainment on three projects, including the company's highest grosser Raees.

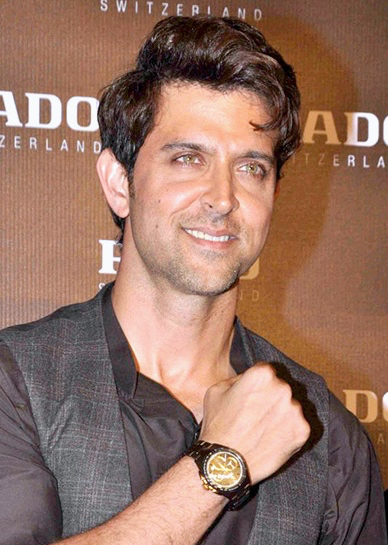
Hrithik Roshan has worked with Excel Entertainment on two successful projects: Lakshya and Zindagi Na Milegi Dobara.

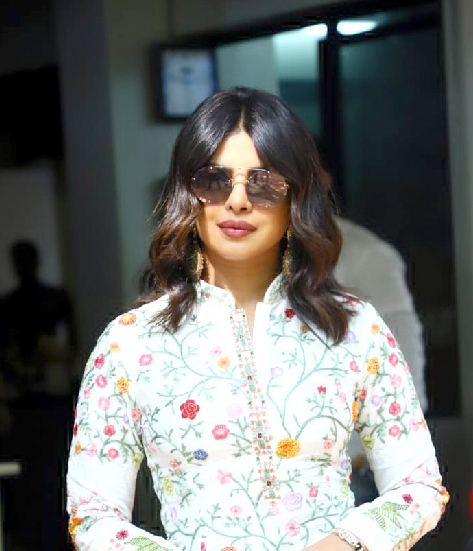
Priyanka Chopra has worked on four projects with the company, such as the Don series and Dil Dhadakne Do.

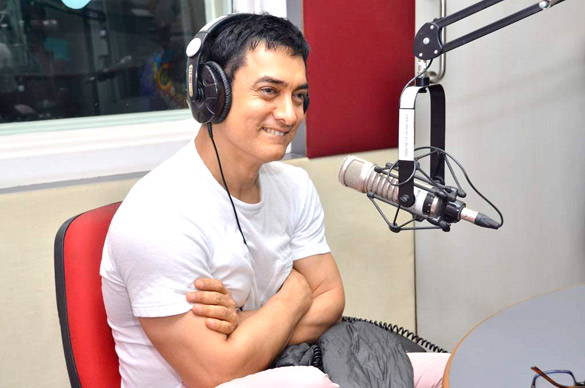
Aamir Khan has starred in two top-grossing films of the company, Dil Chahta Hai and Talaash: The Answer Lies Within.

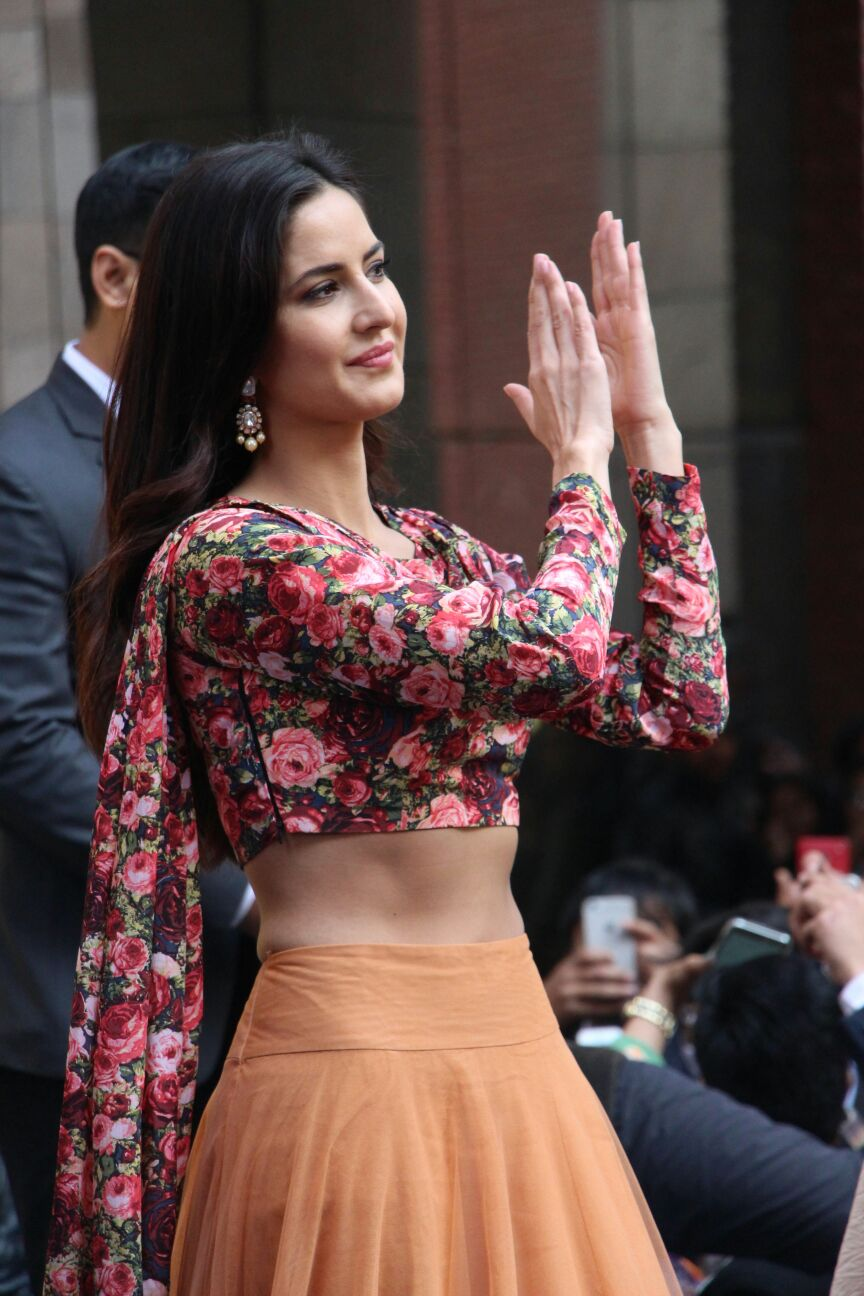
Katrina Kaif has collaborated on three projects, beginning with Zindagi Na Milegi Dobara.

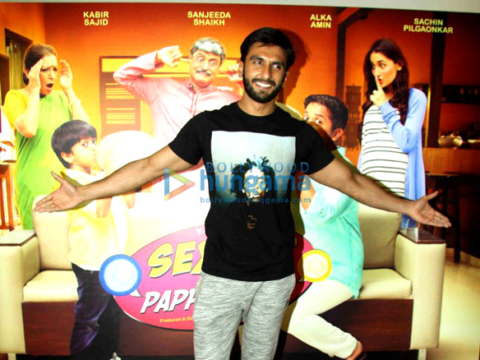
Ranveer Singh has worked with the company two times.

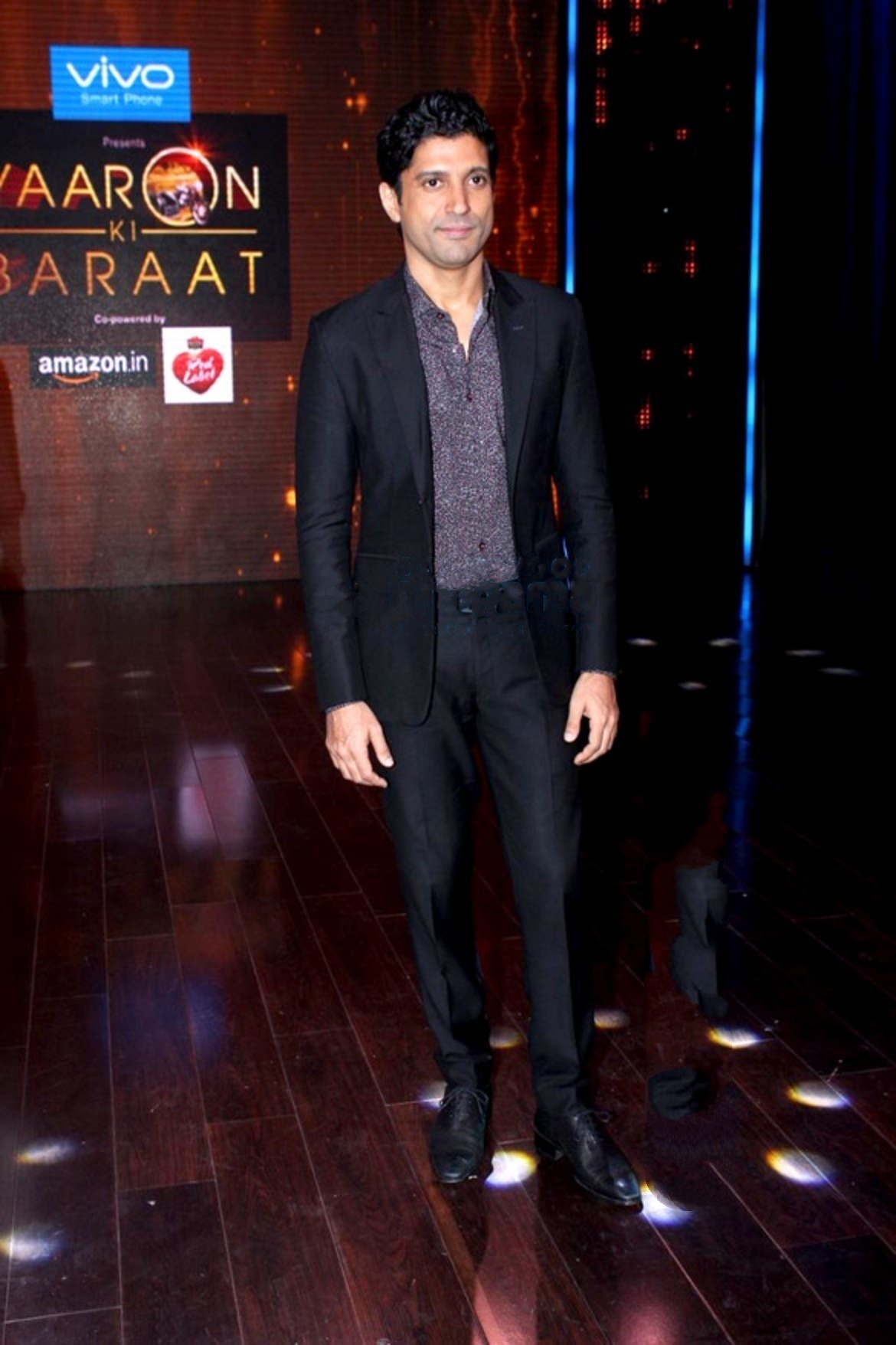
Founder and lead producer Farhan Akhtar made his acting debut with Rock On!!, after which he starred in seven more of the company's projects.

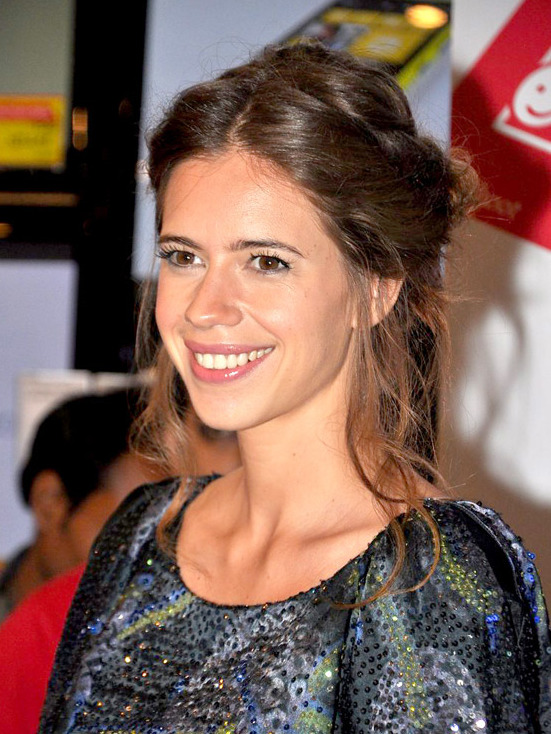
Kalki Koechlin has worked with the company on three projects, particularly in the Zoya Akhtar-directed films Zindagi Na Milegi Dobara and Gully Boy.

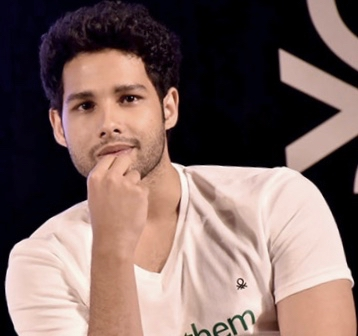
Siddhant Chaturvedi made his acting debut with Gully Boy, after which he worked with the company three more times.

Key
†	Denotes films that have not yet been released

Year	Title	Director	Producer	Cast	Notes	Ref.
2001	Dil Chahta Hai	Farhan Akhtar	Ritesh Sidhwani	Aamir Khan, Saif Ali Khan, Akshaye Khanna, Preity Zinta, Dimple Kapadia, Sonali Kulkarni	National Film Award for Best Feature Film in Hindi, 7 Filmfare Awards, 7 Screen Awards, 4 IIFA Awards, 2 Zee Cine Awards	
2004	Lakshya	Farhan Akhtar	Ritesh Sidhwani	Amitabh Bachchan, Hrithik Roshan, Preity Zinta, Om Puri, Boman Irani	Co-produced with UTV Motion Pictures, National Film Awards for Best Choreography - Mai Aisa Kyun Hoon, 2 Filmfare Awards	
2006	Don	Farhan Akhtar	Ritesh Sidhwani, Farhan Akhtar	Shahrukh Khan, Priyanka Chopra, Arjun Rampal, Kareena Kapoor, Isha Koppikar, Boman Irani	Winner of Best Asian Film at Neuchâtel International Fantastic Film Festival	
2007	Honeymoon Travels Pvt. Ltd.	Reema Kagti	Ritesh Sidhwani, Farhan Akhtar	Shabana Azmi, Boman Irani, Kay Kay Menon, Raima Sen, Amisha Patel, Karan Khanna, Vikram Chatwal, Sandhya Mridul, Diya Mirza, Ranvir Shorey, Abhay Deol, Minissha Lamba, Arjun Rampal		
2007	Positive	Farhan Akhtar	Ritesh Sidhwani, Farhan Akhtar	Arjun Mathur, Shabana Azmi, Boman Irani	Positive was a part of AIDS JaaGo (AIDS Awake), a series of four short films	
2008	Rock On!!	Abhishek Kapoor	Ritesh Sidhwani, Farhan Akhtar	Farhan Akhtar, Arjun Rampal, Purab Kohli, Luke Kenny, Prachi Desai, Shahana Goswami	Co-produced with Big Pictures, National Film Awards for Best Feature Film and Best Supporting Actor, 7 Filmfare Awards, 6 Screen Awards, 3 IIFA Awards.	
2009	Luck by Chance	Zoya Akhtar	Ritesh Sidhwani, Farhan Akhtar	Farhan Akhtar, Konkona Sen Sharma, Rishi Kapoor, Dimple Kapadia, Isha Sharvani, Juhi Chawla, Sanjay Kapoor, Aly Khan, Sheeba Chaddha, Hrithik Roshan	Co-produced with Big Pictures, 22 Actors made a guest appearance in the film	
2010	Karthik Calling Karthik	Vijay Lalwani	Ritesh Sidhwani, Farhan Akhtar	Farhan Akhtar, Deepika Padukone	Co-produced with Magic Beans Films	
2011	Game	Abhinay Deo	Ritesh Sidhwani, Farhan Akhtar	Abhishek Bachchan, Boman Irani, Anupam Kher, Jimmy Shergill, Kangana Ranaut, Shahana Goswami, Gauhar Khan, Sarah-Jane Dias	Co-produced with Eros International	
2011	Zindagi Na Milegi Dobara	Zoya Akhtar	Ritesh Sidhwani, Farhan Akhtar	Hrithik Roshan, Farhan Akhtar, Abhay Deol, Katrina Kaif, Kalki Koechlin	Co-produced with Eros International, National Film Awards for Best Choreography and Best Audiography, 9 IIFA Awards, 7 Filmfare Awards, 6 Star Guild Awards, 4 Zee Cine Awards, 2 Mirchi Music Awards, 2 Screen Awards, 1 Stardust Awards, 1 Big Star Entertainment Awards	
2011	Don 2	Farhan Akhtar	Ritesh Sidhwani, Farhan Akhtar, Shah Rukh Khan	Shah Rukh Khan, Priyanka Chopra, Boman Irani, Om Puri, Kunal Kapoor, Lara Dutta	Co-produced with Reliance Entertainment & Film Base Berlin, 2 Filmfare Awards, 2 Producers Film Guild Awards, 2 Screen Awards, 2 Lions Gold Awards, 1 ETC Bollywood Business Awards, 1 Zee Cine Awards	
2012	Talaash	Reema Kagti	Ritesh Sidhwani, Farhan Akhtar, Aamir Khan	Aamir Khan, Rani Mukerji, Kareena Kapoor Khan, Nawazuddin Siddiqui, Shernaz Patel	Co-Produced with Reliance Entertainment & Aamir Khan Productions, 1 Mirchi Music Award	
2013	Fukrey	Mrighdeep Singh Lamba	Ritesh Sidhwani, Farhan Akhtar	Pulkit Samrat, Manjot Singh, Ali Fazal, Varun Sharma, Richa Chadda, Priya Anand, Pankaj Tripathi, Vishakha Singh	1 Screen Award, 1 Star Guild Award	
2015	Bangistan	Karan Anshuman	Ritesh Sidhwani, Farhan Akhtar	Riteish Deshmukh, Pulkit Samrat, Jacqueline Fernandez	Co-produced with Junglee Pictures	
2015	Dil Dhadakne Do	Zoya Akhtar	Ritesh Sidhwani, Farhan Akhtar	Anil Kapoor, Shefali Shah, Priyanka Chopra, Ranveer Singh, Anushka Sharma, Farhan Akhtar	Co-produced with Junglee Pictures, 3 Stardust Awards, 2 Screen Awards, 1 Big Star Entertainment Award, 1 Filmfare Award, 1 IIFA Award, 1 Times of India Film Awards	
2016	Baar Baar Dekho	Nitya Mehra	Ritesh Sidhwani, Farhan Akhtar, Karan Johar	Sidharth Malhotra, Katrina Kaif	Co-produced with Eros International & Dharma Productions, 1 Zee Cine Awards	
2016	Rock On 2	Shujaat Saudagar	Ritesh Sidhwani, Farhan Akhtar	Farhan Akhtar, Arjun Rampal, Shraddha Kapoor	Co-produced with Eros International	
2017	Raees	Rahul Dholakia	Ritesh Sidhwani, Farhan Akhtar, Gauri Khan	Shah Rukh Khan, Nawazuddin Siddiqui, Mahira Khan	Co-Produced with Red Chillies Entertainment, 1 Mirchi Music Award, 1 Screen AWrds, 1 Zee Cine Awards, 1 Indian Recording Arts Awards	
2017	Fukrey Returns	Mrighdeep Singh Lamba	Ritesh Sidhwani, Farhan Akhtar	Pulkit Samrat, Manjot Singh, Ali Fazal, Varun Sharma, Richa Chadha, Priya Anand, Pankaj Tripathi, Vishakha Singh		
2018	3 Storeys	Arjun Mukerjee	Ritesh Sidhwani, Farhan Akhtar, Priya Sreedharan	Pulkit Samrat, Richa Chadda, Renuka Shahane, Masumeh Makhija, Sharman Joshi, Tarun Anand, Ankit Rathi, Aisha Ahmed	Co-produced with B4U Motion Pictures & Open Air Films	
2018	Gold	Reema Kagti	Ritesh Sidhwani, Farhan Akhtar	Akshay Kumar, Mouni Roy, Kunal Kapoor, Amit Sadh, Vineet Kumar Singh, Sunny Kaushal		
2019	Gully Boy	Zoya Akhtar	Ritesh Sidhwani, Farhan Akhtar, Zoya Akhtar	Ranveer Singh, Alia Bhatt, Siddhant Chaturvedi, Vijay Varma, Kalki Koechlin, Vijay Raaz, Amruta Subhash	Co-produced with Tiger Baby Films, The film was selected as the Indian entry for the Best International Feature Film at the 92nd Academy Awards,13 Filmfare Awards, 12 Screen Awards, 9 Zee Cine Awards, 1 Mirchi Music Awards	
2021	Hello Charlie	Pankaj Saraswat	Ritesh Sidhwani, Farhan Akhtar	Jackie Shroff, Aadar Jain, Shlokka Pandit, Elnaaz Norouzi	Released on Amazon Prime Video	
2021	Toofaan	Rakeysh Omprakash Mehra	Ritesh Sidhwani, Farhan Akhtar, Rakeysh Omprakash Mehra	Farhan Akhtar, Paresh Rawal, Mrunal Thakur	Co-produced with ROMP Pictures; Released on Amazon Prime Video	
2022	Sharmaji Namkeen	Hitesh Bhatia	Farhan Akhtar, Ritesh Sidhwani, Honey Trehan, Abhishek Chaubey	Rishi Kapoor, Paresh Rawal	Co-produced with MacGuffin Pictures; Released on Amazon Prime Video	
2022	Phone Bhoot	Gurmmeet Singh	Ritesh Sidhwani, Farhan Akhtar	Katrina Kaif, Siddhant Chaturvedi, Ishaan Khatter		
2023	Friday Night Plan	Vatsal Neelakantan	Ritesh Sidhwani, Farhan Akhtar, Kassim Jagmagia	Juhi Chawla, Babil Khan, Amrith Jayan, Medha Rana, Aadhya Anand, Ninad Kamat	Netflix film	
2023	Fukrey 3	Mrighdeep Singh Lamba	Ritesh Sidhwani, Farhan Akhtar	Pulkit Samrat, Varun Sharma, Richa Chaddha, Manjot Singh, Pankaj Tripathi		
2023	Kho Gaye Hum Kahan	Arjun Singh Varain	Ritesh Sidhwani, Farhan Akhtar, Zoya Akhtar, Reema Kagti	Adarsh Gourav, Siddhant Chaturvedi, Ananya Pandey	Netflix film	
2024	Madgaon Express	Kunal Khemu	Ritesh Sidhwani, Farhan Akhtar	Divyendu Sharma, Pratik Gandhi, Avinash Tiwary, Nora Fatehi		
2024	Boong	Lakshmipriya Devi	Ritesh Sidhwani, Farhan Akhtar	Gugun Kipgen, Bala Hijam	Co-produced with Chalkboard Entertainment and Suitable Pictures; premiered in the Discovery section at the 49th Toronto International Film Festival in 2024.	
2024	Yudhra	Ravi Udyawar	Ritesh Sidhwani, Farhan Akhtar	Siddhant Chaturvedi, Malavika Mohanan		
2024	Agni	Rahul Dholakia	Ritesh Sidhwani, Farhan Akhtar	Pratik Gandhi, Divyenndu, Saiyami Kher	Release on Amazon Prime Video	
2025	Superboys of Malegaon	Reema Kagti	Ritesh Sidhwani, Farhan Akhtar, Zoya Akhtar, Reema Kagti	Adarsh Gourav, Shashank Arora, Vineet Kumar Singh, Riddhi Kumar		
2025	Ground Zero	Tejas Prabha Vijay Deoskar	Ritesh Sidhwani, Farhan Akhtar, Abhishek Kumar, Nishikant Roy, Kassim Jagmagia, Vishal Ramchandani, Sundeep C Sidhwani, Arhan Bagati	Emraan Hashmi, Sai Tamhankar, Zoya Hussain	Co-produced with Dreamzkrraft Entertainment, Talisman Films	
2025	Songs of Paradise	Danish Renzu	Ritesh Sidhwani, Farhan Akhtar, Shafat Qazi, Danish Renzu	Saba Azad, Soni Razdan, Zain Khan Durrani		
2025	120 Bahadur	Razneesh Ghai (Razy)	Ritesh Sidhwani, Farhan Akhtar, Amit Chandra	Farhan Akhtar, Raashii Khanna		
2026	Mirzapur: The Movie	Gurmmeet Singh	Ritesh Sidhwani, Farhan Akhtar, Kassim Jagmagia, Vishal Ramchandani	Pankaj Tripathi, Ali Fazal, Divyenndu, Jitendra Kumar, Ravi Kishan, Abhishek Banerjee, Rasika Dugal, Shweta Tripathi, Shriya Pilgaonkar, Harshita Gaur, Sushant Singh, Mohit Malik, Sheeba Chaddha, Rajesh Tailang, Kulbhushan Kharbanda, Shaji Choudhary, Sonal Chauhan, Pramod Pathak, Anangsha Biswas, Satendra Soni	Co-produced with Amazon MGM Studios	

=== Television series ===
Year	Title	Platform
2017–2021	Inside Edge	Amazon Prime Video
2018 – present	Mirzapur	Amazon Prime Video
2019 – present	Made in Heaven	Amazon Prime Video
2019 – present	Fukrey Boyzzz	Discovery Kids
2022	Eternally Confused and Eager for Love	Netflix
2023	Dahaad	Amazon Prime Video
2023	Bambai Meri Jaan	Amazon Prime Video
2025	Dabba Cartel	Netflix
2025	Andhera	Amazon Prime Video

== Film distribution ==
Year	Title	Director	Producer	Cast	Notes	Ref.
2018	K.G.F: Chapter 1	Prashanth Neel	Vijay Kiragandur	Yash, Srinidhi Shetty, Ramachandra Raju, Archana Jois, Anant Nag, Vasishta N. Simha, Mouni Roy	Hindi only	
2019	Sye Raa Narasimha Reddy	Surender Reddy	Ram Charan, Konidela Production Company	Chiranjeevi, Amitabh Bachchan, Kiccha Sudeep, Jagapathi Babu, Vijay Sethupathi, Nayanthara, Tamannaah Bhatia, Ravi Kishan	Hindi only	
2022	K.G.F: Chapter 2	Prashanth Neel	Vijay Kiragandur	Yash, Sanjay Dutt, Raveena Tandon, Srinidhi Shetty	Hindi only	
2025	Ramayana: The Legend of Prince Rama	Koichi Sasaki, Ram Mohan, Yugo Sako	Yugo Sako, Kenji Yoshii, Atsushi Matsuo	Nikhil Kapoor, Rael Padamsee, Uday Mathan, Mishal Varma, Noel Godin	co-distributed by Geek Pictures India	
2025	Tanvi the Great	Anupam Kher	Anupam Kher	Shubhangi Dutt, Anupam Kher		
2026	Half	Samjad	Anne, Sajeev	Ranjith Sajeev, Aiswarya Raj, Abbas, Amala Paul	North Indian distribution and worldwide Hindi release only	
