= Manjot Singh =

Indian actor (born 1992)

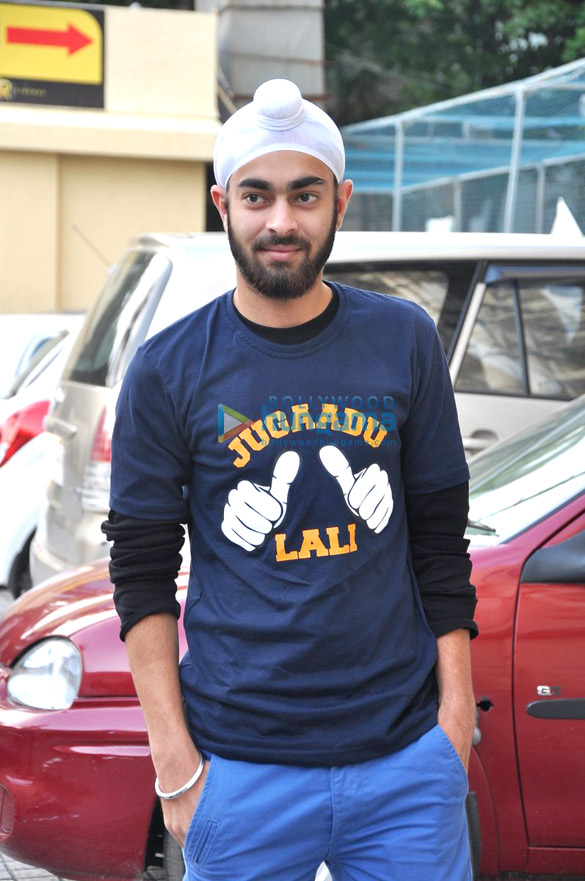
- Singh in March 2014
- Born: 7 July 1992 (age 34); New Delhi, India
- Occupation: Actor
- Years active: 2008–present

Manjot Singh (born 7 July 1992) is an Indian Bollywood actor, best known for his role in films like Oye Lucky! Lucky Oye!, Student Of The Year and Fukrey. He won Filmfare Critics Award for Best Actor for his performance in Oye Lucky! Lucky Oye!.

== Early life and education ==
Manjot Singh was born in New Delhi into a Punjabi Sikh family. His mother is a housewife while his father is a businessman. He completed his schooling from the Hillwoods Academy, located in New Delhi.

== Career ==
Manjot went to audition for the role of the lead character's younger self in Dibakar Banerjee's Oye Lucky! Lucky Oye!, though Singh had never acted before, even in school plays. After the audition, the casting director rejected Singh for the role. However, Dibakar Banerjee insisted on casting him, later saying "Even though the casting director wasn't convinced, I just put my foot down." Oye Lucky! Lucky Oye! received positive critical acclaim and critics lauded Manjot for his role with Noyon Jyoti Parasara of Sanskriti Media stating, "...Special mention is deserved by Manjot Singh, who plays the younger Lucky" and Khalid Mohammad appreciating his performance as a callow teenager, among other publications.

After being selected, Singh went to Manali for a week-long acting workshop. He was asked to observe the way actor Abhay Deol walked, smiled and talked so that he could imitate that in his acting. He even wore a cheek pad so that his jaw would look as broad as Abhay Deol's. Singh's performance was well appreciated by the critics and he received the Filmfare Critics Award for the Best Actor category. Later, Manjot participated in the reality show Fear Factor - Khatron Ke Khiladi Level 3 in 2010.

In 2012, Singh starred in Udaan, directed by Vikramaditya Motwane. The film received positive reviews, and is considered a postmodern masterpiece. Later in 2012, Singh signed up for Punjabi musical drama Pure Punjabi, directed by Munish Sharma, about four close friends in Punjab who had a strong passion for music. In the same year, he played the character role of Dimpy in Karan Johar's coming-of-age romantic comedy film, Student of the Year, starring Siddharth Malhotra, Alia Bhatt and Varun Dhawan in the lead roles.

In 2013, Singh starred in Fukrey, directed by Mrighdeep Singh Lamba, starring Vishakha Singh, Richa Chadda, Priya Anand, Ali Fazal, Varun Sharma and Pulkit Samrat. The film was a sleeper hit and spawned two commercially successful sequels in 2017 and 2023 where he reprised his role as Lali. He also reprised his role as Lali in a cameo appearance in the 2022 film Phone Bhoot.

In 2019, Singh starred in Penalty directed by Shubham Singh, starring Kay Kay Menon, Shashank Arora, and Mohit Nain. In the same year, he also starred in the film Dream Girl and made a cameo appearance reprising his role as Dimpy alongside Sahil Anand in Student of the Year 2 in 2019.

In 2024, he starred in his first lead role in the Netflix film Wild Wild Punjab, alongside Varun Sharma, Jassie Gill, Sunny Singh, Patralekha and Ishita Raj Sharma. The film received mixed reviews from critics, but also applauded the film for its humour. He continued to star in supporting roles in films like Vicky Vidya Ka Woh Wala Video and Param Sundari. He will also be starring in the 2025 film Kis Kisko Pyaar Karoon 2.

== Filmography ==
Key
†	Denotes films that have not yet been released

=== Films ===
Year	Film	Role	Notes
2008	Oye Lucky! Lucky Oye!	Young Lovinder 'Lucky' Singh	Won Filmfare Critics Award
2010	Udaan	Maninder Singh	
2012	Pure Punjabi	Param	Punjabi Film
2012	Student of the Year	Dimpy	
2013	Fukrey	Lali Halwai	
2013	What the Fish	Pummy Singh Cameo	
2014	Balwinder Singh Famous Ho Gaya		Cameo
2016	Snafu	Sunny Singh	
2016	Zoya		
2016	Azhar	Navjot Singh Sidhu	
2017	Jab Harry Met Sejal	Sartaj	Deleted Scene
2017	The Zero Line		
2017	Fukrey Returns	Lali Halwai	
2018	Morjim	Sam	
2019	Student of the Year 2	Commentator Dimpy	Cameo
2019	Penalty	Ishwerjot Singh Dhillon	
2019	Dream Girl	Smiley Singh	
2022	Phone Bhoot	Lali Halwai	Cameo
2023	Dream Girl 2	Smiley Singh	
2023	Fukrey 3	Lali Halwai	
2024	Wild Wild Punjab	Honey Singh	Netflix film
2024	Vicky Vidya Ka Woh Wala Video	Lawyer	
2025	Param Sundari	Jaggi	
2025	Kis Kisko Pyaar Karoon 2	Harbir/Hubby	

=== Television ===
Year	Title	Role	Notes	Ref.
2010	Khatron Ke Khiladi	Contestant	Reality show	
2018	What's Your Status	Baljinder Singh		
2018-2023	College Romance	Trippy	Web series	
2019	Made in Heaven	Joginder Sethi		
2020	Zindagi inShort	Amrik Singh		
2021	Chutzpah	Rishi	Web series	
