= Fukrey =

2013 Indian film by Mrighdeep Singh Lamba

- Theatrical release poster
- Directed by: Mrighdeep Singh Lamba
- Written by: Screenplay: Vipul Vig; Mrighdeep Singh Lamba; Dialogues: Vipul Vig; Additional Dialogues: Mrighdeep Singh Lamba; Concept: Preeti Singh
- Story by: Vipul Vig
- Produced by: Farhan Akhtar; Ritesh Sidhwani
- Starring: Pulkit Samrat; Manjot Singh; Ali Fazal; Varun Sharma; Priya Anand; Vishakha Singh; Pankaj Tripathi; Richa Chadda
- Cinematography: K. U. Mohanan
- Edited by: Anand Subaya
- Music by: Ram Sampath
- Production company: Excel Entertainment
- Distributed by: AA Films
- Release date: 14 June 2013
- Running time: 143 minutes
- Country: India
- Language: Hindi
- Budget: ₹8 crore
- Box office: ₹53 crore

Fukrey (transl. Slackers) is a 2013 Indian Hindi-language comedy thriller film, directed by Mrighdeep Singh Lamba, produced by Farhan Akhtar and Ritesh Sidhwani, and starring Pulkit Samrat, Manjot Singh, Varun Sharma, Ali Fazal, Priya Anand, Vishakha Singh, Pankaj Tripathi and Richa Chadda. The story and dialogues are written by Vipul Vig and the screenplay is written by Vig and Lamba. Produced under the Excel Entertainment banner, the film was released on 14 June 2013. Despite a poor opening, the film went on to become a sleeper hit.

The film later spawned two sequels, Fukrey Returns (2017) and Fukrey 3 (2023), making it the first installment in the Fukrey franchise.

== Plot ==
Delhi-based school backbenchers Vikas "Hunny" Gulati and Dilip "Choocha" Singh are perpetually dreaming of making it big and want to get into the local college but don't have the required grades. The college guard Pandit tells them that he can provide them with the leaked class XII papers for a large sum of money. Choocha has the power to get the winning number of any lottery in his dream, and Hunny has the talent to sand the exact number out of his dream. They cannot afford or collect the money required, so they decide to sell the papers to other students but fail there too. Meanwhile, through Pandit, they meet Zafar, a former student of the college and a struggling musician. The fourth character is Lali, whose father Billa runs a sweet shop. Lali is currently pursuing his degree through correspondence and, like Hunny and Choocha, also wants to get into the same college, where his girlfriend Shalu, who ignores him all the time, studies. Pandit asks Lali to donate ₹250,000 in the college development fund to get admission, but Billa refuses to, saying college is too costly. Zafar's girlfriend, Neetu, who has broken up with him over his career choices, is now giving private tuition to Lali so that he can get the marks to get into the college of his dreams. On the other hand, Zafar's father faces a stroke and is paralysed. Zafar badly needs money for his treatment.

The four meet up at Pandit's office, where Hunny explains his scheme. However, since now they all together need a lot of money, they need someone to invest their money. On Zafar's insistence, Pandit is talked into taking them to meet a local gangster, Bholi Punjaban, where Hunny tells them their scheme. Bholi is ready to invest, and Lali also gives his shop papers as a mortgage. Bholi tells them to come the next day with the number. However, the same night, everyone except Choocha falls asleep. The next morning, Choocha narrates a fake dream, which Hunny interprets and gets a number. They go to Bholi and tell the number, but it backfires, and Bholi loses her money. Now to recover her money, she gives them a packet containing drug pills, which Zafar, Hunny, and Lali have to sell at a rave party the same night. She keeps Choocha as security with her. At the party, police and the Narcotics division conduct a raid, and Lali escapes with a packet with the police chasing him. Lali manages to fool the cops and reaches Neetu's place. He also sees Zafar there. Neetu throws the drugs down the drain just as the police are about to search her home. The cops leave her place, warning Lali. Meanwhile, Zafar tells the whole story to Neetu, and he was thinking that Neetu was falling for him, but she refuses. Zafar also warns him. Lali also calls Choocha, telling him to run from Bholi's house, which he succeeds in doing.

The next morning, all five of them land up at Bholi's place. She gives them 24 hours to pay all the money due; otherwise, she would take the money by selling Lali's shop. The four are fighting at Zafar's place, where Choocha tells them the truth about not seeing the dream. However, he says to them that he slept last night, and he saw a dream. Zafar is not interested, while Lali, Hunny, and Neetu are. Hunny interprets the dream, but they are short of cash even after Neetu is ready to give her savings. However, next morning Lali is able to borrow some money from a homeless man who used to remove parts from Lali's motorcycle. They invest and win a huge amount. They go to Bholi's house and give her the money. Hunny tells Bholi that he wants to sell the drug pills again and gives her an advance. Impressed, Bholi goes inside and returns with the pills, only to be caught red-handed by the police and Narcotics Division, who have raided her home. While Hunny, Choocha, Lali, and Neetu were investing the money, Zafar met the Narcotics Division and made a plan to catch Bholi and also called Neetu, Lali, Choocha, and Hunny, where they confessed to the police. Now with Bholi behind bars, the police pardon the four, and they are free.

Three months later, it is shown that Hunny and Choocha have become rich and are entering the same college on horses as they had planned at the beginning of the film, while Pandit is shocked to see them. Lali is making new girlfriends. Priya reunites with Hunny, and Neetu gets engaged to Zafar. Lali, Zafar, Neetu, and Priya are having a good laugh.

== Cast ==
- Pulkit Samrat as Vikas "Hunny" Gulati
- Manjot Singh as Lali Halwai
- Ali Fazal as Zafar Bhai
- Varun Sharma as Dilip "Choocha" Singh
- Priya Anand as Priya Sharma, Hunny's love interest
- Vishakha Singh as Neetu Raina, Zafar's fiance
- Pankaj Tripathi as Narayan Pandit "Panditji"
- Richa Chadha as Bholi Punjaban; Bholi's character is loosely based on alleged pimp Sonu Punjaban
- Bhupesh Rai as Bhuppa Ali
- Ashraful Haque as Smakiya
- Anurag Arora as a narco officer
- Ajay Trehan as Inspector Khanna
- Pooja Kalra as a fat woman on the bus
- V K Sharma as Hunny's and Choocha's schoolteacher
- Smarty as a young boy in Gurudwara
- S.K. Lalwani as Zafar's father
- Kumkum Ajit Kumar Das as Zafar's mother
- Divya Phadnis as Shalu, Lali's former girlfriend
- Tejeshwar Singh as Monty
- Sanjeeva Vats as a lottery seller
- Shrikant as Minister's P.A.
- Arun Verma as Pradhan
- Jatinder Bakshi as Jagrata Singer
- Mehak Manwani as Lali's new girlfriend in college
- Michael Obidke as Eddie
- Raj Sharma as Music Composer
- Sukhwinder Chahal as a passerby in Gurudwara
- Majinder Singh P. Kareer as Billa Halwai, Lali's father

== Production ==
=== Filming ===
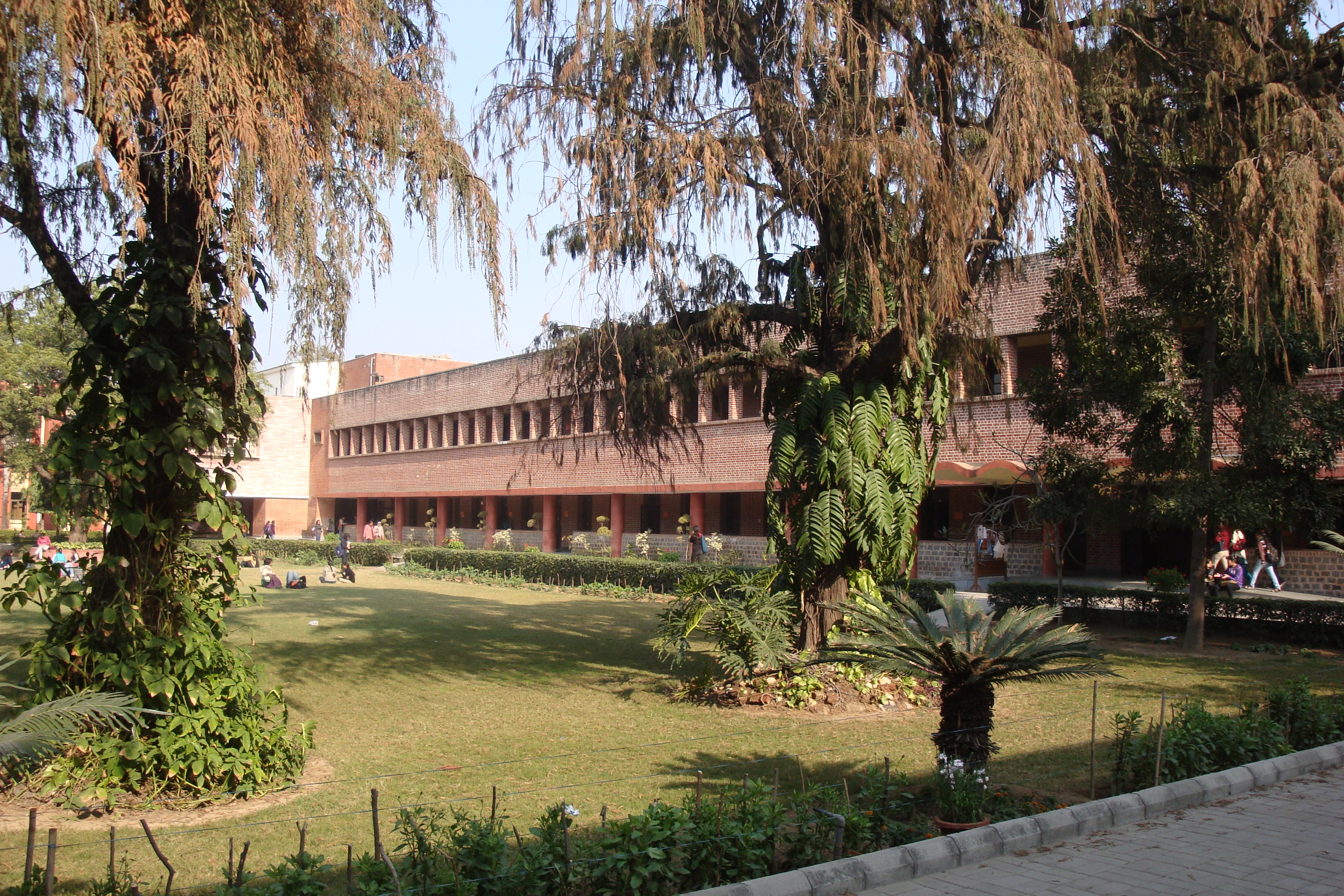
Many parts of the film were shot in Miranda House

The film was shot extensively in Delhi at various locations, including Miranda House, where most of the college sequences and opening song were shot.

== Soundtrack ==
Distributed and released by T-Series, the soundtrack of Fukrey is composed by Ram Sampath, with lyrics by writer Vipul Vig for the title track, director and additional writer Mrighdeep Singh Lamba for two songs, and Munna Dhiman for the rest. Fukrey is thus the first Excel Entertainment production to not feature songs written by producer Farhan Akhtar's father and regular lyricist Javed Akhtar.

Fukrey

Soundtrack album by Ram Sampath
- Released: 14 April 2013 (India)
- Genre: Feature film soundtrack
- Length: 25:19
- Label: T-Series
- Producers: Ritesh Sidhwani; Farhan Akhtar

Ram Sampath chronology
'Talaash: The Answer Lies Within' (2012)	Fukrey (2013)	'Purani Jeans' (2014)

Track listing
No.	Title	Lyrics	Singer(s)	Length
1.	"Fuk Fuk Fukme"	Vipul Vig	Ram Sampath, Amjad Bagadwa	3:26
2.	"Beda Paar"	Mrighdeep Singh Lamba	Tarannum Malik, Mika Singh	4:03
3.	"Lag Gayi Lottery"	Mrighdeep Singh Lamba	Tarannum Malik, Ram Sampath, Sona Mohapatra	3:18
4.	"Karle Jugaad Karle"	Munna Dhiman	Kailash Kher, Pradipta Guha, Keerthi Sagathia	6:01
5.	"Rabba"	Munna Dhiman	Ram Sampath Clinton Cerejo, Keerthi Sagathia	4:23
6.	"Ambarsariya"	Munna Dhiman	Sona Mohapatra	4:08
Total length:				25:19

=== Reception ===
The music of the film received good reviews, especially for the song "Ambarsariya", an adaptation of a traditional Punjabi folk song, performed by Sona Mohapatra.

== Re-release ==
The film was re-released in theatres due to public demand and popularity. The PVR Cinemas showed Fukrey along with other movies in September 2013.

== Reception ==
=== Critical reception ===
On the review aggregator website Rotten Tomatoes, 50% of 6 critics' reviews are positive, with an average rating of 5/10.

Taran Adarsh of Bollywood Hungama rated it 3.5/5 and quoted, "Fukrey is a twisted and delectably uproarious take on the shortcuts the youth of today indulge in". Rajeev Masand of CNN-IBN rated the movie 2.5/5 and noted that, "A tighter script and more screen time for the excellent Pankaj Tripathi, as enterprising campus security guard Panditji, might have helped turn this moderately entertaining film into a rollicking good caper." Saibal Chatterjee of NDTV gave the film a 3/5 rating.

=== Box office ===
Fukrey grossed around ₹142 million within the first five days of its release. By the end of its second week, the film had collected ₹290 million nett in the domestic markets. The business of the film was varied across India. It was a success in Delhi/UP and East Punjab, as well as in Rajasthan but average in the rest of the country. The film collected around ₹20 million net on its second Friday which was just 20% less than the first day. Fukrey collected ₹360 million in the domestic markets by the end of its theatrical run.

== Awards and nominations ==
Award	Category	Result	Recipient	Ref.
Screen Awards	Best Actor in a Comic Role (Male/Female)	Won	Richa Chadda (Bholi Punjaban)	
Screen Awards	Best Actor in a Comic Role (Male/Female)	Nominated	Varun Sharma (Choocha)	
Screen Awards	Best Ensemble Cast	Nominated	Fukrey	
Screen Awards	Best Screenplay	Nominated	Mrigdeep Singh Lamba & Vipul Vig	
Big Star Awards	BIG Star Most Entertaining Comedy Film	Nominated	Fukrey	
Big Star Awards	BIG Star Most Entertaining Singer	Nominated	Sona Mohapatra ("Ambarsariya")	
Star Guild Awards	Best Dialog	Nominated	Vipul Vig & Mrighdeep Singh Lamba	
Star Guild Awards	Best Performance In A Negative Role	Nominated	Richa Chadda	
Star Guild Awards	Most Promising Debut - Male	Nominated	Varun Sharma	
Star Guild Awards	Best Performance In A Comic Role	Won	Varun Sharma (Choocha)	
Star Guild Awards	Best Female Singer	Nominated	Sona Mohapatra ("Ambarsariya")	

== Sequel ==
On 30 January 2016, a sequel to the film was announced, featuring the original cast and directed by Lamba and produced by Excel Entertainment. Filming began in August 2016 in Delhi. The film was released on 8 December 2017.

A threequel titled Fukrey 3 commenced shooting on 13 March 2022 with the cast of the previous two films reprising their roles and Mrighdeep Singh Lamba as the director. The film was released on 28 September 2023.

== Animated series ==
An animated series for kids, titled as Fukrey Boyzzz, jointly produced by Excel Entertainment and Discovery Kids India, premiered on 12 October 2019 on Discovery Kids India, which showcases the animated avatars of popular characters Hunny, Choocha, Laali, and Bholi Punjaban, along with other characters. Fukrey Boyzzz: Space Mein Fukrapanti, an Indian animated comedy film directed by Avinash Walzade was released in 2020 continuing from the series.

== See also ==
- List of Bollywood comedy films
