= Ritesh Sidhwani =

Indian film producer (b. 1973)

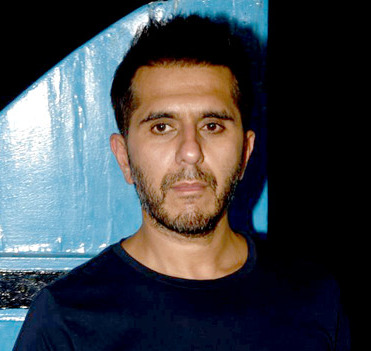
- Sidhwani in 2016
- Born: 1973 (age 53); Mumbai, Maharashtra, India
- Occupation: Film producer
- Years active: 2001–present
- Organization: Excel Entertainment
- Known for: Dil Chahta Hai (2001)
- Spouse: Dolly Sidhwani
- Children: 2

Ritesh Sidhwani (born 1973) is an Indian film producer. He is the co-founder of Excel Entertainment along with Farhan Akhtar. His first film as a producer, Dil Chahta Hai, won the National Awards in 2001. Through his vision, Excel Entertainment now is one of the first major Indian production companies in the over-the-top (OTT) content space.

Their first show Inside Edge (2017) was nominated for Best Drama series at 46th International Emmy Awards, followed by Mirzapur (2018) and Made in Heaven (2019).

His filmography covers a range of genres. Dil Dhadakne Do, Gully Boy, Don & Fukrey to name a few.

Sidhwani expanded Excel Entertainment's reach by establishing an exclusive division, Excel Media & Entertainment for web shows.

Their series Dahaad competed at the Berlinale International Film Festival, while Bambai Meri Jaan made history as the first Indian OTT series to premiere internationally in London.

Sidhwani won BAFTA Award in the category Best Children's & Family Film for producing Boong (2025).

== Early life ==
Ritesh Sidhwani was born in a Sindhi family in Mumbai, where he received his education. His father is Chandan Tootaram Sidhwani and mother is late Leelu Sidhwani.

== Personal life ==
He is married to Dolly Sidhwani, and the couple have two sons.

== Filmography ==
=== Films ===
Year	Film	Producer	Creative director	Executive producer	Film distributor
2001	Dil Chahta Hai	Yes	Yes		
2004	Lakshya	Yes	Yes		
2006	Don	Yes	Yes		
2007	Honeymoon Travels Pvt. Ltd.	Yes	Yes		
2007	Positive (Short Film)	Yes	Yes		
2008	Rock On!!	Yes	Yes		
2009	Luck By Chance	Yes	Yes		
2010	Karthik Calling Karthik	Yes	Yes		
2011	Game	Yes	Yes		
2011	Zindagi Na Milegi Dobara	Yes	Yes		
2011	Don 2	Yes	Yes		
2012	Talaash	Yes	Yes		
2013	Fukrey	Yes	Yes		
2015	Dil Dhadakne Do	Yes	Yes		
2015	Bangistan	Yes	Yes		
2016	Baar Baar Dekho	Yes	Yes		
2016	Rock On 2	Yes	Yes		
2017	Raees	Yes	Yes		
2017	Fukrey Returns	Yes	Yes		
2018	3 Storeys	Yes	Yes		
2018	Gold	Yes	Yes		
2018	K.G.F: Chapter 1				Yes
2019	Gully Boy	Yes	Yes		
2019	Sye Raa Narasimha Reddy				Yes
2021	Hello Charlie	Yes			
2021	Toofan	Yes			
2022	Sharmaji Namkeen	Yes			
2022	K.G.F: Chapter 2				Yes
2022	Phone Bhoot	Yes			
2023	Friday Night Plan	Yes			
2023	Fukrey 3	Yes			
2023	Kho Gaye Hum Kahan	Yes			
2024	Madgaon Express	Yes			
2024	Boong	Yes			
2024	Yudhra	Yes			
2024	Agni	Yes			
2025	Ground Zero	Yes			
2026	Mirzapur	Yes			
TBD	Jee Le Zaraa †	Yes			

=== Web series ===
Year	Film	Producer	Creative director	Executive producer
2017	Inside Edge	Yes		Yes
2018	Mirzapur	Yes	Yes	Yes
2019	Made In Heaven	Yes	Yes	Yes
2019	Inside Edge 2	Yes		Yes
2020	Mirzapur 2	Yes	Yes	Yes
2021	Inside Edge 3	Yes		Yes
2022	Eternally Confused and Eager for Love	Yes		Yes
2023	Dahaad	Yes		Yes
2023	Bambai Meri Jaan	Yes		Yes
2023	Made In Heaven 2	Yes	Yes	Yes
2024	Mirzapur 3	Yes	Yes	Yes
2025	Dabba Cartel	Yes		Yes
2025	Andhera	Yes		Yes
TBA	Mirzapur 4	Yes	Yes	Yes

== Awards ==
Year	Film	Awards	Category	Ref.
2002	Dil Chahta Hai	49th National Film Awards	Best Feature Film in Hindi	
2002	Dil Chahta Hai	47th Filmfare Awards	Critics Award for Best Movie	
2009	Rock On!!	55th National Film Awards	Best Feature Film in Hindi	
2011	Zindagi Na Milegi Dobara	Indian Television Academy Awards	ITA Scroll of entertainment	
2012	Zindagi Na Milegi Dobara	7th NDTV Indian of the Year Awards	NDTV Entertainer of the Year	
2012	Zindagi Na Milegi Dobara	57th Filmfare Awards	Best Film	
2012	Zindagi Na Milegi Dobara	57th Filmfare Awards	Critics Award for Best Movie	
2012	Zindagi Na Milegi Dobara	Screen Awards	Best Film	
2012	Zindagi Na Milegi Dobara	Apsara Awards	Best Film	
2012	Zindagi Na Milegi Dobara	Zee Cine Awards	Best Film	
2012	Zindagi Na Milegi Dobara	13th IIFA Awards	Best Movie	
2019	Gully Boy	Screen Awards	Best Film	
2019	Gully Boy	Filmfare Awards	Best Film	
2019	Gully Boy	Zee Cine Awards	Best Film	
2019	Gully Boy	Indian Film Festival of Melbourne	Best Film	
2019	Gully Boy	Bucheon International Fantastic Film Festival	NETPAC Award for Best Asian Film	
2019	Mirzapur	iReel Awards	Best Drama Series	
2026	Boong	BAFTA	Best Children's and Family Film	
