= Jia Aur Jia =

Jia Aur Jia doc
- Directed by: Howard Rosemeyer
- Written by: Mudassar Aziz
- Screenplay by: Farahjaan Sheikh
- Produced by: Mirza Askari; Dhaval Bhadra; Vibha Raj; Amit Ramgopal; Vishal Gurnani
- Starring: Richa Chadda; Kalki Koechlin; Arslan Goni
- Cinematography: Shakil Khan
- Edited by: Prashant S. Rathore; Sandeep Kurup
- Music by: (Songs); Nisschal Zaveri; Sachin Gupta (Background Music); Sameer Nichani
- Distributed by: Bluefox Motion Pictures
- Release date: 27 October 2017
- Running time: 92 minutes
- Country: India
- Language: Hindi
- Box office: ₹87 lakh

Jia Aur Jia (transl. Jia and Jia) is a 2017 Indian Hindi-language road film directed by Howard Rosemeyer. It stars Richa Chadda and Kalki Koechlin. The film is about how Jia teaches Jia how to live.

== Cast ==
- Richa Chadda as Jia Venkatram
- Kalki Koechlin as Jia Grewal
- Arslan Goni as Vasu Krishna
- Badheka Harsh as Siddharth
- Zarina Wahab as Jia Grewal's mother
- Sudhanshu Pandey as Arvind Jaisingh

== Production ==
Jia Aur Jia is the directorial debut of Howard Rosmeyer. Principal photography for the film took place in Sweden.

== Soundtrack ==
Jia Aur Jia

Soundtrack album by Sachin Gupta, Nisschal Zaveri & Sameer Nichani
- Released: 17 October 2017
- Genre: Feature film soundtrack
- Label: Zee Music Company

Tracklist
No.	Title	Lyrics	Music	Singer(s)	Length
1.	"Na Shukre"	Mudassar Aziz	Sachin Gupta	Smita Malhotra	02:05
2.	"Nach Basanti"	Mudassar Aziz	Sachin Gupta	Shivangi Bhayana	02:51
3.	"Na Jaa By Nandini"	Raqeeb Alam	Nisschal Zaveri	Nandini Srikar	04:56
4.	"Jia Aur Jia Theme"		Sameer Nichani & Amey Ghule		01:23
5.	"Na Jaa"	Raqeeb Alam	Nisschal Zaveri	Asees Kaur	04:56
Total length:					16:06
