= Penalty (2019 film) =

2019 Indian sports film

- Directed by: Shubham Singh
- Written by: Akhilesh Choudhary, Sparsh Khetarpal, Shubham Singh, Tasha Bhambra
- Starring: Lukram Smil, Kay Kay Menon, Manjot Singh, Shashank Arora, Bijou Thaangjam
- Cinematography: Mateusz Zolebiewski
- Music by: Siddhant Madhav & Mannan Munjal
- Production company: Rudrakshh Films
- Release date: 19 July 2019
- Running time: 118 minutes
- Country: India

Penalty is a 2019 Indian sports film about a football lover Lukram from Manipur. The movie stars Kay Kay Menon alongside debutant Lukram Smil in lead roles. It is directed by Shubham Singh.

== Plot ==
Lukram (Lukram Smil), a football aspirant from Manipur, registers in a college in Lucknow named SRMU, as it is well known for producing International level footballers. His roommate Ishwar Singh (Manjot Singh), is a forward in the university team and helps Lukram get into the trials. He impresses the assistant coach Parth (Shashank Arora) who recommends him for the final eleven. However, Lukram faces discrimination from other players and officials due to his North East origin. Discouraged, he goes back to his native village. After counselling from his former coach, he returns and joins another team, the Street Club. This club had Chandan (Akash Dabhade) as coach and his team consisted of underprivileged, but talented players. Lukram showcases his brilliance in an exhibition match against the college team, and finally convinces the team manager Vikram Singh (Kay Kay Menon), who has always been against "Outsiders" in the team, to reinstate him into the college team.

== Cast ==
- Lukram Smil as himself
- Kay Kay Menon as Vikram Singh
- Aakash Dabhade as Jugadu a.k.a. Chandan
- Shashank Arora as Parth
- Manjot Singh as Ishwar
- Tasha Bhambra as Pooja
- Bijou Thaangjam as Bijou
- Rajib Kro as Lukram father

== See also ==
- Goal (2007 film)
- Football Champion
- Jada (2019 film)
