= Fukrey 3 =

2023 Indian film by Mrighdeep Singh Lamba

- Theatrical release poster
- Directed by: Mrighdeep Singh Lamba
- Written by: Vipul Vig
- Produced by: Farhan Akhtar; Ritesh Sidhwani
- Starring: Pulkit Samrat; Varun Sharma; Manjot Singh; Richa Chadha; Pankaj Tripathi
- Cinematography: Amalendu Chaudhary
- Edited by: Manan Ashwin Mehta
- Music by: Songs: Tanishk Bagchi; Abhishek Nailwal; Sumeet Bellary; Score: Abhishek Nailwal
- Production company: Excel Entertainment
- Distributed by: AA Films
- Release date: 28 September 2023
- Running time: 147 minutes
- Country: India
- Language: Hindi
- Box office: ₹128.37 crore

Fukrey 3 is a 2023 Indian Hindi-language comedy film directed by Mrighdeep Singh Lamba and produced by Farhan Akhtar and Ritesh Sidhwani under the banner of Excel Entertainment. The film is the third installment of the Fukrey franchise and the sequel to Fukrey Returns (2017). It stars an ensemble cast of Pulkit Samrat, Varun Sharma, Manjot Singh, Richa Chadha, and Pankaj Tripathi.

Fukrey 3 was released theatrically on 28 September 2023.

== Plot ==
Sometime after the Government of Delhi gives a store named "Janta Store" to Hunny, Choocha, Lali, and Pandit, (Note: As depicted in Fukrey Returns (2017)) the store is now in shambles and the Fukras are earning by doing small jobs. Meanwhile, Bholi Punjaban wants to stand in election for Water Section of Delhi and is backed by water supplier Dhingra, a corrupt businessman who also owns a waterpark. Bholi cleans a public toilet to gain the attention of poor people, but a small deed by Choocha at the same spot, wins the people's hearts.

In one of her rallies, Bholi mentions eradication of water mafia in Delhi and free water for public, but Dhingra wants to control the entire water facilitation of Delhi and is backing Bholi for the same reason. Hunny, Pandit, and Lali decide to contest Choocha in the election as he is gaining public attention due to his antics. However, Choocha blurts out the plan to Bholi, who decides a counter plan to send Choocha and the Fukras to South Africa with her two bodyguards, Eddie and Bobby, to Shinda's Diamond mine in the Eastern Cape. Choocha is offered money to use his Deja-Chu on the mine to find diamonds in the mine. Shinda's niece Mombasa falls in love with Choocha in South Africa, oblivious that Choocha only has eyes for Bholi. 10 days later, Choocha does not get Deja-Chu, where Hunny realizes Bholi's plan and decides to escape from South Africa.

Choocha has a Deja-Chu at the moment and decides to dig at the spot, where the group find a diamond and are caught by Mombasa. By mistake, Choocha, who had hid the diamond in his mouth, ingests the diamond after hearing Mombasa's deal of letting the group go in exchange for the diamond and her marrying Choocha, and following death threats from zama zamas, all four of them escape to an abandoned amusement park. While spending the night there, Choocha and Hunny face a dangerous electric shock after Choocha grabs an exposed wire in his sleep and are severely dehydrated. Pandit and Lali revive them with water and Choocha urinates in a small bowl. Hunny is sweating profusely and Pandit cleans him up in the same bowl. Lali discards the bowl's contents in a pit. When Pandit lights a cigarette and throws the matchstick in the pit, it combusts creating a small flame. The next morning, they once again try creating the same mixture and it combusts again, meaning hydrogen from Hunny's sweat and carbon from Choocha's diamond ingested urine are creating a fuel-like substance. Pandit takes a video of the miracle.

They return to India and Choocha now once again participates in the election by promising cheap fuel to everyone, winning the public's support. Bholi devises a plan to fake her marriage with Bobby in Choocha's presence, but Choocha blurts out his new god given gift to Bholi. Bholi marries Choocha instead and sends the pictures of their marriage to the Fukras. Choocha gets kidnapped by Dhingra's goons soon after. Shinda also comes to India to retrieve his diamond and marry Mombasa to Choocha. The next day, thinking Bholi kidnapped Choocha, Hunny and the others confront Bholi, who puts forward a deal wherein they get equal partnership and profits and Bholi backs out of the election. Dhingra notices something fishy, and attempts to kill Choocha, but Bholi saves him by giving up Choocha's gift to Dhingra.

Dhingra wants proof of the thing and gets all the Fukras together and sees Pandit's video. He stops the water supply to entire Delhi and decides to give water in abundance to produce cheap fuel. This water shortage leads to a fight between Dhingra's men and the poor people which leads to Dhingra's men driving a truck over a poor school student. This news is covered sensationally and it leads to the Fukras deciding to move against Dhingra. Eddie is also moved by the incident and decides to support the Fukras and makes sure Bobby supports them too. They go against Dhingra, who captures them all. He suspends Pandit and Lali over a crocodile infested water pool, Hunny in a knight suit so he sweats profusely and Bholi and Choocha on ice blocks while being hung, to make Choocha urinate.

It is revealed that when Eddie's heart had changed, he helped the Fukras record a video revealing Dhingra's real plan and their location of capture. The crowd breaks through the water park and stomp over Dhingra and saves the rest of the Fukras. Mombasa confesses her one sided love for Choocha. Hunny and Pandit still save a dying Dhingra by getting water for him. Choocha wins the election by a landslide, but his marriage with Bholi is not accepted at Choocha's home. The Fuel Minister of Bangalore calls the Fukras to Bangalore, but when they arrive, Choocha's pee and Hunny's sweat do not turn into petrol; Choocha hadn't taken a dump since South Africa and did so in the flight to Bangalore, upon his excretion, Zafar, who is in Goa, finds the diamond which dropped from the Fukras' flight. The film ends with Choocha getting chased by everybody.

== Cast ==
- Pulkit Samrat as Vikas "Hunny" Gulati
- Varun Sharma as Dilip "Choocha" Singh
- Manjot Singh as Lali Halwai
- Richa Chadha as Bholi Punjaban / Phoolkumari Sehgal
- Pankaj Tripathi as Narayan Pandit "Panditji"
- Manu Rishi Chadha as Shunda Singh Ahluwalia
- Anupam Kher as Chuski Sir
- Ali Fazal in a cameo appearance as Zafar Khan
- Amit Dhawan as Dhingra
- Anngad Raaj and underwear kid
- Purnendu Bhattacharya as CM Brijmohan
- Geeta Agrawal Sharma as Prakash Kaur, Shunda's wife
- Natasha Kamwenje as Mombasa, Shunda's niece
- Michael Obodike as Eddie, Bholi's henchman
- Lucas Ogunro as Bobby, Bholi's henchman
- Shubham Dongare as Bittu
- Lekha Prajapati as Air Hostess
- Nitanshi Goel as Baawli
- Twarita Nagar in a special appearance in the song "Ve Fukrey"
- Juhi Bhatt in a special appearance in the song "Ve Fukrey"
- Sanchi Rai in a special appearance in the song "Ve Fukrey"
- Urvashi Rautela in a cameo appearance as Sharvari Yadav

== Production ==
Principal photography commenced in March 2022. Production wrapped in June 2022.

== Music ==
Fukrey 3

Soundtrack album by Tanishk Bagchi, Sumeet Bellary and Abhishek Nailwal
- Released: 27 September 2023
- Recorded: 2022
- Genre: Feature film soundtrack
- Length: 12:57
- Language: Hindi
- Label: Zee Music Company

Official audio
- Fukrey 3 - Full Album on YouTube

The music of the film is composed by Tanishk Bagchi, Sumeet Bellary and Abhishek Nailwal. Lyrics are written by Kumaar, Shabbir Ahmed and Abhishek Nailwal.

The first single titled "Ve Fukrey" was released on 11 September 2023.

Track listing
No.	Title	Lyrics	Music	Singer(s)	Length
1.	"Ve Fukrey"	Shabbir Ahmed	Tanishk Bagchi	Dev Negi, Romy, Asees Kaur	2:40
2.	"Mashoor"	Abhishek Nailwal, Mrighdeep Singh Lamba	Abhishek Nailwal	Abhishek Nailwal	3:09
3.	"Sahi Hai"	Abhishek Nailwal	Abhishek Nailwal	Abhishek Nailwal	2:31
4.	"Macha Re"	Kumaar	Tanishk Bagchi	Mika Singh, Nakash Aziz	2:02
5.	"Atrangi Kissa"	Vipul Vig	Sumeet Bellary	Gandhharv Sachdeva, Divya Kumar	2:35
Total length:					12:57

== Release ==
=== Theatrical ===
Fukrey 3 was released theatrically on 28 September 2023.

=== Home media ===
The film was premiered on Amazon Prime Video from 23 November 2023.

== Reception ==
=== Critical response ===
On the review aggregator website Rotten Tomatoes, 44% of 9 critics' reviews are positive, with an average rating of 4.7/10.

Bollywood Hungama awarded the film 4/5 stars and wrote "Fukrey 3 is a well-packaged entertainer that works due to the crazy and hilarious script and the strong brand value."

=== Box office ===
On its opening day, Fukrey 3 collected a total India net of ₹8.82 crore (US$920,000).

As of 19 October 2023, the film has grossed ₹115.06 crore (US$12 million) in India, with a further ₹13.31 crore (US$1.4 million) in overseas, for a worldwide total of ₹128.37 crore (US$13 million).
