= Fukrey Returns =

2017 Indian film by Mrighdeep Singh Lamba

- Theatrical release poster
- Directed by: Mrighdeep Singh Lamba
- Written by: Vipul Vig; Mrighdeep Singh Lamba
- Produced by: Farhan Akhtar; Ritesh Sidhwani
- Starring: Pulkit Samrat; Manjot Singh; Ali Fazal; Varun Sharma; Priya Anand; Vishakha Singh; Pankaj Tripathi; Rajiv Gupta; Richa Chadda
- Cinematography: Andre Menezes
- Edited by: Dev Rao Jadhav
- Music by: Songs: Shaarib-Toshi; Sumeet Bellary; Prem-Hardeep; Jasleen Royal; Gulraj Singh; Shree D Ishq Bector; Score: Sameer Uddin
- Production company: Excel Entertainment
- Distributed by: AA Films
- Release date: 8 December 2017
- Running time: 141 minutes
- Country: India
- Budget: ₹22 crore
- Box office: ₹112.30 crore

Fukrey Returns (transl. Slackers Return) is a 2017 Indian Hindi-language comedy film directed by Mrighdeep Singh Lamba and produced by Farhan Akhtar and Ritesh Sidhwani. It is a sequel to the 2013 film Fukrey. The film stars Pulkit Samrat, Manjot Singh, Ali Fazal, Varun Sharma, Priya Anand, Vishakha Singh, Pankaj Tripathi, Rajiv Gupta, and Richa Chadda. Fukrey Returns was released on 8 December 2017.

== Plot ==
After their admission into college, life in Delhi is enjoyable for Vikas "Hunny" Gulati, Dilip "Choocha" Singh, Lali Halwai, and Zafar Khan. Hunny and Zafar are dating Priya and Neetu, respectively, planning to marry them. However, things take a drastic turn when Bholi Punjaban is released from prison after a year. She sends her henchmen to track the quartet down. The quartet is kidnapped and brought to an underground parking along with their acquaintance, Panditji. There, Bholi questions them about their plan to deceive her, and as the quartet tries to convince her, she provides them with one chance and invests some money in order to open a lottery shop for them. People are provided with numbers to which they invest some money. Choocha begins to distribute brochures around the city and more people invest. Meanwhile, respected minister Babulal Bhatia who belongs to Janta Vikas Party, argues with the Delhi chief minister, Brijmohan, over the next election and challenges him to win. The police around the city conduct raids on drugs and fake lottery shops. After discovering the quartet's shop, Babulal orders the lottery to change the winning number Choocha received from his dream, and all the investors are enraged. As a result, the public gathers around to attack the quartet, but they all escape by jumping off a bridge into the river. They regain consciousness at a construction area, where they later summon Panditji as well.

Here, Choocha discovers that he has a new ability to see the future. In this ability, he witnesses a tiger in a cave along with many boxes, which the quartet and Panditji believe to contain treasure. The group is later captured by Bholi, who is enraged due to their foolishness and orders her henchmen to kill them, but Choocha's newfound ability impresses her and she forgives them. Moreover, Bholi orders them to find the treasure to which they agree if she releases them. Meanwhile, Babulal fears that the investors will recover their money, so he arranges the quartet's stay at an upper-class hotel. Panditji is also sent in disguise to keep an eye on them. At dinner, the quartet are forced to take an oath to help Babulal for their welfare in return. The next day, the quartet takes the blame instead of Babulal who misused the investors' money, while Bholi visits Brijmohan to hand over some factory documents related to Babulal. After the quartet departs happily, the police arrive and raid all the lottery shops in Delhi. The quartet return home and see the disappointment in their loved ones. They decide to scheme up to earn more money. Eventually, at Panditji's house, Choocha is forced to see a dream where Lali holds a tiger cub.

Meanwhile, Babulal discovers Bholi's plan and ambushes her warehouse, holding Bholi herself at gunpoint. However, he forgives her murder on the pretext to find the treasure. For the mission, Bholi calls Hunny, who requests for the tiger cub she sold. The next morning, the quartet, Panditji, and Bholi return to the zoo, where they are all joined by Priya and Neetu. The group digs a hole and enters a cave underground where they are witnessed by the cub's mother. However, after escaping, they are unexpectedly led to a factory warehouse with huge stack of illegal goods. They learns that the products are worth ₹400 million. Bholi summons Babulal to the factory as well, only to discover that the warehouse actually contains Babulal's trade inventory. He is enraged and orders his henchmen to kill the group, but in a surprising twist, the police arrive at the scene with Brijmohan, as while estimating the value of the goods, Zafar had already called the police after discovering that Babulal had purchased the products from China. After Babulal is arrested and charged by the police, Brijmohan felicitates the group, and Choocha proposes to Bholi to which she responds with a kiss, amusing everyone. Later, the quartet inaugurates an electronics shop with the products they discovered in the warehouse. The film ends with Hunny, Zafar, and Choocha marrying Priya, Neetu, and Bholi, respectively, in Goa.

== Cast ==
- Pulkit Samrat as Vikas Gulati aka Hunny: Lali, Zafar and Choocha's best friend and Priya's boyfriend
- Manjot Singh as Lali Halwai: Billa's son and Hunny, Zafar and Choocha's best friend
- Ali Fazal as Zafar Khan: Lali, Hunny and Choocha's best friend and Neetu's husband
- Varun Sharma as Dilip Singh aka Choocha: Hunny, Zafar and Lali's best friend and Bholi's love interest
- Priya Anand as Priya Sharma: Hunny's girlfriend
- Vishakha Singh as Neetu Singh: Zafar's girlfriend-turned-wife
- Pankaj Tripathi as Narayan Pandit "Panditji"
- Rajiv Gupta as Minister Babulal Bhatia
- Richa Chaddha as Bholi Punjaban: a former gangster; Choocha's love interest
- Nalneesh Neel as Mangu
- Sanjana Sanghi as Katty
- Pallavi Batra as Namita (hotel receptionist)
- Purnendu Bhattacharya as Brijmohan (Delhi Chief Minister)
- V S Prince Ratan as News Reporter
- Ishtiyak Khan as Tiddey
- Ashok Pathak as Smackiya
- Neelu Kohli as Choocha's mother
- Chittaranjan Tripathy as Eunuch
- Shreekant Verma as Babulal P.A.
- Raj Sharma as Music Composer
- Nataša Stanković in a special appearance in the song "Mehbooba"

== Production ==
On 30 January 2016, a sequel to Fukrey was announced, featuring the original cast, again directed by Lamba and produced by Excel Entertainment. Filming began in August 2016 in Delhi.

== Soundtrack ==
Fukrey Returns

Soundtrack album by Shaarib-Toshi, Sumeet Bellary, Prem-Hardeep, Jasleen Royal, Gulraj Singh, Shree D and Ishq Bector
- Released: 16 November 2017
- Genre: Feature film soundtrack
- Length: 25:25
- Language: Hindi
- Label: Zee Music Company

Singles from Fukrey Returns
- 1. "Mehbooba" Released: 15 November 2017

The music of the film is composed by Shaarib-Toshi, Sumeet Bellary, Prem-Hardeep, Jasleen Royal, Gulraj Singh, Shree D and Ishq Bector while the lyrics have been penned by Kumaar, Satya Khare, Aditya Sharma, Shree D, Mrighdeep Singh Lamba, Vipul Vig and Raftaar. The first track of the film titled as "Mehbooba" which is sung by Neha Kakkar, Yasser Desai, Mohammed Rafi and rapped by Raftaar was released on 15 November 2017. The soundtrack was released by Zee Music Company on 16 November 2017.

Track listing
| No. | Title | Lyrics | Music | Singers(s) | Length |
|---|---|---|---|---|---|
| 1. | "Mehbooba" | Kumaar | Prem-Hardeep | Mohammed Rafi, Neha Kakkar, Yasser Desai, Raftaar | 2:59 |
| 2. | "Peh Gaya Khalara" | Aditya Sharma | Jasleen Royal | Divya Kumar, Jasleen Royal, Akasa Singh, Akanksha Bhandari | 3:00 |
| 3. | "Tu Mera Bhai Nahi Hai" | Satya Khare, Raftaar | Sumeet Bellary | Gandharv Sachdev, Raftaar | 2:37 |
| 4. | "Ishq De Fanniyar" (Male) | Kumaar | Shaarib-Toshi | Shaarib-Toshi | 2:58 |
| 5. | "Ishq De Fanniyar" (Female) | Kumaar | Shaarib-Toshi | Jyotica Tangri | 2:58 |
| 6. | "Fukrey Returns" | Kumaar | Gulraj Singh | Siddharth Mahadevan, Shannon Donald, Gulraj Singh | 2:57 |
| 7. | "Raina" | Shree D | Shree D, Ishq Bector | Shree D | 4:36 |
| 8. | "Bura Na Mano Bholi Hai" | Satya Khare, Mrighdeep Singh Lamba, Vipul Vig | Sumeet Bellary | Gandharv Sachdev, Shahid Mallya | 3:20 |
| Total length: | | | | | 25:25 |

== Critical reception ==
The film met with mixed reviews from critics. On the review aggregator website Rotten Tomatoes, 11% of 9 critics' reviews are positive, with an average rating of 4/10.

Times of India gave it a rating of 3.5/5. Koimoi gave it a rating of 3.5/5 and wrote, "Retains the magic of the first part". Bollywood Hungama gave it a rating of 3 stars out of 5 and wrote, "Fukrey Returns begins on a great note but then turns silly and unconvincing becoming a fun, clean film that works despite the illogical and slightly unconvincing plot." Deccan Chronicle gave it a rating of 3 stars out of 5 and wrote, "Choocha's hilarious act saves this gritty comedy." Kriti Tulsiani of News18 gave the film a rating of 2 out of 5 and said that, "Watch Fukrey Returns if you like but don’t expect the spark of the original. Plus, the giggles are more like a reminder of the original Fukrey and nothing more." Rohit Vats of Hindustan Times gave the film a rating of 1.5 out of 5 saying that, "Blame it on the success of the original or the four-year-gap between the two films, Fukrey Returns isn’t even a patch on Fukrey. Fukrey Returns is a tedious 141-minute watch which is unfunny, unintelligent and repetitive." Namrata Joshi of The Hindu said that, "The novelty and freshness of sleeper hit ‘Fukrey’ wear down drastically in the sequel." Shubhra Gupta of The Indian Express gave the film a rating of 1.5 out of 5 and said that, "This Pulkit Samrat and Varun Sharma starrer is relentlessly juvenile. The situations are so tired and contrived there’s nothing that even such capable hands as Richa Chadha and Pankaj Tripathi can do, to retain our interest." Saibal Chatterjee of NDTV gave the film a rating of 2 out of 5 and said that, "Fukrey Returns comes nowhere near being the rip-roaring ride that the 2013 sleeper hit Fukrey. For a film that aspires to be a full-on laugh riot, Fukrey Returns is a bit of a trudge."

Rachit Gupta of Filmfare gave the film a rating of 2 out of 5 and said that, "Fukrey Returns is a sequel that wants to be bigger, better and funnier than the original. In all fairness, it does manage to fulfil its ambitions on two accounts. It is bigger, it is funnier but it's certainly not better." Uday Bhatia of LiveMint wasn't impressed with the movie and said that, "Fukrey was rooted in the everyday: the comedy seemed to arise naturally from the slackers’ surroundings. The sequel, though, has the desperation and unfocussed energy of a work that's not sure why it exists." Sukanya Verma of Rediff gave the film a rating of 2 out of 5 and said that Fukrey Returns is "a clumsily conceived sequel, a foolhardy endeavour to milk a fluke, an outright bore". Suhani Singh of India Today felt that the "film has little apart from Varun Sharma" and gave it a rating of 1.5 out of 5.

== Sequel ==
A sequel titled Fukrey 3 releasing on 28 September 2023 with the cast of the previous two films minus Ali Fazal, reprising their roles and Mrighdeep Singh Lamba as the director.
