= Pulkit Samrat =

Indian actor (born 1983)

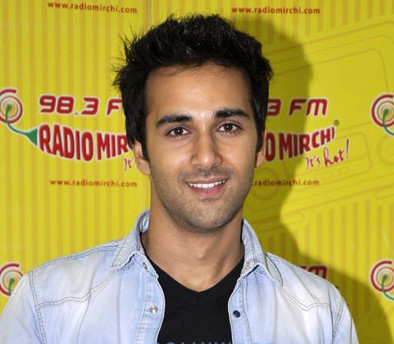
- Samrat promoting Fukrey in 2013
- Born: 29 December 1983 (age 42); Delhi, India
- Occupations: Actor; model
- Years active: 2006–present
- Spouses: Shweta Rohira (m. 2014; div. 2015) Kriti Kharbanda (m. 2024)

Pulkit Samrat (born 29 December 1983) is an Indian actor who primarily works in Hindi films along with Hindi television. Best known for playing "Hunny" in the Fukrey film series, Samrat made his acting debut with the series Kyunki Saas Bhi Kabhi Bahu Thi (2006) and made his film debut with Bittoo Boss (2012). He is a recipient of an Indian Telly Award.

Samrat had his first commercial success with Fukrey (2013). His highest grossing release came with Jai Ho (2014). This success was followed with a string of failures including Dolly Ki Doli (2015) and Sanam Re (2016), causing a setback. He later received praises for starring in Fukrey Returns (2017), 3 Storeys (2018) and Taish (2020). His highest grossing release came with Fukrey 3 (2023).

In addition to his acting career, Samrat is a prominent celebrity endorser for brands and products. Samrat is married to actress Kriti Kharbanda.

== Early life ==
Samrat was born on 29 December 1983 and brought up in a Punjabi family in Delhi, where his family has its real estate business. He studied at Manav Sthali School, and completed his schooling from Montfort Senior Secondary School, Ashok Vihar, Delhi.

He joined an advertising course at Apeejay Institute of Design, Delhi. However, after studying for five months, he received a modelling assignment. Thereafter, he quit his education and moved to Mumbai, where he joined an acting course run by Kishore Namit Kapoor.

== Career ==
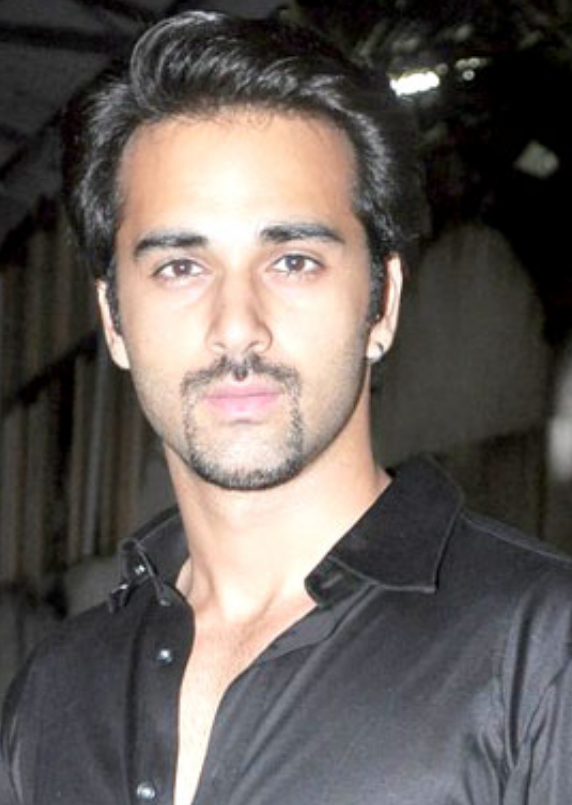
Samrat in 2015

=== Television career (2006–2008) ===
Samrat moved to Mumbai in 2005, and made his acting debut in 2006 with the long-running television show by Balaji Telefilms, Kyunki Saas Bhi Kabhi Bahu Thi. He portrayed Laksh Virani opposite Mouni Roy and Tia Bajpai. This got him his first recognition, and he won Indian Telly Award for Fresh New Face - Male for his performance. Samrat quit the show in 2007.

In 2008, he appeared as a Contestant on Kaho Na Yaar Hai with Roy, marking his final television appearance. In 2011, Samrat appeared as the lead in choreographer Vaibhavi Merchant's musical theatrical Taj Express.

=== Film breakthrough and setback (2012–2016) ===
Samrat made his film debut with romantic comedy Bitto Boss in 2012. He played the role of a wedding videographer from Punjab, alongside Amita Pathak. Times of India noted, "With a character sketch, screen-name and styling so reminiscent of Ranveer Singh, debutant Pulkit Samrat has little scope to create his own identity. However, he pulls off the small-town-munda act with sincerity, and a natural ease." He next played the lead role of Hunny in the ensemble comedy film Fukrey, opposite Priya Anand. The film emerged as a Sleeper hit. Anupama Chopra wrote, "The characters and actors are a perfect match. Pulkit embodies the over-confident charmer Hunny."

In 2014, he had two releases. He first appeared in Jai Ho in the role of a Police Inspector. It became his highest grossing release and collected ₹195.04 crore. He next played the lead in O Teri, opposite Sarah Jane Dias. It met with negative reviews but Bollywood Hungama mentioned, "Pulkit Samrat is pitch-perfect in his part. He seems to be getting better with every film."

In his first release of 2015, Samrat portrayed Inspector Robin Singh in Dolly Ki Doli opposite Sonam Kapoor. Firstpost said, "Samrat's face is pretty enough, but has no expression and he does a godawful Haryanvi accent that's all the more jarring because Rao's is pitch perfect." He next appeared Bangistan with Riteish Deshmukh. It received negative reviews. Samrat had two releases in 2016 too, both opposite Yami Gautam. He first appeared in Sanam Re, and next appeared in Junooniyat. Both these films received negative reviews and were box-office failures.

=== Recent work and expansion (2017-present) ===
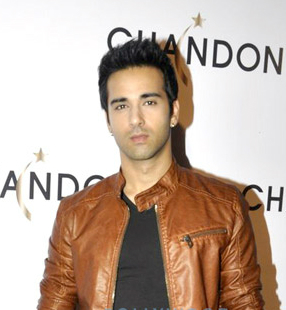
Samrat in 2017

Samrat's career marked a turning point in 2017 when he starred in the second instalment of Fukrey titled Fukrey Returns. The film was a box office success. News 18 mentioned that Samrat portrays the "same old confident Hunny" well. In 2018, Samrat first played Veer Arora in the romantic comedy Veerey Ki Wedding opposite Kriti Kharbanda. Hindustan Times wrote, "Pulkit Samrat as always, portrays himself as an extension of Salman Khan. He appears comfortable displaying his brawn and swag but emotes poorly, making no impact at all." Later that year, he played Vilas Naik in the independent drama film 3 Storeys. Times of India mentions that Samrat is "competent" in his role,

His only release in 2019 was Anees Bazmee's Pagalpanti, alongside Kharbanda. Bollywood Hungama mentions, "Pulkit Samrat tries his best but doesn’t succeed in giving the performance that his character demanded." In 2020, he starred as Sunny Lalwani in the thriller drama film Taish directed by Bejoy Nambiar, which was released on ZEE5 on 29 October 2020. Times of India noted, "Pulkit Samrat’s put in some serious efforts to render justice to Sunny’s trauma-fuelled anger; he is good when he’s mad and unconvincing when he’s happy, and that’s a problem." Scroll cited, "Pulkit Samrat and Harshvardhan Rane swagger about and clench fists and jawlines."

Samrat had only one release in 2021, the nature film Haathi Mere Saathi where he portrayed the second lead. The film received negative reviews.

Samrat will next appear in the third instalment of Fukrey titled Fukrey 3. He will also appear in Suswagatam Khushamadeed opposite Isabelle Kaif.

== Personal life ==
Samrat married his girlfriend Shweta Rohira on 3 November 2014. Rohira is a rakhi-sister to actor Salman Khan. Khan was also involved in the promotion of Pulkit Samrat's debut film. The couple separated in November 2015. Samrat then dated actress Yami Gautam, his co-star in Sanam Re, but the couple eventually broke up in 2018.

Samrat met actress Kriti Kharbanda in 2018 and they eventually started dating in 2019. The couple has worked together in the films — Veerey Ki Wedding, Pagalpanti and Taish. After being in a relationship for five years, the couple got engaged in 2024. He married Kharbanda in a traditional Hindu wedding ceremony, on 15 March 2024, in Manesar, Haryana.

== Media image ==
Apart from acting, Samrat is an endorser for several brands and products including Coca-Cola and Bella Vita Organic. He is the brand ambassador of Pebble watches alongside Kriti Kharbanda. Samrat became the first Bollywood actor to bag an ad in Pakistan. He has subsequently featured in the Times of India's Most Desirable Men List. Samrat ranked 48th in 2019 and 23rd in 2020.

== Filmography ==
Key
†	Denotes films that have not yet been released

=== Films ===
Year	Title	Role	Notes	Ref.
2012	Bittoo Boss	Bittoo Boss		
2013	Fukrey	Vikas Gulati "Hunny"		
2014	Jai Ho	Inspector Abhay Rajput		
2014	O Teri	Prantabh Pratab (PP)		
2015	Dolly Ki Doli	Inspector Robin Singh		
2015	Bangistan	Praveen Chaturvedi / Allahrakha Khan		
2016	Sanam Re	Akash Bill		
2016	Junooniyat	Captain Jahan Bakshi		
2017	Fukrey Returns	Vikas Gulati "Hunny"		
2018	Veerey Ki Wedding	Veer		
2018	3 Storeys	Vilas Naik		
2019	Pagalpanti	Chandrakanth "Chandu"		
2020	Taish	Sunny Lalwani		
2021	Haathi Mere Saathi	Shankar	Acted only in Hindi version	
2022	Phone Bhoot	Hunny	Cameo appearance	
2023	Fukrey 3	Vikas Gulati "Hunny"		
2026	Rahu Ketu	Ketu		
2026	Cocktail 2	Anshul	Cameo appearance	
TBA	Suswagatam Khushamadeed †	Aman Sharma	Post-production	

=== Television/Web Series ===
Year	Title	Role	Notes	Ref.
2006–2007	Kyunki Saas Bhi Kabhi Bahu Thi	Laksh Virani		
2008	Kaho Na Yaar Hai	Contestant	Episode 6	
2019	Made in Heaven	Sarfaraz Khan	Episode: "Star Struck Lovers"	
2023	Made in Heaven	Sarfaraz Khan	Episode: "Love story"	
2026	Glory	Ravinder Singh		

== Awards and nominations ==
Year	Award	Category	Work	Result	Ref.
2006	Indian Telly Awards	Fresh New Face - Male	Kyunki Saas Bhi Kabhi Bahu Thi	Won	
