= Varun Sharma =

Indian actor and comedian (born 1990)

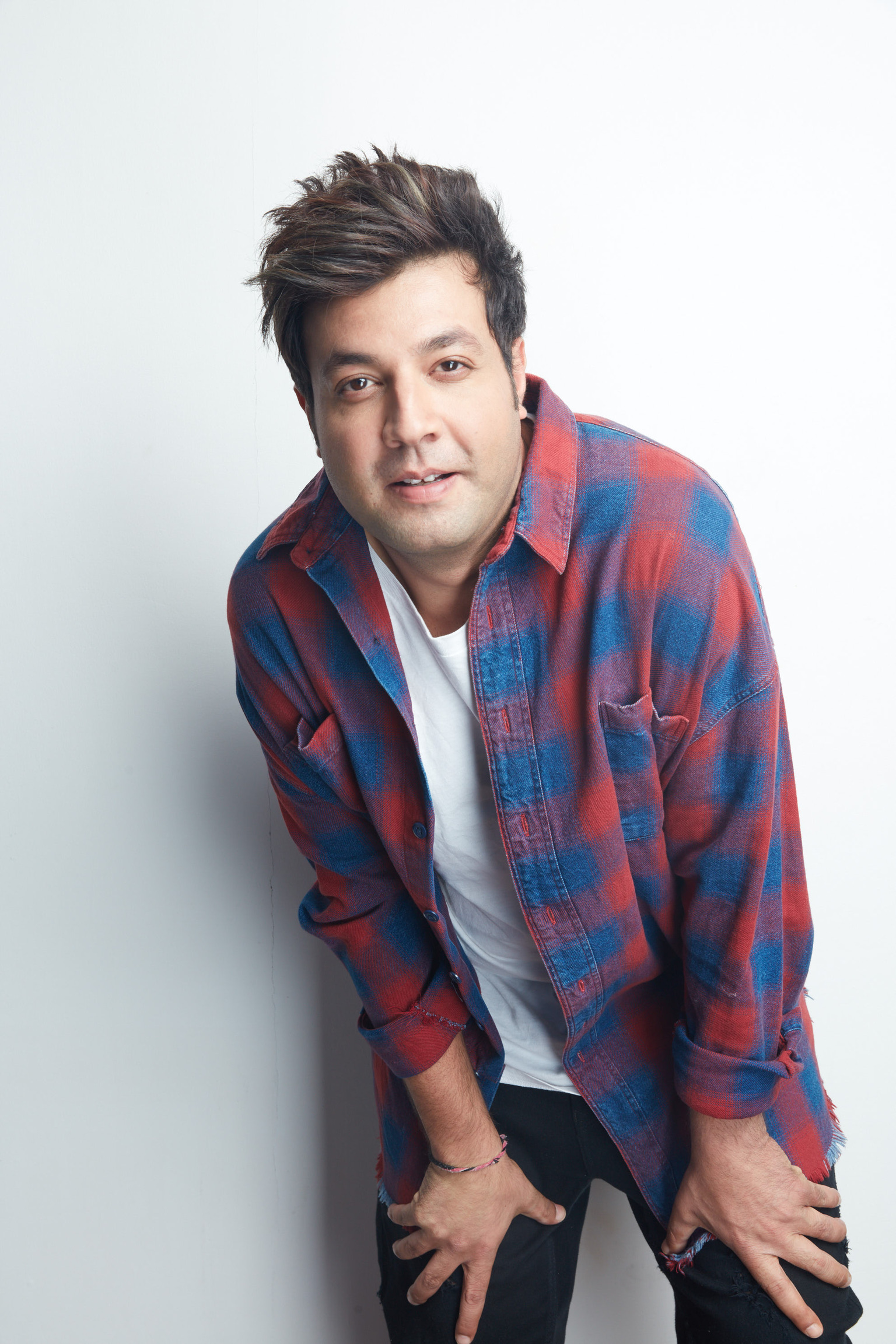
- Sharma in 2020
- Born: 4 February 1990 (age 36); Jalandhar, Punjab, India
- Education: The Lawrence School, Sanawar
- Occupations: Actor; comedian
- Years active: 2013–present

Varun Sharma (born 4 February 1990) is an Indian actor and comedian. He is best known for playing "Choocha" in the Fukrey film series. He has done comic as well as supporting roles in various Hindi and Punjabi films.

== Education ==
Sharma completed his education at The Lawrence School in Sanawar, later transferring to Apeejay School in Jalandhar to complete Class 11 and 12. He obtained a bachelor's degree in Media, Entertainment and Film Technology from ITFT Chandigarh.

== Career ==
In 2013, Sharma appeared in his first Bollywood film, the comedy-drama Fukrey, directed by Mrighdeep Singh Lamba. It emerged as a commercial success with earnings of ₹49 crore (US$8.9 million) worldwide.

In 2015, Sharma first appeared in Abhishek Dogra's comedy Dolly Ki Doli and successful romantic comedy Kis Kisko Pyaar Karoon, co-starring Kapil Sharma, came next. His final film of the year was Rohit Shetty's action romance Dilwale alongside Shah Rukh Khan, Varun Dhawan, Kajol, and Kriti Sanon, which broke several box office records and proved to be his highest-grossing release. The feature grossed over ₹4 billion (US$47 million) worldwide to emerge as one of Indian cinema's highest grossers.

Sharma starred alongside Kriti Sanon and Sushant Singh Rajput in Dinesh Vijan's reincarnation romance Raabta (2017). It received a negative response from critics and flopped at the box office. Later in 2017, Sharma starred in a sequel to Fukrey, entitled Fukrey Returns, which was a major box office success with a worldwide gross of ₹1 billion (US$12 million).

In 2018, he appeared briefly alongside Govinda in the comedy FryDay. In 2019, Sharma starred in Arjun Patiala alongside Sanon and Diljit Dosanjh, Khandaani Shafakhana alongside Sonakshi Sinha and Badshah, and Chhichhore alongside Sushant Singh Rajput and Shraddha Kapoor.

In 2020, Varun has also been seen as the host for Flipkart Video's (OTT video streaming platform owned by Flipkart) comedy show, Sab Se Funny Kaun.

His next film after that one was Roohi directed by Hardik Mehta and produced by Dinesh Vijan under the banner Maddock Films, which co-stars Rajkummar Rao and Janhvi Kapoor. It released in 2021.

== Filmography ==
Key
†	Denotes films and series that have not yet been released

Year	Film	Role	Notes
2013	Fukrey	Dilip "Choocha" Singh	Debut film
2013	Rabba Main Kya Karoon	Gagan	
2013	Warning	Anshul Pandey	
2014	Yaaran Da Katchup	Fateh King	Punjabi debut
2015	Angrej	Young Man	Punjabi debut
2015	Dolly Ki Doli	Manjot Chaddha	
2015	Kis Kisko Pyaar Karoon	Karan	
2015	Dilwale	Sidharth “Sidhu” Saigal	
2017	Raabta	Radha	
2017	Fukrey Returns	Dilip "Choocha" Singh	
2018	FryDay	Rajiv Chabbra	
2019	Arjun Patiala	Onida Singh	
2019	Khandaani Shafakhana	Bhooshit Bedi	
2019	Chhichhore	Sexa (Gurmeet Singh Dhillon)	
2020	Jai Mummy Di	Young Sanjog Luthra	Cameo
2021	Roohi	Kattanni Qureshi	
2021	Chutzpah	Vikas Bhalla	Web series
2022	Phone Bhoot	"Choocha"	Cameo
2022	Cirkus	Joy 1/Joy 2	Dual role
2023	Dark Darling	Karan Vohra	Adult feature film
2023	Fukrey 3	Dilip "Choocha" Singh	
2024	Tera Kya Hoga Lovely	Ved	Cameo
2024	Wild Wild Punjab	Rajesh Khanna	Netflix film
2026	Rahu Ketu	Rahu	

== Awards and nominations ==
Year	Film	Award	Category	Result
2013	Fukrey	Screen Awards	Best Actor In A Comic Role (Male)	Nominated
2013	Fukrey	Star Guild Awards	Most Promising Debut (Male)	Won
2013	Fukrey	Star Guild Awards	Best Performance In A Comic Role	Won
2013	Fukrey	Zee Cine Awards	Best Actor In A Comic Role	Won
