= Ali Fazal =

Indian actor (born 1986)

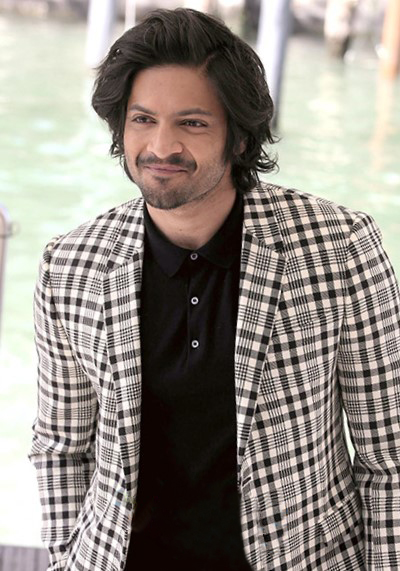
- Fazal in 2017
- Born: 15 October 1986 (age 39); Lucknow, India
- Education: St. Xavier's College
- Occupation: Actor
- Years active: 2008–present
- Works: Full list
- Spouse: Richa Chadha (m. 2020)
- Children: 1
- Relatives: Mohammed Fazal (grandfather)

Ali Fazal (born 15 October 1986) is an Indian actor who works primarily in Hindi films and television series. He made his screen debut with a small role in the film The Other End of the Line (2008) before appearing in the television miniseries Bollywood Hero (2009).

He had his first Hindi film release with a supporting role in 3 Idiots (2009), and went on to star in Always Kabhi Kabhi (2011), Baat Ban Gayi (2013), and Bobby Jasoos (2014). Greater success came for his roles in the comedies Fukrey (2013), Happy Bhag Jayegi (2016), Fukrey Returns (2017), as he expanded to international cinema with a small role in Furious 7 (2015) and a starring role as Abdul Karim in Victoria & Abdul (2017).

He has since starred as Guddu Pandit in the Amazon Prime Video crime thriller series Mirzapur (2018–present), and in the Hollywood films Death on the Nile (2022) and Kandahar (2023).

== Early life ==
Ali Fazal was born in Sir Gangaram Hospital, Delhi, and grew up in Lucknow, Uttar Pradesh. For a very brief period, he went to International Indian School, Dammam. He also went to La Martiniere College in Lucknow, Uttar Pradesh, and then moved to the all-boys boarding school, The Doon School in Dehradun, Uttarakhand. At Doon, he took up acting and participated in many Founder's Day theatre productions. He is said to have "found his calling" when he played the role of Trinculo, the jester in William Shakespeare's The Tempest. After Doon, Fazal went to Mumbai and graduated in economics from St. Xavier's College.

== Career ==
=== 2008–2012: Early work ===
Fazal appeared in a small role in the James Dodson-directed romantic comedy film The Other End of the Line (2008). The film was a critical and commercial failure. He next appeared in the American television miniseries Bollywood Hero (2009) where he portrayed the role of Monty Kapoor. During his second year of college, Saeed Akhtar Mirza saw him in a play and picked him for the lead of erotic thriller Ek Tho Chance (2009), alongside Amrita Arora and Saurabh Shukla. The film focused on the realities and comedies inherent in life in Mumbai. The film premiered at the 14th International Film Festival of Kerala.

The same year, Fazal made his Bollywood film debut with Rajkumar Hirani's National Film Award-winning 3 Idiots, a film loosely based on the novel Five Point Someone by Chetan Bhagat. He was doing a theatre play at Prithvi Theatre in Juhu, when a person from the film's production unit noticed him and referred him to Hirani. Co-starring alongside Aamir Khan, Kareena Kapoor, R. Madhavan, and Sharman Joshi, Fazal played the role of an engineering student, Joy Lobo, who takes his own life after being denied graduation due to him constantly stalling his project. The film received critical acclaim and emerged as the highest-grossing Bollywood film of all time up until then, grossing ₹3,920 million (US$41 million) worldwide.

In 2011, Fazal was picked up by Shah Rukh Khan's production house, Red Chillies Entertainment for the Roshan Abbas–directed romance film Always Kabhi Kabhi. Appearing opposite Giselli Monteiro, Fazal plays the role of Sameer Khanna and had to lose 15 kilos for the role. The film received negative response from the critics and was a box-office failure. While Komal Nahta of Koimoi said Fazal acted reasonably well, Gaurav Malani from The Times of India picked him as best in the cast. Later in an interview, Fazal said that doing the film was not a good decision.

=== 2013–present: Career progression ===
Fazal's first release in 2013 was in a coming-of-age comedy film Fukrey, in which he portrayed the role of Zafar, a struggling musician. The film along with his performance received mixed responses from critics. Nishi Tiwari from Rediff.com said he wore a "dazed expression" throughout the film, and Saibal Chatterjee from NDTV felt his role was "underwritten".

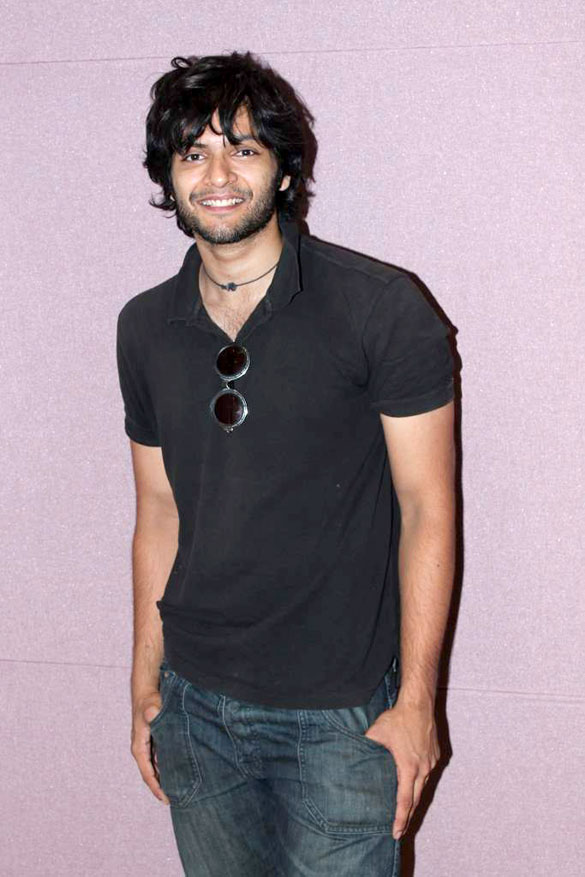
Fazal From The Javed Ali's song recording for film 'Bat Bann Gayi'

The same year, Fazal appeared in the romantic comedy film Baat Bann Gayi, which was considered a parody of Shakespeare's The Comedy of Errors. He portrayed the dual roles of Kabir, a successful novelist from Singapore, and Rasiya Bihari, a local don. The film met with negative reactions from critics and failed at the box office, though Fazal was praised for his acting. Faheem Ruhani from India Today considered him an upcoming talent to "watch out for", while The Times of India affirmed he is "standing out" from the cast.

In 2014, Fazal appeared in a supporting role opposite Vidya Balan in the comedy-drama Bobby Jasoos. Initially, Fazal refused the role since he felt he had "nothing much to do in it", but later agreed because of the "unusual romance" between him and Balan. Fazal's role as Tasawur, a popular local TV anchor who helps a Hyderabadi woman who aspires to be a detective (played by Balan), was well received. Taran Adarsh of Bollywood Hungama described Fazal as a "complete revelation": "Although pitted against a powerhouse performer like Vidya, Ali makes his presence felt with a wonderful performance".

The same year he appeared in the film Sonali Cable opposite Rhea Chakraborty, where he portrayed the role of Raghu. Fazal did his first on-screen intimate scene for a song in the film along with Chakraborty. His acting received mixed response from critics, where many criticised him for "recent stereotyped roles". Mohar Basu from Koimoi commented, "Ali Fazal is not even close to what he is capable of. The actor has good potential and this film fails to unleash it", though Renuka Vyavahare of The Times of India felt he was "likeable in his character". Both films received mixed to negative response from critics and were declared to be box office flops.

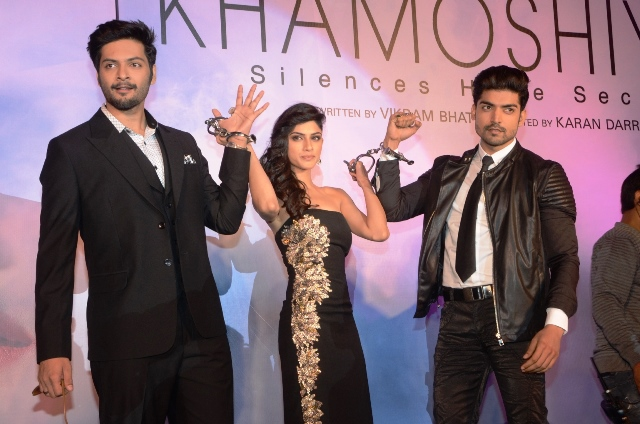
Fazal with Sapna Pabbi and Gurmeet Choudhary during Khamosiyan Promotions

Fazal next took the lead role in the psychological horror thriller Khamoshiyan (2015). He portrayed the role of Kabir, an alcoholic novelist, whose failed career and relationship forced him to move to Kashmir in search of an inspirational story. The film was a critical failure, though Fazal's performance was well received. Bollywood Hungama said: "He has a wide range of emotions that effortlessly inhabit his face". The Hindu critic Arjun Kumar described him as a "natural performer with effective screen presence".

Reportedly, Fazal was offered a role in the American political thriller television series Homeland, but he had to reject the offer since he had already commenced shooting for Khamoshiyan and ultimately the role went to Nimrat Kaur.

Fazal made his Hollywood film debut with a special appearance in the action film Furious 7, the seventh instalment in The Fast and the Furious film series. In the film review, The Hindu wrote: "Ali Fazal turns up in a fleeting cameo and before we could breathe in his presence he is ejected out of the scenery". Fazal said that he had only three scenes, but Subhash K. Jha from Bollywood Hungama considered those scenes "delightful".

Fazal was next seen in an Indo-American film, For Here Or To Go? which revolves around two Indian immigrants who find it difficult to build a successful life away from home. The film was played at many international film festivals. That same year, Fazal played the leading role in the Yash Raj Films youth studio Y-Films web series Bang Baaja Baaraat.

In 2016 Fazal played in Anand L. Rai's Happy Bhag Jayegi opposite Abhay Deol and Diana Penty. The film was a critical and commercial success. Fazal featured alongside Kalki Koechlin, in Soni Razdan's Love Affair, a fictionalised version of the 1959 Nanavati murder case. In addition, he has committed to star opposite Shriya Saran in Prakash Raj's romantic comedy Tadka.

In 2017, Fazal appeared in the sequel Fukrey Returns. He also starred in the British-American film Victoria & Abdul, which depicts the relationship of Queen Victoria (Judi Dench) and her confidant, Indian servant Abdul Karim. In 2018, he appeared in the spin-off Happy Phirr Bhag Jayegi and played Guddu Pandit in the web series Mirzapur. In 2019, he was cast in Milan Talkies, Prassthanam, and Netflix film House Arrest. In 2020 he continued his role of Guddu Pandit in Mirzapur season 2. He has also been cast in the film Death on the Nile as Andrew Katchadouriaan, a film based on Agatha Christie's novel of the same name.

In 2021 he turned producer. He started his own film production company named Pushing Buttons Studios with Richa Chadha.

In 2025, Fazal expanded to Tamil films with Mani Ratnam's Thug Life, playing a gangster. Several critics stated that he hardly had anything to do in the film. It underperformed at the box office.

In 2026, Fazal starred in the investigative crime thriller web series Raakh, which premiered on Amazon Prime Video on 12 June 2026. Set in 1970s Delhi and loosely inspired by the Ranga–Billa case, the series featured Fazal as Sub-Inspector Jayprakash alongside Sonali Bendre and Aamir Bashir.

== Personal life ==
Fazal is the grandson of Mohammed Fazal, a former prominent Indian National Congress politician. A practising Muslim, Fazal performed the Umrah pilgrimage in January 2022. He shared his journey to Mecca and Medina on Instagram.

Fazal had been in a relationship with Richa Chadha, though their marriage plans had to be postponed due to the COVID-19 pandemic. On 23 September 2022, he and Chadha announced their impending marriage and said that the ceremony would be eco-friendly. On 4 October 2022, they married in a ceremony in Lucknow. The couple welcomed their first child, a baby girl, on 16 July 2024. The couple announced that they have named their daughter Zuneyra Ida Fazal.

On 17 June 2020, Fazal's mother died due to health complications in Lucknow. Fazal's grandfather died on 24 April 2021.

== Other work and media image ==
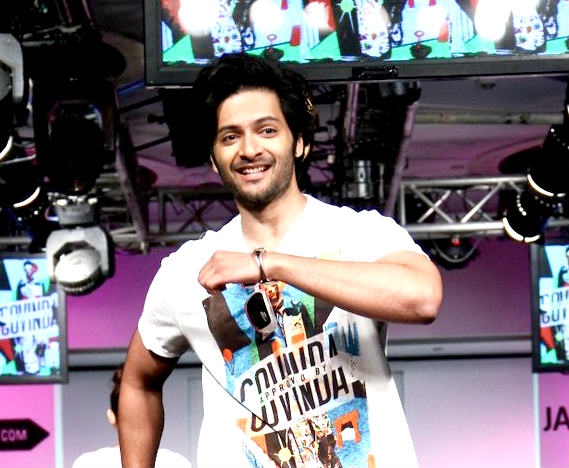
Fazal walking the ramp at Lakme Fashion Week, 2015

In February 2015, Fazal joined a Cancerthon organised by NDTV and Fortis to create awareness about cancer and raise funds for children battling the disease. He has though now left the work. Along with Tochi Raina, Fazal participated in a musical concert to raise funds for victims of the earthquake in Nepal.

Fazal is also an Advisor at Dhai Akshar Educational Trust, an NGO for underprivileged children in Mumbai.

In 2014, Fazal made an entry in The Times of India's listing of the "Most Desirable Man". In 2019 Power Brands honoured Fazal with "Power Brand: Industry Trendsetter" at BFJA (Bollywood Film Journalist's Awards).

== Filmography ==
Key
†	Denotes films that have not yet been released

=== Films ===
Year	Title	Role(s)	Language	Notes	Ref.
2008	The Other End of the Line	Vij	Hindi, English	Bilingual film	
2009	3 Idiots	Joy Lobo	Hindi	Cameo	
2009	Ek Tho Chance	Smridh	Hindi		
2011	Always Kabhi Kabhi	Sameer "Sam" Khanna	Hindi		
2013	Fukrey	Zafar Khan	Hindi		
2013	Baat Ban Gayi	Kabir / Rasiya Bihari	Hindi		
2014	Bobby Jasoos	Tasawur Sheikh	Hindi		
2014	Sonali Cable	Raghu	Hindi		
2014	Khoobsurat	Prince Charming	Hindi		
2015	Khamoshiyan	Kabir Malhotra	Hindi		
2015	For Here Or To Go?	Vivek Pandit	Hindi, English	Bilingual film	
2015	Furious 7	Safar	English		
2016	Xuanzang	Jayaram	Mandarin, Sanskrit		
2016	Happy Bhag Jayegi	Gurdeep "Guddu" Singh	Hindi		
2017	Fukrey Returns	Zafar Khan	Hindi		
2017	Victoria & Abdul	Abdul Karim	English		
2018	Happy Phirr Bhag Jayegi	Gurdeep "Guddu" Singh	Hindi		
2019	Milan Talkies	Annu	Hindi		
2019	Prassthanam	Ayushmann Singh	Hindi		
2019	House Arrest	Karan	Hindi		
2022	Death on the Nile	Andrew Katchadourian	English		
2022	Tadka	Siddharth	Hindi		
2023	Kandahar	Kahil	English		
2023	Fukrey 3	Zafar Khan	Hindi	Cameo appearance	
2023	Khufiya	Ravi Mohan	Hindi		
2025	Thug Life	Deepak Yadav	Tamil		
2025	Metro... In Dino	Akash	Hindi		
2026	Batwara 1947	Habib Anwar	Hindi		
2026	Mirzapur: The Movie	Guddu Pandit	Hindi		
2026	Lust Stories 3	Varun	Hindi		

=== Television ===
Year	Title	Role(s)	Platform	Notes	Ref(s)
2009	Bollywood Hero	Monty Kapoor	IFC	3 episodes	
2015	Bang Baaja Baaraat	Pawan Sharma	Y-Films	5 episodes	
2016	Sex Chat with Pappu & Papa	Himself	Y-Films	Episode: "Pregnancy"	
2018–present	Mirzapur	Govind 'Guddu' Pandit	Amazon Prime Video	29 episodes	
2019	Mind the Malhotras	Himself	Amazon Prime Video	Episode: "He Says, She Says"	
2020	Forbidden Love	Dev	ZEE5	Episode: "Arranged Marriage"	
2021	Ray	Ipsit Nair	Netflix	Episode: "Forget Me Not"	
2021	Call My Agent: Bollywood	Himself	Netflix	Episode 5	
2024	Solo Leveling	Song Chi-yul	Crunchyroll	Voice, Hindi dub	
2026	Raakh	Jayprakash Jatav	Amazon Prime Video		
TBA	Rakt Brahmand: The Bloody Kingdom †	TBA	Netflix	Filming	

=== Short films ===
Year	Title	Role(s)	Notes	Ref(s)
2010	Sleeping Awake	Unknown		
2012	According To Plan A	Abhi		
2015	Cheers	Himself		
2017	Triyacharitra	Ajay Rawat		
2020	Listen to Her	Husband		
2021	Prince Innerwear	Unknown		
2022	The Astronaut and His Parrot	TBA		

=== Music video appearances ===
Year	Title	Singer(d)	Ref.
2016	"Pyaar Manga Hai"	Armaan Malik, Neeti Mohan	
2020	"Aaj Bhi"	Vishal Mishra	

== Awards and nominations ==
Year	Award	Category	Work	Result	Ref.
2017	Hamptons International Film Festival	Variety 10 Actors to Watch	—N/a	Won	
2021	Indian Television Academy Awards	Best Actor – Web Series	Mirzapur	Nominated	
2021	Filmfare OTT Awards	Best Supporting Actor in a Drama Series	Mirzapur	Nominated	
2023	Bollywood Hungama OTT India Fest	Most-Loved Couple Of The Year (with Richa Chadda)	—N/a	Won	
2024	Filmfare OTT Awards	Best Supporting Actor in a Web Original	Khufiya	Nominated	
