= Richa Chadha =

Indian actress (born 1986)

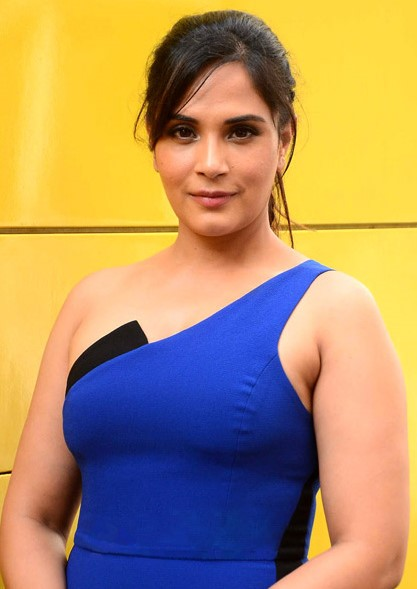
- Chadha in 2019
- Born: 18 December 1986 (age 39); Amritsar, Punjab, India
- Education: St. Stephen's College
- Occupation: Actress
- Years active: 2008–present
- Spouse: Ali Fazal (m. 2022)
- Children: 1

Richa Chadha (born 18 December 1986) is an Indian actress who works in Hindi cinema. She made her acting debut with a small role in the comedy film Oye Lucky! Lucky Oye! (2008). Chadha's breakthrough came in 2012 with the crime film Gangs of Wasseypur, in which her role as the foul-tongued wife of a gangster earned her the Filmfare Critics Award for Best Actress. In 2023, the Government of France awarded her with the Order of Arts and Letters.

Her career progressed with a supporting role in Goliyon Ki Raasleela Ram-Leela (2013) and a leading role in the drama film Masaan (2015). She had her biggest commercial success with the comedy film Fukrey (2013) and its sequels in 2017 and 2023, and has also starred in the film Section 375 (2019), and series Inside Edge (2017–2021) and Heeramandi (2024).

== Early life and education ==
Chadha was born in Amritsar, Punjab, to a Punjabi father and a Bihari mother. She was educated at Sardar Patel Vidyalaya, Delhi, and thereafter at St. Stephen's College, Delhi.

Chadha's father, Somesh Chadha, owns a management firm, and her mother, Kusum Lata Chadha, is a professor of political science at PGDAV College of Delhi University who has authored two books and also works with Gandhi Smriti.

== Career ==
=== Initial struggles (2008–2011) ===
Chadha began her career as a model and then she moved to theater. She has performed plays touring in India under Barry John.

Chadha made her acting debut in a supporting role as Dolly in Dibakar Banerjee-directed 2008 film Oye Lucky! Lucky Oye!. She appeared in the 2010 comedy film Benny and Babloo as Fedora. In the meanwhile, a Kannada movie in which she had acted, titled Nirdoshi was released in 2010 after a delay of almost three years.

=== Breakthrough and recognition (2012–2015) ===
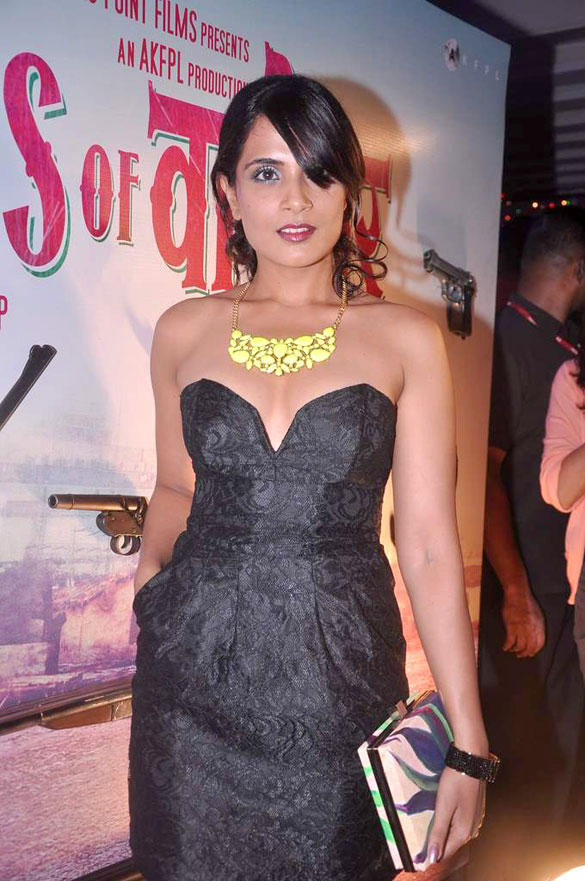
Chadda at event celebrating Gangs of Wasseypur

In 2012, she acted in Anurag Kashyap's crime drama Gangs of Wasseypur – Part 1. She stated in an interview that this role as Nagma Khatoon helped her get 11 film roles. The film premiered at the 65th Cannes Film Festival. She reprised her role as Nagma Khatoon in the sequel Gangs of Wasseypur – Part 2. The film premiered in the Cannes Directors' Fortnight at the Cannes Film Festival with its prequel. Chadha won the Filmfare Award for Best Actress (Critics), in addition to a Filmfare Award nomination in the Best Supporting Actress category.

Chadha's first release of 2013 came in the Mrighdeep Singh Lamba-directed coming-of-age comedy film Fukrey, in which she portrayed a tough-talking female don Bholi Punjaban. She then appeared in one of the segments in the Anurag Kashyap-produced anthology film Shorts titled "Epilogue". Chadha and Shirvastav play a dysfunctional couple who seem extremely unhappy with each other.

Chadha next appeared in a supporting role as Rasila in Sanjay Leela Bhansali-directed drama film Goliyon Ki Raasleela Ram-Leela, an adaptation of the Shakespearean tragedy of Romeo and Juliet. She received a nomination for the IIFA Award for Best Supporting Actress for her performance in the film. Chadha next appeared in Navneet Behal-directed 2014 film Tamanchey in the role of Babu, a criminal. It was screened out of competition at the 71st Venice International Film Festival. Her next movie was a biopic of Charles Sobhraj, Main Aur Charles.

=== Critical and commercial success (2016–present) ===
In January 2016, Chadha appeared as a journalist in the social-drama Chalk n Duster. She later appeared in Sarbjit, a biographical-drama film based upon the life of Sarabjit Singh. She portrayed the role of Sukhpreet, and shared screen alongside Aishwarya Rai and Randeep Hooda. Her performance in the film earned her a second nomination for the Filmfare Award for Best Supporting Actress.

In 2017, Richa acted in an Indian web-series Inside Edge, playing the lead character of a struggling actress. The series was positively received by both critics and audience. In the same year, Jia Aur Jia was released. The film received unfavorable reviews from critics and did not perform well at box office too. After that, she reprised her role as Bholi Punjaban in Fukrey Returns, a sequel to 2013 film Fukrey.

Richa Chadha worked in Sudhir Mishra's version of the Devdas saga, entitled Aur Devdas as Paro. Her much-delayed film with Pooja Bhatt, Cabaret, released on 9 January 2019. Chadha also worked for David Womark's Indo-American production Love Sonia. The film had its world premiere at the London Indian Film Festival on 21 June 2018. The film was released in India on 14 September 2018. Her two films, Section 375, a courtroom drama produced by Kumar Mangat Pathak, Abhishek Pathak and directed by Ajay Bahl, co-starring Akshaye Khanna was released on 13 September 2019. And her second film, Panga, directed by Ashwiny Iyer Tiwari with Kangana Ranaut as main lead, was released on 24 January 2020. The film earned her a third nomination for the Filmfare Award for Best Supporting Actress. She also starred in the web-film, Lahore Confidential, a ZEE5 spy thriller film, which included a cross-border love story for RAW Agent Ananya, played by Chadha. It released on 11 December 2020. Her next theatrical release, Shakeela released on 25 December 2020. In 2021, she started her own film production company named Pushing Buttons Studios with Ali Fazal.

In 2024, Chadha played a courtesan, Lajjo, in Sanjay Leela Bhansali's series Heeramandi. Shomini Sen of WION noted, "Richa Chadha in her limited screen time creates an impact with her tragic character." Shubhra Gupta stated that "she brings a 'thaska' to the proceedings, but is confined to a brief part". Her upcoming film includes Anubhav Sinha’s Abhi Toh Party Shuru Hui Hai.

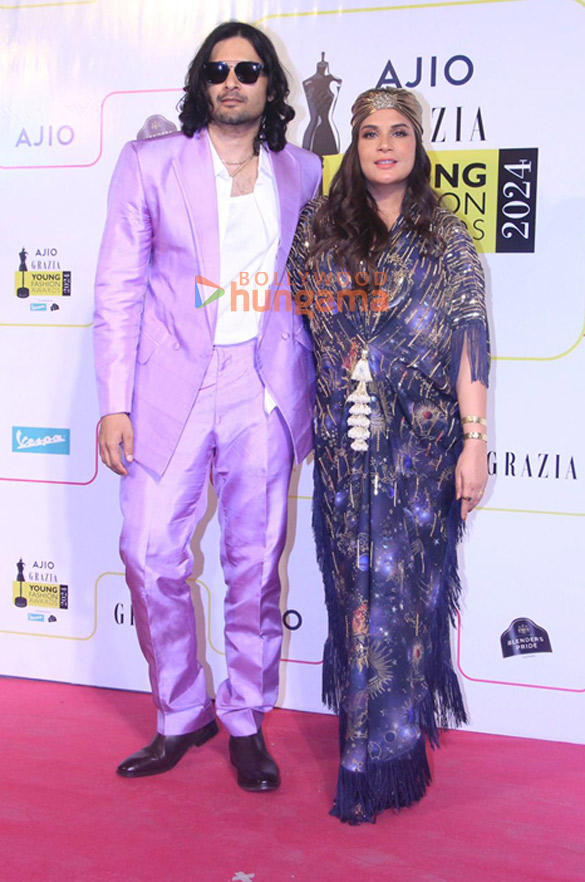
Richa Chadha with husband Ali Fazal at Grazia Young Fashion Awards 2024

== Personal life ==
In 2006, Chadha directed and wrote a 20-minute documentary film called "Rooted in Hope". In 2008, she participated in the "Gladrags Megamodel Contest." Chadha considers B. R. Ambedkar as her icon.

Chadha had been in a relationship with Ali Fazal. On 23 September 2022, she and Fazal announced their impending marriage and said that the ceremony would be eco-friendly. On 4 October 2022, she married Fazal at a ceremony in Lucknow. On 16 July 2024, Chadha and Fazal welcomed their first child, a baby girl.

== Off-screen work ==
=== Modeling and endorsements ===
In 2014, she posed as a mermaid for a People for the Ethical Treatment of Animals ad campaign, encouraging people to avoid eating fish and to go vegetarian. The same year, she walked the ramps of Lakme Fashion Week and performed in a play called Trivial Disasters.

=== Political activism ===
In January 2020, the actress had expressed solidarity with the students victimized in the JNU attack joining other actors from the film fraternity like Taapsee Pannu participating in a protest in Mumbai. Earlier, she opposed a police crackdown on Jamia Millia Islamia and Aligarh Muslim University students that took place on 15 December 2019 when students in these two campuses were protesting the India's Citizenship Amendment Act. Chadha created The Kindry, a social media effort, in June 2021, with the goal of amplifying ordinary good tales from society in the midst of the epidemic. The actor and her friend and entrepreneur Krishan Jagota have launched a dedicated Instagram page where they will spotlight people and their acts of goodwill.

=== Public views ===
Chadha argues that religion in India has deteriorated into hypocrisy, whether in the treatment of women or in the celebration of festivals. Chadha insists she is not "religious," but she has a deep connection with spirituality, and the more she studies it, the more baffled she is by society's treatment of women. Chadha filed a 'public interest' notice in May 2018 with an appeal to defend Hinduism from Hindutva sympathisers. She stated that Hinduism was under attack from Hindutva leaders. Chadha stated on Twitter, "Yes, Hinduism is in peril in India." However, Hindutva proponents pose a threat to Hinduism. Get rid of Hindutva sympathisers and the religion will be saved. In the public interest." After this, Chadha claimed to have receive rape & murder threats from rightwing Hindu trolls. Regarding her interreligious relationship with Ali Fazal, Chadha says that there are no objections from either side because his parents understand love. She believes that once you discover love, you should retain it without worrying about anything else, and she found her love in Ali. Chadha stated that her father is a Punjabi and her mother is a Bihari, and they share a great relationship that is unaffected by any form of bigotry. She was quoted saying, “Look, this is India. We are all very mixed. My mother is Bihari whereas my dad is Punjabi and here I am sitting in front of you."

In November 2022, Chadha apologised and deleted a controversial tweet, made in response to Lieutenant General Upendra Dwivedi's statement that "the Indian Army is ready to take back Azad Jammu and Kashmir if the Indian government issues the order", after receiving backlash from internet users in India which included her co-actors as well.

== Filmography ==
Key
†	Denotes films that have not yet been released

=== Films ===
Year	Title	Role	Notes
2008	Oye Lucky! Lucky Oye!	Dolly	
2010	Benny and Babloo	Fedora	
2012	Gangs of Wasseypur	Nagma Khatoon	
2012	Gangs of Wasseypur 2	Nagma Khatoon	
2013	Fukrey	Bholi Punjaban	
2013	Shorts	Girlfriend	
2013	Goliyon Ki Rasleela Ram-Leela	Rasila Sanera	
2014	Tamanchey	Babu	
2014	Words with Gods	Meghna	Indian-Mexican-American film
2015	Masaan	Devi Pathak	Indian-French film
2015	Main Aur Charles	Mira Sharma	
2016	Chalk n Duster	Bhairavi Thakkar	Cameo appearance
2016	Sarbjit	Sukhpreet Kaur	
2017	Jia Aur Jia	Jia	
2017	Fukrey Returns	Bholi Punjaban	
2018	3 Storeys	Leela	
2018	Daas Dev	Paro	
2018	Love Sonia	Madhuri	
2018	Ishqeria	Kuku	
2019	Cabaret	Rose/Razia/Rajjo	
2019	Section 375:Marzi Ya Jabardasti	Public prosecutor Hiral Gandhi	
2020	Panga	Meenu	
2020	Shakeela	Shakeela	
2020	Ghoomketu	Pagaliya	
2021	Madam Chief Minister	Tara Roopram	
2021	Lahore Confidential	Ananya Srivastav	
2023	Fukrey 3	Bholi Punjaban	
2024	Girls Will Be Girls	—N/a	Producer
TBD	Abhi Toh Party Shuru Hui Hai †	Sanjana Krishna	Filming

=== Podcast ===
Year	Title	Role	Co-star	Medium	Notes
2021	Virus 2062	Dr. Gaytri	Ali Fazal	Spotify	

=== Television ===
Year	Title	Role	Notes
2014	24	Sapna	Cameo appearance
2017–present	Inside Edge	Zarina Malik	
2019	One Mic Stand	Herself	Stand-up comedy
2020	55 km/sec	Srishti	Short film
2021	Candy	Ratna Sankhwar	
2022	The Great Indian Murder	DCP Sudha Bharadwaj	
2023	Charlie Chopra & The Mystery Of Solang Valley	Dolly Chopra	Cameo appearance
2024	Heeramandi	Lajwanti "Lajjo"	

== Accolades ==
Year	Film	Award	Category	Result	Ref
2013	Gangs of Wasseypur	Filmfare Awards	Best Actress (Critics)	Won	
2013	Gangs of Wasseypur	Filmfare Awards	Best Supporting Actress	Nominated	
2013	Gangs of Wasseypur	Screen Awards	Best Supporting Actress	Nominated	
2013	Gangs of Wasseypur	Stardust Awards	Best Supporting Actress	Nominated	
2013	Gangs of Wasseypur	Zee Cine Awards	Best Supporting Actress	Nominated	
2014	Fukrey	Screen Awards	Best Performance in a Comic Role	Won	
2014	Fukrey	Star Guild Awards	Best Actor in a Negative Role	Nominated	
2014	Goliyon Ki Raasleela Ram-Leela	Star Guild Awards	Best Actress in a Supporting Role	Nominated	
2014	Goliyon Ki Raasleela Ram-Leela	International Indian Film Academy Awards	Best Supporting Actress	Nominated	
2014	Goliyon Ki Raasleela Ram-Leela	Screen Awards	Best Supporting Actress	Nominated	
2015	Masaan	Stardust Awards	Editor's Choice Performer of the Year	Won	
2016	Sarbjit	Filmfare Awards	Best Supporting Actress	Nominated	
2019	Section 375	Screen Awards	Best Actress (Critics)	Nominated	
2020	Panga	Filmfare Awards	Best Supporting Actress	Nominated	
2023	Bollywood Hungama OTT India Fest	Most-Loved Couple Of The Year (with Ali Fazal)	—N/a	Won	

=== Other honours ===
- Richa Chadha was honoured with "Bharat Ratna Dr. Ambedkar Award 2020" for her significant contribution to Indian cinema. She received the honour at Raj Bhavan from the Governor of Maharashtra, Bhagat Singh Koshyari.
- In 2023, the Government of France awarded her with the Order of Arts and Letters.
- Richa Chadha was awarded the Woman of Substance at the I Am Woman awards by Karan Gupta in September 2024. While accepting the award, Chadha remarked that women's rights are human rights.
