= Priya Anand =

Indian actress (born 1986)

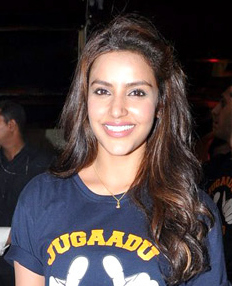
- Priya at Fukrey Jugaadu event
- Born: 17 September 1986 (age 39); Madras, Tamil Nadu, India
- Occupations: Actress; model
- Years active: 2009–present

Priya Anand (born 17 September 1986) is an Indian actress and model who predominantly appears in Tamil films. She has also appeared in a few Telugu, Hindi, Kannada and Malayalam films.

After pursuing higher studies in the US, she began a career in modelling in 2008 before making her acting debut in the Tamil film Vaamanan (2009) and then her Telugu debut in Leader a year later. She made her Hindi debut in 2012 with a supporting role in English Vinglish and subsequently appeared in the films Fukrey (2013) and Rangrezz (2013).

== Early life and education ==
Priya Anand was born on 17 September 1986 in Chennai, Tamil Nadu. She is the only child to a Tamil mother and a half-Telugu, half-Marathi father. She was brought up in both her parents' hometowns, Chennai and Hyderabad, becoming fluent in Tamil and Telugu. Besides native languages, Priya is proficient in English, Bengali, Hindi, Marathi and Spanish as well.

Priya became fascinated with films, developing an interest in cinema, since childhood, and noted that she has been dreaming of getting into the film industry and working on technical aspects of film making, but confesses she never thought of becoming an actor. She moved to the US, where she pursued her higher studies. Keeping her later career in mind, she studied communications and journalism at SUNY Albany. In 2008, she returned to India and ventured into modeling, appearing in various television advertisements like Nutrine Maha Lacto, Prince Jewellery and Cadbury Dairy Milk.

== Career ==
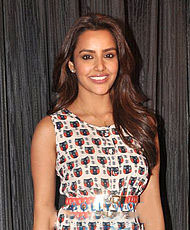
Priya at Kootathil Oruthan movie screening

=== 2009–2011: Early work in Tamil and Telugu cinema ===
Priya was initially supposed to make her acting debut in the Tamil film Pugaippadam, which she signed up first, but since its release was delayed until 2010, her first release became the action-thriller Vaamanan, directed by newcomer Ahmed. She was signed for the project in late 2008 to portray Divya, a simple girl next-door, whom the male lead character, played by Jai, would fall in love with. The film created some anticipation before its release, mainly due to its hit music by Yuvan Shankar Raja, which enabled a big opening, with the song "Aedho Seigirai" picturised on her considered as her "claim-to-fame" that made her popular among Tamil audience, and dubbed as a "Priya song". However the film got a lukewarm reception and did mediocrely at the Chennai box office.

In 2010, three of her films released within a short span of time, the first on New Year 2010, which was the college-life based drama Pugaippadam, a film revolving around the friendship between seven students. Priya enacted the character of one of the student roles, a Malayali Christian named Shiney George. The film opened to mixed reviews and proved to be commercially unsuccessful. She next starred in her first Telugu film, AVM Productions' Sekhar Kammula directed political drama Leader, alongside newcomers Rana Daggubati and Richa Gangopadhyay. She recalls that an assistant director of Kammula had found her on Facebook and invited her and how she had to audition thrice for the film to prove herself and eventually got the offer. She played Ratna Prabha, a television channel reporter and friend to a young man, who would later go on to become a political leader. Although her screen presence in the film was very limited, her performance garnered overwhelming response and was well received, while the film itself earned positive reviews and became a critical success. The Dil Raju-produced family entertainer Rama Rama Krishna Krishna was her last 2010 release, in which she plays the love interest of the film's male protagonist. She next starred in 180, a bilingual Tamil-Telugu project by ad filmmaker Jayendra, which was her only release in 2011.

=== 2012–2015: Debut in Hindi and breakthrough in Tamil cinema ===
She has made her debut Hindi film English Vinglish (2012), produced by R Balki, in which she had shared screen with Sridevi, who Priya admires and considers her idol. Priya said: "I signed this film just to be up and close to an artist who has influenced me and to be part of something that was so important to her. I'm doing this movie as her fan and I'm fortunate enough to play a very important part in her journey in the film". She acted in Telugu romance movie, Ko Antey Koti (2012). Her Hindi films in 2013 were Rangrezz and Fukrey. In Tamil, she played the lead role in Ethir Neechal (2013) alongside Sivakarthikeyan and Nandita Swetha. The film is a box-office winner. She was also seen in the comedy Vanakkam Chennai (2013).

She acted simultaneously for four Tamil films; Arima Nambi (2014) features Vikram Prabhu, Irumbu Kuthirai (2014) stars Atharvaa, with Vimal in Oru Oorla Rendu Raja (2014) and Vai Raja Vai (2015) features her opposite Gautham Karthik. Priya Anand has shot for a special cameo in G. V. Prakash Kumar’s Trisha Illana Nayanthara (2015) which is being directed by newcomer Adhik Ravichandran.

=== 2017–present ===
Priya Anand debuted in Malayalam with the Prithviraj starrer horror thriller Ezra (2017). The next was a Tamil movie, Muthuramalingam (2017). However this movie was a failure. Priya Anand made her Kannada debut with the much-hyped Raajakumara (2017) and added a new dimension to her career. Her next projects were followed by comedies in Tamil with Kootathil Oruthan (2017) and Hindi with Fukrey Returns (2017). Priya Anand's long time desire to work in a period film highly anticipated Malayalam release Kayamkulam Kochunni (2018), which stars Nivin Pauly. Priya's character played a pivotal role in the life of Kochunni. Priya, who won over the Kannada cinema audience right in her first film, has worked with Ganesh in Orange (2018). She appeared in the Malayalam Kodathi Samaksham Balan Vakeel (2019) starring Dileep. She then played in the political satire Tamil film LKG (2019). She was seen in Dhruv Vikram’s debut, Adithya Varma (2019), in a supporting role. Priya Anand to reunite opposite Puneeth Rajkumar again in James (2022). After being postponed multiple times, director R. Kannan’s Kasethan Kadavulada (2023) was released, with the remake of the 1972 film of the same name. She also joined the cast of Leo (2023) directed by Lokesh Kanagaraj. Her next movie in the Kannada was Yogaraj Bhat’s Karataka Damanaka (2024). She has worked with stars like Prashanth and Simran in Andhagan (2024).

== Social work ==
On 20 June 2011, Priya became an ambassador for the Save the Children campaign for both Tamil Nadu and Andhra Pradesh.

== Filmography ==
=== Film ===
List of Priya Anand film credits
Year	Title	Role	Language	Notes
2009	Vaamanan	Divya	Tamil	
2010	Pugaippadam	Shiney George	Tamil	
2010	Leader	Ratna Prabha	Telugu	
2010	Rama Rama Krishna Krishna	Priya	Telugu	
2011	180	Renuka Narayanan	Telugu	Bilingual film
2011	Nootrenbadhu	Renuka Narayanan	Tamil	Bilingual film
2012	English Vinglish	Radha Desai	Hindi	Nominated, Zee Cine Award for Best Actress in a Supporting Role
2012	English Vinglish	Radha Desai	Hindi	Nominated, Star Guild Award for Best Actress in a Supporting Role
2012	Ko Antey Koti	Sathya	Telugu	
2013	Rangrezz	Megha Joshi	Hindi	
2013	Fukrey	Priya Sharma	Hindi	
2013	Ethir Neechal	Geetha	Tamil	
2013	Vanakkam Chennai	Anjali Rajamohan	Tamil	
2014	Arima Nambi	Anaamika Raghunath	Tamil	
2014	Irumbu Kuthirai	Samyuktha Ramakrishnan	Tamil	
2014	Oru Oorla Rendu Raja	Priya	Tamil	
2015	Vai Raja Vai	Priya	Tamil	
2015	Trisha Illana Nayanthara	Train passenger	Tamil	Cameo
2017	Ezra	Priya Raghuram	Malayalam	
2017	Muthuramalingam	Viji	Tamil	
2017	Raajakumara	Nandini	Kannada	
2017	Kootathil Oruthan	Janani	Tamil	
2017	Maya	Maya	Tamil	Short film
2017	Fukrey Returns	Priya Sharma	Hindi	
2018	Kayamkulam Kochunni	Janaki	Malayalam	
2018	Orange	Radha	Kannada	
2019	Kodathi Samaksham Balan Vakeel	Teena Shankar	Malayalam	
2019	LKG	Sarala Munusamy (Sara M. Samy)	Tamil	
2019	Adithya Varma	Priya Menen	Tamil	
2022	James	Nisha Gayakwad	Kannada	
2023	Kasethan Kadavulada	Shakthi	Tamil	
2023	Leo	Priya Joshy Andrews	Tamil	
2024	Karataka Damanaka	Kusuma	Kannada	
2024	Andhagan	Julie	Tamil	Nominated, Filmfare Award for Best Supporting Actress – Tamil
2025	Sumo	Kani	Tamil	
2025	Controll	Kashish	Hindi	
2026	Balaramana Dinagalu	Revathi Deviah	Kannada	

=== Television ===
List of Priya Anand television credits
Year	Title	Role	Language	Network	Ref.
2020	A Simple Murder	Richa	Hindi	SonyLIV	
2022	Maa Neella Tank	Surekha	Telugu	ZEE5	
2024	The Mystery of Moksha Island	Jhansi	Telugu	Disney+Hotstar	

=== Music videos ===
Year	Song	Language	Notes	Singers	Music	Ref.
2021	"Dream Mein Entry"	Hindi	Saregama Originals	Jyotica Tangri, Parry G	Gourov Dasgupta	
