= Mirzapur (disambiguation) =

Mirzapur is a city in Uttar Pradesh, India.

Mirzapur may also refer to:

== Places ==
=== Bangladesh ===
- Mirzapur Upazila, a upazila of Tangail District
- Mirzapur, Bangladesh, a town in Mirzapur Upazila, Tangail District
- Mirzapur Union (disambiguation), several union councils

=== India ===
- Mirzapur district, a district of Uttar Pradesh
- Mirzapur division, a division of Uttar Pradesh
- Mirzapur railway station, Uttar Pradesh
- Mirzapur (Lok Sabha constituency), Uttar Pradesh
- Mirzapur (Assembly constituency), Uttar Pradesh
- Mirzapur, Bardhaman, a census town in Bardhaman district, West Bengal
- Mirzapur-Bankipur railway station, in Hooghly district, West Bengal
- Mirzapur, Kamrup Metropolitan district, village in Kamrup Metropolitan district, Assam
- Mirzapur, Murshidabad, a census town in West Bengal
- Mirzapur, Raebareli, a village in Raebareli district, Uttar Pradesh

=== Nepal ===
- Mirjapur, Sarlahi, a village in Sarlahi district

== Other ==
- Mirzapur (TV series), an Amazon Prime Video web series
  - Mirzapur (TV soundtrack), the soundtrack for the TV series
  - Mirzapur (film), a 2026 Indian film by Gurmeet Singh
    - Mirzapur (film soundtrack), the soundtrack for the film

== See also ==
- Mirjapur (disambiguation)
