= Mirzapur (TV soundtrack) =

2021 soundtrack album by John Stewart Edduri and Anand Bhaskar

Mirzapur (Amazon Original Series Soundtrack)

Soundtrack album by Anand Bhaskar and John Stewart Eduri
- Released: 21 October 2020
- Recorded: 2019–2020
- Genre: Amazon Original Series Soundtrack
- Length: 42:35
- Language: Hindi
- Label: Zee Music Company
- Producers: Parth Parekh; Anand Bhaskar; Ajay Jayanthi

Mirzapur is the soundtrack for the Amazon Prime Original web television series of the same name, created by Karan Anshuman. The series directed by Anshuman, Gurmmeet Singh and Mihir Desai features Pankaj Tripathi, Shweta Tripathi, Divyendu Sharma, Ali Fazal, Vikrant Massey, Shriya Pilgaonkar, Rasika Dugal, Harshita Gaur and Kulbhushan Kharbanda in the first season, whereas the second season has Vijay Varma, Isha Talwar, Lilliput, Anjum Sharma, Priyanshu Painyuli, Anangsha Biswas and Neha Sargam in prominent roles.

The series features 12 songs composed by Anand Bhaskar and John Stewart Eduri, who also composed the background score. It features few songs from the first and second season respectively. It was released on 21 October 2020 by Zee Music Company label.

== Development ==
Before composing for Mirzapur, Bhaskar worked in an advertising agency, later quitting his job to pursue his career as a full-time musician. On bagging the project, he stated in an online news portal that he got a random call from Abbas Khan, the show's head producer, who referred him to Excel's in-house music producer Ankur Tewari. The creative team wanted Bhaskar to pen a few songs so that Tiwari could have something to work on .

The album had twelve songs compiled for both season one and two. It took him about a year to create all the songs in Mirzapur, however the time for the composition of the songs individually took a few months. He initially planned to release all the songs in March 2020, but due to the COVID-19 pandemic lockdown, it took him more time for composition.

== Composition ==
For the songs "Tittar Bittar", Bhaskar roped in his entire band Anand Bhaskar Collective, along with indie musician Isheeta Chakravarty to render vocals for this number. Ginny Diwan, the lyricist of this song penned the lyrics within an hour. Anand stated that "It's an 'item song' from a woman's point of view while a fight is on. I'm grateful the directors supported our wacky ideas". Later he also roped in Shipla Surroch and Keka Ghoshal, who were also independent singers to record the album. Anand Bhaskar planned to compose a wedding song for Guddu (Ali Fazal) and Sweety (Shriya Pilagonkar) which is touted to be a Sufi number. An original song titled "Varoon" was created for the same.

Bhasker stated that "Munna Rap" was not initially planned to happen in 2015. He opined that the makers of Mirzapur (Mihir Desai and Gurmmeet Singh) were focusing more on situational songs. He also had a Sufi song ("Varoon"), a Bhojpuri song ("Sajanwa Ki Gunwa") and a Punjabi wedding song ("Saure Chali Ve"). "Munna Rap" was difficult to compose, according to Bhaskar, since he had to mix influences from Uttar Pradesh folk as the modern hip-hop to achieve the right sound. With "Munna Rap" became an exceptional hit upon release Bhaskar stated that the song managed to give a chance to compose in genres that were out of his comfort zone. Being the last song that Bhaskar had composed for the series, the song also had a female version performed by Shilpa Surroch.

Once I got on board, the makers had come up with lyrics and I wanted to compose a song using them, but I could not. Then one day, I was exploring some tunes on sarangi on my laptop and managed to come up with a sounding hook for the song. I added some lines to the composition and sent it to Mihir. He loved it instantly and said it totally goes with the vibe of Munna Bhaiya. That's how the song came into being. While the demo lyrics didn't work, Ginny Diwan (lyricist) was brought on board for it.

— Anand Bhaskar about the creation of "Munna Rap"

== Track listing ==
The songs are composed by Anand Bhaskar while the background score is composed by John Stewart Eduri. Lyrics are written by Ginny Diwan.

Mirzapur (Original Series Soundtrack)
No.	Title	Singer(s)	Length
1.	"Mirzapur Theme Song"	John Stewart Eduri	1:28
2.	"Vaaroon"	Romy	5:50
3.	"Tittar Bittar"	Isheeta Chakrvarty, Anand Bhasker (Backing Vocals)	4:10
4.	"Sab Ho Jaane De"	Pratichee Mohapatra, Anand Bhasker (Backing Vocals)	4:09
5.	"Lallanwa"	Vijayaa Shanker	4:30
6.	"Munna Rap"	Anand Bhaskar	3:19
7.	"Ding Dong"	Keka Ghoshal, Suraj Paraswani (Dialogue)	3:04
8.	"Raakh"	Anand Bhaskar	5:51
9.	"Munna Rap (Female Version)"	Shilpa Surroch	3:18
10.	"Sajanwa Ki Gunwa"	Veena Parasher	2:08
11.	"Saure Chali Ve"	Rashmeet Kaur	2:03
12.	"Mirzapur Bhaukal Mix"	John Stewart Eduri	2:41
Total length:			42:35

=== Season 3 ===
Mirzapur 3 (Amazon Original Series Soundtrack)

Soundtrack album by Anand Bhaskar and John Stewart Eduri
- Released: 8 July 2024
- Recorded: 2023–2024
- Genre: Amazon Original Series Soundtrack
- Length: 39:02
- Language: Hindi
- Label: Zee Music Company

The songs are composed by Anand Bhaskar while the background score is composed by John Stewart Eduri. Lyrics are written by Ginny Diwan.

Mirzapur 3 (Original Motion Picture Soundtrack)
No.	Title	Singer(s)	Length
1.	"Duaa"	Ghansham Vaswani	4:42
2.	"Twinkal Twinkal"	Vivek Hariharan	1:54
3.	"Madhuri Anthem"	Vidhya Gopal	1:26
4.	"J 4 Zarina"	Keka Ghoshal	1:14
5.	"Kajri"	Vijayaa Shanker	1:20
6.	"Boys" (Instrumental)	–	1:49
7.	"Jhandu" (Instrumental)	–	2:06
8.	"Kaleen Bhaiya" (Instrumental)	–	1:05
9.	"Parivaar" (Instrumental)	–	1:28
10.	"Guddu Pandit" (Instrumental)	–	1:35
11.	"Mirzapur Pe Raaj" (Instrumental)	–	1:41
12.	"Munna Tripathi" (Instrumental)	–	2:32
13.	"Sharad Shukla" (Instrumental)	–	0:55
14.	"Babbar Sher" (Instrumental)	–	4:11
15.	"Ghayal Sher" (Instrumental)	–	2:30
16.	"Justice" (Instrumental)	–	2:20
17.	"Mirzapur Reprise" (Instrumental)	–	1:30
18.	"Mr. Purvanchal" (Instrumental)	–	3:09
19.	"The King" (Instrumental)	–	2:04
Total length:			39:02

== Personnel ==
Credits adapted from Zee Music Company

- John Stewart Eduri - Composer (Track 1,12)
- Anand Bhasker - Composer (Tracks 2–11), backing vocalist (Track 3,4), playback singer (Track 6,8), Music Producer (Track 6,8), audio mixing (Track 6), mastering (Track 6)
- Ginny Diwan - Lyricist (Tracks 2–11)
- Romy - Playback singer (Track 2)
- Isheeta Chakravarty - Playback singer (Track 3)
- Pratichee Mohapatra - Playback singer (Track 4)
- Vijayaa Shanker - Playback singer (Track 5)
- Keka Ghoshal - Playback singer (Track 7)
- Shilpa Surroch - Playback singer (Track 9)
- Veena Parasher - Playback singer (Track 10)
- Rashmeet Kaur - Playback singer (Track 11)
- Suraj Paraswani - Dialogues (Track 7)
- Nidhi Sethia - Backing vocalist (Track 4)
- Seepi Gupta - Backing vocalist (Track 4)
- Hrishi Giridhar - Guitar (Track 2,5,8), Mandolin (Track 2)
- Neelkanth Patel - Bass (Track 2,8)
- Omkar Agnihotri - Harmonium (Track 3,5)
- Kahaan Shah - Tabla (Track 3), Percussion (Track 3)
- Vinay Sharma - Keys (Track 12)
- Ajay Jayanthi - Music producer (Track 4,6,8,9), recording engineer (Track 6,8), audio mixing (Track 4,6,8,9), mastering (Track 4,6,8,9), strings (Track 2), violin (Track 2,8), musical arrangement (Track 9)
- Parth Parekh - Music producer (Track 2,3,4,5,7,10,11), recording engineer (Track 2,3,5,10,11), audio mixing (Track 3,5,7,10,11), mastering (Track 3,5,7,10,11)
- Nawab Khan - Music producer (Track 12)
- Zoheb Khan - Music producer (Track 12), mixing (Track 12), mastering (Track 12)
- Prathamesh Dudhane - Audio mixing (Track 2), mastering (Track 2)
- Jeremy Fonseca - Recording engineer (Track 4,7)

== See also ==
- Mirzapur (film soundtrack), soundtrack to the 2026 film
