= Mirjapur =

Mirjapur may refer to:

- Mirjapur, Janakpur, Nepal
- Mirjapur, Narayani, Nepal

== See also ==
- Mirzapur (disambiguation)
