= Shaji Choudhary =

Indian actor

- Born: Tonk Rajasthan, India
- Occupation: Actor
- Years active: 2004-present
- Children: 2

Shaji Choudhary (born 7 July 1982) is an Indian actor who plays supporting roles in Indian films and TV serials. Shaji is known for his roles in Pathaan, Main Hoon Na, Jodhaa Akbar, Shaurya Aur Suhani, PK and Mirzapur.

== Early life and family background ==
Shaji was born in the village Dodwari in Tonk, Rajasthan. His father Roopnarayan Choudhary and his mother Rampyari Choudhary were both farmers.

== Career ==
Shaji moved to Mumbai, where he started his acting career with an appearance in the second season of the TV serial Shaktimaan on DD1 as the villain Kilvish (The role of Kilvish was portrayed by Surendra Pal in Season One). He made his first film appearance in Main Hoon Na. In 2008, he worked alongside Hrithik Roshan and Aishwarya Rai Bachchan when director Ashutosh Gowariker signed him to play the character of Akbar's general Adham Khan in the historical drama film Jodhaa Akbar. Later, Shaji featured as Aghor in Shaurya Aur Suhani, a romantic soap opera in which he essayed a minor role. In 2014, he played Tapasvi Maharaj's bodyguard in the film PK. Shaji played the role of Maqbool Khan in the TV Series Mirzapur where he played the role of Kaleen Bhaiya's (Pankaj Tripathi) trusted henchman. He was also seen in C.I.D episodes portraying several characters.

In 2023, he was seen in the action-thriller Pathaan.

== Filmography ==
Year	Title	Role	Notes	Ref
2004	Main Hoon Na	Johan		
2008	Jodhaa Akbar	Adham Khan		
2009	Shaurya Aur Suhani	Aghor	Television series	
2010	Lahore	Iqbal Khan		
2012	Shudra: The Rising	Thakur		
2012	Chundri Odhasi Mahro Bir	Thakur		
2013	Shootout at Wadala	Aurangzeb		
2013	Singh Saab the Great	Trilok		
2014	PK	Tapasvi Maharaj Bodyguard		
2015	Tevar	Sultan		
2016	Wagah	Razzak Ali Khan		
2016	Mohenjo Daro	Kulka		
2017	Kaabil	Anna		
2018	Thugs of Hindostan	Bhure Lal		
2018	Mirzapur	Maqbool	Web Series	
2019	Blank	Terrorist		
2019	Pranaam	Thakur Bhanu Pratap		
2023	Pathaan	Raza		
2024	Chhota Bheem and the Curse of Damyaan	Churan Singh		
2025	Jewel Thief	Salim Misti		
2025	Romeo S3	Yusuf		
2025	Do You Wanna Partner	Premnath Kakinath Tokas aka Tokas Pehelwan	Web Series	
2026	Mirzapur	Maqbool Khan	Film	

== Awards ==
- Best Supporting Actor - Jharkhand National Film Festival
