= Anjum Sharma =

Indian Actor

- Born: Anjumm Shharma; Mumbai, Maharashtra, India
- Occupation: Actor
- Years active: 2008–present
- Known for: Mirzapur
- Spouse: Nilima Sharma

Anjum Sharma, also known as Anjumm Shharma, is an Indian actor. He is best known for his role as Sharad Shukla in Mirzapur.

== Early life ==
Anjum Sharma was born in Mumbai. He married Nilima Sharma.

== Career ==
Anjum Sharma started his career in 2008 with Slumdog Millionaire. After 12 years of struggle, he was recognized for the role of Sharad Shukla in Mirzapur.

== Filmography ==
Year	Title	Role	Notes	Ref.
2008	Slumdog Millionaire	Operator	British film	
2008	Once Upon a Time in Mumbaai	Soheb friend	British film	
2016	Wazir	Sartaj	Hindi film	
2018–2024	Mirzapur	Sharad Shukla	TV series	
2019	Made in Heaven	Vishal Singh	TV series	
2023	Sultan of Delhi	Nilendu Bangopodhya	TV series	
2026	Kaptaan	Munna	TV series	
2026	Mirzapur	Sharad Shukla	Film	
