= Glory (TV series) =

Indian streaming television series

- Genre: Sports; Thriller; Action
- Created by: Karmanya Ahuja; Karan Anshuman
- Written by: Karmanya Ahuja; Karan Anshuman; Vaibhav Vishal
- Directed by: Karan Anshuman; Kanishk Varma
- Starring: Divyenndu; Pulkit Samrat; Kashmira Pardeshi; Suvinder Vicky; Ashutosh Rana; Sayani Gupta; Sikandar Kher; Nikita Chandak
- Music by: John Stewart
- Opening theme: Glory Title Track (season 1)
- Country of origin: India
- Original language: Hindi
- No. of seasons: 1
- No. of episodes: 7

Production
- Producers: Arif Mir; Nishant Pandey
- Cinematography: John Schmidt
- Running time: 47–60 minutes
- Production company: Atomic Films

Original release
- Network: Netflix
- Release: 1 May 2026

Glory is a 2026 Indian Hindi-language sports thriller television series written and directed by Karan Anshuman and Kanishk Varma for Netflix. The series is produced by Karan Anshuman and Mohit Shah of Atomic Films. It stars Divyenndu, Pulkit Samrat and Suvinder Vicky as pivotal role.

The series was filmed mostly across Haryana. John Schmidt served as the cinematographer of the series. John Stewart Eduri composed the background score.

The first season of Glory was released on 1 May 2026.

== Premise ==
In a small-town boxing hub, two brothers investigate a shocking murder while navigating a troubled reunion with their father, a renowned coach.

== Cast ==
- Divyenndu as Devinder "Dev" Singh
- Pulkit Samrat as Ravinder "Ravi" Singh
- Suvinder Vicky as Raghubir Singh alias "Coach Sir", Head Coach and owner of Haryana Boxing Club; Dev, Ravi, and Gudiya's father
- Jannat Zubair Rahmani as Gudiya Singh, Dev and Ravi's younger sister
- Kashmira Pardeshi as Bharti, Arvind's wife and Ravi's lover
- Ashutosh Rana as Viju Sangwan, Head Coach and owner of Shakti Boxing Academy; Raghubir's rival
- Sayani Gupta as Joyna Hazarika, Dev's love interest
- Yashpal Sharma as Sarpanch
- Sikandar Kher as Kookie Yadav
- Zakir Hussain as DSP Phogat
- Vishal Vashishtha as Inspector Arvind Shekhawat, Ravi's friend and Bharti's husband
- Renji Panicker as Coach Panicker, Head Coach at NSI
- Tanisha Sharma as Sonika
- Kunal Thakur as Raka Singh Beniwal, Raghubir and Viju's student; Ravi's rival boxer
- Vladimir Angelove as Alexei Rustinov, Assistant Coach at NSI
- Yugam Sood as Nihal Singh, Olympic aspirant and Gudiya's boyfriend
- Nikita Chandak (Miss Nepal) as Surveen

== Episodes ==
No.	Title	Directed by	Written by	Original release date
1	"K.O."	Karan Anshuman, Kanishk Varma	Karmanya Ahuja, Karan Anshuman, and Vaibhav Vishal	1 May 2026
Dev and Ravi return to Shaktigarh after years away, pulled back by the brutal assault on their sister Gudiya. The Catalyst lands hard in the family home as they confront their father Raghubir, whose rigid boxing obsession has hollowed their past relationship. Tension tightens as the brothers begin tracing the attackers through the local boxing circuit. As Collision approaches, old grief over Nihal Singh's mysterious death resurfaces, turning suspicion inward across the town. A Moral Pivot forces Dev and Ravi to lean into rage and instinct, risking their remaining family bonds as the search grows more dangerous.
2	"Counterpunch"	Karan Anshuman, Kanishk Varma	Karmanya Ahuja, Karan Anshuman, and Vaibhav Vishal	1 May 2026
3	"Sparring Partner"	Karan Anshuman, Kanishk Varma	Karmanya Ahuja, Karan Anshuman, and Vaibhav Vishal	1 May 2026
4	"Rope-a-Dope"	Karan Anshuman, Kanishk Varma	Karmanya Ahuja, Karan Anshuman, and Vaibhav Vishal	1 May 2026
5	"Low Blow"	Karan Anshuman, Kanishk Varma	Karmanya Ahuja, Karan Anshuman, and Vaibhav Vishal	1 May 2026
6	"Underdog"	Karan Anshuman, Kanishk Varma	Karmanya Ahuja, Karan Anshuman, and Vaibhav Vishal	1 May 2026
7	"Suckerpunch"	Karan Anshuman, Kanishk Varma	Karmanya Ahuja, Karan Anshuman, and Vaibhav Vishal	1 May 2026

== Soundtrack ==
Glory

Soundtrack album by John Stewart
- Released: 27 April 2026
- Length: 15:28
- Languages: Hindi, Haryanvi
- Label: T-Series

Official audio
- Glory Jukebox on YouTube

The music composer John Stewart, who are frequent collaborators of Karan Anshuman, composed music for the series. He composed two songs, "Glory Title Track" and "Do Shera". Sez on the Beat composed two songs, "Aaya Jung Mein" and "Baat Baat Pe". A soundtrack album comprising six songs was released by T-Series on 27 April 2026.

No.	Title	Lyrics	Music	Singer(s)	Length
1.	"Glory Title Track"	Yashasvi Bhardwaj, Tushar Gill, Ram Gopal	John Stewart, RAIYAT	The Revolutions	2:31
2.	"Aaya Jung Mein"	KD DESIROCK	Sez on the Beat	KD DESIROCK	3:06
3.	"Laadli Roothe Na"	Sanjeev Pundir	Gauranga-Bixal	Arun Dev Yadav	3:34
4.	"Udd Gayi Kabootri"	Sanjeev Pundir	Gauranga-Bixal	Arnab Dutta	2:37
5.	"Baat Baat Pe"	Sanjeev Pundir	Sez on the Beat	Amjad Bagadwa, Parshant Khairwal	2:12
6.	"Do Shera"	Parry Gripp	John Stewart	Parry Gripp	1:28

== Release ==
Glory started to premier at Netflix from 1 May 2026.

== Reception ==
Anuj Kumar for The Hindu stated the series "a cohesive whole for viewers attuned to logical consistency and tonal balance."

Shubhra Gupta of The Indian Express rated the series 2/5 stars and raised concern about violence shown stating "Animals aren’t spared either."

Joel Keller of Decider stated the series as "it’s a pretty dark and violent story." Bhavna Agarwal of India Today wrote "The idea is strong: use a whodunit to peel back emotional layers. And initially, it works."

Suchin Mehrotra of The Hollywood Reporter India stated "shamelessly pulpy crime drama in recent memory — emotionally potent, generically promiscuous, and rich with festering old wounds." Udita Jhunjhunwala for Scroll.in felt the violence is extreme." BH Harsh of Cinema Express praised Divyenndu's performance and wrote "Divyenndu delivers a stellar performance."

Abhimanyu Mathur Hindustan Times stated "Glory is a good example of ‘what could have been’, which has been the story of Indian OTT since the pandemic." Bollywood Hungama rated the series 3 stars in their review.

Shachi Chaturvedi from News18 stated "the narrative could have benefited from tighter storytelling."
