= Agra Affair =

Hindi romantic drama series

- Genre: Romantic drama
- Written by: Sankalp Raj Tripathi; Tatsat Pandey; Abhinav Vaidya
- Directed by: Mandar Kurundkar
- Starring: Aakash Dahiya; Harshita Gaur
- Country of origin: India
- Original language: Hindi

Original release
- Network: MX Player
- Release: 8 January 2025

Agra Affair is a 2025 Indian Hindi-language romantic drama series directed by Mandar Kurundkar and written by Sankalp Raj Tripathi, Tatsat Pandey, and Abhinav Vaidya. The series stars Aakash Dahiya as Aakash, a cook who dreams of opening his restaurant, and actress Harshita Gaur as Tanvi, a tour guide navigating a career in a predominantly male field.

== Plot summary ==
Aakash manages his family's declining establishment, Hotel Aalishan, while nurturing dreams of establishing a restaurant catering to international tourists. Tanvi, a determined tour guide, partners with Aakash to revitalize the hotel. As their professional relationship deepens, Aakash develops unrequited feelings for Tanvi. The story further complicates when Aakash finds solace in Megha (Chakori Dwivedi), prompting Tanvi to confront her own emotions, leading to a nuanced exploration of love and timing.

== Cast and characters ==
- Aakash Dahiya as Aakash
- Harshita Gaur as Tanvi
- Chakori Dwivedi as Megha
- Pratik Pachauri as Kookie
- Aman Gupta as Rakesh Aggarwal
- Shravan Kumar as Bantu
- Siddhant Raj Tripathi as Rishi
- Aparna Upadhyay as Chandni Sachdeva
- Diwakar Dhyani as Alok Sachdeva
- Neetu Jhanjhi as Anurupa Aggarwal

== Critical reception ==
Archika Khurana of The Times of India rated the series 3 out of 5 stars, noting its "heartfelt performances, vibrant setting, and emotional storytelling." She mentioned that while the plot is familiar, its execution is genuine and engaging. Farhad Dalal of Popcorn Reviews commented "The first season of Agra Affair showcases the bittersweet chronicles of love while boasting of solid performances that make for a light and breezy watch."

== Release ==
The series premiered on Amazon MX Player in January 2025. The official trailer was released on YouTube.
