= Kaptaan (TV Series) =

- Genre: Crime, Drama, Thriller
- Written by: Harman Baweja; Jay Sheela Bansal; Jatin Satish Wagle
- Directed by: Jatin Satish Wagle
- Starring: Saqib Saleem; Anushka Kaushik; Siddharth Nigam; Kavita Kaushik; Arif Zakaria; Varun Badola
- Country of origin: India
- Original language: Hindi
- No. of seasons: 1
- No. of episodes: 8

Production
- Producers: Harman Baweja; Pammi Baweja
- Camera setup: Multi-camera
- Running time: 36-45 minutes
- Production company: Baweja Studios

Original release
- Network: Amazon MX Player
- Release: 3 April 2026 – present

Kaptaan is a 2026 Hindi-language crime, drama, thriller television series directed by Jatin Satish Wagle under banner of Baweja Studios. It stars Saqib Saleem, Anushka Kaushik, Arif Zakaria, Kavita Kaushik, Siddharth Nigam and Varun Badola in lead roles.

The series premiered on 3 April 2026 on Amazon MX Player.

== Cast ==
- Saqib Saleem as SSP Samardeep Singh
- Kavita Kaushik as Preet
- Anushka Kaushik as Sakshi
- Anjum Sharma as Munna
- Siddharth Nigam as Kabir
- Arif Zakaria as Shaheen
- Pooja Gor as Sonia
- Vikram Kochhar as Tennu
- Varun Badola as Sangwan

== Release ==
The series premiered on 3 April 2026 on Amazon MX Player.

== Episodes ==
=== Season 1 ===
| Series | Episodes | Originally released |
|---|---|---|
| 1 | 8 | 3 April 2026 |

| No. | Title | Directed by | Original release date |
|---|---|---|---|
| 1 | "Welcome To Jwalabad" | Jatin Satish Wagle | 3 April 2026 |
| 2 | "The Past In The Present" | Jatin Satish Wagle | 3 April 2026 |
| 3 | "The Handshake" | Jatin Satish Wagle | 3 April 2026 |
| 4 | "The Big Bang" | Jatin Satish Wagle | 3 April 2026 |
| 5 | "The Threat Reaches Home" | Jatin Satish Wagle | 3 April 2026 |
| 6 | "The Circle Of Light" | Jatin Satish Wagle | 3 April 2026 |
| 7 | "The Pain And The Promise" | Jatin Satish Wagle | 3 April 2026 |
| 8 | "The Unholy Justice" | Jatin Satish Wagle | 3 April 2026 |

== Critical reception ==
Abhishek Srivastava of The Times of India rated the series 3.5/5 and writes "Some plot points raise questions and feel poorly thought out." Sriva A of Moneycontrol writes "Certain plot points stretch logic, particularly when a key informer is exposed and killed, yet the sharp-minded officer at the center fails to connect the dots." A reviewer from Aaj Tak rated the series 2.5/5.
