= Mirzapur (film soundtrack) =

2026 film soundtrack album

Mirzapur: The Movie
- Soundtrack album cover

Soundtrack album by Junaid Kumar, Ray, Anand Bhaskar, Vaibhav Pani, Parry G, Dhanda Nyoliwala, John Stewart Eduri
- Released: 31 August 2026
- Recorded: 2026
- Genre: Feature film soundtrack
- Length: 25:45
- Language: Hindi
- Labels: Excel Music; Universal Music India

Singles from Mirzapur: The Movie
- 1. "Do Numbari" Released: 3 August 2026; 2. "Varoon Forever" Released: 18 August 2026; 3. "Ghoom Ghoom" Released: 27 August 2026

Mirzapur: The Movie is the soundtrack album to the 2026 film of the same name directed by Gurmeet Singh which is based on characters from the Amazon Prime Video television series Mirzapur. The album featured nine tracks with an assortment of musicians Ray, Junaid Kumar, Anand Bhaskar, Dhanda Nyoliwala, Vaibhav Pani, Parry G and John Stewart Eduri. The soundtrack was preceded by three singles and released on 31 August 2026 under the Excel Music and Universal Music India record labels.

== Background ==
Anand Bhaskar and John Stewart Eduri, who previously composed the music for the television series, were incharge of creating the songs and background score, respectively, for the film too. Bhaskar adapted two songs from the series'—"Vaaroon" and "Sajanwa Ki Gunwa"—as "Varoon Forever" and a redux called as "Sajanva". Ginny Diwan, a longtime partner of Bhaskar who wrote the original song as well, also wrote the lyrics for the new version that featured female vocals by Shreya Ghoshal. Diwan admitted that the aim for writing the lyrics is to let the words complement the story and music rather than simply serving the melody, while also saying that Shreya's vocals in collaboration with Romy's provided a unique depth to the song.

In early August, Haryanvi rapper Dhanda Nyoliwala was assigned to compose, write and perform a rap number "Do Numbari" which was touted to complement the "gritty, high-octane world" of the fictional place. Ray composed an item number, titled "Ghoom Ghoom" which was picturised on Sonal Chauhan and sung by Rashmeet Kaur. He had previously worked with Gurmeet Singh on Phone Bhoot (2022), and the director had provided the situation for the song much earlier, after which they worked on the track. Ray added that the song derived a Rajasthani folk influence, with the word "Ghoom" being derived from the song "Ghoomar" from Padmaavat (2018). Previously, the item number was reported to be inspired by "Mehbooba Mehbooba" and was supposed to be composed by Khandel and Junaid Kumar, but it was proven untrue. However, Junaid Kumar did contribute music to one of the songs.

"Sanson Ki Mala", an adaptation of Nusrat Fateh Ali Khan's qawwali "Sanson Ki Mala Pe" was recreated by Vaibhav Pani and performed by Madhur Sharma. Parry G created Kaan Phaad in collaboration with John Stewart, which was the last minute addition to the film created a week prior to the release. The song was essentially a part of the background score.

== Release ==
Mirzapur: The Movie was the first soundtrack to be launched by Excel Music, a subsidiary record label of the production company Excel Entertainment, and was jointly associated with Universal Music India, which had acquired a significant stake in the production company earlier this year, owning the music distribution and publication rights as the label partner; this resulted in the decade-long collaboration between Excel Entertainment and Zee Music Company which had acquired all of their film music rights since Baar Baar Dekho (2016).

The first song "Don Numbari" was released on 3 August 2026. The second song "Varoon Forever" was released on 18 August, and the third song "Ghoom Ghoom" was released on 27 August. The film's music launch was held on 31 August 2026 at the Jio World Garden located in Bandra Kurla Complex in Mumbai. As a part of Universal Music India's "Hear It First" initiative, the film's soundtrack was made available to premium subscribers across all music streaming platforms for a limited period of time after which the soundtrack would be accessible to all users, through ad-supported tiers. This resulted in Mirzapur: The Movie, being the first Hindi film soundtrack to be released in this initiative.

Following the theatrical release of Mirzapur: The Movie, a copyright and cultural dispute arose over the inclusion of the patriotic Rajasthani track "Shoorveer" in the soundtrack. Independent artist Rapperiya Baalam (Ashok Bishnoi) alleged that Excel Entertainment used his work without direct consent or credit. Beyond copyright, Baalam objected to the narrative placement; the track was originally composed as a devotional tribute to the 16th-century warrior king Maharana Pratap. He argued that playing it over an action sequence glorifying fictional gangsters disrespected Rajput history, subsequently serving a legal notice to producers Farhan Akhtar and Ritesh Sidhwani demanding the song's removal, a public apology, and funding for a school named after Maharana Pratap.

The controversy deepened when distribution label Trouper Records countered that they held the legal authority and had officially licensed the track to Excel Entertainment. Baalam's representatives disputed this, asserting that the master copyright registration remained under his real name and that the label lacked synchronization rights without an explicit No Objection Certificate (NOC). The dispute triggered intense socio-political backlash in Rajasthan, where political leaders and members of the Mewar royal family condemned the cinematic placement, writing to the Central Board of Film Certification (CBFC) regarding the misuse of historical imagery.

To mitigate the backlash during subsequent Public Interest Litigation (PIL) proceedings, Excel Entertainment voluntarily removed the song from the film's climax sequence, replacing it with general background music. The Delhi High Court subsequently disposed of the PIL but noted that filmmakers must exercise social responsibility, imposing a ₹50,000 fine on the producers for unauthorized usage to be deposited into the Indian Army Welfare Fund.

== Reception ==
Anuj Kumar of The Hindu felt that the songs and sound design takes time to grow on audiences. Fenil Seta of Bollywood Hungama felt that the songs did not register well, except for "Ghoom Ghoom" being the "best of the lot, more due to the picturization and placement", the rest of the songs being average. Sana Farzeen of India Today wrote "The music is fun, the rap tracks add to the swagger, and yes, Vaaroon makes a comeback, while Sanson Ki Mala adds a soft touch to the ending." Zinia Bandyopadhyay of Firstpost said, "The music, especially the track that will instantly remind you of '[L] Lalit', is impossible to miss [and] gives the film the required tempo".

== Track listing ==
No.	Title	Lyrics	Music	Singer(s)	Length
1.	"Varoon Forever"	Ginny Diwan	Anand Bhaskar	Romy, Shreya Ghoshal	4:12
2.	"Do Numbari"	Dhanda Nyoliwala	Dhanda Nyoliwala	Dhanda Nyoliwala	2:43
3.	"Sanson Ki Mala"	Nusrat Fateh Ali Khan	Nusrat Fateh Ali Khan, Vaibhav Pani	Madhur Sharma	3:08
4.	"Ghoom Ghoom"	Kumaar	Ray	Rashmeet Kaur	3:13
5.	"Vindhyvasini Ki Jai Ho"	Tejpal	Junaid Kumar	Krishna Lasya Muthyala	3:02
6.	"Kaan Phaad"	Parry G	Parry G, John Stewart Eduri	Parry G, Suzanne D'Mello	2:33
7.	"Varoon" (Reprise)	Ginny Diwan	Anand Bhaskar	Shreya Ghoshal	2:38
8.	"Sajanva" (Redux)	Ginny Diwan	Anand Bhaskar	Vidhya Gopal	1:59
9.	"Mirzapur the Bhaukaal Theme"	—	John Stewart Eduri	—	2:13
Total length:					25:45

== Personnel ==
Credits adapted from AA Films:

- Music composer: Junaid Kumar, Ray, Anand Bhaskar, Vaibhav Pani, Parry G, Dhanda Nyoliwala, John Stewart Eduri
- Music producer: Hrishi Giridhar, Tanvi Joshi, Shevv, Ray
- Music editor: Siddheshwar Ekambe
- Arrangements and programming: Junaid Kumar, Ray, Kranthi Sanjay Bobbili
- Music supervisor and creative consultant: Ankur Tewari
- Backing vocals: Vacha Bipin, Soundariya Wankhede, Shivangi Rammurty
- Chorus: Dibyendu Mukherjee, Kinjal Chatterjee, Naresh Mamindla, Sai Madhav, Akhil Chandra
- Acoustic, electric guitar and bass: Vaibhav Pani
- Sarangi: Sudhendu Haldar
- Shehnai: Rudresh Bhajantri
- Harmonium: Omkar Agnihotri
- Flute: Kiran Vinkar
- Studios: The Sanctuary Audiovisual, Mumbai; Bombay Live Studios, Mumbai; A Shock Studios, Chandigarh; Studio DMI, Las Vegas; Sonic Lab, Mumbai; TweakLab Studio, Pune
- Recording engineers: Vedant Uttarkar, Aniruddh Khanna, A Shock, Ray, Aditya Gajula, Ajinkya Dhapare
- Mixing engineers: Prathamesh Dudhane, A Shock, Abhishek Ghatak, Hanish Taneja, Vickey, Aftab Khan, Krina Shah
- Mastering engineers: Prathamesh Dudhane, A Shock, Luca Pretolesi, Alistair Pintus, Hanish Taneja, Levi Owen, Aftab Khan
