= Puncch Beat =

- Genre: Romance; Drama
- Created by: Vikas Gupta
- Directed by: Suyash Vadhavkar
- Creative director: Baljit singh Chaddha
- Starring: Harshita Gaur; Niki Aneja Walia Priyank Sharma; Siddharth Sharma; Khushi Joshi
- Country of origin: India
- Original languages: Hindi; English
- No. of seasons: 2
- No. of episodes: 26

Production
- Cinematography: Anubhav Bansal
- Camera setup: Multi-camera
- Running time: 20 minutes
- Production company: Lost Boy Media Productions Pvt Ltd.

Original release
- Network: ALT Balaji
- Release: 14 February 2019 – 27 June 2021

Puncch Beat is an Indian romantic drama miniseries created and written by Vikas Gupta. The series starsHarshita Gaur, Priyank Sharma, Siddharth Sharma, and Khushi Joshi. This series started streaming on ALT Balaji on the 14 February 2019. In Season 2 this series was started on 27 June 2021.

== Plot ==
The story revolves around Rosewood High, India's premium academic institution which is famous for three things: boxing, dancing and discipline. Rosewood has only one rule which is to obey all rules. But as the new semester starts it unfolds a lot of dark secrets and eventually all rules are broken. Watch the thrilling high school drama where Rahat, a street fighter sets out to challenge Ranbir, an undefeated champion. Amidst all this is Divyanka, a state level dancer who is finding her dancing difficult to pursue for personal reasons and Padmini, the diva. Who will emerge as the actual winner of the school and the challenges of life is the main question.

== Episodes ==
=== Episode 1: Rosewood High ===
Divyanka, her sister Aditi and Rahat arrive at the prestigious institution Rosewood High. Rahat, a street fighter is looking forward to a new beginning as he lost his mother at a very young age and has no clue about his father. Divyanka, a talented Kathak dancer values her mother's ghungroos more than anything else. Meanwhile, Ranbir, the school champion and the head boy of Rosewood High is bullying over a guy, along with his group of friends, as the guy had messed around with Ranbir's girlfriend, Padmini. After stripping the guy and sharing a kiss with Padmini, Ranbir follows the guy who is running wildly through the school campus. While running in the corridors, the guy bumps into Divyanka and her sister. This causes her to trail behind him up to the rooftop. On the other hand, Ranbir stumbles upon Rahat while looking for the guy. Ranbir accidentally takes Rahat's bracelet assuming it to be his own. This causes Rahat to chase him. Eventually Ranbir, Dinky, Rahat and the guy, all end up at the roof. Amidst all these fights, Dinky slips and is hanging from the roof. However, she is saved by Rahat and Ranbir.

=== Episode 2: The Sunny Leone Project ===
The principal of the school, Mrs. Maya Chowdhary, Ranbir's mother, scolds the students for moral policing and for their undisciplined act. She asks Rahat and Dinky, their reasons to be on roof as they were freshers. Rahat and Ranbir have a small debate over the bracelet and Ranbir realises that he had taken Rahat's bracelet. After all this, they are warned and left. Mrs. Bose, a teacher in the school was the aunt of Dinky and Aditi. She asks Padmini and Lara to show the college to Dinky and Aditi. According to an age-old tradition of Rosewood High, a boxing match is set to take place between Oathkeepers and Slayers. Coach Rana realises the potential of Rahat and admits him to the Oathkeepers while Ranbir belonged to the Slayers. All the students are rooting for the reigning champion Ranbir. But Ranbir is set to face the new opponent, Rahat, the street fighter. Ranbir wants all the students of Rosewood to distribute their tokens equally between him and Rahat. Dinky is the first one to buy Rahat's cap. After this, she goes to get her ghungroos from the bag which her aunt had taken away. There she accidentally meets Ranbir, who helps her get the ghungroos. He also tells her that he donates the money earned from the bets to three orphans-Sunny, Leo and Ne. She gives him the idea of acting weak, which causes half the school to apply their bets on Rahat. Hence, Ranbir's plan succeeds.

=== Episode 3: Oathkeepers Vs Slayers ===
The much hyped battle between Oathkeepers and Slayers begins. Ranbir's father as well as an Olympic champion, Rajbir Chowdhury, arrives as the Guest of Honour for the event. Ranbir is continuously winning all the matches successively. Maya wishes Rahat good luck before he enters the ring for his battle with Ranbir. Alongside, Rajbir tells Rahat that he was the only Oathkeeper to beat a Slayer and create history. Rahat tells him that he draws his inspiration from him. However, Rajbir says that he can never win against Ranbir. In the ring, Rahat shows an exemplary performance and survives all the knocks of Ranbir. Although at the end, Ranbir wins, however Rahat wins many hearts. At the after party, Coach Rana and Rajbir have a conversation over their school days and how Rajbir had beaten Rana to become the only Oathkeeper to beat a Slayer. When Maya comes and appreciates Rahat's skills, Rajbir's blood starts boiling and Maya asks all the guests to leave. When Ranbir arrives home, his father insults him and tells him that he could not even beat a street fighter. In his anger, he throws away the medal won by Ranbir. Dinky gets upset and decides to run away when Ms. Bose scolds her for dancing. Elsewhere, Maya and Rajbir are having a fight over Rahat. Rajbir is upset with Maya's inclination towards Rahat and asks her what is so special about that boy. Maya, in a fury of emotions reveals to him that Rahat is his and Nandini's son. However, Rajbir refuses to accept Rahat as his son. Maya argues that Rahat will stay at their house. Rajbir tells her to change her decision or she will regret it. However, she is adamant and he storms out of the room in a fit of rage. All this while, Rahat had been standing outside their house, listening to their conversation. He starts crying hearing all this.

=== Episode 4: Spirit of Brotherhood ===
Ranbir and his group of friend are having fun. Maya is sad reading Nandini's letter. Rahat has left for Mussoorie. Divyanka has also escaped from school. She meets Rahat at the station. Dinky tries talking to him but he ignores her and tells her that he does not need anyone. At Dinky's home, Ms. Bose and Aditi come to know that she has run away. Dinky and Rahat sit at the Chinese stall and eat noodles. However while talking to each other there, they realise that they are committing a mistake. They understand that running away from their problems is not a solution. They decide to return to Rosewood High. Rahat gives away his jacket to Dinky as her kurti is torn. Ranbir is having fun with his friends and as he had full faith in the 'Spirit of Brotherhood', he jumps off from the bridge. His friend save him from falling depicting true friendship. However, other two guys are afraid of jumping. When Rahat returns to Rosewood, Ranbir challenges him to perform this risky stunt. Rahat, in order to prove himself, jumps off from the bridge. Ranbir and his friends hold him. Just then, Coach Rana arrives and notices only Rahat as the other guys run away.

=== Episode 5: One for the Team ===
Coach Rana reprimands Rahat for participating in the dangerous stunt. When Ranbir returns home, he encounters Coach Rana at his house, in a conversation with his mother. His mother asks him about the incident, to which he replies that he knows nothing. Rana says that there were many other guys as well but he could not see their face. When asked about the boys, Rahat saves Ranbir and his friends by telling that there were no other people and he is himself responsible for his actions. Maya replies that then his 25% marks will be cut and since he joined midterm, he is at a very big disadvantage. She also adds that the students will not be allowed to have an after-party. However, Rahat agrees to the punishment and does not reveal the truth. When Rana and Rahat leave, Maya makes Ranbir realises his mistake and makes him understand that he is responsible for his own actions. He is greatly touched by Rahat's behaviour. The next day, Rana is motivating Rahat to practice harder and put in all his efforts. Just then, Ranbir arrives and thanks Rahat for saving him the previous day. He also invites Rahat to the after-party. Dinky and Aditi are mopping the school premises as a punishment by Ms. Bose. Elsewhere, Ranbir and his group of friends are planning for the party. When Aditi leaves, Dinky walks up to Rahat to return his jacket, however he behaves rudely with her. She walks away in anger. Just then, Ranbir trips onto the wet floor. He flirts around a bit with Dinky and later invites her to the party. However she refuses as she had to clean the school premises. He helps her by switching on the fire alarm and hence water falling as emergency cleans up the floor.

While playing, Adhish is asked to kiss Roy on his right side and the game continues. When the chance comes on Ranbir, he is asked to spend 20 minutes in a locked cupboard with a girl of his choice. He chooses Dinky over Padmini which upsets her. Inside the cupboard, Dinky and Ranbir are discussing about love. Elsewhere, things go awfully wrong. Adhish finds her sister, Lara having sex with Roy in a car. This infuriates him and he blasts upon Roy. They get into a heated argument and eventually end up beating each other hard. Padmini realising the gravity of the situation, rushes to the cupboard to call Ranbir. However, she sees Ranbir and Dinky kissing when she opens the door. This leaves both Padmini and Rahat heartbroken.

=== Episode 7: Break a Leg ===
Padmini leaves from there immediately. Lara asks Ranbir to stop Adish and Roy. Eventually, Ranbir intervenes between Roy and Adhish. But Adhish refuses to bury the hatchet and calls for a blood-fight. Ranbir and Roy team up against Adhish. He refuses to take anyone's help and wants to fight by himself. So it is Ranbir and Roy versus Adhish. He gets knocked down by Ranbir in his first punch. Then, Roy enters. He beats him real hard and he falls near Rahat's feet. He supports him and helps him get up. Rahat then steps in, and the fight turns ugly. Rahat ends up punching Roy very hard. When Roy falls down, Ranbir urges Rahat to fight with him and says "Fights should be between equals". Rahat agrees to this and breaks one of Roy's leg. He does this because he wanted Roy to fight with Adhish who had also beaten up badly before and had a broken leg. After being hurt badly, Lara tends to Adhish. There, while Ranbir is tending to Roy, he realises that Padmini is missing. He sets out in search of her and finds her sitting beside the lake. They have a talk over the kissing incident and Padmini understands that Ranbir loves Dinky. She explains to him that she wanted a lifelong love. However, she readily gives up her love for Ranbir's happiness. That night, they break up with a promise that they will always remain best friends. Rahat is emotionally about the recent events and confronts Rajbir. He further gets infuriated and asks Rajbir to accept him as his son. He walks away, vexed and Dinky follows him.

=== Episode 8: The Bastard ===
Ms. Bose takes Dinky and Aditi to the principal to complain about them being at the party as well the previous night. Maya ignores her appeals. Furthermore, she announces that for the cultural development of the school, Rosewood High would take part in the dance competition as well, with Dinky leading the dance team. Dinky gets excited as she receives the written permission for this. While the students are painting outside, Maya comes and tells Rahat that the Board of Trustees wishes to meet him and talk to him about formal complain lodged against him for his inappropriate behaviour the previous night. She adds that though all the students were present at the party, only Rahat was getting punished for his misdeeds. This arouses the 'Spirit of Brotherhood' in them. The Director of the Board of Trustees says that Rahat must be expelled from his school. Soon all the students who were present at the party arrive and confess their crimes. Ranbir tells that it was his idea to arrange a party, Lara agrees that she arranges for the drinks and Padmini accepts that she invited the DJ at the party. All the students stand in solidarity with Rahat. Maya says that since all the students are responsible, it is her decision as the principal that none of them should be punished. However, The Director argues that the privilege that Rahat had- joining the school midterm-was enjoyed only by the children of the trustees. Then he puts the issue to vote and the trustees including Rajbir vote to rusticate Rahat. But Maya intervenes and tells that Rahat is not a charity case. She reveals the truth that he is the son of Rajbir Chowdhary. This angers Ranbir and he storms out. Rajbir tells Rahat that he was the biggest mistake that he committed and runs out crying. Padmini, being Ranbir's best friend goes to console as well as motivate him and tells him that no one can take his place. Dinky is practicing her dance when she hears Rahat crying. She rushes beside him and makes him understand that he is not a mistake and it was not his fault. Amidst this overflow of emotions, Rahat and Dinky kiss, witnessed by Ranbir, which leaves him infuriated.

=== Episode 9: Yin and Yang ===
At the dinner table, Ranbir behaves rudely with his parents. His mother brings him a pie, to which he says that the pie is only his. When his parents want to talk to him about the sudden revelation, he bluntly tells them that when he cannot share his pie with anyone, he will never share his family. Maya announces that this year, Rosewood High would be hosting the Phoenix Tournament. She tells that Ranbir, the school champion would represent Rosewood High at the tournament in boxing. Since, Roy was injured badly, Rahat was replaced him as the second boxer at the tournament. Divyanka was chosen to represent Rosewood High at the dance competition. Dinky chooses Padmini as her dance partner and they have a small discussion over the ring that Ranbir had gifted Padmini, four years ago. At the Holi Celebrations, Maya and Rahat let go off that one thing that has been holding them back in life. Aditi gets enraged that Dinky had chosen Padmini over her as a partner, for maintaining the school reputation. She hurls abuses and insults at her sister which leaves Dinky heartbroken. Ranbir follows Aditi as she leaves and makes her smile even in her depressed mood which impresses her greatly. At the Holika, Adhish and Lara reconcile. Adhish tells Rahat that Lara is her adopted sister. When Dinky reaches home after practice, she sees Aditi talking over the phone with Ranbir and asks her when she and Ranbir became friends. She rudely walks away. Padmini throws the ring that Ranbir had gifted her into the Holika. Maya asks Rahat what he wanted to offer to the dahan. He replies nothing. She then tells him of the last letter she had of his mother. They together offer the letter to the Holika. She blesses Rahat and hugs him. Again, Ranbir sees this and this adds to his anger.

=== Episode 10: True Colors ===
At the annual Holi Celebrations, everyone is enjoying. Padmini rushes to apply colour to Dinky but she says that she and Aditi will apply colour to each other first. However, she sees Aditi playing Holi with Ranbir and this leads to further argument between them. Dinky then tells Ranbir to stay away from her sister. Maya forcefully asks Ranbir and Rahat to apply colours to each other which they eventually do. Dinky upset about the situation, sits beside the pool and is soon joined by Rahat. They spend some quality time together. On the other, Aditi gets intimate with Ranbir. In the night Dinky and Rahat walk hand in hand on the streets when all of a sudden Rahat is attacked by some people wearing black hoodies. They beat him mercilessly. By chance, Rajbir and Maya's car stops there and they come to help Rahat. They find out that it was none other than their own son, Ranbir, who had planned all this. Rahat is badly injured and is taken to the hospital by Maya and Dinky. There, Rajbir approaches him. He, firstly behaves very nicely and affectionately towards Rahat. However, soon he says that he should have never had sex with his mother. He further adds that she was very desperate for him and wanted him badly. He again repeats that he regrets Rahat's existence in his life and is ashamed of his mistake. All this while, Dinky stands outside, listening to the conversation and crying. When Rajbir leaves, Dinky enters. Rahat, being emotionally drained out, gets restless. Dinky tends to his wounds that had started bleeding again. Rahat tells her that his mother's love failed. However, Dinky tells him that no one has the right to question his existence and his mother truly loved him. He says that love is bullshit and he does not believe in it. She argues that love is life and everything. During this conversation, Rahat pins Dinky to the cupboard and they again share a kiss. However, soon Rahat shouts at Dinky and asks her to leave. Everyone- Rahat, Ranbir, Rajbir, Maya and Dinky is upset.

=== Episode 11: Phoenix ===
All the students are preparing for the prestigious tournament. Ranbir and Rahat are having a tough competition. Just then, Rajbir arrives and has an argument with Coach Rana. He says that he does not trust Rana's coaching and hence from then on Ranbir will train under him. Rahat tell Coach Rana that he has a tough time concentrating since so much is going on his life. The coach gives him a pep talk. He tells him all the anger that he has inside him must come out in the ring. He gives him the example of Mohammed Ali and tells him that he taught everyone that we can never let people or emotions take control over ourselves and we must learn to fight them. He also tells him that Rajbir Chowdhary has everything that he could have owned. This was because he was the only Slayer who had lost to an Oathkeeper- Rajbir. He makes him understand he must learn to channelize his anger at the right place. This motivates him and he decides to fight back with all his best. Dinky and Padmini also continue their vigorous practice. Meanwhile, Ranbir starts ignoring Aditi. The day of the phoenix Tournament arrives and all the schools are welcomed by Rosewood High. She then calls upon Rajbir to decide the fighters for the boxing tournament. He deliberately puts Rahat against a tough competitor. At the Chinese center, Dinky is eating her noodles. When Rahat arrives, she tells him that they are not supposed to talk. Despite that Rahat apologizes to her for his rudeness. The shopkeeper then tells her that Rahat had been visiting the shop for a very long time. He used to order food but he never ate it in wait of Dinky. She realizes that Rahat also loves her. They finish their noodles and then return to the school, hand in hand.

=== Episode 12: Knockout 1 ===
Rahat takes on his tough opponent. Rajbir knows for sure he will lose. Right before her Dance performance, Divyanka faces betrayal. Aditi also learns the true side of Ranbir. Rajbir agrees to give his name to Rahat. But he wants a sacrifice from Rahat.

=== Episode 13: Knockout 2 ===
Ranbir and Rahat battle it out in the finals. It is a tough match to watch as both the boys spare no mercy on each other. Divyanka tries to make it to her dance performance without a partner. Aditi gets to know she is pregnant because of Ranbir and takes poison. Divyanka seeing Aditi's battle for life, goes to the ring and knocks down Ranbir with the chair. At last, the referee announces that the match has been cancelled due to the circumstance and there is a chance for a rematch.

=== Episode 1: Dark Beginnings ===
Mira tries to seduce Rahat, leading Divyanka to end their relationship, and highlights the rivalry between Rahat and Ranbir, culminating in a challenging match between them. Inspector Vishnu, who is there to investigate the death of a student at the prestigious Rosewood High. Rahat is appointed as the new head boy leadership of the school. Ranbir, a prominent student, is unhappy with Rahat's new position. At a troubled party, Mira tries to seduce Rahat. Divyanka's Departure Divyanka is upset by Mira's actions and leaves the party. A Darker Atmosphere establishes a sinister atmosphere, with the investigation into a death hinting at the dangerous secrets within Rosewood High.

=== Episode 2:Old Flames - New Love ===
Rahat is appointed the new Head Boy of Rosewood High, a decision that does not sit well with Ranbir. Meesha's influence on Ranbir to her club and gives him a present for his upcoming boxing match against Rahat. The rivalry between Rahat and Ranbir continues to escalate, fueled by their different backgrounds and ongoing conflicts within the school.

=== Episode 3: Confessions of Rosewood High ===
The students are excited for the annual Holi celebrations, a time for releasing their past issues. Divyanka is selected to represent Rosewood High at a dance competition and chooses Padmini as her dance partner. Aditi is angered by Dinky's decision to partner with Padmini, feeling it was to uphold the school's reputation, and she confronts and insults Dinky. Ranbir consoles Aditi, making her smile and impressing her greatly. Maya and Rahat burn Rahat's mother's last letter in the Holika. Ranbir's Anger observes on Maya and Rahat's interaction and his anger intensifies.

=== Episode 4: Why did she lie? ===
Divyanka gets good news as she receives an acceptance for her scholarship to the New York Dance Academy. Padmini and Rahat are shown to be involved in some undisclosed plans, suggesting they are working together behind the scenes. Mallika instigates questions Aditi about her pregnancy, seeking to uncover the truth behind the news. Ranbir is taken by Meesha to see her club.

=== Episode 5: A Chance at Redemption ===
The central plot involves the murder of a student within the school. Friends as they become shocking event quickly turns the close-knit group of friends into suspects, creating an atmosphere of distrust and turning them into enemies. The secret revealed investigation into the murder uncovers a multitude of secrets that have been kept hidden, leading to potential destruction of the friends' relationships. A Test of Loyalty bounds the bonds between the main characters as they are forced to confront difficult truths and decide whom to trust.

=== Episode 6: Good Byes are Tough ===
The students are still recovering from the events of the previous year, particularly the murder that took place at the MMA fight. Emotional Turmoil turns into the explores the emotional toll the incident has taken on the students, including the fracturing of friendships and relationships. The ongoing investigation into the murder at the school is a central focus, uncovering secrets that could further damage the students' bonds.

=== Episode 7: Everyone is a Suspect ===
The unexpected murder of a student at Rosewood High. Everyone is a Suspect of the murder investigation turns everyone connected to the school into a suspect. Secrets are Revealed also intensified the intense investigation leads to the exposure of various secrets held by the students and staff. Relationships are Tested into The secrets uncovered during the investigation put the relationships between the characters under immense pressure. Friends who Become Foes of the shock of the murder and the subsequent revelations cause a deep rift, turning friends into enemies.

=== Episode 8: Skeletons in the closet ===
As the sudden death of a student during an MMA fight, which plunges the school into chaos. The murder creates an atmosphere of suspicion, making the friends turn against each other as the investigation begins. Uncovering Dark Secrets is revealed in a central theme is the unearthing of the dark and hidden secrets of Rosewood High as the students and faculty try to solve the mystery. Maya's Revelation has tried to figured out Vikrant's true identity, adding another layer of complexity to the unfolding events. Coach Rana's Intervention is secret in the aftermath, Coach Rana sets the record straight with Mallika regarding Rahat's fake test reports, indicating a possible attempt at deception. Adeesh's decides to make up for a past mistake, hinting at potential character growth and plot developments for his character.

=== Episode 9: Wild Card ===
Ranbir is visibly upset after witnessing the use of the performance-enhancing drug X-AMP. Maya and Padmini acquire the results of Ranbir's drug test. Adeesh and Lara's Confrontation as Adeesh finds the drug and approaches Lara, leading to a tense encounter. Bansuri's Resignation reacts to makes the decision to resign from her role at Rosewood High. Rahat's goes to the actions as they were intends to goes to the MMA Academy. Vikrant intends to appoint Mallika as the new discipline in-charge, a move that requires a vote from the trustees. The unfolding drama involves the escalating consequences of drug use within the school, revealing hidden motives and forcing characters to make difficult decisions.

=== Episode 10: Boys don't Cry ===
Ranbir is in the hospital, and his family, including a furious Rajbir, is at his bedside. Maya and Rajbir's Conflict as Maya reveals to Rajbir that Rahat is his son, which angers him, leading to an argument and him storming out. Rahat's Realization overhears Maya and Rajbir's conversation and learns the truth about his parentage. Mallika confronts Aditi about her pregnancy news. Divyanka and Padmini's Plans as to receives news about a New York dance academy and plans to go with Padmini and Rahat. Maya discovers Vikrant's true identity, adding another layer of intrigue to the plot.

=== Episode 11: I Confess ===
Ranbir is in the hospital, with his family present. Mallika arrives with fabricated test reports for Rahat, but Coach Rana confronts her and exposes the falsehood. Adeesh resolves to fix the damage he caused. Maya's Discovery how intends figures out the true identity of Vikrant.

=== Episode 12: A Father's Legacy ===
Maya reveals to Rajbir that Rahat is his son, which Rajbir initially struggles to accept. Rajbir storms out in rage after Maya insists Rahat stay with them, but later agrees to give Rahat his name. A sacrifice is requested for Rajbir's condition for acknowledging Rahat as his son is for Rahat to make a sacrifice for him. Rahat's loyalty is tested as he intends to tands up to his opponent during a boxing match, demonstrating his loyalty and earning Rajbir's reluctant approval. Aditi uncovers a secret to learns the truth about Ranbir's true nature, hinting at a betrayal or deception.

=== Episode 13: The Trap ===
Aftermath of a murder at Rosewood High, with the students grappling with the death of one of their own. An Unforeseen Incident picks up a year with the students still dealing with the impact of the murder, which occurred during an MMA fight. An investigation into the crime scene is launched, and as it progresses, a multitude of secrets begin to emerge, potentially altering or even breaking relationships among the students. In the thriller's Edge is described as a spine-chilling plot, leaving viewers on the edge of their seats as they question the true nature of the incident.

== Cast ==
=== Main ===
- Harshita Gaur as Divyanka Tripathi
- Priyank Sharma as Rahat Sharma
- Siddharth Sharma as Ranbir Chowdhary
- Niki Aneja Walia as Maya
- Khushi Joshi as Padmini Arora

=== Recurring ===
- Kajol Tyagi as Lara
- Ujjwal Gauraha as Coach
- Nikhil Bhambri as Adhish
- Krishna Kaul as Roy Malhotra
- Sindhuja Turlapati as Aditi Tripathi
- Mrinmai Kolwalkar as Bansuri
- Jayati Bhatia as Miss Gayatri Bose
- Samir Soni as Rajbir Chaudhary
- Niki Aneja Walia as Maya Chaudhary
- Mehak Ghai as Jasmine
- Urfi Javed as Meera
- Divya Agarwal as herself
- Karan Kundrra as himself
- Mohit Tiwari as Friend
- Samyuktha Hegde as Meesha
- Sindhuja Turlapati as Aditi
- Nikhil Bhambri as Adeesh
- Kajol Tyagi as Lara
- Anuj Choudhry as Inspector Vishnu
- Poppy Jabbal as Mallika
- Rushad Rana as Rana
