= Gone Kesh =

2019 Hindi comedy-drama film

- Theatrical release poster
- Directed by: Qasim Khallow
- Written by: Qasim Khallow
- Produced by: Dhiraj Ghosh
- Starring: Shweta Tripathi; Jitendra Kumar; Vipin Sharma; Deepika Amin; Brijendra Kala
- Cinematography: Abhi Dange
- Edited by: Ashutosh Matela
- Music by: Score: Sanchit Choudhary; Bishakh Jyoti; Songs: Kanish Sharma; Bishakh Jyoti; Bharat-Hitarth
- Production company: Dhirendra Nath Ghosh Films
- Distributed by: Eros International
- Release date: 29 March 2019
- Running time: 110 minutes
- Country: India
- Language: Hindi

Gone Kesh (transl. Hair gone) is a 2019 Indian Hindi-language comedy drama film written and directed by debutant Qasim Khallow and produced by Dhiraj Ghosh. The film follows the story of a teenage girl who is an aspiring dancer but is diagnosed with alopecia, a condition where she starts losing hair rapidly. It stars Shweta Tripathi and Jitendra Kumar in the lead roles, while Vipin Sharma, Deepika Amin and Brijendra Kala appear in supporting roles. Gone Kesh was released on 29 March 2019.

== Plot ==
Enakshi Dasgupta lives with her parents in a middle class household in Siliguri. Her father Mr. Dasgupta, owns a wristwatch shop at the local Hong Kong market while her mother is a housewife. Enakshi starts experiencing excessive hair fall during her school life. Every day, she starts losing patches of hair from her head. Her classmates made fun of her and started calling her "brown island" as the bald patches on her head surrounded by hair, resembled an island surrounded by water. She feels emotionally down and upon sharing the event with her parents, her father painted the bald patch with black marker to conceal it. It was of no use and she continued to lose more hair daily.

So, her parents decided to see her a trichologist. He prescribes medicines but they don't have any effect. After that they visited a dermatologist but his medications also turn out to be futile. Then, her father started to feed her only carrot and stopped her oil and mutton consumption. He believed that it would help Enakshi to regain her hair. It also doesn't work and she continues to lose hair. To avoid public shame, she starts using a dupatta to cover her head while going to school. But she gets more emotionally broken down as her classmates call her GK a.k.a. Gone Kesh.

In the meantime, Mr. Dasgupta listens from one of his neighbouring shop owner that he has recently travelled by air. This rekindled Mr. Dasgupta's long time dream to visit the Taj Mahal with his wife. He decided to fulfill his wife's wish and also travel by air.

Morally destroyed, Enakshi decided to not attend her annual school function where she used to present a dance performance every year. Despite being a good dancer, she not wanted to face any further insult. She breaks into tears. Unable to his daughter's trauma, her father assured her to take her to a major private hospital for her treatment, at any cost. They visit the doctor, do the prescribed tests and after it, she is diagnosed with alopecia. The doctor informs that steroid injections on her scalp is the only way to regain her hair but it is costly and has certain side effects. Determined to see her daughter happy, Enakshi's father to do the treatment. Successfully, she gained back her hair as well as her lost confidence. She stops wearing a veil and passes her 12th Boards with first division.

But due to the side effect of steroids, she experiences hair growth on her face. So, they stopped the therapy and as result, she lost all her hair again. By this time, she had become completely bald. The doctor suggested her to use a wig. She starts wearing a synthetic wig daily. After passing the college, they are troubled to get a groom for her daughter. Once a boy's family came to see the girl but fled as soon as she revealed her bald head. Every boy's family arranged by the pandit, refused after learning she is bald.

After college, Enakshi works as a salesgirl in a makeup brand outlet in the Siliguri Mall. On the occasion of Durga Puja, a dance competition was being held at the mall. Enakshi wanted to enroll her name but faced rejection as mall employees were not allowed to participate in the event. Torn between her job and passion, she resigned from her job and enrolled her name.

In the meantime, Srijesh visits their house. He has loved her since the college days but was never able to express his feelings. He works as the manager in a shoe shop in the same mall and would often ask her for a momo date, before she had left her job. But she always refused. On visiting their house, he was baffled to see her bald. Panic-stricken, Enakshi asked him for a momo date. She asks him if he would still like her after seeing her baldness. But Srijesh says that he has always loved her and will continue to do so. He proposes marriage to her, to which she happily agrees. Her parents are delighted by the news.

Together with her family, Srijesh goes to the dance competition at the mall. But a child mistakenly pulls her wig. It exposed her bald head in front of everyone. She hurriedly runs to the washroom and cries there and decides to not dance at the competition. But upon persuasion from her parents and Srijesh, she performs without her wig, to the audience's surprise. Her parents broke into tears but the crowd appreciated her and supported her with applause.

She marries Srijesh. A year later, she returns to enroll the names of the students from her own dance academy. Now, she has started a dance academy, pursued her passion, and no longer wears a wig. She has realised that differences are nothing to be ashamed of.

== Cast ==
- Shweta Tripathi as Enakshi Dasgupta
- Jitendra Kumar as Srijoy
- Vipin Sharma as A.Dasgupta, Enakshi's father
- Deepika Amin as Debashree Dasgupta, Enakshi's mother
- Brijendra Kala as Alok, wig-shop owner
- Bharti Doshi as Enakshi's aunt (mausi)
- Shashi Kiran as Pandit

== Soundtrack ==
Gone Kesh

Soundtrack album by Kanish Sharma, Bharath-Hitarth and Bishakh Jyoti
- Released: 22 March 2019
- Recorded: 2018
- Genre: Feature film soundtrack
- Length: 21:33
- Language: Hindi
- Label: Zee Music Company
External audio
- Audio Jukebox on YouTube

The music of the film is composed by Kanish Sharma, Bharath Hitarth and Bishakh Jyoti while the lyrics are penned by Devendra Kafir, Majaal and Bharath Menaria. The Background Score is composed by Sanchit Choudhary and Bishakh Jyoti

Track listing
No.	Title	Lyrics	Music	Singer(s)	Length
1.	"Bibi"	Devendra Kafir	Kanish Sharma	Shahid Mallya, Asees Kaur	3:23
2.	"Dil Dhoondhata He"	Majaal	Kanish Sharma	Mohan Kannan	3:23
3.	"Me Udi"	Bharath Menaria	Bharath-Hitarth	Yashita Sharam	4:20
4.	"Beimani Se"	Majaal	Bishakh Jyoti	Mahalakshmi Iyer	6:15
5.	"Nuskha Tarana"	Majaal	Kanish Sharma	Kavita Seth	4:12
Total length:					21:33

== Reception ==
=== Critical response ===
Renuka Vyavahare of The Times of India gives 3.5/5 stars and says, "Despite the film’s languid pace, this one’s a winner – hair or no hair. It also reminds you that good people end up with good people, always." Rahul Desai writing for Film Companion gives 3.5/5 stars and finds it, "disarmingly simple and well-acted story that resists the temptation of looking good in order to feel good."

Hindustan Times rates the film with 2.5/5 stars and states "...despite its short-comings, Gone Kesh, is one feeble yet brave attempt." Anupama Chopra of Film Companion gives 2.5/5 stars with remarks, "Warm and humorous but may have been better as a short film." and concludes the review as, "Despite the right intentions and strong performances, the sweetness of the story barely lingers." Nandini Ramnath of Scroll.in writes, "The parents turn out to be the movie’s most beautiful characters. Vipin Sharma and Deepika Amin turn out solid performances, and movingly portray a couple who have sacrificed their dreams for their only daughter."
