= Chand Chupa Badal Mein =

2010 Indian TV series

- Genre: Drama
- Created by: Director Kut's Productions
- Written by: Saba Mumtaz; Vandana Tewari
- Directed by: Rajan Shahi; Neeraj Baliyan
- Starring: Neha Sargam; Kinshuk Mahajan; Abhishek Tewari; Nitika Anand; Payal Nair; Ashish Kapoor; Kanan Malhotra; Sarita Joshi; Geeta Tyagi
- Country of origin: India
- Original language: Hindi
- No. of episodes: 261

Production
- Producer: Rajan Shahi
- Editor: Sameer Gandhi
- Running time: 24 minutes

Original release
- Network: StarPlus
- Release: 28 June 2010 – 17 June 2011

Chand Chupa Badal Mein (English : The moon is hiding behind the clouds) is an Indian drama by Rajan Shahi's Director's Kut Productions. It premiered on 28 June 2010 and ended on 17 June 2011. It was directed by Rajan Shahi and Neeraj Baliyan.

== Plot ==
Set in the beautiful hill town of Simla, Chand Chupa Badal Mein narrates the tale of a middle-class girl Nivedita Sharma a.k.a. Nivi, a.k.a. Putul. She is kind, sweet, responsible, but also nervous and reserved. She lost her mother when she was a little girl. Since then, she has been living with her grandmother, father and younger brother.

Nivedita meets her childhood friend Siddharth Sood after many years, and the two fall in love with each other. But on discovering that her cousin Divya also loves Siddharth, Nivi unhesitatingly sacrifices her love by pretending that she is indifferent to him. Under pressure from his family and hurt by Nivi's rejection, Siddharth marries Divya. And Nivi marries Siddharth's cousin Viren.

Later, it is revealed that Viren married Nivi to take revenge against Siddharth and his family. However, gradually both Nivi and Viren start caring for each other. When Nivi discovers Viren's real intentions, she transforms him and brings him closer to his family. Their lives take many more twists and turn from there. The shy Nivi blossoms into a confident woman with the help of Viren, meeting challenges with unshakable optimism.

== Cast ==
Cast	Character	Description
Neha Sargam	Nivedita Viren Sood	Siddharth's ex-love and Viren's wife
Kinshuk Mahajan	Viren Sood	Nivedita's husband
Abhishek Tiwari	Siddharth Sood	Nivedita's ex-love and Divya's husband
Rishma Rochlani	Divya Siddharth Sood	Siddharth's wife
Nitika Anand	Vandana Sood	Siddharth's mother
Payal Nair	Chanchal Sood	Viren's mother
Ashish Kapoor	Jawahar Sood	Viren's father
Madan Joshi	Bhupat Sood	Siddharth and Viren's grandfather
Kanan Malhotra	Aditya Pratap Sharma	Divya's brother
Sarita Joshi	Naintara Sharma	Nivedita and Divya's grandmother
Geeta Tyagi	Hemlata Pratap Sharma	Divya's mother
Krish Kakkar	Young Siddharth	

=== Guests ===
- Hina Khan
- Karan Mehra
- Adaa Khan

== Production ==
=== Development ===
Poet and lyricist Javed Akhtar introduced the show with a recitation. He also lent his voice to the promotions of the show. Some scenes were shot in the environs of Himachal Pradesh.

=== Filming ===
The story being based on backdrop of Shimla, a set of Shimla was created in 35,000 sq feet area in Mumbai Film City for shooting the series with about planting of 200 trees; the sets of mountains, streams and wooden cottages with rooms were also created to recreate Shimla. These all cost about ₹ 3 crores to construct.
