= Neha Sargam =

Indian actress

- Born: Neha Dubey; Patna, Bihar, India
- Occupation: Actress; and Singer
- Years active: 2010-present
- Known for: Chand Chupa Badal Mein; Ramayan; Doli Armaano Ki; Mirzapur

Neha Dubey, also known by her stage name Neha Sargam, is an Indian actress and singer. Known for her participation on Indian Idol 4 and her shows like Chand Chupa Badal Mein on Star Plus, Ramayan on Zee TV, Doli Armano Ki on Zee TV, Mirzapur and theatre musical Mughal-E-Azam

== Career ==
Sargam had auditioned in Indian Idol 2, but she forgot the lyrics in the second audition and was rejected. She had appeared in Indian Idol 4 in 2009. She appears in the cast for Chand Chupa Badal Mein, as well as Ramayan as Sita.

She played the part of Lakshmi in Paramavatar Shri Krishna. Sargam has also worked in the serials, she did a cameo in Punar Vivaah - Zindagi Milegi Dobara and Doli Armaano Ki, as main lead post leap as Diya Iss Pyaar Ko Kya Naam Doon? Ek Baar Phir, and Yeh Hai Aashiqui.

Sargam has been a part of two musical plays as actor and singer in the lead Mughal-E-Azam the musical directed by Feroz Abbas Khan, produced by Shapoorji Pallonji Group. and Raunaq and Jassi musical produced by BookMyShow and directed by Feroz Abbas Khan.

=== Web series ===
In 2020, Sargam played the role of Saloni Tyagi in Mirzapur season 2 & 3.

== Filmography ==
=== Television ===
Year	Show	Character	Notes
2010–2011	Chand Chupa Badal Mein	Nivedita Viren Sood	
2010	Sapna Babul Ka... Bidaai	Nivedita Viren Sood	from Chand Chupa Badal Mein
2011	Yeh Rishta Kya Kehlata Hai	Nivedita Viren Sood	from Chand Chupa Badal Mein
2011	Haar Jeet		
2012–2013	Ramayan	Sita	
2013	Savdhaan India	Madhu	
2013	Yeh Hai Aashiqui		
2013	Punar Vivaah - Zindagi Milegi Dobara	Neelam	Minister's daughter
2014	Iss Pyaar Ko Kya Naam Doon? Ek Baar Phir	Aditi	
2015	Doli Armaanon Ki	Diya Tiwari	
2016	Naya MahiSagar		
2017–2020	Paramavatar Shri Krishna	Lakshmi	
2022	Yashomati Maiyaa Ke Nandlala	Yashoda	

=== Web series ===
Year	Show	Character	Notes
2020	Mirzapur (TV series)	Saloni Tyagi	(Season 2 -3)
