= Anangsha Biswas =

Indian film actress

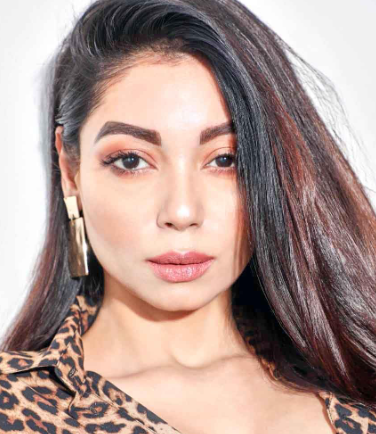
- Occupation: Actor
- Years active: 2007–present

Anangsha Biswas Is an Indian actress known for her roles in Bollywood and web series such as Mirzapur on Amazon Prime, Hostages on Hotstar, Pratibimb on YouTube, Ascharyachakit on Netflix.

== Theatre background ==
Anangsha Biswas performed theatre with Naseeruddin Shah, Benjamin Gilani, Farid Currim, Shefali Shah, Akash Khurana etc. in Mumbai. She later went to Sydney to study acting from Tafta.

== Career ==
Anangsha made her screen debut with a small role as a child actress in Sudhir Mishra's Khoya Khoya Chand. She then played a role in Luv Shuv Tey Chicken Khurana and later she came into limelight with her role in an Amazon Prime web series Mirzapur.

== Filmography ==
=== Films ===
Year	Film	Role	Notes
2009	Rann	News Anchor	
2010	Benny and Babloo	Sony / Akruti	
2012	Luv Shuv Tey Chicken Khurana	Shama Chatterjee	
2019	Fraud Saiyaan	Astha	
2024	Bastar: The Naxal Story	Lakshmi	
2026	Mirzapur	Zarina	

=== Series ===
Year	Film	Role	Notes
2018	Maaya 2	Beena Jha	
2018–present	Mirzapur	Zarina	
2019–2020	Hostages	Hyma	
2023	Kaala	Maryam	
