= Mirzapur, Kamrup Metropolitan district =

Villages in Kamrup Metropolitan district

Mirzapur
- Village
- Map of Assam Mirzapur (India)
- Coordinates: 26.1182°N 91.59609°E
- Country: India
- State: Assam
- District: Kamrup Metro
- Region: Azara

Area
  - Total: 193.84 ha (479.0 acres)
- Elevation: 54 m (177 ft)

Population (2011)
  - Total: 3,355
  - Density: 1,731/km^{2} (4,483/sq mi)

Languages
  - Official: Assamese
- Time zone: UTC+5:30 (IST)
- Postal code: 781017
- STD Code: 0361
- Vehicle registration: AS-01
- Census code: 303407

Mirzapur is a census village in Azara Circle of Kamrup Metropolitan district, Assam, India. As per 2011 Census of India, the village has population of total 3,355 people, out of which 1,677 are males and 1,678 are females.
