= Shweta Tripathi =

Indian actress (b. 1985)

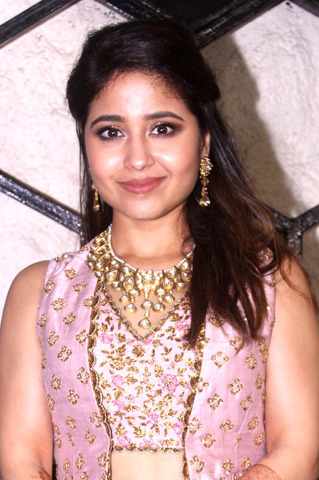
- Tripathi in 2018
- Born: Shweta Tripathi; 6 July 1985 (age 41); New Delhi, India
- Education: National Institute of Fashion Technology
- Occupations: Actor, poet
- Years active: 2009–present
- Spouse: Chaitanya Sharma (m. 2018)

Shweta Tripathi (née Tripathi; born 6 July 1985) is an Indian actress popularly known for the character of Golu Gupta in Mirzapur. She began her film career as a production assistant and associate director and gained wider recognition and accolades for her acting performances in the Hindi film industry and web series. Notable films include Masaan (2015) and Haraamkhor (2017).

== Early life ==
Tripathi was born on 6 July 1985 in New Delhi. Her father works for the Indian Administrative Service and her mother is a retired teacher. The family moved a lot due to her father's job. Tripathi spent her childhood in Andaman and Nicobar Islands and Mumbai, Maharashtra. She describes her time in Andaman as her happiest: "That’s when I discovered how much I like travelling and being outdoors. Every weekend used to be a picnic on a new island, and it was an enriching experience".

Tripathi moved back to New Delhi to pursue secondary education and attended the Delhi Public School, RK Puram. She then studied at National Institute of Fashion Technology and graduated with a degree in Fashion Communication.

== Personal life ==
Tripathi married actor and rapper Chaitanya Sharma on 29 June 2018 in Goa.

== Career ==
Tripathi is known for a variety of roles she has played over the years. She first gained recognition for her role in Masaan, where she played Actor Vicky Kaushal's girlfriend. She has also appeared in advertisements for brands such as Tata Sky, McDonald's, and Vodafone. She also appears in ads for Tata Sky download, McDonald's, Tanishq, and most recently Tata Tea. She was also a photo editor for the women's magazine, Femina. Before her work on the sitcom Kya Mast Hai Life, she worked at Pixion trailer house, a post-production house in Mumbai, and also ran a theater company called All My Tea Productions.

She was a part of The Trip on Bindass and made her Tamil debut with Mehandi Circus directed by Saravana Rajendran. She was also a part of the movie Zoo, India's first feature-length movie shot entirely on an iPhone. Shweta later appeared in the web series Mirzapur as Golu Gupta in which her masturbation scene was praised for its frank portrayal of women's sexuality. Tripathi's latest film Gone Kesh is her most ambitious wherein she plays an adolescent dancer who develops alopecia and loses her hair and her self-esteem.

She is also admired for her role in TVF Tripling in the 3rd episode of season 2 as Begum Zainab, who is in love with the elderly Nawab. In season 2 of Laakhon Mein Ek, she played the lead role of Dr. Shreya. She was next be seen in Disney+ Hotstar's web series Escaype Live. She also produced a movie recently.

== Filmography ==
=== Films ===
Year	Title	Role	Notes
2011	Trishna	Shweta	
2011	Sujata	Young Sujata	Short film
2015	Masaan	Shaalu Gupta	Won – Zee Cine Award for Best Supporting Actress
2016	Love Shots		Short film
2017	Haraamkhor	Sandhya	
2018	Beautiful World		Short film
2018	Zoo	Misha	
2019	Gone Kesh	Enakshi Dasgupta	Released on Eros Now
2019	Mehandi Circus	Mehandi	Tamil film
2019	The Illegal	Mahi	English film
2020	Raat Akeli Hai	Karuna Singh	Released on Netflix
2020	Cargo	Yuvishka Shekhar	Released on Netflix
2021	Rashmi Rocket	Maya Bhasin	Released on ZEE5
2023	Kanjoos Makhichoos	Madhuri Pandey	Released on ZEE5
2026	Mirzapur: The Movie	Gajgamani "Golu" Gupta	Completed
TBA	Ticket To Bollywood	TBA	Pre-production

=== Web series ===
Year	Title	Role	Platform	Notes	Ref.
2009–2010	Kya Mast Hai Life	Zenia Khan	Disney Channel		
2012–2013	Suite Life of Karan and Kabir	Minne	Disney Channel	Season 2; Episode 44	
2016–2018	The Trip	Ananya	Bindass		
2018–present	Mirzapur	Gajgamini "Golu" Gupta	Amazon Prime Video		
2019	Made in Heaven	Priyanka Mishra	Amazon Prime Video	Episode: "The Price of Love"	
2019	TVF Tripling	Begum Zainab	Sony LIV	Episode: "Kabootar Ja Ja"	
2019	Laakhon Mein Ek	Dr. Shreya Pathare	Amazon Prime Video	Season 2	
2020–present	The Gone Game	Amara Gujral	JioCinema		
2022	Yeh Kaali Kaali Ankhein	Shikha	Netflix		
2022	Escaype Live	Sunaina	Disney Plus Hotstar		
2023	Kaalkoot	Parul Chaturvedi	JioCinema		
