= Harshita Gaur =

Indian actress (born 1990)

Harshita Shekhar Gaur
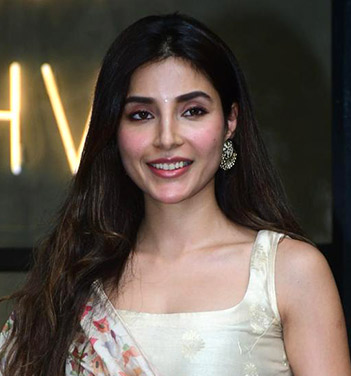
- Gaur in 2025
- Born: 12 October 1990 (age 36); Delhi, India
- Occupations: Actor; dancer
- Years active: 2013–present
- Known for: Mirzapur; Sadda Haq

Harshita Shekhar Gaur (born 12 October 1990) is an Indian actress known for her work on the youth-based show Sadda Haq, in which she played the lead role of Sanyukta Agarwal and Dimpy Pandit in the 2018 web series Mirzapur.

== Early life and career ==
Harshita Gaur was born in New Delhi to a family of doctors. She completed her studies in engineering at Amity University, Noida, where she also participated in drama and creative societies. She started her career as a model, and while she was still pursuing her engineering studies, she got an offer from Sadda Haq, which marked her television debut. She managed to act while finishing her studies.

Gaur is also a trained Kathak dancer and has performed in stage shows across India. She has also performed in many commercials, including Dabur Vatika hair oil, Garnier light cream, and Sunsilk. Her latest commercial ad is for Renault Kwid. In 2018, she was hired for the role of 'Dimpy Pandit' in the Amazon Prime web series Mirzapur and was highly praised for her performance. She is seen again in the second and third seasons of Mirzapur.

== Filmography ==
=== Films ===
Year	Title	Role	Language	Notes	Ref.
2018	Aman	Neha	Hindi		
2019	Falaknuma Das	Sakhi	Telugu		
2019	Kanpuriye	Bulbul Tiwari	Hindi	Hotstar Specials	
2022	Akasha Veedullo		Telugu	Special Appearance	
2026	Mirzapur: The Movie	Divya “Dimpy” Pandit	Hindi		

=== Television ===
Year	Title	Role	Notes	Ref.
2013	Nadaniyaan	Naina	Episode 6	
2013–2016	Sadda Haq	Sanyukta Aggarwal Shekhawat		
2014–2016	Box Cricket League	Contestant	2 seasons	

=== Web series ===
Year	Title	Role	Notes	Ref.
2017	Black Coffee	Hemal		
2018–present	Mirzapur	Divya "Dimpy" Pandit	3 seasons	
2019	Sacred Games	Mary Mascarenas	Season 2	
2019	Bribe	Padma Devi		
2019–2021	Puncch Beat	Divyanka Tripathi	2 seasons	
2021	Love, Raddi	Sara Malick	Hindi	Short film
2020	Happily Ever After	Avni Mehndiratta Bagchi		
2023	Jehanabad - Of Love & War	Kasturi Mishra		
2024	Aukaat Se Zyada	Sanjana Verma	Special appearance	
2025	Agra Affair	Tanvi Sachdeva	Season 1	
2026	Waiting Hai	Princy		

=== Music videos ===
Year	Title	Singer	Ref.
2019	Rehne Do Zara	Madhubanti Bagchi	
2020	Yeh Dil	Rochak Kohli	
