= Mirzapur Union =

Mirzapur Union may refer to the following union councils of Bangladesh:

- Mirzapur Union, Gopalpur, Tangail District, Dhaka Division
- Mirzapur Union, Atwari, Panchagarh District, Rangpur Division
- Mirzapur Union, Shailkupa, Jhenaidah District, Khulna Division
- Mirzapur Union (Sreemangal), Moulvibazar District, Sylhet Division
