= Karan Anshuman =

Indian filmmaker (born 1980)

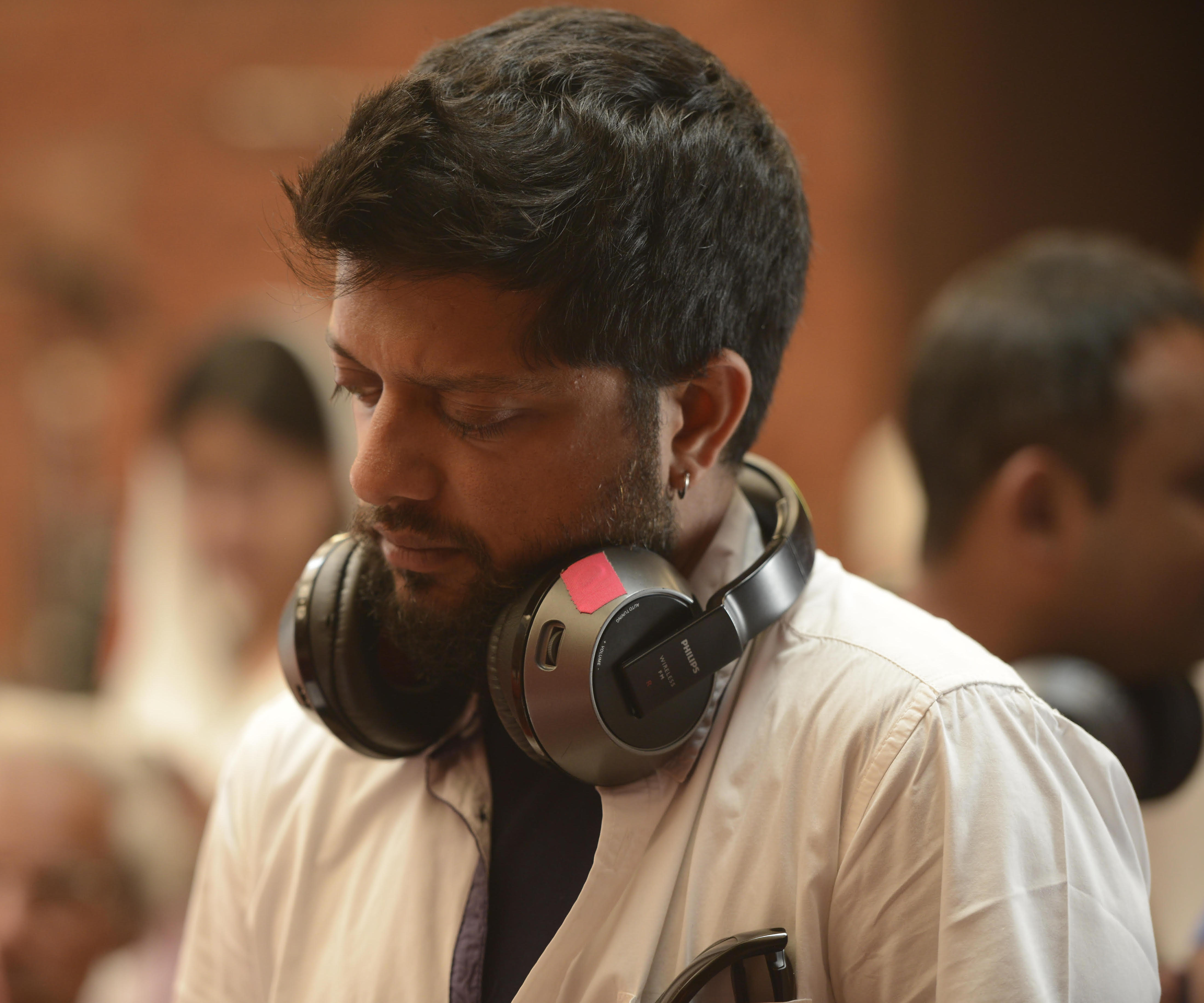
- Born: Mumbai
- Occupations: Writer; Director; Producer
- Known for: Inside Edge; Mirzapur
- Awards: ITA Award for Best Director – Web Series

Karan Anshuman (born 1980) is an Indian film writer, director, and producer. He is the creator and director of Emmy-nominated drama film Inside Edge. He is also the director and writer of Bangistan and the creator, director, and writer of Mirzapur. He is the co-founder of two digital initiatives: Dreamscape Media, a web and mobile development agency; and Upperstall.com, an Indian cinema film portal.

== Early life ==
Anshuman was raised in Mumbai, and after finishing his schooling at Jamnabai Narsee School, he went to St Xaviers' College and then to Denison University in the United States to pursue an undergraduate degree in filmmaking.

== Career ==
Anshuman co-founded Dreamscape Media in 2004 – a digital agency in the business of creation of web and mobile apps, and online marketing and communication.

In 2011, Anshuman began his career as a film critic with Mumbai Mirror.

Anshuman made his directorial debut with Bangistan in 2015, which released across 700 screens in India. The Guardian called it a "sly suicide-bomber comedy" with "always something to chuckle at in" and that Anshuman "approaches his task with smarts and sensitivity".

His next project was Amazon Prime's first Indian web series Inside Edge. Produced by Excel Entertainment, the show aired its first season in 2017. The series became the most watched show on Amazon Prime and won him the ITA Award for Best Director – Web Series along with Best Show. The show has also been nominated for the 2018 International Emmy Award in the Best Drama category. Firstpost's review mentioned, "Kudos to Karan Anshuman (the creator and director of the series) for making some of best sequences I've seen on the small screen. Not only are they very well edited (each episode starts and ends with a bang), they are superbly shot too.

Teaming up with Excel and Amazon again, Anshuman is the showrunner for Mirzapur, a hinterland gangster drama set in the badlands of eastern Uttar Pradesh, dealing with the illegal arms trade and drug smuggling. Mirzapur released worldwide on November 16, 2018.

Anshuman made his literary debut with Kashmirnāmā, a fictionalised version of the Indo-Pak relationship and the Kashmir conundrum, which was published by Jaico Publishing House in 2017.

== Filmography ==
List of Karan Anshuman film and television credits
Year	Title	Credited As			Ref.
Year	Title	Creator	Director	Screenwriter	Ref.
2015	Bangistan	No	Yes	Yes	
2017–present	Inside Edge	Yes	Yes	Yes	
2018–present	Mirzapur	Yes	Yes	Yes	
2023–present	Rana Naidu	Yes	Yes	No	
2026	Glory	Yes	Yes	Yes	

== Awards and achievements ==
- Anshuman was named by GQ in GQ's 50 Most Influential Young Indians of 2018,
- ITA Award for Best Director – Web Series for Inside Edge (2017).
