= Mirzapur (film) =

2026 Indian film

Mirzapur: The Movie
- Theatrical release poster
- Directed by: Gurmmeet Singh
- Written by: Puneet Krishna
- Produced by: Ritesh Sidhwani; Farhan Akhtar
- Starring: Pankaj Tripathi; Ali Fazal; Divyenndu; Jitendra Kumar; Ravi Kishan
- Cinematography: Sanjay Kapoor
- Edited by: Wilson Birampuria
- Music by: Score: John Stewart Eduri; Songs: Ray; Junaid Kumar; Anand Bhaskar; Dhanda Nyoliwala
- Production companies: Excel Entertainment; Amazon MGM Studios
- Distributed by: AA Films
- Release date: 4 September 2026
- Running time: 197 minutes
- Country: India
- Language: Hindi
- Budget: est. ₹80–90 crore (Note: Quoting News18, "Some trade estimates put the film's production budget much lower, at around Rs 80–90 crore."; The Siasat Daily reported the budget to be around ₹90 crore.)
- Box office: ₹325.10 crore

Mirzapur: The Movie is a 2026 Indian Hindi-language gangster drama film directed by Gurmeet Singh and written by Puneet Krishna. Produced by Ritesh Sidhwani and Farhan Akhtar under Excel Entertainment and Amazon MGM Studios, the film stars Pankaj Tripathi, Ali Fazal, Divyenndu, Jitendra Kumar and Ravi Kishan. It acts as an interquel set during the first season of the Amazon Prime Video television series Mirzapur (2018).

The film was theatrically released on 4 September 2026 and received largely positive reviews from critics. The film became a commercial success. It is the 8th highest-grossing Indian film and 5th highest-grossing Hindi film of 2026.

== Plot ==
Babban Yadav, a druglord operating out of Jaisalmer in Rajasthan, steals a large order of opium from rival gang leader, Bhairav Singh Karnawat. Bhairav tracks Babban down but he manages to escape with the help of his right-hand man, Birju Lohar. Meanwhile, in Mirzapur, Akhandanand aka Kaleen Bhaiyya is asked by the state Chief Minister's brother, JP Yadav, to deliver funds to the party for upcoming elections. Kaleen Bhaiyya hopes to increase the distribution of drugs in the state to raise money, but local druglords are colluding with JP Yadav against him, and will not immediately increase drug supply to his gang. Kaleen Bhaiyya entrusts this task to Bablu and Guddu Pandit.

Kaleen Bhaiyya's wife, Beena, visits her former lover, Birju, and conspires with him to assassinate her husband. Meanwhile, Bablu and Guddu remain at odds with Kaleen Bhaiyya's son, Munna, who resents their involvement in the family mafia operations. Guddu also has a crush on Sweety, not knowing that Munna chases after her too. Bablu wants to strike a favourable drug deal, hoping to ask Kaleen Bhaiyya for a portion of the empire for the brothers to run independently. Babban approaches their gang with an offer to sell opium, and Bablu secures a heavily discounted rate from him for their first purchase. In return, Babban asks that Kaleen Bhaiyya personally finalize the deal with him in Jaisalmer. He plans to murder Kaleen Bhaiyya in the desert by removing him from his stronghold of Mirzapur.

En route to meet Babban, Guddu buys some illegal steroid injections from a camel owner who races animals in local competitions. Guddu intends to use them due to his obsession with bodybuilding. Upon their arrival, Babban entertains Kaleen Bhaiyya's gang and uses the distraction to subdue his trusted bodyguard, Maqbool. Kaleen Bhaiyya is kidnapped, but Bablu manages to figure out his whereabouts. Guddu and Munna put aside their differences to rescue Kaleen Bhaiyya. A gunfight ensues between the two gangs, with Kaleen Bhaiyya's men aided by Bhairav Singh's gang. In the final fight, Bablu administers the steroids on Guddu, who succeeds in overpowering Babban. He then kills Babban on Kaleen Bhaiyya's orders, also avenging his mother who was slighted by Babban one afternoon in Mirzapur.

Kaleen Bhaiyya congratulates Bablu for the deal, but stops short of carving out an empire for the brothers. He instead wishes them to support Munna when he eventually takes over the gang. It is revealed that Babban was the cousin of JP Yadav, who receives his scissors in a box, along with party funds as promised from Kaleen Bhaiyya. In an epilogue, Birju breaks into Kaleen Bhaiyya's house to stab him, but is subdued. Before he can implicate Beena, she shoots him dead, sacrificing her lover to guarantee her own safety inside the Tripathi household.

== Cast ==
- Pankaj Tripathi as Akhandanand "Kaleen" Tripathi
- Ali Fazal as Govind "Guddu" Pandit
- Divyenndu as Phoolchand "Munna" Tripathi, Kaleen's son
- Jitendra Kumar as Vinay "Bablu" Pandit; Kumar replaces Vikrant Massey from the series
- Ravi Kishan as Babban Yadav
- Sushant Singh as Bhairav Singh Karnawat
- Abhishek Banerjee as Subodh alias "Compounder"
- Rasika Dugal as Beena Tripathi, Kaleen's wife and Munna's stepmother
- Shweta Tripathi as Gajgamani "Golu" Gupta
- Shriya Pilgaonkar as Swaragini "Sweety" Gupta, Guddu's love interest
- Harshita Gaur as Dimpy Pandit, Guddu and Bablu's younger sister
- Mohit Malik as Birju Lohar
- Sheeba Chaddha as Vasudha Pandit, Guddu, Bablu and Dimpy's mother
- Rajesh Tailang as Adv. Ramakant Pandit, Guddu, Bablu and Dimpy's father
- Kulbhushan Kharbanda as Satyanand "Bauji" Tripathi, Kaleen's father and Beena's father-in-law; Munna's grandfather
- Shaji Choudhary as Maqbool Khan
- Anjum Sharma as Sharad Shukla
- Sonal Chauhan as Mumtaz Bibi
- Anangsha Biswas as Zarina
- Satendra Soni as Chandu Puncture
- Nitin Mahesh Joshi as Raju, The Cook
- Prashansaa Sharma as Radhiya
- Priyanshu Painyuli as Robin Agarwal
- Paritosh Sand as CM Surya Pratap Yadav
- Rohit Tiwari as Chief Minister's PA
- Meghna Malik as Shakuntala Shukla
- Manu Rishi as IG Vishuddhanand Dubey
- Manuj Sharma as Chhedi Lal
- Shubhrajyoti Barat as Rati Shankar Shukla

== Production ==
=== Development ===
The film was officially announced by Amazon MGM Studios, with Gurmmeet Singh serving as director, and the script is penned by Puneet Krishna, while Excel Entertainment managed the production. The muhurat puja was held on 14 August 2025 at Excel office in Mumbai with the presence of the film's cast and crew.

=== Casting ===
In August 2025, Ravi Kishan joined the cast. In September 2025, Mohit Malik was added to the cast. In the same month, Jitendra Kumar was cast to replace Vikrant Massey, who exited the project. In October 2025, Sonal Chauhan and Anjum Sharma were added to the cast.

=== Filming ===
The script reading session was held on 15 August 2025. Principal photography began the following month in Mumbai. Later production moved to Varanasi in October 2025 for its second schedule, which was completed within the same month. The next schedule was held in Jaisalmer followed by Jodhpur. Following a short break, the team filmed a concurrent schedule in December 2025 in Rajasthan where Fazal's portions were filmed. Filming wrapped in January 2026. The film was shot extensively in multiple locations including Mumbai, Varanasi, and various parts of Rajasthan.

== Music ==
The soundtrack for Mirzapur: The Movie is the first Excel Entertainment film soundtrack to be released under the company's newly founded label, Excel Records, with distribution and licence partner Universal Music India, which had acquired a significant stake in the company the previous year, owning the publishing rights as a label partner. This also marked the end of Excel's nearly decade-long audio rights deal with Zee Music Company, which began with Baar Baar Dekho (2016).

The first song from the soundtrack, "Do Numbari", performed by Haryanvi rapper Dhanda Nyoliwala, released on 3 August 2026.

The second song, "Vaaroon Forever", is an extended recreation of the song "Vaaroon" from the series' soundtrack, which Zee Music Company holds the rights to. Like the original, it was composed by Anand Bhaskar, written by Ginny Diwan and sung by Romy, with Shreya Ghoshal contributing the female vocals.

== Release ==
=== Theatrical ===
In March 2026, Amazon Prime Video revealed its slate line-up for 2026. The film was theatrically released on 4 September 2026.

=== Certification ===
The film received an A certificate on 29 August 2026 by the Central Board of Film Certification (CBFC) after several cuts. The CBFC's Revising Committee asked the makers to mute profanity in 10 places, modify a dialogue, replace a word in the first half of the film with the word, 'kamar' (meaning 'waist'), modify a word, 'lanth' (meaning 'idiot') in the second half of the film and modify a caste reference.

The makers were also asked to reduce the intimate scenes by 50% through suitable modifications in visuals and sound. This led to 35 seconds of intimate scenes in the film being deleted by the makers. None of the violent or gory scenes were censored by the CBFC.

The runtime of the film is 197.19 minutes.

=== Legal proceedings ===
A PIL was filed before the Allahabad High Court on 3 September 2026 seeking a stay on the film's theatrical release over alleged obscenity, abusive language, excessive violence and derogatory references to Mirzapur district in Uttar Pradesh. The court declined to grant interim relief as the respondents had not been served with sufficient notice. Counsel for Excel Entertainment received the notice only on the evening before the film's scheduled release. The hearing was adjourned for four weeks and is expected to resume in October 2026.

=== Home media ===
The film's extended cut began streaming on Amazon Prime Video from 30 October 2026.

== Reception ==
=== Box office ===
Mirzapur grossed ₹324.75 crore (US$35 million) worldwide. It grossed ₹259.55 crore (US$28 million) in India and ₹65.2 crore (US$7.0 million) in overseas market.

On its opening day, the film earned ₹24.47 crore net at the domestic box office.

The film entered 100 Crore Club on 7 September 2026, collecting over ₹100 crore domestic box office net.

=== Critical response ===
On the review aggregator website Rotten Tomatoes, 80% of 20 critics' reviews are positive, with an average rating of 6.5/10.

A critic at Bollywood Hungama gave the film 4 stars out of 5, concluding, "The powerhouse performances, whistle-worthy dialogues, gripping confrontations, massy moments and a rousing finale compensate for the stretched portions and predictable nature of the narrative." Rishabh Suri of Hindustan Times also gave the film 4 stars out of 5, appreciating Singh's direction, Krishna's writing and him bringing out the 'peculiar flavour of the Mirzapur universe' world-building to the film and acting performances of the ensemble cast. He also noted in his review, "It's the fact that the makers have ensured there is enough freshness by adding subplots. The action is larger-than-life and, thankfully, has none of the AI slop that many filmmakers might resort to, to cut costs." Mayur Sanap of Rediff.com gave the film 4 stars out of 5 as well, and wrote, "Singh keeps the film on track with his assured direction. He gives the film a bigger canvas without losing the earthy flavour of the series. The pacing is mostly smooth, the action set pieces are presented well, and he keeps the focus on the characters and drama rather than letting the scale take over." Zinia Bandyopadhyay of Firstpost gave the film 3.5 stars out of 5 and wrote, "What absolutely works in its favour is the cast. The chemistry between the actors remains almost exactly what it was eight years ago, when the show first landed. Yes, the storyline is long, stretching to 190 minutes, but the arcs are interesting and, importantly, nothing is left hanging." Sana Farzeen of India Today gave the film 3 stars out of 5, writing, "The humour still lands, the action packs a punch, and the Rajasthan portions look particularly gorgeous. There is even room for romance amid all the bloodshed, giving the otherwise dark world a different shade. But here is where Mirzapur: The Movie loses its grip. The makers are so invested in preserving the show's complicated relationships, layered characters and multiple storylines that they forget one small thing: this is a film, not a 10-episode season. There is simply too much going on."

Abhishek Srivastava of The Times of India also gave the film 3 stars out of 5, concluding, "Mirzapur: The Movie loses the charm it builds in the first half, and whatever charm survives fades fast after the interval. Its grip on the setting is shaky, but the cast keeps things watchable even when the story doesn't. The film touches on political corruption involving the chief minister's brother without ever really digging into how ugly that world gets. At 197 minutes, it overstays its welcome, and chopping thirty minutes of its runtime would have helped a lot." Sneha Hiro Tare of News18 gave the film 3 stars out of 5 as well and observed, "The set pieces, however, lack the real scale and impact you hope for on the big screen. The story itself stays thin and the film runs long. Some stretches drag and the pacing dips in the middle before the last half-hour picks up again. It is the towering background score that makes up for the technical limitations." Shubhra Gupta of The Indian Express, too, gave the film 3 stars out of 5 and concluded in her review, "Net net, I quite enjoyed Mirzapur The Movie because it knows how to stay in its lane, papering over its flabby bits with continual speedy spurts and an intriguing climax." Rahul Desai of The Hollywood Reporter India wrote, "But the movie comes into its own only as a tribute to itself: when Munna is being the OG heir yearning for papa's love before Ranbir Kapoor in Animal; when the colourful language (the b-words and c-words) makes a hero-style comeback on the right lips; and when misogynistic gangsters face off against moral gangsters". Saibal Chatterjee of NDTV gave the film 2.5 stars out of 5, summing up in his review, "A Mirzapur movie franchise might not be such a bad idea provided the makers find enough narrative meat to pad it with."
