= Mirzapur (TV series) =

Indian television series

- Genre: Crime; Thriller; Action
- Created by: Karan Anshuman; Puneet Krishna
- Written by: Puneet Krishna; Vineet Krishna; Karan Anshuman; Apurva Dhar Badgaiyan; Avinash Singh
- Directed by: Gurmeet Singh; Karan Anshuman; Mihir Desai; Anand Iyer
- Starring: see cast section
- Music by: Anand Bhaskar
- Opening theme: Mirzapur Theme Song (seasons 1–2); Mirzapur Reprise (Season 3)
- Composer: John Stewart Eduri
- Country of origin: India
- Original language: Hindi
- No. of seasons: 3
- No. of episodes: 29

Production
- Executive producers: Ritesh Sidhwani; Farhan Akhtar; Kassim Jagmagia; Aditya mohanty
- Cinematography: Sanjay Kapoor
- Editors: Siddheshwar Ekambe; Manan Ashwin Mehta; Anshul Gupta
- Running time: 38–65 minutes
- Production company: Excel Entertainment

Original release
- Network: Amazon Video
- Release: 16 November 2018 – present

Related
- Mirzapur (2026); Mirzapur film soundtrack

Mirzapur is an Indian action gangster drama streaming television series created for Amazon Prime Video, by Karan Anshuman, who wrote the script along with Puneet Krishna and Vineet Krishna. Anshuman directed the first season of the series, along with Gurmeet Singh and Mihir Desai, the latter of whom directed the second season and third season along with Anand Iyer. The series is produced by Ritesh Sidhwani and Farhan Akhtar of Excel Entertainment. The story follows Akhandanand “Kaleen” Tripathi, a crime boss and businessman who is the proverbial ruler of Mirzapur district in the Purvanchal region of Uttar Pradesh state in India.

In the first season, the main cast features Pankaj Tripathi, Ali Fazal, Divyendu Sharma, Vikrant Massey, Shweta Tripathi, Shriya Pilgaonkar, Rasika Dugal, Harshita Gaur and Kulbhushan Kharbanda. The second season retains the principal cast from the first season, excluding Massey and Pilgaonkar, with new cast consisting of Vijay Varma, Isha Talwar, Lilliput, Anjum Sharma, Priyanshu Painyuli, Anangsha Biswas and Neha Sargam.

The series was filmed mostly across Uttar Pradesh, primarily shot in Mirzapur, and other locations including Jaunpur, Azamgarh, Ghazipur, Lucknow, Raebareli, Gorakhpur, and Varanasi. Sanjay Kapoor served as the cinematographer, with Manan Mehta and Anshul Gupta edited the series. John Stewart Eduri composed the background score.

The first season of Mirzapur was released on 16 November 2018. The series opened to positive response from audiences, while critics gave mixed reviews. The performances of the cast members, particularly Pankaj Tripathi and Ali Fazal received rave response. It eventually became the most popular streaming series in India, after Sacred Games. The second season of Mirzapur was released on 23 October 2020. The third season of the show was released on 5 July 2024. The first two seasons were received positively, however the third season received mixed reactions from the audience.

== Premise ==
The iron-fisted Akhandanand Tripathi is a millionaire carpet exporter and the crime boss of Mirzapur. His son Munna is an unworthy, power-hungry heir who will stop at nothing to inherit his father's legacy. An incident at a wedding procession forces him to cross paths with Ramakant Pandit, an upstanding lawyer, and his sons Guddu and Bablu. It snowballs into a game of ambition, power and greed that threatens the fabric of this lawless city.

== Cast ==
=== Overview ===
Character	Portrayed by	Season 1 (2018)	Season 2 (2020)	Season 3 (2024)
Akhandanand "kaleen" Tripathi	Pankaj Tripathi	Main	Main	Main
Govind "Guddu" Pandit	Ali Fazal	Main	Main	Main
Phoolchand "Munna" Tripathi	Divyendu Sharma	Main	Main	Guest
Vinay "Bablu" Pandit	Vikrant Massey	Main	Guest	
Beena Tripathi	Rasika Dugal	Main	Main	Main
Gajgamini "Golu" Gupta	Shweta Tripathi	Main	Main	Main
Satyanand "Bauji" Tripathi	Kulbhushan Kharbanda	Main	Main	
Swaragini "Sweety" Gupta	Shriya Pilgaonkar	Main	Guest	
Devdatt "Dadda" Tyagi	Lilliput		Main	Main
Shatrughan “Shatru” Tyagi	Vijay Varma (dual role)		Main	Main
Bharat Tyagi	Vijay Varma (dual role)		Main	
Madhuri Yadav	Isha Talwar		Main	Main
Sharad Shukla	Anjum Sharma	Recurring	Main	Main
SSP Ram Sharan Maurya	Amit Sial	Main	Main	
Shabnam Lala	Shernavaz Jijina	Recurring	Recurring	Main
Shakuntala Shukla	Meghna Malik		Guest	Main
Lala	Anil George	Guest	Main	Main

=== Recurring ===
- Harshita Gaur as Dimpy Pandit (season 1–3)
- Rajesh Tailang as Ramakant Pandit (seasons 1−3)
- Sheeba Chaddha as Vasudha Pandit (season 1–3)
- Priyanshu Painyuli as Radheshyam 'Robin' Agarwal (seasons 2–3)
- Shaji Choudhary as Maqbool Khan (season 1–2)
- Aasif Khan as Babar Khan (seasons 1–2)
- Abhishek Banerjee as Subodh aka Compounder (season 1)
- Brahma Mishra as Lalit Burma aka Lodu Lalit (seasons 1–2)
- Shahnawaz Pradhan as SP Parshuram Gupta (seasons 1–3)
- Avanish Pandey as Intelligence officer (IPS) (Season 3)
- Pramod Pathak as Jai Prakash "J.P." Yadav (season 1–3)
- Shubrajyoti Barat as Rati Shankar Shukla (season 1)
- Anjum Sharma as Sharad Shukla (seasons 1–3)
- Anil George as Rauf Hakim Lala (seasons 1–3)
- Akash Singh Rajput as Daara Shikhov (season 1)
- Shernavaz Jijina as Shabnam Lala (season 1)
- Manu Rishi as IG Vishudanand Dubey (season 1)
- Prashansa Sharma as Radhiya (season 1)
- Anangsha Biswas as Zarina (season 1-2)
- Priyasha Bhardwaj as Jamuna Maurya (season 2)
- Hemant Kapadia as Imran Alam (seasons 1–2)
- Nitin Mahesh Joshi as Raja (season 1–2)
- Paritosh Sand as Chief Minister (CM) Surya Pratap Yadav, CM of Uttar Pradesh (season 2)
- Meghna Malik as Shakuntala Shukla (season 2)
- Shrikant Verma as Mamaji (season 2)
- Alka Amin as Geeta Tyagi (season 2)
- Neha Sargam as Saloni Bharat Tyagi (season 2)
- Santosh Bhokare as Police Officer Pandey
- Mukesh Bhatt as Haseena
- Dibyendu Bhattacharya as Doctor (season 2)
- Rohit Tiwari as PA Anand (season 2)
- Ali Quli Mirza as Sheku Bhai (season 2)
- Amika Shail as Bar Singer (season 2)
- Salim Siddiqui as Lambardar (season 3)
- Azher Qurushi as Valmiki (season 3)
- Jeetu Shastri as Usman Miyan

== Episodes ==
=== Series overview ===
Series	Episodes	Originally released	
Series	Episodes	First released	Last released
1	9	16 November 2018	16 November 2018
2	10	23 October 2020	23 October 2020
3	10	5 July 2024	5 July 2024

=== Season 1 (2018) ===
No. overall	No. in series	Title	Directed by	Written by	Original release date
1	1	"Jhandu"	Karan Anshuman and Gurmeet Singh	Devdut Halder, and Karan Anshuman	15 November 2018
The episode starts with a man stating, "Kaleen Bhaiyya, King of Mirzapur. If that's the case, then that makes me the Prince of Mirzapur". He was Phoolchand Tripathi, popular by the name of Munna Bhaiyya. His father Akhandanand Tripathi AKA Kaleen Bhaiya, the uncrowned king of Mirzapur, runs a drugs and arms business, under the guise of a carpet (known as Kaleen in Hindi) manufacturing company named after the family Tripathi Carpet Company. Hence, the name Kaleen Bhaiyya. One night, Munna accidentally kills a groom with celebratory gunfire while dancing at his wedding. Akhandanand has a much younger wife, Beena Tripathi, who he continually fails to satisfy in bed. The family of the dead groom hires Ramakant Pandit, a fearless and idealist lawyer. Ramakant has 2 sons and a daughter; Guddu, Bablu and Dimpy, who study in the same college as Munna. Guddu has a crush on Dimpy's close friend Sweety which Munna also lusts for, but is too scared to ask her out. SP Parshuram, Sweety's father and Akhanda's messenger, informs him that his old rival Rati Shankar might be returning to Mirzapur and also about Munna's blunder. Akhanda tells his son to clean up his own mess. Munna goes to the Ramakant's house to threaten him into rejecting the case. When Ramakant refuses to comply, Munna pulls a gun on him which leads to a scuffle in which Ramakant and his family manage to subdue Munna and his goons. Akhanda decides to step in and he summons Ramakant's sons, who are dreading what the kingpin has in store for them.
2	2	"Gooda"	Gurmeet Singh and Mihir Desai	Puneet Krishna, Vineet Krishna, and Karan Anshuman	16 November 2018
Akhanda is impressed by the fact that the Pandit brothers thrashed Munna despite knowing that he is his son. He decides to offer them a job, shocking the brothers and Munna. After much pondering, they agree to work for Akhanda, leaving Munna furious. They are given a bike and a pair of pistols and are also told to talk their father into declining the case; Pandit refuses. Sweety has a nerdy sister, Gajagamini "Golu" Gupta, who is close to Bablu and they like each other. Guddu and Bablu force the dead groom's father to withdraw the case. An assassin sent by Rati Shankar fails to kill Munna. Rati's son, Sharad, suggests his father to take his revenge on 'neutral ground'.
3	3	"Wafadar"	Gurmeet Singh	Puneet Krishna, Vineet Krishna, and Karan Anshuman Episode 10: Harmonious Ending	16 November 2018
A generation-old rivalry between Akhandanand, his father Satyanand (Bauji), and Rati Shankar is rekindled. Sharad refuses to join his father Rati Shankar's business. J.P. Yadav demands election funds from Akhanda; he meets his supplier, Lala, to ask for an extra supply of resham (opium). On the way back, he is ambushed by Rati Shankar's assassins. He captures two of them, who reveal that Rati Shankar is targeting his family. Akhanda gives control of his gun ring to Guddu and Bablu asking them to expand it. Akhanda's wife, Beena, has sex with someone other than Tripathi.
4	4	"Virginity"	Gurmeet Singh and Karan Anshuman	Puneet Krishna, Vineet Krishna, and Karan Anshuman	16 November 2018
Beena has sex with the house servant, Raja. Frustrated due to Munna's violent nature, the principal of the college asks Golu to compete against him in the upcoming college elections. After refusing Munna's approaches, Sweety asks Guddu out on a date. Munna gets Guddu steroids for bodybuilding through Compounder, a loyal aide to Munna. After Munna expresses that he wishes to take over Mirzapur as soon as his father lets him, Compounder offers to kill Akhanda; Munna considers it. The Pandit brothers kill for the first time (a reference to the title).
5	5	"Bhaukaal"	Karan Anshuman and Mihir Desai	Puneet Krishna, Vineet Krishna, and Karan Anshuman	16 November 2018
Munna takes a cut in an opium deal without his father's consent. Guddu and Bablu hatch an ambitious plan to increase the gun trade, but for this, both the cops and criminals of Mirzapur must cooperate. Guddu reveals to Sweety that he is a gangster working for Akhanda. Ramakant writes frequent letters to the Chief Minister regarding the matters at Mirzapur, but to no avail. Guddu and Bablu sell drugs through eunuchs. Violence in the city shoots up and the gun sales also increase impressing Akhandanand; he decides to involve the brothers in his carpet business. The state capital sends SSP Ram Sharan Maurya to Mirzapur to control the violence.
6	6	"Barfi"	Gurmeet Singh and Mihir Desai	Puneet Krishna, Vineet Krishna, and Karan Anshuman	16 November 2018
A meet-up of the mafia heads of Purvanchal (Akhandanand Tripathi, Rati Shankar Shukla, and others) and their political patron (J.P. Yadav) masquerading as a Holi party ends up in a fracas which threatens to transform all equations. J.P. Yadav, feeling insulted at the hands of Akhanda and Munna, offers to help Rati Shankar gain control of Mirzapur if he can provide him with funds for elections. A truce is established between Akhandanand and Rati Shankar.
7	7	"Lions of Mirzapur"	Gurmeet Singh and Karan Anshuman	Puneet Krishna, Vineet Krishna, and Karan Anshuman	16 November 2018
Maurya's special team, composed of honest officers, ambush the Pandit brothers, who manage to escape. Akhanda instructs both of them to go underground for a while. Acting on the agreed plan, Compounder attempts to kill Akhanda at his home using a razor blade, but fails when Bauji intervenes. When Akhanda confronts Munna, he forcefully kills Compounder.
8	8	"Tandav"	Gurmeet Singh	Puneet Krishna, Vineet Krishna, and Karan Anshuman	16 November 2018
Guddu and Bablu go to Jaunpur to meet a buyer, who is revealed to be Rati Shankar. He asks them to join him in ruling Mirzapur; Guddu shoots him in the head. Akhanda is left fuming after learning this, and that the boys did not consult him before shooting. Meanwhile, Guddu marries Sweety, and the next day, participates in a bodybuilding contest. The eunuchs are caught, and are arrested by Maurya. Munna tries to frame Guddu and Bablu for the attack on his father. Akhanda thus causes Guddu to lose the contest; Guddu wreaks havoc on stage. Later, Akhanda hands over a gun to Munna, ordering him to eliminate Guddu and Bablu.
9	9	"Yogya"	Gurmeet Singh	Puneet Krishna, Vineet Krishna, and Karan Anshuman	16 November 2018
Golu wins the college elections, much to Munna's disappointment. Guddu, Bablu, Dimpy, Sweety and Golu travel to Gorakhpur for Dimpy's friend Shabnam's wedding, who turns out to be Lala's daughter. Munna, on the pretext of wanting to congratulate Golu, goes to Gorakhpur along with his goons. Sweety reveals that she is pregnant to cheer Guddu up, who is still depressed for losing the contest. On the other hand, police beat up the eunuchs to disclose who the brothers work for; Parshuram informs Akhanda.Guddu goes to the washroom and he washes his face coming to terms with the fact he is going to be a father, in the excitement he even mimics carrying a baby. Bauji learns of Beena and Raja's affair and forces Beena to have sex with him and cut off Raja's genitals, by holding a gun against her. Munna enters the venue thanks to his contact, and decides to assess the situation. Munna sees Dimpy on the stage and holds her in gunpoint, alerting the attendees. Bablu hides with Sweety and Golu, after which Guddu comes out of the washroom and starts attacking Munna's men. Sweety and Bablu are gunned down shortly. Sweety reveals she is pregnant and Guddu begs Munna not to do anything,as Munna shoots her twice in the stomach anyways. Sweety suffocates due to the impact and slowly dies. A helpless Guddu watches the chances of him becoming a father are very much over. Munna then proceeds to shoot Bablu, as the horrified Guddu watches. After Lala's men cause a shootout, guests flee from the wedding, including Golu, Guddu and Dimpy. Akhanda has Maurya and his team abducted, and kills their last member in front of Maurya to remind him of his place. In the mid credits scene, Sharad is shown shaving his head and decides to carry his father's legacy.

=== Season 2 (2020) ===
No. overall	No. in series	Title	Directed by	Written by	Original release date
10	1	"Dhenkul"	Mihir Desai and Gurmeet Singh	Puneet Krishna and Vineet Krishna	23 October 2020
Munna is recovering from bullet wounds after the wedding shootout. Chief Minister SP Yadav reprimands his brother JP Yadav for the wedding massacre. Dimpy, Golu, and a crippled Guddu, have gone hiding in a guesthouse in the forest. After Dimpy and Golu are seen stealing guns, a policeman and his aide barge into the guesthouse; Golu stabs the policeman to death. JP Yadav wants to punish Munna for the wedding massacre by putting him behind bars and asks Akhanda to hand him over. Shaken by Sweety's death, Parshuram ask Maurya for help, but Maurya says that he has lost his courage. With growing lust, Bauji eagerly waits for an unwell Beena to recover. Lala bides his time with Yusuf, and urges him to take revenge against Munna. Sharad becomes the Don of Jaunpur, worrying Akhanda.
11	2	"Khargosh"	Gurmeet Singh	Puneet Krishna and Vineet Krishna	23 October 2020
Dimpy, Guddu and Golu are helped by an ambulance driver and go to Baliya. Later, Babar, Maqbool's nephew, helps them get supplies for guns and ammunition; Golu learns to shoot for the first time. Not wanting to deal with JP Yadav anymore, Akhanda makes a scapegoat of Munna's aid, Lalit, for the killings in the wedding. Munna gatecrashes Rati Shankar's prayer ceremony and asks Sharad to hand over Jaunpur. Sharad declares that the old enmity is over, and they start a new relationship where he swears loyalty to Munna by killing Yusuf. Golu, Guddu, and Dimpy visit their families in Mirzapur. Akhanda puts Maurya on his payroll to allow the uncontrolled flow of his guns.
12	3	"Viklaang Quota"	Mihir Desai	Puneet Krishna and Vineet Krishna	23 October 2020
Akhanda consults a sexologist about his issues in bed and undergoes a sperm count test. Guddu pairs up with Lala, as he promises profit to Lala's trade in return for his help. Guddu gets the distributors to sell opium without informing Akhanda, thereby cutting him off. Beena announces her pregnancy, much to Akhanda and Bauji's delight. As Guddu and Golu are seeing Dimpy off to Lucknow in a hostel, Guddu meets Robin, and decides to invest his money. Munna arranges an attack at Lala's, but it goes awry as Guddu and Golu overpower them, with Guddu sending back one of the attacker's teeth with his "resignation" letter to the Tripathis. The sexologist visits the Tripathis and gives Akhanda's report, which indicates that he has a low sperm count, to Beena. Ramakant, in vain, seeks a witness from the wedding to testify against Munna.
13	4	"Bhaymukt"	Gurmeet Singh	Puneet Krishna and Vineet Krishna	23 October 2020
For the first time, Golu and Guddu grieve over the death of their family. Beena manipulates Bauji into rehiring Radhiya as a servant. Munna begins the rallies with the widowed daughter of the Chief Minister, Madhuri, for a crime-free (Bhaymukt) Purvanchal. The pair later form a bond. Beena informs Raja that the child is actually his. She gets him to murder the sexologist and tears up the report. Golu comes across Shatrughan Tyagi while investing money in Robin's office. Akhanda learns of Guddu's opium distribution, and a meeting with the distributors is called; Sharad convinces Akhanda to take a cut of the profits from the distributors instead of the usual middleman cut. Strengthening their family ties, Sharad and Munna share a bottle of wine, and decide to kill Guddu together. Sharad, posing as a buyer, sets up a meeting with Guddu which results in a bar room brawl between Sharad, Munna, and Guddu. Sharad and Munna escape after causing a roof to collapse on Guddu; he survives.
14	5	"Langda"	Mihir Desai	Puneet Krishna and Vineet Krishna	23 October 2020
Akhanda is furious at Munna and Sharad for pursuing Guddu. Munna informs his father and Maqbool that Babar is working for Guddu. Munna connects the Tripathis with the Tyagi family. Beena visits her maternal home, but secretly meets Guddu and Golu; the three begin to work together to bring the Tripathis down. The Tyagis, consisting of Devdatt Tyagi a.k.a. "Dadda", father of twins, Bharat and Shatrughan, are dealers of alcohol and stolen motors in Siwan, Bihar. Meanwhile, Munna hooks up with Madhuri despite his father's warning to be appropriate with her. Golu learns about the Tripathi family's internal issues from Bablu's diary, which are later confirmed by Beena. Guddu makes a name for himself by trashing a local criminal. Shabnam goes on a long drive with Guddu, thereby developing feelings for him. Maqbool confronts Babar on his betrayal. Beena informs Guddu and Golu that the Tripathis and most of their security are away at the final election rally; Guddu and Golu enter Mirzapur under the cover of darkness.
15	6	"Ankush"	Gurmeet Singh	Puneet Krishna and Vineet Krishna	23 October 2020
Guddu and Golu destroy Tripathi's gun factory. Akhanda turns the destroyed factory into a selling point for the Chief Minister's crime-free campaign. Robin tries to get closer to Dimpy. On learning about Munna's affair, Akhanda and Bauji convince him to marry Madhuri. Ramakant finally finds a witness to the wedding massacre; Imran Alam, and unbeknownst to him, an ally in SSP Maurya; he's close to the Tripathis only for his and his family's safety. Raja, under the order of Beena, finds Babar tied up at Maqbool's house and sets him free. Guddu plans to obtain the government allotted poppy fields to have an independent supply of opium, and seeks help of JP Yadav, who feels sidelined by his Chief Minister brother. Munna and Madhuri marry in court; on the wedding night, Munna tells Madhuri that he does not have feelings for her. Chief Minister SP Yadav wins the elections, and appoints Akhandanand as the Commerce and Industry minister, to which JP objects. Guddu and Golu meet with the Tyagi family for a deal, but Dadda and Bharat refuse to deal in drugs.
16	7	"Ood Bilaav"	Gurmeet Singh	Puneet Krishna and Vineet Krishna	23 October 2020
Guddu and Golu convince Shatrughan to secretly sell opium in Siwan. Whereas Sharad and Munna finalize the gun deal with Bharat. Guddu recruits a few local thugs, much to their boss, Sheku the barber's displeasure; Sheku warns Guddu that he will regret it, but Guddu claims that 'he has nothing to lose'. Sharad and JP plan a coup. Dadda learns about opium in his town and tries to figure out the culprit. Shabnam and Guddu look to move on from their losses. Robin and Dimpy grow closer and so do Golu and Shatrughan. Guddu arrives at his doctor's daughter Lippi's birthday party, only to discover that the doctor and his wife have been murdered; a vengeful Sheku kills them to prove Guddu wrong. On the other hand, while returning from his office, Chief Minister's car is rammed side-on by a truck, leading to his death.
17	8	"Chauchak"	Mihir Desai	Puneet Krishna and Vineet Krishna	23 October 2020
After SP Yadav's death, JP becomes the new Chief Minister-elect and waits for swearing-in. Munna sympathizes with Madhuri and promises to change himself. Maurya figures out Sharad's involvement in the CM's death and tries to blackmail him, but fails. The PA of SP Yadav, Anand, tells Madhuri about JP's likely involvement in her father's death; she and Akhanda plan to take down JP. JP gives the police green signal to take down Munna. Maurya and Ramakant protect Alam. Robin confesses his love to Dimpy. Guddu and Golu plan, with Beena, to take Mirzapur once Munna is arrested. JP's night of debauchery with his PA Zarina and a few widows leads to him facing sexual assault allegations.
18	9	"Butterscotch"	Mihir Desai	Puneet Krishna and Vineet Krishna	23 October 2020
Beena gives birth to a boy and is worried about his safety. Zarina and Kaleen bhaiya had pre-planned the downfall of JP along with certain conditions. Madhuri enrolls herself for the seat, and is elected unopposed as the Chief Minister, which leaves Akhanda stunned and disappointed. Lala is unhappy with Guddu's closeness to Shabnam. After seeing Guddu and Shabnam in an intimate moment, an enraged Golu calls Shatrughan to have sex with him. Munna gets rid of Alam. Maurya is frustrated with constant setbacks and decides to meet with the Inspector General. Robin meets Ramakant who welcomes him as his son-in-law, in exchange for information on Guddu's dealings, unbeknownst to Dimpy. Munna discovers that Babar is alive, and kills him at his house, also killing Maqbool's mother in the process. Akhanda and Bauji confront Maqbool at his mother's funeral, and Bauji claims that they 'took back what was theirs'. Next morning, Maqbool walks into the Tripathi manor with his sub-machine gun in his hand.
19	10	"King of Mirzapur"	Gurmeet Singh	Puneet Krishna and Vineet Krishna	23 October 2020
Maqbool prepares to kill Bauji and holds him at gunpoint. Beena intervenes, and with the help of the housemaid, seeks the opportunity to exact her revenge by brutally chopping Bauji to death. At Bauji's funeral, Munna lashes out at his father and vows to dethrone him and rule Mirzapur. Fearing for her baby's life, Beena asks Raja to protect him from Munna, no matter the cost. Bharat learns about his brother's involvement with Golu and the opium trade, which also includes his uncle (Mama). The meeting with Dadda, Mama, and Shatrughan ends in a bloodbath, killing Mama and Shatrughan. Maurya and Ramakant arrest Guddu at Lala's manor, but Maurya intends to encounter a defenseless Guddu. Ramakant has no choice but to shoot Maurya and confront his own beliefs. Raja attacks Munna, but Munna dodges and kills Raja after he falsely reveals that it was Akhandanand who asked to kill him. Munna informs Sharad of this and plans to kill his father. Sharad looks to bring his own plan to a conclusion and goes to the cremation ground. Guddu and Golu also join Munna and Sharad in the fray for the Throne of Mirzapur. Munna confronts Akhanda at the cremation ground, but decides against killing him. Akhanda declares Munna the King of Mirzapur, and they embrace, but are immediately attacked by Guddu and Golu, severely injuring them, while Sharad watches. Finally, Guddu has his revenge by shooting Munna dead in the same manner he killed Bablu and Sweety. Sharad's men join the commotion, and Sharad escapes with a critical Akhanda. In the post-credits, Shatrughan turns out to be alive; he had posed as his dead twin. At long last, Guddu sits on the Throne of Mirzapur.

=== Season 3 (2024) ===
No. overall	No. in series	Title	Directed by	Written by	Original release date
20	1	"Tetua"	Gurmmeet Singh	Apurva Dhar Badgaiyan	5 July 2024
Ramakant is on trial for the killing of SSP Maurya and refuses any help from Guddu, choosing to face punishment unlike the latter. Golu is on the hunt for Akhandanand Tripathi or his body but is unsuccessful. After cremating Munna, Madhuri vows to fulfill her father's mission of a crime-free state. Sharad is rallying the dons of Uttar Pradesh in order to stake a claim to the throne of Purvanchal. At the meeting of the dons, Sharad and Guddu are named the top contenders for the throne, and Munnawar, the convener of the meeting from the West asks them to strengthen their claim till Dussehra in a non violent manner. Golu figures out that Sharad had hidden Akhanda. Sharad travels to Siwan, Bihar, where a comatose Akhanda is being treated under the Tyagis' watch and asks the doctors to hurry.
21	2	"Mexico"	Gurmmeet Singh and Anand Iyer	Avinash Singh Tomar	5 July 2024
In Mirzapur, the power struggle intensifies. Sharad believes that aligning with Akhanda is crucial for his ascent. He plans to eliminate Guddu along with Golu, who Dadda blames for his son's death. IG Dubey sends his encounter specialist, Valmiki, and his team to assassinate Guddu. After a few days of surveillance, Valmiki figures out the best way to get Guddu is via the Mr Purvanchal bodybuilding contest. Guddu agrees to attend the contest, the public appearance meant to establish his dominance. Meanwhile, CM Madhuri Yadav faces opposition within her cabinet, especially from Solanki, who doubts her leadership. At the bodybuilding contest, Guddu is ambushed by Valmiki and his men but manages to overpower and defeat them all. He also uses Valmiki's gun to shoot dead the other guest, Bhojpuri film star Suttan Jha, to further create problems for the administration; Madhuri Yadav faces public backlash and IG Dubey grapples with the consequences of the failed operation. Akhandanand Tripathi wakes up from his coma as Guddu destroys the Tripathi family statues in Tripathi chowk.
22	3	"Pratishodh"	Gurmmeet Singh	Avinash Singh, and Vijay Narayan Verma	5 July 2024
Guddu cements his power over Mirzapur while Sharad finally makes a strong ally. Golu receives a threat from Bharat. Ramakant turns down Robin's offer and faces danger in prison. Meanwhile Madhuri strategises to topple Guddu in other ways.
23	4	"Kekadaa"	Gurmmeet Singh	Avinash Singh Tomar	5 July 2024
Ramakant's case is in danger with the appearance of a new witness. In an attempt to save her father's opium business from collapsing, Shabnam turns to Guddu for help. Meanwhile Golu gets much awaited information about the still missing Kaleen Bhaiya.
24	5	"Traahi"	Gurmmeet Singh	Avinash Singh, and Vijay Narayan Verma	5 July 2024
Golu plans an attack outside Mirzapur without Guddu. Her team is killed and she is captured by Bharat Tyagi and taken to a secret location. Golu realises that Bharat is actually Shatrughan who has taken his brother's place. Guddu returns from Nepal to find Golu missing. Sharad senses something is amiss in Siwan and decides to shift his most guarded secret to Jaunpur.
25	6	"Bhasmasur"	Anand Iyer	Avinash Singh Tomar	5 July 2024
Purvanchal is set ablaze with a gang war between Sharad and Guddu. Madhuri makes strong decisions to break the police-gangster nexus, while a ghost from the past resurfaces. Ramakant finds a purpose in prison, which catches Lala's attention.
26	7	"Bum-pilaat"	Gurmmeet Singh	Avinash Singh, and Vijay Narayan Verma	5 July 2024
Sharad has Lala attacked and killed in jail for ditching his offer and dealing with Guddu. Purvanchal is thrown into turmoil following the shocking incident in the jail. Dadda confronts his son, while Sharad and Bharat have a fallout as well over Bharat keeping secret about Golu from him. A baithak is called by Sharad on Akhanda's advice to resolve the gang feud, which concludes with Sharad gaining majority support over Guddu. Golu pushes Chote to shoot at her. Meanwhile Beena contacts Madhuri and Sharad asking them to rescue her.
27	8	"Raja Beta"	Gurmmeet Singh	Avinash Singh Tomar	5 July 2024
A disfigured dead body is found, the police believing it's Golu. Guddu goes down a dark downward spiral as he loses people close to him. Madhuri offers Guddu to free Beena and his son in exchange of her preventing Ramakant from getting a death penalty, Guddu denies. A new judge is assigned before Ramakant's final hearing. IG Dubey is reinstated and is tasked with one mission: Capturing Guddu Pandit. Guddu attends the hearing planning to sabotage it and rescue Ramakant, as the police has already planned. Robin intervenes just before the death sentence is announced, making a claim that adjourns the proceeding. Sharad, opportunistically decides to take responsibility for Golu's killing, before the Tiyagi's could blame it on him, in order to provoke Guddu. Meanwhile, Saloni is suspicious of Bharat's behavior. She secretly follows him and finds him visiting Golu, who is alive and still held captive. Golu exposes Chote's secret to Saloni, who gets locked with Golu by Chote. Robin is accidentally killed by Guddu in a fit of rage after he reveals Golu met him before she disappeared.
28	9	"Ansh"	Gurmmeet Singh and Anand Iyer	Avinash Singh, and Vijay Narayan Verma	5 July 2024
Guddu is in shock and grief over Robin's murder and surrenders. Beena and her son are moved to CM house. Beena is compelled to find safety after the fall of Guddu. Golu warns Saloni that Chote will kill her since she now know that Golu is alive. Madhuri urges Sharad to let go of the past for a better future and they get close romantically. Chote visits the two captives with the intent of killing Golu, now completely impersonating Bharat. He gives Saloni way to escape but Golu injures her and escapes instead. Bharat shoots at her, injuring her, but prioritizes saving Saloni first. Dimpy demands Ramakant share the evidence he has and discovers that Sharad Shukla was behind the CM's assassination.
29	10	"Pratibimbh"	Gurmmeet Singh and Anand Iyer	Apurva Dhar Badgaiyan	5 July 2024
Golu returns to Mirzapur only to discover the chaos that ensued in her absence, including her father's suicide and Guddu's arrest. She calls Satya to fix a meeting with JP Yadav. JP tried to buy Zarina's services but she double crosses him taking the MLA's to Sharad who threatens them to keep their support with Madhuri. Dimpy meets with Madhuri and her PA and shares the evidence telling her that "criminals are only criminals and not family". A shattered Madhuri coolly asks Sharad to setup a private meeting with Akhandanand. Beena demands Madhuri the throne of Mirzapur and her support, calling it Lalla's inheritence and Lalla its rightful heir. Golu meets with JP and wins his support for Guddu. JP and Golu then persuade Solanki to help free Guddu in exchange of funds and support to topple Madhuri's government, supported by Sharad. Akhandanand asks Sharad to call the baithak and meets with Madhuri. Madhuri tells him that he has always done the right thing despite the promises he made. At the final baithak to decide who will control the East, Munnawar proposes that the West control the East and leave the throne empty. Akhandanand steps in and proposes that Sharad take the throne, fulfilling his promise to him. As Sharad steps forward, Akhandanand fatally shoots him and the guards, following Madhuri's plan. IG Dubey storms the baithak with the police killing all the dons, while Akhandanand shoots Munnawar, dying Sharad crawls up to the seat reserved for the "King of Mirzapur". Akhandanand helps him climb and sit on it, where he succumbs to his wounds, completing Madhuri's revenge for her father's murder. Once again, Akhandanand is on the throne and Madhuri is firmly in power, having achieved her goal of a crime-free state. A distressed Beena finds herself forced to reunite with a now fully healthy Akhandanand. With Solanki's help, Golu springs Guddu from prison to Akhandanand's dismay. Guddu seeing Golu alive, kisses her passionately. In the post-credit scene, Radhiya is seen approaching Maqbool asking for help to save Beena from Akhandanand.

== Production ==
=== Development ===
In August 2016, Amazon Studios collaborated with Excel Entertainment to produce their first two Indian original series for the platform, with one of them titled Inside Edge (2017), which is based on sports, and a crime-thriller series, in order to extend it service in the country, ahead of the launch of Amazon Prime Video in India in December 2016. In March 2017, the makers announced about the crime drama series which is set in Mirzapur in Uttar Pradesh. Rithesh Sidhwani and Farhan Akhtar, said that the series is loosely based on the Netflix series Narcos.

Karan Anshuman created the series, who also wrote the script with Puneet Krishna and Vineet Krishna, and directed the series along with Gurmmeet Singh and Mihir Desai. In an interview with Devarsi Ghosh of Scroll.in, Anshuman stated that he has been a big fan of the Hinterland western genre, and also watched films such as Omkara (2006) and Gangs of Wasseypur series, however, due to the restrictions in the medium, the genre cannot be possible in cinema, as it demands extreme violence and brutality. He added "We had this idea for a gangster drama, and I felt that the best way to do it in India was to set it in the hinterlands, in the back of beyond. We [co-writers Puneet Krishna and Vineet Krishna] had access to a lot of stories based on our research, but we wanted to create a world that was hyper-real and amped up. We created a world of violence where even the nicest person would own a gun and could pull the trigger if the need arose. But the characters and their relationships are emotional. All the characters are heroes in their own arc, so everyone will find someone to relate to."

In March 2020, the makers announced for a third instalment in the series, with its pre-production work being underway. Amazon Prime Video, officially announced for a third season on 12 November 2020.

=== Casting ===
The series revolves around the principal character Pankaj Tripathi who plays the role of Akhandanad Tripathi (Kaleen Bhayya), a mafia boss and millionaire carpet exporter. A 30-second teaser released in October 2018 consists largely of shots from a factory in Mirzapur where guns are manufactured in the garb of carpets, and Kaleen Bhayya is behind this illegal business. Divyendu Sharma, Ali Fazal, Vikrant Massey appears in other principal roles alongside Shweta Tripathi, Shriya Pilgaonkar, Rasika Dugal, Harshita Gaur and Kulbhushan Kharbanda. Anshuman stated that the characters in the series are real, but the world they are in is larger than life, similar to the worlds of Quentin Tarantino and Robert Rodriguez. He eventually conceived that the characters Guddu (Ali Fazal) and Bablu (Vikrant Massey) were inspired two real boys who rode a bike and went around terrorising the town. He further added Guddu's character was inspired by a bodybuilder's look.

In an interview published on an online portal in February 2020, Vikrant Massey revealed that the makers of the series had kept him in dark about his character's demise, till the day of the shoot. Reportedly, Vikrant Massey's character Vinay Pandit (Bablu) was brutally murdered in the climax of Season 1. He exclaimed that the makers had kept his death under the wraps to reportedly make the audiences more curious about his character. But his character did not have a cameo appearance in the second season. Although Shriya's character Swaragini Gupta Pandit (Sweety), had a cameo appearance in the second season.

The second season has the recurring cast from the first one with Sharad Shukla, Vijay Varma, Isha Talwar, Lilliput, Anjum Sharma, Priyanshu Painyuli, Anangsha Biswas and Neha Sargam, joined the new addition to the cast.

=== Filming ===
==== Season 1 ====
Filming of first season began on 27 September 2017, with the badminton sequence being the first scene to be shot. Ali Fazal and Shweta Tripathi joined the sets in Varanasi on 30 September. The story is set in Mirzapur and Bhadohi in Uttar Pradesh, but is fictionalised and was not based on real Mirzapur. The primary locations for the shooting of the series included Jaunpur, Azamgarh, Ghazipur, Lucknow, Raebareli, Gorakhpur, and Varanasi. The show makers have taken aerial shots of the Ganga river in Uttar Pradesh, and Another important location for the series was the Badohi district. Shooting of the series finished in June 2018.

==== Season 2 ====
Post the announcement of the second season in February 2019, the makers kickstarted shoot in May 2019. In a report from BoxOfficeIndia, it was revealed that shooting of the series was done majorly in Uttar Pradesh. Reportedly, the filming started from Lucknow and it was mostly shot in the extensions of the city. The series was also shot in Benaras and some other parts of the state. The makers wrapped the shooting of the series in October 2019.

==== Season 3 ====
Principal photography of the Season 3 begin in June 2022.The series shot in various locations in Uttar Pradesh including Varanasi, Azamgarh, Badohi, Lucknow.

The makers wrapped the shooting of the series in December 2022.

== Music ==
For the songs "Tittar Bittar", Bhaskar roped in his entire band Anand Bhaskar Collective, along with indie musician Isheeta Chakravarty to render vocals for this number. Ginny Diwan, the lyricist of this song penned the lyrics within an hour. Anand stated that "It's an 'item song' from a woman's point of view while a fight is on. I'm grateful the directors supported our wacky ideas". Later he also roped in Shipla Surroch and Keka Ghoshal, who were also independent singers to record the album. Anand Bhaskar planned to compose a wedding song for Guddu (Ali Fazal) and Sweety (Shriya Pilagonkar) which is touted to be a Sufi number. An original song titled "Varoon" was created for the same.

== Marketing ==
A 30-second prologue teaser of the series, which features the voiceover of Pankaj Tripathi was released on 2 October 2018. Another teaser trailer featuring Ali Fazal's character was unveiled on 11 October 2018. The first poster of Mirzapur was released on 16 October 2018, and the following day, the makers released the official trailer of the series on 17 October.

Ahead of the premiere of the second season, fandom of the series erected huge holdings across eight cities in Uttar Pradesh. Mirzapur: Season 2's first two episodes was premiered through Amazon Prime Video on 22 October 2020, a day ahead of its scheduled premiere, and the rest of the episodes were released on 23 October.

== Release ==
=== Streaming ===
Mirzapur had its premiere at the Mumbai Film Festival. The first two episodes were premiered on 27 October 2018 at PVR Versova in Mumbai, which was the only screening of the Prime Original during the festival run. The first season of the series aired on Amazon Prime Video on 16 November 2018, through Hindi, Tamil and Telugu languages.

It was also screened at the Television Critics Association's summer press tour held in Los Angeles in February 2019, where the makers officially announced the second season of the series, along with seven original contents from India.

On 16 November 2019, coinciding the anniversary of the first season, the makers shared the sneak peek of the second season, which eventually announced for a release in March 2020. But the release was further delayed, as post-production works came to a halt due to the COVID-19 pandemic. On 24 August 2020, the makers announced for a scheduled release on 23 October 2020. The trailer was released on 7 October 2020. Although, the second season eventually released with the original Hindi language, the makers released the dubbed Tamil and Telugu version on 11 December 2020.

=== Legal allegation ===
In December 2021, the Allahabad High Court dismissed a criminal complaint filed against the makers of the series for allegedly defaming the city of Mirzapur and for portraying a Brahmin (the protagonist Tripathi family) community in a bad light; the court cited freedom of speech and no intent of malice as its reasons for dismissing the complaint.

== Reception ==
=== Critical response ===
==== Season 1 ====
Mirzapur: Season 1 received mixed reviews from critics to the series. Rohan Naahar of the Hindustan Times, gave two out of five and stated "Mirzapur doesn't aim high, and yet it fails to hit its target. A more mature approach to the violence and a more focused plot would greatly benefit the second season, were there to be one." Ektaa Malik of The Indian Express claimed that "The nine-part series, with almost hour-long episodes, is a tedious watch, and even its top-notch cast can't save this mammoth show from sinking." Saraswati Datar from The News Minute reviewed "A brilliant cast of actors led by Pankaj Tripathi is let down by an inconsistent script and indulgent direction." Saibal Chatterjee of NDTV gave two out of five to the series, and stated "Barring a couple of sequences in the first two episodes, Mirzapur never finds a way out of the drably pedestrian." Stutee Ghosh from The Quint gave two-and-a-half out of five stars and stated "Mirzapur runs out of steam early on and never truly recovers, but it does have one saving grace."

In a positive note, Nandini Ramanth of Scroll.in stated "The violence in Mirzapur is nearly always gratuitous in its operatics, but Pankaj Tripathi's nuanced and hugely enjoyable performance is among the grace notes." Rahul Desai of Film Companion rated it three-out-of-five stars and stated "Featuring some of Hindi cinema's most talented actors, it's no surprise that the performances paper over awkward cracks in the narrative balance."

==== Season 2 ====
Saibal Chatterjee of NDTV, gave two-and-a-half out of five stars and stated "One key difference between the two seasons is in the pacing of the narrative. Season 2, as expected, fires on all cylinders, but in an infinitely more controlled manner. The language continues to be gratingly coarse. However, the scenes of violence, even when they are fervidly excessive, aren't delivered merely to boost the shock quotient as was often the case in S1." Udita Jhunjhunwala from Firstpost reviewed the series, giving three out of five stars and stated "Season 2 ends with what we have come to expect when a game of thrones is afoot – some will die, some will live, and the show will go on."

Ronak Kotecha of The Times of India rated the series three-and-a-half out of five stars and wrote "Mirzapur 2 has that 'killer' combination of power and politics that largely works, but is not bulletproof to flaws." Jyothi Sharma Bawa of Hindustan Times reviewed "For a show that revels in throwing references at you, here is one that Mirzapur 2 offers us right in the beginning – a scorpion with a sting in its tale." Rohit Vats of News18 gave two-and-a-half to the series stating "In Mirzapur 2, Ali Fazal and Pankaj Tripathi are unflinchingly staring at each other amid a barrage of bullets with a commitment to make all this look bizarrely satisfying."

Nandini Ramanath of Scroll.in reviewed "Mirzapur 2 might have not felt the need to invent new characters to ramp up the intrigue. These fresh entrants deliver enough scheming and maneuvering to last 10 episodes, but the show's writers, Puneet Krishna and Vineet Krishna aren't done yet. Like a Marvel Cinematic Universe franchise that stretches on unto eternity, a time-bound story revolving around revenge for fresh wounds is threatening to evolve into a saga that will persist for a few more seasons." Mughda Kapoor of Daily News and Analysis, rated three-and-a-half out of five to the show stating "Living up to the expectations of delivering an action-packed, fierce, and intense season, Mirzapur 2 surely makes for a great watch."

In contrast, Ektaa Malik from The Indian Express gave two out of five stars and stated "Mirzapur 2 doesn't yet fall into the category of 'its soo bad that its good,’ nor does it fit into the 'guilty pleasure' slot." Saraswati Datar of The News Minute stated "The episodes, which start off at a brisk pace, slow down mid-way through the season. Yet this enviable ensemble of actors, who are undoubtedly some of the best in the business today, strive hard to stay invested and keep the proceedings going."

==== Season 3 ====
The third season of Mirzapur has received mixed to negative reviews from critics. Ronak Kotecha of The Times of India gave it a three-and-a-half-stars out of five. She praised the main cast for their performances in this season, while criticizing the pacing in the first half. Arushi Jain of India Today also gave it three-and-a-half stars out of five, and stated that the season feels "flavourful and wholly satisfying" despite following a similar formula as the previous two seasons. She also praised the depiction of the female characters in this season.

Saibal Chatterjee of NDTV rated it two-and-a-half stars out of five, and stated that it has "markedly less tensile strength than the first two seasons" Shubra Gupta of The Indian Express rated it two stars out of five, and said that it is the "weakest season" of the show. Sugandha Rawal of Hindustan Times also provided a critical review, where she said that the show has a "weak storyline, too many main characters & predictable highpoints".

=== Accolades ===
Year	Award	Category	Nominee	Result	Ref.
2019	iReel Awards	Best Drama Series	Mirzapur	Nominated	
2019	iReel Awards	Best Actor – Drama	Pankaj Tripathi	Won	
2019	iReel Awards	Best Supporting Actor	Divyendu Sharma	Won	
2019	iReel Awards	Best Supporting Actress	Rasika Dugal	Nominated	
2021	Asian Academy Creative Awards	Best Original Program by a Streamer/OTT	Mirzapur Season 2	Won	
2021	Filmfare OTT Awards	Best Drama Series	Mirzapur Season 2	Nominated	
2021	Filmfare OTT Awards	Best Drama Series (Critics)	Mirzapur Season 2	Won	
2021	Filmfare OTT Awards	Best Director - Drama	Gurmeet Singh	Nominated	
2021	Filmfare OTT Awards	Best Actor (Female) - Drama	Shweta Tripathi	Nominated	
2021	Filmfare OTT Awards	Best Supporting Actor (Male) - Drama	Ali Fazal	Nominated	
2021	Filmfare OTT Awards	Best Supporting Actor (Male) - Drama	Divyendu Sharma	Nominated	
2021	Filmfare OTT Awards	Best Supporting Actor (Male) - Drama	Pankaj Tripathi	Nominated	

== Other media ==
A film adaptation of the series was announced by Amazon MGM Studios via the Metro-Goldwyn-Mayer label and the production of the film commenced in August 2025. The film was released is on 4 September 2026 amid positive reviews.
