= Mirjapur, Sarlahi =

Mirjapur मिर्जापुर
- Village development committee
- Location in Nepal
- Coordinates: 26.79°N 85.40°E
- Country: Nepal
- Zone: Janakpur Zone
- District: Sarlahi District

Population (1991)
  - Total: 2,631
- Time zone: UTC+5:45 (Nepal Time)

Mirjapur is a village in Sarlahi District in the Janakpur Zone of south-eastern Nepal. At the time of the 1991 Nepal census it had a population of 2,631 in 464 individual households.
