= The Theatre Army Productions =

Indian film production company

The Theatre Army Films
- Company type: Private
- Industry: Film production
- Founded: 2007
- Founder: Gabbar Sangrur
- Headquarters: Chandigarh, Punjab; India
- Area served: India and international
- Key people: Gabbar Sangrur (Founder & Director)
- Products: Line production services, film production
- Divisions: Film, television, commercials

The Theatre Army Films is a North (Punjab/Chandigarh) based production house which was founded by Gabbar Sangrur. This complete line production company has successfully handled line production of Hollywood, Bollywood and Pollywood movies such as West is West, Teen Thay Bhai, Mausam, Love Express, Student of the Year, Surkhaab, Sikander, Stupid Seven, and Yamley Jatt Yamley. In April 2013 it came with a Punjabi movie Heer & Hero under its banner and did line production for upcoming movie Santa Banta featuring Boman Irani and Vir Das.

== Biography ==
The Theatre Army is the brainchild of Gabbar and was formed in 2007. Hailing from Lehragaga, Sangrur district, Gabbar used to do theatre with well-known theatre artist Samuel John until he moved to Chandigarh for doing his post graduation in theatre from Department of Indian Theatre, Panjab University.

He directed a few music videos, followed by getting the big break of handling the line production of the Hollywood movie West is West, which is a British comedy-drama film and the sequel to the award-winning comedy East is East. West is West was set in Pakistan but it was actually shot in Punjab. At its premiere in Chandigarh in 2010, Udwin thanked Gabbar and his team. Line production includes hunting for locales, striking deals with locals, arranging for commute for a film's cast and crew, arranging their boarding and lodging, importing equipment and goods, transportation, catering, movie set construction, security, getting permissions, and arranging all production services.

== Projects ==
After West is West, the Theatre Army has handled line production of various national and international projects such as UUdta Punjab (Hindi), Vivek Kumar and Barkha Madan’s Surkhaab (Indo-Canadian) and Nanak Shah Faqir (Hindi). Surkhaab, which is based on Canada's illegal immigrants, is on the festival circuit and has already bagged a Platinum Remi at Houston Film Fest, and will be screened in Nice, France, as part of the St Tropez International Film Festival.

The list of Bollywood movies includes Teen Thay Bhai, Love Express, Student of the Year and Mausam.

Pankaj Kapoor’s Mausam, which was divided into three parts, certainly had the most enjoyable first part which was shot in Punjab. It was well received and the Theatre Army’s work was admired. The Pollywood projects of The Theatre Army include Jawani Zindabad, Channa Sachi Muchi, Veeran Naal Sardari, Pinky Moge Wali, Yamley Jatt Yamley, Stupid Seven and Sikander.

Heer & Hero, the debut Punjabi movie of Minissha Lamba, is under production by the Theatre Army.

Their list of television projects includes Guinness World Record, India's Got Talent, Rattan ka Rishta, Veena Malik Ka Swayambar and The Bachelorette India - Mere Khayalon Ki Mallika.

== Filmography ==
Filmography
Film	Language	Role
Amar Singh Chamkila	Hindi	Line producer (Punjab)
White Panjab	Punjabi	Producer / Distributor
Yes I Am Student	Punjabi	Line producer
Guru Nanak Jahaz	Punjabi	Line producer
Sam Bahadur	Hindi	Line producer (Punjab)
The Diplomat	Hindi	Line producer (Punjab)
Sanjog (Upcoming)	Punjabi	Line producer
Mastaney	Punjabi	Line producer
Mehar	Punjabi	Line producer
Parinda	Punjabi	Line producer
Khadari	Punjabi	Line producer
Hoshiar Singh	Punjabi	Line producer
Jalwayu Enclave	Punjabi	Producer / Distributor
Ikko Mikke	Punjabi	Line producer
Kali Jotta	Punjabi	Line producer
Parahuna 1 & 2	Punjabi	Line producer
Babli Bouncer	Hindi	Line producer (Punjab)
The Return (Upcoming)	Hindi	Line producer (Punjab)
Tabbar (Web series)	Hindi	Line producer (Punjab)
Ikkis	Hindi	Line producer (Punjab)
De De Pyaar De 2	Hindi	Line producer (Punjab)
Khaao Piyo Aish Karo	Punjabi	Line producer
Paani Ch Madhani	Punjabi	Line producer
Sohreyan Da Pind Aa Gya	Punjabi	Line producer
Heer & Hero	Punjabi	Producer
Daadi Ki Shaadi	Hindi	Line producer (Punjab)
Campus Diaries Season 1 (Web series)	Hindi	Line producer (Punjab)
Street Dancer 3D	Hindi	Line producer (Punjab)
Gold	Hindi	Line producer (Punjab)
Stupid 7	Punjabi	Line producer
Daana Paani	Punjabi	Line producer
Range Road 290	Punjabi	Distributor
Masand	Punjabi	Distributor
The Gangland In Mother Land (Web series)	Punjabi	Writer / Director
Udta Punjab	Hindi	Line producer
Munda South Hall Da	Punjabi	Line producer (India)
Srinivasa kalyanam	South	Line producer (Punjab)

Also associated with

Films	Language	Role
Brownian Movement	Dutch	
Student of the Year	Hindi	Line producer
Fitoor	Hindi	Line producer
Qissa	Indo-German	
Gold (upcoming)	Hindi	Line producer

TV shows	Role
Savdhaan India	Line producer
Gumraah	
Mann Mein Hai Vishvas	
Guinness World Record	Audition organizer
Rattan Ka Rishta	
Extreme Makeover	
India’s Got Talent	
