= Shaadi Mein Zaroor Aana =

2017 Indian film by Ratnaa Sinha

- Theatrical release poster
- Directed by: Ratnaa Sinha
- Written by: Kamal Pandey
- Produced by: Vinod Bachchan; Manju Bachchan
- Starring: Rajkummar Rao; Kriti Kharbanda
- Cinematography: Suresh Beesaveni
- Edited by: Ballu Saluja
- Music by: Songs: Anand Raj Anand; JAM8; Arko Pravo Mukherjee; Zain-Sam-Raees; Rashid Khan; Score: Prasad Sashte
- Production companies: Soundrya Productions; Soham Rockstar Entertainment
- Distributed by: UFO Movies India; ZEE5; Raj Mediaflix
- Release date: 10 November 2017
- Running time: 137 minutes
- Country: India
- Language: Hindi
- Box office: ₹194 million

Shaadi Mein Zaroor Aana (transl. Do Attend the Wedding) is a 2017 Indian Hindi-language romance drama comedy film directed by Ratnaa Sinha and written by Kamal Pandey. Produced by Vinod and Manju Bachchan, the film features Rajkummar Rao and Kriti Kharbanda, alongside K. K. Raina, Alka Amin, Vipin Sharma, Govind Namdev, Navni Parihar, Nayani Dixit, and Manoj Pahwa.

Shaadi Mein Zaroor Aana is the journey of two individuals, Satyendra and Aarti, who come together through a marriage proposal and fall in love; however, their individual decisions and destiny take them in different directions. The music was composed by Anand Raj Anand, JAM8, and Arko, while all the lyrics were written by Kumaar.

Shaadi Mein Zaroor Aana had a worldwide release on 10 November 2017, and received mixed reviews from critics. The film earned ₹87 million (US$930,000) in its first week eventually collecting a lifetime worldwide gross of ₹194 million (US$2.1 million). In May 2025, Kriti Kharbanda "excitedly" announced a re-release of Shaadi Mein Zaroor Aana.

At the Stardust Awards, Shaadi Mein Zaroor Aana received the Best Film nomination. At the Zee Cine Awards, Jyotica Tangri won Best Female Playback Singer (for "Pallo Latke").

== Plot ==
Middle-class Aarti Shukla is set to marry Satyendra "Sattu" Mishra, after they both agree to an arranged marriage. On the day of the wedding, Aarti learns she has cleared the PCS exam, a gateway to a comfortable life as a civil servant. Sattu's mother is strict and will not allow Aarti to work after marriage, so Aarti abandons the wedding at the last minute. Sattu, from a middle-class background as well, is forced to sell family heirlooms to recoup losses for the wedding, including repayment of dowry to the Shuklas.

Five years later, Aarti works as a PCS officer in Lucknow. She crosses paths with Sattu again, who is now the district magistrate, after himself clearing the prestigious Indian Administrative Service exam. Aarti has become embroiled in a corruption scandal, and Sattu is assigned with investigating the accusation. He has not forgotten his family's humiliation at the hands of the Shuklas, and sees the case as a means for revenge.

After weeks of investigation, Sattu learns that Aarti is innocent; the alleged bribes were taken without her knowledge by her staff, who are now planning to have her killed. He has her placed in police custody before the case is heard. She is later released, once the perpetrators are arrested. Seeing Sattu's integrity and actions taken to protect her, Aarti has a change of heart. She starts pursuing Sattu, suggesting that the two get married, but he is uninterested.

Some time later, the Shuklas invite the Mishras to Aarti's wedding. At the local temple, Sattu encounters Aarti's fiancé, Sharad, and cautions him against marrying Aarti. This causes her to angrily confront Sattu behind the temple. After a prolonged argument, Aarti kisses Sattu, showing she is still interested in him. She invites him to the wedding and leaves. Sattu has no plans to attend, but accompanies his parents, who have surprisingly decided to go. At the event, Sattu learns that both families were in on the act, and that this is actually his own wedding. Sharad is Aarti's brother-in-law, who was playing along to get a reaction from him. Sattu realises he still has feelings for Aarti, and the two end up getting married.

== Cast ==
- Rajkummar Rao as IAS Satyendra "Sattu" Kumar Mishra, Aarti's love interest and husband
- Kriti Kharbanda as PCS Aarti Satyendra Mishra / Shukla, Satyendra's love interest and wife
- Govind Namdev as Shyam Sunder "S. S." Shukla, Aarti's father
- Navni Parihar as Manju Shukla, Aarti's mother
- Nayani Dixit as Aabha Sharad/Shukla, Aarti's sister; Sharad's wife
- Manoj Pahwa as Jogi Sinha, Aarti maternal uncle
- K. K. Raina as Jugal Kishore "J. K." Mishra, Satyendra's father
- Alka Amin as Shanti Mishra, Satyendra's mother
- Vipin Sharma as Mahesh Kumar, Satyendra's maternal uncle
- Abhijeet Singh as Ranjan Sinha, Aarti cousin
- Neha D. Bhriguvanshi as Neelam Gupta, Aarti's ex-friend; a fraudster and corrupted person who involves Aarti in corruption case
- Karanvir Sharma as Sharad, Aabha's husband; Aarti's fake fiancée
- Ashish Kapoor as Mr. Kukreja, Neelam's corruption partner
- Mahesh Chandra Deva as Rajesh Yadav, Neelam's husband; Neelam and Mr.Kukreja's co-corruption partner
- Rakesh Dubey as Satyendra's PSO
- Sanath Gaur as Mahesh's uncle
- Ashok Kumar as Satyendra's official bungalow servant
- Ajitesh Gupta as Priyansh Yadav Satyendra's friend
- Vivek Yadav as Biker Boy

== Production ==
=== Development ===
In February 2017, producer Vinod Bachchan made the official announcement about his film Shaadi Mein Zaroor Aana with Rajkummar Rao and Kriti Kharbanda in lead roles. Filmmaker Ratnaa Sinha, wife of Anubhav Sinha marked her directorial debut with the film.

=== Casting ===
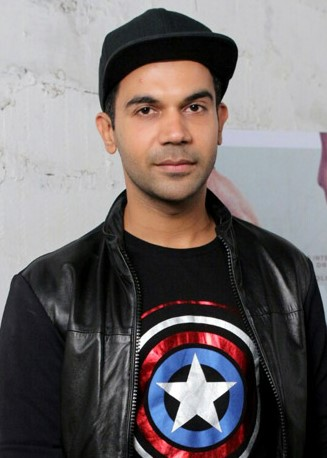
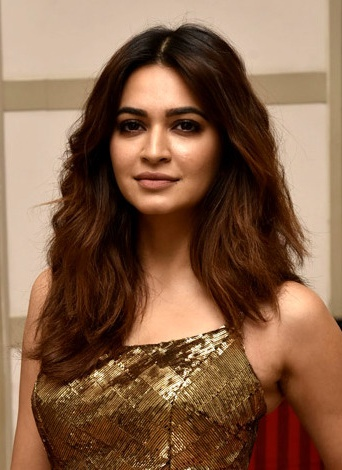
The film starred Rajkummar Rao and Kriti Kharbanda in their first collaboration.

Rajkummar Rao was cast to play the lead, Satyendra Mishra, and was director Sinha's first choice. Rao added, "My character has a journey that travels the phase from a small town guy falling in love with a girl to becoming a successful, rich guy. It is a revenge story and how love makes you do things that you cannot do otherwise."

Kriti Kharbanda was cast to play Aarti Shukla, the other lead. Kharbanda stated "script" as the reason behind choosing the film and added, "Shaadi Mein Zaroor Aana is my most passionate project till date. I feel nothing but love for the characters of this film altogether." For the role of Aarti, the first choice of Sinha was Taapsee Pannu, who had reportedly came on board to do the film but later on decided against doing so citing lack of dates.

K. K. Raina and Alka Amin were cast to play Satyendra's parents. Govind Namdev and Navni Parihar were cast to play Aarti's parents. Nayani Dixit played Aarti's sister, Vipin Sharma and Manoj Pahwa were cast as Satyendra and Aarti's uncle respectively.

=== Filming ===
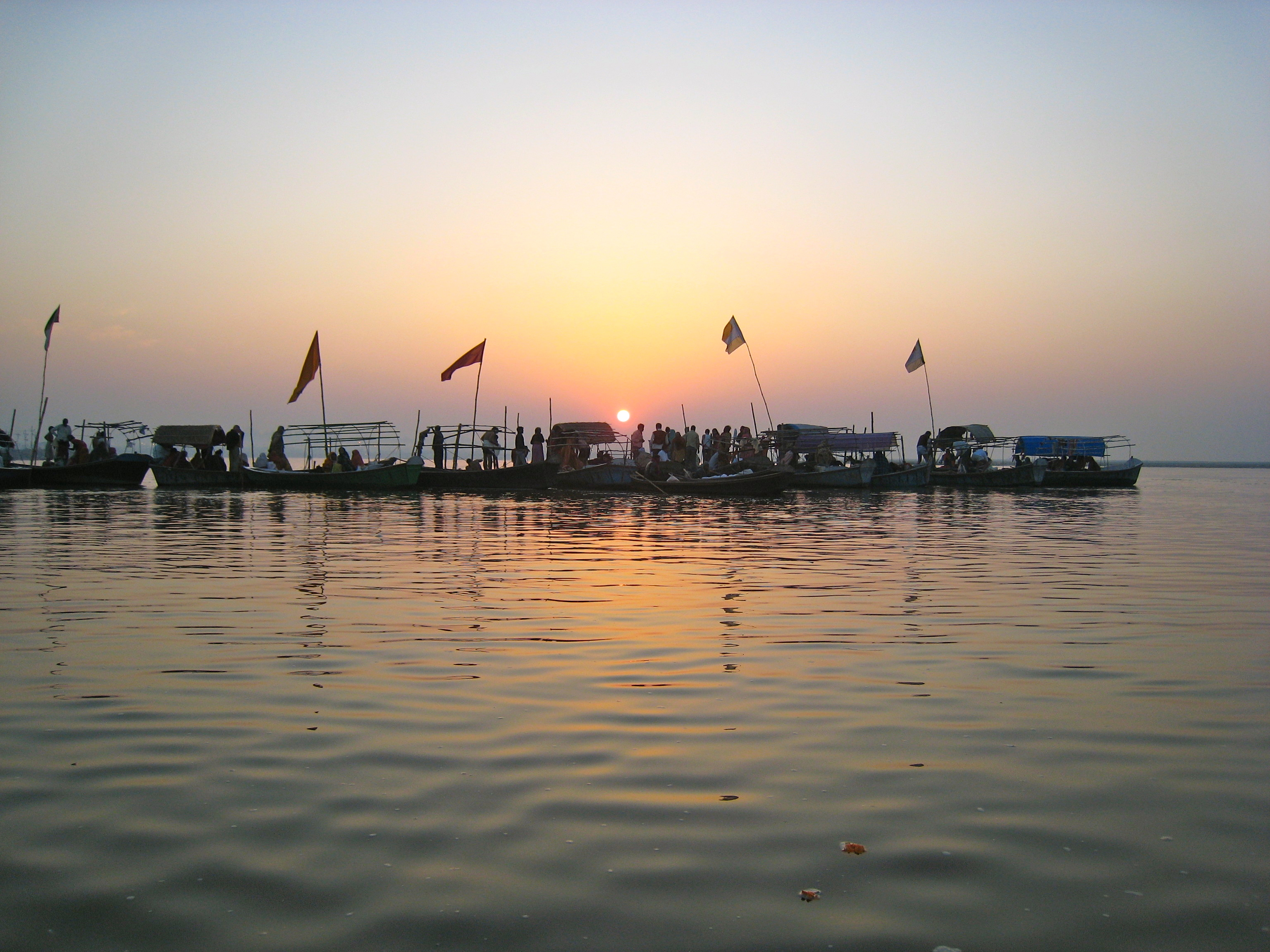
A portion of the film was shot at the Triveni Sangam, Allahabad

The principal photography of Shaadi Mein Zaroor Aana began in March 2017 in Allahabad. A major portion of the film was shot at Hanuman Mandir, Civil Lines, Lord Curzon Bridge and the Triveni Sangam. Following this, there was a 30-day schedule in Lucknow, including at Ambedkar Memorial Park. The final schedule of the film took place in Kanpur. A set worth ₹20 million was created in Lucknow by art director Arup Adhikari, Casting Director Vivek Yadav (Casting Director) set designer Shabiul Haasan and their team to film the wedding sequence that formed the climax.

== Soundtrack ==
Shaadi Mein Zaroor Aana

Soundtrack album by Arko, KAG for JAM8, Raees-Zain-Sam, Anand Raaj Anand & Rashid Khan
- Released: 26 October 2017
- Genre: Feature film soundtrack
- Length: 44:32
- Language: Hindi
- Label: Zee Music Company

Singles from Shaadi Mein Zaroor Aana
- 1. "Main Hoon Saath Tere" Released: 26 October 2017; 2. "Tu Banja Gali Benaras Ki" Released: 27 October 2017

The soundtrack album of Shaadi Mein Zaroor Aana comprises eleven songs composed by Arko Pravo Mukherjee, Kaushik-Akash-Guddu (KAG) For JAM8, Zain-Sam-Raees, Anand Raaj Anand and Rashid Khan while the lyrics were written by Kumaar, Shakeel Azmi, Gaurav Krishna Bansal, Arko and Kunaal Vermaa.

Vocals on the album's eight tracks were performed by several singers mainly Yasser Desai, Arijit Singh, and Shafqat Amanat Ali. It was produced under the Zee Music label. The song "Pallo Latke" is a remake of a popular Rajasthani folk song. Lyrics of the song "Mera Intkam Dekheg" was written by IRTS officer Gaurav Krishna Bansal.

Shaadi Mein Zaroor Aana (Original Motion Picture Soundtrack)
No.	Title	Lyrics	Music	Singer(s)	Length
1.	"Jogi"	Arko	Arko	Yasser Desai and Aakanksha Sharma	04:33
2.	"Main Hoon Saath Tere"	Shakeel Azmi, Kunaal Verma	JAM8 (Kaushik-Akash-Guddu)	Arijit Singh	04:40
3.	"Pallo Latke"	Kumaar (Rap lyrics: Rossh)	Zain-Saim-Raees	Jyotica Tangri and Yasser Desai (Rap: Fazilpuria)	04:56
4.	"Tu Banja Gali Benaras Ki"	Shakeel Azmi	Rashid Khan	Asit Tripathy	04:08
5.	"Mera Intkam Dekhegi"	Gaurav Krishna Bansal	Anand Raaj Anand	Krishna Beura	03:00
6.	"Jogi" (female version)	Arko	Arko	Aakanksha Sharma	03:44
7.	"Jogi" (reprise)	Arko	Arko	Shafqat Amanat Ali	03:49
8.	"Main Hoon Saath Tere" (reprise)	Shakeel Azmi, Kunaal Verma	JAM8 (Kaushik-Akash-Guddu)	Shivangi Bhayana	04:23
9.	"Tu Banja Gali Benaras Ki" (reprise)	Shakeel Azmi	Rashid Khan	Shafqat Amanat Ali	04:10
10.	"Tu Banja Gali Benaras Ki" (Feat. Asees Kaur)	Shakeel Azmi	Rashid Khan	Asees Kaur	04:06
11.	"Mera Intkam Dekhegi" (reprise)	Gaurav Krishna Bansal	Anand Raaj Anand	Anand Raaj Anand	03:01
12.	"Royee Jande Naina"	Kumaar	Vivek Kar	Nitin Gupta	03:24
Total length:					44:32

=== Critical reception ===
Bollywood Hungama gave the album 3 out of 5 stars and noted in its music review that, "What works for the music of Shaadi Mein Zaroor Aana is the fact that there is a constant 'sur' right through its playing time which doesn't cause a distraction. The sound is uniform and helps the album to play on well through its duration." Vipin Nair of The Hindu in his review said that the soundtrack is "entirely missable" and gave it a rating of 2.5 out of 5 stars. Renuka Vyavahare of The Times of India gave the movie 3 out of 5 stars and wrote "The film could have been much better than it eventually turns out to be. But if you don’t mind watching a modest family drama, reminiscent of the 90s, you won’t mind being privy to this emotional alliance". Nandini Ramnath of Scroll.in wrote "For a movie that does a better job of balancing a jilted groom’s hurt pride with the almost-bride’s professional ambitions, watch Badrinath Ki Dulhania".

== Release ==
Shaadi Mein Zaroor Aana's first poster was released on 10 October 2017. The film's trailer was released in the same month. Shaadi Mein Zaroor Aana was theatrically released on 10 November 2017. In December 2017, the film was also screened at the Rashtrapati Bhawan. Post its release, the film was made available on Zee5.

== Reception ==
=== Critical response ===
Namrata Joshi of The Hindu was impressed with the acting performances of all actors but criticized the implausible revenge story that the film becomes in its second half. Sweta Kaushal of Hindustan Times gave the film a rating of 3.5 out of 5 and noted, "Rajkummar’s transformation is impressive and Kriti effortlessly essays her role. All other character actors are a treat to watch. The film, however, leans too much on clichés. Songs are abrupt and obstruct the narrative. The filmmakers have also relied heavily on melodrama but despite these minor hiccups, this is an invitation you must not miss." Urvi Parikh of Rediff.com was critical of the weak storyline of the film and its slow pacing. The critic gave the film a rating of 1.5 out of 5.

Bollywood Hungama praised the concept of the film but criticized its uninspired execution and gave the film a rating of 2 out of 5. The website appreciated the acting performance of Rajkummar Rao but was critical of the writers for their confused presentation of his character. Kriti Tulsiani of News18 praised the acting performances of all actors but criticized the poorly written script which she felt was not just unreasonable but also out-dated, and gave the film a rating of 2 out of 5. Rachit Gupta of Filmfare applauded the makers for taking up issues that are very relevant to our society but was critical of the way they were handled. Rachit felt that the film suffers a lot from the usage of outdated [cliché]s and too much [melodrama] and gave it a rating of 2.5 out of 5. Meena Iyer of DNA India praised the acting performance of Rajkummar Rao but felt that the film lacked conviction and could not tap its entire potential. Meena gave the film a rating of 2.5 out of 5. Ravi Bulle of Amarujala generally praised the movie and wrote "If you like family/marriage dramas, then this film will sweeten your mouth".

=== Box office ===
Shaadi Mein Zaroor Aana collected ₹50 lakhs on its first date. In its first week, it collected ₹6.35 crore. By the end of its theatrical run, the film collected approximately ₹19.4 crore and became an "average grosser" at the box office.

== Accolades ==
Award	Date of ceremony (Note: Date is linked to the article about the awards held that year, wherever possible.)	Category	Recipient(s) and nominee(s)	Result	Ref.
Stardust Awards	19 December 2017	Best Film	Shaadi Mein Zaroor Aana	Nominated	
Zee Cine Awards	30 December 2017	Best Female Playback Singer	Jyotica Tangri (For the song "Pallo Latke")	Won	
Mirchi Music Awards	28 January 2018	Upcoming Male Vocalist of The Year	Asit Tripathy (For the song "Tu Banja Gali Benaras Ki")	Won	

== Legacy ==
Shaadi Mein Zaroor Aana is regarded among the most popular films related to the Civil Services Examination. The film's song "Mera Intkam Dekhegi", became an anthem song for many aspirants preparing for UPSC and other competitive exams. The film brought recognition to Kriti Kharbanda and proved to be her breakthrough in Hindi films. She termed it the film that "changed her life". Shaadi Mein Zaroor Aana is also noted for its fresh take on arrange marriage.

== See also ==
- List of highest-grossing Bollywood films
- List of Hindi films of 2017
