= Kriti Kharbanda =

Indian actress (born 1990)

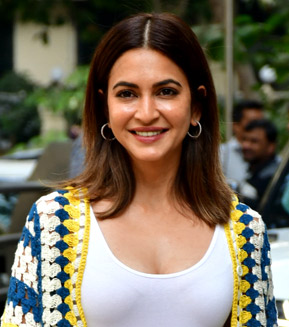
- Kharbanda in 2025
- Born: 29 October 1990 (age 36); New Delhi, India
- Education: Sri Bhagawan Mahaveer Jain College
- Occupation: Actress
- Years active: 2009–present
- Spouse: Pulkit Samrat (m. 2024)

Kriti Kharbanda (born 29 October 1990) is an Indian actress who works predominantly in Hindi, Kannada and Telugu language films. Kharbanda is a recipient of several accolades including a SIIMA Award, and nominations for two Filmfare Awards South.

After beginning her career as a model, Kharbanda made her acting debut in the Telugu film Boni (2009) and her Kannada debut with Chirru (2010). Following a few unsuccessful films, she received the SIIMA Award for Best Actress - Kannada nomination for portraying a medical student in Googly (2013) and for Super Ranga (2014), winning the SIIMA Critics Award for Best Actress – Kannada for the latter. She portrayed an IAS aspirant in Bruce Lee: The Fighter (2015), for which she received Filmfare and SIIMA Award for Best Supporting Actress – Telugu nominations. Kharbanda's other successful films include the Kannada films, Tirupathi Express (2014), Belli (2014) and Minchagi Nee Baralu (2015).

Kharbanda made her Hindi film debut with Raaz: Reboot (2016) and played a PCS Officer in Shaadi Mein Zaroor Aana (2017), which proved to be her breakthrough. Her other notable Hindi films include Yamla Pagla Deewana: Phir Se (2018), Housefull 4 (2019), which is her highest-grossing release, Taish (2020) and 14 Phere (2021). She earned further praise for her streaming debut Rana Naidu (2025).

In addition to her acting career, Kharbanda is a prominent celebrity endorser for various brands and products. She also support a number of causes. Kharbanda is married to actor Pulkit Samrat.

== Early life and education ==
Kriti Kharbanda was born on 29 October 1990 in a Punjabi Hindu family in New Delhi. She has a younger sister Ishita Kharbanda and a younger brother Jaiwardhan Kharbanda, who is the co-founder of Paper Plane Productions. She moved to Bangalore in the early 1990s with her family.

Kharbanda was educated at Baldwin Girls' High School, Bangalore, and at the Bishop Cotton Girls' School, Bangalore. She was graduated from Sri Bhagawan Mahaveer Jain College, Bangalore. She also holds a diploma in jewellery designing.

According to her, she was very active in cultural activities during school and college. As a child, she was also featured in a number of advertisements and she continued modelling while in school/college, stating that she "always loved doing TV commercials". Her prominent modelling campaigns during her college days were for Bhima Jewellers, Spar, and Fair & Lovely. Her photo on the Spar billboard caught the attention of NRI director Raj Pippala who was looking for a heroine for his film, and that paved the way for her acting career. She said that she had initially no plans of becoming an actress and that it was only because of her mother's encouragement that she considered it seriously.

== Career ==
=== Early career (2009–2012) ===
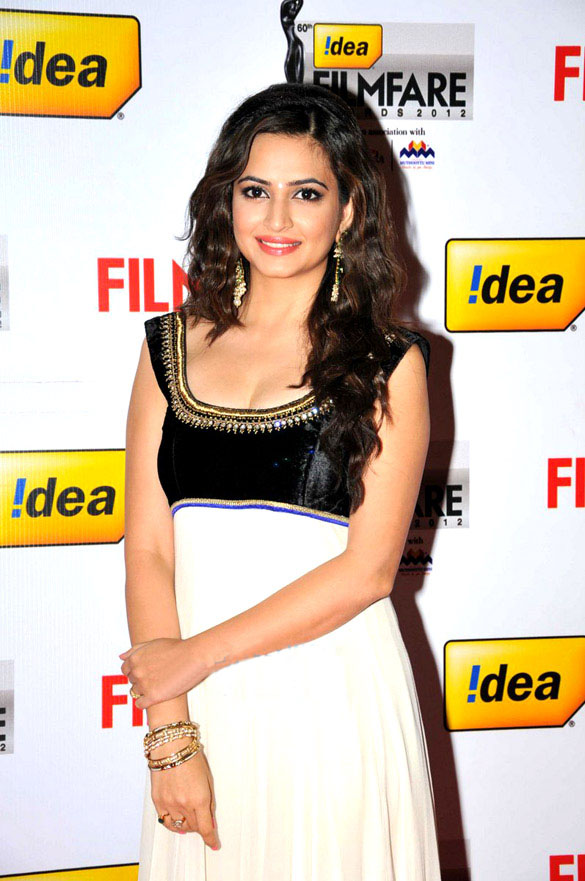
Kharbanda at the Filmfare Awards South

After being seen on the Spar billboard, Kharbanda was cast in a lead role for the Telugu film Boni opposite Sumanth. Boni received negative reviews but fetched Kharbanda a positive response. While Sify wrote, "Kriti was a good choice and she had no tense moments despite her debut. Her looks are gorgeous and she has a lot of future if she plays her cards correctly", Radhika Rajamani of Rediff.com wrote, "Kriti Kharbanda looks fresh and pretty and manages to play the part of Pragati in a fairly convincing way. She may have to work on her expressions a bit in future, though". Although the film was unsuccessful at the box office, She landed a prominent role in the Pawan Kalyan film Teen Maar. Her next release, however, was her debut Kannada film, Chirru. Her performance was mostly well received, with The Times of India writing that she "excels in her performance". and Indiaglitz.com stating that she "is very pretty and her expressions are good". IANS wrote that she "looks ravishing in song sequences" and "is good at dancing". The film was a hit at the box office, and Kharbanda stated that it got her recognition and "a fair amount of admiration in the industry", resulting in her being offered numerous projects in Kannada. However, she took a long time to sign her second Kannada film, until October 2011, when she signed up for four films in a single month.

In 2011, Kharbanda was seen in a guest role in the successful Telugu romantic comedy Ala Modalaindi, before Teen Maar was released. She appeared in "retro scenes" in Teen Maar in which she had to "replicate heroines from the 70s" and revealed that she also chose the costumes and jewellery she wore in the film. The film turned out to be an average grosser. The following year, she acted in Mr. Nookayya alongside Manoj Manchu in Telugu, and in Prem Adda, a remake of the Tamil film Subramaniapuram, in Kannada. The latter film featured her in a "completely de-glam" role, with the actress stating that her fair complexion posed a problem to her as she played a small town girl from the 80s. She called Girija the most challenging character she had played till then, since it required a no-makeup look, get a tan and walk barefoot to attain "a raw look" like the role demanded. For the film, she also designed her costumes along with her mother.

=== Career progression and critical acclaim (2013–2019) ===
Kharbanda had four releases in 2013, two each in Telugu and Kannada. Her first release was Kannada film Galaate opposite Prajwal Devaraj. A critic for Times of India stated that she gives life to her role. In her next Telugu film, Bhaskar's Ongole Githa opposite Ram Pothineni, she played a "typical town girl", Karthik Pasupulate mentioned, "Kriti looks cute and does a decent job of holding her own despite playing a character with little scope to do any acting." Her next release was Kalyan Ram's Om 3D, the first 3D action film in Telugu cinema, both films did not perform well at the box office.

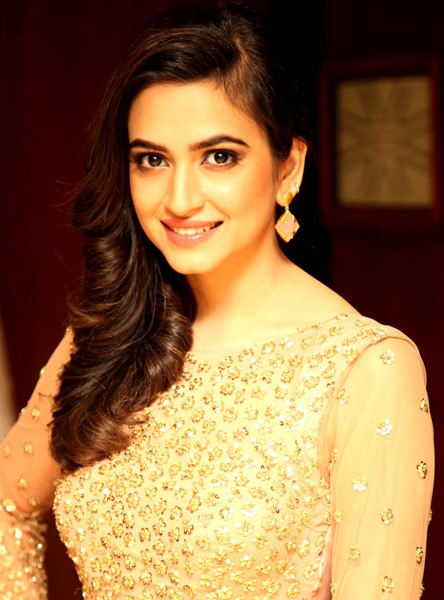
Kharbanda at an event in 2013

Kharbanda's career in Kannada, however, saw an upswing with the romantic comedy Googly, her last release of the year. She portrayed a medical student Swathi opposite Yash. Her performance was lauded by critics with G. S. Kumar stating, "Kriti has given life to her character." A critic of Sify in particular, praised Kharbanda, calling her "The heart and soul of the movie...who emerges triumphant on the big screen with some fine acting". The film went on to collect over ₹15 crores at the box office, emerging as the third highest-grossing Kannada film of the year. She stated that she received a lot of offers after Googly including two Bollywood projects that she had to refuse since she was too busy shooting for her previously signed films. The film earned her SIIMA Award for Best Actress – Kannada nomination.

Following Googly's success, Kharbanda had three Kannada releases in 2014: Her first release was Tirupathi Express, a remake of the Telugu film Venkatadri Express. She played a techie opposite Sumanth Shailendra. Shashi Prasad noted, "Kriti who has struck hat-trick opportunities after her Googly success, makes another 'beautiful' comeback while filling the much needed glamour quotient." She then appeared in Super Ranga opposite Upendra, playing a modern girl Naina. Her performance fetched her positive reviews and S. Viswanath of Deccan Chronicle noted, "Kriti, simply adores the screen with her beauty and in the real sense, the beautiful kick for the audience." For the film, she earned the SIIMA Critics Award for Best Actress - Kannada, alongside nominations for Filmfare Award for Best Actress – Kannada and SIIMA Best Actress – Kannada award. Kharbanda's final release of the year was Belli opposite Shiva Rajkumar. IB Times's critic found her to be "a treat to watch". Super Ranga was a box office success, while Belli became a box office average.

Kharbanda's first release in 2015 was opposite Diganth in Minchagi Nee Baralu. She received special praise for her performance, with Sunayana Suresh stating that she's the "biggest plus point of the film". She next portrayed an IAS aspirant in the Telugu film Bruce Lee: The Fighter co-starring Ram Charan. A critic from Sify found her to be "apt" in her role. The film was a box office average. She earned nominations for Filmfare Award for Best Supporting Actress – Telugu and SIIMA Award for Best Supporting Actress – Telugu for the film. In 2016, Kharbanda expanded to Hindi films with Raaz Reboot opposite Emraan Hashmi and Gaurav Arora. The film received mixed reviews and was a box office failure.

Kharbanda had four film releases in 2017: She first made her Tamil film debut opposite G. V. Prakash Kumar in Bruce Lee. It received negative reviews from critics. The same year, she played the lead in Maasthi Gudi a Kannada film, opposite Duniya Vijay. Kharbanda also starred in two Hindi films. Firstly in the comedy drama Guest iin London opposite Kartik Aaryan. Firstpost's Renil Abraham noted, "Kartik Aryan and Kriti Kharbanda looks good and plays the role well. They've been styled well too." She next portrayed a PCS officer in the romantic comedy Shaadi Mein Zaroor Aana opposite Rajkummar Rao. She received mentions for her performance. A critic from Bollywood Hungama wrote that she does a much better job here than her previous Hindi releases. While Rachit Gupta of Filmfare stated that she gave her career's "best performance" in the film. Guest iin London failed at the box office, while Shaadi Mein Zaroor Aana was a moderate success.

Kharbanda had four releases in 2018 too. Her first appearance was in Karwaan opposite Dulquer Salmaan. Renuka Vyavahare found her to be "likeable" in her special appearance. She next played the lead in the Kannada film Dalapathi opposite Prem. A critic from Times of India praised her and stated, "Kriti looks like a million bucks, and one wonders why we don't see her on screen as often in Kannada films, given how she effortlessly charms the audience." Her next releases was Veerey Ki Wedding opposite Pulkit Samrat, where she played a Punjabi girl. Critic from Hindustan Times said that she as Geet is "effervescent and pretty", but sadly is "limited" by a badly written script. She delivers what is expected of her. Her final release that year was Yamla Pagla Deewana: Phir Se opposite Bobby Deol, where she played a Gujarati surgeon. Jyoti Sharma Bawa wrote, "Kriti plays a Gujarati surgeon who loves her booze and should have had her license revoked a long time back." The film had poor box office returns.

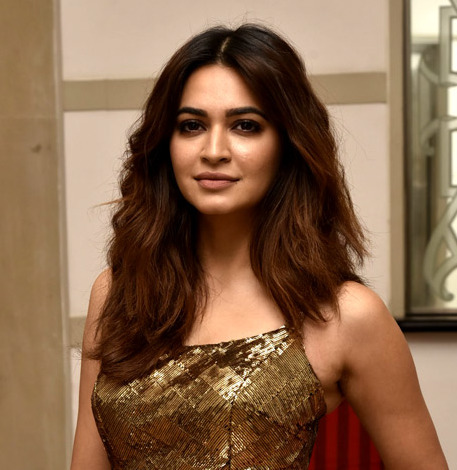
Kharbanda in 2018

Kharbanda starred in two comedy ensembles in 2019. Her first release of the year was the reincarnation comedy Housefull 4, where she portrayed Rajkumari Meena and Neha opposite Bobby Deol and Riteish Deshmukh. It became her highest grossing release with a worldwide gross collection of ₹296 crore and was the year's fourth highest grossing release. Monika Rawal Kukreja opined, "Kriti Kharbanda brings freshness to the screen but, her poor dialogue delivery is distracting." Later that year, she appeared in Anees Bazmee's Pagalpanti alongside Pulkit Samrat, playing a gangster's daughter. Critic from Bollywood Hungama noted, "Of all the heroines, Kriti Kharbanda gets to play an interesting character and she does justice."

=== Expansion and streaming projects (2020–present) ===
Kharbanda's only release in 2020 was Bejoy Nambiar's Taish opposite Jim Sarbh and Pulkit Samrat, which released on ZEE5 as a feature film and six-episode series. Pallabi Dey Purkayastha mentions, "Kriti, Sanjeeda and Saloni play three very different women standing at three crucial junctions in their respective lives. As Arfa, Kharbanda is a sucker for love and the peacemaker of the livid gang." In 2021, she appeared in ZEE5's 14 Phere, directed by Devanshu Singh opposite Vikrant Massey, playing a Jatt girl Aditi. Stutee Ghosh of The Quint wrote, "Kriti Kharbanda as Aditi, has a very thinly written character sketch, but she manages to be charming throughout."

Following a four year hiatus from screen, Kharbanda expanded to web with the second season of Rana Naidu, where she played an ambitious entrepreneur opposite Himanshu Malhotra and Rana Daggubati. Sangeetha Devi Dundoo stated, "Kriti is a notable addition, portraying a morally ambiguous character with ease." Mayur Sanap noted, "The most enjoyable of all is Kriti's scheming woman who is just so nonchalant about her nasty ways. It's a delicious character and Kriti plays her with complete relish." Kharbanda will next appear in Abir Sengupta's Risky Romeo opposite Sunny Singh.

== Personal life ==
Kharbanda met actor Pulkit Samrat in 2018 and they eventually started dating in 2019. The couple has worked together in the films — Veerey Ki Wedding, Pagalpanti and Taish. After being in a relationship for five years, the couple got engaged in 2024. Kharbanda married Samrat in a traditional Hindu wedding ceremony, on 15 March 2024, in Manesar, Haryana.

Kharbanda has a keen interest in pole dance and is often seen practicing it. She says, "Pole dance has become a part of not just my fitness, but also my meditation."

== Off-screen work ==
Kharbanda decided to sponsor the education for 30 girls through her association with the NGO "Shiksha Seva Foundation", that works at educating girl child, on her 30th birthday in 2020. She has also worked associated with an NGO that works towards the cause of animals, especially during summer, by providing them water and shelter.

Kharbanda has been associated with Celebrity Cricket League. Since 2011, she has supported "Karnataka Bulldozers" and other teams at the league. All the seasons of the league aim to create awareness about a social issue. In 2022, Kharbanda indulged in an interactive session with actor Chris Hemsworth on "holistic wellbeing". She has ramp walked in the Lakme Fashion Week and has been the cover model for several magazines.

She has been outspoken on issues such as feminism. She said, "We say all are just equals. I believe there cannot be any discrimination between man and woman or that one of them can function without the other. However, I also believe women are stronger in terms of dealing with their emotions."

=== Controversy ===
Kharbanda had criticised actress Hina Khan for her comment on "South Indian" actresses. Khan said, "South makers like to cast women who are on the heavier side". On this, Kharbanda lashed out at the actress and said, "Hina Khan is a very big name on television. That is not how you talk about people. There is no need to (say such things on national television). It's rather unfortunate that an actor is talking like that, and an actor of that caliber, that too." She also wanted to slap the actress for her comment.

== Artistry and public image ==
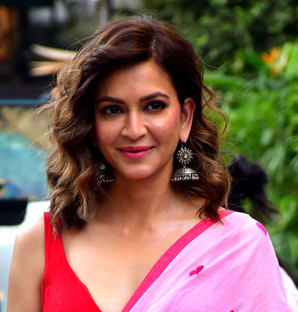
Kharbanda in 2025

Kharbanda has established herself as one of the most popular celebrities in Kannada cinema. Post her film debut, she was termed "ebullient, beautiful and promising". Following the success of Googly, she became a sought-after actress in Kannada cinema. Kharbanda feels the film "changed her career overnight". She termed it as her favourite and said, "It's my favourite because I enjoyed working on that film. I felt I could do justice to the character and the character did justice to me." In 2013, she was ranked 8th in Top Sandalwood Actresses List.

Firstpost find her to be "a perfect blend" of solid acting chops, expressive face, arresting glamour, and a dazzling screen presence. Kharbanda feels Shaadi Mein Zaroor Aana is a film that "changed her life". Kharbanda is known to be "extremely detail-oriented", when it comes to her craft. On her work style, Kharbanda said that she is "grateful to have reached a position in her career", where she can refuse work that doesn't excite her and "rely on her instincts while choosing characters". On getting typecast, she said,

"It's going to help me grow as an actor. Go ahead, typecast, I don't have any issue. Everyone who's looked at being typecast negatively, you've been challenged to outdo your own previous performance. That's the best kind of competition when you're competing with yourself".

Kharbanda's rise to popularity resulted in her being voted Bangalore Times Most Desirable Women of 2013 and 2015. In the same list, she was placed 2nd in 2012, 3rd in 2014, 2nd in 2017 and 7th in 2018. She is subsequently featured in the Times' 50 Most Desirable Women List. She ranked 32nd in 2017, 37th in 2018, 18th in 2019 and 27th in 2020. Apart from acting, Kharbanda is an endorser for several brands and products, including Oppo and PC Jeweller. For Oppo, she also shot a short film with Sidharth Malhotra. She is the brand ambassador of Pebble watches alongside Pulkit Samrat. Kharbanda has over 8.3 million Instagram followers and is widely known for her fashion style.

== Filmography ==
Key
†	Denotes films that have not yet been released

=== Films ===
List of Kriti Kharbanda film credits
Year	Title	Role	Language	Notes	Ref.
2009	Boni	Pragathi	Telugu		
2010	Chirru	Madhu	Kannada		
2011	Ala Modalaindi	Simran	Telugu	Cameo	
2011	Teen Maar	Vasumathi	Telugu		
2012	Mr. Nookayya	Anuradha "Anu"	Telugu		
2012	Prem Adda	Girija	Kannada		
2013	Galaate	Ankitha	Kannada		
2013	Ongole Gittha	Sandhya "Sandy"	Telugu		
2013	Om 3D	Anjali	Telugu		
2013	Googly	Dr. Swathi	Kannada		
2014	Tirupathi Express	Prarthana	Kannada		
2014	Super Ranga	Naina	Kannada		
2014	Belli	Sneha	Kannada		
2015	Minchagi Nee Baralu	Priyanka	Kannada		
2015	Bruce Lee: The Fighter	Kavya Rao	Telugu		
2016	Raaz: Reboot	Shaina Khanna	Hindi		
2017	Bruce Lee	Saroja Devi	Tamil		
2017	Maasthi Gudi	Raani	Kannada		
2017	Guest iin London	Anaya Patel Shergill	Hindi		
2017	Shaadi Mein Zaroor Aana	Aarti Shukla PCS	Hindi		
2018	Karwaan	Rumana Salim	Hindi	Cameo	
2018	Dalapathi	Vaidhehi	Kannada		
2018	Veerey Ki Wedding	Geet Bhalla	Hindi		
2018	Yamla Pagla Deewana: Phir Se	Dr. Chiku	Hindi		
2019	Housefull 4	Rajkumari Meena and Neha Thakral	Hindi	Dual role	
2019	Pagalpanti	Janhvi Singh	Hindi		
2020	Taish	Aarfa Khan	Hindi		
2021	14 Phere	Aditi "Adu" Karwasra	Hindi		
TBA	Risky Romeo †	TBA	Hindi	Completed	

=== Television ===
List of Kriti Kharbanda television credits
Year	Title	Role	Notes	Ref.
2011	Celebrity Cricket League	Herself		
2014	Bigg Boss Kannada 2	Herself	Weekend Guest	
2025	Rana Naidu	Alia Oberoi	Season 2	

== Accolades ==
List of Kriti Kharbanda awards and nominations
Year	Award	Category	Work	Result	Ref.
2014	South Indian International Movie Awards	Best Actress – Kannada	Googly	Nominated	
2015	Filmfare Awards South	Best Actress – Kannada	Super Ranga	Nominated	
2015	South Indian International Movie Awards	Best Actress – Kannada	Super Ranga	Nominated	
2015	South Indian International Movie Awards	Best Actress Critics – Kannada	Super Ranga	Won	
2016	Filmfare Awards South	Best Supporting Actress – Telugu	Bruce Lee: The Fighter	Nominated	
2016	South Indian International Movie Awards	Best Supporting Actress – Telugu	Bruce Lee: The Fighter	Nominated	
2019	Lokmat Stylish Awards	Most Stylish Rising Star	—N/a	Won	
2020	Lions Gold Awards	Best Actress in a Comic Role	Housefull 4	Won	
2022	Indian Television Academy Awards	Most Popular Actress – OTT	Taish	Nominated	
