= Veerey Ki Wedding =

2018 Indian film by Ashu Trikha

- Directed by: Ashu Trikha
- Screenplay by: Dilip Shukla
- Story by: Deepa Bakshi
- Produced by: Rajat Bakshi; Pramod Gomber
- Starring: Pulkit Samrat; Kriti Kharbanda; Jimmy Sheirgill; Chandan Bakshi
- Cinematography: Johny Lal
- Edited by: Devendra Murdeshwar
- Music by: Score: Sanjoy Chowdhury; Songs: Meet Bros; Jaidev Kumar; Ashok Punjabi; Farzan Faaiz
- Production company: Make My Day Entertainments
- Distributed by: Panorama Studios
- Release date: 2 March 2018
- Running time: 122 minutes
- Country: India
- Language: Hindi

Veerey Ki Wedding (transl. Veer's wedding) is a 2018 Indian Hindi-language romantic comedy directed by Ashu Trikha, starring Pulkit Samrat as the titular character, Kriti Kharbanda, and Jimmy Sheirgill. It was released on 2 March 2018.

== Cast ==
- Pulkit Samrat as Veer Arora (Veerey)
- Kriti Kharbanda as Geet Bhalla
- Jimmy Sheirgill as Balli Arora
- Satish Kaushik as Gopi Bhalla
- Yuvika Chaudhary as Inspector Rani Chaudhary
- Payal Rajput as Rinki Vohra
- Supriya Karnik as Juhi Bhalla
- Priyanka Nayan as Riya
- Vidyadhar Karmakar as Bade Babu Ji
- Sapna Choudhary as a dancer in the item number "Hatt Ja Tau Pache Ne"
- Mohd Sharia

== Soundtrack ==
Veerey Ki Wedding

Soundtrack album by Meet Bros, Farzan Faaiz, Jaidev Kumar and Ashok Punjabi
- Released: 27 February 2018
- Genre: Feature film soundtrack
- Length: 19:15
- Language: Hindi
- Label: T-Series

Meet Bros chronology
| Judwaa 2 (2017) | Veerey Ki Wedding (2018) | Welcome to New York (2018) |

Singles from Veerey Ki Wedding
- 1. "Mind Blowing" Released: 9 February 2018; 2. "Hatt Ja Tau" Released: 15 February 2018; 3. "Veerey Ki Wedding (Title Track)" Released: 21 February 2018; 4. "Talli Tonight" Released: 27 February 2018

The music of the film is composed by Meet Bros, Farzan Faaiz, Jaidev Kumar and Ashok Punjabi while lyrics are penned by Kumaar, Faaiz Anwar, Chandan Bakshi, Deepak Noor, Dr. Devendra Kafir, Ramkesh Jiwanpurwala and Ashok Punjabi. The background music of the film is composed by Sanjoy Chowdhury. The songs featured in the film are sung by Mika Singh, Sunidhi Chauhan, Navraj Hans, Saloni Thakkar, Meet Bros, Neha Kakkar, Deep Money, Javed Ali and Akanksha Bhandari. The first track of the film Mind Blowing which is sung by Mika Singh was released on 9 February 2018. The second song of the film to be released was Hatt Ja Tau which is sung by Sunidhi Chauhan was released on 15 February 2018. The third song of the film, Veerey Ki Wedding (Title Track) which is sung by Navraj Hans and Saloni Thakkar was released on 21 February 2018. The fourth track, Talli Tonight which is sung by Meet Bros, Neha Kakkar and Deep Money was released on 27 February 2018. The soundtrack was released on 27 February 2018 by T-Series.

Track listing
| No. | Title | Lyrics | Music | Singer(s) | Length |
|---|---|---|---|---|---|
| 1. | "Mind Blowing" | Deepak Noor, Chandan Bakshi | Farzan Faaiz | Mika Singh | 3:40 |
| 2. | "Hatt Ja Tau" | Dr. Devendra Kafir, Ramkesh Jiwanpurwala, Chandan Bakshi | Jaidev Kumar | Sunidhi Chauhan | 3:52 |
| 3. | "Veerey Ki Wedding" (Title Track) | Ashok Punjabi, Chandan Bakshi | Ashok Punjabi | Navraj Hans, Saloni Thakkar | 3:25 |
| 4. | "Talli Tonight" | Kumaar | Meet Bros | Meet Bros, Neha Kakkar, Deep Money | 3:44 |
| 5. | "Na Kasoor" | Faaiz Anwar | Farzan Faaiz | Javed Ali, Akanksha Bhandari | 4:34 |
| Total length: | | | | | 19:15 |

== Controversies ==
On 19 February 2018, Haryanvi singer Vikas Kumar sent a legal notice to the makers over copyright issues for the song "Hatt Ja Tau". Vikas has claimed that he has originally sung the number and the makers did not seek prior permission before using it in the film. Kumar's lawyer has stated that the makers cannot use the song without his permission and will have to pay him Rs 7 crore.

Veerey Ki Wedding is also in the news for its clash with Sonam Kapoor-Kareena Kapoor Khan starrer Veere Di Wedding's title. Mumbai High Court ruled in the favour of the makers of Veerey Ki Wedding.
