= Sumit Suri =

Indian actor and producer (born 1981)

- Born: Sumit Suri; 14 December 1981 (age 44); Rishikesh, Uttrakhand, India
- Occupation: ACTOR
- Years active: 2013-present
- Spouse: Surbhi Jyoti (m. 2024)

Sumit Suri (born 14 December 1981) is an Indian actor and producer who primarily works in Hindi films and series. Suri made his acting debut with the film Warning (2013) and is known for his role in Surkhaab (2015), A Billion Colour Story (2016) and 14 Phere (2021). In 2019, he started his production house, Good Hands Films.

== Personal life ==
Suri married his long time girlfriend, actress Surbhi Jyoti on 27 October 2024 in a traditional Hindu wedding ceremony at the Jim Corbett Resorts, Uttarakhand.

== Filmography ==
=== Films ===
Year	Title	Role	Notes	Ref.
2013	Warning	Aman Puri		
2013	What the Fish	Sumit		
2014	Babloo Happy Hai	Harry		
2015	Surkhaab	Kuldeep	Won–NIFF for Best Actor	
2016	A Billion Colour Story	Vishal		
2020	A Game Called Relationship	Sumit		
2021	14 Phere	Vivek Karwasra		

=== Television ===
Year	Title	Role	Notes	Ref.
2011	Fear Factor: Khatron Ke Khiladi 4	Contestant	10th place	
2017-2018	The Test Case	Captain Ranjit Surjewal		
2018	Home	Karan Bajaj		

=== Music video ===
Year	Title	Singer(s)	Ref.
2018	Haanji	Rabbit Sack, K9 and Shrooodi	
