= Pagalpanti (2019 film) =

2019 Indian film by Anees Bazmee

- Theatrical release poster
- Directed by: Anees Bazmee
- Written by: Story and Screenplay: Anees Bazmee; Rajiv Kaul; Praful Parekh; Dialogues: Anees Bazmee
- Produced by: Bhushan Kumar; Abhishek Pathak; Krishan Kumar; Kumar Mangat Pathak
- Starring: Anil Kapoor; John Abraham; Ileana D'Cruz; Arshad Warsi; Urvashi Rautela; Pulkit Samrat; Kriti Kharbanda; Saurabh Shukla; Inaamulhaq
- Cinematography: Sunil Patel
- Edited by: Prashant Singh Rathore
- Music by: Songs: Sajid–Wajid; Yo Yo Honey Singh; Tanishk Bagchi; Nayeem-Shabir; Score: Sajid–Wajid
- Production companies: T-Series; Panorama Studios
- Distributed by: Panorama Studios Distribution LLP; Anand Pandit Motion Pictures; Eros International
- Release date: 22 November 2019
- Running time: 149 minutes
- Country: India
- Language: Hindi
- Budget: ₹72 crore
- Box office: est. ₹49.17 crore

Pagalpanti (transl. Madness) is a 2019 Indian Hindi-language action comedy film directed by Anees Bazmee and produced by Bhushan Kumar and Krishan Kumar under the banner of T-Series along with Kumar Mangat Pathak and Abhishek Pathak under the banner of Panorama Studios. The film stars an ensemble cast of Anil Kapoor, John Abraham, Ileana D'Cruz, Arshad Warsi, , Pulkit Samrat, Kriti Kharbanda Urvashi Rautela, and Saurabh Shukla in the lead roles.

Principal photography of the film commenced on 17 February 2019 in London. It was theatrically released in India on 22 November 2019.

== Plot ==
Raj Kishore is plagued by bad luck, which also follows his longtime friends Jagmohan aka "Junky" and Chandrakanth alias "Chandu". Any venture the trio engage in results in losses or setbacks; even their fire-cracker shop burns down on its inaugural day. The trio fool Sanjana by making her fall in love with Raj and getting them a bank loan to start a new package delivery business. Having similarly been fooled by them before, her uncle catches wind of them and demands their money back. The trio escapes and inadvertently ends up making their first delivery: an expensive sports car for Janhvi, the daughter of a gangster Raja Sahab, and the niece of WiFi Bhai, Raja's brother-in-law. They deliver the car in a destroyed condition for which Raja Sahab and his goons torture them. They offer their services as servants, a suggestion which WiFi Bhai accepts; he convinces Raja Sahab to hire them against the wishes of their astrologer, who is aware of Kishore's lousy luck. They get employed as disposable servants; Junky and Chandu are used for testing food that Raja Sahab's and WiFi Bhai's enemies may have poisoned, while Raj serves as their decoy during travel. In the process, Chandu and Janhvi fall for each other.

During one of their traveling assignments, old enemies Tulli and Bulli Seth attack their convoy, revealing that WiFi Bhai is a coward. Fed up with their constant rivalry, businessman-turned-don Niraj Modi, who absconded India after taking huge loans, proposes to end their conflict by offering each party ₹700 crores to invest. By their continued stroke of lousy luck, Raj, Junky and Chandu end up causing a fire that burns the whole stack of money. In a bid to save what's left of their money, Raja Sahab and WiFi Bhai send the trio to bet on their lucky horse. They instead overhear a conversation about another horse and bet on it, which instead loses the race. Unable to pay Raja Sahab and WiFi Bhai, the trio escape with Janhvi and Sanjana and her uncle following them. The group ends up on a glue truck where Janhvi's lips get stuck to Chandu's cheeks, and Sanjana and her uncle get stuck on their backs. They arrive in an abandoned house where they meet Kavya, staying there posing as a ghost after facing rejection in her acting career. There, Raj accidentally discovers a basement where Niraj keeps his stockpiles of cash. The trio steals the money and arrives at Raja Sahab and WiFi Bhai's house just when they are about to be executed by Niraj for not paying them. They settle the money and buy out Niraj's properties.

Eventually, Niraj discovers that the trio pulled a fast one on him by stealing his own money to buy his properties. He arrives at Raja Sahab's house and threatens to kill them all. Raj reminds him that his money is not his own but stolen from India and Raj himself is an ex-employee of one of the banks Niraj took loans from and thus was one of many people who lost jobs because of Niraj. Raj also goads Niraj's henchmen into keeping the money for themselves. A skirmish ensues involving three escaped lions and concludes with detectives arriving to take Niraj into custody. Raj, Junky and Chandu reconcile their differences with Raja Sahab and WiFi Bhai. They live happily ever after.

== Cast ==
- Anil Kapoor as WiFi Bhai
- John Abraham as Raj Kishore
- Arshad Warsi as Jag "Junky" Mohan
- Pulkit Samrat as Chandra "Chandu" Kanth
- Ileana D'Cruz as Sanjana Paul
- Kriti Kharbanda as Janhvi Singh (Few lines as Mona Ghosh Shetty)
- Urvashi Rautela as Kavya Pratap
- Saurabh Shukla as Raja Singh aka Raja Saab
- Inaamulhaq as Niraj Modi (A character based on Nirav Modi)
- Zakhir Hussain as Tulli Seth
- Ashok Samarth as Bulli Seth
- Brijendra Kala as Mr. Paul aka Mama Ji
- Mukesh Tiwari as Baba Jani
- Dolly Bindra as Mrs. Singh, Raja Saab's wife
- Jameel Khan as Pandit Ji (Priest)
- Kanchan Pagare as Bad News Guy

== Production ==
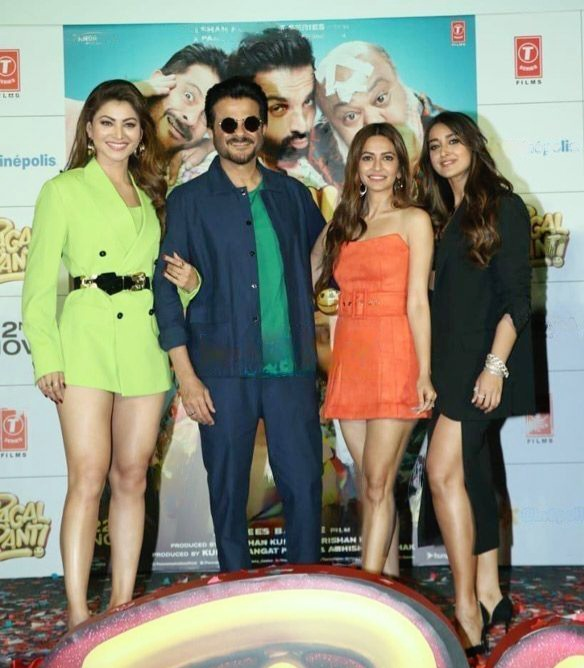
Urvashi Rautela, Anil Kapoor, Kriti Kharbanda and Ileana D'Cruz during trailer event of the film

=== Development ===
Pagalpanti was announced on 21 September 2018. In April 2019, Bazmee shared his experience of shooting in London. In a statement he said, "Shooting in London was not less than a roller-coaster ride. We had a few difficulties considering the weather conditions there."

=== Filming ===
Principal photography began in February 2019 in London. The London schedule lasted two months and ended in the final week of April 2019, wrapping up principal photography. John Abraham was injured while filming an action scene for the film in Mumbai. The production filmed scenes in Faversham, where Market Street doubled as a busy London market and Guild Hall was converted into a fireworks shop. The Historic Dockyard Chatham was used for a car chase scene along Slip 5, Museum Square, Ropery Street and Anchor Wharf.

== Marketing and release ==
Ahead of the release of the film a sequel has been planned. Kumar Mangat, the producer said "It is going to be a big franchise, and our team has started work on the script for part two...." The first teaser poster was released on 18 October 2019. On the same day the character posters of the ensemble cast were released.

The release date of the film was advanced and was released on 22 November 2019.

== Reception ==
Pagalpanti received generally negative reviews from critics.

Bollywood Hungama gave it 2.5 stars out of 5 and praised the background score, cinematography, production design and costumes but criticized the writing, direction, music and VFX. Ronak Kotecha from The Times of India gave it 3 stars out of 5, praising the action sequences and cinematography, writing, placement of songs and the characterization of heroines. Priyanka Sinha Jha from News18 gave the film 2 stars out of 5 and praised Arshad Warsi and Brijendra Kala but criticized the writing, heroines and clichéd humor. A reviewer from Times Now similarly gave it 2 stars out 5 and praised the performances, a few jokes, cinematography and production values. The criticism was aimed at the length, writing and editing. The Magic PR Gave It A 4 out of 5 praising songs, writing, the interval and said "johny par paisa laga do, Join the Pagalpanti gang for a full laughter riot."

Vinamra Mathur from Mid-Day gave the film 1.5 stars out of 5 and found it unintentionally funny. Sukanya Verma from Rediff.com gave it 1 star out of 5 and criticized the humor, VFX, labelled the script as a "stuff of pre-schooler dreams" and found the performances to be "better suited for a school play." Jyoti Sharma Bawa from Hindustan Times criticized the humor, writing, dialogues, music, heroines and forced patriotism.

== Soundtrack ==
Pagalpanti

Soundtrack album by Sajid–Wajid, Yo Yo Honey Singh, Tanishk Bagchi and Nayeem-Shabir
- Released: 21 November 2019
- Recorded: 2018–2019
- Genre: Feature film soundtrack
- Length: 17:44
- Language: Hindi
- Label: T-Series
External audio
- Official Audio Jukebox on YouTube

The music of the film is composed by Sajid–Wajid, Yo Yo Honey Singh, Tanishk Bagchi and Nayeem-Shabir, with lyrics written by Shabbir Ahmed, Arafat Mehmood, Yo Yo Honey Singh and Danish Sabri.

The song "Tum Par Hum Hai Aatke" from the film Pyaar Kiya To Darna Kya which was originally composed by Himesh Reshammiya, lyrics by Sudhakar Sharma and sung by Kumar Sanu and Kavita Krishnamurthy, was recreated by Tanishk Bagchi.

The song "Bimar Dil" from the film ChaalBaaz which was originally composed by Laxmikant–Pyarelal, lyrics by Anand Bakshi and sung by Mohammed Aziz and Kavita Krishnamurthy, was also recreated by Bagchi.

The title track, "Pagalpanti", composed by Sajid–Wajid, has its theme music sampled from the title track of Bazmee's 2007 film Welcome.

Track listing
No.	Title	Lyrics	Music	Singer(s)	Length
1.	"Tum Par Hum Hai Atke"	Shabbir Ahmed	Tanishk Bagchi	Mika Singh, Neha Kakkar	2:58
2.	"Walla Walla"	Arafat Mehmood	Nayeem-Shabir	Nakash Aziz, Neeti Mohan, Nayeem Shah	3:46
3.	"Thumka"	Yo Yo Honey Singh	Yo Yo Honey Singh	Yo Yo Honey Singh	2:50
4.	"Bimar Dil"	Shabbir Ahmed	Tanishk Bagchi	Jubin Nautiyal, Asees Kaur	5:00
5.	"Pagalpanti (Title Track)"	Danish Sabri	Sajid–Wajid	Sajid Khan, Ipsitaa, Rahul Kothari	3:10
Total length:					17:44

== Box office ==
Pagalpanti's opening day domestic collection was ₹4.75 crore. On the second day, the film collected ₹6.50 crore. On the third day, the film collected ₹8.25 crore, taking total opening weekend collection to ₹19.50 crore.

As of 23 December 2019, with a gross of ₹39.3 crore in India and ₹9.87 crore overseas, the film has a worldwide gross collection of ₹49.17 crore.
