= Heer and Hero =

Heer & Hero
- Directed by: Sagar S Sharma
- Written by: Rajan Agarwal
- Produced by: Harjeet Bhullar; Etch-B
- Starring: Minissha Lamba; Aarya Babbar; Gurpreet Ghuggi; Preet Bhullar
- Cinematography: Tapan Vyas
- Edited by: Kuldip Mehan
- Music by: R.S.Mani
- Production companies: HB Productions; The Theatre Army Films
- Release date: 18 October 2013
- Country: India
- Language: Punjabi

Heer and Hero is a 2013 Indian Punjabi film directed by Sagar S Sharma. Heer and Hero is produced by Harjeet Bhullar and Etch-B, and stars Manissha Lamba, Aarya Babbar, Gurpreet Ghuggi, Preet Bhullar, Mukul Dev and Manoj Pahwa. The film also has a song titled 'Haule Haule', with Music Director Mukhtar Sahota, vocals of Ranjit Rana and lyrics by Yaadwinder Pamma.

== Plot ==
Heer and Hero is the story of three lovers and a girl. The girl is very career-oriented and tells these men that if one of them helps her to go to a foreign country for her dream project, she will choose him as her partner. The story goes on with the journey to reach the destination with these men.

== Cast ==
- Aarya Babbar as Fateh
- Manissha Lamba as Geet
- Preet Bhullar as Raj
- Gurpreet Ghuggi as Bhupinder 'Bhuppi' Singh
- Mukul Dev as Police Inspector
- Manoj Pahwa as Kochi Badmash
- Yograj Singh
- Hazel Keech as an item number "Lak Tunu Tunu"
- Milkha Singh

== Soundtrack ==
Heer and Hero

Soundtrack album by Gurmeet Singh & Mukhtar Sahota
- Released: 25 October 2013
- Genre: Feature film soundtrack
- Length: 29:09
- Language: Punjabi
- Label: Shemaroo
External audio
- Audio Jukebox on YouTube

The soundtrack of Heer and Hero consists of 9 songs composed by Gurmeet Singh & Mukhtar Sahota, the lyrics of which were written by Kumaar, Veet Baljit, Yadwinder Pamma, Jaggi Singh, Kala Nizampuri and Kunwar Juneja.

Tracklist
No.	Title	Lyrics	Music	Singer(s)	Length
1.	"Dil Naal Dil"	Kumaar	Gurmeet Singh	Sonu Nigam and Ankita Sachdev	03:57
2.	"Haule Haule"	Yadwinder Pamma	Mukhtar Sahota	Ranjit Rana	03:42
3.	"Heer N Hero"	Yadwinder Pamma	Gurmeet Singh	Geeta Zaildar	02:48
4.	"Heer N Hero" (Reprise)	Yadwinder Pamma	Gurmeet Singh	Gurmeet Singh	02:50
5.	"Heer Te Hero"	Veet Baljit	Gurmeet Singh	Lember Hussainpuri	02:33
6.	"Heeriye"	Jaggi Singh	Gurmeet Singh	Kamal Khan & Shweta Pandit	03:39
7.	"Hurray"	Kala Nizampuri	Gurmeet Singh	Etch B	02:59
8.	"Lak Tunu Tunu"	Kala Nizampuri	Gurmeet Singh	Miss Pooja & Master Saleem	02:50
9.	"Ullu Da Pathha"	Kunwar Juneja	Gurmeet Singh	Labh Janjua	04:04
Total length:					29:09
