= Rajnigandha Shekhawat =

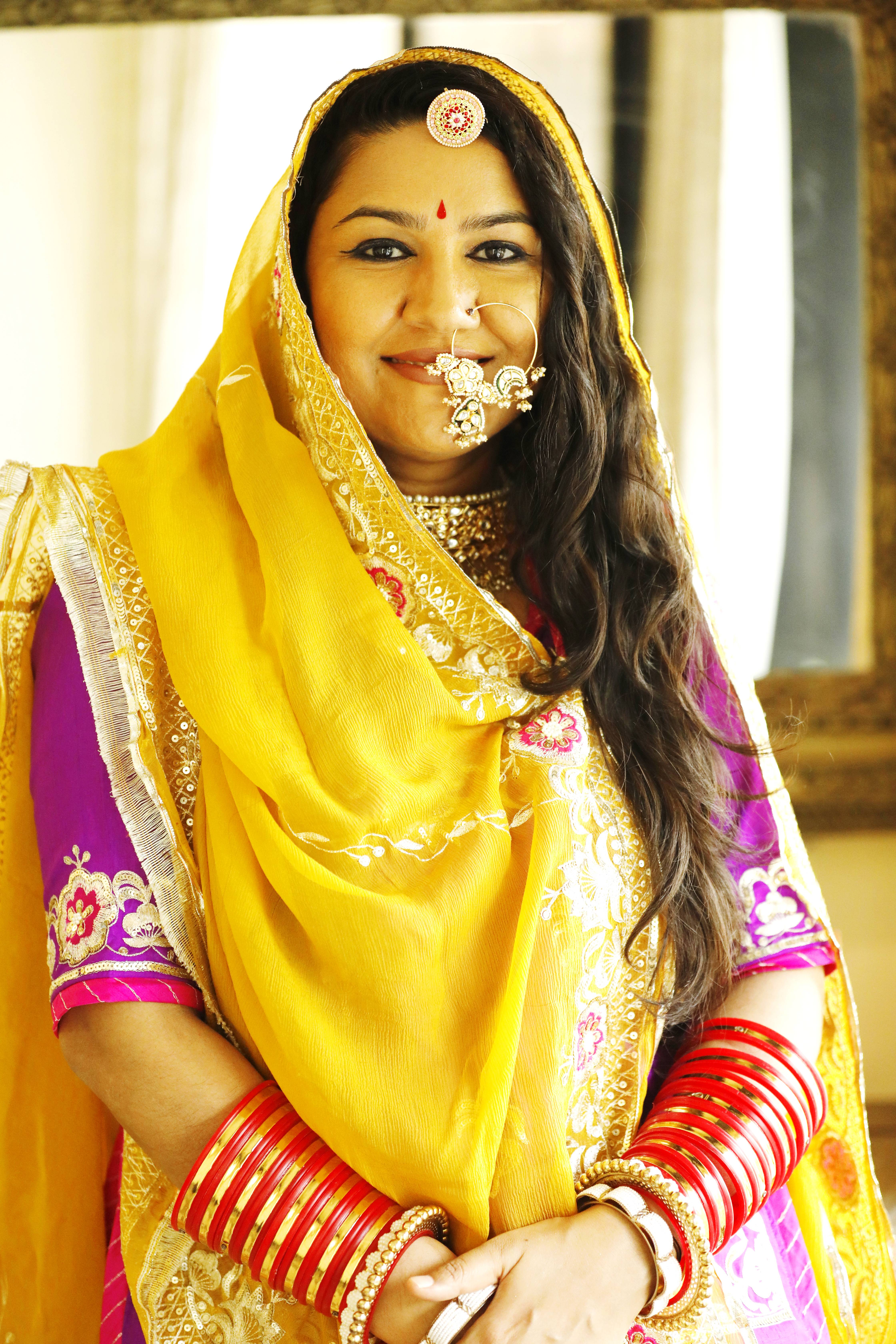
Rajnigandha Shekhawat

Rajnigandha Shekhawat is a singer from Rajasthan, India. She is known for singing Rajasthani folk, Bollywood, English and Rajasthani Marwari mashups, and vintage classics. and is the princess of the Thikana of Malsisar

== Background and personal life ==
Belonging to the erstwhile Aristocratic Noble family of Malsisar thikana (riyasat) of Shekhawati. She became the first singer from the traditional and conservative Rajput community of Rajasthan.

== Career ==
Rajnigandha Shekhawat is the only singer who does mashups of Rajasthani folk with English music, earning the title of "Maharani of Mashups" from the Rajasthani press. Her mashups of Cheap Thrills with Ghoomar shot her to fame. Many of her videos have become viral hits on Facebook videos, making her the most recognized face of fusion in Rajasthani music. Her subsequent mashups of Shape of You and Single Ladies with Rajasthani folk songs have also been popular. Her ability to sing western music alongside authentic Rajasthani folk songs makes her a unique artist, leading to her unique identity of being more than just a folk singer.

Rajnigandha has done playbacks in 8 films, her biggest song is Badri ki dulhania. She is also the voice of the immensely popular Red FM anthem “Bajaate Raho (Hook ho gaya hoon tere sound pe)”. Having released 3 albums and various singles and jingles for ad films, she regularly performs live in concerts and has over 500 concerts worldwide under her belt, including in Sun City, South Africa and Global Village Dubai & Muscat. She has also given her voice in various popular jingles.

Bollywood Marketing & Publicity :

Shekhawat has parallelly also been a Bollywood marketing professional, having led the publicity team at Disney India for Hindi and Hollywood films, Brand Head at Times Music (Times of India group) and has been associated with Hindi Film actors like Shahid Kapoor, Chunky Panday, Adah Sharma and more in a Publicity & Marketing Managerial capacity.

== Education ==
- Schooling from Maharani Gayatri Devi Girls Public School, Jaipur (MGD School).
- Visharad in Hindustani Classical Music from Maharaja Sawai Man Singh Sangeet Vidyalaya, Jaipur
- Masters in Hindustani Classical Music for SNDT University, Mumbai (Batch of 2014)

Rajnigandha was nominated for Mirchi Award for Most Promising New Singer in 2017 for the film Shubh Mangal Savdhan. She was recently invited to participate in the reality singing show Rising Star and also performed at the Bigg Boss finale. Rajnigandha's voice was also heard in a season of So You Think You Can Dance.

Trained in Hindustani Classical singing for over 20 years, she currently divides her time between touring for concerts, Bollywood playback songs, recording and shooting and her independent songs and their music video

== Discography - Movies Playback ==
Year	Song	Film / album
2013	"Tattoo"	Monsoon Shootout
2014	"Aai's Aalaap"	Margarita with a Straw
2017	"Badri Ki Dulhania (Title Track)"	Badrinath Ki Dulhania
2017	"Kankad"	Shubh Mangal Saavdhan
2021	"Aankh Mare"	Simmba
2021	"Laalam Laal"	Kaagaz
2021	"Shor Sharaba"	14 Phere
2021	"Aag Ka Dariya"	14 Phere
2022	"Badhaai Do Title Track"	Badhaai Do
	Satra juga mai - Ramdev ji	Laalji Kalandar
	Charkho Mharo	Laalji Kalandar

== Independent Songs ==
Year	Song	Album / Single
2007	Kevdo (Traditional)	Soul of the desert
2007	Kevdo (Hindi)	Soul of the desert
2007	Gudd Baanto	Soul of the desert
2007	Ghumar	Soul of the desert
2007	Moriya	Soul of the desert
2007	Ek Baar	Soul of the desert
2007	Mumal	Soul of the desert
2007	Kevdo (Hindi Remix)	Soul of the desert
2011	Banna Re	Banna Re
2011	Moriya	Banna Re
2011	Mangetar	Banna Re
2011	Levta Jajo ji Hivdo	Banna Re
2011	Chirmi	Banna Re
2011	Digipuri Ka Raja	Banna Re
2011	Kesaria Baalam	Banna Re
2014	Rangi Saari Gulabi	Gulabi
2014	Chhaap Tilak	Gulabi
2014	Piya Ghar Aya	Gulabi
2014	Zihaal E Miskin	Gulabi
2014	Whirling Ghoomar	Gulabi /Soul of the Desert
2014	Colour Kesaria	Gulabi /Soul of the Desert
2016	Gone Gone Song	TVS Tripling
2018	Bajaate Raho	Red FM song
2018	Garba superhits	Single
2018	Mehendi	Single
2018	Jawai Pavna	Single
2018	Bajudar Bangadi	Single
2021	Rajasthani Folk Medley	Single
2021	Gangaur	Single
2021	Mehala	
2023	Shri Krishna Govind	

== Mashups - Rajasthani with English or Hindi ==
Year	Mashup song name
2017	Cheap Thrils & Ghumar
2017	Jag Ghumiya & Ghudlo
2017	Single Ladies & Laal Peeli Ankhiyan
2017	Game of thrones Indian Classical version
2017	Despacito & Mai toh bhuli o alija
2018	Shape of you & Hichki
2019	Girls Like You & Leheriyo
2019	Paradise & Kurjaa
2022	Kesariya tera & Baisa re beera
2022	Rataa Lambiyan & Mor Bole Re

== Advertisements, TV, Jingles ==
Year	Ad song	Composer
2011	Fanta - Naughty Bubble	Amit Trivedi
2011	Chyavanprash - Dhoni	Amar Mangrulkar
2013	Ek Nayi Pehchan Promo	Micu Patel
2015	Rajasthan Tourism Logo Reveal	Rajat Dholakia, SamirUddin
2016	Jabong - Silent Diwali	Shubhojit
2016	Gone Gone Song - TVS Tripling	Amar Mangrulkar
2017	Vidai Promo - Ye rishta kya kehlata hai	Rajeev Bhalla
2017	Anmol Biscuits - Utterly Butterlyfull	Rajeev Bhalla
2017	Bajaj Platina	Abhishek Arora
2018	Red FM Bajaate Raho / Hook ho gaya	Tanishk Vayu
2018	Lenovo - Rewari to Mars	Shubhojit
2018	Mausam Music Ka - Indian Idol	Abhishek Arora

== Awards ==
- Nominated for Upcoming Female Vocalist at Mirchi Awards year 2017 for her song Kankad in the film Shubh Mangal Savdhan
- Best Female – Artist Aloud Award 2011
- Rajasthan Sangeet Ratna
- DNA Woman of Substance, Rajasthan
- Best Fusion Song award in the Non Film Music category at the Jaipur Music Festival awards 2017
