= Belli (film) =

- Directed by: Mussanje Mahesh
- Screenplay by: Mussanje Mahesh
- Story by: Mussanje Mahesh
- Produced by: H. R. Rajesh
- Starring: Shiva Rajkumar; Kriti Kharbanda; Vinod Prabhakar; Orata Prashanth; Shishya Deepak; Venkatesh Prasad
- Cinematography: K. S. Chandrashekar
- Edited by: Deepu S. Kumar
- Music by: V. Sridhar
- Production company: Yashaswini Cine Creations
- Distributed by: Dreamweaver Entertainment
- Release date: 31 October 2014
- Running time: 147 minutes
- Country: India
- Language: Kannada

Belli (translation: Silver) is a 2014 Indian Kannada action film written and directed by Mussanje Mahesh. It stars an ensemble cast featuring Shiva Rajkumar, Kriti Kharbanda, Vinod Prabhakar, Orata Prashanth, Shishya Deepak, Venkatesh Prasad, Sudha Rani, Aravinda Rao and Padma Vasanthi.

Produced by H. R. Rajesh, filming commenced in March 2014. The cinematography was done by K. S. Chandrashekar and was edited by Deepu S. Kumar. The soundtrack was composed by V. Sridhar.

Belli was released on 31 October 2014, where it received mixed reviews from critics and became an average venture at the box office.

== Premise ==
Basavaraj alias Belli (Shiva Rajkumar) migrates from his village to the city in search of a job, where he falls into the trap of the underworld under the leadership of a politician (Chi. Guru Dutt) and also meets his new friends Babu (Vinod Prabhakar), Ashwathnarayana Bhat (Shishya Deepak), Rafi (Venkatesh Prasad) and Srinivas (Orata Prashanth). In a clash between rival gangs, Belli's boss is killed and Belli is wounded due to an attack in his head, thus leaving him insane. Belli's friends feel guilty about his condition and leaves to start a new life. Despite his condition, Belli's memories recover in seconds/minutes where he sets out to avenge his boss' death.

== Cast ==
- Shiva Rajkumar as Basavaraj "Belli"
- Kriti Kharbanda as Sneha
- Vinod Prabhakar as Babu
- Orata Prashanth as Srinivas
- Shishya Deepak as Ashwathnarayana Bhat
- Venkatesh Prasad as Rafi
- Adi Lokesh as Tabli Manja
- Padma Vasanthi as Basavaraj's mother
- Sudha Rani as Nidhi
- Chi. Guru Dutt
- Srinivasa Murthy
- Ramesh Bhat as a doctor
- B. V. Radha
- Aravinda Rao as ACP Pradeep Kumar
- Harish Rai as "Snake" Mohammed
- Saurav Lokesh
- Nagaraj
- Honnavalli Krishna as Constable Krishna

== Production ==
Mussanje Mahesh returned to direction with Belli after a three-year hiatus. He wanted to cast Shiva Rajkumar in his film titled Maha Shivaratri which "unfortunately, ... got shelved". He later narrated the story of Belli which Shiva liked and signed to play the eponymous lead. Mahesh said that Shiva's character would be seen "in three shades". Vinod Prabhakar, Prashanth, Deepak and Venkatesh Prasad were cast to play parallel leads alongside Shiva. It was reported in March 2014 that Kriti Kharbanda would play the female lead opposite Shiva.

Filming began on 19 March 2014 in Bangalore. A few days prior to the release Mahesh revealed that Shiva portrays a "mentally unstable character" in the film.

== Reception ==
The film opened with average to negative reviews from critics who noted the plot's similarities to Shiva Rajkumar's films from the previous decade, including the cult classic Om (1995), and Jogi (2005).

== Soundtrack ==
The film's score and soundtrack were composed by V. Sridhar and the audio was created by Anand Audio. The audio was released on 28 September 2014 in the presence of the film's entire cast and crew. The event was held at a stadium in Bangalore. Minister D. K Shivakumar., also attended the event. The lyrics are written by Dr. Nagendra Prasad and Kaviraj.

No.	Title	Singer(s)	Length
1.	"Belli Belli"	Sadhana Sargam
2.	"Dhoom Dhamaka"	Shankar Mahadevan
3.	"Doona Doona"	Karthik, Supriya Lohith
4.	"Maleya Madayya"	Fayaz Khan, Bangalore Boys
5.	"Pungi Inda Bandare"	Sangeetha Ravindranath
6.	"Doona Doona"	Shashank Sheshagiri, Supriya Lohith
7.	"Belli Belli"	Supriya Lohith
