= Il Mare =

- Theatrical release poster
- Hangul: 시월애
- Hanja: 時越愛
- Lit.: time-transcending love
- RR: Siworae
- MR: Siwŏrae
- Directed by: Lee Hyun-seung
- Written by: Yeo Ji-na; Kim Eun-jung; Kim Mi-yeong; Won Tae-yeon
- Produced by: Cho Min-hwan; Cha Seung-jae
- Starring: Lee Jung-jae; Jun Ji-hyun
- Cinematography: Hong Kyung-pyo
- Edited by: Lee Eun-soo
- Music by: Kim Hyun-chul
- Distributed by: Blue Cinema; Dream Venture Capital; Sidus Pictures; UniKorea Pictures
- Release date: September 9, 2000 (South Korea)
- Running time: 96 minutes
- Country: South Korea
- Language: Korean
- Budget: US$2.5 million

Il Mare (Korean: 시월애; lit. 'time-transcending love') is a 2000 South Korean romantic fantasy film, starring Lee Jung-jae and Jun Ji-hyun, and directed by Lee Hyun-seung. The title, Il Mare, means "The Sea" in Italian, and is the name of the seaside house which is the setting of the story. The two protagonists both live there two years apart in time, but are able to communicate through a mysterious mailbox.

The film was remade in 2006 as The Lake House, starring Keanu Reeves and Sandra Bullock. The plot was also adapted into the 2015 Indian Kannada film Minchagi Nee Baralu.

== Plot ==
There are two distinct timelines intertwined throughout most of the film.

The story begins with Eun-joo moving out of a house called "Il Mare" by the sea. She leaves a Christmas card in the mailbox, asking the next resident to forward her mail to her. Sung-hyun, an architectural student, receives her card, but is puzzled since he is the first resident at Il Mare and the card is dated two years in the future. After a period of correspondence, Eun-joo and Sung-hyun realize they are living two years apart, Eun-joo in the year 1999 and Sung-hyun in the year 1997. After some tests, they discover that the mailbox at Il Mare is enabling their communication and they can pass objects and living creatures through it. Using the mailbox, Eun-joo asks Sung-hyun to retrieve a tape player she lost two years ago, which he does.

When his estranged father, a noted architect, falls ill, Sung-hyun asks Eun-joo to obtain a book about his father, which she does. However, she is hospitalized for a minor traffic accident and fails to get the book to Sung-hyun before his father's death. After reading the book, Sung-hyun finally accepts his father's love for him and takes up architectural work once more.

Eun-joo and Sung-hyun continue their correspondence and decide to try a date, with each participating in his or her own time. Eun-joo "takes" Sung-hyun to an amusement park, where he follows her instructions on how to have a good time. He "takes" her to a restaurant, where she drinks a bottle of wine he left two years prior. Despite having fun on these solo dates, they decide to try to meet in person at a beach two years in Sung-hyun's future.

Eun-joo goes to the beach, but Sung-hyun does not show up. She sees a house being built for an unknown architect's lover. Eun-joo tells Sung-hyun that he didn't come, and he is baffled as he doesn't think he would have forgotten such an important date. He makes a trip to the beach at which they had agreed to meet and is moved by its beauty. He decides to design a house there for her.

Eun-joo runs into her ex-fiance at her workplace. They were going to get married, but he moved abroad for work while she stayed in Korea. Due to the separation, they eventually broke up, and he married another person. Eun-joo, still in love with him, asks Sung-hyun to stop her fiance from leaving two years in the past. Sung-Hyun is heartbroken after receiving her letter and torn between his love and her request. After long contemplation, he decides against his own desires and agrees to help. He writes to Eun-joo, wishing her and her fiancé luck in the future.

After receiving the heartfelt reply from Sung-hyun, Eun-joo decides to visit his school. She finds the architecture department and is greeted by a friend of Sung-Hyun. Eun-joo asked for him, but learns that Sung-Hyun died in a traffic accident while meeting a friend two years ago. She realizes that on the day she last met her fiancé before they separated, she witnessed a car hitting and killing a pedestrian. Sung-hyun was the pedestrian, and the house being built at the beach was designed by him for her. She rushes to the mailbox and sends a letter begging him not to go.

The final scene returns to the beginning of the movie, where Eun-joo is about to place her Christmas card into the mailbox at Il Mare. A figure approaches her with a letter in hand, the letter that she sent warning Sung-hyun. Sung-hyun did receive her warning: he never went to intervene and was never hit by the car. Eun-joo and Sung-hyun finally meet.

== Cast ==
- Lee Jung-jae as Sung-hyun, a young man who was the first tenant of the house. Living two years in the past of 1997, he begins as a construction worker for a large project. Although a talented architect, Sung-hyun has become critical of his talents, claiming he could not stand becoming a hypocrite.
- Jun Ji-hyun as Eun-joo, a young woman who has aspirations of becoming a voice actress. Throughout the film, we see that although she has obtained her dream, there is something missing in her life. Living in 1999, Eun-joo becomes the second tenant of the house and is only moving out as the film begins.
- Kim Mu-saeng
- Jo Seung-yeon as Jae-hyuk
- Min Yun-jae
- Kim Ji-mu
- Choi Yoon-yeong
- Lee In-chul
- Kwon Yeon-gyeong

== Location ==
The setting for the movie was shot on Ganghwa Island's Sukmodo, and Jeju Province's Udo.

== Reception ==
This time-travel romance was not a popular success in 2000, selling less than a quarter million tickets in Seoul (upstaged by not only the similar-themed Ditto, but also the controversial Lies), but since then it has developed a loyal fan base a la Somewhere in Time and attained the status of a minor classic among Korean cinema fans.

== Remake ==
Warner Brothers acquired the rights for an American remake, titled The Lake House, starring Keanu Reeves and Sandra Bullock. It was released on June 16, 2006 and was co-produced by Sonny Mallhi, Amit Walia, and Chris Krapek. To reference the original movie, "Il Mare" was used as the restaurant's name where Kate and Alex are supposed to meet.

It was adapted into the Indian Kannada-language film Minchagi Nee Baralu (2015). The Telugu film Adbhutham (2021) was inspired by Minchagi Nee Baralu. Tu Hai Meri Kiran (2026) is a loose Hindi remake.
