= Minchagi Nee Baralu =

- Directed by: Randeep Shantharam Mahadik
- Written by: Randeep Shantharam Mahadik
- Screenplay by: Randeep Shantharam Mahadik
- Produced by: Maahesh Kumar Jaiswal; Randeep Shantharam Mahadik; Mahesh Talakadu
- Starring: Diganth; Kriti Kharbanda
- Cinematography: Mahesh Talakadu
- Edited by: K. Girish Kumar
- Music by: V. Harikrishna
- Production companies: Strawberry Entertainment Pvt. Ltd; Keemaya Productions Pvt. Ltd
- Release date: 4 December 2015
- Running time: 130 minutes
- Country: India
- Language: Kannada

Minchagi Nee Baralu is a 2015 Indian Kannada romantic science fiction film written, directed and co-produced by Randeep Shantharam Mahadik, in his directorial debut. It stars Diganth and Kriti Kharbanda in the lead roles. The film has musical score composed by V. Harikrishna. Although launched in 2013, the film underwent several delays and finally announced the release date as 4 December 2015. The plot of the film is based on the 2000 South Korean film Il Mare.

== Cast ==
- Diganth as Jai
- Kriti Kharbanda as Priyanka
- Dilip Raj
- Ramesh Bhat
- Sihi Kahi Chandru
- Archana

== Production ==
A first time director Randeep Shantharam, former assistant to the Bollywood director Rajkumar Santoshi, had intention of making the film in Hindi with Ranbir Kapoor and Priyanka Chopra in the lead roles. However the plan had to be dropped due to the reported reasons. One of the producers, Mahesh Talakad, suggested him to do the same film in Kannada with a fresh lead pair and that worked out after the lead actors were finalized. The film's initial title Minchagi Neenu Baralu was picked from a song of the film Gaalipata (2008) which also had Diganth as one of the lead protagonists.

== Soundtrack ==
The audio of the film, composed by V. Harikrishna was officially released on 12 September 2015 at the Bangalore Citadel hotel. D-beats audio company took up the distribution rights of the audio. A total of four songs have been composed by Harikrishna to the lyrics of A. P. Arjun.

=== Track listing ===
No.	Title	Lyrics	Singer(s)	Length
1.	"Aakasha Kaalkelage"	Kaviraj	Santhosh Venky
2.	"Gundige Olage"	A. P. Arjun	Tippu
3.	"Kelho Haage"	Kaviraj	Tippu
4.	"Thili Gaali"	Kaviraj	Santhosh Venky

== Reception ==
A critic from The Times of India rated the film three out of five and wrote that "the love story actually has novelty for the Kannada audience and is a welcome break from the usual underworld and massy films with an action overload. Go watch this with your special someone".
