= Sartaj Singh Pannu =

Indian filmmaker

- Occupations: director, screenwriter, producer

Sartaj Singh Pannu is an Indian filmmaker known for directing the multiple National Film Awards winning films. (Nanak Shah Fakir)

== Early life ==
Pannu was born in Punjab and was sent to study at St Georges’ College, Mussoorie.

== Career ==
Pannu's debut film as a director and actor is Soch Lo, which also featured him as the lead actor, He has since made the Punjabi film Tiger, starring Sippy Gill and another Hindi language film, Om.

== Filmography ==
- Soch Lo (2010)
- Tiger (2016) (Punjabi film)
- Om (Hindi film)
- Nanak Shah Fakir (2014) (Hindi film)
