= Hazel Keech =

British actress and model (born 1987)

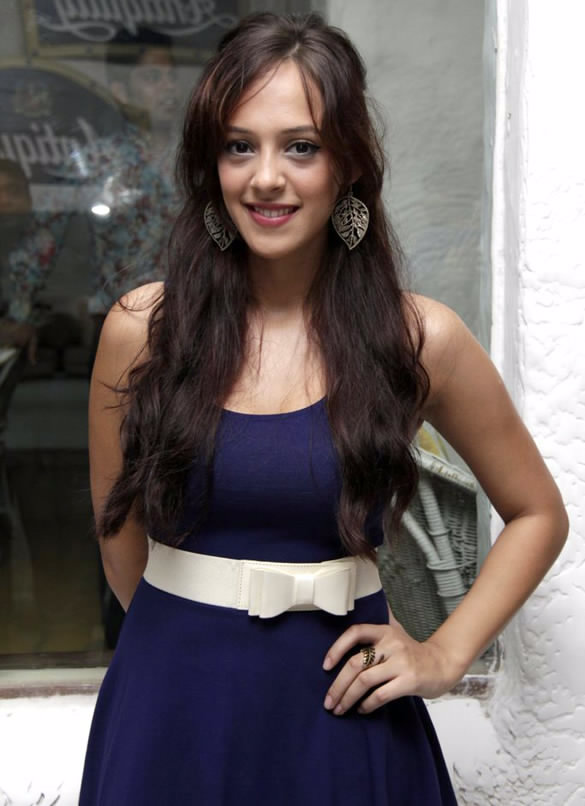
- Keech in May 2012
- Born: 28 February 1987 (age 39); Essex, England, United Kingdom
- Other names: Rose Dawn, Gurbasant Kaur
- Occupations: Model; actress
- Years active: 2007–2016
- Spouse: Yuvraj Singh (m. 2016)
- Children: 2
- Relatives: Yograj Singh (father-in-law)

Hazel Keech (born 28 February 1987), also known by her modelling name Rose Dawn and married name Gurbasant Kaur, is a British actress and model who has appeared in Indian films and television. She has appeared in Billa and Bodyguard as well as in a Suzuki advertisement. She danced in the Frankfinn Music remix item number "Kahin Pe Nigahaen". She appeared in the reality television programme Bigg Boss 7 in 2013.

== Early life ==
Keech was born on 28 February 1987 in Essex, England, to a British father and an Indo-Mauritian Hindu mother with ancestry from the Bihar-Uttar Pradesh region. She did her schooling at Beal High School in Redbridge, London, where she performed in stage shows and learned various forms of dance including Indian classical dance, English dance and western contemporary.

== Career ==
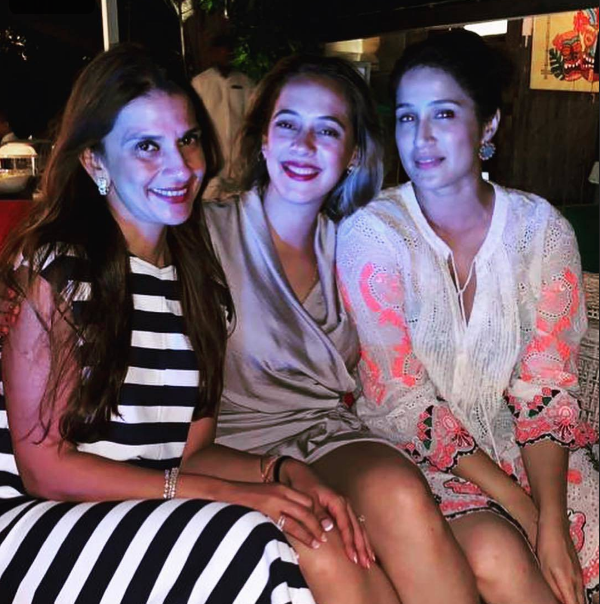
Hazel with Sagarika Ghatge and Fatema Agarkar

Keech became involved in television, film and stage. She danced in the British programme Agatha Christie's Marple. The BBC documentary show Call The Shots showed her working in Hindi films. She joined the team of the Bollywood musical Bombay Dreams for their London promotional tour in 2002 and sang in the choir of the West End musical Joseph and the Amazing Technicolor Dreamcoat the following year. She was an extra in several of the Harry Potter films.

In 2005, while holidaying in Mumbai, she received work offers and decided to stay and pursue a modelling and acting career in India. The first modelling company she worked with changed her name to Rose Dawn. She then worked in various music videos as "Kahin Pe Nigahen" as well as many TV commercials, such as Vivel by ITC, and the Sprite 'University of Freshology' commercial. In 2007, Keech appeared in the 2007 Tamil film Billa, where she performed an item number in the song "Sei Ethavathu". In 2011, she played a supporting role in the Hindi film Bodyguard produced by Atul Agnihotri and directed by Siddique. She also performed an item number titled "Aa Ante Amlapuram" in the film Maximum. She performed a song, "Chal Chal Chal", in the film Krishnam Vande Jagadgurum (2012). In August 2013, she appeared as a guest contestant in Jhalak Dikhhla Jaa 6 for the Teen Ka Tadka special opposite singer Shaan Mukherjee (who was a contestant on the show) and his choreographer Maricsha Fernandez.

In September 2013, Keech appeared in the reality show, Bigg Boss 7. She spent a week in the house before getting eliminated and became the first contestant to exit the house. In an interview after her eviction she expressed her anger about Pratyusha Banerjee, saying, "She likes to create problems".

In October 2013, after leaving the Bigg Boss house, Keech appeared on a Punjabi film titled Heer and Hero in an item number.

== Filmography ==
=== Films ===
Year	Film	Role	Language
2002	Harry Potter and the Chamber of Secrets	Extra	English
2004	Harry Potter and the Prisoner of Azkaban	Extra	English
2005	Harry Potter and the Goblet of Fire	Extra	English
2007	Billa	Rhea	Tamil
2009	Kick	Item number	Telugu
2011	Bodyguard	Maya Kapoor	Hindi
2012	Maximum	Item number	Hindi
2012	Krishnam Vande Jagadgurum	Item number	Telugu
2013	Heer and Hero	Item number	Punjabi
2015	Dharam Sankat Mein	Item number	Hindi
2015	Baankey Ki Crazy Baraat	Item number	Hindi

=== Television ===
Year	Name	Role	Notes	Ref(s)
2012	Comedy Circus	Contestant	Along with Krushna Abhishek	
2013	Jhalak Dikhhla Jaa 6	Contestant	Teen Ka Tadka Appearance	
2013	Bigg Boss 7	Contestant	Evicted Day 7	

== Personal life ==
On 12 November 2015, Keech got engaged to Indian cricketer Yuvraj Singh. They were married on 30 November 2016. After marriage, Hazel adopted the name "Gurbasant Kaur", which was given to her by Sant Balvinder Singh during the wedding ceremony. The couple had their first child, a boy named Orion, on 25 January 2022. Their second child, a girl named Aura was born on 17 July 2023.

Keech admitted in an interview that she survived severe depression and was suicidal in her time in India, and so she took up diploma to learn Psychotherapy to help others like her.
