= 14 Phere =

2021 Indian film by Devanshu Singh

- Release poster
- Directed by: Devanshu Singh
- Written by: Manoj Kalwani
- Produced by: Zee Studios
- Starring: Vikrant Massey; Kriti Kharbanda
- Cinematography: Riju Das
- Edited by: Manan Ajay Sagar
- Music by: Raajeev V. Bhalla; JAM8
- Production company: Zee Studios
- Distributed by: ZEE5
- Release date: 23 July 2021
- Running time: 111 minutes
- Country: India
- Language: Hindi

14 Phere (transl. 14 rounds) (Note: The title is a play on the "saat phere" wedding ritual.) is a 2021 Indian Hindi-language romantic comedy film directed by Devanshu Singh and produced by Zee Studios. The film stars Vikrant Massey and Kriti Kharbanda. It premiered on 23 July 2021 on ZEE5 to mixed to positive reviews.

== Plot ==
Sanjay Lal Singh and Aditi Karwasra, two individuals belonging to different castes, fall in love and wish to get married. However, knowing their parents will disapprove, they hatch a plan to convince them.

== Cast ==
- Vikrant Massey as Sanjay "Sanju" Lal Singh
- Kriti Kharbanda as Aditi "Adu" Karwasra
- Gauahar Khan as Zubina
- Jameel Khan as Amay
- Yamini Das as Sarla Lal Singh
- Vineet Kumar as Kanhaiya Lal Singh
- Priyanshu Singh as Chhotu Singh
- Manoj Bakshi as Banwari Mama
- Govind Pandey as Dharampal Karwasra
- Sumit Suri as Vivek Karwasra
- Sonakshi Batra as Sneha Karwasra
- Bhupesh Singh as Jayant Mishra
- Kritika Pande as Rashmi
- Geet Sagar as Anuj Mathur, Aditi and Sanjay's boss
- Shivani Shivpuri as Mrs Gupta

== Production ==
Vikrant Massey and Kriti Kharbanda were cast as an inter-caste couple, in their first collaboration. The principal photography commenced in Mumbai on 26 November 2020, and the film was also shot in Delhi, Jaipur and Lucknow. Filming was wrapped up in January 2021.

== Reception ==
Shubhra Gupta of The Indian Express gave the film 1.5 out of 5 stars and stated, "Between the long-drawn, wholly preposterous idea of fake ‘baraatis’, and two ‘shaadis’, there's just confusion in this Vikrant Massey-Kriti Kharbanda film." Saibal Chatterjee of NDTV gave the film 1.5 out of 5 stars and stated, "Notwithstanding the serviceable chemistry between the lead actors and a few performances from the supporting cast, the film goes around in circles." Rahul Desai of Film Companion gave the film a negative review and stated that the film "loses its spirit and identity" and is "half-funny, half-serious And fully confused".

Stutee Ghosh of The Quint gave the film a mixed review and stated, "Given that the humour is pretty flat, the narrative would have benefited with some intense emotional moments and by showing some spine and vision. It almost feels like the message is that as long as one can show off an ostentatious display of wealth and dowry, one can hush up about caste- a rather problematic resolution!" Anita Aikara of Rediff.com gave the film 2.5 out of 5 stars and stated, "14 Phere delivers on the feel-good factor, but if you are looking for ground-breaking humour, it will fail to work its way into your hearts." Nandini Ramnath of Scroll gave the film a negative review and criticized the screenplay, performance, the leads, but praised Jameel Khan's performance.

== Soundtrack ==
14 Phere

Soundtrack album by Raajeev V. Bhalla and JAM8
- Released: 20 July 2021
- Recorded: 2020
- Genre: Feature film soundtrack
- Length: 27:46
- Language: Hindi
- Label: Zee Music Company

Official audio
- 14 Phere – Full Album on YouTube

The music of the film was composed by Rajeev V Bhalla and JAM8 while the lyrics were written by Rajeev. V. Bhalla, Pallavi Mahajan, Geet Sagar, and Shloke Lal.

Track listing
No.	Title	Lyrics	Singer(s)	Length
1.	"Hum Dono Yun Mile"	Raajeev V. Bhalla	Raajeev V. Bhalla, Riya Duggal, Rashi Harmalkar	3:36
2.	"Chamak"	Raajeev V. Bhalla	Raajeev V. Bhalla, Sharvi Yadav, Pinky Maidasani	3:12
3.	"Ghodi Chadhke"	Pallavi Mahajan	Raajeev V. Bhalla, Rekha Bhardwaj, Keka Ghoshal, Ravi Mishra	3:19
4.	"Aag Ka Dariya"	Geet Sagar	Raajeev V. Bhalla, Romy, Rajnigandha Shekhawat	3:31
5.	"Hai Tu"	Geet Sagar	Raajeev V. Bhalla, Himani Kapoor, Sarvpreet Singh	5:15
6.	"Shor Sharaba"	Shloke Lal	Raajeev V. Bhalla, Brijesh Shandilya, Rajnigandha Shekhawat, Shloke Lal	3:19
7.	"Ram Sita" (Music: Mukund Suryavanshi for JAM8)	Shloke Lal	Rekha Bhardwaj	5:34
Total length:				27:46

== See also ==
- Saat phere (seven rounds)
- Saptapadi (seven steps)
