= Vidyadhar Karmakar =

Indian actor (1925–2021)

Vidyadhar Karmakar (1925 – 20 September 2021) was an Indian stage, film and television actor. He played in many advertisements from 2006 on.

== Career ==
Vidyadhar retired from the Central Telegraph office in 1984. Before he started modelling in ads he was known face in Marathi theatre. He acted in and also directed plays. In addition he was a puppeteer.

== Filmography ==
=== Films ===
Year	Title	Role	Notes
2008	Saas Bahu Aur Sensex	Mr. Pawar	
2010	Karthik Calling Karthik	Old Man at Ticket Counter	
2013	Ek Thi Daayan	Old Man	
2014	Ek Villain	Chotu	
2016	Great Grand Masti	Dada in the Car	
2017	Tumhari Sulu	Mathuradas Brother 2	
2018	Veerey Ki Wedding	Bade Babu ji	

=== Television ===
Year	Title	Role	Notes
2015	Dosti... Yaariyan... Manmarziyan	Suraj Mishra	

== Links ==
- Vidyadhar Karmarkar is the oldest actor on Indian television
- Vidyadhar Karmakar at IMDb
