= Chirru =

- Film poster
- Directed by: Mahesh Babu
- Written by: Swamiji
- Produced by: Suresh Jain
- Starring: Chiranjeevi Sarja; Kriti Kharbanda
- Cinematography: Sundarnath Suvarna
- Edited by: Sri Crazy Mindz
- Music by: Giridhar Diwan
- Production company: Mars Films
- Release date: 19 November 2010
- Running time: 139 minutes
- Country: India
- Language: Kannada

Chirru is a 2010 Indian Kannada-language romantic action film directed by Mahesh Babu and written by Swamiji. The film stars Chiranjeevi Sarja and Kriti Kharbanda (in her Kannada film debut), in leading roles whilst Kiran Srinivas plays a brief supporting role. The film was released across Karnataka cinemas on 19 November 2010 to average and mixed response.

== Plot ==
Chiru is an unemployed guy, who arrives in Bangalore for a job interview. One day, he falls in love with Madhu, the daughter of state's Home Minister Rajasekhar, but later learns that she is in love with Dilip, an IAS aspirant. Dilip and Madhu decide to elope, where Chiru also helps them. Rajasekhar mistakes Chiru to be Madhu's boyfriend and dispatches goons to kill him. However, Chiru clears the misunderstanding and Rajasekhar accepts Dilip and Madhu's marriage, and Chiru brings them back to Rajasekhar. Later, Chiru realizes that he misses Madhu, and decide to leave for his hometown. Madhu also realizes her love for Chiru, and reveals it to her mother. She ask Madhu to elope with Chiru, but Madhu refuses as she has already made her father feel ashamed and will not repeat the same mistake again. Rajasekhar overhears their conversation, and has a change of heart, where he reunites Chiru and Madhu.

== Cast ==
- Chiranjeevi Sarja as Chiru
- Kriti Kharbanda as Madhu
- Kiran Srinivas as Dilip
- MG Srinivas as Srini
- Rangayana Raghu as Rajasekhar, Madhu's father
- Bullet Prakash
- Padma Vasanthi
- P. N. Sathya
- Cool Chinna
- Umesh Punga
- Mahesh Babu
- Kuruba Gowda

== Soundtrack ==
The music was composed by Giridhar Diwan for Jhankar music company.

Track listing
No.	Title	Lyrics	Singer(s)	Length
1.	"Shambo Shiva Shankara"	Ram Narayan	Udit Narayan
2.	"Ninna Kannalide"	Jayanth Kaikini	Sonu Nigam
3.	"Oo Lalala"	Ram Narayan	Kunal Ganjawala, Shweta Pandit
4.	"Olavanu Helu"	Mahesh Babu	Udit Narayan, Anuradha Bhat
5.	"Ille Ille Ello"	Ghouse Peer	Sonu Nigam, Shreya Ghoshal

== Reception ==
=== Critical response ===
The Times of India gave 3.5/5 stars and wrote "A romantic story with interesting turns and twists". Shruti Indira Lakshminarayana of Rediff gave 1.5/5 stars and says "Watch Chiru if you have nothing else planned for the weekend". Bangalore Mirror wrote "A potpourri of at least half-a-dozen films, Chirru does weave some magic, but falls short of being bracketed as a must-see film". B. S Srivani from Deccan Herald wrote "This Chirru makes all the right noises. Worth watching". The New Indian Express wrote "Babu has given more importance to astrology than the performance of artistes in Chiru".
