= Surkhaab =

- Poster
- Directed by: Sanjay Talreja
- Produced by: Vivek Kumar; Barkha Madan
- Starring: Barkha Madan; Sumit Suri; Vineeta Malik
- Cinematography: Ben Lichty
- Edited by: Archit D Rastogi
- Release date: 24 April 2015
- Running time: 100 minutes
- Countries: India; Canada
- Language: Hindi

Surkhaab is a Hindi-language film directed by Sanjay Talreja. The film, an Indo-Canadian co-production, explores the themes of illegal immigration and women's empowerment, and revolves around a woman who has to face unexpected events when she illegally immigrates to Canada to be with her younger brother.

== Plot ==
Jeet (Barkha Madan), is a judo champion living with her mother (Vineeta Mallick) in Punjab. She beats up the son of a minister after an indecent proposal from him. When her mother see the henchmen of the minister's son searching for her, she pleads with her to runaway to Pargat (Nishant Bahl), her brother working in Canada. Her mother sends her to Balbir (Naresh Gosain), a local tout who tricks her into smuggling. His nephew Kuldeep (Sumit Suri) ensures that Jeet carries a bag containing diamonds along to Canada and delivers it to him once she reaches there.

Jeet reaches Canada and manages to pass through the airport with her illegal documents but soon the safe house where she is taken gets raided by the police. She manages to escape and meet Pargat at the restaurant he works for and watches him working as a dishwasher. Pargat takes her to his home, which he shares with other illegal immigrants. The same night, Pargat is kidnapped by Kuldeep's goons. Jeet feels helpless but cannot call the cops either given her situation. The kidnappers demand the bag that Jeet was to give Kuldeep. Jeet soon realises that Kuldeep is behind this and is trying to fool Balbir. Jeet wants the bag to be given to his goons to make his uncle feel that the bag was stolen and get all the diamonds. Jeet informs Balbir and he finally accepts that Kuldeep has been fooling him and tells Jeet that he himself is coming to Canada.

In the meantime with the help of the restaurant singer Maryam (Kanza Feris), where Pargat worked, Jeet finds the hideout where Pargat was locked and manages to free him. Pargat proposes Jeet to take out a few diamonds. Jeet manages to deliver the bag to Balbir, who offers her a diamond for her honesty. She gifts it to Maryam for all the help. Pargat and Jeet is then seen working as a chef and waiter respectively, while Maryam continue enthralling with her songs.

== Cast ==
- Barkha Madan as Jeet
- Sumit Suri as Kuldeep
- Nishant Bahl as Pargat
- Kanza Feris as Maryam
- Naresh Gosain as Balbir
- Vineeta Malik as mother of Jeet

== Reviews ==
A review in Free Press Journal lamented that the director "did not appear to be clear as to which route he wanted to take – the emotionally affecting immigrant experience or the thrill seeking actioner." adding that he fails to garner affect as he tries for both. "Given the storyline of illegal immigration and human trafficking, definitely much more could have been done with the technique and telling," the reviewer wrote.

The review in Mumbai Mirror noted that the film exposes the naivety of those Indians, who leave for greener pastures in search of a better life, with dignity, despite an awry third act that threatens to dilute the strength of its hero. The reviewer praised the central character Barkha Madan for invoking empathy in the role of the illegal immigrant.
