= Barkha Madan =

Indian model, actress and film producer

Venerable Barkha Madan
- Title: Buddhist nun (Ven.)

Personal life
- Born: Barkha Madan; August 17, 1974 (age 52) Punjab, India
- Known for: Bhoot, Soch Lo, Surkhaab; finalist in Femina Miss India 1994
- Other name: Gyalten Samten
- Occupation: Former model, beauty pageant contestant, actress, film producer, Buddhist nun
- Website: www.barkhamadan.com

Religious life
- Religion: Buddhism
- School: Tibetan Buddhism
- Lineage: Drikung Kagyu
- Dharma name: Gyalten Samten

Senior posting
- Based in: Himachal Pradesh, India
- Awards: Best Feature Film – Canada International Film Festival (for Surkhaab)

Barkha Madan, also known as Gyalten Samten, is an Indian Buddhist nun, as well as a former model, beauty queen, actress and film producer, who has appeared in Hindi and Punjabi language films. She has also appeared in television serials and hosted some TV shows. Impressed by Buddhist ideologies, in November 2012 she had her ordination to become a Buddhist nun and changed her name to Ven. Gyalten Samten.

== Early life and modelling ==
Madan was born to a Punjabi family. In 1994, she competed at the Femina Miss India pageant alongside winners Sushmita Sen and Aishwarya Rai. Other participants competed in that year were Priya Gill, Swetha Menon, Jesse Randhawa and Manini De. She received the title of Miss Tourism India where she participated at the inaugural Miss Tourism International pageant. At the end of the pageant, she won third runner-up alongside Malaysian actress and model, Emylia Abdul Hamid who was the runner-up of the said pageant.

== Acting career ==
She made her debut on the big screen with the 1996 Bollywood film Khiladiyon Ka Khiladi with Akshay Kumar and Rekha. Though many offers came to her following her impressive performance in Khiladiyon Ka Khiladi, Barkha preferred to remain selective. She made her entry in foreign films with the Indo-Dutch movie Driving Miss Palmen. It was Ram Gopal Varma's 2003 horror film Bhoot which proved to be a turning point in Barkha's career. The movie became an instant hit. She played the role of a ghost in the movie, earning praise for her performance.

She started a production and distribution company named Golden Gate LLC, to promote talented independent filmmakers. It produced two critically acclaimed films, Soch Lo and Surkhaab, with her in the lead. Barkha has also been a popular face in the television industry, appearing in about 20 TV shows.

== Turning to spirituality ==
In November 2012, she decided to become a Buddhist nun. She was quite impressed by the ideologies of Buddhism and is an avid follower of the Dalai Lama. She had her ordination from Sera Je Monastery on 4 November under Lama Zopa Rinpoche's supervision. She later commented that it was the most important and right decision she ever made in her life.

== Filmography ==
=== Films ===
Year	Title	Role	Notes
1996	Khiladiyon Ka Khiladi		Bollywood debut
1996	Driving Miss Palmen		Indo-Dutch co-production
1999	Tera Mera Pyar	Preet	Lead Actress
2003	Bhoot	Manjeet Khosla	Played the ghost
2010	Soch Lo	Raina	Also producer
2014	Surkhaab	Jeet	Also producer; won Best Feature (Canada International Film Festival)

=== Television ===
Year(s)	Title	Role	Network / Notes
1999–2001	Nyaay		DD Metro drama series
2002–2003	1857 Kranti	Rani Laxmibai	Historical TV serial
2005–2009	Saat Phere: Saloni Ka Safar		Zee TV serial

=== Pageants and Production ===
- Finalist – Femina Miss India 1994
- Titleholder – Miss Tourism India / Miss Tourism International
- Founder – Golden Gate LLC / Creations (produced Soch Lo, Surkhaab)

=== Television ===
- 1857 Kranti as Rani Laxmibai
- Ghar Ek Sapnaa as Devika
- Saat Phere – Saloni Ka Safar as Reva Sehgal
- Suraag – The Clue as Ruby Ajeet Kumar (Episode 24), Rehana (Episode 36), Malathi Mahesh Sarang (Episode 42), and Poonam Pratap Singh (Episode 51)
- Nyaay
