= Lord Curzon Bridge =

Coordinates: 25°30′27″N 81°52′00″E

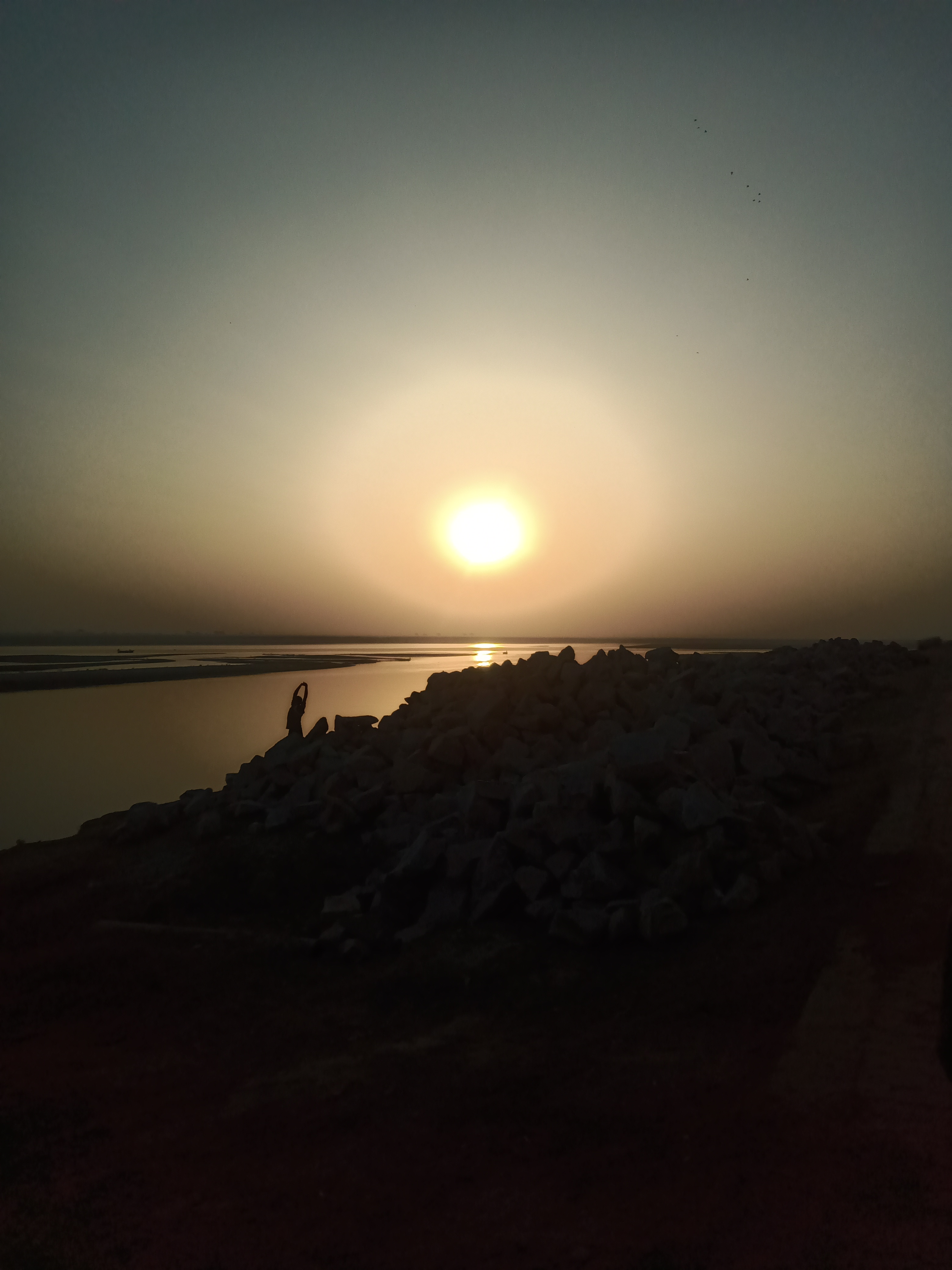
Sunrise scene near Lord Curzon Bridge Phaphamau

Lord Curzon Bridge is a road and rail bridge spanning the River Ganges and connecting Prayagraj with Phaphamau from the Teliarganj area of India. The bridge is 914 meters long. It was sanctioned as state railway bridge in 1901 and was built for both railway and vehicle traffic. The bridge consists of single broad gauge line with roadway on the top. The usage of the bridge for road traffic started on 20 December 1905 and for railways on 15 June 1905. The bridge was closed in 1998 due to safety concerns.

The bridge was in talks in 2017 as the commissioner requested the government to develop the bridge into a heritage site instead of dismantling it. As per the reports of the officials, Uttar Pradesh government requested the railways to hand over it to the state government rather than dismantling it. This was later agreed by the Railways.
