= PC Jeweller =

Indian jewelry company

PC Jeweller Ltd
- Type: Public
- Traded as: BSE: 534809; NSE: PCJEWELLER
- Industry: Jewellery
- Founded: 2005; 21 years ago
- Headquarters: New Delhi, India
- Key people: Balram Garg (Managing Director)
- Products: Gold, Diamond Jewellery and silver articles
- Revenue: ₹650 crore (US$67 million) (2024)
- Website: www.pcjeweller.com

PC Jeweller Limited is a jeweller based in New Delhi, India. It started operations in April 2005 with one showroom at Karol Bagh Delhi and 50 showrooms in India. It is a first generation business promoted by two brothers- Padam Chand Gupta and Balram Garg. It presently has 50 stores in 38 cities across 13 States/UT.

PC Jeweller engages in the manufacture, export, wholesale and retail of gold and diamond jewelry in India. The company's business model consists of opening large format, standalone stores at high street locations. The company sells only hall marked jewellery and certified diamond jewellery.

== History ==
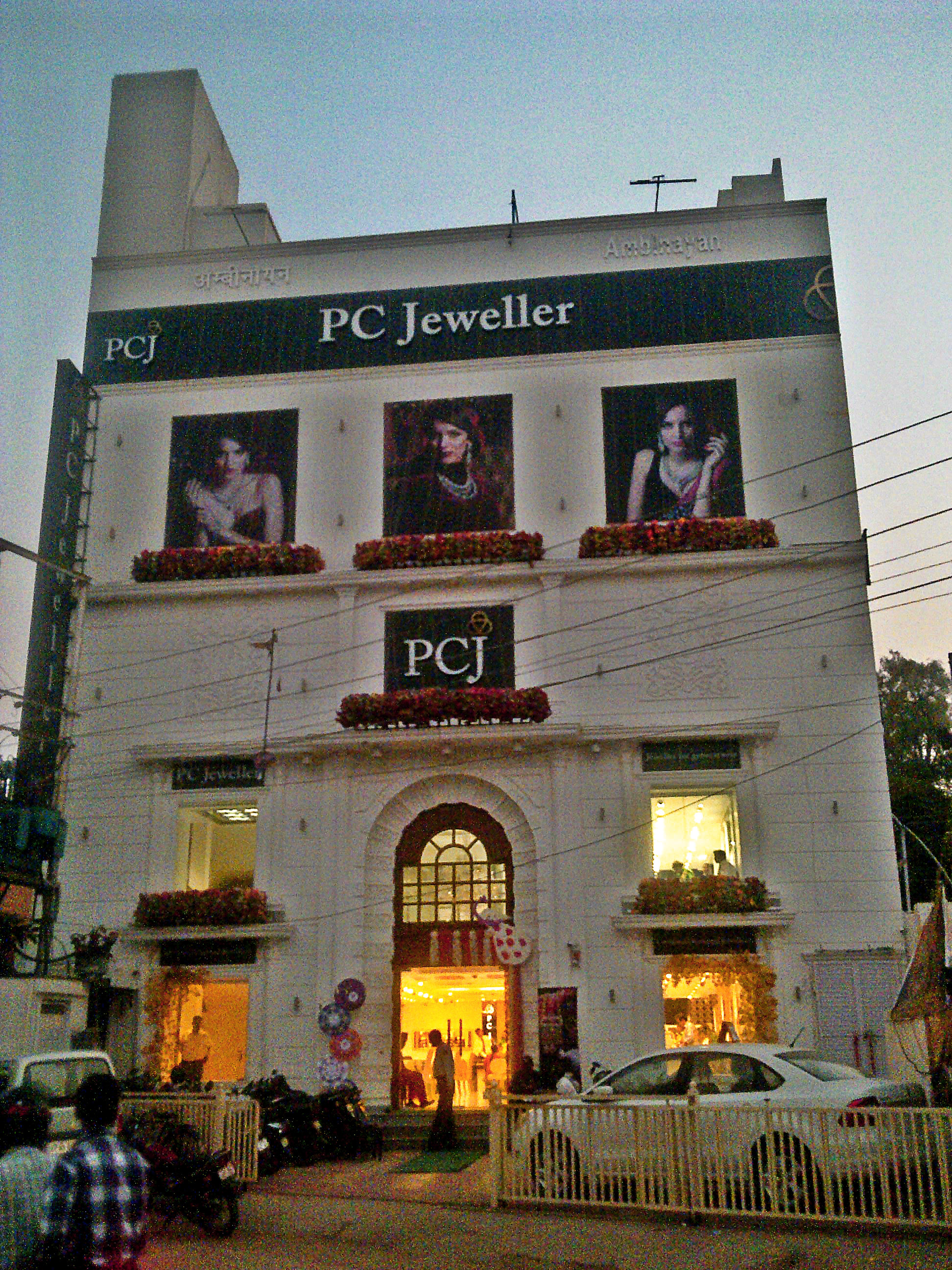
A store in Varanasi.

In 2005, P Chand Jewellers was incorporated and a showroom opened in Karol bagh. In 2007, Jeweller opened two more showrooms in Noida and Panchukla (Haryana). Company also commences export operations from the manufacturing unit at the Noida SEZ. In 2008, company opened two showrooms in Faridabad and Dehradun. In 2009, company commences operations at the manufacturing unit in Selaqui, an industrial area in Dehradun District. Company opened two showrooms in Pitampura (New Delhi) and Chandigarh. In 2011, the company changed its status from a private limited to a public limited company and was listed on the NSE and BSE on 27 December 2012. Export operations unit begin from the Noida SEZ. Company opened eight showrooms in Ludhiana, Bilaspur, Pali, South Extension (New Delhi), Beawar, Ajmer and Amritsar. In 2012, Jeweller opened six showrooms in Kanpur, Rohtak, Indirapuram (Ghaziabad), Rajouri Garden (New Delhi), Kingsway Camp (New Delhi) and Greater Kailash – 1 (New Delhi)

== Awards ==
- 2006: Awarded the Best Showroom award for Diamond Season by the B2C consultants, and brand architects
- 2008: Awarded Jeweller of the year in the Business Sphere Awards by the Business Sphere Group, Academics Bureau Publications Private Limited.
- 2010: Awarded Highest Exporter and the Best Exporter in the gems and jewellery sector by the Noida SEZ, Department of commerce, Ministry of commerce and industry, Government of India for the year 2009-2010
- 2011: Awarded Highest Exporter (SEZ Unit) and the Best Exporter (Gems and Jewellery) sector by the Noida SEZ, Department of Commerce, Ministry of Commerce and Industry, Government of India for the year 2010–2011.
- 2012: Awarded Niryat Shree Silver Trophy in the gems and jewellery non-MSME category, by the federation of Indian Export Organisations, set up by the Ministry of Commerce and Industry, Government of India for the year 2009–2010.
- 2013: Awarded the Large - Plain Precious Metal Jewellery' Award at Indian Gems and Jewellery Awards

== Stores ==
PC Jeweller has 50 stores in 38 cities across 13 States/UT. The company procures a large portion of its gold under the Reserve Bank of India's Metal (Gold) Loan policy. PC Jeweller had its initial public offering in December 2012. As of 2012 the company planned to open 20 stores each year and start opening franchise stores as well.
