= Gaddalakonda Ganesh (soundtrack) =

- Album cover

Soundtrack album by Mickey J. Meyer
- Released: 7 August 2018
- Recorded: 2018
- Studios: Audible Studios, New York City
- Genre: Feature film soundtrack
- Length: 13:10
- Language: Telugu
- Labels: Sony Music India; Saregama (one song)
- Producer: Mickey J. Meyer

Mickey J. Meyer chronology
Oh! Baby (2019)	Gaddalakonda Ganesh (2018)	Iddari Lokam Okate (2019)

Singles from Gaddalakonda Ganesh
- 1. "Jarra Jarra" Released: 21 July 2018; 2. "Gagana Veedhilo" Released: 23 July 2018; 3. "Waka Waka" Released: 26 July 2018; 4. "Elluvochi Godaramma" Released: 28 July 2018

Gaddalakonda Ganesh is the soundtrack album composed by Mickey J. Meyer for the 2018 Telugu-language action comedy film of the same name starring Varun Tej, Atharvaa, Pooja Hegde and Mirnalini Ravi in lead roles, directed by Harish Shankar. The film marks Meyer's second collaboration with Harish after Subramanyam for Sale (2014). The film featured four tracks with lyrics written by Bhaskarabhatla, Vanamali, Chandrabose and Veturi Sundararama Murthy. The soundtrack album was released by Sony Music India on 2 August 2018. The initial release contained only three tracks; the fourth one was excluded as it was released under the record label Saregama. The release coincided with a promotional event held in Hyderabad to promote film's fourth single "Elluvochi Godaramma".

The soundtrack received positive reviews from the critics, who were appreciative of the lyrics and Meyer's instrumentation in tune with the film's setting. Upon the release, the song "Elluvochi Godaramma" topped the charts and increased the buzz for the film.

== Production ==
In January 2019, it was reported that Devi Sri Prasad would score the music in his third collaboration with Harish Shankar, after Gabbar Singh (2012) and DJ: Duvvada Jagannadham (2017); and second collaboration with Varun Tej after F2: Fun and Frustration (2019). But later Mickey J. Meyer was roped in to compose music and background score of the film. This marked his second collaboration with both Harish and Tej after Subramanyam For Sale (2015) Mister (2017). Lyricists Bhaskarabhatla, Vanamali, Chandrabose and Veturi Sundararama Murthy were signed to write lyrics of the songs. The audio rights were bagged by Sony Music India. In an interview Harish Shankar said "Apart from the remix of Velluvachhi Godaramma, the film has four more songs and all of them have been composed well". In late August 2019, Harish revealed that Meyer is working on the background score of the film.

Having done Subrahmanyam For Sale with him, I know he can be better. After watching Mahanati, I became a fan of his music for the movie. He has gone massy with Valmiki and superbly so.

— Harish Shankar

== Composition ==
The first track "Jarra Jarra" was sung by Anurag Kulkarni and Uma Neha. The lyrics for the song was written by Bhaskarabhatla. When he was writing the song, his mother died. "He wrote the song nevertheless, saying that doing his work would give him consolation in times of pain", Harish said.

The second song "Gagana Veedhilo" was penned by Vanamali, and was recorded by Anurag Kulkarni, and Sweta Subramanian. The third song "Waka Waka" was sung by Anurag Kulkarni, and Mickey J Meyer himself, with the lyrics penned by Chandrabose.

Meyer remixed the song "Elluvachi Godaramma" from 1982 Telugu film Devatha and was used in the film with the title "Elluvochi Godaramma". The song was penned by lyricist Veturi Sundararama Murthy. S. P. Balasubrahmanyam gave his voice for the song, while the voice of P. Susheela was retained from the original version.

== Marketing and release ==
The first single "Jarra Jarra" was released on 21 July 2018. Later, its video teaser was unveiled on Wednesday 22 August, on the occasion of Chiranjeevi's birthday. On 4 August 2018, makers unveiled that the second single would release on the next day. The song "Gagana Veedhilo" was released on 5 July 2018 on YouTube. On Saturday 11 August, it was announced that third single would release soon and the song titled "Wala Waka" was released on 12 July 2018. The makers unveiled the making video of song "Elluvochi Godaramma" on 15 September, on the film's pre-release event held at Shilpakala Vedika in Hyderabad. The fourth single "Elluvochi Godaramma" was released on 17 March 2016. The song launch event was held on the same in Hyderabad, with Devatha film's director K. Raghavendra Rao gracing the event as the chief guest.

== Music videos ==
The music video of "Elluvochi Godaramma" featuring Varun Tej and Pooja Hegde was released on 3 April 2018. Hegde was highly praised upon its release. Choreographed by Sekhar, music video was shot in late-August 2019 on the banks of Godavari River. "Jarra Jarra" song's video was released on 6 February 2018. Music video choreographed by Sekhar and was filmed in July 2019. Video of songs "Gagana Veedhilo" and "Waka Waka", choreographed by Bhanu was released on 1 January 2018.

== Track listing ==
Telugu
No.	Title	Lyrics	Singer(s)	Length
1.	"Jarra Jarra"	Bhaskarabhatla	Anurag Kulkarni, Uma Neha	3:01
2.	"Gagana Veedhilo"	Vanamali	Anurag Kulkarni, Sweta Subramanian	3:15
3.	"Waka Waka"	Chandrabose	Anurag Kulkarni, Mickey J Meyer	3:27
4.	"Elluvochi Godaramma"	Veturi Sundararama Murthy	S. P. Balasubrahmanyam, P. Susheela	3:27
Total length:				13:10

Hindi
No.	Title	Lyrics	Singer(s)	Length
1.	"Waka Waka"	Raqueeb Alam	Prudhvi Chandra, Mickey J Meyer	3:27

== Reception ==
Reviewing the soundtrack album, Neeshita Nyayapati of The Times of India wrote "The album of Gaddalakonda Ganesh is a clear winner, with Mickey J Meyer delivering two songs that completely surprise you, because it's not the kind of work you expect from the composer of classy tunes from films like Mahanati and Kotha Bangaru Lokam. While Gagana Veedhilo is typical of his work, it's still a good enough listen. But Waka Waka is our definite pick from this album." A critic of The Hans India wrote "Music by Mickey J Meyer is truly an asset for this film. Not only his songs, but also the background score given by Mickey J Meyer helped the movie a lot."

123 Telugu noted "Mickey J Meyer and his music score are impressive but his BGM was best in recent times." Jeevi of Idlebrain.com described the music as "good" and wrote "Background music makes an impact. Velluvachi Godaramma song and Jarra Jarra songs are entertaining. We shall appreciate both the director and the music director for not murdering the original song from Devatha. It is one of the most pleasant remixes in Telugu cinema."

== Impact ==
The song "Elluvochi Godaramma" had approximately 10 million views on YouTube within its release, which helped in the marketing of the film. Various versions of the song were uploaded by amateur singers, guitarists and DJs on social networking sites. Gaddalakonda Ganesh had less than 3 weeks for the promotion, unlike other Telugu films which indulge in months of promotion. However, it was "Elluvochi Godaramma" which became a rage and created instant buzz for the film in the market. The music video on YouTube has garnered over 110 million views very shortly. The Times of India listed it as one of the five best remix songs in Tollywood.

== Album credits ==
=== Songwriter(s) ===
- Mickey J. Meyer (Composer, Arranger)

=== Performer(s) ===
- Composition, production, musical arrangements, recording, mixing, keyboards – Mickey J. Meyer
- Lyrics – Bhaskarabhatla, Vanamali, Chandrabose, Veturi Sundararama Murthy, Raqueeb Alam
- Singers – Anurag Kulkarni, Uma Neha, Sweta Subramanian, S. P. Balasubrahmanyam, P. Susheela, Prudhvi Chandra
- Chorus – Ramya Behara, Mohana Bhogaraju

=== Instruments ===
- Bass Guitar – Charles Berthoud
- Rhythms – Venkatesh Patvari
- Violin – Sandilya Pisapati
- Indian Rhythms – Santhosh
- Mastering – Darren Vermaas

== Accolades ==
Award (Note: Awards, festivals and organizations are in alphabetical order.)	Date of ceremony (Note: Date is linked to the article about the awards held that year, wherever possible.)	Category	Recipient(s)	Result	Ref.
South Indian International Movie Awards	18 September 2021	Best Music Director – Telugu	Mickey J. Meyer	Nominated	
Santosham Film Awards	14 November 2021	Best Male Playback Singer	S. P. Balasubrahmanyam	Won	
