= Bhartha Mahasayulaku Wignyapthi =

2026 Telugu film by Kishore Tirumala

- Theatrical release poster
- Directed by: Kishore Tirumala
- Written by: Kishore Tirumala
- Produced by: Sudhakar Cherukuri; Ramana Rao Rudrapati
- Starring: Ravi Teja; Ashika Ranganath; Dimple Hayathi
- Cinematography: Prasad Murella
- Edited by: A. Sreekar Prasad
- Music by: Bheems Ceciroleo
- Production company: SLV Cinemas
- Release date: 13 January 2026
- Running time: 130 minutes
- Country: India
- Language: Telugu

Bhartha Mahasayulaku Wignyapthi (transl. An Appeal to Husbands) is a 2026 Indian Telugu-language comedy drama film written and directed by Kishore Tirumala. The film was produced by Sudhakar Cherukuri and Ramana Rao Rudrapati under the banner SLV Cinemas. The film stars Ravi Teja, Ashika Ranganath, and Dimple Hayathi. It was released on 13 January 2026 and generally opened to mixed reviews. Despite the festive release window, it's a box office failure.

== Plot ==
Ram, a winemaker from Hyderabad, makes a wine called "Anarkali" and submits it to United Spirits, a company based in Spain. However, the company rejects the wine despite its best quality. Ram takes it personally and visits Spain along with his PA, Leela, to convince the company's management, headed by Manasa Shetty. They learn that she has rejected the wine based on the advice of her PA, Vinda. Ram hides his true identity and introduces himself as Satya to Manasa. He convinces Manasa to accept Anarkali while also exposing Vinda, who cheats Manasa by collaborating with the rival company. Manasa becomes fond of Ram, and they engage in casual sex. Ram, however, hides the fact that he is already married to Balamani. They both part ways, and Ram returns to India.

Ram consults psychologist Kamalasan Naidu for therapy, who advises Ram that he is not at fault and he should forget Manasa. Meanwhile, Manasa arrives in Hyderabad for a wine festival and comes across Ram. She tells Ram that she'll be in Hyderabad for 2 weeks and asks Ram to give her company. Naidu advises Ram to manage Manasa for a few more days until she leaves India.

Ram with the help of Leela tries to hide about Manasa from Balamani. Despite his best attempts, Ram gets close to being busted by Balamani. Ram feels guilty, and tells Manasa about his marriage. Manasa throws Ram out furiously. Later, Manasa gets drunk at a pub where she meets Balamani. Balamani hears Manasa's story and brings her home. Balamani also informs Manasa's brother, Rakesh, about this. Rakesh has a patchy relation with Manasa and wants to win her goodwill by taking revenge on Manasa's boyfriend.

Ram is shocked to see Manasa at his home. Rakesh asks Manasa about her boyfriend but she refuses to disclose, asking him to stay away. Manasa gives an ultimatum to Ram, asking him to choose between her and Balamani before she leaves India. Manasa also threatens to reveal the truth to Balamani if he didn't choose her.

Rakesh inquires about Manasa's activities in India. He learns that Manasa met her boyfriend at a travel company owned by Ram’s brother-in-law, Sudha, and Ram has visited Spain earlier. Rakesh also brings Vinda to India to reveal the truth. Rakesh figures out that Ram is Manasa's boyfriend and reveals the same to Balamani. Balamani refuses to believe and backs Ram as an ideal husband.

While returning to home, Ram reveals to Balamani that he cheated on her with Manasa during his visit to Spain. Balamani is left heartbroken. The following day, Ram, Balamani, and Manasa meet, where Ram accepts his mistake and asks for forgiveness. When Balamani and Manasa refuse to forgive, Ram attempts to suicide. At the hospital, Manasa tells Balamani that she deserves Ram more than her, and they should reunite. Balamani accepts Ram's mistake and forgives him.

In the end, breaking the fourth wall, Ram advises the audience that inside every person, there are two voices: one is their own, which says, "It's wrong, don't do it" and the other is their alter ego's voice, which says, "It's okay, just do it, you only live once." He suggests listening to their own voice, which will lead to a happy life. Otherwise, listening to the alter ego might ruin it. He appeals to all the husbands out there to listen to their own voice.

== Cast ==
- Ravi Teja as Rayapati Rama Satya Narayana / Elvis
- Ashika Ranganath as Manasa Shetty
- Dimple Hayathi as Balamani, Ram's wife
- Sunil as Sudharshan "Sudha", Ram's brother-in-law
- Vennela Kishore as Leela, Ram's PA
- Satya as Vinda alias Bellam, Manasa's PA
- Soniya Singh as Neeru aka Neeraja, Sudha's wife and Balamani's friend
- Tarak Ponnappa as Rakesh Shetty, Manasa's brother
- Getup Srinu as Manju, Rakesh's assistant
- Muralidhar Goud as Psychologist Kamalasan Naidu
- Kadambari Kiran as Doctor
- Ajay Ghosh as Goon
- Harsha Chemudu as Bangkok Sathya
- Vajja Venkata Giridhar
- Rohan Roy G as Trinetra
- Edin Rose as a guest at Manasa's friend's birthday party ("Karthika Deepam Remix" song)

== Production ==
In March 2025, it was reported that Ravi Teja and director Kishore Tirumala were collaborating on an untitled project. The production on the film began with the muhurtam puja shot held in Hyderabad on 5 June 2025. The principal photography began on 16 June 2025 under the tentative title RT76, as it is Ravi Teja's seventy-sixth film. In June 2025, it was reported that Ashika Ranganath and Ketika Sharma would play the other leads in this film. The title of the film Bhartha Mahasayulaku Wignyapthi, was unveiled in October 2025. The same month, Ashika confirmed that she plays one of the leads. A few portions of the film were shot in Spain. The makers confirmed the title in November 2025. The same month, Dimple Hayathi confirmed to be playing the wife of the protagonist while Ashika plays the girlfriend role. During the press meet, Kishore Tirumala revealed that he wrote the script based on his real-life experiences.

== Music ==
The music was composed by Bheems Ceciroleo.

No.	Title	Lyrics	Music	Singer(s)	Length
1.	"Bella Bella"	Suresh Gangula	Bheems Ceciroleo	Nakash Aziz, Rohini Sorrat	3:37
2.	"Addham Mundhu"	Chandrabose	Bheems Ceciroleo	Shreya Ghoshal, Kapil Kapilan	3:55
3.	"Vaammo Vaayyo"	Dev Pawer	Bheems Ceciroleo	Swathi Reddy UK	3:01
4.	"Karthika Deepam Remix"	Devulapilli Krishna Sastry, Omkar Paritala	Bheems Ceciroleo, Satyam, Dhina	P. Susheela, S. Janaki, Nithyasree Mahadevan	2:56
Total length:					13:29

The remixed version of the song "Elluvachi Godaramma" is used in the end credits of the film's Tamil, Kannada, and Malayalam dubbed versions.

== Release ==
Bhartha Mahasayulaku Wignyapthi was released on 13 January 2026, coinciding with Sankranthi. The film premiered digitally on ZEE5 on 13 March 2026, streaming in Telugu, Tamil, Kannada, and Malayalam.

== Reception ==
Risha Ganguly of Times Now rated the film 3/5 stars and wrote, "Bhartha Mahasayulaku Wignyapthi banks heavily on Ravi Teja’s charm and a seasoned comedy cast, but its predictable plot and weak second half hold it back. While the first half offers mild entertainment, the lack of novelty and emotional depth makes the film feel dated." Swaroop Kodur of The Indian Express rated the film 3/5 stars and wrote, "Kishore Tirumala’s film is predictable in many ways, but the ensemble cast elevates the material whenever needed." Sandeep Athreya of Sakshi Post rated the film 3/5 stars and wrote, "It may not be path-breaking, but it is sincere in intent and effective in execution for the most part." Srivathsan Nadadhur of The Hindu wrote, "Writer-director Kishore Tirumala’s Telugu film has a few funny episodes, although it fails to bring anything new to an already wafer-thin premise".

Jalapathi Gudelli of Telugucinema.com gave the film 2.5/5 stars and wrote, "Kishore Tirumala does not offer anything new, except placing Ravi Teja in an entertaining and lighter-vein setup. While the film has its fun moments, the dragged sequences and predictable ending turn it into a missed opportunity." Shreya Varanasi of The Times of India rated the film 2.5/5 stars and wrote, "Overall, Bhartha Mahasayulaku Wignyapthi works in parts, largely because of its comedy. With a thin storyline and an uneven second half, it remains an average, one-time watch."

Suresh Kavirayani of Cinema Express rated the film 2/5 stars and wrote, "There are a few laughs here and there, but overall, the film fails to impress and falls short of Kishore Tirumala’s usual standards. Many jokes are lifted directly from social media instead of being organically written." Suhas Sistu of The Hans India wrote, "Overall, the film offers light, mindless entertainment with a few enjoyable moments, though sharper writing could have elevated it further." BVS Prakash of Deccan Chronicle wrote, "Known for his punchlines and comic timing, the actor is let down by the familiar storyline."
