= Dimple Hayathi =

Indian actress (born 1998)

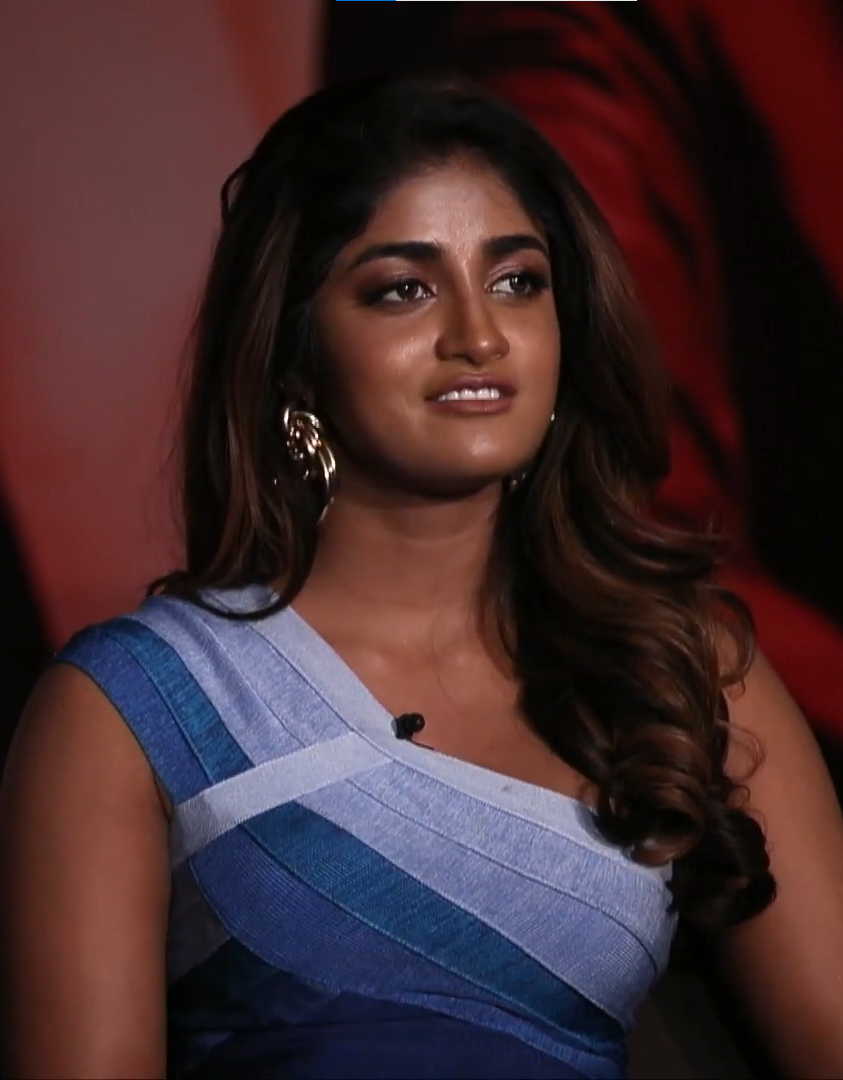
- Hayathi in 2022
- Born: Dimple; 21 August 1988 (age 38); Vijayawada, Andhra Pradesh, India
- Occupation: Actress
- Years active: 2017–present
- Spouse: Victor David

Dimple Hayathi (born 21 August 1988) is an Indian actress who predominantly appears in Telugu films.

== Early and personal life ==
Hayathi was born on 21 August 1988 in Vijayawada, Andhra Pradesh. She was brought up in Hyderabad. She was born as Dimple but later suffixed her last name with Hayathi, for numerological reasons. Her grandfather's sister is Prabha, and she is related to Dasari Narayana Rao. Many of her relatives worked in the film industry and her mother's younger sister acted in Malayalam films.

== Career ==
Hayathi started her film career by debuting with the Telugu film Gulf (2017). Later, Hayathi starred in a Telugu film Eureka before starring in the bilingual film Devi 2 (2019). Her next appearance was in an item number "Jarra Jarra" song opposite Varun Tej and Atharvaa in the film Gaddalakonda Ganesh (2019).

== Filmography ==
Key
†	Denotes films that have not yet been released

Year	Title	Role	Language	Notes	Ref.
2017	Gulf	Lakshmi	Telugu		
2019	Devi 2	Eesha	Tamil	Tamil film debut; Bilingual Film	
2019	Abhinetri 2	Eesha	Telugu	Tamil film debut; Bilingual Film	
2019	Gaddalakonda Ganesh	Herself	Telugu	Special appearance in the song "Jarra Jarra"	
2020	Eureka	Shobitha	Telugu		
2021	Atrangi Re	Mandakini "Mandy" Rao	Hindi	Hindi film debut	
2022	Veeramae Vaagai Soodum	Mythili	Tamil		
2022	Khiladi	Chitra / Aditi	Telugu		
2023	Ramabanam	Bhairavi	Telugu		
2025	Dilmaar	Maya	Kannada	Kannada film debut	
2026	Bhartha Mahasayulaku Wignyapthi	Balamani	Telugu		
2026	Aadarsha Kutumbam House No: 47 - AK47	Herself	Telugu	Special appearance in the song "Narayanamma"	
2026	Bhogi †	Mandaram	Telugu	Filming	

== Controversies ==
In 2023, she and a man identified as her husband, Victor David, were embroiled in a controversy after allegedly damaging an IPS officer's car in Hyderabad's Jubilee Hills area. Reports say David accidentally hit the vehicle, and when confronted, Hayathi reportedly kicked the car, prompting a police complaint.

In late September 2025, a 22-year-old domestic worker, Priyanka Bibar, filed a complaint alleging that she had been abused and harassed while employed at Hayathi’s residence in Shaikpet, Hyderabad.

According to the complaint, the worker was repeatedly insulted and denied food, was threatened during an altercation over the couple's dog, and had her mobile phone allegedly snatched and smashed when she attempted to record the incident; she further alleged that her clothes were torn while escaping the residence. Filmnagar Police have registered a case against Dimple Hayathi and her presumed husband, David, under Sections 74, 79, 351(2), and 324(2) of the Bharatiya Nyaya Sanhita (BNS).

Film Nagar police station inspector Santosham told they have issued notice to both the actress and the man identified as her husband, based on complaint of Priyanka.
