= Assault Sethu =

- Bobby Simha as Assault Sethu
- First appearance: Jigarthanda; 2014
- Last appearance: Jigarthanda DoubleX; 2023
- Created by: Karthik Subbaraj
- Portrayed by: Bobby Simha; Vijay Sethupathi (young version in metafictional film)

In-universe information
- Occupation: Gangster, actor
- Spouse: Ganga

Assault Sethu (/seɪθu/) is a fictional character and the main antagonist of the 2014 Indian Tamil-language film Jigarthanda, created by its director/writer Karthik Subbaraj and portrayed primarily by Bobby Simha. The character is a gangster based in Madurai, Tamil Nadu who later becomes an actor after meeting Karthik Subramani, an aspiring film director. It became Simha's breakthrough role, for which he won the National Film Award for Best Actor in a Supporting Role.

== Development ==
While creating the character of Sethu for the film Jigarthanda (2014), director/writer Karthik Subbaraj was inspired by Rajinikanth's villainous roles in his early career, especially that in 16 Vayathinile (1977). Karthik joked that Sethu was similar to himself as, during the time he spent researching about crime in Madurai, where the character is based, he became close to a gangster himself. Sethu was named after Vijay Sethupathi, who Karthik initially wanted to cast. The "Assault" prefix comes from Madurai slang which means "to do things with ease". Numerous actors were approached for the role, including Raghava Lawrence, R. Parthiban, R. Madhavan, Pasupathy and Kishore, before Bobby Simha was finalised. Karthik initially rejected Simha's request to play Sethu as he wanted him to play Siddharth's role Karthik, but eventually accepted after Simha established himself through Neram and Soodhu Kavvum (both 2013). Sethupathi went on to portray a younger version of the character in a metafictional film directed by Siddharth's character. To prepare for his role, Simha interacted with actual gangsters who were in prison. Sethu also appears as an infant in the prequel Jigarthanda DoubleX (2023).

== Character biography ==
Sethu was a regular child who lived in Madurai with his adopted mother Paingilli after his biological parents Alliyus "Alliyan" Caesar and Malaiarasi were killed when he was an infant by a corrupt police officer Rathna Kumar and his subordinates as they were trying to protect their tribe. Sethu was rescued by his father's friend Kiruban and his wife Paingalli who was part of the tribe.

When Karthik interviews Sethu and asks him about his family, he states that Kiruba and Paingilli had a biological son (Sethu's stepbrother), who died during childbirth, and that Kiruba died in a mill accident. Since then, Paingilli raised Sethu as her own and from a young age Sethu was known to be a brash kid who loved to pick a fight with his classmates to prove himself. His life changed when his best friend Rasu was almost beaten by his lover's brother and his friends but Sethu intervenes and rescues his friend, this catches the eyes of a thug named Murugan who was a friend of the lover's brother and tries to kill Sethu in revenge but Sethu scars him and is arrested. However Murugan's brother Shanmugam releases him and warns him to never cross in their way and that if he does so, he will personally murder him. Sethu knowing that Shanmugam will likely kill him stabs both Shanmugam and Murugan to death with a knife and manages to escape with the help of Rasu.

Karthik Subramani, an aspiring film director, visits Sundar, a film producer who suggests making a gangster film despite his friend's reluctance after witnessing Rasu kill an victim by throwing a rock on his chest with the help of Sethu's men. Karthik decides to document the life of "Assault" Sethu, who is now a murderous gangster based in Madurai along with Rasu who now works for Sethu and make a screenplay out of it after learning about Sethu from a police officer who is friends with his uncle. Karthik travels to Madurai and enlists the help of a college friend Oorani to conduct surveillance on Sethu and his men. Karthik learns about various murders committed by Sethu(as shown in the flashbacks such as how he managed to escape getting hacked to death by a group of men carrying aruvals and knives by fighting them off and shooting them to death with his gun despite getting scarred and stabbed multiple times in the process and how he killed an victim by repeatedly hitting him with a mechanic metal rim in public, he also learns about his empire and gang especially Rasu who stabs a person dead out of loyalty for Sethu in public and has became an alcoholic) and to get closer to Sethu, Karthik also puts up an act of reciprocating the love of Kayalvizhi, whose mother cooks for Sethu. Amdist this, Sethu learns from his associate Ponram that one of his henchmen is a spy working for a rival gang and is later almost shot dead by a member of a rival gang who mistakenly kills another person thinking it is Sethu. He is then captured by Sethu's gang and Sethu tries to extract information from him to no avail as Rasu stabs him to death after a brief interrogation. Karthik and Oorni eventually arouse the suspicion of Rasu and Sethu's other right-hand men Senthil (who is an aruval wielding henchman and the brute force of the gang who does not engage in any of the gangs habits such as drinking and smoking, and an avid fan of B grade movies despite being loyal to his family) after several incidents in which they tried to befriend them in order to learn more about Sethu, and they put the underling Soundar to watch them.

Karthik and Oorni eventually manage to befriend Soundar and Karthik even plants a wireless microphone in a music player and lends it to Soundar, who is busted as a mole for an opposing gang whom Rasu and Senthil bring along to find Sekar(a rival gang leader whose brother was brutally killed by Sethu and his gang as they chopped off one of his arms off and stabbed him to death and whom Sounder worked as a spy for) after they tell him that Ganeshan(another one of Sethu’s rivals was killed off after he pleaded with Sethu to let him go). Sounder pleads with Sethu and his gang to let him go only to be shot dead in the head by Sethu who also manages to kill the rival gang's leader Sekar by shooting him several times despite his pleas with his gun through the help of Ponram who captures him with his own men. He finds the microphone and locates Karthik and Oorani, the duo then attempt to escape believing that Sethu and his gang will go after Ganeshan's gang only for Sethu to arrive his men and Ponram, Sethu then barges into Oorni’s house with his men after threatening them with his gun. Sethu has his men beat the duo up and he then attempts to kill them with his aruval only for Karthik to confess that he was planning to make a film about Sethu. Enamoured by the prospect of being the subject of a film, Sethu initiates Karthik and Oorani into his gang. Sethu and his gang take Karthik along for their criminal activities(including when Senthil accidentally shoots an victim dead with Sethu's gun when trying to extract information from him based on Oorni's advice to use the gun to scare him into confessing the information as the victim did not pay heed to Senthils words when Senthil threatened him with his knife), and Karthik documents everything.

When he is ready to leave Madurai to work on the screenplay, Kayal discovers that Karthik used her for information. During a send-off party for Karthik, a vengeful Kayal remarks that Sethu should play himself in the film. He listens and threatens Karthik to direct the film with Sethu playing himself on screen. Sethu's gang also kidnap Sundar and force both men to make the film. Karthik tries to flee from Madurai but is caught by Rasu and Senthil, Sethu beats Karthik and Oorni up and threatens Karthik with his knife by telling him that his only choice is to make the movie with him playing the main character or never make the movie. Karthik dishearteningly agrees and later gains confidence after hearing an advice from Petti Kadai Pazhani(who was once a aspiring director like Karthik but was not able to complete making his film due to a feud with his producer) whom Karthik and Oorni initially asked for information regarding Sethu. Karthik soon learns that Sethu and his men(along with Vettu Kumar) cannot act in front of a camera. He hires a strict acting coach Muthu to train them and Oorani who also wanted to act in the film, to no avail even though Muthu sees a glimpse of potential in Sethu and trains him to act through the production of the film, A. Kumar.

After production of A. Kumar is wrapped, Sethu and his men create great fanfare for its release. During the first showing, however, Sethu is shocked. Realising that a serious gangster film featuring Sethu would not succeed, Karthik had surreptitiously changed the story into a comedy after a conversation with coach Muthu. The film was edited and dubbed in a way that shows Sethu as a man who achieves everything in life by crying. The film's "A" initial is revealed to stand for Azhuguni (Crybaby), not Assault. The audience laughs all throughout the film at Sethu's expense. Sethu also looses respect among his allies due to the movie, enraged Sethu becomes an alcoholic and his men search for Karthik, who, with the rest of the crew, has gone into hiding, he even gets into an argument with Kayal whom he slaps only for Rasu to intervene who smacks sense into him and learns that his men have almost found where Karthik is. While searching for them, Sethu realizes that the fear that people have for him does not equal respect. He finds that through Soundar's wife and his daughter who make him realize that by making people laugh through his film, he has earned true respect when he and his gang went to pay respect to Ponram's deceased father who was once a gangster like Sethu. For example, Paingilli, who has never spoken to him since he became a gangster, speaks to Sethu again after seeing the film. He also visits the theater alone where the audience is celebrating his movie and performance which makes Sethu wholeheartedly happy and cry.

Sethu and his gang eventually meet Karthik and Oorani by accident, as they were en route to deliver recordings of the former's boastful confessions to the police. Sethu has one of his gang members Kasi hold Oorani whilst having Rasu pour petrol over Karthik, intending to burn him himself with his cigarette the same way he had killed a reporter earlier in the movie, but changes his mind and forgives Karthik as Sethu expresses his frustrations and happiness toward the movie by successfully talking to him in gibberish, a cinematic language Muthu taught him. Karthik then points a gun given to him by his uncle for self defense at Sethu but chooses not to kill him as he decides to put Sethu's past behind him and let him seek a new life. Sethu then lets Karthik and Oorni go, and asks Karthik for Mani Ratnam's number. In a deleted scene, Rasu, Senthil, and Kasi question him on why he let Karthik go to which Sethu responds that Karthik made him realize that he is an artist deep down, and how the audience were cheering Sethu up. He also tells them that he is going to renounce his gangster lifestyle and that he does not want to marry Kayal anymore, he then leaves the trio behind with Rasu looking at Sethu in a gleeful manner as Senthil and Kasi are confused. Years later, Karthik, now an experienced director, uses Sethu's gang to bully Vijay Sethupathi for acting in his new film titled Jigarthanda, as Kayal, now Karthik's wife, is a fan of him. Elsewhere, Sethu is a full-time actor who is currently acting in a film made by director Vetrimaaran with coach Muthu helping him again. Sethu has also married Soundar's wife Ganga, and dotes on her daughter.

== Reception ==
Simha won the National Film Award for Best Actor in a Supporting Role for his portrayal of Sethu.

== Legacy ==
Sethu became one of Simha's most identifiable roles, and people would often remember him by that name. The character was portrayed by P. Ravi Shankar in Jigarthanda's Kannada remake of the same name (2016) renamed Assault Arumuga, by Varun Tej in the Telugu remake Gaddalakonda Ganesh (2019) renamed as the title character, and by Akshay Kumar in the Hindi remake Bachchhan Paandey (2022) as the title character. Simha later established a production company named Assault Productions as an homage to Sethu. His character Burma Sethu in the Telugu film Disco Raja (2020) was named after his Jigarthanda role.
