= Elluvachi Godaramma =

Song by S. P. Balasubrahmanyam and P. Susheela

Song by S. P. Balasubrahmanyam and P. Susheela

from the album Devatha
- Language: Telugu
- Released: 31 December 1982
- Recorded: 1982
- Genre: Dance; pop; jazz; Electronic dance music
- Length: 5:02
- Label: Saregama
- Composer: K. Chakravarthy
- Lyricist: Veturi Sundararama Murthy
- Producer: K. Chakravarthy

Devatha track listing
- 1. "Elluvachi Godaramma"; 2. "Cheera Kattindhi"; 3. "Kudikannu Kotagane"; 4. "Challagali Cheppindhi"; 5. "Yendavana"

Music video
- "Elluvachi Godaramma" on YouTube

"Elluvachi Godaramma" (also known as "Elluvachhi" or "Velluvachi Godaramma") is an Indian Telugu-language song in the soundtrack of the 1982 film Devatha, directed by K. Raghavendra Rao. Starring Sobhan Babu and Sridevi, the film is produced by D. Rama Naidu under the studio Suresh Productions. The song was composed by K. Chakravarthy, with lyrics by Veturi Sundararama Murthy and sung by S. P. Balasubrahmanyam and P. Susheela.

It was released on 31 December 1982 as the lead song from the album, through Saregama. The full video song, featuring scenes directly from the film, was released on 6 August 2011 on YouTube. After receiving huge response since decades, the song was remixed and released as "Elluvochi Godaramma" for the 2019 film Gaddalakonda Ganesh.

== 2019 version ==
"Elluvochi Godaramma"
- Song cover

Single by S. P. Balasubrahmanyam and P. Susheela

from the album Gaddalakonda Ganesh
- Language: Telugu
- Released: 17 September 2019
- Recorded: 2019
- Genre: Dance; pop; jazz; Electronic dance music
- Length: 3:27
- Label: Saregama
- Composer: Mickey J. Meyer
- Lyricist: Veturi Sundararama Murthy
- Producer: Mickey J. Meyer

Music video
- "Elluvochi Godaramma" on YouTube

"Elluvochi Godaramma" is an Indian Telugu-language song composed by Mickey J. Meyer, with lyrics by Veturi Sundararama Murthy and recorded by S. P. Balasubrahmanyam and P. Susheela for the soundtrack album of the 2019 film Gaddalakonda Ganesh. The song features Varun Tej and Pooja Hegde.

It was released on 17 September 2019 as the fourth single from the album, through Saregama. The full video song, featuring visuals directly from the film, was released on 1 November 2019 on YouTube. The song received positive response upon its release. The track also trended in the internet. S. P. Balasubrahmanyam won 20th Santosham Film Awards for Best Male Playback Singer.

=== Background and production ===
In late-August 2019, it was reported that the film would have the remixed version of the song "Elluvachi Godaramma" from Devatha (1982). Remixed by Mickey J. Meyer, it was recorded by S. P. Balasubrahmanyam, but retained the voice of P. Susheela from the original track. Meyer changed the beats of the song according to the current style and was used in the film. Harish Shankar, the director of the film revealed that it was his eight-year dream to remix the song in his film. Before the release of the film, Harish said "We have remixed Velluvachi Godaramma from Devatha (1982) and the song comes at an appropriate situation and goes in line with the narrative." "There is some valid reason for remixing Sridevi song and it will be best to find out the decision about the song while watching the movie on the big screen, he added" It was reported that, the flashback of the takes place in the 1982. When Ganesh (Varun Tej) sees Sridevi (Pooja Hegde), he remembers actress Sridevi. That's how they used this song. Tej said that Harish was extremely confident about remixing the song and he knew its history. Harish said he feel fortunate to give remuneration to his son Veturi Ravi for using Veturi's lyrics.

=== Music video ===
The music video was choreographed by Sekhar Master in late-August 2019 around Rajahmundry on the banks of Godavari River. The song featuring Varun Tej and Pooja Hegde, was shot for five days on the sand dunes near Yanam. Harish asked Sekhar Master to follow the style Salim Master followed in the 1980s. He revealed that when he asked for 500 bindes (brass pots), the producers bought 1500 bindes. It costed around ₹30 lakh. On 29 August 2019, the makers announced that they are filming the song at Godavari. "How about making a song with Binde in 2019? I thought As soon as the shoot of this song started in Yanam, I got tears in my eyes. I can't imagine anyone except Pooja in this song by Sridevigaru", he added. Varun said "I am not comfortable with songs and dances by nature. But I thought there will be a remix song of Chiranjeevi and Pawan in this film. But I got very excited when Shobhan Babu's song came out. I didn't want to recreate it so well. I am a huge fan of boys' songs." Hegde revealed that she watched the song twenty times before and tried to recreate the dance step. "It was hot and tiring. I've even had sunburns", she added.

The Times of India said "Besides the foot-tapping tune, the original number was famous for Sridevi's waist swaying and 100s of metal pots used as props in the background. Everything remains the same in Valmiki, however, the choreography has changed and thanks to Sekhar Master for some beautiful dance moves."

=== Marketing and release ===
The makers unveiled the making video of song "Elluvochi Godaramma" on 15 September 2019, on the film's pre-release event held at Shilpakala Vedika in Hyderabad. "Elluvochi Godaramma" was released on 17 September 2017. The song launch event was held on the same in Hyderabad, with K. Raghavendra Rao, director of Devatha gracing the event as the chief guest.

=== Critical reception ===
A critic from The Times of India commented "Besides Varun Tej’s impressive act as a dreadful gangster, the major attraction of Gaddalakonda Ganesh was the short-yet-impactful role of Pooja Hegde and her jaw-dropping presence in the yesteryear superhit number Elluvochi Godaramma. She pulled off the sizzling dance moves with ease and her irresistible beauty in a pink saree is something to watch out for."

Murali Krishna C H of The New Indian Express wrote "The much-hyped Velluvachi Godaramma, a remix of the celebratory song of the 80s featuring Sobhan Babu and Sridevi, pales in comparison with the original."

A critic from Industry Hit wrote "Pooja Hegde has matched the grace of Sridevi to a large extent with her own charm in the Velluvachi Godaramma song. Along with the visual beauty, soothing music, catchy lyrics, many other things, the graceful dance moments of Sridevi is also one of the factors for the song to be an evergreen classical hit."

Commenting the song as "entertaining", Jeevi of Idlebrain wrote "We shall appreciate both the director and the music director for not murdering the original song from Devatha. It is one of the most pleasant remixes in Telugu cinema."

=== Credits and personnel ===
- Mickey J. Meyer – composer, remix, keyboards
- Veturi Sundararama Murthy – lyricist
- S. P. Balasubrahmanyam – vocal
- P. Susheela – vocal
- Ramya Behara – chorus
- Mohana Bhogaraju – chorus
- Sekhar Master – choreographer
- Venkatesh Patvari – rhythm programmino
- Charles Berthoud – bass guitar
- Sandilya Pisapati – violin
- Santhosh – Indian rhythms
- Darren Vermaas – mastering engineer

=== Accolades ===
Award (Note: Awards, festivals and organizations are in alphabetical order.)	Date of ceremony (Note: Date is linked to the article about the awards held that year, wherever possible.)	Category	Recipient(s)	Result	Ref.
Santosham Film Awards	14 November 2021	Best Male Playback Singer	S. P. Balasubrahmanyam	Won	

=== Reception ===
"Elluvachi Godaramma" received positive reception from audiences, praising the music and lyrics, and became a huge success. After decades, the song was remixed in Telugu film Gaddalakonda Ganesh as "Elluvochi Godaramma". The song too received positive response and became chartbuster upon its release. ABP News reported that many complimented Hegde as new Sridevi. The Times of India listed the track in Top 5 Remix Songs in Tollywood article. Multiple news media reported audience to be dancing to the tunes of "Elluvochi Godaramma" in front of the theatre screens. The song was also replayed in the theatres with the request of fans.

K. Raghavendra Rao shared that Pooja Hegde was "splendid" in the song and said that the song was the one part of the film that he loved the most. In the success meet of the film F3: Fun and Frustration, Raghavendra Rao said that Tej and Hegde became popular with his "Binde song". The brass pots used in the song brought enormous fame to Ajjaram village. When Hegde saw the film in a theatre in Hyderabad, she admits to becoming quite emotional after seeing people dance when the song was played on screen. "To recreate a song that had Sridevi, a legend herself, in the original version, can get quite scary. There’s absolutely no room for error, and it's a big task to live up to the hype. I'm thrilled that people liked the song and my role in the film," she says.

== Other versions ==
1. "Elluvochi Godaramma - Cover" by Anushya Murugesh
2. "Elluvochchi Godaramma - Slap House Mix" by S VIII
3. "Elluvachi Godaramma - Tapori Mix" by DJ Pavan
4. "Elluvachi Godaramma - Dance Mix" by The Independeners
5. "Elluvachi Godaramma - Reggaeton Mix" by Abhishek Martyn
