= Phone Bhoot =

2022 Indian film by Gurmmeet Singh

- Theatrical Release Poster
- Directed by: Gurmmeet Singh
- Written by: Ravi Shankaran; Jasvinder Singh Bath
- Produced by: Ritesh Sidhwani; Farhan Akhtar
- Starring: Katrina Kaif; Ishaan Khatter; Siddhant Chaturvedi
- Cinematography: K. U. Mohanan
- Edited by: Manan Ashwin Mehta
- Music by: Songs: Tanishk Bagchi; Rochak Kohli; Mikey McCleary; Roy; Background Score: John Stewart Eduri
- Production company: Excel Entertainment
- Distributed by: AA Films
- Release date: 4 November 2022
- Running time: 136 minutes
- Country: India
- Language: Hindi
- Budget: ₹45 crore
- Box office: est. ₹18.73 crore

Phone Bhoot (transl. Phone Ghost) is a 2022 Indian Hindi-language supernatural comedy film directed by Gurmmeet Singh and produced by Farhan Akhtar and Ritesh Sidhwani under the banner of Excel Entertainment. The film stars Katrina Kaif, Ishaan Khattar, Siddhant Chaturvedi and Jackie Shroff. It was released theatrically on 4 November 2022 to mixed responses from the critics.

== Plot ==
Major and Gullu are two unemployed young men who aspire to become exorcists. They always pray to their close friend 'Raaka', a statue, to help alleviate their poverty. They decide to host a ghost-themed Halloween party. At midnight, Raaka's glowing eyes shut down. While attempting to repair it, Major and Gullu are electrocuted and enter the realm of the dead, where they meet Ragini, a benevolent ghost who promises to help them achieve their dream in return for a favour. Major and Gullu agree to the deal: to help depraved souls attain moksha (salvation) by exposing the criminals who wronged them in life. In return, Ragini will help Major and Gullu earn money.

Inspired by her, the duo start a "Phone Bhoot" company, and she assists them. Their business eventually grows and becomes famous. Atmaram, an evil tantrik, becomes jealous because Phone Bhoot is destroying his business and attempts to stop them, but his efforts are thwarted by Ragini. Atmaram learns that Ragini is none other than the deceased lover of the late king Raja Dushyant Singh. Both were murdered in a car crash orchestrated by Atmaram himself in order to end Dushyant's reign as king. In the present, Atmaram captures Ragini in a bottle during a lunar eclipse, when her powers are at their weakest. Major and Gullu feel deceived, realising that Ragini manipulated them in order to seek revenge on Atmaram. Dushyant's soul is now held captive by Atmaram in his treasury of magic bottles.

The duo are confronted by another benevolent ghost whom they had previously helped alongside Ragini. The ghost reveals that Ragini is in grave danger and requires their help in order to free many souls from Atmaram, including Dushyant's. Major and Gullu have a change of heart and confront Atmaram. They are soon joined by their now-animated Raaka and manage to free Ragini. Later, the other souls whom they have helped, liberated, or assisted in attaining salvation also join them in defeating Atmaram and casting him into the underworld's hellfire. Dushyant is finally freed. Ragini and Dushyant reunite in their metaphysical forms and assure Major and Gullu that they will help whenever needed.

The film ends with a hint at a sequel.

== Cast ==
- Katrina Kaif as Ragini Maheshwari
- Ishaan Khatter as Galileo Parthasarthy aka Gullu
- Siddhant Chaturvedi as Sherdil Shergill aka Major
- Naufal Azmir Khan as Raghu Jadhav
- Jackie Shroff as Atmaram Dhyani
- Sheeba Chadha as Chikni Chudail
- Nidhi Bisht as Lady Diana (Daayan)
- Omara Shetty as Lavanya
- Manu Rishi Chadha
- Armaan Ralhan as Dushyant Singh
- Pulkit Samrat as Hunny (cameo)
- Varun Sharma as Choocha (cameo)
- Manjot Singh as Lali (cameo)
- Manuj Sharma as Rahu
- Shrikant verma as Ketu
- Mohit Thakur as Jonny Dushman
- MD Abu Yousuf
- Vipul Deshpande as Mr.Kulkarni

== Soundtrack ==
Phone Bhoot

Soundtrack album by Tanishk Bagchi, Rochak Kohli, Mikey McCleary and Roy
- Released: 18 October 2022
- Recorded: 2021–2022
- Genre: Feature film soundtrack
- Length: 16:19
- Label: Zee Music Company

Official audio
- Phone Bhoot - Full Album on YouTube

Singles from Phone Bhoot
- 1. "Kinna Sona" Released: 13 October 2022; 2. "Kaali Teri Gutt" Released: 18 October 2022

The first song "Kinna Sona" released on 13 October 2022. Sung by Tanishk Bagchi and Zahrah S Khan. Lyrics and composed by Bagchi.

The second song "Kaali Teri Gut" released on 18 October 2022. Sung by Romy and Sakshi Holkar. Composed by Roy and lyrics by Kumaar.

The other songs was released as album on 18 October 2022. Third song "Phone Bhoot Theme" official video was released on 31 October 2022.

No.	Title	Lyrics	Music	Singer(s)	Length
1.	"Kinna Sona"	Tanishk Bagchi	Tanishk Bagchi	Tanishk Bagchi, Zahrah S. Khan	3:18
2.	"Kaali Teri Gutt"	Kumaar	Roy	Romy, Sakshi Holkar	3:17
3.	"Phone Bhoot Theme"	Baba Sehgal	Mikey McCleary	Baba Sehgal	3:07
4.	"Jaau Jaan Se"	Kumaar	Rochak Kohli	Rochak Kohli, Lisa Mishra	3:17
5.	"Jaau Jaan Se" (Chill Mix)	Kumaar	Rochak Kohli	Rochak Kohli, Lisa Mishra	3:20
Total length:					16:19

== Production ==
The principal photography commenced on 12 December 2020 in Mumbai.

== Reception ==
Phone Bhoot received mixed reviews from critics. On the review aggregator website Rotten Tomatoes, 33% of 12 critics' reviews are positive, with an average rating of 5/10.

Rachana Dubey of The Times of India rated the film 3.5 out of 5 stars and wrote "Gurmmeet Singh puts out a unique horror comedy which is a departure from most material one has seen in the year so far. For that itself this one deserves a visit to the theatre". Nairita Mukherjee of India Today rated the film 3.5 out of 5 stars and wrote "Phone Bhoot is heavily dependent on Katrina Kaif and she honestly does her best to pull the film. Where she fails, the makers have strategically placed Ishaan and Siddhant, both known for their spunky comic timing, to add a redbull boost". Devesh Sharma of Filmfare rated the film 3 out of 5 stars and wrote "Phone Bhoot is perhaps the silliest horror comedy you"ll ever see". Bollywood Hungama rated the film 3 out of 5 stars and wrote "Phone Bhoot has a fine first half with all the ingredients of a youthful, fun horror comedy. However, the second half could have been better. At the box office, the film will appeal to an audience who love horror comedies".

Soumyabrata Gupta of Times Now rated the film 3 out of 5 stars and wrote "Phone Bhoot is a trippy horror ride which could have done better with a few more episodes on the chopping block. Saibal Chatterjee of NDTV rated the film 2.5 out of 5 stars and wrote "Phone Booth isn't an earth-shattering, game-changing deal for the genre but it has the feel of a full-on mad hatters' party where everything goes". Pratikshya Mishra of The Quint rated the film 2.5 out of 5 stars and wrote "The film’s own, original comedy, rarely works except when stars like Jackie Shroff and Sheeba Chaddha are at work". Sukanya Verma of Rediff rated the film 2.5 out of 5 stars and wrote "Phone Bhoot would be a lot more memorable if it wasn't merely a costume ball doffing its hat at Hollywood, Bollywood, Fukrey, Thalaivaa, a heroine who drinks mango juice like few can or a hero who can't stop playing his flute". Sanyukta Thakare of Mashable rated the film 2.5 out of 5 stars and wrote "Phone Bhoot isn't the perfect choice, but it is worth a watch for a chill-out session when you are tipsy with your friends".
