= Bachchhan Paandey =

2022 Indian film by Farhad Samji

- Theatrical release poster
- Directed by: Farhad Samji
- Written by: Sajid Nadiadwala; Farhad Samji; Tushar Hiranandani; Sparsh Khetarpal; Tasha Bhambra; Zeishan Quadri
- Based on: Jigarthanda by Karthik Subbaraj
- Produced by: Sajid Nadiadwala
- Starring: Akshay Kumar; Kriti Sanon; Jacqueline Fernandez; Arshad Warsi
- Cinematography: Gavemic U. Ary
- Edited by: Charu Shree Roy
- Music by: Songs: Amaal Mallik; B Praak; Vikram Montrose; Jaani; Roy; Score: Julius Packiam
- Production company: Nadiadwala Grandson Entertainment
- Distributed by: AA Films
- Release date: 18 March 2022
- Running time: 146 minutes
- Country: India
- Language: Hindi
- Budget: est. ₹130 crore
- Box office: ₹73.17 crore

Bachchhan Paandey is a 2022 Indian Hindi-language action comedy film directed by Farhad Samji, produced by Sajid Nadiadwala. The film stars Akshay Kumar, Seema Biswas, Kriti Sanon, Arshad Warsi and Jacqueline Fernandez. Pankaj Tripathi, Prateik Babbar, Sanjay Mishra and Abhimanyu Singh play supporting roles. It is an official remake of the 2014 Tamil film Jigarthanda which itself was inspired by the 2006 South Korean film A Dirty Carnival.

The film was released theatrically on 18 March 2022 and received mixed-to-negative reviews from critics. It emerged as a box-office bomb.

== Plot ==
Myra Devekar, a budding director, is given a task by a producer to come up with a gripping and violent gangster story to produce a film. To satisfy the producer's commercial outlook and her hunger for making a realistic film, she decides to study the life of a real-life gangster for the script. Her extensive research leads to menacing one-eyed Bachchhan Paandey of Baghwa, a ruthless gangster surrounded by quirky yet scary henchmen.

Myra travels to Baghwa where she meets her best friend Vishu and tells him about her film idea on Bachchhan. Vishu gets furious and asks her to leave but is later persuaded to help her with the film. Both Vishu and Myra start to target Bachchhan's henchmen in an effort to get closer to him. Virgin, one of the goons, tells them about his former girlfriend Sophie, who was killed by the former. Vishu and Myra plant a microphone in Virgin's mobile phone to eavesdrop on his conversations with Bachchan.

Later, it is revealed that Virgin was betraying Bachchhan for another criminal Rana Lohia, but is caught and killed by him. Vishu and Myra listen to the murder through the microphone, but are caught by Bachchhan's gang. Bachchhan sets out to kill Vishu and Myra, but agrees to spare them when he discovers that Myra is directing a gangster film, under the condition that he plays the protagonist of the film. Myra initially doesn't accept, but Bachchhan kidnaps her producer, and Myra is forced to listen to his backstory to develop the script.

In a flashback, Bachchhan works for a corrupt politician Laalji Bhagat. After a fallout, the politician gets Bachchhan's girlfriend Sophie killed. In retaliation, Bachchhan murders Bhagat in the hospital where he was admitted for a wound.

Bachchhan and his goons do not know how to act, so they learn through Bhavesh Bhoplo, an acting coach. Bhavesh hits, threatens, and humiliates Bachchhan and his henchmen, much to their chagrin. Nevertheless, Myra dissuades them from harming Bhavesh for the sake of the film. Bachchan and Myra soon develop feelings for each other.

The film is eventually completed and released in the theatres. Bachchhan and his goons initially get excited and promote the film named BP, thinking it to be the gritty gangster drama that it was marketed as. To their horror, the film turns out to be a comedy that portrays them negatively. On the other hand, Myra's film is proved to be a major success and gets praise from her media and her director who used to often criticize her a lot. Bachchhan and the goons decide to kill her for making his terror among the people vanish but later on refrain as Bachchhan has a change of heart when his mother calls him after ten years and he attracts a fan following.

Later on, Bachchhan becomes a star and Kaandi, Bachchhan's close goon, gives up his habit of watching porn films. Vishu gets a lead role in an unnamed film. Pendulum (Bachchan's goon) who was married to his girlfriend Pinky (thanks to Bachchan) opens a dairy farm with her after closing his bar. Bhavesh Bhoplo becomes the best acting teacher, Bachchhan gets recognized as the best comedy actor, and Myra as the best director. Bachchan quits being a criminal and becomes an actor.

== Cast ==
- Akshay Kumar as Bachchhan Paandey
- Kriti Sanon as Myra Devekar
- Jacqueline Fernandez as Sophie
- Arshad Warsi as Vishwakant "Vishu" Mhatre
- Pankaj Tripathi as Guruji Bhavesh Bhoplo
- Prateik Babbar as Virgin
- Sanjay Mishra as Bufferiya
- Abhimanyu Singh as Pendulum
- Snehal Dabi as Jumbo
- Saharsh Kumar Shukla as Kaandi
- Ashwin Mushran as Producer Rakesh Verma
- Santosh Shukla as SP Suryakant Mishra
- Sajid Nadiadwala as film director
- Ahmed Khan as film director
- Aroosa Khan as Pinky
- Mohan Agashe as Minister Laalji Bhagat
- Seema Biswas as Bachchhan's mother
- Trishna Singh as Virgin's wife
- Surendra Rajan as Myra's father
- Dolly Thakore as crime reporter
- Nasir Abdullah as Myra's director
- Gaurav Chopra as Bheema
- Netram Tiwari as Bullet
- Sunil Pendurkar as Qadri
- Arun Khedwal as Guleria
- Vipul Roy as Anchor
- Abhishek Saxena as Journalist Abhinav Tripathi
- Amith Sivdas Nair as Rana
- Faiz khan as Bhaichand Bhatawde

== Production ==
=== Development ===
Bachchhan Paandey was initially incorrectly reported to be a remake of the Tamil film Veeram (2014), which was later remade in Hindi as Kisi Ka Bhai Kisi Ki Jaan (2023). Later sources reported that Bachchhan Paandey was actually a remake of the Tamil film Jigarthanda (2014).

The title derives from a character of the same name, played by Kumar, in the 2008 actioner Tashan. The title was initially spelled Bachchan Pandey but was later changed to Bachchhan Paandey.

=== Filming ===
Principal photography of the film was initially scheduled to begin in May 2020, but it was postponed due to COVID-19 lockdown in India. Pre-production restarted in October 2020, and eventually the filming commenced on 6 January 2021 in Jaisalmer. The film was wrapped up in July 2021.

== Music ==
Bachchhan Paandey

Soundtrack album by Amaal Mallik, B Praak, Jaani, Vikram Montrose and Roy
- Released: 17 March 2022
- Genre: Feature film soundtrack
- Length: 17:55
- Label: T-Series
- Producer: Bhushan Kumar

Official audio
- Bachchhan Paandey – Full Album on YouTube

The film's music is composed by Amaal Mallik, B Praak, Jaani, Vikram Montrose and Roy while lyrics are written by Kumaar, Jaani, Farhad Bhiwandiwala, Vikram Montrose and Azeem Dayani. The film's background score is composed by Julius Packiam. The song "Saare Bolo Bewafa" and "Meri Jaan Meri Jaan" gained popularity.

Track listing
No.	Title	Lyrics	Music	Singer(s)	Length
1.	"Maar Khayegaa"	Farhad Bhiwandiwala, Vikram Montrose, Azeem Dayani	Vikram Montrose	Farhad Bhiwandiwala, Vikram Montrose	3:18
2.	"Meri Jaan Meri Jaan"	Jaani	B Praak	B Praak	4:08
3.	"Saare Bolo Bewafa"	Jaani	Jaani	B Praak	3:46
4.	"Heer Ranjhana"	Kumaar	Amaal Mallik	Arijit Singh, Shreya Ghoshal	4:00
5.	"Whistle Theme"	Instrumental	Roy	Instrumental	2:43
Total length:					17:55

== Release ==
=== Theatrical ===
In July 2019, Bachchhan Paandey was announced with the release date of Christmas 2020. However, it was later pushed to 22 January 2021 due to Aamir Khan's request to avert clash with Laal Singh Chaddha. As the COVID-19 delayed production, it was postponed to 26 January 2022 and then to 4 March 2022. The film was finally released theatrically on 18 March 2022, Holi.

=== Home media ===
The film began streaming on Amazon Prime Video from 15 April 2022.

== Reception ==
=== Box office ===
Bachchhan Paandey earned ₹13.25 crore at the domestic box office on its opening day. On the second day, the film collected ₹12 crore. On the third day, the film collected ₹12 crore, taking total domestic weekend collection to ₹37.25 crore.

As of 24 March 2022, the film grossed ₹59.5 crore in India and ₹13.67 crore overseas, for a worldwide gross collection of ₹73.17 crore. The film faced heavy competition from The Kashmir Files, which was released one week earlier, and caused it to tumble at the box office.

Bachchhan Paandey made on a budget of around ₹180 crore, recovered ₹115 crore from non-theatrical revenues, and the remaining ₹65 crore was recovered from the boxoffice gross.

=== Critical response ===
Upon release, Bachchhan Paandey received mixed-to-negative reviews from critics. A critic from Bollywood Hungama rated the film 3.5/5 stars and wrote "Bachchhan Paandey is a must watch for the fans of Akshay Kumar and masala cinema." Ronak Kotecha of The Times of India gave the film 2.5 out of 5 stars and called it "a chaotic mess of quirky and clichéd characters".

Saibal Chatterjee of NDTV rated the film 1.5 out of 5 stars and wrote "Bachchhan Paandey is a bewildering melee of a film in which the fundamental cinematic principles have been mercilessly mauled. It rides solely and squarely on the starry, over-the-top presence of Akshay Kumar." Sonil Dedhia of News18 reviewed the film and opined "Arshan Warsi and Kriti Sanon are the only saving graces of this otherwise shoddy movie. The film arbitrarily packs in elements of every genre without actually bothering to stop and see if the mix does work and ends up like an overcooked stew."

Shubhra Gupta of Indian Express rated the film 1 out 5 stars and highlighted "Nothing about this Akshay Kumar-Kriti Sanon film reaches the level of hilarity plus inspired lunacy of the original, Jigarthanda." Anuj Kumar of The Hindu reviewed the film and opined "Director Farhad Samji has imbued Karthik Subbaraj's dark-shaded quirky Tamil comedy with the soul of a Sajid Khan film... and the result is underwhelming. A laboured adaptation of 'Jigarthanda,' the film misses the target."

Monica Rawal Kukreja of Hindustan Times termed her review as "Bachchhan Paandey, as a whole, is a masala flick, which Akshay Kumar fans can't complain about. But, with an interesting plot at hand, it could have been much better." Devesh Sharma of Filmfare rated the film 2.6 out of 5 stars and wrote "Bachchhan Panday is a case of opportunity missed. It survives because of Akshay and Kriti. Both deserve to be cast in a better film together."
