= Roy (singer) =

Indian singer and music director (born 1992)

- Born: Haridwar, India
- Genres: Bhangra, hip hop, Indi-pop
- Occupations: Singer, Music Producer, Music Director, Sound Engineer, Mix-Master Engineer.
- Years active: 2016–present
- Labels: T-Series; Zee Music Company

Roy is an Indian singer, sound engineer, and music director.

== Career ==
Roy collaborated with the Lyricist and director, Sheel, and released his debut single "Bunty Bubbly", a fusion of Hindi and Haryanvi in February 2017 with T-Series.

Later in the same year, Roy released his second single "Roothe yaar". This song was directed by director Sheel and was released on T-Series.

In 2018, the single "Raanjhnaa" was released, featuring a music video both written and directed by Sheel. The song was released by T-Series on 18 April 2018.

== Discography ==
Year	Title	Label	Ref
2023	Haye Ve Haye		
2023	Haye Ni		
2023	Gunaah		
2023	Bandaa Title Track (from "Sirf Ek Bandaa Kaafi Hai")	Zee5	
2022	Akhiyaan		
2022	Us		
2022	Maahi Sohna		
2022	Admirer		
2022	Background Score for Mister Mummy		
2022	Bachchhan Paandey Instrumental for Bachchhan Paandey		
2022	Kaali Teri Gutt (from "Phone Bhoot")		
2018	Raanjhnaa	T-Series	
2017	Roothe Yaar	T-Series	
2017	Bunty Bubbly	T-Series	
