= Mister Mummy =

2022 Indian film by Shaad Ali

- Theatrical release poster
- Directed by: Shaad Ali
- Written by: Ananya Sharma
- Produced by: Bhushan Kumar; Krishan Kumar; Siva Ananth; Shaad Ali
- Starring: Ritesh Deshmukh; Genelia D'Souza
- Cinematography: Sunita Radia
- Edited by: Vaishnavi Krishnan
- Music by: Songs: Rochak Kohli; Sneha Khanwalkar; Background Score: Roy
- Production companies: T-Series Films; Hectic Cinema; Bound Script Pictures
- Release date: 18 November 2022
- Country: India
- Language: Hindi

Mister Mummy is a 2022 Indian Hindi-language comedy drama film directed by Shaad Ali starring Riteish Deshmukh in the title role and Genelia D'Souza. The story involves a man who becomes pregnant. The film received highly negative reviews.

== Cast ==
- Riteish Deshmukh as Amol Khote
- Genelia D'Souza as Gugloo Khote
- Prakash Raj as Dr Satyam Satsangi
- Mahesh Manjrekar as Dr. Rampal Satsangi / Dr. Lakhanpal Satsangi (Double Role)
- Ila Arun as Kavita
- Rakesh Bedi as Toni
- Kiran Juneja as Koni
- Guddi Maruti as Burnol
- Leo Franky as Mike
- Karishma Kotak as Pushpa

== Production ==
The film began production in March 2022.

== Soundtrack ==
All lyrics are written by Kumaar.

Track listing
No.	Title	Music	Singer(s)	Length
1.	"Chupke Chupke"	Rochak Kohli	Rochak Kohli, Armaan Malik, Shilpa Rao	5:16
2.	"Papaji Pet Se"	Sneha Khanwalkar	Amit Gupta, Sneha Khanwalkar	2:50
3.	"Mister Mummy (Title Track)"	Sneha Khanwalkar	Amit Gupta, Harjot Kaur, Sneha Khanwalkar	2:27
4.	"Rut Mastani"	Sneha Khanwalkar	Harjot Kaur, Sneha Khanwalkar	2:23
5.	"Uncle Ji"	Sneha Khanwalkar	Jakir Hussen, Jasu Khan, Sneha Khanwalkar	3:19
6.	"Chupke Chupke" (Film Version)	Rochak Kohli	Rochak Kohli, Armaan Malik, Shilpa Rao	4:58
Total length:				15:56

== Reception ==
Mister Mummy received negative reviews from audiences.

A critic from The Times of India wrote that "All things considered, Mister Mummy could have explored a lot more with the material at hand. But Shaad Ali ends up losing out on this opportunity. Definitely not worth watching". A critic from Rediff.com wrote that "The film is neither a comedy ... nor an emotional drama of an estranged couple still in love". A critic from The Quint wrote that "Yet another mediocre Bollywood slapstick comedy that is nothing but repackaged queerphobia".

== Controversy ==
In 2019, Kolkata-based producer Akash Chatterjee told T-Series the story of Vicky Pet Se, which he wanted to star Ayushmann Khurrana. T-Series had agreed to co-produce the film. Mister Mummy has the same storyline as his script but Chatterjee argues that he did not get due credit. The poster of Mister Mummy is also similar to a poster of Vicky Pet Se.
