= Dilmaar =

2025 Indian Kannada film by M Chandramouli

- Theatrical release poster
- Directed by: M Chandramouli
- Written by: M Chandramouli
- Produced by: Nagaraj Bhadravati
- Starring: Ram Gowda; Aditi Prabhudeva; Dimple Hayathi; P. Sai Kumar
- Cinematography: Thanvik G
- Edited by: Shashank Muralidharan
- Music by: Score: Praddyottan; Songs: Radhan
- Production company: Sri Vigneshwara Cinemas
- Release date: 24 October 2025
- Running time: 144 minutes
- Country: India
- Language: Kannada

Dilmaar is a 2025 Indian Kannada-language romantic drama film written and directed by M Chandramouli. The film features Ram Gowda, Aditi Prabhudeva, Dimple Hayathi and P. Sai Kumar in important roles.

The film was released on 24 October 2025.

== Cast ==
- Ram Gowda as Psycho Shukla
- Aditi Prabhudeva as Akshara
- Dimple Hayathi as Maya
- P. Sai Kumar as Bhargav
- Sharath Lohithaswa as Shaane Gowda
- Ashok
- Raghu
- Govinde Gowda
- Divya
- Kumuda
- Shekar
- Dhool Prakash
- Narendra
- Srivi
- Manju Hassan
- Naveendra

== Music ==
The background score is composed by Praddyottan, while the songs were composed by Radhan.

All music is composed by Radhan.

Track listing
No.	Title	Lyrics	Singer(s)	Length
1.	"Naan Yaaro"	M Chandramouli	Santhosh Venky	3:55
2.	"Neenillade"	Keshav V G	Sarath Santosh	4:58

== Release and reception ==
Dilmaar was released on 24 October 2025.

Y Maheshwara Reddy of Bangalore Mirror rated it 3 out of 5 and noted the performances of the lead cast. A Sharadhaa of Cinema Express rated it 2.5 out of 5 and stated "Dilmaar aims to depict how love can drive a man to madness, but at times, it prioritises style over substance".
