= Ramabanam =

- Theatrical release poster
- Directed by: Sriwass
- Screenplay by: Sriwass
- Dialogues by: Madhusudhan Padamati
- Story by: Bhupathi Raja
- Produced by: T. G. Vishwa Prasad; Vivek Kuchibhotla
- Starring: Gopichand; Dimple Hayathi; Jagapathi Babu; Khushbu
- Cinematography: Vetri Palanisamy
- Edited by: Prawin Pudi
- Music by: Mickey J. Meyer
- Production company: People Media Factory
- Release date: 5 May 2023
- Running time: 139 minutes
- Country: India
- Language: Telugu

Ramabanam (transl. Lord Rama's Arrow) is a 2023 Indian Telugu-language culinary action drama film directed by Sriwass from a story written by Bhupathi Raja. It stars an ensemble cast featuring Gopichand, Dimple Hayathi, Jagapathi Babu, Nassar, Vennela Kishore, Tarun Arora and Sachin Khedekar. The soundtrack and background score were composed by Mickey J. Meyer.

Ramabanam was released on 5 May 2023 where it received mixed to negative reviews from critics and bombed at the box office.

== Plot ==
Rajaram runs a restaurant who lives with his wife Bhuvaneshwari, younger brother Vikram “Vicky” and the rest of their family. While Rajaram believes in a peaceful, law-abiding lifestyle, Vicky is rebellious in situations where they face injustice. After a disagreement with a rival restaurateur named Paparao, Vicky burns down Paparao's house, where Rajaram attempts to force Vicky to surrender to the police. This results in Vicky escaping from his hometown to Kolkata. Years later, Vicky is a renowned gangster in Kolkata under his adoptive father Guptha and falls in love with a girl named Bhairavi, who too reciprocates his feelings. However, Bhairavi's father refuses to accept the union as he believes Vicky is an orphan. Vicky takes Bhairavi to Hyderabad to meet his family.

Being unaware of Vicky's status as a gangster and rejoiced at his return after years, the family wholeheartedly accepts the relationship. At this juncture, Vicky discovers that his family is under the threat of GK, a renowned food manufacturer and the son-in-law of Paparao. GK is at loggerheads with Rajaram, who publicly insulted GK Foods and attempted to expose the adulteration practices in the organization. In retaliation, GK orchestrated the poisoning of a batch of food that was donated by Rajaram to an orphanage, rendering the children who consumed it hospitalized and fighting for their lives. Rajaram is under the threat of being imprisoned at any given moment, but had instructed the family to maintain a facade in front of Vicky.

Realizing about the issues, Vicky takes it upon himself to retaliate and slowly starts eliminating the various hurdles posed by GK, including the resumption of Rajaram's daughter's wedding which GK had managed to cancel as well as thwarting multiple attacks orchestrated against the family. Rajaram and the rest of the family remain blissfully unaware of Vicky's actions. Bhairavi's family arrives in Hyderabad and fixes her engagement with Vicky. Vicky closes in on Bailuraju, who is their family associate and GK's payroll, who was also responsible for the poisoning of the food consumed by the children. However, GK brings Vicky's rival Mukherjee to kill Bailuraju. While thwarting Mukherjee's goons, Vicky is unable to save Bailuraju, who dies despite promising Vicky that he would turn approver.

The fight is witnessed by Rajaram, who discovers Vicky's true profession. He throws Vicky out of the house and cancels the marriage. On the day of the court hearing, GK has Rajaram and the children from the hospital kidnapped with the intent of rendering Rajaram as a fugitive and killing all of them. Vicky is able to locate Rajaram, but is subdued by GK and his goons. Realizing what Vicky has done for them, Rajaram retaliates and helps Vicky fight off the goons while saving the children. They arrive in court, where the court is made aware of GK's activities with the help of a scientist who worked in GK's organization and discovered the immoral methods used by GK to manufacture food as well as a video confession from Bailuraju prior to his death. GK and Paparao are sentenced to prison, while Vicky reunites with his family.

== Cast ==
- Gopichand as Vikram 'Vicky'/Ramabanam
- Jagapathi Babu as V. Rajaram, Vicky’s brother
- Dimple Hayathi as Bhairavi, Vicky’s love-interest
- Khushbu as Bhuvaneshwari, Rajaram's wife
- Kushitha Kallapu as Janani, Rajaram's daughter
- Nassar as Paparao, Rajaram’s rival
- Tarun Arora as GK, Paparao’s son-in-law, International businessman
- Adv Krishnan Venugopal (Kriss Venugopal) as Mukherjee, Guptha’s rival
- Ronson Vincent as Mukherjee's Son
- Vennela Kishore as Savitri
- Sachin Khedekar as Shukla, Bhairavi's father
- Satya as Ajju
- Ali as Purushottam, Bhuvaneshwari’s brother
- Raja Ravindra as Ravindra, GK’s assistant
- Getup Srinu as Vijju
- Dinesh Mangaluru as Guptha, Vicky’s adoptive father & business partner
- Niharika as Bhairavi’s mother
- Y. Kasi Viswanath as Bhairavi’s uncle
- Saptagiri as Bhairavi’s cousin
- Subhalekha Sudhakar as Suryanarayana 'Suridu' (Rajaram and Vicky’s uncle)
- Bharath Reddy as Mahesh, food scientist
- Rajitha as Vicky’s relative
- Sameer Hasan as Defense lawyer
- Uma Mahesh as Prabhakar, opposition lawyer
- CVL Narasimha Murthy as Judge
- Appaji Ambarisha Darbha as Kalighat resident
- Vadlamani Srinivas as Janani’s father-in-law

== Music ==
The music for the film was composed by Mickey J. Meyer.

Ramabanam

Soundtrack album by Mickey J. Meyer
- Released: 2023
- Recorded: 2022–2023
- Genre: Feature film soundtrack
- Length: 13:35
- Language: Telugu
- Label: Sony Music South
- Producer: Mickey J. Meyer

Mickey J. Meyer chronology
Shyam Singha Roy (2021)	Ramabanam (2023)	Anni Manchi Sakunamule (2023)

Track listing
No.	Title	Lyrics	Singer(s)	Length
1.	"iPhone Song"	Kasarla Shyam	Ram Miriyala, Mohana Bhogaraju	3:23
2.	"Dharuveyy Ra"	Ramajogayya Sastry	Krishna Tejasvi, Chaitra Ambadipudi	3:55
3.	"Nuvve Nuvve"	Shreemani	Ritesh G. Rao	3:05
4.	"Monalisa Monalisa"	Bhaskarabhatla Ravi Kumar	Sri Krishna, Geetha Madhuri	3:12
Total length:				13:35

== Release ==
The film was released on 5 May 2023.

=== Home media ===
The film began streaming via Netflix on 14 September 2023.

== Reception ==
Ramabanam received mixed to negative reviews from critics.

=== Critical response ===
Neeshitha Nyayapati of The Times of India wrote "Ramabanam's biggest flaw has to be that it has nothing new to offer, and what it does offer is plain boring". Bhuvanesh Chandar of The Hindu wrote "Director Sriwass’ film fails in its attempt to ‘package’ a commercial entertainer, only to squander any potential its intriguing plotline had; to make matters worse, it also has queerphobic jokes."

Abhilasha Cherukuri of Cinema Express gave 2.5 out of 5 stars and wrote "While some aspects in the film clearly work against its favour, be it the three unmemorable romantic numbers shot in vaguely international locations or its unconvincing, miscast antagonists, Rama Banam also falters heavily due to its largely counterproductive approach of elevating its hero without enough conflict or consequences." Srivathsan Nadadhur of OTTplay gave 2 out of 5 stars and wrote "Ramabanam is a jaded commercial entertainer that is tolerable initially but loses izz post the intermission. Gopichand does the needful but the writer and the director don’t do much to infuse life into a tried-and-tested template around two brothers."

Ram Venkat Srikar of Film Companion wrote "Ramabanam needed so many such dramatic moments that go beyond the artificiality of the characters and drama. At one point, a character jokingly compliments that Rajaram's house looks as good as a shooting location. That's because it is indeed a shooting location and it looks exactly like one; the staging of scenes, by populating the frame with actors who barely utter a dialogue renders many sequences painfully artificial."
