= Devatha (1982 film) =

- Theatrical release poster
- Directed by: K. Raghavendra Rao
- Produced by: D. Rama Naidu
- Starring: Sobhan Babu; Sridevi; Jaya Prada; Mohan Babu
- Music by: K. Chakravarthy
- Production company: Suresh Productions
- Release date: 4 September 1982
- Language: Telugu

Devatha (transl. Goddess) is a 1982 Indian Telugu-language film directed by K. Raghavendra Rao, starring Sobhan Babu, Sridevi, Jaya Prada and Mohan Babu. The film was produced by D. Rama Naidu on Suresh Productions banner. The film is about two sisters and their love triangle with a man. K. Raghavendra Rao remade the film in Hindi as Tohfa (1984), with both Sridevi and Jaya Prada reprising their roles. It was also remade in Tamil as Deiva Piravi (1985).

== Cast ==
- Sobhan Babu as Rambabu
- Sridevi as Lalitha
- Jaya Prada as Janaki
- Mohan Babu as Kamesam
- Rao Gopal Rao as Narasayya
- Nagesh
- Sarathi
- C. H. Krishnamurthy
- Chidathala Appa Rao
- Telephone Satyanarayana
- Pushpalatha
- Nirmalamma
- Rama Prabha
- Mamatha
- Girija Rani
- Master Suresh
- Master Ali
- Dubbing Janaki

== Production ==
The story drew inspiration from the 1959 Tamil film Kalyana Parisu, directed by C. V. Sridhar, who also directed its Hindi remake, Nazrana, (1961) starring Raj Kapoor and Vyjayanthimala and the 1960 Telugu movie Pelli Kanuka. The dialogues were written by Satyanand. The song "Elluvache Godaramma" was shot at Godavari, Pedapatnam.

== Music ==
K. Chakravarthy composed the film's music. The song "Elluvachi Godaramma" was remixed for the movie Gaddalakonda Ganesh as "Elluvochi Godaramma".

Song	Singer(s)	Duration
"Elluvachhi"	S. P. Balasubrahmanyam; P. Susheela	5:05
"Cheera Kattindhi"	S. P. Balasubrahmanyam; P. Susheela	4:00
"Kudikannu Kotagane"	S. P. Balasubrahmanyam; P. Susheela	4:24
"Challagali Cheppindhi"	S. P. Balasubrahmanyam; P. Susheela, S. P. Sailaja	4:31
"Yendavana"	S. P. Balasubrahmanyam; P. Susheela	4:41
