= P. Susheela =

Indian singer (born 1935)

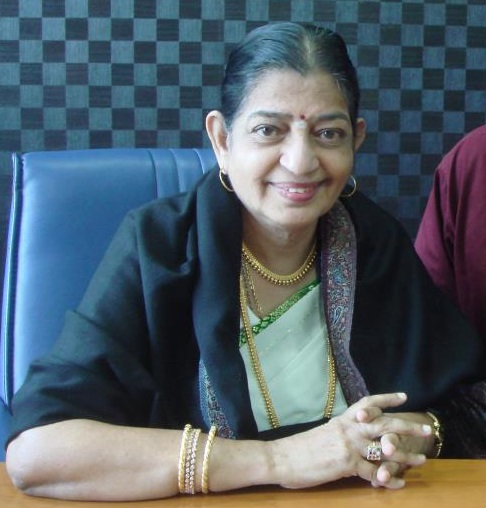
- Susheela in 2014
- Born: Pulapaka Susheela; 13 November 1935 (age 90); Vizianagaram, Vizianagaram Estate, British India (present-day Andhra Pradesh, India)
- Other names: Evergreen Nightingale of Indian cinema Melody Queen; Kannada Kogile
- Education: Andhra University
- Occupations: Singer; musician
- Years active: 1953–present
- Known for: Playback singing; Guinness Book of World Records for singing most songs in Indian languages
- Spouse: Mohan Rao (m. 1957; died 1990)
- Children: 1
- Awards: Full list
- Honours: Kalaimaamani (1991); Raghupathi Venkaiah Award (2002); Gaana Saraswathi (2004); Padma Bhushan (2008); J. Jayalalithaa Special Kalaimamani Award (2019)
- Musical career
- Genres: Indian classical music; Playback singing; Filmi; Carnatic
- Instruments: Vocals, Veena
- Website: psusheela.org

Pulapaka Susheela (13 November 1935) is an Indian playback singer associated with the South Indian cinema for over six decades and is referred to as the "Evergreen Nightingale of Indian cinema". She is one of the best-known playback singers in India. She has been recognized by the Guinness Book of World Records as well as by the Asia Book of Records for performing a record number of songs in different Indian languages. She is also the recipient of five National Film Award for Best Female Playback Singer and the first woman playback singer to receive the national award. She also has received numerous state awards. Susheela is widely acclaimed as a singer who defined feminism in South Indian cinema and is well known for her mellifluous vocal performances for over 40,000 (counted as per records) film and devotional songs across Indian languages in films, albums, TV and radio. Her songs include solos, duets, chorus and title tracks, including Telugu, Tamil, Kannada, Malayalam, Hindi, Sanskrit, Odia, Tulu, Urdu, Punjabi, Badaga, Bengali, Konkani, and English. She has been active in the music industry since 1951.

The song "Naalai Intha Velai" from Tamil film Uyarndha Manidhan brought her the first award at the 16th National Film Awards, by winning her the National Film Award for Best Female Playback Singer in 1969. Susheela became the first female singer in the country to win the national award. She is also considered one of the rich voiced singers whose pronunciation of the syllables are to be very clear and precise in any of the languages she sang. In a career spanning more than six decades, she has recorded songs in various Indian languages including Tamil, Telugu, Kannada, Malayalam, Hindi, Bengali, Odia, Sanskrit, Tulu, and Badaga. She has also sung for Sinhalese films. Her mother tongue is Telugu. She can also speak Tamil fluently, with a little knowledge of Hindi, Malayalam and Kannada.

== Personal life ==
Susheela was born in present day Andhra Pradesh, India, as the daughter of Pulapaka Mukunda Rao, a leading advocate in Vizianagaram, Vizianagaram District, Andhra Pradesh State.

She married Dr. Mohan Rao, who died in 1990; they have a son named Jayakrishna. Her niece, Sandhya Jayakrishna, who later became her daughter-in-law, is a singer who debuted with A. R. Rahman in Iruvar. Her brother Ramachandra Rao also was a singer who sang the evergreen Kannada song Doni Sagali with S. Janaki for the film Miss Leelavathi. Susheela has two granddaughters, one of whom, Shuba Sri, is the lead guitarist with music director Thaman S.

== Education ==
After schooling, Susheela joined Maharaja's Music College under the tutelage of Dwaram Venkataswamy Naidu who was the Principal, in Vizianagaram, and completed Diploma in Music from Andhra University in First Class.

P. Susheela went on to become the most successful playback singer of South India from 1950 to 1990.

== Career ==
=== Debut: 1951–1954 ===
Born into a music-loving family, Susheela had been nurtured with formal classical music training at a very young age. She used to participate in all the musical competitions at her school and Vizianagaram town events. She developed the crucial nuances in singing songs with apt expressions and modulations through her extensive training during those days. She also sang a few songs for the All India Radio (AIR) for their private program telecasts.

In 1951, music director Pendyala Nageswara Rao was on the look out for some fresh voices to sing for his new film compositions. He approached the AIR to help him shortlist some of the finest singers who have performed for the Radio. AIR sent forward five singers of whom Susheela was selected after some thorough audition tests. She was immediately signed on for the Tamil film Petra Thai (1953) for a duet song "Edhuku Azhaithhai" with A. M. Raja. This was subsequently made in Telugu as Kanna Talli for which she recorded the same duet with Ghantasala. This resulted in her long term employment with AVM Studios singing for their productions alone with a fixed monthly salary. The studio owner A. V. Meiyappan hired a Tamil trainer for Susheela to hone her Tamil pronunciation skills. Thus Susheela began her illustrious career gaining abundant knowledge about music and language. She debuted into Kannada language with the film Maadidunno Maaraya in 1954.

=== Breakthrough: 1955–1960 ===
It was not easy for a newcomer to foray into the musical scene in the 1950s with the domination of eminent female vocalists like P. Leela, M. L. Vasanthakumari, Jikki among others ruling the playback industry. Yet, Susheela made her own mark with her distinct and clear vocals. The year 1955 saw Susheela rising to popularity with her back to back hit songs both in Tamil and Telugu film industries. Missamma released in 1955 had hugely popular songs backed with strong carnatic classical essence. Susheela created a huge impact among the listeners with her effortless renditions of the toughest notations. The same year released Tamil film Kanavane Kan Kanda Deivam made her a household name in Tamil Nadu.

Susheela, who sang in most of the films produced since 1955 through 1960s and 1970s till 1985. The Tamil musicians Viswanathan – Ramamurthy duo composed some of the most evergreen songs of Tamil cinema history in the voice of Susheela. Her duets with the acclaimed singers Ghantasala in Telugu, T. M. Soundararajan in Tamil and P. B. Srinivas in Kannada marked a new era of duet songs in the South Indian music industry. She, along with T. M. Soundararajan went on to record hundreds of songs with Viswanathan – Ramamurthy. Susheela's blockbuster Kannada song "Viraha Nooru Nooru Taraha" for the film Edakallu Guddada Mele is listed as one of the top 10 evergreen songs in Indian cinema. Her combination with actress Jayanthi became quite popular in Karnataka.

=== Successful domination: 1960–1985 ===
The early 1960s saw Susheela grow as an undisputed lead female singer across all the south Indian language films putting all the older veteran singers to the background. The year 1960 saw Susheela entering the Malayalam films with the V. Dakshinamurthy compositions for the film Seetha. From then, she went on to record numerous hit songs with all the Malayalam composers like G. Devarajan, M. K. Arjunan among others. She recorded many Malayalam duets with the veteran singer K. J. Yesudas. Her association with M.S. Viswanathan continued even after M.S.V split up with Ramamoorthy in 1965 and under M.S.V her duets with T.M. Sounderrajan and others and her solo songs were very popular with the audience and made her first choice singer for every other music composer and film producer from 1960 to 1985. M.S.V.'s composition fetched her the first National Film Award for Best Female Playback Singer in 1969 for her prolific rendition of "Naalai Intha Velai Paarthu" for the Tamil film Uyarndha Manidhan. The same song got her the Tamil Nadu State Award as well. Thereby, Susheela became one of the first recipients of the most dignified National awards in India. It was during these years the Nightingale of India, Lata Mangeshkar developed a strong friendship with Susheela and praised her works frequently. Her work in the Telugu film Chandipriya is superb with song "Sri Bhagya Rekha - Janani Janani" with Jaya Prada's superb dance. M.S.Viswanathan is regarded as her mentor and in his music direction she has maximum popular hit songs from 1955 to 1995.

The 1970s also saw Susheela in her prime form winning almost all the awards both nationally and in all the four states of Southern India. She also recorded Hindi songs during this period with music directors like KV Mahadevan, Laxmikant Pyarelal, L. Vaidyanathan and Laxmi Kiran, S.L. Manohar, Ajit merchant, G. Devarajan and S.N. Tripathi. It was in this era that she sang a few notable songs for another prolific Indian music director Ilaiyaraja. Though Janaki took a leading position from 1980 with her strong association with M.S.V and Ilaiyaraja, Susheela continued to be at the top till 1985 and after 1985 was still opted by several music directors for her legendary vocals. After 1986, she became selective about film songs and continued to have hit film songs till 2005.

=== Shift to non-films: 1985–2000s ===
With S. Janaki and Vani Jayaram taking over the Southern film songs center stage from 1985 and K. S. Chitra beginning her career, Susheela slowly shifted her focus from films to devotionals and light music. But she continued to sing melodious film songs from 1984 to 1999 though she had after 1985 cut down on offers for singing in films. She even won awards for songs in Telugu films – Viswanatha Nayakudu in 1987, Godavari Pongindi in 1989 and Tamil film Varam in 1989. She sang duets in Hindi with Kishore Kumar in 1986 for the film Singhasan – "Chalta Hai Do Dilon Ka Kaise Sansaar" and "Tere Liye Maine Janam" which became popular. She also concentrated more on stage shows across the Globe where many associations worldwide invited her to perform for their organised shows. She recorded more than 1000 devotional songs for various audio companies. In 1988, acclaimed music composer Naushad insisted her to sing "Janaki Jaane" for his Malayalam film Dhwani. She also recorded a few of her career best songs for Illayaraja, A. R. Rahman and others in the 1990s. "Kannukku Mai Azhagu" from the film Pudhiya Mugam (1993) composed by Rahman was praised all over for its lyrical content and rendition. She had hit songs in Tamil till 2005 and sang many devotional and folk songs from 1986 to 2005 and did many live shows from 1990 to 2015.

=== Comeback: 2005–present ===
Susheela made a comeback by rendering her voice to her own song Raksha Raksha Jaganmatha which was released 72 years ago and was released as a single for the movie, Aadai, starring Amala Paul. Susheela also recorded a Tamil song for the film 'LKG' in 2018, alongside Vani Jayaram & L.R.Eswari. Her superhit song 'Elluvochi' from the Telugu film 'Devatha' was reprised in her own voice for the film Gaddalakonda Ganesh in 2019 under Mickey J Meyer's supervision.

== P. Susheela Trust ==
The P. Susheela Trust, formed in 2008, has a monthly pension payment scheme and a few musicians in need are being benefited through it. On every 13 November there would be a musical concert during which a senior artist(s) chosen by a panel is conferred with the Lifetime Achievement award and the P Susheela Trust award. The proceedings of the concert would go towards the Trust maintenance.

The Lifetime achievement awards so far have been conferred upon T. M. Soundararajan and P. B. Srinivas. The recipients of the Trust's awards so far are S. Janaki, Vani Jairam, L. R. Eswari, P. Jayachandran, S. P. Balasubrahmanyam and K. J. Yesudas.

== Guinness World Records ==
As verified on 28 January 2016, Susheela has reportedly recorded up to 17,695 solo, duet and chorus backed songs in over six Indian languages since the 1960s, not counting some lost early recordings. She has now been recognized by both the Guinness Book of World Records and Asia Book of Records for singing most songs in Indian languages.

== Statistics ==
=== Telugu ===
Susheela has sung thousands of songs in Telugu. S. P. Balasubrahmanyam's first duet in Telugu was with P. Susheela. She won three national awards for Telugu songs.

=== Tamil ===
She has sung thousands of songs in Tamil, including devotionals. She has sung many duets with T. M. Soundara Rajan and has rendered hundreds of songs in MSV music. She won two national awards for Tamil songs.

=== Kannada ===
Susheela has recorded thousands of songs in Kannada. She has performed numerous duets with Ghantasala and P. B. Srinivas, and also a few duets with legendary actor and singer Dr. Rajkumar. Her duets with P. B. Srinivas are considered some of the evergreen songs of Kannada Film Industry. S. P. Balasubramaniam's first Kannada song Kanasido Nanasido from Nakkare Ade Swarga was a duet with Susheela.

=== Malayalam ===
She has sung more than 500 songs in Malayalam. The musician Devarajan gave her more than 300 songs (in all languages).

=== Other languages ===
Susheela has sung more than 300 songs in other languages, including 100 film songs in Hindi, 120 devotional songs in Sanskrit, and 9 film songs in Sinhalese. She has also sung in Bengali, Punjabi, Tulu, Baduga, and Oriya languages.

== Awards ==
=== Civilian and State Government honours ===
Year	Award	Honouring Body
1991	Kalaimamani	Government of Tamil Nadu
2004	Raghupathi Venkaiah Award	Government of Andhra Pradesh
2004	Gaana Saraswathi	Government of Karnataka
2008	Padma Bhushan	Government of India
2019	J. Jayalalithaa Special Kalaimamani Award	Government of Tamil Nadu
2024	Kalaignar Ninaivu Kalaithurai Vithagar Award	Government of Tamil Nadu

=== National Film Awards ===
She was the first recipient of the national award for female playback singing in 1969.

Year	Movie	Song	Language
1969	Uyarndha Manithan	Naalai Intha Velai Parthu	Tamil
1971	Savaale Samali	Chittuk Kuruvikkenna Kattuppaadu	Tamil
1978	Siri Siri Muvva	Jummandi Naadham	Telugu
1982	Meghasandesam	Aakulo Aakunai	Telugu
1983	M. L. A. Yedukondalu	Entha Beeda Vade	Telugu

=== Filmfare Awards South ===
- Filmfare Lifetime Achievement Award – South (2006)

=== State Awards ===
Year	Award	Movie	Song
1969	Tamil Nadu State Award	Uyarntha Manithan/Lakshmi Kalyanam	"Paal Polave Vaan" / "Brindavanathukku"
1971	Kerala State Award	Oru Penninte Katha	"Poonthen Aruvi Ponmudi Puzhayude"
1975	Kerala State Award	Chuvanna Sandyakal	"Poovukalku Punya Kaalam"
1977	Nandi Award	Daana Veera Soora Karna	"Kalagantino Swamy"
1978	Nandi Award	Naalaaga Endaro	"Kalyanini Kanulunna Manusuku Kanipinchu"
1981	Tamil Nadu State Award	Anbulla Athaan	"Aazhakkadal Neenthi Vanthen"
1982	Nandi Award	Meghasandesam	"Aakulo Aakunai"
1984	Nandi Award	Sangeetha Samrat	"Entha Sogasugaade"
1987	Nandi Award	Viswanatha Nayakudu	"Kavi Jana Samaaja Bhoja"
1989	Nandi Award	Godavari Pongindi	"Eppatla Godavari Pravahistondi"
1989	Tamil Nadu State Award	Varam	"Magane Magane Kannurangu"
2002	Nandi Award	Many movies	Many songs

=== Other Awards ===
- "Kamban Pugazh" award from All Ceylon Kamban Kazhakam, Sri Lanka, 2016
- Best singer of the decade Award from Dr. Subbarami Reddy in 2001
- Lifetime Achievement Award at 7th South Indian International Movie Awards

bharathi daasan award by Tamil Nadu Govt -
KalaimaamaNi award by Tamil Nadu Govt- 1991
Raghupati Venkaiah Award award by Andhra Pradesh Govt. -2004
kamukara award by kerala Govt.
Screen -videocon lifetime achievement award -1996

LifeTime Achievement Award by American Telugu Association - 10 July 2004 at Chicago, USA.
Sangeetha Kala bharathi by Detroit Telugu Association (1979)
Telugu Association of North America – 1995
Awards for Excellence by IAAFA in 1993
Telugu Association of Southern California – 1995
AVM ’50 award – 1997
North American Alumni Association
DTA – 1989
Madhura Gaana Madhuri Award
Award by Telugu Association of Greater Chicago
K.B.Sundaramabal Award
K.V.Rao Jyothi Rao award -1999
Ghantasala Award for 2003 (11/22/2003)
Tamil Nadu MGR Cine Cultural Academy Award -1994
Subbaraami reddy award -1996
Award by Indian Performing Rights Society
Award Presented at Andhra Pradesh Rashtra Yuva Janostav
Bharath kalachar -2001 (gaana kala bharathi)
Kala Saagar Award
Award – Tribute To Shivaji -2003
Jayshree International – Life Time Achievement Award – Kalabushan ( presented by Smt Jayachitra)
Thyagaraja Ganasabha – Only singer to be presented this award by Thyagraja Ganasabha Andhra Pradesh.
Krishna Pushkara Award
Yesudas Award
Kamukara – Lifetime Achievement Award
Gaana Saraswathi by Sangeeth Melody Orchestra
Aasthana Gayini in Shri Kalahasthi Shiva Temple
Madras film fans association award - 26 times
Dr. Rajkumar Award-2020 by Raghavendra Chitravani Foundation

== Discography ==
=== 1950s ===
Year	Film	Song	Composer(s)	Writer(s)	Co-singer(s)
1956	Tenali Raman	"Chandana Charchita Nila Kalebara", "Thennavan Thaai Nattu Singaarame"	Viswanathan–Ramamoorthy	A. Maruthakasi, K. S. Gopalakrishnan	
1958	Uthama Puthiran	"Mullai Malar Mele", "Anbe Amudhey", "Unnazhagai Kanniyargal"	G. Ramanathan	A. Maruthakasi, K. S. Gopalakrishnan	
1958	Sabaash Meena	"Aanaaga Pirandhadhellam", "Kaanaa Inbam Kannidhadheno", "Erungammaa Summaa Erungammaa"	T. G. Lingappa	K. Jamuna Rani, T. A. Mothi, J. P. Chandrababu, T. G. Lingappa	

=== 1960s ===
Year	Film	Song	Composer(s)	Writer(s)	Co-singer(s)
1963	Thobuttuvulu	"Sagenu Jeevitha Naava"	C. Mohan Das	Anisetty Subba Rao	Ghantasala
1963	Thobuttuvulu	"Madhuramaina Reyilo"	C. Mohan Das	Anisetty Subba Rao	Ghantasala
1963	Thobuttuvulu	"Emayya Premayya"	C. Mohan Das	Anisetty Subba Rao	
1967	Kaavalkaaran	"Ninaithen Vanthai", "Mellappo Mellappo", "Kattazhagu Thangamagal"	M. S. Viswanathan	Vaali, Alangudi Somu	
1967	Sakshi	"Atu Yennela Itu Yennela", "Dayaledha Neeku Dayaledha", "Silipoda Sinnoda Cheera Dochukunnoda", "Amma Kadupu Challaga"	K. V. Mahadevan	Aarudra, Daasarathi Krishnamacharyulu	Ghantasala, P B Srinivas
1969	Deiva Magan	"Kaathalikka Katrukollungal", "Koottathileya Yarthan"	M. S. Viswanathan	Kannadasan	

=== 1980s ===
Year	Film	Song	Composer(s)	Writer(s)	Co-singer(s)
1982	Devatha	"Elluvachi Godaramma"	K. Chakravarthy	Veturi	S. P. Balasubrahmanyam
1986	Swati Mutyam	"Laali Laali"	Ilaiyaraaja	C. Narayana Reddy	S. P. Balasubrahmanyam
1988	Swarnakamalam	"Ghallu Ghallu"	Ilaiyaraaja	Sirivennela Seetharama Sastry	S. P. Balasubrahmanyam
1988	Swarnakamalam	"Shiva Poojaku"	Ilaiyaraaja	Sirivennela Seetharama Sastry	S. P. Balasubrahmanyam
1988	Swarnakamalam	"Koluvai Vunnade"	Ilaiyaraaja	Sirivennela Seetharama Sastry	S. P. Balasubrahmanyam

=== 1990s ===
Year	Film	Song	Composer(s)	Writer(s)	Co-singer(s)
1991	Coolie No. 1	"Kalaya Nijama"	Ilaiyaraaja	Sirivennela Seetharama Sastry	Ilaiyaraaja
1991	Dalapathi (D)	"Aada Janmaku"	Ilaiyaraaja	Rajasri	
1993	Padmavyuham (D)	"Kannulaku Choopandam"(Female)	A. R. Rahman	Rajasri	
1995	Kunti Putrudu	"Gummalu Thommidi"(Female)	Ilaiyaraaja		
