= Gaddalakonda Ganesh =

2019 Indian film by Harish Shankar

- Theatrical release poster
- Directed by: Harish Shankar
- Screenplay by: Madhu Srinivas; Mithun Chaitanya
- Dialogues by: Harish Shankar
- Story by: Karthik Subbaraj
- Based on: Jigarthanda (2014)
- Produced by: Ram Achanta; Gopichand Achanta
- Starring: Varun Tej; Atharvaa; Pooja Hegde; Mirnalini Ravi
- Cinematography: Ayananka Bose
- Edited by: Chota K. Prasad
- Music by: Mickey J. Meyer
- Production company: 14 Reels Plus Entertainment
- Release date: 20 September 2019
- Running time: 172 minutes
- Country: India
- Language: Telugu
- Budget: ₹25 crore
- Box office: ₹45 crores

Gaddalakonda Ganesh (Note: Original titled Valmiki, the title was changed after several controversies and a legal dispute.) is a 2019 Indian Telugu-language action comedy film directed by Harish Shankar and produced by Ram Achanta and Gopichand Achanta under the 14 Reels Plus banner. It is a remake of the 2014 Tamil film Jigarthanda which itself was inspired by the 2006 South Korean film A Dirty Carnival. The film stars Varun Tej, Atharvaa, Pooja Hegde, and Mirnalini Ravi. The film marks the Telugu debut of Atharvaa and Mirnalini Ravi. Principal photography began in February 2019 and wrapped in September 2019. The film has music composed by Mickey J. Meyer, cinematography was handled by Ayananka Bose, and editing by Chota K. Prasad.

Gaddalakonda Ganesh was released on 20 September 2018. The film received positive response from both critics and audiences praising cast performances, action, direction, story and screenplay. The film was commercially successful, grossing ₹45 crore at the box office.

== Plot ==
Abhilash a.k.a. Abhi works in a film studio, as an assistant director and aspires to become a film director. He is insulted by one of the directors and resolves to become a good director with a good film in a few days. Another producer likes Abhi's hard work and suggests that he do a gangster film. He decides to make a biopic of a gangster. In search of a gangster, he finds a ruthless gangster named Gaddalakonda Ganesh a.k.a. Gani, who lives in the town of Gaddalakonda. Abhi lands in Gaddalakonda and starts learning about Gani with the help of his friend Chintakayyi. Abhi traps Bujjama, the granddaughter of Gani's chef, and she falls in love with Abhi who reciprocates her feelings.

After some hilarious scenes, Abhi and Chintakayyi befriend Thuppaki, one of Gani's henchmen. Later the duo learns that Thuppaki is helping Prabhakar, one of Gani's rivals, to kill Gani for his position. Gani acknowledges this, and plans to kill Thuppaki and also kidnaps Abhi and his friend. Abhi tells the truth, and Gani feels happy they are making a biopic about him and narrates his story including his criminal activities.

From childhood, Gani started beating people for money. Later he became a fixer for an M.L.A. Gani was also a fan of the actress Sridevi and fell for a girl also named Sridevi a.k.a. Devi, a computer student, but she didn't accept him because of his aimlessness. Later she also reciprocated his feelings after he rescued her from ragging. However, Devi's father refused to accept their relationship due to the caste system. Devi and Gani decide to escape from Gaddalakonda, and Gani refuses to kill someone for the M.L.A. because he wants to leave behind his rowdyism. The M.L.A. informed the police about Gani's whereabouts. The police came to the railway station and beat up Gani. At the same time, Devi's father threatens her to marry the bridegroom whom he had chosen, saying he would otherwise order the police to kill Gani. Devi reluctantly married a police officer who belonged to her caste. Another M.L.A. with a lawyer came to the police station and said that Gani's M.L.A. had informed the police about his whereabouts. Gani then went to his M.L.A. and slit his throat in front of his mother. Gani's mother then filed an FIR against him. But Gani claimed in court that his mother is mute. From that day onwards, she refused to speak with Gani.

Presently, Bujjama learns about Abhi and confronts him. At a party celebrating Abhi's return to Hyderabad, Bujjama asks Gani to act as a protagonist in his biopic. Gani agrees against Abhi's wishes. However, Abhi changes his mind after listening to the theatre operator's words and his passion for directing a film, but he can't do it due to Gani's bad acting. Then Abhi appoints acting coach Muni Manikyam for Gani and his gang. Later the acting coach praises Gani for his acting skills due to his ruthless behaviour and humiliates Gani and his gang while they are training.

The shoot begins. The title of the film is Seetimaar. After understanding the difficulties in directing the film, Bujjama reconciles with Abhi. But things take a turn when Gani also changes his mind and falls for Bujjama. At the audio launch, Gani announces that he has gifted a villa to Abhi and wants to marry Bujjamma.

The film is released and opens to a tremendous response. At the same time, Abhi elopes with Bujjama. Gani learns of this and decides to kill Abhi. Meanwhile, Gani's reputation increases due to his acting skills. The people who feared Gani are now asking for selfies and autographs. The little daughter of Thuppaki, who also once feared Gani, kisses him and praises his acting skills. Gani's mother, who refused to talk to him in the past also speaks to him.

Seeing all this, Gani spares Abhi and Bujjama and gives up his rowdy career. Prabhakar's henchman asks him to include him in Gani's next film, which is being directed by Sukumar. Abhi's paternal uncle takes Gani's criminal evidence (tape recorder and files) and hands it over to the D.C.P., who turns out to be Devi's husband. Devi takes the evidence (tape recorder) and grinds it in a blender. When the D.C.P. asks Devi why she had destroyed the evidence, she replies that it's because the D.C.P. couldn't keep his promise to not incriminate Gani. This indicates that Devi still loves Gani. Later, Devi also praises Gani. Abhi uses Gani's gang to threaten stars like Nithin to act in his film and later marries Bujjama, while Gani remains single.

== Cast ==
- Varun Tej as Gaddalakonda Ganesh "Gani"
- Atharvaa as Abhilash "Abhi"
- Pooja Hegde as Sridevi "Devi"
- Mirnalini Ravi as Bujjamma
- Supriya Pathak as Gaddalakonda Ganesh's mother
- Brahmaji as Muni Manikyam, an acting coach
- Pradeep as Abhi's father
- Saraswathi as Abhi's mother
- Devi Prasad as Madhav Rao, Abhi's uncle
- Subbaraju as Penchalayya, Prabhakar's henchman and Buchi Naidu's follower
- Annapoorna as Gani's chef
- Tanikella Bharani as Chalam, the theatre operator
- Satya as Konda Mallikarjuna Rao aka Kondamalli (Chintakkayi), Abhilash's friend
- Raja Ravindra as Nallamandu Babji
- Raghu Babu as Producer
- Prabhas Sreenu as Balijayya
- Shatru as Kasi
- Appaji Ambarisha Darbha as Sridevi's father
- Fish Venkat as Khanberi Kanthayya
- Gautam Raju as Kondamalli's uncle
- Ananth Babu as a priest
- Gundu Sudarshan as the typewriting instructor
- Chammak Chandra as an auto driver
- Gururaj Manepalli as Director
- Kadambari Kiran
- Naga Mahesh as Buchi Naidu
- Sukku Reddy as Prabhakar
- Brahmanandam as himself (cameo appearance)
- Rao Ramesh as a writer (cameo appearance)
- Nithiin as himself (guest appearance)
- Sukumar as himself (guest appearance)
- Dimple Hayathi as an item number in the song "Jarra Jarra"

== Production ==
=== Development ===
"When I was working on my next film’s script, Karthik Subburaj's Petta released and it was then I watched his Jigarthanda again. Jigarthanda was my favourite film and I believe there was some magic in this story and thought it would work well in Telugu too. I felt Varun Tej will bring a fresh perspective for the negative role played by Bobby Simha in the original and that's how Valmiki began".

— Harish Shankar, on the origin of the film.

In early November 2018, it was reported that Harish Shankar was to remake the critically acclaimed Tamil-language film Jigarthanda (2014). That December, Varun Tej was reported to play lead role in the film. In early January 2019, Varun revealed that he was approached for the role, but the final call was still on-going. Tej revealed that many people had cautioned him and asked him not to sign the film, since his role has negative shades. He took the script to Chiranjeevi, who didn't ask him if he was going to play the hero or villain and told him that the script was good and that he should go ahead and sign the project. So he signed the film immediately.

Harish said "After DJ, I wanted to go ahead with an urban love story on the lines of Fidaa and Tholi Prema with Varun Tej and pitched the script of Dagudu Muthalu. But he was looking to break his lover boy image and is keen to do a mass entertainer in my signature style". After eight hour long discussion both decided to remake Jigarthanda.

The project was produced by Ram Achanta and Gopichand Achanta under their banner 14 Reels Plus Entertainment. The company made a public announcement on 25 January 2018, confirming the project, and the film's official title Valmiki was revealed on 27 January 2018.

=== Pre-production ===
Karthik Subbaraj gave the original story and Harish Shankar made some changes to original story, later Mithun Chaitanya and Madhu Srinivas scripted the film. Dialogues were written by Harish himself.

I didn’t want to change the script written by Karthik (Subbaraj) as I thought it was brilliant. However, I have adapted the story to suit our local sensibilities keeping Varun’s image in mind. I have also created a substantial role for Pooja Hegde and her presence will take the film to a different level. If you recall, Jigarthanda was released in Telugu with the same name, but not many people watched it. So, we took a calculative step, acquired the remake rights and made Valmiki.

— Harish Shankar

Prior to the start of film production, both Harish and Tej worked with each other six months for making changes from the original film and characters. "One of the major changes that we have done to this character, originally essayed by Bobby Simha, was give him a backstory to justify why he had become like that. In the original version, Bobby Simha didn’t have a baggage to play that role and he was terrific. But Harish opined that since I had been playing lead roles in the past few years, giving a strong backstory will make it easier for the audience to accept me playing a bad guy. That’s how Pooja Hegde came onboard and she has an interesting role to play in the second half of the story. All the details about my look, the dialect I’m going to use, and body language emerged from the long conversations I have had with Harish during this phase", Tej added.

Devi Sri Prasad was initially roped in to compose the score for the film. But later Mickey J Meyer signed to compose music for the film. Harish further retained most of his regular technicians including cinematographer Ayananka Bose, editor Chota K. Prasad, stunt choreography duo Ram Lakshman, dance choreographer Sekhar and art director Avinash Kolla. The film's launch event with a puja ceremony was held on 27 January 2019 at Ramanaidu Studios, which saw the attendance of noted personalities from the Telugu film industry. Sukumar, V. V. Vinayak, Dil Raju, Niharika Konidela graced the event as chief guests, along with film's cast and crew.

=== Casting ===
Varun Tej portrays the title character Gaddalakonda Ganesh, a gangster, and sported a bearded look for his role in the film. About his role Tej said "I don't see a character as positive or negative. Any role that excites me and makes feel I’m doing something different, I do it. This character got me excited from the minute I heard the narration." Tej learned the Telangana dialect for his role and was also informed by Pawan Kalyan.

In February 2019, Pooja Hegde was confirmed to play the female lead, marking her second collaboration with both Tej and Shankar after Mukunda (2014) and DJ (2017) respectively. "Pooja's character, the 'innocent but feisty' Sridevi, wasn't part of the original. I got her in because I wanted to see how Ganesh would react to having a girl in his life. People will love her in the Velluvachi Godaramma remix that we shot at Yanam [Puducherry]", Shankar on Hegde's character. Hegde felt that she was "excited to play a super special character in this film".

Atharvaa was reported to be playing an aspiring film maker in the film. Mirnalini Ravi was reported to play a supporting role in the film and was paired opposite Atharvaa. The film marked the Telugu film debut of both Atharvaa and Mirnalini.

Brahmanandam and Rao Ramesh joined the casts to play cameo roles, and Sukumar and Nithiin joined the cast for guest appearance.

=== Filming ===
Principal photography the film began from February 2019. Atharvaa joined the shooting in March 2019. In late-March, it was reported that Varun Tej would join the sets in mid-April 2019. Later, he joined the sets on 16 April 2019. In May, footage of Tej was leaked and went viral. Tej met with an accident while travelling from Hyderabad to Kurnool to take part in shooting of the film. In mid-June 2018, Harish Shankar tweeted that filming was happening at Yaganti temple.

In July 2019, while shooting in Anantapur district of Andhra Pradesh, the Boya community halted the film's shoot (see #Controversies). Later the production moved to Chevella, Hyderabad. In late-July 2019, Pooja Hegde joined the sets. In early-August, Hollywood cinematographer Robert Richardson visited the film's set. A song featuring Pooja Hegde and Tej was shot on the banks of Godavari River at Rajahmundry in late-August. Principal photography wrapped by 4 September 2019.

=== Post-production ===
Post-production of the film began simultaneously with the wrapping-up and continuation of film production. Dubbing works of the film began in August 2019. Varun Tej had put in extra efforts to dub for the pre-interval sequence. "I took an entire day to dub for it. Like the original, Valmiki too has a run-time of around three hours", he added.

VFX work of the film was done by EFX. The trailer cut was done in late-August by A. Ravi and Aswin Siyadri and was over by early-September 2019. On 19 September 2019, the film received a U/A certificate from the Censor Board, with a finalised runtime of 173 minutes.

== Marketing ==
In June 2019, 14 Reels Plus released a pre-teaser on social media platforms. On 15 August 2019 the team released the official teaser and started promoting the film by releasing singles from the album. The official trailer of the film was unveiled by 14 Reels Plus on 9 September 2019 and trailer launch event was held on the same day in Hyderabad.

As part of film's promotion, in collaboration with Hyderabad Metro, the production's marketing team placed advertisements on Hyderabad Metro trains. On 15 September 2018, a grand pre-release event for the film took place in Hyderabad at Shilpakala Vedika, with Venkatesh as the chief guest.

== Music ==
The soundtrack is composed by Mickey J. Meyer. The song "Elluvochi Godaramma" is a remix of the song "Elluvachi Godaramma" from the 1982 film Devatha. The film marks Meyer's second collaboration with Harish after Subramanyam for Sale (2015). The film featured four tracks with lyrics written by Bhaskarabhatla, Vanamali, Chandrabose and Veturi Sundararama Murthy. The soundtrack album was released by Sony Music India on 5 September 2019. The initial release contained only three tracks; the fourth one was excluded as it was released under the record label Saregama. The release coincided with a promotional event held in Hyderabad to promote film's fourth single "Elluvochi Godaramma".

== Controversies ==
Valmiki, the legendary ancient Indian poet of the Ramayana, is especially revered by the Boyas and many people from that community protested to change the name of the film as the lead actor is in a negative role. The release of the film was stalled in Anantapur and Kurnool districts of Andhra Pradesh by their respective district collectors due to the protests. In January 2019, Boya Hakkula Porata Samithi filed a petition in the Telangana High Court and Andhra Pradesh Valmiki Boya Sangam (APVBS) in the AP High Court with PIL No:139/2019 by State General Secretary Kranthi Naidu Boya; both contending that the title hurt sentiments as the name of a great saint as Valmiki was being used for a character that donning the role of a villain.

Poster released indicating the change of the film's title

Due to many controversies over the film's title and release stalling in some areas, the title was changed to Gaddalakonda Ganesh only 6 hours prior to the release of the film.

== Release ==
=== Theatrical ===
The film was initially scheduled to be released on 13 September 2019, however it was postponed to 20 September due to production delays.

=== Home media ===
The film's digital rights were acquired by Disney+ Hotstar and it started streaming on Hotstar VIP from 4 November 2019. The original Telugu-language version of the film premiered on television on 12 January 2020 on Star Maa, and registered a television rating point of 12.75 according to Broadcast Audience Research Council, becoming the Varun Tej's most viewed film on television. The Hindi dubbed version premiered on Dhinchaak TV channel on 6 March 2022.

Despite being a remake of the Tamil film Jigarthanda, it was also dubbed in Tamil as Kazhugumalai Ganesan in 2021. The film was also dubbed and released in Malayalam as Gajarakota Ganesha in 2022.

== Reception ==
=== Critical response ===
Gaddalakonda Ganesh received a positive response, with both critics and audiences praising cast performances, action, direction, story and screenplay.

Neeshita Nyayapati writing for The Times of India gave 3.5/5 rating praising Varun Tej's performance as a gangster. A critic of The Hans India rated the film 3 out of 5 stars calling it "worth watching" and wrote "though this is a remake film, the director has succeeded in making the necessary changes and made the film really interesting. The movie starts off on an interesting note and the entire first half is filled with the some action sequences and the story of the gangster."

Rating the film with 3 out of 5 stars, Jeevi of Idlebrain.com wrote "Harish Shankar takes the Tamil cult classic Jigarthanda and gives a mass tweak to it by changing the PoV from hero to villain. Varun Tej adds a new weapon to his armoury with this film. Plus points of the film are Varun Tej and mass elements."

Banda Kalyan writing for Sakshi gave 3/5, pointing out that the only drawback of the film is the forced comedy and how people are simply laughing at the screen while watching a film about a gangster. A 123 Telugu critic rated it 3 out of 5 stars and wrote "On the whole, Gaddalakonda Ganesh is a passable mass drama which has a few good moments. Varun Tej leads from the front with his solid performance and rocking makeover. The fun generated works in places and keeps the audience engaged."

Sankeertana Varma from Film Companion noted "The entertaining film is packed with inside jokes, but a laugh is inevitably followed by a wince". Sangeetha Devi writing for The Hindu suggested this adaptation raises a toast to the cinema, more importantly showcases the power of the director. Hemanth Kumar CR of Firstpost wrote "Varun Tej’s makeover as a fierce gangster is Gaddhalakonda Ganesh’s biggest USP and Harish Shankar taps into the actor’s energy to add zing into this film"

=== Box office ===
Gaddalakonda Ganesh had higher occupancy on its opening day. The film netted ₹16 crore in its opening weekend. The film grossed ₹45 crore in its theatrical run with over ₹25 crore as distribution share, becoming a commercial successful.

== Accolades ==
Award (Note: Awards, festivals and organizations are in alphabetical order.)	Date of ceremony (Note: Date is linked to the article about the awards held that year, wherever possible.)	Category	Recipient(s)	Result	Ref.
South Indian International Movie Awards	18 September 2021	Best Actor	Varun Tej	Nominated	
South Indian International Movie Awards	18 September 2021	Best Supporting Actor – Telugu	Atharvaa	Nominated	
South Indian International Movie Awards	18 September 2021	Best Supporting Actress – Telugu	Mirnalini Ravi	Nominated	
South Indian International Movie Awards	18 September 2021	Best Music Director – Telugu	Mickey J. Meyer	Nominated	
Santosham Film Awards	14 November 2021	Best Director	Harish Shankar	Won	
Santosham Film Awards	14 November 2021	Best Male Playback Singer	S. P. Balasubrahmanyam	Won	
