= Varun Tej =

Indian actor (born 1990)

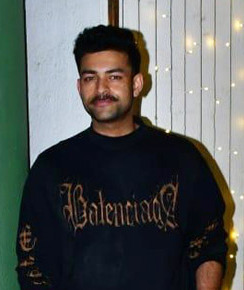
- Varun Tej in 2024
- Born: Konidela Sai Varun Tej; 19 January 1990 (age 36)
- Education: St. Mary's College, Hyderabad
- Occupation: Actor
- Years active: 2000–present
- Spouse: Lavanya Tripathi (m. 2023)
- Children: 1
- Father: Nagendra Babu
- Family: See Konidela–Allu family

Konidela Sai Varun Tej (born 19 January 1990) is an Indian actor who works in Telugu cinema. He made his acting debut in 2014 with Mukunda. He received praise for featuring in Krish's critically acclaimed war film Kanche (2015). He established himself as a leading actor with the romantic drama Fidaa (2017), a major critical and commercial success. He has since starred in films including Tholi Prema (2018), Gaddalakonda Ganesh (2019), F2 (2019) and F3 (2022). He is married to his co-actress Lavanya Tripathi.

== Early life and family ==
Tej is the son of Telugu actor and producer Nagendra Babu. He is a nephew of actors Chiranjeevi and Pawan Kalyan. His younger sister Niharika is an actress and producer. Actors Ram Charan, Allu Arjun, Allu Sirish, Sai Tej and Panja Vaisshnav Tej are his cousins. He was educated at Bharatiya Vidya Bhavan, Jubilee Hills, Hyderabad, and at St. Mary's College, Hyderabad.

== Career ==
Tej debuted as a child artist in his father Nagendra Babu's film Hands Up when he was ten years old. He made his adult debut with Mukunda, starring opposite Pooja Hegde. The film earned positive reviews. His second venture was the 2015 war film Kanche, starring opposite Pragya Jaiswal and received positive reviews from critics. Tej's performance as Dhupati Haribabu was praised with The Times of India praising his "capability to shift gears from intense to sobriety". His second release that year Loafer, was a box office failure, along with his 2017 outing Mister.

The later half of 2017 saw the release of Fidaa, where he played an NRI falling in love with a village belle. The film was commercially successful grossing over ₹90 crore at the box office. His 2018 release Tholi Prema was also a box office success and Tej's performance as an impulsive young man was widely appreciated. His next film that year was space thriller Antariksham 9000 KMPH, directed by Sankalp Reddy.

In 2019, Tej's first release was F2: Fun and Frustration, co-starring Venkatesh, Tamannaah and Mehreen Pirzada, which became a huge blockbuster. After F2, he dubbed in Telugu for Aladdin's role in the film Aladdin. He later starred in Gaddalakonda Ganesh, a remake of the Tamil film Jigarthanda, directed by Harish Shankar which was a success at the box office.

As of January 2020, Tej has two films under production, Ghani, and F2's sequel F3. Tej next played the role of a boxer, in Ghani (2022) directed by Kiran Korrapati. Following the film's release, Tej acknowledged the reviews and apologised, accepting the film's failure at the box office through a note on social media.

== Personal life ==
Tej met actress Lavanya Tripathi on the sets of their film Mister (2017) and eventually started dating her. They went on to work together in Antariksham 9000 KMPH in 2018. The couple got engaged on 8 June 2023 in Hyderabad. They got married on 1 November 2023 in Tuscany, Italy in a traditional ceremony. On 9 September 2025, Tripathi gave birth to their son. Varun Tej and Lavanya Tripathi announced the name of their firstborn son as Vaayuv Tej Konidela on the occasion of Vijayadashami on 2 October 2025.

== Media image ==
Tej stood at the 27th place on Forbes India's most influential stars on Instagram in South cinema for the year 2021. In the Hyderabad Times Most Desirable Men list, Tej was placed 7th in 2019 and 17th in 2020. In Rediff.com's "Top Telugu Actors" list, Tej was placed 5th in 2012.

== Filmography ==
Key
†	Denotes films that have not yet been released

Year	Title	Role	Notes	Ref.
2000	Hands Up	Child who wants teddy bear	Child actor	
2014	Mukunda	Mukunda	Debut as lead role	
2015	Kanche	Dhupati Hari Babu		
2015	Loafer	Raja Murali		
2017	Mister	Pichchayya Naidu "Chai"		
2017	Fidaa	Varun		
2018	Tholi Prema	Aditya Sekhar		
2018	Antariksham 9000 KMPH	Dev		
2019	F2: Fun and Frustration	Varun Yadav		
2019	Aladdin	Aladdin (voice)	Telugu dubbed version	
2019	Gaddalakonda Ganesh	Gaddalakonda Ganesh "Gani"		
2022	Ghani	Ghani		
2022	F3	Varun Yadav		
2023	Gandeevadhari Arjuna	Arjun Varma		
2024	Operation Valentine	Arjun Dev alias "Rudra"	Simultaneously shot in Hindi	
2024	Matka	"Matka" Vasu		
2026	Korean Kanakaraju	Kanakaraju "Kanaka"		
2027	Bhari †	Bhari	Filming	

=== Television ===
Year	Shows	Role	Network	Notes
2018	Nanna Koochi	Narrator	ZEE5	
2019	Bigg Boss 3	Himself	Star Maa	Guest appearance

== Awards and nominations ==
Year	Award	Category	Film	Result	Ref.
2015	South Indian International Movie Awards	Best Actor – Telugu	Kanche	Nominated	
2017	Zee Telugu Golden Awards	Entertainer Of The Year (Male)	Fidaa	Nominated	
2018	Zee Cine Awards Telugu	Best Film Actor	Tholi Prema	Nominated	
2019	South Indian International Movie Awards	Best Actor – Telugu	Gaddalakonda Ganesh	Nominated	
