= List of Dharma Productions films =

Many changes to plot summaries, difficult to verify.

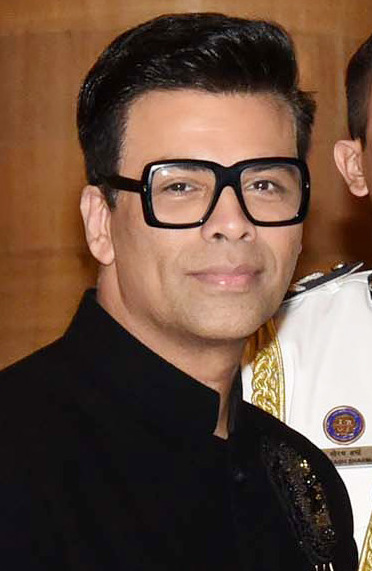
Karan Johar, the son of founder Yash Johar, has directed seven films for Dharma Productions, as of 2023

Dharma Productions is an Indian production company established by Yash Johar in 1976. As of 2024, the company has produced 63 Hindi films, including three that have yet to be released. A large number of the films were co-produced with companies such as Red Chillies Entertainment, Star Studios, Zee Studios and Viacom18 Studios. In addition, Dharma Productions has presented ten other-Indian language films from other companies. The most frequent collaborations of the company have been with the actors Alia Bhatt, Shah Rukh Khan, Sidharth Malhotra, Kareena Kapoor Khan, Amitabh Bachchan, Ranbir Kapoor, Kajol, Varun Dhawan and Sanjay Dutt.

Dharma Productions' first release came in 1980 with the Raj Khosla–directed Dostana, starring Amitabh Bachchan, Shatrughan Sinha and Zeenat Aman, which was a commercial success. However, their subsequent releases, Duniya (1984) and Muqaddar Ka Faisla (1987) performed poorly at the box office. Their first release of the 1990s, the Bachchan-starring thriller Agneepath (1990) garnered critical acclaim but was a commercial failure. The company's next releases were the thriller Gumrah (1993) and the comedy Duplicate (1998), both directed by Mahesh Bhatt. In 1998, Yash Johar's son, Karan Johar made his directorial debut with the romantic drama Kuch Kuch Hota Hai, starring Shah Rukh Khan, Kajol, Rani Mukerji and Salman Khan. The film was the highest-grossing Bollywood film of 1998, and established Dharma Productions as a leading production company in India. Their subsequent releases, the ensemble family drama Kabhi Khushi Kabhie Gham (2001), and the romantic comedy-drama Kal Ho Naa Ho (2003) and the musical romantic drama Kabhi Alvida Naa Kehna (2006), all starring Shah Rukh Khan, were top-grossing Hindi films in domestic and overseas markets.

From 2008 onwards, in addition to directorial ventures from Karan Johar, the company introduced several new directors, including Ayan Mukerji, Punit Malhotra, Karan Malhotra, and Shakun Batra. The romantic comedy Dostana (2008) was the first mainstream Hindi film to take on a homosexual storyline. In 2012, Karan Johar directed the teen romance Student of the Year, which marked the debut of Malhotra, Dhawan, and Bhatt. The following year, the company co-produced the critically acclaimed drama The Lunchbox, which was nominated for the BAFTA Award for Best Film Not in the English Language.

Dharma Productions' greatest successes in the next decades came with the social drama My Name Is Khan (2010); the vigilante and Crime Action Drama film, the 2012 Agneepath a, remake of the 1990 cult classic movie of the same name; and the romantic dramas Yeh Jawaani Hai Deewani (2013), 2 States (2014), Ae Dil Hai Mushkil (2016), and Badrinath Ki Dulhania (2017); the family drama Kapoor & Sons (2016); the spy film Raazi (2018); the action films Simmba (2018) and Sooryavanshi (2021); the comedy Good Newwz (2019); the war film Shershaah (2021); the fantasy film Brahmāstra: Part One – Shiva (2022); and the romantic comedy film Rocky Aur Rani Kii Prem Kahaani (2023).

== Films produced ==
Key
| † | Denotes films that have not yet been released |

| Title | Year | Director | Producer(s) | Cast | Synopsis | Ref. |
|---|---|---|---|---|---|---|
| Dostana | 1980 | Raj Khosla | Yash Johar | Amitabh Bachchan, Shatrughan Sinha, Zeenat Aman | A cop and a lawyer, bound by friendship, are torn apart when they fall for the same woman. | |
| Duniya | 1984 | Ramesh Talwar | Yash Johar | Dilip Kumar, Rishi Kapoor, Amrita Singh, Saira Banu | Wrongfully imprisoned by criminals, an honest man seeks justice with the aid of a former spy originally tasked with betraying him. | |
| Muqaddar Ka Faisla | 1987 | Prakash Mehra | Yash Johar | Raaj Kumar, Raakhee, Raj Babbar, Meenakshi Seshadri, Tina Munim | Wrongly imprisoned for rape, a Hindu priest returns to find his family and avenge his dishonor. | |
| Agneepath | 1990 | Mukul S. Anand | Yash Johar | Amitabh Bachchan, Mithun Chakraborty, Danny Denzongpa, Madhavi | A man sets out to avenge his father's death after he is framed and killed by a ruthless villain. | |
| Gumrah | 1993 | Mahesh Bhatt | Yash Johar | Sridevi, Sanjay Dutt, Rahul Roy | Framed for drug trafficking, an aspiring singer escapes prison to take revenge on those who betrayed her. | |
| Duplicate | 1998 | Mahesh Bhatt | Yash Johar | Shah Rukh Khan, Juhi Chawla, Sonali Bendre | Chaos ensues when an aspiring chef and his gangster lookalike accidentally swap lives. | |
| Kuch Kuch Hota Hai | 1998 | Karan Johar | Yash Johar | Shah Rukh Khan, Kajol, Rani Mukerji, Salman Khan | An eight-year-old girl sets out to fulfill her late mother's wish by reuniting her father with his college friend who once secretly loved him. | |
| Kabhi Khushi Kabhie Gham... | 2001 | Karan Johar | Yash Johar | Amitabh Bachchan, Jaya Bhaduri Bachchan, Shah Rukh Khan, Kajol, Hrithik Roshan, Kareena Kapoor | A wealthy industrialist disowns his adopted son for marrying a poor girl, but years later, his younger son sets out to reunite the family. | |
| Kal Ho Naa Ho | 2003 | Nikhil Advani | Yash Johar | Shah Rukh Khan, Saif Ali Khan, Preity Zinta, Jaya Bhaduri Bachchan | A terminally ill man falls for a troubled young woman but chooses to unite her with her best friend instead. | |
| Kaal (Note: The film was co-produced with Red Chillies Entertainment.) | 2005 | Soham Shah | Karan Johar, Shah Rukh Khan | Ajay Devgn, John Abraham, Vivek Oberoi, Esha Deol, Lara Dutta | When tourists face a deadly force in a national park, they turn to a mysterious local for help. | |
| Kabhi Alvida Naa Kehna | 2006 | Karan Johar | Hiroo Johar | Shah Rukh Khan, Rani Mukerji, Abhishek Bachchan, Preity Zinta, Amitabh Bachchan, Kiron Kher | An extra-marital affair between a bitter football coach and an unhappy schoolteacher destroys their respective marriages. | |
| Dostana | 2008 | Tarun Mansukhani | Karan Johar, Hiroo Johar | Abhishek Bachchan, John Abraham, Priyanka Chopra, Bobby Deol | Two men pretend to be gay to share an apartment with a woman—only to fall for her themselves. | |
| Wake Up Sid! (Note: The film was co-produced with UTV Motion Pictures.) | 2009 | Ayan Mukerji | Karan Johar, Hiroo Johar | Ranbir Kapoor, Konkona Sen Sharma | A lazy young man's life transforms after he moves in with an ambitious writer. | |
| Kurbaan | 2009 | Rensil D'Silva | Karan Johar, Hiroo Johar | Saif Ali Khan, Kareena Kapoor, Vivek Oberoi | A woman discovers her husband is a terrorist who married her to enter the U.S.—and fights to stop his deadly mission. | |
| My Name Is Khan (Note: The film was co-produced with Fox Searchlight Pictures, Fox Star Studios, and Red Chillies Entertainment.) | 2010 | Karan Johar | Hiroo Johar, Gauri Khan | Shah Rukh Khan, Kajol | In Post-9/11 America, a Muslim man with Asperger's journeys across the country to meet the President, fulfilling a promise to his wife. | |
| I Hate Luv Storys | 2010 | Punit Malhotra | Karan Johar, Hiroo Johar, Ronnie Screwvala | Imran Khan, Sonam Kapoor, Sammir Dattani | An engaged woman develops a one-sided attraction towards a commitment-phobic co-worker. | |
| We Are Family (Note: The film was co-produced with Sony Pictures and UTV Motion Pictures.) | 2010 | Siddharth P. Malhotra | Karan Johar, Hiroo Johar | Kajol, Kareena Kapoor, Arjun Rampal | A woman cares for her stepchildren when her husband's ex-wife is diagnosed with cancer. | |
| Agneepath | 2012 | Karan Malhotra | Karan Johar, Hiroo Johar | Hrithik Roshan, Rishi Kapoor, Sanjay Dutt, Priyanka Chopra | A man sets out to avenge his father's murder after being framed by a ruthless gangster. | |
| Ek Main Aur Ekk Tu | 2012 | Shakun Batra | Karan Johar, Hiroo Johar, Ronnie Screwvala | Imran Khan, Kareena Kapoor | An under-confident man accidentally marries a free-spirited woman who helps him find himself before they part ways. | |
| Student of the Year | 2012 | Karan Johar | Hiroo Johar, Gauri Khan | Sidharth Malhotra, Varun Dhawan, Alia Bhatt, Rishi Kapoor | The bond between three friends is tested as they compete for glory in their school's annual championship. | |
| Gippi | 2013 | Sonam Nair | Karan Johar, Hiroo Johar | Riya Vij, Divya Dutta, Taaha Shah | An insecure teenage girl from a broken home challenges a popular rival in the school elections, learning to embrace herself. | |
| Yeh Jawaani Hai Deewani | 2013 | Ayan Mukerji | Karan Johar, Hiroo Johar | Ranbir Kapoor, Deepika Padukone | A free-spirited man and a reserved woman fall in love while attending a mutual friend's wedding. | |
| Gori Tere Pyaar Mein | 2013 | Punit Malhotra | Karan Johar, Hiroo Johar | Imran Khan, Kareena Kapoor | To woo his lady love, a social worker, a man must travel to a remote village in India where she is working on a project. | |
| Hasee Toh Phasee (Note: The film was co-produced with Phantom Films.) | 2014 | Vinil Mathew | Karan Johar, Vikas Bahl, Vikramaditya Motwane, Anurag Kashyap | Sidharth Malhotra, Parineeti Chopra, Adah Sharma | A struggling businessman is sympathetic to his fiancé's sister, a drug abusing scientist, and helps her mend fences with her family. | |
| 2 States (Note: The film was co-produced with UTV Motion Pictures and Nadiadwala Grandson Entertainment.) | 2014 | Abhishek Varman | Karan Johar, Sajid Nadiadwala | Arjun Kapoor, Alia Bhatt | Two recently graduated students, belonging to different parts of India, face trouble in convincing their parents to approve of their relationship. | |
| Humpty Sharma Ki Dulhania | 2014 | Shashank Khaitan | Karan Johar, Hiroo Johar | Varun Dhawan, Alia Bhatt, Sidharth Shukla | A girl's marriage is arranged by her father to a successful NRI doctor, but she engages in an affair with another man. | |
| Ungli | 2014 | Rensil D'Silva | Karan Johar, Hiroo Johar | Emraan Hashmi, Sanjay Dutt, Randeep Hooda, Kangana Ranaut | Four friends turn vigilantes to fight political corruption, while a determined police officer attempts to track them down. | |
| Brothers (Note: The film was co-produced with Lionsgate and Endemol India.) | 2015 | Karan Malhotra | Karan Johar; Hiroo Johar | Akshay Kumar, Sidharth Malhotra, Jackie Shroff, Jacqueline Fernandez | The younger son of an alcoholic former boxer competes in a MMA tournament against his older brother. | |
| Shaandaar | 2015 | Vikas Bahl | Karan Johar, Vikas Bahl, Vikramaditya Motwane, Anurag Kashyap | Shahid Kapoor, Alia Bhatt, Pankaj Kapur | Two insomniacs fall in love during a destination wedding. | |
| Kapoor & Sons (Note: The film was co-produced with Fox Star Studios.) | 2016 | Shakun Batra | Karan Johar, Hiroo Johar, Apoorva Mehta | Rishi Kapoor, Sidharth Malhotra, Fawad Khan, Alia Bhatt | Two brothers return home to their dysfunctional family when their grandfather suffers from a cardiac arrest. | |
| Baar Baar Dekho (Note: The film was co-produced with Excel Entertainment and Eros International.) | 2016 | Nitya Mehra | Karan Johar, Farhan Akhtar, Ritesh Sidhwani | Sidharth Malhotra, Katrina Kaif | A mathematician develops cold feet before his marriage and finds himself valuing family life after travelling forward in time. | |
| Ae Dil Hai Mushkil | 2016 | Karan Johar | Karan Johar, Hiroo Johar | Ranbir Kapoor, Aishwarya Rai Bachchan, Anushka Sharma | An aspiring musician develops a one-sided attraction towards a woman, but she is intent on keeping the relationship platonic. | |
| Dear Zindagi (Note: The film was co-produced with Red Chillies Entertainment and Hope Productions.) | 2016 | Gauri Shinde | Karan Johar; Gauri Khan, Gauri Shinde | Alia Bhatt, Shah Rukh Khan | A therapist helps a troubled cinematographer resolve conflicts with her parents. | |
| Ok Jaanu (Note: The film was co-produced with Madras Talkies and Fox Star Studios.) | 2017 | Shaad Ali | Karan Johar; Mani Ratnam | Aditya Roy Kapur, Shraddha Kapoor | A couple in a live-in relationship struggle to balance their careers and their commitment to each other. | |
| Badrinath Ki Dulhania | 2017 | Shashank Khaitan | Karan Johar, Hiroo Johar, Apoorva Mehta | Varun Dhawan, Alia Bhatt | An independent woman challenges patriarchal norms imposed by her domineering fiancé. | |
| Ittefaq (Note: The film was co-produced with Red Chillies Entertainment and BR Films.) | 2017 | Abhay Chopra | Karan Johar, Hiroo Johar, Gauri Khan, Renu Chopra | Sidharth Malhotra, Akshaye Khanna, Sonakshi Sinha | A writer and a housewife are suspected of murdering each other's spouses. | |
| Raazi (Note: The film was co-produced with Junglee Pictures.) | 2018 | Meghna Gulzar | Karan Johar, Hiroo Johar, Vineet Jain, Apoorva Mehta | Alia Bhatt, Vicky Kaushal | An Indian woman is married off to spy on a Pakistani policeman prior to the Indo-Pakistani War of 1971. | |
| Dhadak (Note: The film was co-produced with Zee Studios.) | 2018 | Shashank Khaitan | Karan Johar, Hiroo Johar, Apoorva Mehta | Ishaan Khatter, Janhvi Kapoor | Two young lovers from different classes struggle to stay together amid rising political conflict. | |
| Simmba (Note: The film was co-produced with Reliance Entertainment and Rohit Shetty Productions.) | 2018 | Rohit Shetty | Karan Johar, Hiroo Johar, Rohit Shetty, Apoorva Mehta | Ranveer Singh, Sonu Sood, Sara Ali Khan | A corrupt police officer undergoes a change of heart after someone close to him is raped. | |
| Kesari (Note: The film was co-produced with Cape of Good Films.) | 2019 | Anurag Singh | Karan Johar, Hiroo Johar, Apoorva Mehta, Aruna Bhatia, Sunir Khetarpal | Akshay Kumar, Parineeti Chopra | In 1897, 21 Sikh soldiers fight the Pashtuns in the Battle of Saragarhi. | |
| Kalank (Note: The film was co-produced with Fox Star Studios and Nadiadwala Grandson Entertainment.) | 2019 | Abhishek Varman | Karan Johar, Sajid Nadiadwala | Madhuri Dixit, Sonakshi Sinha, Alia Bhatt, Varun Dhawan, Aditya Roy Kapur, Sanjay Dutt | A married Hindu woman and a Muslim blacksmith with a dark past fall in love prior to the partition of India. | |
| Student of the Year 2 | 2019 | Punit Malhotra | Karan Johar, Hiroo Johar, Apoorva Mehta | Tiger Shroff, Tara Sutaria, Ananya Panday | A college student clashes with a wealthy rival for a major sports title and a prestigious campus honor. | |
| Drive (Note: The film was released digitally on Netflix.) | 2019 | Tarun Mansukhani | Karan Johar; Hiroo Johar | Sushant Singh Rajput, Jacqueline Fernandez | An undercover agent infiltrates a street racing gang to track down a notorious gold thief pursued by the police. | |
| Good Newwz (Note: The film was co-produced with Zee Studios and Cape of Good Films.) | 2019 | Raj Mehta | Karan Johar, Aruna Bhatia, Hiroo Yash Johar, Apoorva Mehta, Shashank Khaitan | Akshay Kumar, Kareena Kapoor, Diljit Dosanjh, Kiara Advani | Two couples with the same surname learn that their IVF sperm samples were accidentally swapped. | |
| Bhoot – Part One: The Haunted Ship | 2020 | Bhanu Pratap Singh | Karan Johar, Hiroo Johar, Apoorva Mehta, Shashank Khaitan | Vicky Kaushal, Bhumi Pednekar | A grieving private investigator sets out to uncover the truth behind a mysteriously abandoned ship. | |
| Gunjan Saxena: The Kargil Girl | 2020 | Sharan Sharma | Karan Johar, Hiroo Johar, Apoorva Mehta, Zee Studios | Janhvi Kapoor, Pankaj Tripathi, Angad Bedi, Manav Vij, Vineet Kumar Singh | The true story of a young woman who overcomes obstacles to become a pioneering Indian Air Force pilot. | |
| Shershaah (Note: The film was co-produced with Kaash Entertainment) (Note: The film was released digitally on Amazon Prime Video.) | 2021 | Vishnuvardhan | Karan Johar, Hiroo Johar, Apoorva Mehta, Shabbir Boxwala, Ajay Shah, Himanshu Gandhi | Sidharth Malhotra, Kiara Advani | The story of Captain Vikram Batra, a Param Vir Chakra awardee, whose bravery played a key role in India's victory during the 1999 Kargil War. | |
| Sooryavanshi (Note: The film was co-produced with Reliance Entertainment, Rohit Shetty Picturez and Cape of Good Films.) | 2021 | Rohit Shetty | Karan Johar, Rohit Shetty, Aruna Bhatia | Akshay Kumar, Katrina Kaif | A police officer sets out to dismantle a terrorist organization tied to his past. | |
| Gehraiyaan (Note: The film was co-produced with Viacom18 Studios and Jouska Films) | 2022 | Shakun Batra | Karan Johar, Hiroo Johar, Apoorva Mehta, Shakun Batra | Deepika Padukone, Siddhant Chaturvedi, Ananya Panday, Dhairya Karwa | A woman's life unravels as she enters a complex relationship that brings buried secrets and emotional turmoil to the surface. | |
| Jugjugg Jeeyo (Note: The film was co-produced with Viacom18 Studios.) | 2022 | Raj Mehta | Karan Johar, Hiroo Johar, Apoorva Mehta | Varun Dhawan, Anil Kapoor, Kiara Advani, Neetu Kapoor | A family's journey through values, unspoken desires, and unexpected reconciliations. | |
| Liger (Note: The film was co-produced with Puri Connects) | 2022 | Puri Jagannadh | Karan Johar, Hiroo Johar, Apoorva Mehta, Puri Jagannadh, Charmme Kaur | Vijay Deverakonda, Ananya Panday | A young fighter with a speech disorder trains to become an MMA champion while overcoming personal and professional challenges. | |
| Brahmāstra: Part One – Shiva (Note: The film was co-produced with Star Studios, Prime Focus and Starlight Pictures) | 2022 | Ayan Mukerji | Karan Johar, Hiroo Johar, Apoorva Mehta, Ranbir Kapoor, Namit Malhotra, Marijke DeSouza, Ayan Mukerji | Ranbir Kapoor, Alia Bhatt, Amitabh Bachchan, Mouni Roy, Nagarjuna | An orphan discovers he holds the power of the Agneyastra and shares a deep connection with the mighty Brahmastra. | |
| Govinda Naam Mera (Note: The film was released digitally on Hotstar.) | 2022 | Shashank Khaitan | Karan Johar, Hiroo Johar, Apoorva Mehta; Shashank Khaitan | Vicky Kaushal, Kiara Advani, Bhumi Pednekar | Caught between a court case, a failing marriage, and his girlfriend, a man finds his life spiraling into deeper chaos. | |
| Selfiee (Note: The film was co-produced with Cape of Good Films, Prithviraj Productions and Magic Frames.) | 2023 | Raj Mehta | Karan Johar; Prithviraj Sukumaran, Aruna Bhatia, Hiroo Johar, Apoorva Mehta | Akshay Kumar, Emraan Hashmi, Nushrratt Bharuccha, Diana Penty | A popular actor's lost driving licence leads to a clash with a motor inspector who is also his fan. | |
| Rocky Aur Rani Kii Prem Kahaani (Note: The film was co-produced with Viacom18 Studios.) | 2023 | Karan Johar | Karan Johar; Hiroo Johar, Apoorva Mehta | Dharmendra, Jaya Bachchan, Shabana Azmi, Ranveer Singh, Alia Bhatt | A couple with contrasting personalities decide to live with each other's families for three months before getting married. | |
| Kill (Note: The film was co-produced with Sikhya Entertainment.) | 2023 | Nikhil Nagesh Bhat | Karan Johar, Apoorva Mehta, Guneet Monga, Achin Jain | Lakshya, Raghav Juyal, Tanya Maniktala | When armed bandits attack a passenger train, two commandos onboard fight to protect the lives of fellow travelers. | |
| Yodha (Note: The film was co-produced with Amazon MGM Studios and Mentor Disciple Entertainment.) | 2024 | Sagar Ambre, Pushkar Ojha | Karan Johar, Hiroo Johar, Apoorva Mehta, Shashank Khaitan | Sidharth Malhotra, Raashii Khanna, Disha Patani | An off-duty soldier must save passengers after terrorists hijack a plane and its engine fails. | |
| Mr. & Mrs. Mahi (Note: The film was co-produced with Zee Studios.) | 2024 | Sharan Sharma | Karan Johar, Hiroo Johar, Apoorva Mehta | Rajkummar Rao, Janhvi Kapoor | A cricket-loving couple starts training together after the wife's natural talent shines through. | |
| Bad Newz (Note: The film was co-produced with Leo Media Collective and Amazon Prime.) | 2024 | Anand Tiwari | Karan Johar; Hiroo Johar, Apoorva Mehta; Amritpal Singh Bindra; Anand Tiwari | Vicky Kaushal, Tripti Dimri, Ammy Virk | A woman's life turns chaotic when she discovers she's pregnant with twins from two different fathers. | |
| Jigra (Note: The film was co-produced with Eternal Sunshine Productions.) | 2024 | Vasan Bala | Karan Johar, Apoorva Mehta, Alia Bhatt | Alia Bhatt, Vedang Raina | A young woman races to save her brother from death row after he's wrongly imprisoned abroad. | |
| Kesari Chapter 2 (Note: The film was co-produced with Leo Media Collective and Cape of Good Films.) | 2025 | Karan Singh Tyagi | Karan Johar, Apoorva Mehta, Anand Tiwari | Akshay Kumar, R. Madhavan, Ananya Panday | A lawyer fights to expose the truth behind the Jallianwala Bagh massacre and seek justice for the victims. | |
| Homebound | 2025 | Neeraj Ghaywan | Karan Johar, Adar Poonawalla, Apoorva Mehta, Somen Mishra | Ishaan Khatter, Vishal Jethwa, Janhvi Kapoor | Two childhood friends, who attempt to pass the national police exam. | |
| Sarzameen (Note: The film was co-produced with Star Studios) (Note: The film was released digitally on JioHotstar.) | 2025 | Kayoze Irani | Karan Johar, Hiroo Yash Johar, Apoorva Mehta, Adar Poonawalla | Prithviraj Sukumaran, Kajol, Ibrahim Ali Khan | An Army officer will stop at nothing to free Kashmir valley from terrorism, even if it means paying a terrible price. | |
| Dhadak 2 (Note: The film was co-produced with Zee Studios and Cloud 9 Pictures) | 2025 | Shazia Iqbal | Karan Johar, Umesh Kumar Bansal, Adar Poonawalla, Apoorva Mehta, Meenu Aroraa, Somen Mishra, Pragati Deshmukh | Triptii Dimri, Siddhant Chaturvedi | The burgeoning romance between two law students is severely tested by rising social and family tensions. | |
| Sunny Sanskari Ki Tulsi Kumari (Note: The film was co-produced with Mentor Disciple Entertainment) | 2025 | Shashank Khaitan | Karan Johar, Hiroo Yash Johar; Apoorva Mehta; Adar Poonawalla | Varun Dhawan, Janhvi Kapoor, Sanya Malhotra, Rohit Saraf | After a failed proposal, a man conspires with a broken-hearted woman to sabotage the wedding of their exes. | |
| Tu Meri Main Tera Main Tera Tu Meri (Note: The film was co-produced with Namah Pictures) | 2025 | Sameer Vidwans | Karan Johar, Shareen Mantri Kedia, Kishor Arora, Adar Poonawalla, Apoorva Mehta | Kartik Aaryan, Ananya Panday | Two people fall in love while finding themselves, but family pressures challenge their relationship. They part, hoping to meet again. | |
| Chand Mera Dil | 2026 | Vivek Soni | Hiroo Yash Johar, Karan Johar, Apoorva Mehta, Adar Poonawalla, Somen Mishra, Marijke Desouza | Lakshya, Ananya Panday | Chronicles the intertwined lives of engineering students as they navigate academic challenges, forge friendships, and discover themselves in university. | |
| Udta Teer (Note: The film was co-produced with Sikhya Entertainment) | 2026 | Aakash Kaushik | Karan Johar, Apoorva Mehta, Adar Poonawalla, Guneet Monga, Achin Jain | Ayushmann Khurrana, Sara Ali Khan | A Pakistani spy begins working for Indian counter-intelligence after losing his memory. | |
| Naagzilla† (Note: The film was co-produced with Mahaveer Jain Films) | 2027 | Mrighdeep Singh Lamba | Karan Johar, Apoorva Mehta, Adar Poonawalla, Mahaveer Jain, Mrighdeep Singh Lamba, Neetu M. Jain, Marijke Desouza, Divyansh Jain | Kartik Aaryan, Ravi Kishan, Preity Mukhundhan | TBA | |
| Lag Ja Gale† | 2027 | Raj Mehta | Karan Johar, Apoorva Mehta, Adar Poonawalla | Tiger Shroff, Janhvi Kapoor, Lakshya | TBA | |
| Kaaliya† (Note: The film was co-produced with Dopamine Studios) | 2028 | Sandeep Modi | Karan Johar, Adar Poonawalla, Apoorva Mehta, Somen Mishra, Marijke Desouza, Kartik Aaryan | Kartik Aaryan | TBA | |

== Films distributed ==
In addition to the films produced, the following films were distributed by the company:

Key
| † | Denotes films that have not yet been released |

| Year | Title | Language | Ref. |
|---|---|---|---|
| 2013 | The Lunchbox | Hindi; English | |
| 2015 | Baahubali: The Beginning | Telugu | |
| 2017 | The Ghazi Attack | Telugu | |
| 2017 | Baahubali 2: The Conclusion | Telugu | |
| 2018 | Bucket List | Marathi | |
| 2018 | 2.0 | Tamil | |
| 2024 | Devara: Part 1 | Telugu | |
| 2025 | Akaal: The Unconquered | Punjabi | |
| 2025 | Ye Re Ye Re Paisa 3 | Marathi | |
| 2025 | Mirai | Telugu | |
| 2025 | Ikk Kudi | Punjabi | |
| 2025 | Kaantha | Tamil | |
| 2026 | Chatha Pacha | Malayalam | |
| 2026 | Viyaah Kartaare Da | Punjabi | |
| 2026 | Jindagi Once More | Gujarati | |
| 2026 | G.D.N | Tamil | |
| 2026 | DC | Tamil | |
| 2026 | Mitti De Putt | Punjabi | |
| 2026 | Ramayana: Part 1 | Hindi | |
| 2026 | Cosmic Samson † | Malayalam | |
| 2027 | Navrup † | Odia | |
| 2028 | Ramayana: Part 2 † | Hindi | |
