= List of Star Studio18 films =

This is a list of films produced by Star Studio18, Star Studios and Fox Star Studios names. All films listed are theatrical releases unless specified. Films labeled with a ‡ symbol signify a streaming release exclusively through JioHotstar.

== As Fox Star Studios ==
Release date	Title	Language	Director	Notes	Ref.
23 January 2009	Slumdog Millionaire	English	Danny Boyle	Indian and Pakistani distribution only; produced by Film4 Productions and Celador Films	
28 August 2009	Quick Gun Murugun	English	Shashanka Ghosh	Co-produced with Phat Phish Motion Pictures; studio's debut film under the Fox Star Studios name	
12 February 2010	My Name Is Khan	Hindi	Karan Johar	distribution only; produced by Dharma Productions & Red Chillies Entertainment.	
1 October 2010	Khichdi: The Movie	Hindi	Aatish Kapadia	distribution only; produced by Hats Off Productions	
22 April 2011	Dum Maaro Dum	Hindi	Rohan Sippy	distribution only; produced by Ramesh Sippy Entertainment, Louverture Films and Cheyenne Enterprises	
13 May 2011	Stanley Ka Dabba	Hindi	Amole Gupte	Co-produced with Amole Gupte Cinema	
16 September 2011	Engaeyum Eppothum	Tamil	M Saravanan	Co-produced with AR Murugadoss Productions	
30 September 2011	Force	Hindi	Nishikant Kamat	distribution only, produced by Sunshine Pictures	
3 February 2012	Second Show	Malayalam	Srinath Rajendran		
17 February 2012	Ekk Deewana Tha	Hindi	Gautham Vasudev Menon	Co-produced with RS Infotainment	
2 March 2012	London, Paris, New York	Hindi	Anu Menon	distribution only; produced by Rose Movies	
4 May 2012	Jannat 2	Hindi	Kunal Deshmukh	distribution only; produced by Vishesh Films	
6 July 2012	Bol Bachchan	Hindi	Rohit Shetty	distribution only, produced by Ajay Devgn FFilms and Shree Ashtavinayak Cine Vision	
7 September 2012	Raaz 3D	Hindi	Vikram Bhatt	distribution only; produced by Vishesh Films	
11 January 2013	Matru Ki Bijlee Ka Mandola	Hindi	Vishal Bharadwaj	Co-produced with VB Pictures	
15 February 2013	Murder 3	Hindi	Vishesh Bhatt	distribution only; produced by Vishesh Films	
15 March 2013	Jolly LLB	Hindi	Subhash Kapoor		
15 March 2013	Vathikuchi	Tamil	Kinslin	Co-produced with AR Murugadoss Productions	
27 September 2013	Raja Rani	Tamil	Atlee Kumar	Co-produced with AR Murugadoss Productions and The Next Big Film Productions	
29 November 2013	Bullett Raja	Hindi	Tigmanshu Dhulia	distribution only; produced by BrandSmith Motion Pictures and Moving Pictures	
21 March 2014	Cuckoo	Tamil	Raju Murugan	Co-produced with The Next Big Film Productions	
9 May 2014	Hawaa Hawaai	Hindi	Amole Gupte	Co-produced with Amole Gupte Cinema	
30 May 2014	CityLights	Hindi	Hansal Mehta	distribution only; produced by Vishesh Films	
13 June 2014	Mundaasupatti	Tamil	Ram Kumar	Co-produced with Thirukumaran Entertainment	
20 June 2014	Humshakals	Hindi	Sajid Khan	Co-produced with Pooja Entertainment	
12 September 2014	Finding Fanny	English	Homi Adajania	distribution only; produced by Maddock Films also dubbed in Hindi	
2 October 2014	Bang Bang!	Hindi	Siddharth Anand		
30 January 2015	Khamoshiyan	Hindi	Karan Darra	distribution only; produced by Vishesh Films	
13 March 2015	Rajathandhiram	Tamil	AG Amid	distribution only; produced by Sunland Cinemas and White Bucket Productions	
10 April 2015	Broken Horses	English	Vidhu Vinod Chopra	distribution only; produced by Reliance Entertainment and Vinod Chopra Films	
17 April 2015	Mr. X	Hindi	Vikram Bhatt	distribution only; produced by Vishesh Films	
15 May 2015	Bombay Velvet	Hindi	Anurag Kashyap	distribution only; produced by Phantom Films	
5 June 2015	Kaaka Muttai	Tamil	M. Manikandan	distribution only; produced by Wunderbar Films and Grass Root Film Company	
12 June 2015	Hamari Adhuri Kahani	Hindi	Mohit Suri	distribution only; produced by Vishesh Films	
26 June 2015	Miss Tanakpur Haazir Ho	Hindi	Vinod Kapri	produced by Crossword Films and NG Film Crafts	
3 July 2015	Guddu Rangeela	Hindi	Subhash Kapoor	produced by Mangl Murti Films	
14 August 2015	Brothers	Hindi	Karan Malhotra	distribution only; produced by Lionsgate, Dharma Productions, and Endemol India	
21 October 2015	10 Enradhukulla	Tamil	Vijay Milton	Co-produced with AR Murugadoss Productions	
22 October 2015	Shaandaar	Hindi	Vikas Bahl	distribution only; produced by Phantom Films and Dharma Productions	
12 November 2015	Prem Ratan Dhan Payo	Hindi	Sooraj Barjatya	distribution only; produced by Rajshri Productions	
19 February 2016	Neerja	Hindi	Ram Madhvani	National Film Award for Best Feature Film in Hindi	
18 March 2016	Kapoor & Sons	Hindi	Shakun Batra	distribution only; produced by Dharma Productions	
29 April 2016	Manithan	Tamil	I. Ahmed	distribution only; produced by Red Giant Movies	
6 May 2016	Traffic	Hindi	Rajesh Pillai	distribution only; produced by Endemol India	
3 June 2016	Velainu Vandhutta Vellaikaaran	Tamil	Ezhil	distribution only; produced by Vishnu Vishal Studioz and Ezhilmaaran Production	
22 July 2016	Half Ticket	Marathi	Samit Kakkad	distribution only; produced by Video Palace	
22 July 2016	Kabali	Tamil	Pa. Ranjith	distribution only; produced by V Creations	
2 September 2016	Akira	Hindi	AR Murugadoss	distribution only; produced by A.R.Murugadoss Productions	
30 September 2016	M.S. Dhoni: The Untold Story	Hindi	Neeraj Pandey	also released in Tamil, Telugu and Marathi versions	
28 October 2016	Ae Dil Hai Mushkil	Hindi	Karan Johar	distribution only; produced by Dharma Productions	
13 January 2017	Ok Jaanu	Hindi	Shaad Ali	distribution only; produced by Madras Talkies and Dharma Productions	
10 February 2017	Jolly LLB 2	Hindi	Subhash Kapoor		
10 March 2017	Badrinath Ki Dulhania	Hindi	Shashank Khaitan	distribution only, produced by Dharma Productions	
24 March 2017	Phillauri	Hindi	Anshai Lal	Co-produced with Clean Slate Films	
19 May 2017	Sangili Bungili Kadhava Thorae	Tamil	Ike	Co-produced with A for Apple Production	
9 June 2017	Rangoon	Tamil	Rajkumar Periasamy	Co-produced with AR Murugadoss Productions	
25 August 2017	A Gentleman	Hindi	Raj Nidimoru and Krishna D.K.		
8 September 2017	Katha Nayagan	Tamil	Tha. Muruganantham	distribution only; produced by Vishnu Vishal Studioz	
29 September 2017	Judwaa 2	Hindi	David Dhawan	distribution only; produced by Nadiadwala Grandson Entertainment	
30 March 2018	Baaghi 2	Hindi	Ahmed Khan	distribution only; produced by Nadiadwala Grandson Entertainment	
25 May 2018	Bioscopewala	Hindi	Deb Medhekar	Co-produced with Handmade Films	
29 June 2018	Sanju	Hindi	Rajkumar Hirani	distribution only; produced by Rajkumar Hirani Films and Vinod Chopra Films	
1 February 2019	Ek Ladki Ko Dekha Toh Aisa Laga	Hindi	Shelly Chopra Dhar	distribution only; produced by Vinod Chopra Films	
22 February 2019	Total Dhamaal	Hindi	Indra Kumar	Co-produced with Ajay Devgn FFilms, Maruti International, Pen Studios and Mangl Murti Films; last film produced by Fox Star Studios before the acquisition by Disney	
17 April 2019	Kalank	Hindi	Abhishek Varman	Co-produced by Dharma Productions and Nadiadwala Grandson Entertainment; first film to be released after the acquisition by Disney	
10 May 2019	Student of the Year 2	Hindi	Punit Malhotra	Co-produced with Dharma Productions	
24 May 2019	India's Most Wanted	Hindi	Raj Kumar Gupta	Co-produced with Raapchik Films	
15 August 2019	Mission Mangal	Hindi	Jagan Shakti	Co-produced with Cape of Good Films, Hope Productions	
6 September 2019	Chhichhore	Hindi	Nitesh Tiwari	Co-produced with Nadiadwala Grandson Entertainment	
20 September 2019	The Zoya Factor	Hindi	Abhishek Sharma	Co-produced with Adlabs Films	
25 October 2019	Housefull 4	Hindi	Farhad Samji	Co-produced with Nadiadwala Grandson Entertainment	
10 January 2020	Chhapaak	Hindi	Meghna Gulzar	Co-produced with Ka Productions and Mriga Films	
24 January 2020	Panga	Hindi	Ashwiny Iyer Tiwari		
7 February 2020	Shikara	Hindi	Vidhu Vinod Chopra	distribution only; produced by Vinod Chopra Films	
6 March 2020	Baaghi 3	Hindi	Ahmed Khan	Co-produced with Nadiadwala Grandson Entertainment	
24 July 2020	Dil Bechara ‡	Hindi	Mukesh Chhabra		
31 July 2020	Lootcase ‡	Hindi	Rajesh A Krishnan	Co-produced with Soda Films	
28 August 2020	Sadak 2 ‡	Hindi	Mahesh Bhatt	Co-produced with Vishesh Films	
9 November 2020	Laxmii ‡	Hindi	Raghava Lawrence	co-produced with Cape Of Good Studios, Shabinaa Entertainment and Tusshar Entertainment House	
3 December 2021	Tadap	Hindi	Milan Luthria	co-produced with Nadiadwala Grandson Entertainment	
1 April 2022	Kaun Pravin Tambe? ‡	Hindi	Jayprad Desai	Co-produced with Friday Filmworks and Bootroom Sports; distributed by Disney+ Hotstar in India. Last film released under the name: Fox Star Studios before it was renamed to Star Studios by Disney on May 27, 2022	

== As Star Studios ==
Release date	Title	Language	Director	Notes
9 September 2022	Brahmāstra: Part One – Shiva	Hindi	Ayan Mukerji	Co-production with Dharma Productions, Prime Focus and Starlight Pictures; Distributed in international by Walt Disney Studios Motion Pictures and United States by 20th Century Studios; first film released under the Star Studios name
23 September 2022	Babli Bouncer ‡	Hindi	Madhur Bhandarkar	Co-produced with Junglee Pictures; distributed by Disney+ Hotstar.
24 February 2023	Selfiee	Hindi	Raj Mehta	Co-produced with Dharma Productions, Prithviraj Productions, Magic Frames and Cape Of Good Films.
3 March 2023	Gulmohar ‡	Hindi	Rahul V. Chittella	Co-produced with Chalkboard Entertainment and Autonomous Works; distributed by Disney+ Hotstar.
29 September 2023	Tumse Na Ho Payega ‡	Hindi	Abhishek Sinha	Co-produced with RSVP Movies, Roy Kapur Films and Earthsky Pictures; distributed by Disney+ Hotstar.
15 November 2023	Apurva ‡	Hindi	Nikhil Nagesh Bhat	Co-produced with Cine1 Studios; distributed by Disney+ Hotstar.
25 July 2025	Sarzameen ‡	Hindi	Kayoze Irani	Co-production with Dharma Productions; distributed by JioHotstar. Last film released under the name: Star Studios before it was renamed to Star Studio18

== As Star Studio18 ==
Release date	Title	Language	Director	Notes
19 September 2025	Jolly LLB 3	Hindi	Subhash Kapoor	co-production with Kangra Talkies; first film released under the Star Studio18 name; also distributor
31 October 2025	Single Salma	Hindi	Nachiket Samant	co-production with Elemen3 Entertainment; also distributor
12 December 2025	Kis Kisko Pyaar Karoon 2	Hindi	Anukalp Goswami	co-production with Venus Worldwide Entertainment and Abbas Mustan Films Production; also distributor
12 December 2025	The Great Shamsuddin Family ‡	Hindi	Anusha Rizvi	co-production with Third World Films; released on JioHotstar
24 April 2026	Dev.D	Hindi	Anurag Kashyap	re-release in association with PVR Inox Pictures; originally distributed by UTV Motion Pictures
26 June 2026	Welcome to the Jungle	Hindi	Ahmed Khan	co-production with Cape of Good Films, Seeta Films and Base Industries Group; also distributor
1 October 2026	Baththa	Tamil	Balaji Tharaneetharan	co-production with Cine1 Studios and A for Apple Studios
2 October 2026	Drishyam: The Conclusion	Hindi	Abhishek Pathak	co-production with Panorama Studios; also distributor

== Upcoming films ==
Release date	Title	Language	Director	Notes
TBA	Chiranjeevi Hanuman – The Eternal	Hindi	Rajesh Mapuskar	co-production with Abundantia Entertainment, Collective Studios and Historyverse
