= Gippi =

2013 Hindi-language teen drama film

- Theatrical release poster
- Directed by: Sonam Nair
- Written by: Sonam Nair
- Produced by: Hiroo Yash Johar; Karan Johar
- Starring: Riya Vij; Taaha Shah; Divya Dutta
- Cinematography: Anshuman Mahaley
- Edited by: Yashashwini Y.P
- Music by: Songs: Vishal–Shekhar; Score: John Stewart Eduri
- Production company: Dharma Productions
- Distributed by: UTV Motion Pictures
- Release date: 10 May 2013
- Running time: 95 minutes
- Country: India
- Language: Hindi

Gippi is an Indian Hindi-language teen drama film written and directed by Sonam Nair and produced by Hiroo Yash Johar and Karan Johar under the Dharma Productions banner, with UTV Motion Pictures serving as distributor. The film stars newcomer Riya Vij and Taaha Shah in lead roles. It was released on 10 May 2013.

== Cast ==
- Riya Vij as Gurpreet "Gippi" Kaur
- Jayati Modi as Shamira Chauhan
- Taaha Shah as Arjun
- Avanti Talwar as Tania
- Anah Talwar as Sonia
- Divya Dutta as Pardeep "Pappi" Kaur
- Raqesh Vashisth as Chemistry teacher
- Pankaj Dheer as Papa Paaji
- Mrinal Chawla as Kabir
- Doorva Tripathi as Anchal
- Aditya Deshpande as Ashish Saraswat

== Soundtrack ==
Gippi

Soundtrack album by Vishal–Shekhar
- Released: 22 April 2013
- Genre: Feature film soundtrack
- Length: 5:20
- Language: Hindi
- Label: Sony Music India
- Producer: Karan Johar

Vishal–Shekhar chronology
Student of the Year (2012)	Gippi (2013)	Chennai Express (2013)

The music was composed by Vishal–Shekhar, with lyrics by Anvita Dutt Guptan & Vishal Dadlani. the music label is on Sony Music.

#	Title	Singer(s)
1	"Baby Se Baby Doll"	Udit Narayan & Sukhwinder Singh
2	"Pehn Di Takki"	Vishal Dadlani
3	"Mann Baavra"	Shekhar Ravjiani
4	"Dil Kaagzi"	Neeti Mohan
5	"We Are Like This Only"	Vishal Dadlani, Shekhar Ravjiani & Hard Kaur

== Critical reception ==
The film received mixed reviews from the critics.

Kshamaya Daniel for Rediff.com has given 4/5 stars and says Gippi is a movie meant for teens, and that it has all the necessary teen masala—romance, a makeover, cheesy humour and loud music. Taran Adarsh of Bollywood Hungama gave the movie a rating of 3.5/5 stars and said "On the whole, GIPPI is a credible take on the 'coming-of-age' variety of movies. This one's straight from the heart. Sweet, simple, emotionally engaging, heart-warming cinema!" Madhureeta Mukherjee of the Times of India gave the movie 3/5 stars, mentioning "Sonam Nair's 'coming of puberty' film handles simple issues sensitively, though it doesn't delve too deep. The subtlety appeals, but lacks drama in the second half, with a mediocre climax." in.com also gave the film a favourable review saying it would "take adults down memory lane while connecting with teenagers at the same time." Rajeev Masand from CNN-IBN gave the movie 2/5 stars, saying that "Ultimately, this could have been a sweet, unusual tale about the triumph of a nerd, yet it's let down by its affected tone."
