= Sarzameen =

2025 Indian film by Kayoze Irani

- Official release poster
- Directed by: Kayoze Irani
- Written by: Soumil Shukla; Arun Singh
- Dialogues by: Kausar Munir; Jehan Handa
- Produced by: Karan Johar; Hiroo Yash Johar; Apoorva Mehta; Adar Poonawalla
- Starring: Prithviraj Sukumaran; Kajol; Ibrahim Ali Khan
- Cinematography: Kamaljeet Negi
- Edited by: Nitin Baid; Sanyukta Kaza
- Music by: Songs: Vishal Khurana K Vishal Mishra; Score: Tanuj Tiku
- Production companies: Star Studios; Dharma Productions
- Distributed by: JioHotstar
- Release date: 25 July 2025
- Running time: 137 minutes
- Country: India
- Language: Hindi

Sarzameen (transl. Nation/Country) is a 2025 Indian Hindi-language action thriller film written and directed by Kayoze Irani, in his directorial debut. Produced by Karan Johar, Hiroo Yash Johar, and Apoorva Mehta under Dharma Productions, in collaboration with Star Studios, the film stars Prithviraj Sukumaran, Kajol, and Ibrahim Ali Khan. Set in Kashmir, the film follows an Indian Army officer who discovers that his estranged son has joined a militant group.

Sarzameen was released on 25 July 2025 on the streaming platform JioHotstar and received negative reviews from critics. This was the last film to be released under the Star Studios name before being rebranded to Star Studio18 in August 2025.

== Plot ==
Colonel Vijay Menon, a decorated Indian Army officer posted in Jammu & Kashmir, captures two terrorists — Mohsin and his brothers Aabil and Qaabil. In retaliation, the terrorists kidnap his young son Harman, demanding the release of their men. Despite his wife Meher's pleas, Vijay refuses to compromise national security. He executes Aabil and declares that the safety of the nation comes before personal ties.

During a rescue operation in a terrorist camp, the Army finds several hostages — among them is a now-adult Harman. Meher welcomes him back joyfully, but Vijay suspects that his son might have been replaced or brainwashed. A DNA test confirms that Harman is indeed their biological son.

Years in captivity have left Harman deeply radicalized under Qaabil's influence. His loyalty to extremist ideology clashes with his family's attempts to reconnect. Meher tries to restore emotional ties, while Vijay remains guarded, aware of the threat Harman may pose.

The growing distrust leads to a confrontation where Harman, armed, faces his father. In the chaos, Meher is accidentally shot and injured. Overwhelmed by confusion and guilt, Harman flees.

Qaabil plans a massive bombing at a dam inauguration, which Harman is unknowingly drawn into. A major revelation follows — Meher is revealed to have been an undercover Pakistani Intelligence operative. Meher captures Qaabil, extracts the bomb deactivation code, and sends it to Vijay.

Vijay and Harman work together to deactivate the bomb in time. In a final act of redemption, Harman risks his life to stop another attacker. The attack is foiled, but Meher dies from her injuries. The film ends with Vijay and Harman mourning Meher's sacrifice, united by her legacy of duty and betrayal.

== Cast ==
- Prithviraj Sukumaran as Colonel (later Brigadier) Vijay Menon
- Kajol as Meherunissa "Meher" Menon, Vijay's wife a.k.a. Mohsin
- Ibrahim Ali Khan as Harman Menon, Vijay and Meher's son
  - Ronav Parihar as young Harman
- Boman Irani as Lt. General I. S Kanwar
- Jitendra Joshi as Colonel Ahmed Iqbal
- Mihir Ahuja as Shoaib Matto
- K.C. Shankar as Qaabil Bhatt / Tunda Chacha
- Rohed Khan as Aabil Bhatt
- Anurag Arora as Colonel Shriram Menon

== Production ==
Sarzameen was announced in 2023 as a co-production between Dharma Productions and Star Studios, starring Prithviraj Sukumaran, Kajol, and Ibrahim Ali Khan. It marks the directorial debut Kayoze Irani, the son of actor Boman Irani. The project was initially developed with a focus on familial and ideological conflict set within the socio-political context of Kashmir.

== Soundtrack ==
Sarzameen

Soundtrack album by Vishal Khurana K, Vishal Mishra
- Released: 16 July 2025
- Genre: Feature film soundtrack
- Length: 32:20
- Language: Hindi
- Label: Saregama

Official audio
- Sarzameen Full Album on YouTube

The film's soundtrack is composed by Vishal Khurana K and Vishal Mishra, with the lyrics written by Kausar Munir and Jaani.

Track listing
No.	Title	Singer(s)	Length
1.	"Mere Murshid Mere Yaara" (Music by Vishal Mishra, lyrics by Jaani)	Vishal Mishra, Salman Ali	3:57
2.	"Ve Mahiya"	B Praak	4:21
3.	"Aaj Ruk Jaa"	Shreya Ghoshal	3:37
4.	"Aa Gale Lag Jaa"	Sonu Nigam	4:13
5.	"Watna Ve"	Javed Ali	4:40
6.	"Aaj Ruk Jaa"	Mohit Chauhan	3:38
7.	"Aa Gale Lag Jaa"	Shreya Ghoshal	3:23
8.	"Aa Gale Lag Jaa"	Sonu Nigam, Shreya Ghoshal	4:31
Total length:			32:20

== Release ==
Sarzameen premiered on JioHotstar on 25 July 2025.

== Reception ==
Shubhra Gupta of The Indian Express gave 1.5 stars out of 5 and said that "Prithviraj is capable of ratcheting emotion, as is Kajol. And Ibrahim, playing a boy cruelly bullied for an impairment who grows into a young man on the opposite side of the loyalty divide." Vineeta Kumar of India Today also gave 1.5 stars out of 5 and said that "In this Ibrahim Ali Khan, Kajol and Prithviraj Sukumaran-starrer, neither the patriotism lands nor the emotional family drama connects. What you get instead is a hollow story trying hard to feel important." Rahul Desai of The Hollywood Reporter India commented that "Given that Sarzameen is a Dharma Productions film, you can detect a collision of eras and sensibilities: vintage “It’s all about loving your family” v/s new-age “It’s all about loving your nation”.

Anuj Kumar of The Hindu observed that "Kayoze Irani has put the ingredients for a poignant roller coaster on the burner, but ‘Sarzameen’, starring Prithviraj Sukumaran, Kajol and Ibrahim Ali Khan, turns out to be utterly undercooked." Syed Firdaus Ashraf of Rediff.com rated it 1.5/5 stars and said that "Poor writing, unrealistic plot points, and weak performances drag Sarzameen down." Shreyanka Mazumdar of News18 rated it 2/5 stars and said that "Sarzameen does move briskly and throws up big emotional moments but tries hard to make a statement, ending up saying nothing clearly."

Radhika Sharma of NDTV gave it 2 stars out of 5 and felt that "Sarzameen is a film with good intentions that works in parts. Another plus is that it's a story steeped in patriotism without the normalised chest-thumping or direct Pakistan bashing.⁣ Film Critic Sucharita Tyagi writes in her review that "So, on a scale of 1 to 10 Sarzameen is, 1 more film where you wonder if Mihir Ahuja had played the main role instead of the support cast, how much of a difference that would have made. Vinamra Mathur of Firstpost gave Sarzameen a 2 out of 5 rating, noting that the most puzzling part of the film is its climax—a twist that isn’t explored to its full potential. According to him, the filmmakers are more focused on loudly delivering a message about humanity and hate, while the two talented lead actors deliver some of their flattest performances in recent memory."

Troy Ribeiro of Free Press Journal described Sarzameen which means "homeland"—as more of a compilation of patriotic stereotypes and emotional clichés than a genuine film. He remarked that while the film tries hard to evoke emotion, it does so by dictating exactly what the audience should feel and when. Though sincere in its tone, the film follows a predictable formula and suffers from outdated storytelling and heavy-handed execution. Nandini Ramnath of Scroll.in said "Sarzameen delivers one of the most absurd and ridiculous plot twists in recent memory. The laughable revelation completely undermines Vijay’s hard-earned image as a decorated officer. It leaves you wondering—where was the Army’s intelligence, or even just common sense?"
