= Yodha (2024 film) =

2024 Indian film by Sagar Ambre & Pushkar Ojha

- Theatrical release poster
- Directed by: Sagar Ambre; Pushkar Ojha
- Written by: Sagar Ambre
- Produced by: Hiroo Yash Johar; Karan Johar; Apoorva Mehta; Shashank Khaitan
- Starring: Siddharth Malhotra; Raashii Khanna; Disha Patani
- Cinematography: Jishnu Bhattacharjee
- Edited by: Shivkumar V. Panicker
- Music by: Songs: Tanishk Bagchi; Vishal Mishra; B Praak; Aditya Dev; John Stewart Eduri; Score: John Stewart Eduri
- Production companies: Amazon MGM Studios; Dharma Productions; Mentor Disciple Entertainment
- Distributed by: AA Films
- Release date: 15 March 2024
- Running time: 130 minutes
- Country: India
- Language: Hindi
- Budget: ₹55 crore
- Box office: ₹53.68 crore

Yodha (transl. Warrior) is a 2024 Indian Hindi-language action thriller film directed by Sagar Ambre and Pushkar Ojha, written by Ambre, and produced by Amazon Prime Video, Dharma Productions and Mentor Disciple Entertainment. The film stars Sidharth Malhotra, Raashii Khanna and Disha Patani. Marking Mentor Disciple founder Shashank Khaitan's first collaboration with Malhotra, whose fellow debutantes Alia Bhatt and Varun Dhawan starred in Khaitan's first two films, it follows a disgraced commando's efforts to vindicate himself as he attempts to steer clear his name and restore lost glory to his father's titular elite task force while on a mission to prevent a passenger airplane from getting hijacked, years after a botched up rescue operation led to the task force being closed down.

After multiple release postponements, Yodha was theatrically released on 15 March 2024 to mixed reviews from critics and became a commercial failure.

== Plot ==
Arun Katyal, son of martyred Major Surender Katyal, founder of the Yodha task force, takes up leadership of the task force after his father as he becomes an officer in the Indian Army. A para commando trained in land, water and air combat like the rest of the officers in the task force, he lives with his intelligence officer wife Priyamvada "Priya" Katyal and his mother, and has a sure friend and ally in fellow officer Sameer Khan. After a successful mission, he apologizes to Priya for disobeying commands from the intelligence. During a mission where he is unofficially assigned to the security of reputed nuclear scientist Dr. Anuj Nair, the flight gets hijacked by Lashkar-e-Taiba terrorists. Despite his best efforts to contain the terrorists until such time as the Yodha team, having been signaled to action, can intercept, however, he is kicked out of the plane while trying to protect Nair, whose identity is made known to the terrorists; Nair is later revealed to have been killed and his body returned to India with the flight despite the government agreeing to the terrorists' demands. An investigation is called on by the Indian government, with Yodha being suspended and its members scrambling to build alternate careers after Priya admits to Arun's violations despite his pleas. The suspension brings about a rift between them as Priya leaves Arun while taking his mother with her. Arun is considered a traitor by ministers and the general public.

Some years later, Arun, who is living a quiet, dubious life, is mysteriously redirected to board a different flight while at an airport. Once aboard, he strongly suspects a hijack attempt and seemingly kills one Amandeep Singh who he believes is a terrorist. However, before he can put two and two together with the help of fellow passenger Tanya Sharma, a flying expert, and flight attendant Laila Khalid, he is suddenly sabotaged and betrayed by Laila, who reveals herself to be the prime hijacker, with her brother Ahmed on board as pilot; Amandeep was actually an Indian officer and was poisoned by Laila, and she and Khalid are part of a Kashmiri secessionist group. An intense combat follows, with Arun managing to overpower and kill brother and sister while Tanya assumes control of the flight, during which time news is leaked to the Pakistani media that a rogue Indian Army officer has hijacked a flight to Islamabad and is targeting the India—Pakistan Peace Summit involving the Heads of State, projecting Arun in poor light.

Rafiq, a member of the Pakistani Head of State's consulate, initially brings the Pakistani security chief and the Indian Head of State, accompanied by Priya, who is also part of the summit and has been apprised of Arun's involvement in the hijack, to a control room to supervise the situation, but reveals in a twist after killing his own Head of State that he is opposed to the Peace Summit. He takes the Indian Head of State and Priya hostage and tries to blackmail Arun, who deduces that he is in fact Jalal, the terrorist who kicked him out of the flight containing Nair. After much deliberation and a conversation with Priya who realizes he hasn't gone rogue after all, Arun manages to save the flight from crashing into its target, a mosque where the Pakistani Head of State is presently offering prayers, with support from Tanya. Jalal and his men, in the meantime, occupy the Pakistani Head of State's Office and force the people out, killing counterterrorist officers from the Pakistani Army.

Arun arrives in the nick of time to eliminate the terrorists and manages to barge into the Office premises killing several of Jalal's men, but is shorted by Jalal when he holds the Indian Head of State and Priya at gunpoint. Forcing him to talk to Priya, Jalal details his ambitions to sustain terrorism in Kashmir, calling it a "business" he cannot afford to see collapsing; in a coded conversation, Arun realizes Priya hasn't signed the divorce papers and signals her the same way he did while trying to save Nair, ultimately overpowering Jalal and his men; Priya escapes with the Indian Head of State, unharmed, while the other Indian consulate members engage in combat to defend them. Arun manages to snap the detonator to the bombs in the premises out of Jalal's jacket and toss it to Priya, who disables it; Arun and Jalal engage in a one—to—one fight before the former impales the latter. When Jalal taunts Arun, claiming peace can never prevail in Kashmir, he shoots one of the explosives after tossing it mid—air and kills him, having survived an impactful blast, and reunites with Priya.

Days into the entire episode, in a mid-credits scene, the Indian Head of State officially reinstates the Yodha task force after Arun is rewarded for his bravery and actions.

== Cast ==
- Sidharth Malhotra as Major Arun Katyal, an army officer and a member of the Yodha Task Force
- Raashii Khanna as Priyamvada "Priya" Katyal, Arun's wife
- Disha Patani as Laila Khalid, a flight attendant
- Ronit Roy as Major Surender Katyal, Arun's father and the founder of the Yodha Task Force
- Tanuj Virwani as Sameer Khan
- Sunny Hinduja as Jalal, Lashkar-e-Taiba terrorist
- Kritika Bhardwaj as Tanya Sharma
- S. M. Zaheer as Anuj Nair
- Chittaranjan Tripathy as S N Dhingra
- Farida Patel Venkat as Mrs. Katyal, Arun's mother
- Mikhail Yawalkar as Ahmed Khalid
- Sanjay Gurbaxani as Indian Head of State (Note: Meant to depict the prime minister of India.)

== Production ==
The film is inspired by various aircraft hijackings in Indian history, particularly Indian Airlines Flight 814 in 1999. Principal photography began on 27 November 2021 and would go on to include shootings in Delhi, Bhopal, Manali, Pune and Ladakh. On 18 December 2021, Raashii Khanna and Disha Patani were announced as the leading actresses. In December 2021, Patani wrapped up her portion of the shoot and wrote a rap song for Badshah. In March 2022, Raashii Khanna wrapped up her portions. Later, Tanuj Virwani was cast in a prominent role.

== Soundtrack ==
Yodha

Soundtrack album by Tanishk Bagchi, Vishal Mishra, B Praak, Aditya Dev and John Stewart Eduri
- Released: 15 March 2024
- Genre: Feature film soundtrack
- Length: 20:49
- Language: Hindi
- Label: T-Series

Official audio
- Yodha (Full Album) on YouTube

The music of the film is composed by Tanishk Bagchi, Vishal Mishra, B Praak, Aditya Dev and John Stewart Eduri while lyrics are written by Manoj Muntashir, Jaani, Kunaal Vermaa, Vishal Mishra and Kaushal Kishore. The first single titled "Zindagi Tere Naam" was released on 24 February 2024. The second single titled "Tere Sang Ishq Hua" was released on 7 March 2024.

Track listing
| No. | Title | Lyrics | Music | Singer(s) | Length |
|---|---|---|---|---|---|
| 1. | "Zindagi Tere Naam" | Kaushal Kishore, Vishal Mishra | Vishal Mishra | Vishal Mishra | 3:28 |
| 2. | "Qismat Badal Di" | Jaani | B Praak, Aditya Dev | Ammy Virk, B Praak | 5:09 |
| 3. | "Tere Sang Ishq Hua" | Kunaal Vermaa | Tanishk Bagchi | Arijit Singh, Neeti Mohan | 3:38 |
| 4. | "Tiranga" | Manoj Muntashir | Tanishk Bagchi | B Praak | 4:22 |
| 5. | "Zindagi Tere Naam" (Soul Version) | Kaushal Kishore, Vishal Mishra | Vishal Mishra | Vishal Mishra | 3:00 |
| 6. | "Yodha Theme" | - | John Stewart Eduri | - | 1:12 |
| Total length: | | | | | 20:49 |

== Release ==
=== Theatrical ===
The film was scheduled to be released on 7 July 2023. The film was then postponed to 8 December 2023 and finally released on 15 March 2024.

=== Home media ===
The film was premiered on Amazon Prime Video from 10 May 2024.

== Reception ==
Yodha received mixed reviews from critics. On the review aggregator website Rotten Tomatoes, 58% of 12 critics' reviews are positive, with an average rating of 4.8/10.

Bollywood Hungama critic gave 3 out of 5 stars and wrote "Yodha is not the usual hijack film and features a fine performance; however, it is quite technical and confusing." NDTV's Saibal Chatterjee rated the film 1.5/5 and wrote "No matter how lenient you might want to be and how much of a Sidharth Malhotra fan you are, this pulpy action movie is a bumpy ride that lurches from one misstep to another."

Sukanya Verma of Rediff.com gave 2.5/5 stars and observed "A light-footed Sidharth single-handedly going at the baddies is a slick sight. Armed in swag, sunglasses and slow motion, the man is more than fit for the job. And it's on his charm and rugged shoulders that Yodha shamelessly rests".

Anupama Chopra, in her review for Film Companion said that "Yodha is a cheesy, chest-thumping, low-on-logic thriller that rides brazenly to a crowd-pleasing finale, mostly on the shoulders of a solid Sidharth Malhotra." Rishil Jogani of Pinkvilla rated the film 2.5/5 and opined that "Yodha has redeemable qualities and offers thrills too but the film in totality is a tiresome watch, full of clichés, cheesy dialogues and overused tropes."

== Other media ==
The marketing of the film included a tie-in comic by Pratilipi Comics, Adventures of Yodha: The Case of the Missing Ship, written by Akash Pathak and illustrated by Ayantika Roy.
