= Sunny Sanskari Ki Tulsi Kumari =

2025 Indian film by Shashank Khaitan

- Theatrical release poster
- Directed by: Shashank Khaitan
- Written by: Shashank Khaitan; Ishita Moitra
- Produced by: Hiroo Yash Johar; Karan Johar; Apoorva Mehta; Adar Poonawalla; Shashank Khaitan
- Starring: Varun Dhawan; Janhvi Kapoor; Sanya Malhotra; Rohit Saraf
- Cinematography: Manush Nandan
- Edited by: Manan Sagar; Charu Shree Roy
- Music by: Score: John Stewart Eduri; Songs: Tanishk Bagchi; A.P.S; Sachet–Parampara; Guru Randhawa; Rony Ajnali; Gill Machhrai
- Production companies: Dharma Productions; Mentor Disciple Entertainment
- Distributed by: Dharma Productions
- Release date: 2 October 2025
- Running time: 135 minutes
- Country: India
- Language: Hindi
- Budget: ₹80 crore
- Box office: est. ₹99.39 crore

Sunny Sanskari Ki Tulsi Kumari (transl. Sunny Sanskari's Tulsi Kumari) is a 2025 Indian Hindi-language romantic comedy film written and directed by Shashank Khaitan and produced by Dharma Productions and Mentor Disciple Entertainment. It stars an ensemble cast of Varun Dhawan, Janhvi Kapoor, Sanya Malhotra and Rohit Saraf in lead roles, alongside Maniesh Paul and Akshay Oberoi in supporting roles.

The film was theatrically released on 2 October 2025 coinciding with Dussehra.

== Plot ==
Sunny Sanskari, the son of a jewellery business owner, is all set to propose to his girlfriend, Ananya Bhatia, who is studying in Italy. Confident she will say yes, he even dresses up as Baahubali, her favorite character. However, things do not go as planned and Ananya turns him down, explaining that what they had was never a real relationship, just a "situationship"; making matters worse, she reveals she is already engaged to Vikram Singh, the man her mother has chosen for her.

Heartbroken, Sunny starts digging into Vikram's life and discovers that he is a billionaire who recently broke up with his childhood sweetheart, Tulsi Kumari, a schoolteacher. Vikram's elder brother Param and mother never approved of Tulsi due to her middle-class status and divorced parents. Although Tulsi deeply loved Vikram, she was dumped by him due to family pressure.

When Sunny learns this, he decides to meet Tulsi. Seeing her pain, he encourages her to fight for her love. After some hesitation, Tulsi agrees, and the two head to Udaipur where Vikram and Ananya's wedding is to be held. At the wedding, Sunny and Tulsi pretend to be a couple to get back at their exes, sparking jealousy and confusion while stirring up buried emotions. Ananya starts feeling guilty about leaving Sunny, while Vikram begins to realise what Tulsi truly means to him. Vikram's family still mocks Tulsi but Sunny supports her, earning Tulsi's praise.

Amidst the wedding chaos, Vikram suffers an allergic reaction, and it is Tulsi who rushes to his aid, showing she still cares. That night, Ananya has a fight with her mother about how she was always expected to marry and not pursue her true passions. Vikram, who realizes he still loves Tulsi, leaves his hotel room, where he runs into Ananya and the two agree to call off the wedding. Vikram tells his family and his elder brother slaps him, but he does not care and runs. Ananya finds Sunny and confesses, but Sunny confesses his feelings for Tulsi.

When Sunny finds Tulsi, he sees Vikram propose to her and Tulsi taking the ring, which leads to a heartbroken Sunny lying to Tulsi about him and Ananya getting back together, after which Tulsi and Vikram embrace. He runs into a crying Ananya and the two act as if they love each other and are leaving Udaipur. Sunny confronts Vikram's brother and mother for constantly mistreating Tulsi. The next morning, Tulsi chases Sunny down while he is leaving with Ananya on what was supposed to be the wedding day and the two hug, agreeing to remain friends.

One month later, Sunny goes to visit Tulsi but sees her hugging Vikram, who is holding a wedding card. Sunny mourns for what could have been with Tulsi, spending his days moping, yearning for her and spending time with his family at their jewellery business. Ananya attends a friend's wedding function and some of the staff mention doing a mehendi function yesterday at a Vikram Singh's farmhouse, seemingly confirming that he and Tulsi are getting married today. She rushes to tell Sunny, encouraging him to follow his love.

Sunny dashes to the wedding venue, where Vikram finds him and the two fight, with Vikram finally confronting Sunny for trying to ruin both of his weddings. They are found by Vikram's family and his bride, Dimple (Prajakta Koli). She now believes Sunny is in love with Vikram and slaps him, but he clears up the misunderstanding. Vikram explains to Sunny that in the one month that Tulsi left him, he fell in love with Dimple. Vikram reveals that after Sunny left during the proposal, Tulsi rejected him, stating that she was in love with Sunny and that he showed her that she deserved someone who always defended her, not someone who dumped her due to his family. The two agreed to remain friends and Tulsi was heartbroken after misunderstanding that Ananya and Sunny had reunited. Tulsi had hugged him after Vikram told her that he was going to marry Dimple.

Encouraged by Vikram, Dimple, and Vikram's family, Sunny goes to the school Tulsi's working at, where the two kiss. The school is holding a function and when the principal confronts them for kissing in front of the children, comedy ensues. When Tulsi angrily whispers to Sunny that she is actually going to lose her job, he decides to go all out and carries her out of the field, kissing her cheek.

== Cast ==
- Varun Dhawan as Sunny Sanskari
- Janhvi Kapoor as Tulsi Kumari
- Sanya Malhotra as Ananya Bhatia
- Rohit Saraf as Vikram Singh
- Prajakta Koli as Dimple (Special appearance)
- Maniesh Paul as Kuku, wedding planner
- Akshay Oberoi as Param Singh, Vikram's elder brother
- Abhinav Sharma as Bantu, Sunny's best friend
- Manini Chadha as Rakhi Singh, Param's wife
- Mallika Chhabra as Nisha, Vikram and Param's cousin and Bantu and Kuku's love interest
- Nazneen Madan as Kriti Bhatia, Ananya's mother
- Gaurav Sikri as Pulkit Bhatia, Ananya's father
- Monika Kohli as Mrs. Singh, Param and Vikram's mother, Rakhi and Dimple's mother-in-law
- Kavita Pais as Geeta Sanskari, Sunny's mother
- Rohitashv Gour as Suresh Sanskari, Sunny's father
- Dharna Durga as Dharna, Tulsi's best friend and colleague
- Salim Arif as Mr. Diwan
- Karan Johar in a guest appearance as himself

== Production ==
Principal photography commenced in May 2024. Filming was wrapped in August 2025.

== Soundtrack ==
Sunny Sanskari Ki Tulsi Kumari

Soundtrack album by Tanishk Bagchi, A.P.S, Sachet–Parampara, Guru Randhawa, Rony Ajnali and Gill Machhrai
- Released: 30 September 2025
- Genre: Feature film soundtrack
- Length: 22:14
- Language: Hindi
- Label: Sony Music India
- Producer: Meghdeep Bose
External audio
- Official Audio Jukebox on YouTube

The film's soundtrack is composed by Tanishk Bagchi, A.P.S, Sachet–Parampara, Guru Randhawa, Rony Ajnali and Gill Machhrai, with lyrics written by Manoj Muntashir, Kausar Munir, Jairaj, Tanishk Bagchi, Sonu Nigam, Guru Randhawa, Rony Ajnali and Gill Machhrai.

The first song "Bijuria" was a remake of the song from the 1999 album Mausam by Ravi Pawar with lyrics by Sonu Nigam and Ajay Jhingran. The second single titled "Panwadi" produced by Meghdeep Bose was released on 10 September 2025. The third single titled "Perfect" was released on 18 September 2025. The fourth single titled "Tu Hai Meri" was released on 23 September 2025.

Track listing
No.	Title	Lyrics	Music	Singer(s)	Length
1.	"Bijuria"	Sonu Nigam, Tanishk Bagchi	Tanishk Bagchi	Sonu Nigam, Asees Kaur	3:19
2.	"Panwadi"	Jairaj	A.P.S	Khesari Lal Yadav, Masoom Sharma, Dev Negi, Pritam, Nikhita Gandhi, Akasa Singh	4:01
3.	"Tu Hai Meri"	Kausar Munir	Sachet–Parampara	Sachet Tandon, Parampara Tandon	4:00
4.	"Perfect"	Guru Randhawa, Rony Ajnali, Gill Machhrai	Guru Randhawa, Rony Ajnali, Gill Machhrai	Guru Randhawa	2:26
5.	"Tumse Behtar"	Manoj Muntashir	Tanishk Bagchi	Arijit Singh	4:28
6.	"Ishq Manzoor"	Jairaj	A.P.S	Amit Mishra, Nakash Aziz, Shreya Ghoshal, Antara Mitra	3:23
7.	"Sunny Sunny Boy"	–	Tanishk Bagchi	Tanishk Bagchi	0:37
Total length:					22:14

== Marketing ==
The official teaser of the film was released on 29 August 2025, followed by the official trailer on 15 September 2025.

== Release ==
=== Theatrical ===
Initially, the film was supposed to release on 18 April 2025, but delays due to extensive production shifted the release date to 12 September of the same year. For a better chance of increased cinema attendance, the release date was pushed to 2 October 2025, coinciding with Dussehra, and clashing with the Rishab Shetty-directed Kantara: Chapter 1.

=== Home media ===
The film began streaming on Netflix from 27 November 2025.

== Reception ==
Sunny Sanskari Ki Tulsi Kumari received mixed reviews from critics. On the review aggregator website Rotten Tomatoes, 20% of 15 critics' reviews are positive, with an average rating of 5.1/10.

Yatamanyu Narain of News18 rated the film 3.5 stars out of 5 and wrote, "The film leaves you with laughter in your chest, warmth in your heart, and the faint aftertaste of nostalgia. It is cinema that does not shy away from its filminess, and perhaps that is its greatest gift, an unabashed celebration of love, heartbreak, and the chaos in between." Ganesh Aaglave of Firstpost rated the film 3.5 stars out of 5 and wrote, "On the whole, Sunny Sanskari Ki Tulsi Kumari is a fun entertainer filled with humour, heart and romance."

Bollywood Hungama rated the film 3.5 stars out of 5 and wrote, "On the whole, SUNNY SANSKARI KI TULSI KUMARI is a fun-filled entertainer aimed at the youth and families." Dhaval Roy of The Times Of India rated the film 3 stars out of 5 and wrote, "At its core, Sunny Sanskari Ki Tulsi Kumari delivers what it promises: a glitzy, colourful rom-com packed with humour, charm, and entertaining performances."

Tushar Joshi of India Today rated the film 3 stars out of 5 and wrote, "Shashank Khaitan's USP has always been witty dialogues, light humour, and true-blue romance. With 'Sunny Sanskari...', he revisits his comfort zone while attempting to experiment. At times, he soars; at others, he stumbles. The result is a film that entertains, charms, and frustrates—sometimes all at once." Rishabh Suri of Hindustan Times rated the film 2.5 stars out of 5 and wrote, "Overall, what Sunny Sanskari Ki Tulsi Kumari suffers from is not a lack of ambition but a lack of clarity. It wants to be a romance and a family drama all at once, yet it never commits fully to any of these tracks. For a story about fighting for love, SSKTK doesn't make you fall in love with it."

Saibal Chatterjee of NDTV rated the film 2.5 stars out of 5 and wrote, "The title gives away the ending of the film. How Sunny and Tulsi make their way into each other's orbit and heart adds up to a winding, perplexing and eventually comforting love story that would have been a whole lot more enjoyable, and infinitely funnier, had it shed some of its flab." Shubhra Gupta of The Indian Express rated the film 2 stars out of 5 and wrote, "In too many places, the spectacle is allowed to overpower the screenplay, which is too busy whipping up hit-film-referencing dialogues and situations to bother about creating real feeling."
