= Riya Vij =

Indian actress (born 1998)

- Born: Riya Vijeta; 14 December 1998 (age 27); Delhi, India
- Occupations: Actress, Student
- Years active: 2013-2016, 2025

Riya Vij is an Indian actress. She made her debut in Karan Johar's 2013 children's feature movie Gippi.

== Early life ==
Vij was born on 14 December 1998 in Delhi, India to a Punjabi family. She completed her schooling at Sanskriti School and is currently pursuing her graduation from Shaheed Sukhdev College of Business Studies.

== Filmography ==
Year	Film	Role	Language	Notes
2013	Gippi	Gurpreet Kaur (Gippi)	Hindi	
2014	Kick	Bubbles	Hindi	
2016	Kapoor and Sons	Tia's Friend	Hindi	
2025	Sunny Sanskari Ki Tulsi Kumari	Guest in the wedding	Hindi	Comeback Film/Uncredited role
