= The Tribe (2024 TV series) =

2024 Indian reality television series

- Genre: Reality television
- Written by: Aneesha Baig
- Directed by: Omkar Potdar
- Starring: See below
- Country of origin: India
- Original language: Hindi

Production
- Producers: Karan Johar; Apoorva Mehta; Aneesha Baig
- Production locations: Los Angeles, USA
- Camera setup: Multiple-camera
- Running time: 34-41 mins
- Production company: Dharmatic Entertainment

Original release
- Network: Amazon Prime Video
- Release: 4 October 2024

The Tribe is an Indian reality television series directed by Omkar Potdar and written by Aneesha Baig. Produced under Dharmatic Entertainment, starring Alanna Panday, Alaviaa Jaaferi, Srushti Porey, Aryaana Gandhi, Alfia Jafry and Hardik Zaveri. It premiered on Amazon Prime Video on 4 October 2024.

== Cast ==
- Alanna Panday
- Alaviaa Jaaferi
- Alfia Jafry
- Aryaana Gandhi
- Hardik Zaveri
- Srushti Porey
- Ivor McCray
- Rakhi Sawant

== Production ==
On 19 March 2024, the series was announced by Amazon Prime Video. The filming took place in Los Angeles, California in 2023.

== Release ==
The trailer for the series was released on 26 September 2024. The series was released on Amazon Prime Video on 4 October 2024.

== Reception ==
Neha Sen of Deccan Herald gave the series 2/5 stars. Shristi Sahoo of Rediff rated the series 3 out of 5 stars.
