= Good Newwz =

2019 Indian film by Raj Mehta

- Theatrical release poster
- Directed by: Raj Mehta
- Written by: Screenplay: Jyoti Kapoor; Dialogues: Jyoti Kapoor; Rishabh Sharma; Raj Mehta
- Story by: Jyoti Kapoor
- Produced by: Hiroo Yash Johar; Aruna Bhatia; Karan Johar; Apoorva Mehta; Shashank Khaitan
- Starring: Akshay Kumar; Kareena Kapoor Khan; Diljit Dosanjh; Kiara Advani
- Cinematography: Vishnu Rao
- Edited by: Manish More
- Music by: Songs: See Soundtrack; Score: John Stewart Eduri
- Production companies: Zee Studios; Dharma Productions; Cape of Good Films
- Distributed by: Zee Studios
- Release date: 27 December 2019
- Running time: 132 minutes
- Country: India
- Language: Hindi
- Budget: ₹70 crore
- Box office: ₹318.57 crore

Good Newwz is a 2019 Indian comedy film directed by Raj Mehta in his directorial debut and produced by Zee Studios, Dharma Productions and Cape of Good Films. It stars Akshay Kumar, Kareena Kapoor Khan, Diljit Dosanjh and Kiara Advani and revolves around two couples' tryst with in vitro fertilization.

Principal photography commenced in November 2018 and wrapped up by April 2019.

The film was released theatrically on 27 December 2019 coinciding New Year Festivities and became one of the highest grossing Indian films of 2019, with a final worldwide gross of ₹3.18 billion (US$45.16 million); it is Kumar's highest-grossing film in India. With this film, Kumar set a new record in 2019 by having three consecutive domestic 200 Crore Club net films alongside Mission Mangal and Housefull 4.

== Plot ==
Varun Batra is the CEO of a Volkswagen showroom in Mumbai and his wife, Deepti "Deepu" Batra, is a celebrity journalist. The two are a happily married couple going on seven years, but struggle to conceive a baby. Varun's sister Richa suggests the couple meet reputed fertility specialist Dr. Anand Joshi, who suggests they do in vitro fertilisation (IVF), a fertility technique that will enhance their chances. They agree, Varun submits sperm samples, and Dr. Joshi seemingly places the couple's embryo created in his lab in Deepti's uterus.

12 days later, Varun and Deepti are hastily summoned by Dr. Anand's wife, Dr. Sandhya Joshi, where the two run into another couple: Honey Batra and Monika "Moni" Batra, who have elected IVF as well. Anand guiltily reveals that a sperm mix-up has occurred due to the two couples homonymous surname: Varun's sperm have been fertilised Monika's eggs, and Honey's sperm with Deepti's eggs. Shocked beyond belief, both couples attack the two doctors. The doctors suggest that the couples go for a minor procedure so there is no chance of pregnancy. Varun later learns from Honey that Monika is pregnant with Varun's child, and Deepti is pregnant with Honey's child, but his rudeness causes Honey to fear the loss of his own child. He vows to prevent an abortion on Deepti's part, and he and Monika rent out a flat just above Varun's and Deepti's, much to the couple's shock.

Varun and Deepti initially project frustration against Honey and Monika during the first six months of pregnancy for interfering in their lives. However, during a routine check-up in the seventh month of pregnancy, Sandhya advises Deepti to try talking to Monika, who is probably going through as much as she is, being emotionally distressed. Realising that she needs to try to understand the situation, Deepti asks Monika out for a street food treat, during which they start getting to know each other. Deepti learns that Monika had suffered two miscarriages, making her sympathise, and the women bond. However, Varun still nurses a negative attitude, especially since Deepti is not carrying his child. She takes a stand in Honey's and Monika's favour for the first time, angrily telling Varun that he never cared to understand anything that happened post the mishap.

Varun, with Deepti's confrontation still fresh in his mind, makes an attempt to bond with Honey when they meet at a bar, and they almost strike a chord with each other, until Honey expresses concern over Deepti's work commitments, which he thinks will have a negative impact on the child. Varun, incensed, snubs Honey in a possessive manner, an argument between the two escalates until Varun storms out and Honey is arrested after the manager drops a call.

That night, amidst heavy rains, Monika knocks on Deepti's door in desperation: she has gone into premature labour and Honey is nowhere to be found. Varun hurriedly drives Monika to the hospital and she gives birth to Varun's child. However, the newborn is shifted to a critical unit in grave condition, having been born with a respiratory defect, accelerated by Monika's history of miscarriages, with little chance of survival. As it dawns on him that the baby is in fact his, Varun begins crying and hugs Honey when he arrives after being let off with a warning. Even as Honey and Monika reunite, he goes home and breaks down in Deepti's arms, apologising for his past insensitivity.

For a few weeks, both couples pray for the baby's recovery and Monika remains in the hospital as Deepti tends to her. The baby finally recovers and after 2 months, Deepti too has a successful delivery. Varun, now a changed man, invites Honey and Monika to meet the baby. Both couples finally bond and accept each other, holding each other's babies in their arms.

== Cast ==
- Akshay Kumar as Varun Batra
- Kareena Kapoor Khan as Deepti "Deepu" Batra
- Diljit Dosanjh as Honey Batra
- Kiara Advani as Monika "Moni" Batra
- Tisca Chopra as Dr. Sandhya Joshi
- Adil Hussain as Dr. Anand Joshi
- Anjana Sukhani as Advocate Richa Ahuja
- Faisal Rashid as Vivek Ahuja
- Sunita Dhir as Manjot Batra
- Amishka Sood as the IVF Hospital Receptionist
- Kaartic Krishna Kumar as patient at IVF centre
- Richa Kapoor as Reeta Batra
- Pradeep Kuckreja as Rajan Batra
- Kavita Pais as Kamini Kashya
- Shivam Pal as the Airport cab driver
- Karan Ashar as Akash Singhania, Varun's friend
- Taksh Dave as Tarun Batra, Varun's Showroom kid
- Vishwa Sharma as the Old IVF Patient
- Uddhav Dharap as Patient at IVF Centre

=== Special appearances ===
- Karan Johar in the song "Chandigarh Mein"
- Badshah in the song "Chandigarh Mein"
- Harrdy Sandhu in the song "Chandigarh Mein"
- Sukhbir in the song "Sauda Khara Khara"
- Mohit Raina as Murari, flight passenger

== Production ==
=== Pre-production ===
This film's name was announced on Twitter. It is Dosanjh's first film under the banner of Dharma Productions.

=== Filming ===
Filming commenced in December 2018, with Dosanjh and Advani filming their scenes. Kumar and Kapoor joined filming in January and announced it by posting on Instagram. During a recent interview and in a Twitter post, Kumar said about Kapoor, "We are extremely fond of each other. Bebo and Lolo tease me about the amount of money I’m making and I tease them about having a flat in every building in Bandra. That's our fun banter." Anjana Sukhani joined the cast, and she was revealed to be Kumar's sister. The filming was finished in the first week of April 2019.

== Release ==
The film was slated to release on 6 September but was pushed to 29 November, and pushed again to release on 25 December 2019, on the festival of Christmas.

== Soundtrack ==
Good Newwz

Soundtrack album by Tanishk Bagchi, Rochak Kohli, Lauv, Lijo George – DJ Chetas, Manj Musik – Herbie Sahara, Sukhbir and Kshmr
- Released: 26 December 2019
- Recorded: 2019
- Genre: Feature film soundtrack
- Length: 27:55
- Language: Hindi
- Label: Zee Music Company
External audio
- Official Audio Jukebox on YouTube

The film's music is composed by Tanishk Bagchi, Rochak Kohli, Lauv, Lijo George (DJ Chetas), Manj Musik (Herbie Sahara), Sukhbir and Kshmr. The songs are written by Kumaar, Rashmi Virag, Tanishk Bagchi, Sukhbir, Gurpreet Saini, Ari Leff, Michael Pollock, Herbie Sahara and Vayu. The background score is composed by John Stewart Eduri.

The song "Sauda Khara Khara" is a remake of Sukhbir's song, recreated by Lijo George-DJ Chetas, while the song "Laal Ghagraa" is a remake of Sahara's and Musik's song, and has been recreated by Bagchi, who added an interlude from Daler Mehndi's song "Ho Jayegi Balle Balle" to the recreated version.

Track listing
No.	Title	Lyrics	Music	Singer(s)	Length
1.	"Chandigarh Mein"	Tanishk Bagchi, Badshah	Tanishk Bagchi	Badshah, Harrdy Sandhu, Lisa Mishra, Asees Kaur	3:25
2.	"Laal Ghaghra"	Tanishk Bagchi, Herbie Sahara	Tanishk Bagchi, Manj Musik–Herbie Sahara	Manj Musik, Herbie Sahara, Neha Kakkar	4:28
3.	"Zumba"	Vayu	Tanishk Bagchi	Romy	2:57
4.	"Maana Dil"	Rashmi Virag	Tanishk Bagchi	B Praak	3:55
5.	"Sauda Khara Khara"	Kumaar	Lijo George – DJ Chetas, Sukhbir	Diljit Dosanjh, Sukhbir, Dhvani Bhanushali	3:31
6.	"Dil Na Jaaneya"	Gurpreet Saini, Ari Leff, Michael Pollock	Rochak Kohli, Lauv	Rochak Kohli, Lauv, Akasa Singh	3:51
7.	"Dil Na Jaaneya" (Unplugged)	Gurpreet Saini	Rochak Kohli	Arijit Singh	3:03
8.	"Good Newwz (Theme)"	–	KSHMR, Tanishk Bagchi	–	2:45
Total length:					27:55

== Reception ==
On the review aggregator website Rotten Tomatoes, 71% of 17 critics' reviews are positive, with an average rating of 6.10/10.

Taran Adarsh gave the film 4 out of 5 stars and said, "Excellent. This one's a sure-fire hit. Smart writing. Fantastic humour. Heartfelt emotions... Superb performances [Akshay, Kareena, Diljit, Kiara]. 2019 will conclude with a big winner, with [Good Newwz]." Rajeev Masand of News 18 gave the film 3 out of 5 stars and said, "If Good Newwz doesn't go off the rails when the tone shifts, it's because the actors stay sincere and committed as the narrative evolves. The heart of the film is its cast anyway."

== Box office ==
Good Newwz earned ₹17.56 crore at the domestic box office on its opening day. On the second day, the film earned ₹21.78 crore. On the third day, the film earned ₹25.65 crore, for a total opening weekend earning of ₹65.99 crore.

As of 21 February 2020, with a gross of ₹244.21 crore in India and ₹74.36 crore overseas, the film has a worldwide gross collection of ₹318.57 crore and is the sixth highest grossing Bollywood film of 2019.

== Home media ==
The film was made available to stream on OTT platform Amazon Prime on 22 February 2020.

== Sequel ==
A spiritual sequel, Bad Newz, was theatrically released on 19 July 2024. It stars Vicky Kaushal, Triptii Dimri, and Ammy Virk and deals with heteropaternal superfecundation.
