= Cyrus S. Poonawalla =

Indian billionaire businessman (born 1941)

Cyrus Poonawalla
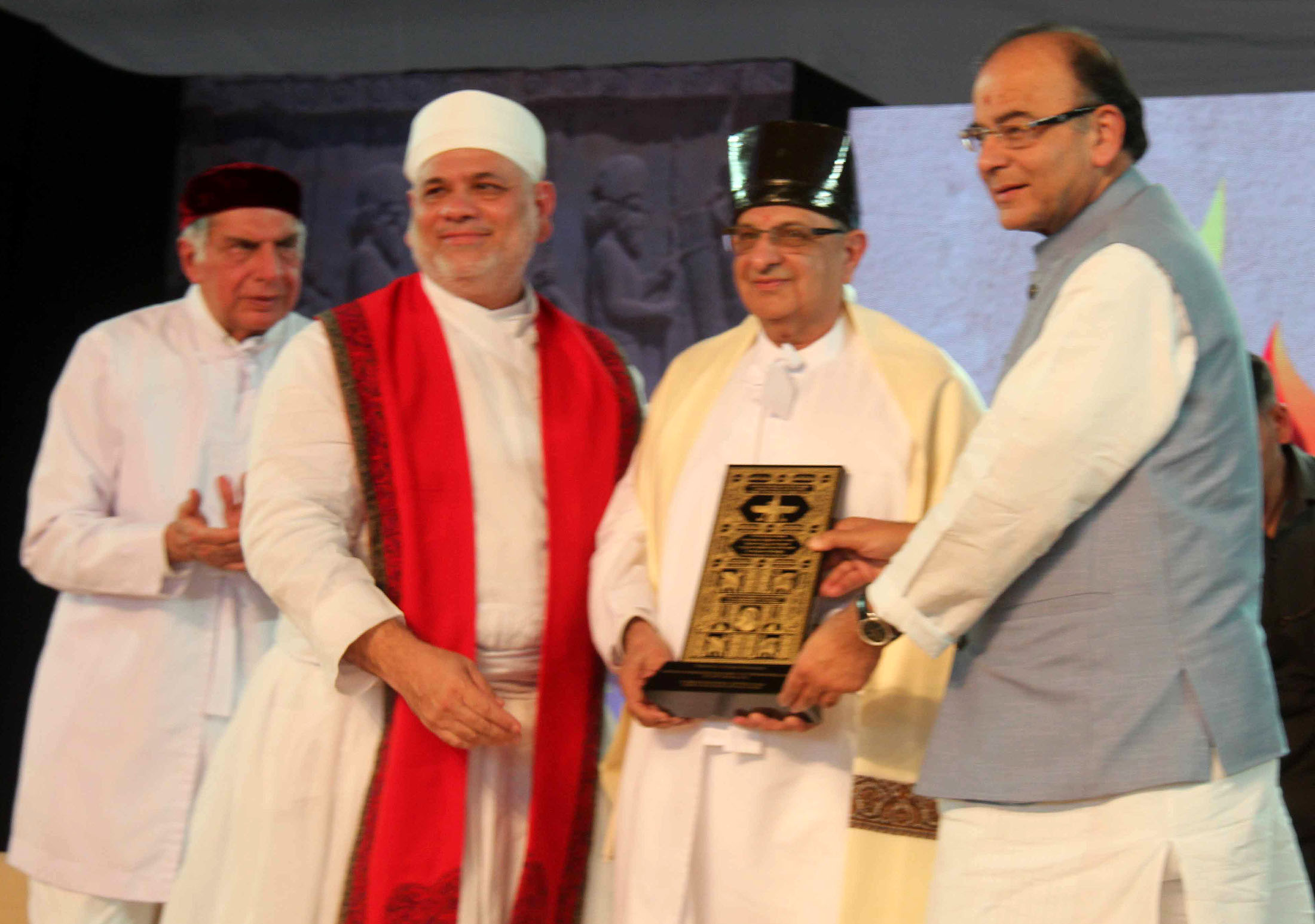
- Poonawalla in 2015 (2nd from right)
- Born: Cyrus Soli Poonawalla; 11 May 1941 (age 85)
- Education: Brihan Maharashtra College of Commerce
- Occupations: Businessman, owner of Bilthoven Biologicals, Serum Institute of India, Poonawalla Fincorp
- Years active: 1966–present
- Known for: Founder of Serum Institute of India and owner of Poonawalla Group of Companies
- Spouse: Villoo Poonawalla (died 2010)
- Children: Adar Poonawalla
- Awards: Padma Shri (2005), Padma Bhushan (2022)
- Website: cyruspoonawalla.com

Cyrus Soli Poonawalla (born 11 May 1941) is an Indian billionaire businessman, and the chairman and managing director of the Cyrus Poonawalla Group, which includes the Serum Institute of India, an Indian biotech company which is the largest vaccine manufacturer in the world, and Poonawalla Fincorp, a leading NBFC in India. In 2022, he was ranked as the 4th richest person in India on Forbes India rich list with a net worth of $24.3 billion. He was ranked number 1 on the Hurun Global Healthcare Rich List 2022.

In October 2024, Poonawalla and his family were ranked ninth on Forbes list of India’s 100 richest tycoons, with a net worth of $22.1 billion.

== Early life and career ==
Cyrus Soli Poonawalla was born in a Pune based Parsi family; to parents Soli and Gool Poonawalla. His father Soli Poonawalla was a horse breeder.

Poonawalla founded the Serum Institute of India in 1966 and built it into the world's largest vaccine manufacturer (by volume) and supplier to over 140 countries. Serum Institute produces over 1.5 billion doses annually of a range of vaccines, including for measles, polio, and the flu.

== Personal life ==
Poonawalla was married to Villoo Poonawalla, who died in 2010. Together they have a son, Adar, who currently works as the CEO of Serum Institute of India. He has two grandchildren.

== Awards ==
- Padma Shri for his contribution to the field of medicine, by the Government of India in 2005.
- The Ernst & Young "Entrepreneur of the Year" in the category of Healthcare & Life Sciences in November 2007.
- The Ernst & Young Entrepreneur of the Year for India in February 2015.
- Honorary doctorate by the University of Massachusetts Medical School in June 2018.
- Honorary doctorate by the University of Oxford in June 2019.
- 'ICMR Lifetime Achievement Medal' for contribution in healthcare by Bill Gates in November 2019.
- Lokmanya Tilak National Award in August 2021.
- Dean's medal from the Johns Hopkins Bloomberg School of Public Health in May 2022.
- Padma Bhushan, for his contribution in production of vaccines during COVID-19, in the field of Trade and Industry, by the Government of India in 2022.

== Philanthropy ==
In 2011, Cyrus Poonawala started the Villoo Poonawalla Foundation, focussing on education, healthcare, and water & sanitation. In the healthcare space, the foundation has setup the Villoo Poonawalla Memorial Hospital, a tertiary care multispecialty hospital in Pune providing ethical and affordable medical services. The foundation has setup a number of schools, provided scholarships, improved school infrastructure, and delivered skill development programmes, with a particular focus on supporting underprivileged students.

In May 2019, it was reported that Poonawalla, in partnership with Naum Koen, had proposed supplying Ukraine with 100 thousand doses of the measles vaccine for free vaccination.
