= Taha Shah Badussha =

Indian actor (born 1987)

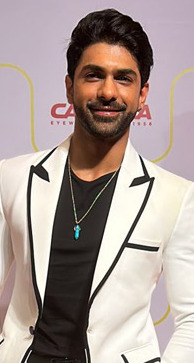
- Shah in 2023
- Born: Taha Shah Badussha; 19 November 1987 (age 38); Abu Dhabi, United Arab Emirates
- Citizenship: India
- Occupation: Actor
- Years active: 2011–present
- Website: tahashah.com

Taha Shah Badussha (born 19 November 1987) is an Indian actor who works in Hindi films. After making his debut with the romantic comedy Luv Ka The End (2011), he appeared in the comedy-drama Gippi (2013). In 2024, Shah earned recognition for his role in the Netflix period drama series Heeramandi.

== Early life and work ==
Taha Shah was born in Abu Dhabi, United Arab Emirates, to parents from India. His father Shah Sikkander Badusha is an orthopedic doctor, hails from Tamil Nadu, India. His mother Mahnaz Sikkander Badusha was a biochemist, hails from Karnataka, India. He has an elder brother, Abid, who is a Lead Civil engineer from the University of Toronto.

Taha's schooling spanned two countries beginning with the Sherwood Academy in Abu Dhabi and later at Kodaikanal International School, Kodaikanal, Tamil Nadu. He later completed his schooling at the International School of Choueifat and Sharjah American International School. Following this, Taha enrolled at the American University of Sharjah for to pursue a Business Administration program, but later dropped from the course. Since 2006, Taha involved himself in several businesses such as human resource management, construction, real estate, and supply of construction material. Shah concept of a steel import business was abandoned following recession, as it was reported to be a successful venture until economic downturn struck him.

== Acting career ==
He later made a trip to Toronto, Canada, to visit his brother for New Year's Eve in 2009, where he finalised acting as his career. Then, he took admission to the New York Film Academy (NYFA) in Abu Dhabi. Taha had also learnt acting while studying in Abu Dhabi. After completing six months at NYFA, he was about to leave for Los Angeles to complete the remainder of his course, when his father thought that Taha should move to Mumbai first. His mother too agreed and two weeks later (in September 2009) Taha came to Mumbai for a two-day visit with his family and incidentally, they remained over there. In Mumbai he spent countless hours practicing dancing and martial arts.

Nine months later, Taha was signed for his debut film, Luv Ka The End by Y-Films. He was cast as an antihero, the first of its kind role in the youth genre. He was seen for a second time in the 2013 movie Gippi by Dharma Productions, which released on 10 May 2013. Taha received positive reviews for his performance, and Karan Johar said, "Taha has a strong screen presence that combines machismo and vulnerability. I am sure he will have a great innings at the movies." Ramesh S. Taurani noted, "With two back-to-back good performances, Taha has the potential to be someone who is here to stay. Right choices of films will ensure a strong foothold for him in the industry. I wish him best of luck and loads of success." Rensil D'Silva wrote, "Taha has the right mix of vulnerability and intensity to straddle many genres — be it a romcom, an intense drama or a thriller. And to top it all, he's a good actor. That's an enviable mix." Nikhil Advani described, "Taha is one of the few new talents showing that acting is about versatility. With his second film Gippi, he's chosen the right path."

In 2015, he acted in Mahesh Bhatt's Barkhaa opposite Pakistani actress Sara Loren. The movie was declared a commercial disaster but its songs was memorable including "Khuda Bhi Na Dikhe" and "Tu Itni Khoobsurat Hai". In 2016, he appeared in Karan Johar's Baar Baar Dekho alongside Sidharth Malhotra and Katrina Kaif, playing the role of Tarun. The film became a failure at the box office. In 2017, Shah acted in Ranchi Diaries playing Pinku. In 2020, he made his Hollywood debut with Draupadi Unleashed playing Gautam. In January 2021, he acted in the web series Bullets (which was previously titled Tina and Lolo) playing Mario opposite Karishma Tanna. In March 2021, he acted in Ekta Kapoor and ALT Balaji's Bekaboo 2 playing Novin opposite Priya Banerjee.

Shah debuted as a singer when he released his 2022 single "Vande Mataram". Shah played the role of Tajdar in Sanjay Leela Bhansali's Netflix series Heeramandi.

== Filmography ==
- All films are in Hindi, unless otherwise noted

Year	Title	Role	Notes
2011	Luv Ka The End	Luv Nanda	
2013	Gippi	Arjun	
2015	Barkhaa	Jatin Sabarwal	
2016	Baar Baar Dekho	Tarun Bhalla	
2017	Ranchi Diaries	Pinku	
2019	Draupadi Unleashed	Gautam	Hollywood film
2023	Kabzaa	Saartaj	Kannada film

=== Television ===
Year	Title	Role	Ref.
2021	Bullets	Mario	
2021	Bekaboo 2	Novin	
2021	Aisa Waisa Pyaar	Rajiv Acharya	
2023	Taj: Divided by Blood	Murad Mirza	
2024	Heeramandi	Tajdar Baloch	

== Awards and nominations ==
Year	Award	Category	Work	Result	Ref.
2024	Filmfare OTT Awards	Best Actor in a Series (Male): Drama	Heeramandi	Nominated	
