= Bhoot – Part One: The Haunted Ship =

2020 Indian film by Bhanu Pratap Singh

- Theatrical release poster
- Directed by: Bhanu Pratap Singh
- Written by: Bhanu Pratap Singh
- Produced by: Hiroo Yash Johar; Karan Johar; Apoorva Mehta; Shashank Khaitan
- Starring: Vicky Kaushal; Bhumi Pednekar; Inayah Chowdhry
- Cinematography: Pushkar Singh
- Edited by: Bodhaditya Banerjee
- Music by: Score: Ketan Sodha; Songs: Akhil Sachdeva
- Production companies: Dharma Productions; Zee Studios
- Distributed by: Zee Studios
- Release date: 21 February 2020
- Running time: 114 minutes
- Country: India
- Language: Hindi
- Budget: ₹37 crore
- Box office: est. ₹40.94 crore

Bhoot – Part One: The Haunted Ship (transl. Ghost) is a 2020 Indian Hindi-language horror thriller film written and directed by Bhanu Pratap Singh and jointly produced by Karan Johar, Hiroo Yash Johar, Apoorva Mehta, and Shashank Khaitan. The film features Vicky Kaushal in the lead role and is the first film of what was a planned horror film franchise.

According to Singh, who was a former assistant director to Khaitan, and Johar, Bhoot : Part One - The Haunted Ship is based on a true incident that took place in Mumbai, the famous MV Wisdom in 2011 and tells the story of an officer who has to move an abandoned but haunted ship lying static on Juhu Beach. Principal photography began in December 2018 and was wrap in September 2019.

Set for an initial release on 15 November 2019, the film was postponed and released theatrically in India on 21 February 2020. It eventually received negative reviews and was a commercial failure.

== Plot ==
Meera's third birthday is celebrated on the Sea-Bird by the ship's merchant crew. Drawn away from the party by a noise, Meera is attacked by a ghost and screams. Years later, shipping officer Prithvi Maurya (Vicky Kaushal), with the help of his friend and colleague Riaz, elopes with his pregnant girlfriend Sapna. Prithvi foils a human trafficking operation, but Riaz warns him against such dangerous adventures. Sapna gives birth to their daughter, Megha, and they are shown raising her.

Some time later, Prithvi is living alone. He and Riaz investigate the Sea-Bird, which was mysteriously found abandoned at an unmanned port, and recover its logbook. A couple is shown on a romantic adventure on the ship before being killed by a ghost. The body of a girl is found buried on the beach. Prithvi and Riaz attempt to tow the Sea-Bird away for disposal, but their salvage ship is damaged. Prithvi is injured while saving a drowning man and sees a girl through a hole in the ship.

While recovering, Prithvi hallucinates the ship, as well as Sapna and Megha. In a flashback, it is revealed that they drowned because of improper safety equipment on a river-rafting holiday he had planned. Disturbed, he consults Professor Joshi (Ashutosh Rana), who is researching the afterlife and has hallucinations of his own dead wife and daughter. Prithvi returns to the ship and finds a video camera in the engine room; the ghost attacks him, but he is saved by Riaz.

Prithvi comes to believe that the girl he saw is Meera and that she has been possessed by the ghost for 11 years. He brings his findings to Joshi, who advises him to identify the ghost; Riaz is wary, realising this is well beyond their duty. Prithvi learns that the crew of the ship committed suicide, except for Meera and her mother, and grows suspicious of an unidentified man among the crew. Prithvi and Riaz meet the mother, Vandana (Meher Vij), and play the video of Meera's birthday party. Vandana reveals that the Sea-Bird was involved in drug smuggling and other illegal activities, and that the unknown man, Amar, stopped her from committing suicide after the captain had assaulted her. Vandana says that she and Amar fell in love and planned to flee, recording the captain's illegal activities to expose him, but Amar was then caught and died following torture.

In order to free Meera, Vandana agrees to show the shipping officers a secret room on the ship. Along with Joshi, they go to the ship the night before it is to be towed away. They fight the ghost, and during the encounter, it is revealed that Vandana killed Amar to save herself. Vandana and Joshi are killed, and Riaz spills diesel fuel. Prithvi finds the secret room, where Amar's corpse is hanging. He burns the body, dispelling the ghost. Prithvi rescues Meera, and they escape through the hole in the ship.

In the epilogue, Prithvi teaches Meera how to eat noodles. In a post-credits scene, a black figure is seen moving around Prithvi's home.

== Cast ==
- Vicky Kaushal as Prithvi Maurya
- Bhumi Pednekar as Sapna Prakashan
- Inayah Chowdhry as Meera
- Akash Dhar as Riaz
- Ashutosh Rana as Professor Raghuveer Joshi
- Meher Vij as Vandana
- Priya Chauhan as Nilofer

== Production ==
In January 2018, it was reported that Kaushal and Pednekar had signed a horror film produced by Karan Johar. Filming began in December 2018, with Kaushal, while Pednekar filmed her portions in late January 2019. Kaushal fractured his cheekbone while shooting for an action sequence in Gujarat. A door fell on him which resulted in him getting 13 stitches. The shooting of the film ended on 3 September 2019 according to a post on Kaushal's Instagram account.

== Release ==
The film was initially set for release on 15 November 2019, but this was delayed until 21 February 2020.

== Soundtrack ==
Bhoot – Part One: The Haunted Ship

Soundtrack album by Akhil Sachdeva
- Released: 12 February 2020
- Recorded: 2019
- Genre: Feature film soundtrack
- Length: 3:31
- Language: Hindi
- Label: Zee Music Company
External audio
- Channa Ve Song on YouTube

The film has only one song, composed and written by Akhil Sachdeva.

Track listing
No.	Title	Singer(s)	Length
1.	"Channa Ve"	Akhil Sachdeva, Mansheel Gujral	3:31

== Reception ==
=== Box office ===
Bhoot – Part One: The Haunted Ship earned ₹5.10 crore (51 million rupees) net at the domestic box office on its opening day. On the second day, the film collected ₹5.52 crore. On the third day, the film collected ₹5.74 crores taking the total opening weekend collection to ₹16.36 crores (163.6 million rupees).

The film grossed ₹38.06 crore in India and ₹2.88 crore overseas, for a worldwide gross collection of ₹40.94 crore (409.4 million rupees).

=== Critical reception ===
On the review aggregator website Rotten Tomatoes, 0% of 11 critics' reviews are positive, with an average rating of 4.3/10.

Namrata Joshi of The Hindu wrote that the film "floats along swimmingly and perches promisingly well at the interval till the curse of the second half gets to afflict it severely." Ronak Kotecha of The Times of India gave the film 2.5 stars out of 5 stating that the film "isn’t convincing enough to make your wait worth it. For a horror film, ‘Bhoot Part One the Haunted Ship’ falls short of sending chills down your spine. At best, it can give you a few spooks." Udita Jhunjhunwala of Firstpost also gave it 2.5 stars adding : "The parallels between Prithvi’s trauma and the tragedy onboard the Sea Bird are far from subtle and that is Bhoot’s greatest loss – it floats but does not find its emotional anchor in the deep and haunting impact of personal loss and regret."

Shalini Langer of gave it 1.5 stars out of 5 and stated that "Vicky Kaushal is the saving grace of this horror film." Writing in Hindustan Times, Monika Rawal Kukreja described the film as "The best you can say about Bhoot is that it is not outrageously funny as some of Ram Gopal Varma’s big-screen outings, but does unintentionally crack you up at many places." Vibha Maru of India Today gave it 1 star out of 5 and called it "mind-numbingly boring."
