= Barkhaa =

2015 film

- Directed by: Shadaab Mirza
- Written by: Shadaab Mirza
- Produced by: Shabana Hashmi
- Starring: Sara Loren; Taaha Shah; Priyanshu Chatterjee; Shweta Pandit
- Cinematography: Mujahid Raza
- Edited by: Mayuresh Sawant
- Production company: Zahara Productions
- Distributed by: Essel Vision Productions
- Release date: 27 March 2015
- Running time: 127 minutes
- Country: India
- Language: Hindi
- Box office: ₹13.3 million

Barkhaa is a 2015 Indian Hindi-language romantic film, directed by Shadaab Mirza and produced by Shabana Hashmi. It stars Sara Loren in the lead role. The film also stars Taaha Shah, Shweta Pandit, Priyanshu Chatterjee and Puneet Issar as supporting cast members. The film was extensively shot in Himachal Pradesh, India. The marketing of the film was done by Hash Entertainment and is produced under the banner of Zahara Productions. It was released on 27 March 2015.

== Plot ==
The film follows Jatin (Taaha Shah), a young law student who visits a hill station with his family. While exploring the town, he encounters a mysterious and beautiful woman named Barkhaa (Sara Loren). He is instantly drawn to her and starts pursuing her, but she keeps her distance.

Jatin soon learns that Barkhaa works as a bar dancer in a shady club. Despite this, he remains infatuated with her and tries to understand her past. Through a series of flashbacks, her tragic story is revealed.

Barkhaa was once a simple and innocent girl living in a village with her father (Puneet Issar), a retired army officer who had strict principles. One day, she met Akash (Priyanshu Chatterjee), a charming and wealthy businessman who showered her with love and promised to marry her. Barkhaa, believing in his love, gave herself completely to him. However, her world shattered when she got pregnant, and Akash abandoned her.

Her father, upon discovering the truth, was enraged and disowned her. Left with no family and no means of survival, Barkhaa ended up in a bar, where she was forced into a life of exploitation and heartbreak.

Back in the present, Jatin is heartbroken after learning about Barkhaa’s past but is still determined to be with her. He convinces her that she deserves love and respect, but Barkhaa, having been betrayed before, hesitates to trust him.

Things take a dramatic turn when it is revealed that Akash, the man who ruined Barkhaa’s life, is none other than Jatin’s elder brother. This shocking revelation creates a conflict between Jatin and his family.

Jatin, unwilling to abandon Barkhaa like his brother did, stands up against his family. However, Barkhaa, realizing that her presence might ruin Jatin’s life and family reputation, decides to leave him. She disappears without a trace, sacrificing her love for Jatin’s future.

The film ends on an emotional note, with Jatin heartbroken but respecting Barkhaa’s decision. It leaves the audience with the message of how societal norms and betrayals can destroy lives, but true love always remains selfless

== Cast ==
- Taaha Shah as Jatin Sabarwal
- Sara Loren as Barkhaa Sabarwal / Panchhi, Jatin's lover and Aakash's ex-wife
- Priyanshu Chatterjee as Aakash Sabarwal, Jatin's brother and Barkhaa's ex-husband
- Shweta Pandit as Madhu, Barkhaa's friend
- Puneet Issar as Advocate Sabarwal, Jatin and Aakash's father
- Ashiesh Roy as Mr. Shetty / Anna
- Sonam Sharma as Swati Sharma
- Raashul Tandon as Gullu

== Production ==
Shooting started in Himachal Pradesh in 2014. Other filming locations include Mumbai.

== Soundtrack ==
The music composed by Amjad-Nadeem while lyrics penned by Shadab Akhtar, Sameer. The album was named Best Hindi Album of March 2015 by Deccan Music. The Soundtrack for this Album was Released on 24 March 2015.

No.	Title	Lyrics	Singer(s)	Length
1.	"Naughty No.1"	Sameer	Neha Kakkar, Amjad Khan	4:02
2.	"Tu Itni Khoobsurat Hai"	Shadab Akhtar	Rahat Fateh Ali Khan, Dhruv Pankhania	4:11
3.	"Pehli Dafa"	Sameer	Sonu Nigam, Renuka Gaur	3:59
4.	"Lafze Bayaan"	Sameer	Mohammed Irfan, Shreya Ghoshal	4:54
5.	"Khuda Bhi Na Dikhe"	Shadab Akhtar	Krishna Beuraa	6:33
6.	"Mann Quanto Maula"	Shadab Akhtar	Aftaab Hashim Sabri, Altamash Faridi	5:08
7.	"Tu Itni Khoobsurat Hai" (Reloaded)	Shadab Akhtar	Jubin Nautiyal, Prakriti Kakar	3:58
8.	"Khuda Bhi Na Dikhe" (Remix)	Shadab Akhtar	Krishna Beuraa	5:04
Total length:				37:49

== Critical reception ==
Renuka Vyavahare of The Times of India wrote, "The film is a decent watch for those, who for some weird reason may crave for the 70’s melodrama. It boasts of an archaic story and a predictable plot, with the actors spouting done to death dialogues throughout. If you want to revisit that phase of Bollywood, where women were perpetually unhappy and had a ‘majboori’ for being that way, you can watch this one. Else, avoid." Indo-Asian News Service wrote, "Barkhaa rains down a rhapsody of drama and romance. A heart-warming at times, touching tale of an innocent girl's journey into the world of deceit, compromise and corruption, it echoes Raj Kapoor's Ram Teri Ganga Maili and Kamal Amrohi's Pakeezah in the way the respectable genteel upper class is shown to exploit women of meagre means."
