= Ajeeb Daastaans =

- Official release poster
- Directed by: Shashank Khaitan; Raj Mehta; Neeraj Ghaywan; Kayoze Irani
- Written by: Shashank Khaitan; Sumit Saxena; Neeraj Ghaywan; Uzma Khan
- Produced by: Karan Johar; Apoorva Mehta
- Cinematography: Pushkar Singh; Jishnu Bhattacharjee; Siddharth Diwan; Siddharth Vasani
- Edited by: Nitin Baid
- Music by: John Stewart Eduri; Alokananda Dasgupta; Shailendra Barve
- Production company: Dharmatic Entertainment
- Distributed by: Netflix
- Release date: 16 April 2021
- Running time: 142 minutes
- Country: India
- Language: Hindi

Ajeeb Daastaans (transl. Strange Stories) is a 2021 Hindi-language anthology film, consisting of four short film segments directed by Shashank Khaitan, Raj Mehta, Neeraj Ghaywan and Kayoze Irani. The film was produced by Karan Johar and Netflix.

At the 2021 Filmfare OTT Awards, Ajeeb Daastaans received 3 nominations, including Best Web Original Film and Best Actor in a Web Original Film (Manav Kaul), and won Best Actress in a Web Original Film (Konkona Sen Sharma).

== Plot ==
=== Majnu ===
Lipakshi is married to Babloo but is unhappy with their relationship, and seeks affection from other men. When Raj Kumar, the son of their driver, joins their household as an employee, Lipakshi becomes interested in him. Raj, a talented finance graduate, decides to work for Babloo instead of taking a job offer in London, and proves to be profitable for the business. He also shows romantic interest in Lipakshi, without Babloo's awareness. Babloo does not have affection towards Lipakshi, but he feels the need to protect his family's reputation and does not tolerate her extramarital affairs. Despite this, Lipakshi continues to pursue Raj and eventually, they engage in a romantic relationship when Babloo is absent. The affair between Raj and Lipakshi becomes passionate, and they even plan to elope after a night of intimacy. The very same night, Babloo receives pictures of Lipakshi with Gopal, his trusted aide. He calls for Raj, who is about to leave, and reveals that he has fallen in love with him and would want to be with him forever. He shows the pictures to Raj. Raj, a little taken aback, tells him to handle Gopal while he goes for Lipakshi. Raj gets on a bus, and we see Lipakshi leaving with her bags. While beating up Gopal, Babloo sees a video of Raj kissing Lipakshi and is stunned. In the same video, Raj reveals that Gopal is innocent, and it was him who was Lipakshi's lover all along. He reveals that ever since Babloo broke his father's leg for crashing a car into a planter, all Raj wanted was revenge. So he stole a lump sum of 10 crores from Babloo while he worked for him and left the country along with his parents. After the reveal, Lipakshi is waiting at the railway station for Raj, who never arrives. Instead, Babloo finds her. She reveals she's pregnant, and they both hold hands, crying and bonding over their love for, and betrayal by, the same person.

=== Khilauna ===
The story opens with Meenal losing electricity at her home.

Meenal is a street-smart housemaid who lives in the slums along with her little sister Binny. She struggles to make ends meet and send her little sister to school. She works in a rich locality for a lady who is struggling to conceive. It is shown that Meenal holds contempt for the rich people she works for. When told about her electricity problem, her employer mentions that she could seek help from Vinod Agarwal, the new secretary of the locality. In the same locality is Sushil, who owns a small laundry stall. While in the locality, Sushil is seen cussing Meenal and his sister, but behind everyone's back, they are lovers. The story keeps flipping back and forth between the present, where Meenal is shown to be at a police station with a policewoman inquiring her about the 'incident' and her telling that she had nothing to do with it.

It is shown that Vinod Agarwal has a pregnant wife and has the hots for Meenal. He finds her at Sushil's stall and asks her to work at his place to help his wife. Meenal happily agrees, hoping to get in a word with him regarding electricity at her place. Meenal leaves her employer for Vinod Agarwal, and she is shown to have a good bond with the pregnant wife. When the wife is away, Vinod makes a move on Meenal, asking her to have sex with him if she needs electricity back. Binny witnesses this. Meenal leaves crying and goes to Sushil's stall. He is concerned and asks her about what happened. Later, Vinod Agarwal also arrives at Sushil's stall and starts hitting him for flirting with women and being insolent. Passers-by stop this fight, and the secretary apologizes for his misconduct. Vinod also invites Meenal, Sushil, and Binny to a party he and his wife are hosting to celebrate the birth of their son. In the present, the police bring Sushil to the station and beat him up. Meenal is warned that if she doesn't reveal what she did, it would be Binny's screams she'd be hearing next. Sushil begs the police to stop hitting him and tells him that he didn't do anything except breaking the transformer and that Vinod Agarwal made a move on Meenal. Meenal takes the name of her previous employer, saying she did it as she was jealous that she was infertile. We're taken back to the party where we see Meenal, Binny, Abha (the ex-employer) taking turns with the baby. Sushil arrives and is shown to be very angry. He steals some alcohol and heads out of the party, drunk, and breaks the transformer, leading to a power cut in the party. Vinod Agarwal and his wife get some flashlights and realize their baby is missing. They look for him, and Vinod goes to the kitchen to see the pressure cooker releasing blood instead of water. Abha arrives at the police station and says something to the police. The police then search Binny's bag and find the baby's toy in it. When asked if she took it from the baby, Binny replies that she did so because the baby was just a toy.

=== Geeli Pucchi ===
Bharti Mandal is a worker at a factory. She is well educated and qualified and is looking to get a higher-paying data operator job in the same factory. Her dreams are shattered with the arrival of Priya Sharma, who is given the position not because she has the right technical skills for the job but because she has the right connections. Bharti is bitter and is told by a co-worker that she didn't get the job because of her caste.

Priya arrives at the canteen for lunch and tries to strike a conversation with Bharti, who doesn't reciprocate. Bharti gets into an altercation with a male co-worker and is hurt. Priya tends to her wounds and tells her that she reminds her of her childhood friend Kavita. When asked her full name, Bharti lies that she's Bharti Banerjee. The two ladies go out together the next day when Priya reveals to Bharti that she doesn't know any of the technical skills required for the job but was only employed because of her palm-reading skills. This greatly hurts Bharti, and she cries while Priya hugs her. Slowly, they start developing a bond. Priya reveals to Bharti that her childhood friend Kavita doesn't talk to her anymore and is married and doesn't want anything to do with her because she's happy.

One day, Priya visits Bharti, and they have a moment. Priya is visibly upset and apologizes. Later on, Priya invites Bharti to her birthday party, where she lives with her husband and in-laws. Priya gets very emotional during the party, and when Bharti and Priya are alone, she reveals that she feels no love for her husband even though he's accommodating and nice. She also tells her that her husband wants a baby, and she doesn't feel right about it. Bharti tells her that it's not a defect and the only easy way out is to accept the truth. She then reveals to Priya that she's Bharti Mandal and that her family belongs to the lower Dalit caste whose women are traditionally in the midwifery business. This causes a change in Priya's attitude.

Priya is then thrown a surprise birthday party in the office with her company's higher officials. Bharti is not allowed and is only called in to serve cake to everyone. Bharti cries, and when Priya comes to her, she tells her that the best way to deal with her internal conflict is to have a baby and become a mother just like Kavita. She then goes on to help Priya conceive while she handles Priya's work. A now pregnant Priya goes on maternity leave, recommending Bharti to take over her responsibilities. After the birth, Bharti visits Priya. Priya's husband mentions that she'd return to work soon, but Priya's mother-in-law is completely against it. She asks Bharti for her opinion since she comes from a family of midwives. Bharti recommends against returning to work. Bharti goes to work and is told that Priya has quit and Bharti can now take over the job completely.

=== Ankahi ===
Natasha and Rohan are parents to Samaira, who is on the verge of going deaf. While Natasha is a loving and supportive mother, Rohan is a distant father, immersed in work and reluctant to learn sign language to communicate with his daughter. After an altercation with Rohan, Natasha visits a photo gallery where she meets Kabir, a deaf and mute photographer. They bond and start hanging out often. One day, Natasha visits Kabir's house, and they both have an intimate moment. Natasha walks out, realizing that it is wrong. However, she finds a text message from Rohan saying that he is busy with work and leaving Samaira at his mother's. This causes Natasha to go back to Kabir, and they make love. The next morning, Kabir wants to reveal his love for her but is hesitant. Natasha dresses up and leaves for her house. Kabir follows her, mustering the courage to reveal his feelings for her. Natasha reaches home and is happy to find Rohan communicating with Samaira in sign language, and they are both bonding, making jokes, and laughing. She's happy at this change and turns around to close the door only to see Kabir standing outside in tears. She does not know what to do and closes the door, apologizing and crying. Samaira, who has witnessed all of this, asks her mother if Kabir loved her.

== Cast ==
=== Majnu (Shashank Khaitan) ===
- Fatima Sana Shaikh as Lipakshi
- Jaideep Ahlawat as Babloo
- Abhay Joshi as Mishra
- Armaan Ralhan as Raj
- Tawhid Rike Zaman as Farhan
- Arvind Pandey as Gopal

=== Khilauna (Raj Mehta) ===
- Nushrratt Bharuccha as Meenal
- Abhishek Banerjee as Sushil
- Inayat Verma as Binny
- Maneesh Verma as Vinod Agarwal
- Sreedhar Dubey as Police Inspector Jairam Srivastav

=== Geeli Pucchi (Neeraj Ghaywan) ===
- Konkona Sen Sharma as Bharti Mandal
- Aditi Rao Hydari as Priya Sharma
- Gyan Prakash as Bharti's boss
- Bachan Pachehra as Dashrat
- Sreedhar Dubey as Shiv Sharma, Priya's husband

=== Ankahi (Kayoze Irani) ===
- Shefali Shah as Natasha "Nats" Sharma
- Manav Kaul as Kabir
- Tota Roy Chowdhury as Rohan Sharma
- Sara Arjun as Samaira Sharma

== Release ==
The film was released on Netflix on 16 April 2021.

== Soundtrack ==
Ajeeb Daastaans

Soundtrack album by John Stewart Eduri, Alokananda Dasgupta, Shailendra Barve
- Released: 4 July 2021
- Recorded: 2021
- Genre: Feature film soundtrack
- Length: 7:35
- Language: Hindi
- Label: Sony Music India

All songs under license Sony Music India.

No.	Title	Lyrics	Music	Singer(s)	Length
1.	"Sang Rehna"	Varun Grover	Alokananda Dasgupta	Alokananda Dasgupta, Ronkini Gupta	2:42
2.	"Paani Mein Aag"	Shashank Khaitan	John Stewart Eduri	John Stewart Eduri, Shashank Khaitan, Jahnavi Kejriwal	2:15
3.	"Ajeeb Daastaans Title Track"	Shailendra Barve	Shailendra Barve	Shailendra Barve	2:38
Total length:					7:35

== Reception ==
On the review aggregator website Rotten Tomatoes, 100% of 13 critics' reviews are positive, with an average rating of 6.3/10.

Avinash Lohana of Pinkvilla wrote in his review that the film is "an emotional ride but not without bumps." He reviewed Geeli Pucchi as the best of all and appreciated the performances of Konkana Sen Sharma and Aditi Rao Hydari.

Rohan Nahar of Hindustan Times wrote that the film is inconsistent and uneven. He called Neeraj Ghaywan's segment a saver and appreciated Kayoz Irani's film for strong performances by Shefali Shah and Manav Kaul.

== Accolades ==
Year	Award	Category	Recipient	Result	Ref.
2021	Asian Academy Creative Awards	Best Actress in a Leading Role	Konkona Sen Sharma	Won	
2021	Busan International Film Festival	Best Actress	Nushrratt Bharuccha	Nominated	
2021	Filmfare OTT Awards	Best Web Original Film	Ajeeb Daastaans	Nominated	
2021	Filmfare OTT Awards	Best Actress in a Web Original Film	Konkona Sen Sharma	Won	
2021	Filmfare OTT Awards	Best Actor in a Web Original Film	Manav Kaul	Nominated	
