= Shashank Khaitan =

Indian filmmaker (born 1982)

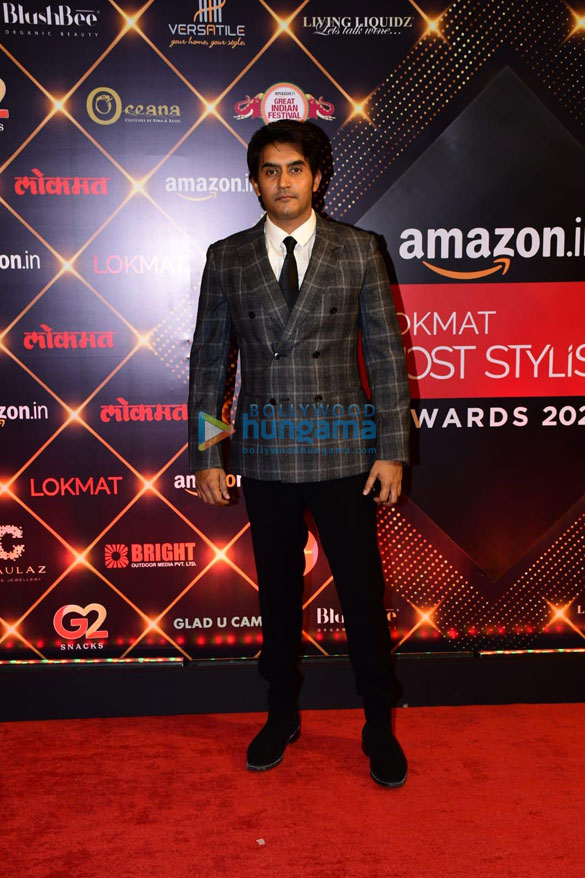
- Born: 28 February 1982 (age 44); Calcutta, West Bengal, India
- Occupations: Director, screenwriter, actor, film producer

Shashank Khaitan is an Indian screenwriter, director, actor and producer who works in Hindi cinema. He is known for his association with Dharma Productions, having written and directed the Dulhania films, Humpty Sharma (2014) and Badrinath (2017), which starred Varun Dhawan and Alia Bhatt. Khaitan earned a Filmfare Award for Best Director nomination for the latter. He then wrote and directed the romantic drama Dhadak (2018), a remake of the 2016 Marathi-language film Sairat.

Following two independent production ventures for Dharma including Good Newwz (2019), he founded Mentor Disciple Entertainment, whose maiden venture was his next film, Govinda Naam Mera (2022). Apart from directing a segment of the 2021 Netflix anthology Ajeeb Daastaans, he has since written scripts for Dil Bechara (2020) and Rocky Aur Rani Kii Prem Kahaani (2023), and produced the action thriller Yodha (2024).

== Early life ==
Khaitan was born in Calcutta and raised in Nashik, Maharashtra, in a Marwari business family. Khaitan was initially more interested in sports, playing in cricket and tennis tournaments. At the age of 17, he decided to pursue a career in entertainment. He started off as a dance instructor. He soon moved to Mumbai. Khaitan joined Whistling Woods International Institute, a film institute started and supported by veteran filmmaker Subhash Ghai, to break into the film industry. He credits the institute with giving him the technical background. While at Whistling Woods, Khaitan worked on his first attempted film, Sherwani Kahaan Hai, with some of his fellow students, but it was not successfully completed.

In 2008, Khaitan starred as Manohar in Roorkee By-Pass, a 22-minute drama directed by Arundhati Sen Verma, and assisted on the set of Ghai's films Black & White and Yuvvraaj. He also made a brief appearance in Disney's ABCD 2, a sequel to the dance-drama ABCD: Any Body Can Dance.

== Career ==
Khaitan made his directional debut with the romantic comedy Humpty Sharma Ki Dulhania. His initial plan with Humpty Sharma Ki Dulhania was to make it a story of two con artists, similar to Bunty Aur Babli, but the script eventually became a story of a flirtatious Punjabi boy who engages in a romantic affair with an engaged Punjabi woman once he found the characters turning sweeter and falling in love. After finishing the first draft of his script, then with the title Humpty Sharma Di Love Story, Khaitan sent it to Dharma Productions, wherein producer Karan Johar approved its production with a first time writer-director at the helm, breaking a legacy norm at the company wherein most debutante directors had previously served as assistant and/or associate directors in the company's films. Khaitan cited Dilwale Dulhania Le Jayenge (DDLJ) and Casablanca as inspiration for his script, and the film itself pays homage to DDLJ as well as Kuch Kuch Hota Hai. The film was released on 11 July 2014 to positive critical reception and earned over ₹1.11 billion (US$12 million) worldwide.

Khaitan's next venture was the romantic comedy Badrinath Ki Dulhania (2017)—which reunited him with Bhatt and Dhawan. It tells the story of an independent young woman (Bhatt) who refuses to conform to patriarchal expectations from her chauvinistic fiancée (Dhawan). Rachel Saltz of The New York Times took note of the film's statement on gender equality. The film proved to be commercial successes, earning over ₹2 billion (US$21 million) at the box office. It earned him a nomination for the Filmfare Award for Best Director.

Khaitan had begun co-writing the script for the Hindi adaptation of John Green's 2012 novel The Fault in Our Stars with the intent to direct it for Dharma Productions with Janhvi Kapoor and Ishaan Khatter as leads in 2017. However, after Dharma opted out, he eventually went on to direct them instead in Dhadak, a remake of the Marathi film Sairat (2016) which released the following year. While Dhadak received negative reviews from film critics for glossing over the subject of caste-based discrimination and for being a poor remake of the original, it emerged as a commercial success with worldwide earnings of over ₹1.1 billion (US$11 million).

Khaitan later turned an independent producer for Dharma Productions with the comedy Good Newwz (2019), which emerged as one of highest-grossing Bollywood film of 2019 and the horror thriller Bhoot – Part One: The Haunted Ship (2020), the first installment of a planned horror franchise which ultimately did not expand as of 2025. His adaptation of The Fault in Our Stars was finally released under the title Dil Bechara the same year. The following year, he wrote and directed a segment titled Majnu in the Netflix anthology Ajeeb Daastaans. He was to direct Dhawan and Kapoor again alongside Bhumi Pednekar in what was touted to be the spy thriller Mr. Lele, but the project was indefinitely postponed in light of the COVID-19 pandemic, and he later reportedly revived it as a comedy thriller titled Govinda Naam Mera (2022); starring Vicky Kaushal as the titular character instead of Dhawan, Kiara Advani instead of Kapoor, and Pednekar, it was streamed on Disney+ Hotstar.

Khaitan next wrote the story and screenplay for Johar's comeback film as director, the romantic comedy drama Rocky Aur Rani Kii Prem Kahaani (2023), starring Ranveer Singh and Bhatt, with Dhawan making a cameo appearance in a song. The following year, he produced his first collaboration with Dhawan's and Bhatt's fellow debutante Sidharth Malhotra, the action thriller Yodha, under Mentor Disciple Entertainment alongside Johar. His next film as writer, producer and director, Bedhadak, was also announced, but has been indefinitely shelved as of 2025.

== Filmography ==
=== Films ===
Year	Title	Director	Writer	Producer	Notes
2014	Humpty Sharma Ki Dulhania	Yes	Yes	No	Nominated—Filmfare Award for Best Debut Director
2017	Badrinath Ki Dulhania	Yes	Yes	No	Nominated—Filmfare Award for Best Director
2018	Dhadak	Yes	Yes	No	Remake of Sairat
2019	Good Newwz	No	No	Yes	Directed by Raj Mehta
2020	Bhoot – Part One: The Haunted Ship	No	No	Yes	Directed by Bhanu Pratap Singh
2020	Dil Bechara	No	Yes	No	Remake of The Fault in Our Stars; Released on Disney Plus Hotstar; Directed by Mukesh Chhabra
2021	Ajeeb Daastaans	Yes	No	No	Segment: "Majnu"; Netflix anthology film
2022	Govinda Naam Mera	Yes	Yes	Yes	Released on Disney Plus Hotstar
2023	Rocky Aur Rani Kii Prem Kahaani	No	Yes	No	Directed by Karan Johar
2024	Yodha	No	No	Yes	Directed by Pushkar Ojha and Sagar Ambre
2024	Binny And Family	No	No	Yes	
2025	Sunny Sanskari Ki Tulsi Kumari	Yes	Yes	Yes	

==== As assistant director ====
Year	Film
2008	Black & White
2008	Yuvvraaj

==== As actor ====
Year	Film	Role
2012	Ishaqzaade	Dharma Chauhan
2015	ABCD 2	Dance judge
2022	Govinda Naam Mera	Anand Joshi

=== Television ===
Year	Show	Channel	Role	Notes
2018–2019	Dance Deewane	Colors TV	Judge	Seasons 1 and 2
2025	Single Papa	—N/a	Director, Executive producer	Netflix series

== Awards and nominations ==
List of Shashank Khaitan awards and nominations
Year	Category	Nominated work	Result
Filmfare Awards
2015	Best Debut Director	Humpty Sharma Ki Dulhania	Nominated
2018	Best Director	Badrinath Ki Dulhania	Nominated
2024	Best Screenplay	Rocky Aur Rani Kii Prem Kahaani	Nominated
2024	Best Story	Rocky Aur Rani Kii Prem Kahaani	Nominated
