= Kayoze Irani =

Indian actor

- Born: 20 November 1987 (age 38); Mumbai, Maharashtra, India
- Occupations: Actor; film director
- Years active: 2012–present
- Father: Boman Irani

Kayoze Irani is an Indian actor and film director. He is the son of actor Boman Irani.

== Early life and career ==
Irani was born in Mumbai, Maharashtra, India to a Parsi Zoroastrian family. He is the son of actor Boman Irani and Zenobia Irani. He completed his Bachelor of Arts in Film, Television & New Media Production from Kishinchand Chellaram College in Mumbai.

After acting in Student of the Year (2012), Irani switched to direction and directed the segment "Ankahi" in Ajeeb Daastaans (2021) before working as an assistant director in Dhamaka later that year. He made his debut as a director for a feature film with Sarzameen (2025).

== Filmography ==
Year	Title	Role(s)	Notes
2012	Student of the Year	Kaizaad 'Sudo' Sodabottleopenerwala	
2013	Bombay Talkies		Uncredited
2014	Youngistaan	Zafar	Special appearance
2016	The Legend of Michael Mishra	Half 'HP' Pant	

=== As director ===
Year	Title	Notes
2021	Ajeeb Daastaans	Segment: "Ankahi"
2025	Sarzameen	
