= Adar Poonawalla =

Indian businessman

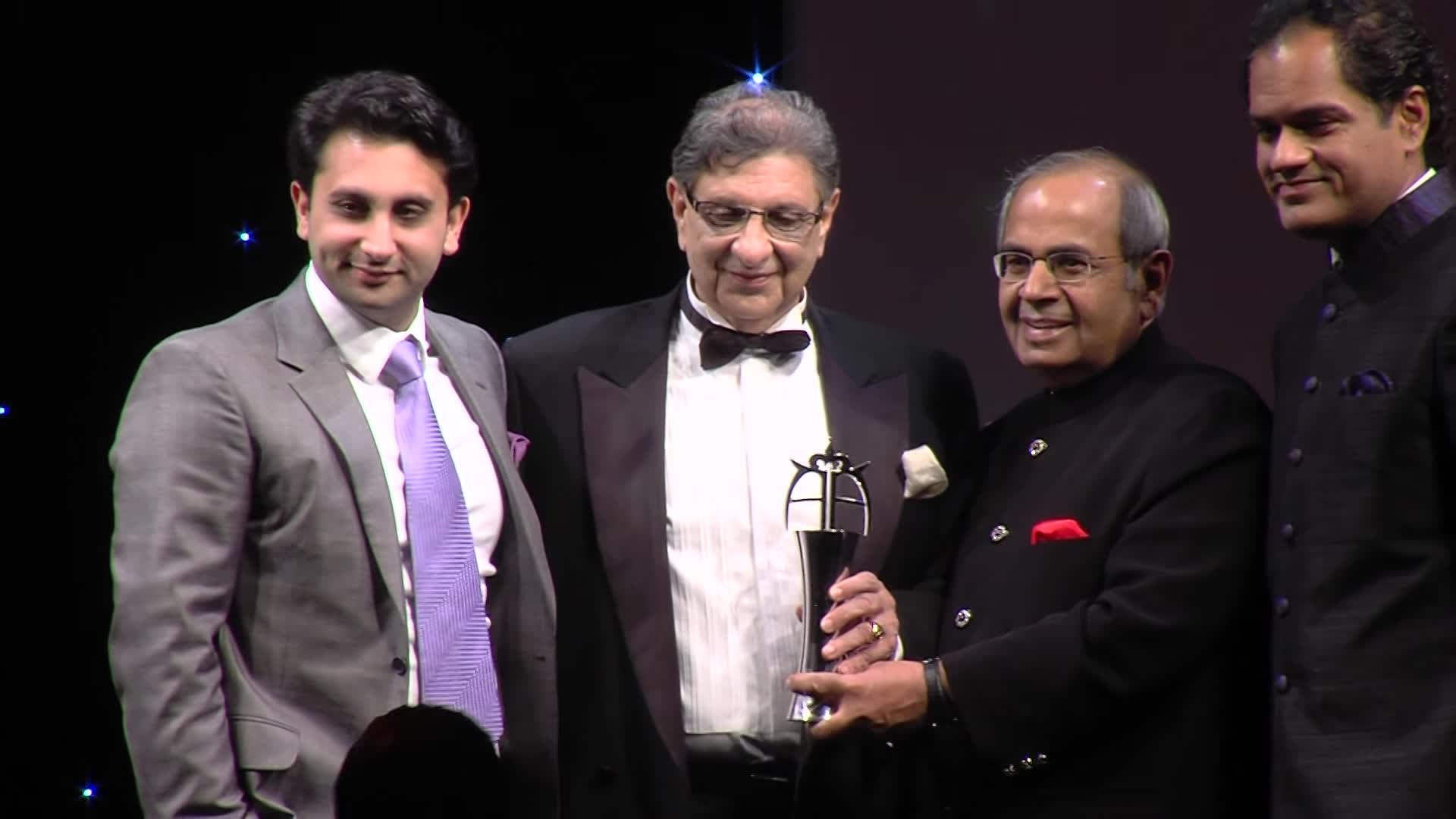
- Adar (on left) and Cyrus Poonawalla in 2014
- Born: 14 January 1981 (age 45)
- Citizenship: Indian
- Education: The Bishop's School (Pune); St Edmund's School Canterbury
- Alma mater: University of Westminster
- Occupation: Businessman
- Title: CEO, Serum Institute of India
- Term: 2011–present
- Spouse: Natasha Aurora (m. 2006)
- Children: 2
- Father: Cyrus Poonawalla
- Website: www.adarpoonawalla.com

Adar Villoo Cyrus Poonawalla (born 14 January 1981) is an Indian businessman. He is the CEO of Serum Institute of India and chairman of Poonawalla Fincorp. His father is Cyrus Poonawalla, founder of the Serum Institute of India.

Poonawalla was listed in Time's 100 most influential people in 2021.

== Personal life ==
Poonawalla was born to Cyrus and Villoo Poonawala, in a Pune based Parsi family. He is married to Natasha Poonawalla (née Aurora) and together they have two children. In December 2023, Poonawalla purchased the most expensive property in London worth Rs 1446 crore (£138 million).

== Education ==
Poonawalla was educated at The Bishop's School (Pune) and at the St Edmund's School Canterbury followed by the University of Westminster.

== Career ==
Poonawalla joined the Serum Institute of India in 2001, after graduating from university. Then exporting its products to 35 countries, Poonawalla concentrated on the company's international market, new products license and getting pre-qualified by the World Health Organization for supply to United Nations Agencies including UNICEF and PAHO. As of 2015, he has helped the company export its products to over 140 countries; 85 percent of its revenues are from overseas.

In 2011, he became the CEO. In 2012, he played a major role in the acquisition of Bilthoven Biologicals, a Netherlands-based government vaccine manufacturing company. Poonawalla is a board member of the GAVI Alliance, the global vaccine alliance.

He initiated and launched Serum Institute's oral polio vaccine in 2014, which became a bestseller for the company. It was reported that he planned to expand the product portfolio to include vaccines for dengue, flu, and cervical cancer during the same year.

In 2021, Poonawalla was provided with 'Y' category security by the Indian government after he declared that he left India for London because of threats demanding COVID-19 vaccines. Poonawalla also said that he will start COVID vaccine production outside India, in addition to the ongoing production in India.

In May 2021, he was appointed chairman of Poonawalla Fincorp, after acquiring a 66% stake in the financial services company.

In 2024, he acquired a 50% stake in Dharma Productions for ₹1,000 crore.

== Philanthropy ==
In 2020, Serum Institute of India announced that it would donate $66 million to the University of Oxford to fund the creation of the Poonawalla Vaccines Research Building.

== Awards ==
- In 2016, he was listed by GQ Magazine and awarded Philanthropist of the year.
- In 2017, he received Humanitarian Endeavour Award In Hall of Fame Awards 2017 and was also awarded as Indian of the Year in CSR Business Category on CNN-News18
- In 2018, Chief Minister Devendra Fadnavis presented the ET Edge Maharashtra Achievers Awards of Business Leader of the Year to Poonawala, he further received CNBC Asia's award for Corporate Social Responsibility in the same year
- In 2020, Poonawalla was included in a Fortune magazine's '40 Under 40' listing in the healthcare category.
- In 2021, he was awarded Entrepreneur of the Year by Economic Times.
- In 2021, he was included on the Time 100, Time's annual list of the 100 most influential people in the world.
