= Raj Mehta =

Indian film director

- Occupations: Film director; screenwriter
- Years active: 2019–present

Raj Mehta is an Indian film director and screenwriter who works in Hindi films. He has directed films such as Good Newwz (2019), Jugjugg Jeeyo (2022), and Selfiee (2023).

== Personal life ==
Mehta pursued filmmaking at the New York Film Academy, before foraying into films.

== Filmography ==
Year	Title	Director	Screenwriter	Ref.
2019	Good Newwz	Yes	Dialogues	
2021	Ajeeb Daastaans	Yes	No	
2022	Jugjugg Jeeyo	Yes	No	
2023	Selfiee	Yes	No	
2027	Lag Jaa Gale †	Yes	No	
