= Dharma Productions =

Indian film production company

Dharma Productions Pvt. Ltd.
- Trade name: Dharma Productions
- Industry: Entertainment
- Founded: 1976 in Mumbai, Maharashtra
- Founder: Yash Johar
- Headquarters: Mumbai, Maharashtra
- Key people: Apoorva Mehta; Hiroo Yash Johar; Karan Johar
- Products: Film production; Film distribution; Television production; Streaming television; Music
- Owner: Karan Johar (50%); Adar Poonawalla (50%)
- Subsidiaries: Dharmatic Entertainment; Dharma Distribution; Dharma 2.0; Dharma Cornerstone Agency
- Website: dharma-production.com

Dharma Productions Pvt. Ltd. is an Indian film production and distribution company established by Yash Johar in 1976. It was taken over in 2004, after his death, by his son, Karan Johar. Based in Mumbai, it mainly produces and distributes Hindi films.

In July 2016, a new sector of the company was launched called Dharma 2.0, which focuses on producing advertising commercials. Another subsidiary of the studio was created in November 2018, called Dharmatic Entertainment, which produces film and television content for online distribution platforms.

== History ==
=== 1980–1998 ===
The company's first production was Raj Khosla's Dostana (1980), starring Amitabh Bachchan, Shatrughan Sinha, and Zeenat Aman. The film was one of the highest-grossing Bollywood films of the year.

The company then went on to produce Duniya (1984) and Muqaddar Ka Faisla (1987), neither of which performed well at the box office. This was followed by Agneepath (1990), which did not emerge as a commercial success at that time but was later regarded as a cult film. It also won a National Film Award for its lead actor, Amitabh Bachchan. The company's next two films, Gumrah (1993) and Duplicate (1998), which were both directed by Mahesh Bhatt, met with moderate success at the box office.

=== 1998–2009 ===
In 1998, the same year as Duplicate, Dharma Productions also released the romantic comedy-drama Kuch Kuch Hota Hai, which was the directorial debut of Karan Johar, the son of Yash Johar, owner of the production company. The film, starring Shah Rukh Khan, Kajol, Rani Mukerji, and Salman Khan, proved to be a phenomenal success, and this opened a whole new chapter in the history of the company. The film won several awards, including the National Film Award for Best Popular Film Providing Wholesome Entertainment and the Filmfare Award for Best Film.

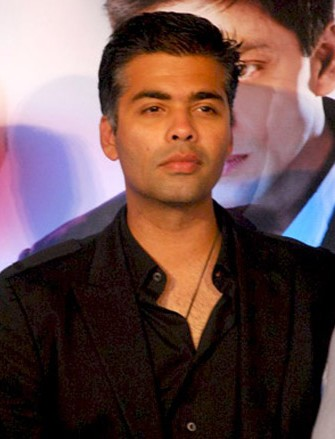
Karan Johar has directed seven feature films and has produced all of the company's films since his father's death in 2004.

The company's next film was Karan Johar's family drama Kabhi Khushi Kabhie Gham (2001), featuring an ensemble cast including Amitabh Bachchan, Jaya Bachchan, Shah Rukh Khan, Kajol, Hrithik Roshan, and Kareena Kapoor. This was followed by Nikhil Advani's romantic comedy-drama Kal Ho Naa Ho (2003), starring Jaya Bachchan, Shah Rukh Khan, Saif Ali Khan, and Preity Zinta. Both of these films earned widespread critical acclaim and emerged as major commercial successes, ranking as the top domestic and overseas earners in their respective release years.

Dharma's next release was the natural horror film Kaal (2005), which received mixed reviews from critics.

This was followed by Karan Johar's musical romantic drama Kabhi Alvida Naa Kehna (2006), featuring an ensemble cast of Amitabh Bachchan, Shah Rukh Khan, Abhishek Bachchan, Rani Mukerji, Preity Zinta, and Kirron Kher. Exploring themes of marital infidelity, emotional dissatisfaction, and dysfunctional relationships, the film opened to mixed-to-positive reviews from critics and audiences upon release; moreover, it emerged as a major commercial success at the domestic box office and became the highest-grossing Indian film of all time overseas at the time of its release. It has since been regarded as a cult classic and ahead of its time due to its central theme, storyline, and characterizations.

Dharma's next release was Tarun Mansukhani's commercially successful romantic comedy Dostana (2008), starring Abhishek Bachchan, John Abraham, and Priyanka Chopra. This was followed by Ayan Mukerji's coming-of-age comedy-drama Wake Up Sid (2009) starring Konkona Sen Sharma and Ranbir Kapoor, and Rensil D'Silva's counter-terrorism thriller Kurbaan (2009) starring Saif Ali Khan and Kareena Kapoor.

=== 2010–present ===
Dharma's first release of 2018 was Meghna Gulzar's spy thriller Raazi, starring Alia Bhatt and Vicky Kaushal, based on Harinder Sikka's novel Calling Sehmat. The film emerged as a critical and commercial success. Later that year came Shashank Khaitan's romance Dhadak (2018), which launched the careers of lead actors Ishaan Khatter and Janhvi Kapoor. This was an adaptation of the Marathi film Sairat (2016). In November 2018, a new sector of the company was introduced called Dharmatic, focusing on producing digital content for online distribution.

In 2019, Anurag Singh's Kesari, a period drama based on the Battle of Saragarhi, starred Akshay Kumar and Parineeti Chopra in lead roles. The film earned Rs. 200 crores worldwide in the box office and is currently Kumar's highest-grossing film.

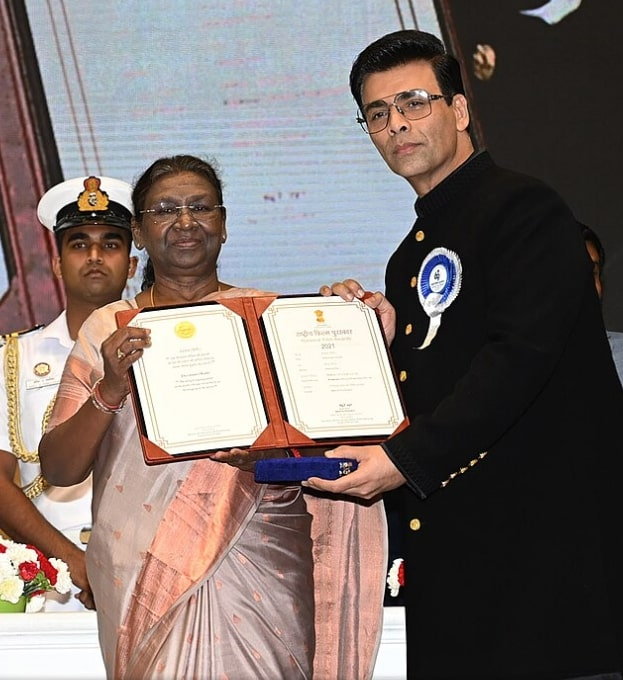
Johar receiving the National Film Award for Shershaah, c. 2023

Dharma released the biopic Gunjan Saxena: The Kargil Girl starring Jahnvi Kapoor in the lead on August 12, 2020. On 12 August 2021, it released the biographical film based on the life of Capt. Vikram Batra, Shershaah, which won several accolades, including the National Film Award – Special Jury Award and the Filmfare Award for Best Film.

In 2024, Adar Poonawalla, CEO of Serum Institute of India, acquired a 50% stake in Karan Johar's Dharma Productions for approximately ₹1000 crore.

== Dharmatic Entertainment ==
In November 2018, Dharma Productions launched a new subsidiary called Dharmatic Entertainment. Johar revealed the focus of the division would be on developing and producing digital content for online distribution platforms. He furthermore announced that he and Apoorva Mehta, who also serves as the chief executive officer of Dharma Productions, would be jointly heading the unit with Somen Mishra (head of creative development at the parent company) and former journalist Aneesha Baig heading and overseeing fiction and non-fiction content.

In September 2019, Dharmatic Entertainment signed a multi-year exclusive content deal with Netflix India under which the studio would develop and produce a range of fictional and non-fictional series and films for the streaming platform, which would be released as originals.

=== Film ===
Year	Title	Director	Platform	Producer(s)	Notes	Ref.
2020	Guilty	Ruchi Narain	Netflix	Karan Johar; Apoorva Mehta	Debut production venture	
2021	Ajeeb Daastaans	Shashank Khaitan; Raj Mehta; Neeraj Ghaywan; Kayoze Irani	Netflix	Karan Johar; Apoorva Mehta	Anthology film	
2021	Searching for Sheela	Shakun Batra	Netflix	Karan Johar; Apoorva Mehta; Somen Mishra	Documentary film on Ma Anand Sheela	
2021	Meenakshi Sundareshwar	Vivek Soni	Netflix	Karan Johar; Apoorva Mehta; Somen Mishra	Romantic comedy	
2024	Ae Watan Mere Watan	Kannan Iyer	Amazon Prime Video	Karan Johar; Apoorva Mehta; Somen Mishra	Biographical film	
2025	Nadaaniyan	Shauna Gautam	Netflix	Karan Johar; Apoorva Mehta; Somen Mishra; Adar Poonawalla	Romantic comedy	
2025	Aap Jaisa Koi	Vivek Soni	Netflix	Karan Johar; Apoorva Mehta; Somen Mishra; Adar Poonawalla	Romantic drama	
2026	Accused	Anubhuti Kashyap	Netflix	Karan Johar; Apoorva Mehta; Somen Mishra; Adar Poonawalla	Thriller drama	

=== Television ===
Year	Title	Director	Platform	Producer(s)	Notes	Ref.
2020—present	Fabulous Lives of Bollywood Wives	Uttam Domale	Netflix	Karan Johar; Aneesha Baig; Ankur Poddar; Hetvi Karia; Apoorva Mehta	Reality series	
2022	The Fame Game	Sri Rao; Bejoy Nambiar; Karishma Kohli	Netflix	Karan Johar; Apoorva Mehta	Mystery family drama	
2022—present	Koffee with Karan	Jahnvi Obhan	Disney+ Hotstar	Karan Johar; Apoorva Mehta; Aneesha Baig	Talk show (season 7–)	
2024	Showtime	Mihir Desai; Archit Kumar	Disney+ Hotstar	Karan Johar; Apoorva Mehta; Somen Mishra	Drama	
2024	Love Storiyaan	Rahul Badwelkar; Collin D'Cunha; Akshay Indikar; Shazia Iqbal; Hardik Mehta; Archana Phadke; Vivek Soni	Amazon Prime Video	Karan Johar; Apoorva Mehta; Somen Mishra	Documentary series	
2024	Gyaarah Gyaarah	Umesh Bist	ZEE5	Karan Johar; Apoorva Mehta; Guneet Monga; Achin Jain	Fantasy thriller; Remake of Signal (South Korean TV series)	
2024—present	Call Me Bae	Colin D'Cunha	Amazon Prime Video	Karan Johar; Apoorva Mehta; Somen Mishra	Comedy drama	
2024	The Tribe	Omkar Potdar	Amazon Prime Video	Karan Johar; Apoorva Mehta; Aneesha Baig	Reality series	
2025	Do You Wanna Partner	Archit Kumar; Colin D'Cunha	Amazon Prime Video	Karan Johar; Adar Poonawalla; Apoorva Mehta	Comedy drama	
2026	Student of the Year: After Dark	Reema Maya	JioHotstar	Karan Johar; Adar Poonawalla; Apoorva Mehta; Somen Mishra	Thriller	
