= Pankaj Tripathi filmography =

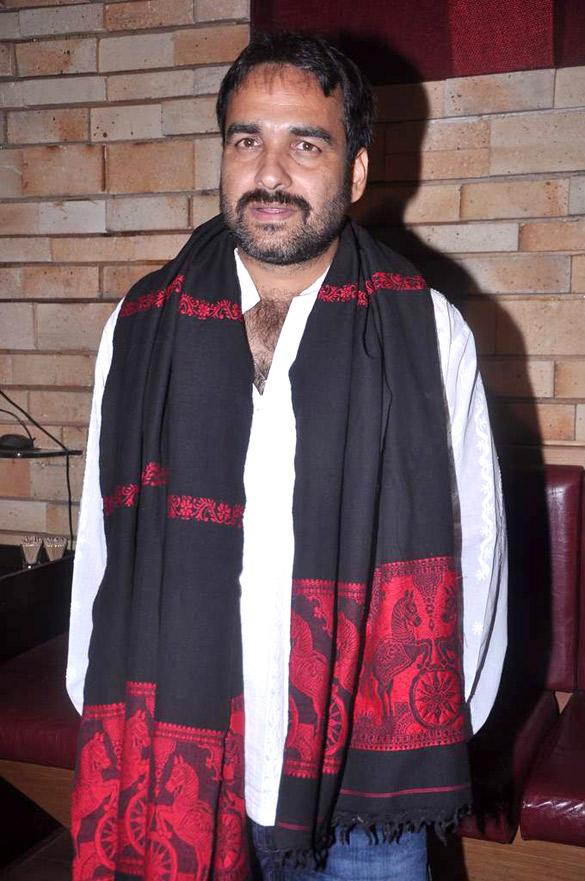

Pankaj Tripathi is an Indian actor who predominantly works in Hindi cinema and has also appeared in English, Kannada, Telugu, Punjabi and Tamil language films. He is the recipient of several awards, including a National Film Award, a Filmfare Award, a Screen Award, and an IIFA Award.

== Films ==
Key
†	Denotes films that have not yet been released

List of Pankaj Tripathi film credits
Year	Title	Role	Notes	Ref.
2003	Chigurida Kanasu	Shankar's college friend	Uncredited role; Kannada film	
2004	Run	Unnamed	Uncredited role	
2005	Apaharan	Gaya Singh's Friend		
2006	Omkara	Kichlu		
2007	Dharm	Suryaprakash		
2008	Mithya	Tipnis		
2008	Shaurya	Major Virendra Rathore		
2009	Chintu Ji	Paplu Yadav		
2009	Barah Aana	Inspector		
2009	Pyaar Bina Chain Kaha Re	Villain	Bhojpuri film	
2010	Valmiki Ki Bandook	BDO Tripathi	Short film	
2010	Raavan	Gulabiya		
2010	Aakrosh	Kishore		
2011	Chillar Party	Secretary Dubey		
2012	Agneepath	Surya		
2012	Gangs of Wasseypur – Part 1	Sultan Qureshi		
2012	Gangs of Wasseypur – Part 2	Sultan Qureshi		
2012	Dabangg 2	Filawar		
2013	ABCD: Any Body Can Dance	Vardha Bhai		
2013	Rangrezz	Brijbihari Pande		
2013	Fukrey	Pandit		
2013	Anwar Ka Ajab Kissa	Amol		
2013	Maazii	Rathiji		
2013	Doosukeltha	Dilleeswara Rao	Telugu film	
2014	Gunday	Lateef		
2014	Singham Returns	Altaf		
2015	Manjhi – The Mountain Man	Ruab		
2015	Life Biryani			
2015	Masaan	Sadhya Ji		
2015	Dilwale	Anwar		
2016	Nil Battey Sannata	Principal Srivastava		
2016	Global Baba	Damru		
2016	Mango Dreams	Salim	English film	
2017	Coffee with D	Girdhari		
2017	Anaarkali of Aarah	Rangeela		
2017	Newton	Atma Singh		
2017	Gurgaon	Kehri Singh	First lead role	
2017	Bareilly Ki Barfi	Narottam Mishra		
2017	Fukrey Returns	Pandit		
2017	Munna Michael	Balli		
2018	Kaala	Pankaj Patil	Tamil film	
2018	Angrezi Mein Kehte Hain	Feroz		
2018	Phamous	Tripathi		
2018	Stree	Rudra		
2018	Harjeeta	Coach	Punjabi film	
2018	Bhaiaji Superhit	Builder Gupta		
2018	Yours Truly	Vijay		
2019	Luka Chuppi	Babulal		
2019	The Tashkent Files	Gangaram Jha		
2019	Super 30	Shriram Singh		
2019	Kissebaaz	Chuttan Shukla		
2019	Arjun Patiala	Producer		
2019	Drive	Hamid		
2020	Angrezi Medium	Tony		
2020	Extraction	Ovi Mahajan Sr.	English film	
2020	Gunjan Saxena: The Kargil Girl	Anup Saxena		
2020	Ludo	Rahul Satyendra Tripathi		
2020	Shakeela	Salim		
2021	Kaagaz	Bharatlal Bihari		
2021	Mimi	Bhanu		
2021	Bunty Aur Babli 2	Jatayu Singh		
2021	83	PR Man Singh		
2022	Bachchhan Paandey	Bhaves Bhoplo		
2022	Sherdil	Gangaram		
2022	Naam Tha Kanhaiyalal	Himself	Documentary	
2023	OMG 2	Kanti Sharan Mudgal		
2023	Fukrey 3	Pandit		
2023	Kadak Singh	Kadak Singh		
2024	Main Atal Hoon	Atal Bihari Vajpayee		
2024	Murder Mubarak	ACP Bhavani Singh		
2024	Stree 2	Rudra		
2025	Metro... In Dino	Monty		
2026	Krishnavataram Part 1: The Heart (Hridayam)	Vyasa, author of Mahābhārata		
2026	Ohh My Dog	Master ji		
2026	Mirzapur: The Movie	Akhandanand "Kaleen" Tripathi		
2026	Parivarik ManuRanjan	Ranjan Dubey		

== Television ==
List of Pankaj Tripathi television credits
Year	Title	Role	Platform	Notes	Ref.
2004	Chaudah phere		Doordarshan		
2006	Time Bomb 9/11	RAW Officer Tripathi	Zee TV		
2010–11	Zindagi Ka Har Rang...Gulaal	Giga Kaka	Star Plus		
2010	Powder	Naved Ansari	Sony TV		
2015	Maan Na Maan Mein Tera Mehmaan	Dacoit	Disney Channel	Episode 14	
2015–16	Sarojini - Ek Nayi Pehal	Dushyant Singh	Zee TV		
2018–19	Sacred Games	Khanna Guruji	Netflix		
2018–present	Mirzapur	Akhandanand "Kaleen Bhaiya" Tripathi	Amazon Prime Video		
2019	Criminal Justice	Madhav Mishra	Disney+ Hotstar		
2020	Criminal Justice: Behind Closed Doors	Madhav Mishra	Disney+ Hotstar		
2022	Criminal Justice: Adhura Sach	Madhav Mishra	Disney+ Hotstar		
2025	Criminal Justice: A Family Matter	Madhav Mishra	JioHotstar		

== See also ==
- Filmfare Award for Best Supporting Actor
