= 22nd IIFA Awards =

Bollywood film awards

- Date: 3–4 June 2022
- Site: Etihad Arena, Abu Dhabi, United Arab Emirates
- Hosted by: Salman Khan; Riteish Deshmukh; Manish Paul
- Official website: iifa.com/iifa-2022

Highlights
- Best Picture: Shershaah
- Best Direction: Vishnuvardhan (Shershaah)
- Best Actor: Vicky Kaushal (Sardar Udham)
- Best Actress: Kriti Sanon (Mimi)
- Most awards: Shershaah (6)
- Most nominations: Shershaah (13)

Television coverage
- Channel: Colors TV
- Network: Viacom18

The 22nd International Indian Film Academy Awards, also known as the IIFA, was held on 3–4 June 2022, postponed from the original 18–19 March 2022 date, and the 19–21 May 2022 date. Furthermore, it was supposed to be held in 2021, before being postponed a year, along with the 2020 (2021) edition. The awards was held in Abu Dhabi, United Arab Emirates. The nominees were announced in early 2022.

Shershaah led the ceremony with 13 nominations, followed by 83 with 10 nominations and Atrangi Re with 7 nominations.

Shershaah won 6 awards, including Best Film and Best Director (for Vishnuvardhan), thus becoming the most-awarded film at the ceremony.

Pankaj Tripathi received dual nominations for Best Supporting Actor for his performances in 83 and Ludo, winning for the latter.

== Background ==
The awards began in 2000 and the first ceremony was held in London at The Millennium Dome. From then on the awards were held at locations around the world signifying the international success of Bollywood. The 22nd IIFA Awards was supposed to be held in 2021 & 18-19 March 2022 but was postponed to 19-21 May 2022 date due to the surge in COVID-19 cases, it was again postponed to 3–4 June 2022 due to the demise of UAE President & Ruler of Abu Dhabi Sheikh Khalifa bin Zayed Al Nahyan. The IIFA ceremony held in UAE after 16 years (2006) which was held in Dubai.

== Awards ==
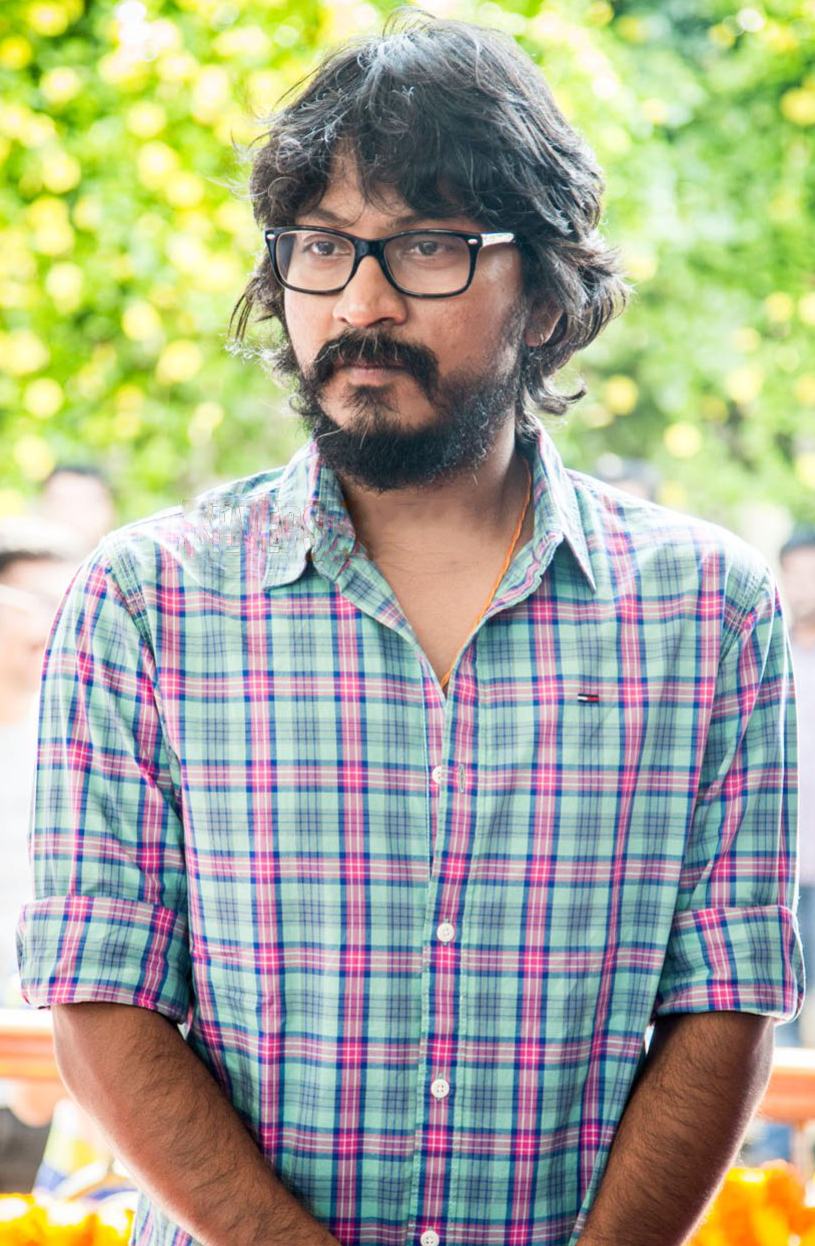
Vishnuvardhan — Best Director

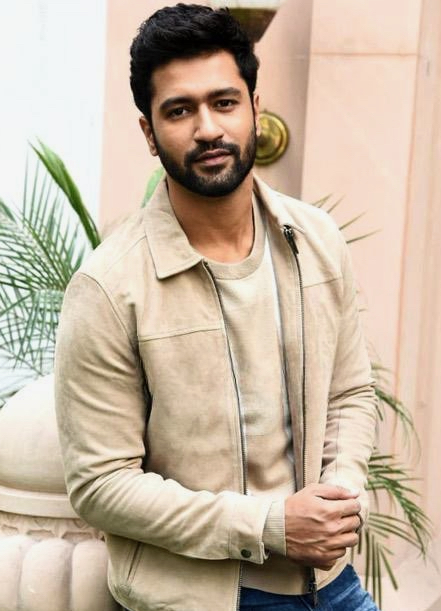
Vicky Kaushal — Best Actor

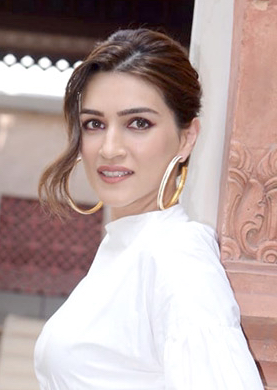
Kriti Sanon — Best Actress

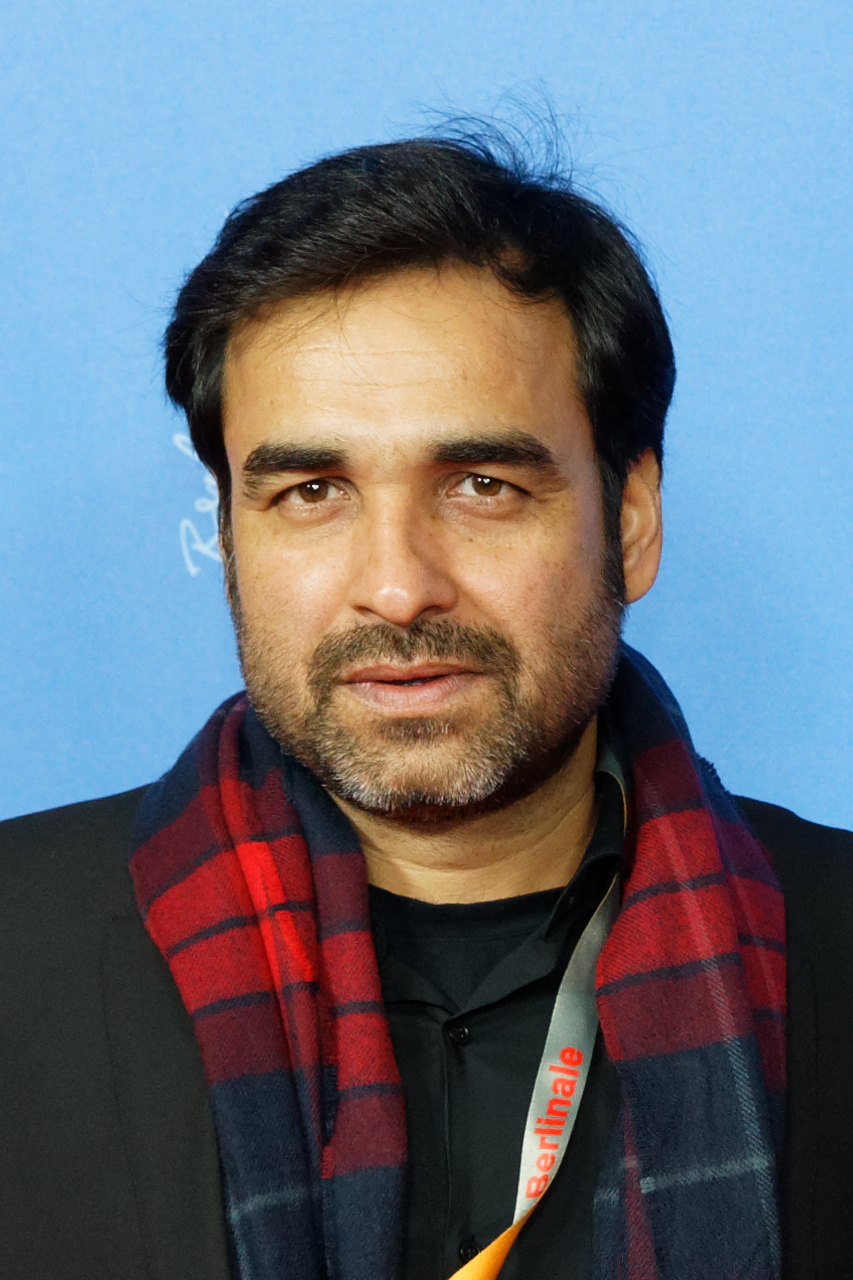
Pankaj Tripathi — Best Supporting Actor

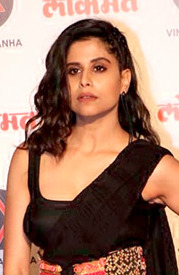
Sai Tamhankar — Best Supporting Actress

The winners and nominees have been listed below. Winners are listed first, highlighted in boldface, and indicated with a double dagger (‡).

=== Popular Awards ===
Best Film	Best Director
**Shershaah**‡; 83; Sardar Udham; Tanhaji: The Unsung Warrior; Thappad; Ludo	**Vishnuvardhan – Shershaah**‡; Anubhav Sinha – Thappad; Anurag Basu – Ludo; Kabir Khan – 83; Shoojit Sircar – Sardar Udham
Best Actor	Best Actress
**Vicky Kaushal – Sardar Udham as Udham Singh**‡; Irrfan Khan – Angrezi Medium as Champak Ghasiteram Bansal; Manoj Bajpayee – Bhonsle as Ganpath Bhonsle; Ranveer Singh – 83 as Kapil Dev; Siddharth Malhotra – Shershaah as Captain Vikram Batra	**Kriti Sanon – Mimi as Mimi Rathod**‡; Kiara Advani – Shershaah as Dimple Cheema; Sanya Malhotra – Pagglait as Sandhya Giri; Taapsee Pannu – Thappad as Amrita Sabharwal; Vidya Balan – Sherni as Vidya Vincent
Best Supporting Actor	Best Supporting Actress
**Pankaj Tripathi – Ludo as Satyendra "Sattu" Tripathi**‡; Jiiva – 83 as Krishnamachari Srikkanth; Kumud Mishra – Thappad as Sachin Sandhu; Pankaj Tripathi – 83 as PR Man Singh; Saif Ali Khan – Tanhaji as Udaybhan Singh Rathore	**Sai Tamhankar – Mimi as Shama**‡; Gauhar Khan – 14 Phere as Zubina; Lara Dutta – Bell Bottom as Indira Gandhi; Radhika Madan – Angrezi Medium as Taarika "Taaru" Bansal; Shalini Vatsa – Ludo as Lata Kutty
Best Debut – Male	Best Debut – Female
**Ahan Shetty – Tadap as Ishana**‡	**Sharvari – Bunty Aur Babli 2 as Sonia Rawat / Jasmine "Jazz" (Fake) / Babli Jr.**‡
Best Music Director	Best Lyricist
**A. R. Rahman – Atrangi Re**‡; **Tanishk Bagchi, Jasleen Royal, Javed-Mohsin, B Praak, Jaani – Shershaah** ‡; A. R. Rahman – 99 Songs; Pritam – 83; Pritam – Ludo	**Kausar Munir – "Lehra Do" – 83**‡; Irshad Kamil – "Rait Zara Si" – Atrangi Re; Irshad Kamil – "Shayad" – Love Aaj Kal 2; Tanishk Bagchi – "Raatan Lambiyaan" – Shershaah; B Praak & Jaani – "Mann Bharrya" – Shershaah
Best Male Playback Singer	Best Female Playback Singer
**Jubin Nautiyal – "Raatan Lambiyaan" – Shershaah**‡; Arijit Singh – "Lehra Do" – 83; Arijit Singh – "Rait Zara Si" – Atrangi Re; Arijit Singh – "Aabaad Barbaad" – Ludo; B Praak – "Mann Bharrya" – Shershaah	**Asees Kaur – "Raatan Lambiyaan" – Shershaah**‡; Jasleen Royal – "Ranjha" – Shershaah; Priya Saraiya – "Kalle Kalle" – Chandigarh Kare Aashiqui; Shreya Ghoshal – "Chaka Chak" – Atrangi Re; Shreya Ghoshal – "Param Sundari" – Mimi

=== Technical Awards ===
Best Story (Original)	Best Story (Adapted)
**Anurag Basu – Ludo**‡; Himanshu Sharma – Atrangi Re; Sandeep Shrivastava – Shershaah; Shubham – Eeb Allay Ooo!	**Kabir Khan, Sanjay Puran Singh Chauhan, Vasan Bala – 83**‡; Abhishek Chaubey, Hussain Haidry – Ankahi Kahaniya; Laxman Utekar, Rohan Shankar – Mimi; Om Raut – Tanhaji; V. Vijayendra Prasad – Thalaivii
Best Screenplay	Best Dialogue
**Sandeep Shrivastava – Shershaah**‡	**Anubhav Sinha, Mrunmayee Lagoo Waikul – Thappad**‡
Best Cinematography	Best Editing
**Avik Mukhopadhyay – Sardar Udham**‡	**Chandrashekhar Prajapati – Sardar Udham**‡
Best Background Score	Best Choreography
**A. R. Rahman – Atrangi Re**‡	**Vijay Ganguly – "Chaka Chak" – Atrangi Re**‡
Best Sound Mixing	Best Sound Design
**Ajay Kumar P.B. & Manik Batra – 83**‡	**Lochan Kanvinde – Tanhaji**‡
Best Special Effects
**NY VFXWAALA – Sardar Udham**‡

== Superlatives ==
Multiple nominations
Nominations	Film
13	Shershaah
10	83
7	Atrangi Re
6	Ludo
6	Sardar Udham
5	Thappad
4	Mimi
4	Tanhaji
2	Angrezi Medium

Multiple wins
Awards	Film
6	Shershaah
4	Sardar Udham
3	83
3	Atrangi Re
2	Mimi
