= 66th Filmfare Awards =

2021 awards for Hindi cinema

- Presented on: 27 March 2021
- Site: Film City, Mumbai
- Hosted by: Rajkummar Rao; Riteish Deshmukh
- Organized by: The Times Group
- Official website: Filmfare Awards 2021

Highlights
- Best Film: Thappad
- Critics Award for Best Film: Eeb Allay Ooo!
- Most awards: Thappad (7)
- Most nominations: Ludo (16)

Television coverage
- Network: Colors TV

The 66th Filmfare Awards ceremony, presented by The Times Group, honored the best Indian Hindi-language films of 2020.

Ludo led the ceremony with 16 nominations each, followed by Thappad with 15 nominations, and Gulabo Sitabo and Tanhaji with 13 nominations each.

Thappad won 7 awards, including Best Film and Best Actress (for Taapsee Pannu), thus becoming the most-awarded film at the ceremony.

Pankaj Tripathi received dual nominations for Best Supporting Actor for his performances in Gunjan Saxena: The Kargil Girl and Ludo, but lost to Saif Ali Khan who the award for Tanhaji.

At age 88, Farrukh Jaffar became the oldest winner of an acting Filmfare Award, winning Best Supporting Actress for her performance in Gulabo Sitabo.

The ceremony was also noted as being the only to have two actors being nominated posthumously for the same award, with Irrfan Khan and Sushant Singh Rajput receiving Best Actor nominations for Angrezi Medium and Dil Bechara, respectively, with Khan winning the award, thus becoming the only actor to win the Filmfare Best Actor award posthumously.

== Winners and nominees ==
On 27 March 2021, the winners were announced. Below is the list of the winners:

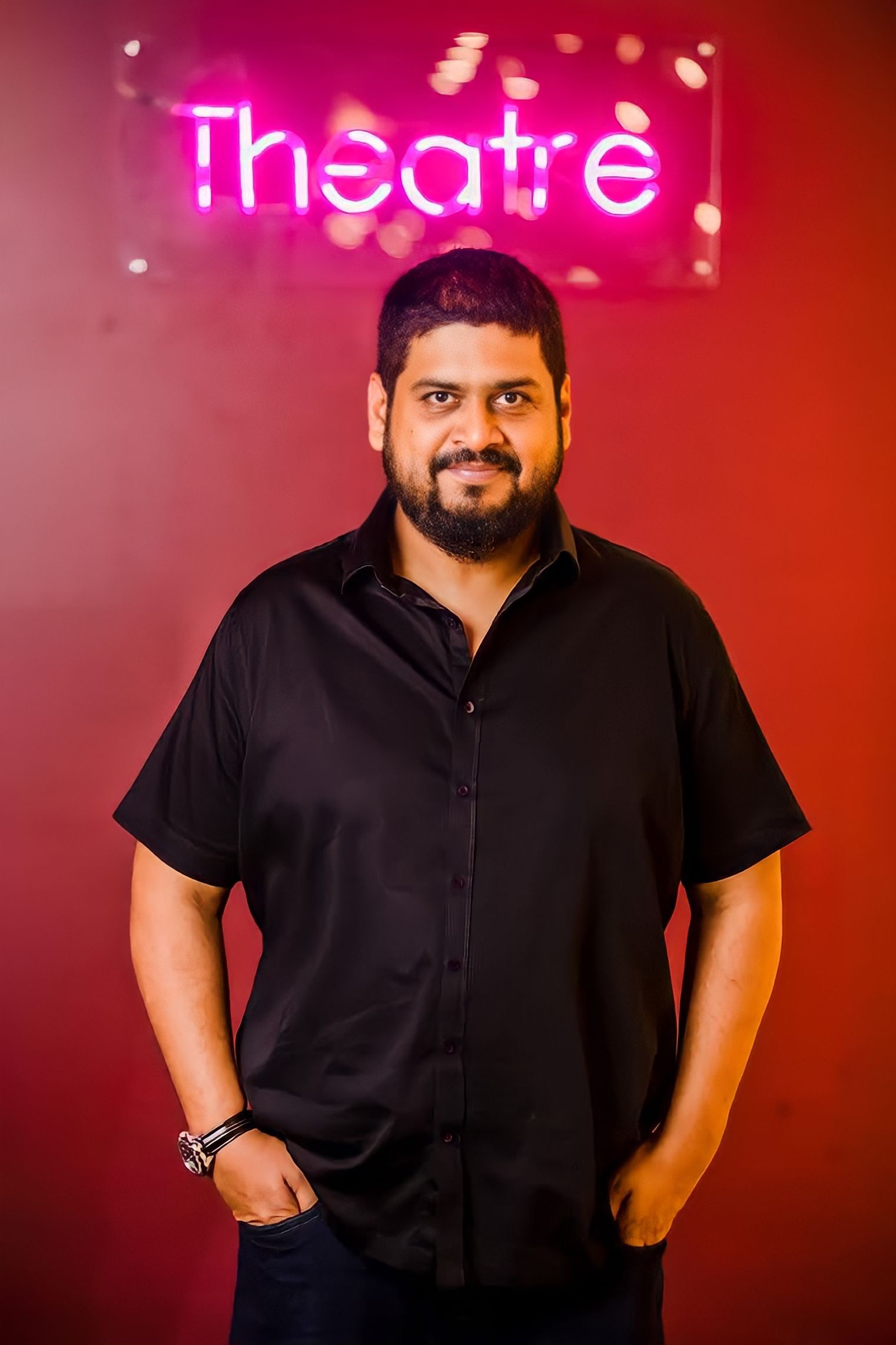
Om Raut, Best Director

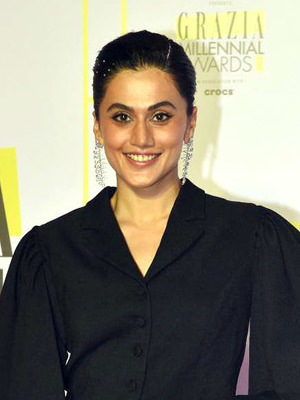
Taapsee Pannu, Best Actress

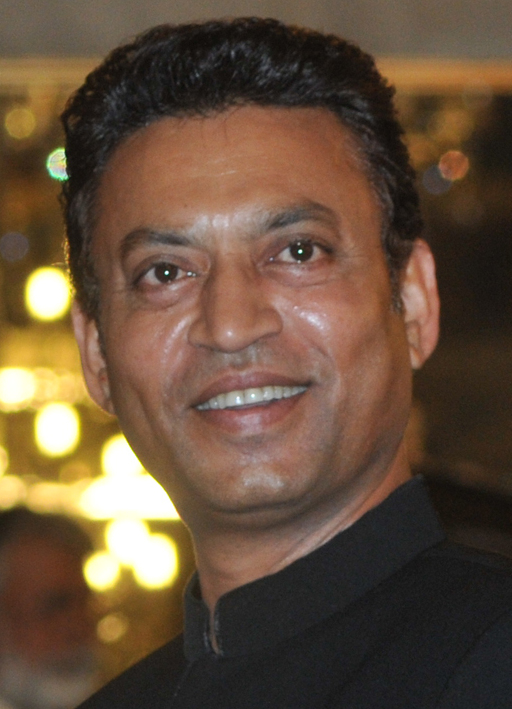
Irrfan Khan Best Actor & Lifetime Achievement Awardee

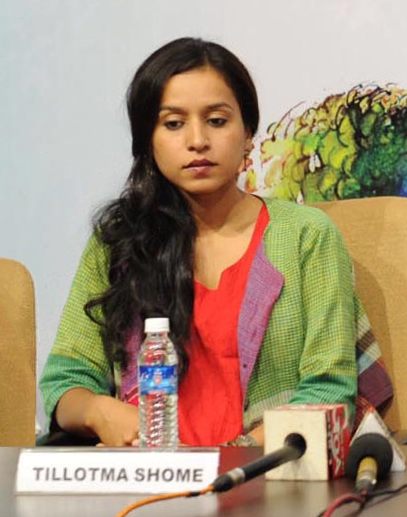
Tillotama Shome, Best Actress Critics

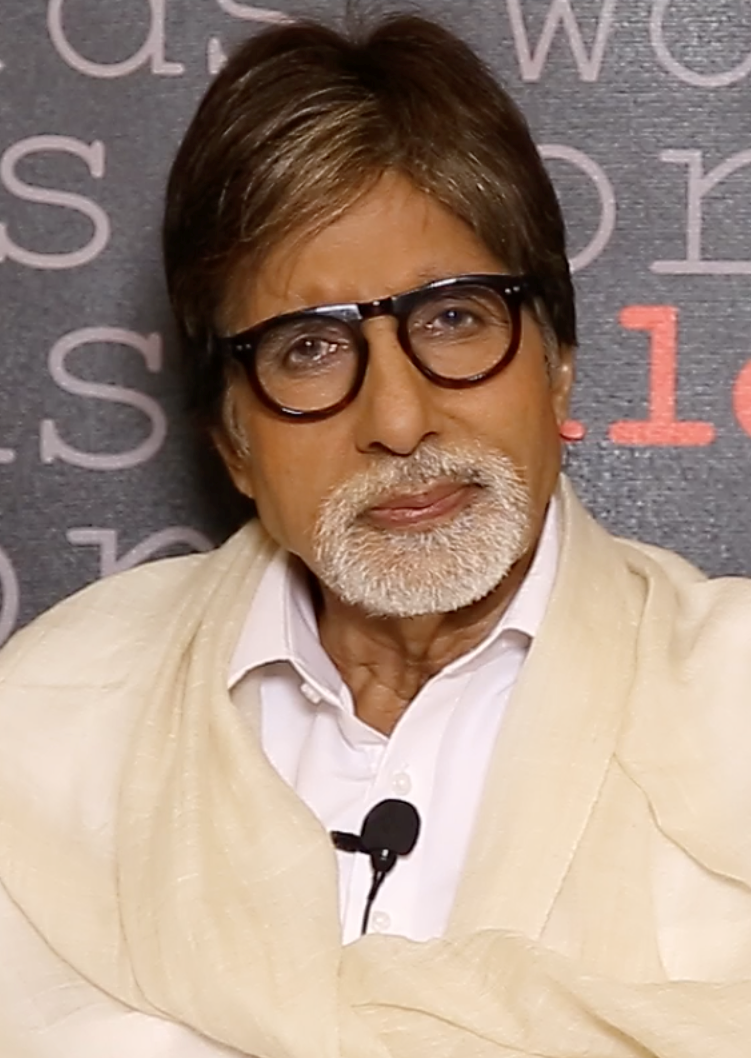
Amitabh Bachchan, Best Actor Critics

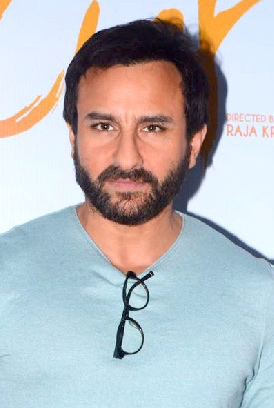
Saif Ali Khan, Best Supporting Actor

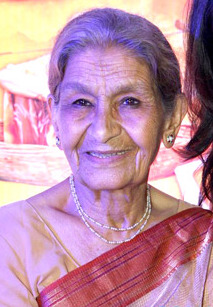
Farrukh Jaffar, Best Supporting Actress

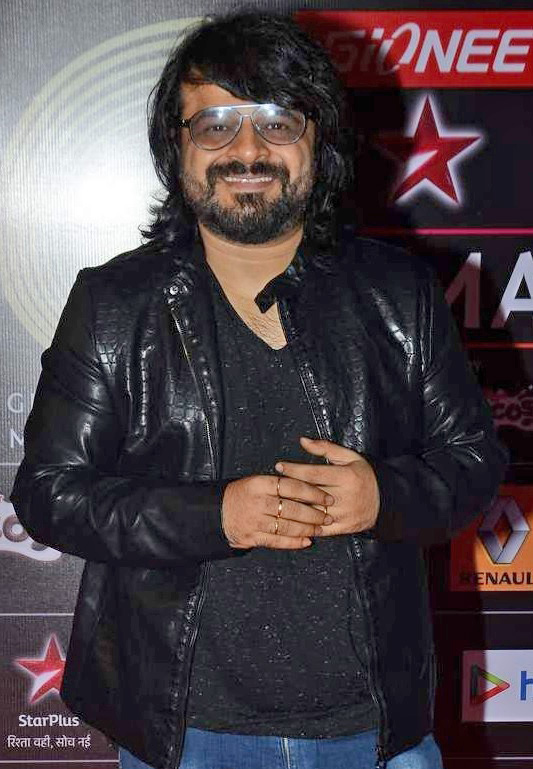
Pritam, Best Music Director

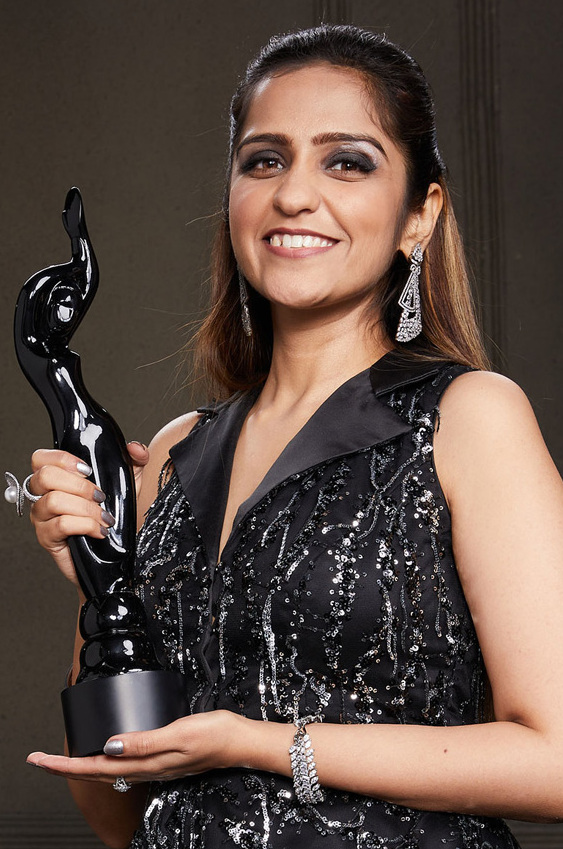
Asees Kaur, Best Female Playback Singer

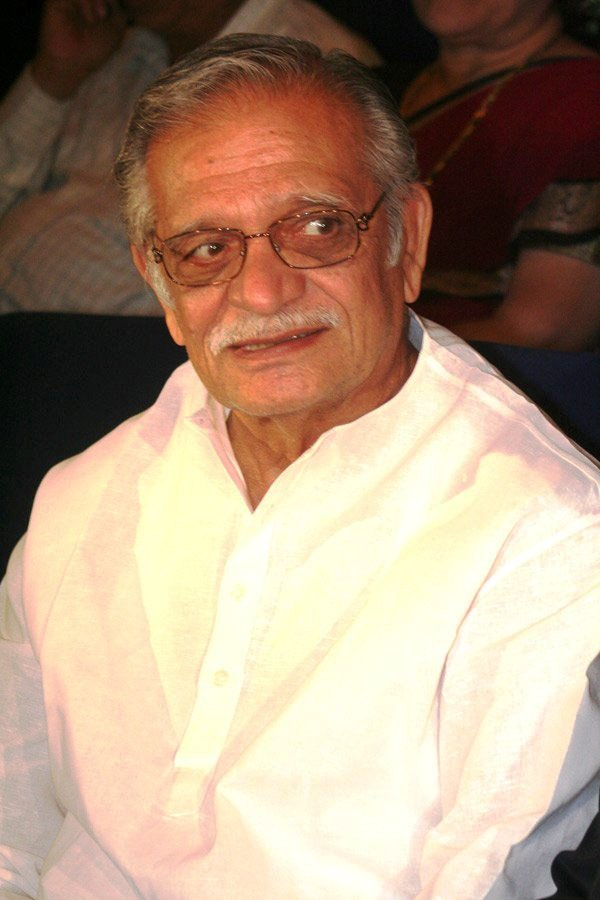
Gulzar, Best Lyricist

=== Popular awards ===
Best Film		Best Director
Thappad – T–Series, Benaras Media Works; Gulabo Sitabo – Ronnie Lahiri, Sheel Kumar, Amazon Prime Video; Gunjan Saxena: The Kargil Girl – Dharma Productions, Zee Studios, Netflix; Ludo – T-Series, Anurag Basu, Netflix; Tanhaji – Ajay Devgn FFilms, T-Series		Om Raut – Tanhaji; Anubhav Sinha – Thappad; Anurag Basu – Ludo; Sharan Sharma – Gunjan Saxena: The Kargil Girl; Shoojit Sircar – Gulabo Sitabo
Best Actor		Best Actress
Irrfan Khan – Angrezi Medium as Champak Ghasiteram Bansal; Ajay Devgn – Tanhaji as Tanaji Malusare; Amitabh Bachchan – Gulabo Sitabo as Chunnan "Mirza" Nawab; Ayushmann Khurrana – Shubh Mangal Zyada Saavdhan as Kartik Singh; Rajkummar Rao – Ludo as Alok "Alu" Kumar Gupta; Sushant Singh Rajput – Dil Bechara as Immanuel "Manny" Rajkumar Junior		Taapsee Pannu – Thappad as Amrita Sabharwal; Deepika Padukone – Chhapaak as Malti; Janhvi Kapoor – Gunjan Saxena: The Kargil Girl as Gunjan Saxena; Kangana Ranaut – Panga as Jaya Nigam; Vidya Balan – Shakuntala Devi as Shakuntala Devi
Best Supporting Actor		Best Supporting Actress
Saif Ali Khan – Tanhaji as Udaybhan Singh Rathore; Deepak Dobriyal – Angrezi Medium as Gopi Ghasiteram Bansal; Gajraj Rao – Shubh Mangal Zyada Saavdhan as Shankar Tripathi; Kumud Mishra – Thappad as Sachin Sandhu; Pankaj Tripathi – Gunjan Saxena: The Kargil Girl as Arup Saxena; Pankaj Tripathi – Ludo as Rahul Satyendra "Sattu" Tripathi		Farrukh Jaffar – Gulabo Sitabo as Fatima Begum; Maanvi Gagroo – Shubh Mangal Zyada Saavdhan as Rajni "Goggle" Tripathi; Neena Gupta – Shubh Mangal Zyada Saavdhan as Sunaina Tripathi; Richa Chadda – Panga as Meenal "Meenu" Singh; Tanvi Azmi – Thappad as Sulakshana Sabharwal
Debut Awards
Best Male Debut	Best Female Debut	Best Debut Director
Not Awarded	Alaya F – Jawaani Jaaneman as Tia Singh; Sadia Khateeb – Shikara	Rajesh Krishnan – Lootcase
Writing Awards
Best Story	Best Screenplay	Best Dialogue
Anubhav Sinha and Mrunmayee Lagoo Waikul – Thappad; Hardik Mehta – Kaamyaab; Juhi Chaturvedi – Gulabo Sitabo; Kapil Sawant and Rajesh Krishnan – Lootcase; Rohena Gera – Sir; Shubham – Eeb Allay Ooo!	Rohena Gera – Sir; Anubhav Sinha and Mrunmayee Lagoo Waikul – Thappad; Anurag Basu – Ludo; Kapil Sawant and Rajesh Krishnan – Lootcase; Prakash Kapadia and Om Raut – Tanhaji	Juhi Chaturvedi – Gulabo Sitabo; Bhavesh Mandalia, Gaurav Shukla, Vinay Chhawal and Sara Bodinar – Angrezi Medium; Kapil Sawant – Lootcase; Prakash Kapadia – Tanhaji; Samrat Chakraborty – Ludo
Music Awards
Best Music Director		Best Lyricist
Pritam – Ludo; A. R. Rahman – Dil Bechara; Mithoon, Ankit Tiwari, Ved Sharma, The Fusion Project, Adnan Dhool and Rabi Ahmed – Malang; Pritam – Love Aaj Kal; Shankar-Ehsaan-Loy – Chhapaak		Gulzar – "Chhapaak" – Chhapaak; Irshad Kamil – "Mehrama" – Love Aaj Kal; Irshad Kamil – "Shayad" – Love Aaj Kal; Sayeed Quadri – "Humdum Hardum" – Ludo; Shakeel Azmi – "Ek Tukda Dhoop" – Thappad; Vayu – "Mere Liye Tum Kaafi Ho" – Shubh Mangal Zyada Saavdhan
Best Playback Singer – Male		Best Playback Singer – Female
Raghav Chaitanya – "Ek Tukda Dhoop" – Thappad; Arijit Singh – "Shayad" – Love Aaj Kal; Arijit Singh – "Aabaad Barbaad" – Ludo; Ayushmann Khurrana – "Mere Liye Tum" – Shubh Mangal Zyada Saavdhan; Darshan Raval – "Mehrama" – Love Aaj Kal; Ved Sharma – "Malang" – Malang		Asees Kaur – "Hui Malang" – Malang; Antara Mitra – "Mehrama" – Love Aaj Kal; Palak Muchhal – "Mann Ki Dori" – Gunjan Saxena: The Kargil Girl; Shraddha Mishra – "Mar Jayein Hum" – Shikara; Sunidhi Chauhan – "Paas Nahi To Fail" – Shakuntala Devi

=== Critics' awards ===
Best Film (Best Director)
Prateek Vats – Eeb Allay Ooo!; Anubhav Sinha – Thappad; Hardik Mehta – Kaamyaab; Rajesh Krishnan – Lootcase; Rohena Gera – Sir; Shoojit Sircar – Gulabo Sitabo
Best Actor	Best Actress
Amitabh Bachchan – Gulabo Sitabo as Chunnan "Mirza" Nawab; Irrfan Khan – Angrezi Medium as Champak Ghasiteram Bansal; Rajkumar Rao – Ludo as Alok "Alu" Kumar Gupta; Sanjay Mishra – Kaamyaab as Sudheer; Shardul Bhardwaj – Eeb Allay Ooo! as Anjani Prasad	Tillotama Shome – Sir as Ratna; Bhumi Pednekar – Dolly Kitty Aur Woh Chamakte Sitare as Kajal "Kitty" Yadav; Konkona Sen Sharma – Dolly Kitty Aur Woh Chamakte Sitare as Radha "Dolly" Yadav; Sanya Malhotra – Ludo as Shruti Choksi; Taapsee Pannu – Thappad as Amrita Sabharwal; Vidya Balan – Shakuntala Devi as Shakuntala Devi

=== Special awards ===
Filmfare Special Award
- Not Awarded
Filmfare Lifetime Achievement Award
- Irrfan Khan
Filmfare R. D. Burman Award
- Not Awarded

=== Technical awards ===
Nominations for the Technical awards were announced on the same day.

Best Editing	Best Production Design	Best Choreography
Yasha Ramchandani – Thappad; Ajay Sharma – Ludo; Anand Subaya – Lootcase; Chandrashekhar Prajapati – Gulabo Sitabo; Jacques Comets, Baptiste Ribrault – Sir	Mansi Mehta – Gulabo Sitabo; Aditya Kanwar – Gunjan Saxena: The Kargil Girl; Anurag Basu – Ludo; Sandeep Meher – Panga; Sriram Kannan Iyengar, Sujeet Sawant – Tanhaji	Farah Khan – "Dil Bechara" – Dil Bechara; Ganesh Acharya – "Bhankas" – Baaghi 3; Ganesh Acharya – "Shankara Re Shankara" – Tanhaji; Kruti Mahesh, Rahul Shetty – "Illegal Weapon" – Street Dancer 3D; Kruti Mahesh, Rahul Shetty – "Nachi Nachi" – Street Dancer 3D
Best Cinematography	Best Sound Design	Best Background Score
Avik Mukhopadhyay – Gulabo Sitabo; Archit Patel, Jay I. Patel – Panga; Keiko Nakahara – Tanhaji; Saumyananda Sahi – Eeb Allay Ooo!; Soumik Mukherjee – Thappad	Kaamod Kharade – Thappad; Abhishek Nair, Shijin Melvin Hutton – Ludo; Ali Merchant – Gunjan Saxena: The Kargil Girl; Bigyna Bhushan Dahal – Eeb Allay Ooo!; Diapankar Jojo Chaki, Nihar Ranjan Samal – Gulabo Sitabo; Lochan Kanvinde – Lootcase	Mangesh Dhakde – Thappad; A. R. Rahman – Dil Bechara; Pritam – Ludo; Sameer Uddin – Lootcase; Sandeep Shirodkar – Tanhaji
Best Costume Design	Best Action	Best Special Effects
Veera Kapur Ee – Gulabo Sitabo; Abilasha Sharma – Chhapaak; Ashish Dwyer – Ludo; Nachiket Barve, Mahesh Sheria – Tanhaji; Niharika Bhasin – Shakuntala Devi	Ramazan Bulut, Rp Yadav – Tanhaji; Ahmed Khan – Baaghi 3; Harpal Singh – Chhalaang; Ivanov Victor, Andreas Nguyen – Khuda Haafiz; Manohar Verma – Lootcase	Prasad Sutar – Tanhaji; Jayesh Vaishnav – Gunjan Saxena: The Kargil Girl; Mahesh Baria – Baaghi 3

=== Short Film awards ===
Best Short Film
Fiction	Non-fiction	People's Choice
Shivraj Waichal – Arjun	Nitesh Ramesh Parulekar – Backyard Wildlife Sanctuary	Priyanka Banerjee – Devi
Best Actor – Male (Short Film)		Best Actor – Female (Short Film)
Arnav Abdagire – Arjun as Arjun		Purti Savardekar – The First Wedding as Bhumi

== Superlatives ==
Multiple nominations
Nominations	Film
16	Ludo
15	Thappad
13	Gulabo Sitabo
13	Tanhaji
8	Gunjan Saxena: The Kargil Girl
8	Lootcase
6	Shubh Mangal Zyada Saavdhan
5	Eeb Allay Ooo!
5	Sir
4	Angrezi Medium
4	Chhapaak
4	Dil Bechara
4	Love Aaj Kal
4	Panga
4	Shakuntala Devi
3	Baaghi 3
2	Dolly Kitty Aur Woh Chamakte Sitare
2	Street Dancer 3D

Multiple wins
Awards	Film
7	Thappad
6	Gulabo Sitabo
4	Tanhaji
2	Sir

== See also ==
- Filmfare Awards
- List of Bollywood films of 2020
