= Raghav Chaitanya =

Indian playback singer

Raghav Chaitanya is an Indian playback singer who got Filmfare Award for Best Male Playback Singer at 66th Filmfare Awards for the song "Ek Tukda Dhoop" from Thappad. He is the youngest artist to win Filmfare Award for Best Male Playback Singer.

In 2022, he gained further recognition with the song "Dil" from Ek Villain Returns. Chaitanya also sang "Tujhse Pyaar Karta Hoon" from Freddy, composed by Pritam and lyrics written by Irshad Kamil. In 2023, he sang "Hua Main" along with its dubbed version in four the other languages from Animal. In 2024, he sung for a number a movies including the chartbuster "Tum Se" from Teri Baaton Mein Aisa Uljha Jiya. "Dil Ka Kya" from Metro... In Dino in 2025, earned him further critical acclaim and recognition.

== Discography ==
=== Film songs ===
Year	Film	Song	Co-Singer(s)	Lyrics	Composer	Notes
2020	Thappad	"Ek Tukda Dhoop"	Solo	Shakeel Azmi	Anurag Saikia	Won - Filmfare Award for Best Male Playback Singer
2021	83	"Uth Ja Ziddi"	Solo	Prashant Ingole	Pritam	
2022	Ek Villain Returns	"Dil"	Solo	Kunaal Verma	JAM8 (Kaushik-Guddu)	
2022	Atithi Bhooto Bhava	"Udd Raha Hai Dil"	Aditi Singh Sharma	Shakeel Azmi	Prasad S.	Zee5 film
2022	Freddy	"Tujhse Pyaar Karta Hoon"	Solo	Irshad Kamil	Pritam	Disney Plus Hotstar film
2023	Animal	"Hua Main"	Pritam	Manoj Muntashir	JAM8, Pritam	
2023	Animal	"Ammayi"	Pritam	Anantha Sriram	JAM8, Pritam	Telugu Dub
2023	Animal	"Nee Vaadi"	Pritam	Mohan Rajan	JAM8, Pritam	Tamil Dub
2023	Animal	"Pennaale"	Pritam	Mankombu Gopalakrishnan	JAM8, Pritam	Malayalam Dub
2023	Animal	"Oh Baale"	Pritam	Varadaraj Chikkaballapura	JAM8, Pritam	Kannada Dub
2024	Teri Baaton Mein Aisa Uljha Jiya	"Tum Se"	Varun Jain	Indraneel	Sachin-Jigar	
2024	The Family Star	"Nandanandanaa"	Solo	Rashmi Virag	Gopi Sundar	Hindi Dub
2024	Dedh Bigha Zameen	"Chota Sa Mann"	Anurag Saikia, Ritrisha Sharmah	Rashmi Virag	Anurag Saikia	JioCinema film
2024	Ghudchadi	"Dil Vasda"	Tulsi Kumar	Tanishk Bagchi		JioCinema film
2024	Vedaa	"Dhaage"	Solo	Raghav-Arjun		
2024	Vicky Vidya Ka Woh Wala Video	"Marjaaniya 2"	Solo	Priya Saraiya	Sachin–Jigar	
2025	Jewel Thief	"Jaadu"	OAFF & Savera	Kumaar	OAFF & Savera	Netflix film
2025	Jewel Thief	"Jewel Thief - Title Track"	Shilpa Rao	Soundtrek–Anis Ali Sabri		Netflix film
2025	Bhool Chuk Maaf	"Sawariya Tera"	Varun Jain, Suvarna Tiwari, Pravesh Mallick, Priyanka Sarkaar	Irshad Kamil	Tanishk Bagchi	
2025	Metro... In Dino	"Dil Ka Kya"	Solo	Anurag Sharma	Pritam	Side A
2025	Metro... In Dino	"Mann Ye Mera (Rewind)"	Solo	Neelesh Misra	Pritam	Side A
2025	Metro... In Dino	"Hote Tak (Reprise)"	Shilpa Rao	Ghalib, Sandeep Shrivastava	Pritam	Side B
2025	Metro... In Dino	"Das Haasil Sau Baaki"	Neeti Mohan	Sandeep Srivastava	Pritam	Side B
2025	Kaalidhar Laapata	"Dil Banjaara"	Solo	Geet Sagar	Amit Trivedi	Zee5 film
2025	War 2	"Tripping High"	Tsumyoki, Poorvi Koutish, Brianna Supriyo, RANJ, Saaj Bhatt, Shreya Phukan, Dev Arijit	Tsumyoki, Brianna Supriyo, RANJ, Shreya Phukan	Pritam	Hindi version
2025	War 2	"Tripping High"	Tsumyoki, Poorvi Koutish, Brianna Supriyo, RANJ, Saaj Bhatt, Shreya Phukan, Dev Arijit	Tsumyoki, Brianna Supriyo, RANJ, Shreya Phukan	Pritam	Telugu dubbed version
2025	War 2	"Tripping High"	Tsumyoki, Poorvi Koutish, Brianna Supriyo, RANJ, Saaj Bhatt, Shreya Phukan, Dev Arijit	Tsumyoki, Brianna Supriyo, RANJ, Shreya Phukan	Pritam	Tamil dubbed version
2025	Abir Gulaal	"On The Way"	Akanksha Sethi	Kumaar	Amit Trivedi	
2025	Love in Vietnam	"Teri Pehli Nazar"	Solo	Kunaal Vermaa	Devv Sadaana	

=== Non-film songs ===
Year	Song	Co-singer(s)	Composer	Lyrics	Note
2019	"Oh Teri!"		Himself	Himself	First single
2020	"Maangi Duaein"		Salim-Sulaiman	Shradha Pandit	
2020	"Baatein"		Himself	Himself	
2020	"Lamhe"		Himself	Himself	
2020	"Gustakhiyaan"		Anurag Saikia	Ritrisha Sarmah	
2020	"Parwah"		Himself	Himself	
2020	"Anjaana"		Himself	Himself	
2021	"Dooriyan"		Anurag Saikia	Kunaal Verma	
2021	"Faasle"		Himself	Himself	
2021	"Karoon bhi kya?"		Himself	Himself	
2021	"Tere Bin"		Himself	Himself	
2022	"Jaane De"		The Rish	Kaushal Kishore	
2022	"Mera Dil"		Himself, Darpan, Charanpreet Singh	Himself, Somanshu, Charanpreet Singh	
2023	"Subah Ko"		Himself	Rashmi Virag	
2023	"Khaamoshi"		Himself	Himself	
2023	"Sun Liya"		Himself	Himself	
2023	"Khoobsurat"	Neha Kakkar	Rohanpreet Singh	Rana Sotal	First duet song
2023	"Mujhse Mil"		Himself	Rashmi Virag	

== Filmography ==
- Metro... In Dino (2025)
