= Angrezi Medium =

2020 Indian film by Homi Adajania

- Theatrical release poster
- Directed by: Homi Adajania
- Written by: Bhavesh Mandalia; Gaurav Shukla; Vinay Chhawall; Sara Bodinar
- Produced by: Dinesh Vijan; Jyoti Deshpande
- Starring: Irrfan Khan; Radhika Madan; Deepak Dobriyal; Kareena Kapoor Khan
- Cinematography: Anil Mehta
- Edited by: A. Sreekar Prasad
- Music by: Score & Songs: Sachin–Jigar; Guest Composer: Tanishk Bagchi
- Production companies: Maddock Films; London Calling Production
- Distributed by: Pen India Limited; Jio Studios
- Release date: 13 March 2020
- Running time: 145 minutes
- Country: India
- Language: Hindi
- Budget: ₹36 crore Note: figure includes print and advertising costs.
- Box office: est. ₹13.54 crore

Angrezi Medium (transl. English Medium) is a 2020 Indian Hindi-language comedy drama film directed by Homi Adajania and produced under the production banner Maddock Films. A standalone sequel to the 2017 film Hindi Medium, the film stars Irrfan Khan, Radhika Madan, Deepak Dobriyal and Kareena Kapoor Khan. Filming began in Udaipur on 5 April 2019 and was completed by July in London. This was Irrfan Khan’s final film to be released before his death on 29 April 2020.

The film was theatrically released in India on 13 March 2020. With its theatrical performance affected by the closing of cinemas due to the COVID-19 pandemic, plans for a re-release were cancelled and the film was made available digitally less than a month after its release on Disney+ Hotstar.

== Plot ==
Champak Bansal is a widower and a sweet-shop owner in Udaipur, Rajasthan. He often fights with his half-brother Gopi, who runs a competing sweet-shop, but they're greatly fond of each other.

Champak's daughter Tarika has always harboured a dream to travel and study abroad. Though she is poor in studies, Champak is strongly supportive of her dream, and, with some effort, she secures a high rank in her final school examinations, enough for her to secure a scholarship from London's Truford University, which has partnered with her school.

On the school's Annual Day, Champak notices that the chief guest is Judge Chheda, who had accepted a watch as a bribe from Gopi a few days before so that he could win the rights to the Ghasiteram name. He goes on stage and exposes the judge who had emphasised honesty and values in his speech, not knowing that he is the principal's husband. The following morning, he meets the principal at her home and asks for forgiveness, only for her to tear Tarika's scholarship letter to pieces and throw it at his face. He vows to send Tarika to London, come what may.

With the help of a London-based acquaintance, Bablu, Champak and Tarika along with Gopi proceed to London so that Tarika can find accommodation there till college opens. However, Champak and Gopi are caught and interrogated by the airport police. When they inadvertently say that they have 'drugs', they are deported and their passports blacklisted. Tarika, who had been calling Champak, Gopi and Bablu to no avail, goes to a rented home, and starts enjoying the free-spirited London life while also trying to fund her education. Meanwhile, Champak and Gopi are referred to a fixer in Dubai, Tony, who gives them Pakistani aliases and forged passports. They return to London, under the names of Abdul Razzaq and Saqlain Mushtaq, and are briefly accosted by Naina, a cop. They find lodging in a house owned by Mrs. Kohli, who is Naina's estranged mother.

When they meet Tarika, Champak is aghast at her lifestyle, and demands that she leave her lodgings or he will sever ties with her. Gopi asks him why he says so, to which he replies that this is in order to avoid getting caught by Naina. The two visit a police station, where Bablu is lodged; they pay for his bail, and he tells them that he is now penniless. One night, Mrs. Kohli has invited the Bansals for dinner on the eve of her birthday, when Naina suddenly barges in and says that since her mother has not cared for her, she can do whatever she wants. The next day, Champak and Gopi find the senior Kohli unconscious on the floor, and rush her to the hospital, narrowly saving her life. When Naina arrives on the scene, she breaks down and realises the value of caring for her.

Champak, Gopi and Bablu hear of a fundraiser organised by Truford University and reluctantly agree to bid for its renovation, which costs 300,000 pounds. At their wits' end for arranging for such a large sum, they agree to sell the Ghasiteram family name. When Champak tells Tarika the news, she is nonplussed. The next day, as the three go to a scrapyard to collect the money, Champak pours his entire story to Tarika, who is convinced that she should not have put him and Gopi through so much trouble to fulfil her dream. Tarika later decides to give up her London scholarship and study back home in Udaipur, to which everyone agrees. The film ends with Champak and Gopi making peace over the Ghasiteram name.

== Cast ==
- Irrfan Khan as Champak Ghasiteram Bansal
- Radhika Madan as Taarika "Taaru" Bansal
  - Myrah Dandekar as Little Taarika
- Himanshu N Awasthie as Ankit
- Deepak Dobriyal as Gopi Ghasiteram Bansal
- Kareena Kapoor Khan as Inspector Naina Kohli
- Dimple Kapadia as Sampada Kohli
- Ranvir Shorey as Bala "Babloo" Shankar Tripathi
- Pankaj Tripathi as Travel Agent Tony
- Kiku Sharda as Gajendra "Gajju" Ghasiteram Bansal
- Manu Rishi as Bheluram Bansal
- Zakir Hussain as Judge Indrabhan Chedda
- Meghna Malik as Principal Maalti Chedda
- Manish Gandhi as Advait Raheja, Taarika's London friend
- Tillotama Shome as College Consultant of Tarika
- Poorvi Jain as Rashi Bansal
- Vipul Tank as Lagnesh
- Ankit Bisht as Anmol

== Production ==
In June 2017 in an interview after the success of his film Hindi Medium producer Dinesh Vijan told Mid-Day, "There is definitely scope for a sequel. We would certainly explore it." Vijan added, "It's too early. Also, I still have to talk to director Saket Chaudhary, who is currently working on another movie project." On 24 January 2018, Vijan confirmed the sequel to Times Now. He said, "We have just finished typing the second part", with "Just finishing touches are being put", however, "I think you will have to wait for an official announcement for that." On 30 March 2019, it was reported that Kareena Kapoor Khan had been added to the cast of the film and filming would start from April. The sequel was titled as Angrezi Medium and filming began on 5 April 2019 in Udaipur. On 6 April 2019 Taran Adarsh, the trade analyst introduced the characters of the film as, Deepak Dobriyal plays Khan's brother and Manu Rishi their cousin, all are running mithai shops and are rivals in business. Pankaj Tripathi joined the cast as travel agent Tony. Jaipur actor Poorvi Jain played Irrfan's wife Rashi. In mid July, director of the film Homi Adajania announced the completion of filming on his Twitter account.

== Soundtrack ==
Angrezi Medium

Soundtrack album by Sachin–Jigar and Tanishk Bagchi
- Released: 16 March 2020
- Recorded: 2019
- Genre: Feature film soundtrack
- Length: 11:42
- Language: Hindi
- Label: T-Series

This film's soundtrack is composed by Sachin–Jigar and Tanishk Bagchi. with lyrics written by Jigar Saraiya, Tanishk Bagchi and Priya Saraiya.

The song Ek Zindagi is the remake of Ik Jindari, a song originally composed by Sachin–Jigar for the previous film Hindi Medium.

The song Nachan Nu Jee Karda is the remake of popular Bhangra number Nachna Onda Nahin after Tum Bin 2.

The song Laadki is the remake of the song, originally composed by Sachin–Jigar in the voice of Tanishkaa Sanghvi, Rekha Bhardwaj and Kirtidan Gadhvi.

The song Kudi Nu Nachne De is a song celebrating women power. The song features a number of Bollywood actresses- Anushka Sharma, Katrina Kaif, Alia Bhatt, Janhvi Kapoor, Ananya Panday, Kriti Sanon and Kiara Advani.

Track listing
No.	Title	Lyrics	Music	Singer(s)	Length
1.	"Ek Zindagi"	Jigar Saraiya	Sachin–Jigar	Tanishkaa Sanghvi, Sachin–Jigar	2:50
2.	"Nachan Nu Jee Karda"	Tanishk Bagchi	Tanishk Bagchi	Romy, Nikhita Gandhi	2:48
3.	"Kudi Nu Nachne De"	Priya Saraiya	Sachin–Jigar	Vishal Dadlani, Sachin–Jigar	2:52
4.	"Laadki"	Priya Saraiya	Sachin–Jigar	Rekha Bhardwaj, Sachin–Jigar	3:12
Total length:					11:42

== Marketing and release ==
On 12 February 2020 Irrfan Khan shared an emotional message for his fans that he wouldn't be able to promote the film due to neuroendocrine cancer. The next day, the official trailer for the film was launched by Maddock Films.

The film was released in India theatrically on 13 March 2020 and digitally on Disney+ Hotstar on 6 April 2020.

== Reception ==
=== Critical reception ===
On the review aggregator website Rotten Tomatoes, 46% of 13 critics' reviews are positive, with an average rating of 5.6/10.

=== Box office ===
Angrezi Medium earned ₹4.03 crore net at the domestic box office on the first day. On the second day, the film collected ₹2.75 crore. On third day, the film collected ₹2.25 crore, taking total opening weekend collection to ₹9.03 crore.

As of 15 March 2020, with a gross of ₹10.75 crore in India and ₹2.40 crore overseas, the film has a worldwide gross collection of ₹13.54 crore. The film was moved out of theaters as all theaters and cinema halls were closed due to COVID-19 pandemic on 24 March 2020. Furthermore, the film was released on Disney+ Hotstar.

== Accolades ==
Award (Note: Awards, festivals and organizations are in alphabetical order.)	Date of ceremony (Note: Date is linked to the article about the awards held that year, wherever possible.)	Category	Recipient(s)	Result	Ref.
Filmfare Awards	27 March 2021	Best Actor	Irrfan Khan	Won	
Filmfare Awards	27 March 2021	Critics Award for Best Actor	Irrfan Khan	Nominated	
Filmfare Awards	27 March 2021	Best Supporting Actor	Deepak Dobriyal	Nominated	
Filmfare Awards	27 March 2021	Best Dialogue	Bhavesh Mandalia, Gaurav Shukla, Vinay Chhawal and Sara Bodinar	Nominated	
