= Thappad =

2020 Hindi-language drama film by Anubhav Sinha

- Theatrical release poster
- Directed by: Anubhav Sinha
- Written by: Anubhav Sinha Mrunmayee Lagoo Waikul
- Produced by: Bhushan Kumar; Krishan Kumar; Anubhav Sinha
- Starring: Taapsee Pannu; Pavail Gulati
- Cinematography: Soumik Mukherjee
- Edited by: Yasha Ramchandani
- Music by: Songs: Anurag Saikia; Background Score: Mangesh Dhakde
- Production companies: Benaras Media Works; T-Series
- Distributed by: AA Films
- Release date: 28 February 2020
- Running time: 142 minutes
- Country: India
- Language: Hindi
- Budget: ₹24 crore
- Box office: ₹44.54 crore

Thappad (transl. Slap) is a 2020 Indian Hindi-language drama film directed and co-written by Anubhav Sinha, starring Taapsee Pannu and Pavail Gulati. The film released theatrically on 28 February 2020. This film received positive reviews from both critics and audience.

At the 66th Filmfare Awards, Thappad received 15 nominations, including Best Director (Sinha), Best Supporting Actor (Mishra) and Best Supporting Actress (Azmi), and won a leading 7 awards, including Best Film and Best Actress (Pannu).

== Plot ==
Amrita Sandhu and Vikram Sabharwal are happily married. Amrita is a homemaker, looking after her husband and the house. During a party to celebrate his promotion, Vikram learns that his promotion has been compromised for his inexperienced junior, who is a relative of his boss. Angered, he gets into an argument with his superior, Rajhans. When Amrita tries to break up the argument since all guests are watching, Vikram slaps her publicly. The incident leaves her shaken and opens her eyes to all the little unfair things in her marriage she had previously ignored. Amrita realizes that a husband who respects her wouldn't slap her. Moreover, Vikram refuses to take accountability or apologize for his actions.

Unable to "forget it and move on", as everyone advises her to do, Amrita leaves for her parents' home and files for divorce. This shocks her family. She makes no claims for alimony; her stand is simply that Vikram has no right to hit her and that the slap made her realize she was getting neither respect nor happiness.

Things get complicated when Amrita discovers she is pregnant. Vikram and his lawyer play dirty, making false claims against her to get sole custody of the unborn child. Hurt, Amrita decides to file a domestic violence charge unless he agrees to a divorce and joint custody of the child. Vikram settles for the divorce. Meanwhile, his boss informs him that he is getting the promotion after all. Rajhans congratulates Vikram and sympathizes for happening at his home-front. However, he also points out that that night, it was completely Vikram’s fault; though angry over his denied promotion, Vikram did not slap Rajhans, who he was actually arguing with, but Amrita, and that attitude is toxic.

Amrita speaks to her mother-in-law Sulakshana in the presence of both their families, explaining that on the night Vikram slapped her, nobody in the family asked once if she was okay; they did not hold Vikram accountable, tell him he was wrong, or advise him to apologise. The only thing she was told was to endure it to keep the peace. Sulakshana apologises, acknowledging their misogyny, and says Amrita is doing the right thing.

When Amrita and Vikram meet in court to finalise their divorce, Vikram apologises to her for the first time. He says he rejected the promotion and quit his job, and will try to be someone who deserves her. The two finalize their divorce and part ways with a sense of renewed hope.

== Cast ==
- Taapsee Pannu as Amrita "Amu" Sabharwal (née Sandhu)
- Pavail Gulati as Vikram Sabharwal, Amrita's husband
- Dia Mirza as Shivani Fonseca, Amrita's friend; Vikram's neighbour
- Maya Sarao as Advocate Netra Jaisingh
- Geetika Vidya Ohlyan as Sunita
- Kumud Mishra as Sachin Sandhu, Amrita's father
- Ratna Pathak Shah as Sandhya Sandhu, Amrita's mother
- Tanvi Azmi as Sulakshana Sabharwal, Vikram's mother
- Ram Kapoor as Advocate Pramod Gujral, Vikram's Lawyer
- Naila Grrewal as Swati Sandhu, Karan's fiancé
- Ankur Rathee as Karan Sandhu, Amrita's brother
- Sushil Dahiya as Romesh Sabharwal, Vikram's father
- Nidhi Uttam as Kavita Sabharwal, Vikram's sister-in-law
- Siddhant Karnick as Viraj Sabharwal, Vikram's brother
- Manav Kaul as Rohit Jaisingh, Netra's husband
- Gracy Goswami as Sania Fonseca
- Rohan Khurana as Priyan
- Shantanu Ghatak as Subodh
- Harssh A. Singh as Rajhans Jetley
- Purnendu Bhattacharya as Thapar
- Anil Rastogi as Justice Jaisingh, Netra's father-in-law
- Mritunjoy Dev Nath as actor

== Production ==
Principal photography began on 6 September 2019 and ended on 16 October. The film was shot in various places of Uttar Pradesh mainly at Shalimar Paradise, Barabanki and other locations in Lucknow.

== Promotion and release ==
The film was initially set for release on 6 March 2020, but was moved a week earlier to 28 February 2020 in order to avoid clashing with Baaghi 3, a big commercial release.

On 11 February, a second trailer was released which showed Pannu breaking the fourth wall and asking viewers to report the video so that it gets blocked on YouTube.

== Reception ==
=== Critical response ===
Praise about the film was focused on its social message, screenplay, direction and performances, but was criticized for its pacing. On the review aggregator website Rotten Tomatoes, 94% of 16 critics' reviews are positive, with an average rating of 7.9/10.

=== Box office ===
Thappad earned ₹2.76 crore net at the domestic box office on the first day. On the second day, the film collected ₹5.05 crore. On the third day, the film collected ₹5.76 crore taking total opening weekend collection to ₹13.57 crore.

As of 19 March 2020, with a gross of ₹36.44 crore in India and ₹8.10 crore overseas, the film has a worldwide gross collection of ₹44.54 crore.

== Accolades ==
Award	Date of ceremony	Category	Recipient(s)	Result	Ref.
AACTA Awards	30 November 2020	Best Asian Film	Anubhav Sinha, Bhushan Kumar and Krishan Kumar	Nominated	
Asian Film Awards	28 October 2020	Best Film	Thappad	Nominated	
Asian Film Awards	28 October 2020	Best Editing	Yasha Ramchandani	Nominated	
International Indian Film Academy Awards	4 June 2022	Best Film	Bhushan Kumar, Krishan Kumar and Anubhav Sinha	Nominated	
International Indian Film Academy Awards	4 June 2022	Best Director	Anubhav Sinha	Nominated	
International Indian Film Academy Awards	4 June 2022	Best Actress	Taapsee Pannu	Nominated	
International Indian Film Academy Awards	4 June 2022	Best Supporting Actor	Kumud Mishra	Nominated	
Filmfare Awards	11 April 2021	Best Film	Anubhav Sinha, Bhushan Kumar and Krishan Kumar	Won	
Filmfare Awards	11 April 2021	Best Film (Critics)	Anubhav Sinha	Nominated	
Filmfare Awards	11 April 2021	Best Director	Anubhav Sinha	Nominated	
Filmfare Awards	11 April 2021	Best Story	Anubhav Sinha and Mrunmayee Lagoo Waikul	Won	
Filmfare Awards	11 April 2021	Best Screenplay	Anubhav Sinha and Mrunmayee Lagoo Waikul	Nominated	
Filmfare Awards	11 April 2021	Best Actress	Taapsee Pannu	Won	
Filmfare Awards	11 April 2021	Best Actress (Critics)	Taapsee Pannu	Nominated	
Filmfare Awards	11 April 2021	Best Supporting Actor	Kumud Mishra	Nominated	
Filmfare Awards	11 April 2021	Best Supporting Actress	Tanvi Azmi	Nominated	
Filmfare Awards	11 April 2021	Best Lyricist	Shakeel Azmi for "Ek Tukda Dhoop"	Nominated	
Filmfare Awards	11 April 2021	Best Male Playback Singer	Raghav Chaitanya for "Ek Tukda Dhoop"	Won	
Filmfare Awards	11 April 2021	Best Editing	Yasha Ramchandani	Won	
Filmfare Awards	11 April 2021	Best Background Score	Mangesh Dhakde	Won	
Filmfare Awards	11 April 2021	Best Cinematography	Soumik Mukherjee	Nominated	
Filmfare Awards	11 April 2021	Best Sound Design	Kaamod Kharade	Won	

== Soundtrack ==
Thappad

Soundtrack album by Anurag Saikia
- Released: 29 February 2020
- Recorded: 2019
- Genre: Feature film soundtrack
- Length: 14:14
- Language: Hindi
- Label: T-Series
External audio
- Official Audio Jukebox on YouTube

The film's songs are composed by Anurag Saikia and lyrics written by Shakeel Azmi and Sanah Moidutty. Additional verses of the song 'Ek Tukda Dhoop' appear only in the movie and these are not officially released in any of the digital platforms.

The song Hayo Rabba is the recreation of Pakistani folk singer Reshma's old song Hai O Rabba Nahion Lagda Dil Mera.

Track listing
No.	Title	Singer(s)	Length
1.	"Ek Tukda Dhoop"	Raghav Chaitanya	5:25
2.	"Dancing In The Sun"	Sharvi Yadav	3:49
3.	"Hayo Rabba"	Suvarna Tiwari	5:02
Total length:			14:14

== Home media ==
The film was made available to stream on OTT platform Amazon Prime Video on 1 May 2020.

== Impact ==
Followіng the fіlm's release, Rajasthan Police shared a poster of the film with the helpline number to report domestic violence.
