= Gunjan Saxena =

Indian Air Force officer

Flight Lieutenant Gunjan Saxena
- गुंजन सक्सेना
- Born: August 1974 (age 52)/1975 (age 50–51)
- Education: Hansraj College; Delhi University
- Military career
- Allegiance: India
- Branch: Indian Air Force
- Service years: 1994–2004
- Rank: Flight Lieutenant
- Conflicts: Kargil War

Gunjan Saxena (born 1975) (Note: Per her autobiography she was born in August 1974.) is an Indian Air Force officer and former helicopter pilot. She joined the IAF in 1994 and is a 1999 Kargil War veteran. She is the first woman to fly in a combat zone during the Kargil War. One of her main roles during the Kargil War was to evacuate the wounded from Kargil, transport supplies, and assist in surveillance. She would go on to be part of operations to evacuate over 900 troops, both injured and deceased, from Kargil. In 2004, after serving as a pilot for eight years, her career as a helicopter pilot ended; permanent commissions for women were not available during her time.

The movie, Gunjan Saxena: The Kargil Girl was released in 2020 by Dharma Productions. Her autobiography, The Kargil Girl, was released along with the movie by Penguin Publishers, which she had co-written with author-duo Kiran Nirvan.

== Early life ==
Saxena was born into an Army family. Her father Lieutenant Colonel Anup Kumar Saxena and brother Lieutenant Colonel Anshuman both served in the Indian Army. Saxena went to study anthropology at Hansraj College, University of Delhi, but ultimately graduated with a Bachelor of Science degree in physics.

== Indian Air Force service ==
Saxena joined the Indian Air Force (IAF) in 1994, and was one of 26 women who became pilots in 1996. This was the fourth batch of women air force trainees for the IAF. Saxena's first posting was in Udhampur, as part of the 132 Forward Area Control as a Flying officer.

Flying officer Saxena was 24 years old when she flew during the Kargil War and was stationed in Srinagar. In the Kargil War, as part of Operation Vijay, apart from evacuating the wounded, (Note: Indian official figures for Indians killed in the Kargil War is 527.) she helped transport supplies to troops in the forward areas of Dras and Batalik. She also was assigned to conduct surveillance, such as mapping enemy positions. She had to deal with makeshift landing grounds, heights of 13,000 to 18,000 feet and enemy fire. She was one of the ten pilots based in Srinagar who flew hundreds of sorties during the war, evacuating over 900 casualties, wounded and killed. Saxena was the only woman in the Indian Armed Forces who flew into war zones in the Kargil War. In 2004, her career as a helicopter pilot ended after serving for eight years. Permanent commissions were not available during her time in service.

== Personal life ==
Saxena's husband, Wing Commander Gautam Narain, is also an Indian Air Force pilot. He is the pilot of IAF Mi-17 helicopters. He also served as an instructor at the National Defence Academy, The couple have a daughter named Pragya.

== In popular culture ==
- A chapter in the book Kargil Untold Stories From The War by Rachna Bisht Rawat focuses on Gunjan Saxena.
- Gunjan Saxena's autobiography, titled The Kargil Girl, co-written by author-duo Kiran Nirvan, was released by Penguin Publishers along with the movie. The book garnered praise and five-star reviews by print and electronic media, including BBC India, CNN Network 18, Forbes India, Hindustan Times, The Tribune, etc. “Never jingoistic but measured and matter-of-fact, the book makes for thrilling reading with vividly described, moving, cinematic and enthralling scenes” is what Hindustan Times said about the book.
- The 2020 Bollywood film Gunjan Saxena: The Kargil Girl released on Netflix is inspired by her life. Saxena is portrayed by Janhvi Kapoor, while the film was produced by Dharma Productions and Zee Studios. The film portrays an inspiring story of her resilience. Saxena's father and brother are played by Pankaj Tripathi and Angad Bedi, respectively.

== Media inaccuracies ==
After the film was released, there was confusion related to some facts about Saxena, due to the film's dramatisation of events. In an article in NDTV she clarified some of them:

I was lucky and blessed to have so many firsts to my name in my years with the IAF. To list a few -- first in the order of merit during my basic training and also in helicopter training, the first woman to fly in a combat zone (mentioned in the Limca Book of Records), the first 'BG' (a coveted flying category) among women helicopter pilots and the first woman officer to undergo the jungle and snow survival course. There are other small achievements, but those are not of much significance to my story right now.

— Gunjan Saxena, NDTV

Neither I nor the filmmakers ever claimed I was a "Shaurya Chakra" awardee. After Kargil, I received the "Shaurya Veer" award from a civilian organisation in Uttar Pradesh. A certain section of the internet news possibly turned "Veer" into "Chakra". This has been clarified many times during my media interactions for the film's promotions.

— Gunjan Saxena, NDTV
