= Metro... In Dino =

2025 Indian film by Anurag Basu

- Theatrical release poster
- Directed by: Anurag Basu
- Written by: Anurag Basu
- Dialogues by: Sandeep Shrivastava; Samrat Chakravarthy
- Produced by: Bhushan Kumar; Krishan Kumar; Taani Basu
- Starring: Anupam Kher; Neena Gupta; Konkona Sen Sharma; Saswata Chatterjee; Pankaj Tripathi; Aditya Roy Kapur; Sara Ali Khan; Ali Fazal; Fatima Sana Shaikh
- Cinematography: Abhishek Basu; Anurag Basu
- Edited by: Bodhaditya Banerjee; Satish Gowda
- Music by: Pritam
- Production companies: T-Series Films; Anurag Basu Productions
- Distributed by: AA Films
- Release date: 4 July 2025
- Running time: 159 minutes
- Country: India
- Language: Hindi
- Budget: ₹47 crore

Metro... In Dino (transl. These Days in Metro) is a 2025 Indian Hindi-language musical romantic drama film written and directed by Anurag Basu. Jointly produced by Bhushan Kumar, Krishan Kumar and Anurag Basu under the banners of T-Series Films and Anurag Basu Productions, it is a spiritual sequel to Basu's 2007 anthology film Life in a... Metro.

The film stars an ensemble cast consisting of Anupam Kher, Neena Gupta, Konkona Sen Sharma, Pankaj Tripathi, Aditya Roy Kapur, Sara Ali Khan, Ali Fazal, and Fatima Sana Shaikh. The narrative interweaves multiple contemporary love stories set in urban India, exploring themes of connection, loneliness, and emotional vulnerability in modern relationships. The title of the film has a thematic link to the song 'In Dino' from the previous film 'Life in a...Metro'.

Principal photography began in December 2022 and concluded in February 2024, with filming taking place across several Indian cities, including Delhi, Mumbai, Kolkata, and Bengaluru. The music was composed by Pritam, marking another collaboration between the composer and Basu after their work on Life in a... Metro. The soundtrack features lyrics by Amitabh Bhattacharya, while cinematography, editing, and production design were handled by Rajesh Shukla, Akiv Ali, and Parichit Paralkar, respectively. Metro... In Dino was released theatrically on 4 July 2025 to positive reviews from the critics, eventually emerging as a commercial success.

== Plot ==
The film follows the lives of 8 people as they connect with each other and deals with themes of infidelity, abortion, and finding love. The story begins with Akash Arya, (software engineer & aspiring singer), Shruti Shukla Arya (former news reporter), and Parth Sachdeva (travel blogger) who have been friends since college, meeting up in Bengaluru after a long time on Holi. As they celebrate holi they discuss life struggles. Chumki, a confused and unsure private sector employee, also celebrates Holi with her friends in Bengaluru and gets so drunk that she mixes up her apartment building name and reaches a flat in another apartment building, (the flat where Parth is to stay during his Bengaluru visit).

After celebrating Holi, as Parth was freshening up in the bathroom, suddenly Chumki barges in to vomit and then passes out. After Parth brings her out of the bathroom, Chumki regains consciousness, and starts screaming at Parth. Parth tries to pacify her, but suddenly another girl who was supposed to meet him appears and misunderstands everything. Then Parth tries to explain to Chumki that she is in the wrong apartment. When Chumki realizes that, she apologizes, and Parth agrees to drop her to her own apartment building. Suddenly, Chumki receives a call from her boyfriend/fiancé, with whom she is engaged and who is also her colleague. Somehow Parth manages to take Chumki to her own apartment building, where her fiancé has been waiting for her. He misunderstands Chumki to be cheating on him with Parth.

On the other hand, Kajol Ghosh Sisodiya and her husband, Monty Sisodiya, who had a love marriage, are undergoing stress in their married life in Mumbai and their daughter Pihu is disturbed in her own life as well. She is unsure whether she likes a boy or a girl, but cannot discuss it with her parents. Meanwhile, to pacify her fiancé, Anand that nothing wrong has happened, Chumki meets with Parth once again and concocts a story in which Shruti acts as the girlfriend of Parth. Accordingly, Chumki and Anand meet with Parth and Shruti in a restaurant for an office party, where Parth concocts a story that Anand believes.

Kajol and Chumki's mother, Shibani Ghosh, is married to Sanjeev Ghosh, who lives in Pune and faces loneliness in old age as her life seems boring. Suddenly she receives an invitation card for a college reunion in Kolkata, and despite objections by her husband, she leaves for Kolkata, where she meets up with all her old college mates, including Parimal Sarkar, who narrates his life story and seeks help from Shibani, to force his daughter-in-law Jhinuk to move on in her life after the death of her husband; his son Abir, and Parimal's wife in a car accident. He wants to set up Jhinuk with Rohan, the childhood friend of Abir. He has purposely started to act drunk and he asks Shibani to pretend to be his rude newly wedded wife who is after all coming home and wants a share in property.

Akash Arya is upset with his humdrum life and thinks he too, like his father, will have to give up on his dream to take care of his family, as Shruti reveals she is pregnant. So he decides to quit his job and try his luck as a struggler in Bombay, seeking entry into Bollywood as a singer. Meanwhile, as a mutual decision, Shruti decides to abort her baby and goes to the hospital for the procedure but gets cold feet and does not abort. However, she does not reveal it to Akash. Monty on advice of his friends creates a fake Tinder profile and starts flirting with a lady, which is Kajol's fake Tinder profile. They share their life problems. Kajol recognizes the picture of a plane oi his picture and purposely starts to chat with him to see how far he can go with this.

As Akash moves to Bombay, Shruti returns to Delhi to rejoin her old news network, who welcome her back with open arms. Here she meets a cameraman who is a widower with a son and slowly develops feelings for him. Parth tells her that he believes one can do anything as long as they are not hurting anyone. Chumki once again meets up with Parth. Meanwhile, Kajol decides to teach Monty a lesson by inviting him to meet her in a hotel, through her fake Tinder profile. When Monty comes to meet her in the hotel, she, with the help of her friend and wife of Monty's colleague, makes him wear a blindfold and disrobes him to embarrass him in public. Meanwhile, Parth starts to flirt with Chumki in Delhi, but Chumki makes it clear to him that he has no chance and she will marry Anand. Observing Shruti's lack of availability and her lying on calls, Akash shows up in Delhi, where he sees Parth and Shruti together and misunderstands the situation and indulges in a fight with Parth while Shruti calls out his own failures. However, she decides to travel to Mumbai to be with him. When Parth questions this, she tells him how he will not understand about true love and relationships.

Monty and Kajol start to live separately, and Kajol has moved to her parents' house in Pune. When Monty realizes his mistake and tries to win Kajol back, she plays hardball. Monty visits her to try to win her over when Kajol stuns everyone by revealing that she knew of her father Sanjeev's affair with her mother's sister Sheila. Then Shibani tells her that in marriages all have to adjust and compromise. Sanjeev then apologizes to her, and he asks Monty to ask for forgiveness from Kajol. He tells them they have to fall in love again and also suggests they go on a holiday. Monty and Kajol go on a trip to Goa. Kajol meets with a younger guy, Aryan, whom she starts spending more time with to make Monty jealous. She starts to fall for him but stops before crossing the line.

Sanjeev then follows Shibani to Kolkata, where he sees Shibani with Parimal together and misunderstands everything, creating a ruckus. Meanwhile, in an office in Delhi, Chumki faces regular harassment from her boss. Then Parth helps her to overcome her bottled up anger after which she slaps her boss and quits her job, despite Anand opposing it. Meanwhile, Rohan still tries to pursue Jhinuk, as he secretly always loved her. Parth shows off his new side by deciding to marry someone he always knew. Chumki arrives after she suddenly realizes she actually loves him and not Anand. In the same way, Kajol also realizes that she still loves Monty. Meanwhile, after Parimal, with Shibani's help, intentionally hurts Jhinuk, she finally decides to move to London with Rohan.

All the main characters undergo personal revelations. Akash and Shruti, after clashing and briefly separating, realize through many trials that they cannot live without each other. Akash ultimately prioritizes Shruti over a singing engagement and returns to her. He apologizes for pressuring her into an abortion and is relieved that she chose not to go through with it. In doing so, he finally embraces both her and his family.

Meanwhile, Chumki's ex comes back to apologize, even claiming he quit his job for her. However, she has her own realization and runs to the train to confess her love to Parth. Parth, in turn, admits that he had liked her from the beginning and gradually fell in love with her. This leads to a comedic situation as Parth is on the verge of an arranged marriage, with family gathered from afar — but instead, he proposes to Chumki, and the two are married.

Pihu confides in her friend, who has feelings for her, that she is unsure whether she loves a boy (him) or a girl (her best friend). He gently tells her he is willing to wait until she understands her feelings.

Kajol and Monty reconcile as well, realizing they cannot live apart. Sanjeev and Shibani also make amends, with Shibani beginning to act in plays.

Shruti later gives birth to a son, while Akash begins to establish himself as a singer and learns to prioritize his wife's voice and opinions. Chumki becomes pregnant after marrying Parth, and in a parallel to Shruti and Akash's earlier debates, they too share a similar exchange.

Parimal remains alone, but content, cooking for himself and finding peace in his solitude.

== Cast ==
- Anupam Kher as Parimal Sarkar
- Saswata Chatterjee as Sanjeev Ghosh
- Neena Gupta as Shibani Ghosh
- Konkona Sen Sharma as Kajol Ghosh Sisodiya
- Pankaj Tripathi as Monty Sisodiya
- Ahana Basu as Pihu Sisodiya
- Ali Fazal as Akash Arya
- Fatima Sana Shaikh as Shruti Shukla Arya
- Sara Ali Khan as Chumki Ghosh
- Aditya Roy Kapur as Parth Sachdeva
- Pranay Pachauri as Rohan
- Darshana Banik as Jhinuk Sarkar
- Rohan Gurbaxani as Aryan
- Kush Jotwani as Anand

=== Cameo appearances ===
- Imtiaz Ali as himself
- Anurag Basu as himself
- Vijay Ganguli as himself

=== Metro band ===
- Pritam
- Papon
- Raghav Chaitanya

== Production ==
In a news interview, director Anurag Basu revealed that the idea of the film first came during a casual conversation with late actor Irrfan Khan, who said, Metro 2 banaate hai (Let's make Metro 2).

=== Casting ===
Konkana Sen Sharma was the only actor to return from Life in a... Metro (2007), reprising her presence in the spiritual successor. Director Anurag Basu reunited with Pankaj Tripathi, Aditya Roy Kapur, and Fatima Sana Shaikh, all of whom had previously appeared in his ensemble film Ludo (2020). The principal cast also includes Sara Ali Khan, Ali Fazal, Anupam Kher, and Neena Gupta in key roles.

=== Filming ===
Principal photography began in December 2022 in Kolkata. Subsequent schedules took place across multiple cities, including Mumbai, Bengaluru, and Pune. Filming concluded in February 2024 in Delhi, which was preceded by scenes being shot at the Barog railway station, in Himachal Pradesh, which wrapped on 5 February 2025.

== Soundtrack ==
The film's soundtrack is composed by Pritam, marking his reunion with director Anurag Basu after their collaboration on Ludo (2020). The album features a mix of original compositions aligned with the film's themes of urban relationships and emotional introspection. The film also follows the style of Hollywood musicals in which the characters break fourth wall and speak directly with the audience in songs. Notably, cast members Anupam Kher and Aditya Roy Kapur both sang for the soundtrack.

== Release ==
Metro... In Dino was released theatrically on 4 July 2025. The film was initially scheduled for release on 29 November 2024 but was postponed due to post-production delays. The film was released on Netflix on 29 August 2025.

== Reception ==
Metro… In Dino received generally positive reviews from critics, who praised its ensemble performances, thematic depth, and Pritam's music, while some noted issues with pacing and narrative cohesion in the second half. As a spiritual sequel to Basu's Life in a... Metro (2007), the film was noted for its exploration of modern urban relationships and emotional complexity. On the review aggregator website Rotten Tomatoes, 69% of 16 critics' reviews are positive, with an average rating of 6.1/10.

The performances of the ensemble cast were widely highlighted. Pankaj Tripathi and Konkona Sen Sharma, portraying Monty and Kajol, were praised for their portrayal of a middle-aged couple navigating marital strain; The Hindu described their chemistry as "electric" and commended the balance of humor and emotional gravity in their scenes. Neena Gupta and Anupam Kher's track was described as "warm, witty, and deeply moving" by News18, for its sensitive depiction of late-life companionship. Fatima Sana Shaikh and Ali Fazal's storyline received appreciation for its emotional resonance, although The Times of India noted that their arc required tighter writing.

Sara Ali Khan’s performance as Chumki received mixed reviews. Hindustan Times described her as a "show-stealer" for her relatable portrayal of a conflicted young woman, while Rediff.com criticized her performance for being overshadowed by costume choices and tonal inconsistency. Aditya Roy Kapur was noted for his charm, though his role was viewed by some critics as underwritten.

Pritam's soundtrack received widespread acclaim and was considered integral to the film's tone and structure. India Today stated that "the music doesn’t decorate the film, it defines it," with songs such as “Zamaana Lage” and “Aur Mohabbat Kitni Karoon” singled out for praise. Bollywood Hungama called “Dhaagena Tinak Dhin” a standout for its “catchy tune and vibrant visuals.”

The first half of the film was praised for its humor and narrative momentum. Times Now described it as a "humorous, heartwarming, and feel-good approach to relationships." In contrast, the second half received criticism for its slower pace and unresolved subplots. The Hollywood Reporter India remarked that the narrative "drifts along in the second half without accomplishing anything substantial," while Rediff.com called it a "meandering mess."

Reviewers also commended the film's engagement with contemporary themes such as infidelity, abortion, and LGBTQIA+ representation. Filmfare awarded the film 3.5 out of 5 stars, highlighting Basu's "earnest and observant" storytelling, while Bollywood Hungama rated it 4 out of 5, calling it a "refreshing, one-of-a-kind musical entertainer."
