= Ludo (film) =

2020 Indian film by Anurag Basu

- Official release poster
- Directed by: Anurag Basu
- Written by: Anurag Basu
- Produced by: Bhushan Kumar; Divya Khosla Kumar; Krishan Kumar; Anurag Basu; Tani Basu; Deepshikha Bose
- Starring: Abhishek Bachchan; Aditya Roy Kapur; Rajkummar Rao; Pankaj Tripathi; Fatima Sana Shaikh; Sanya Malhotra; Rohit Saraf; Pearle Maaney
- Cinematography: Anurag Basu, Rajesh Shukla
- Edited by: Steven H. Bernard; Hemal Kothari
- Music by: Pritam
- Production companies: T-Series Films; Anurag Basu Productions; Ishana Movies
- Distributed by: Netflix
- Release date: 12 November 2020
- Running time: 150 minutes
- Country: India
- Language: Hindi

Ludo is a 2020 Indian Hindi-language black comedy crime film written and directed by Anurag Basu. It stars an ensemble cast of Abhishek Bachchan, Aditya Roy Kapur, Rajkummar Rao, Fatima Sana Shaikh, Sanya Malhotra, Rohit Saraf, and Pearle Maaney. It was produced by T-Series Films, Anurag Basu Productions and Ishana Movies.

The film was released on 12 November 2020 coinciding with Diwali on Netflix. At the 66th Filmfare Awards, Ludo received a leading 16 nominations, including Best Film, Best Director (Basu), Best Actor, Best Actor (Critics) (both for Rao), Best Actress (Critics) (Malhotra), and Best Supporting Actor (Tripathi), and won Best Music Director (Pritam).

== Plot ==
Sattu, a notorious don has to settle old scores with Bittu, formerly his right-hand man. Sattu is the dice of Ludo; Bittu forms the red side of Ludo. Akash and his girlfriend, Shruti, form the yellow side. They find that someone has recorded and uploaded a video of their affair on the Internet. Then they begin finding the culprit to delete the video. Sheeja Thomas, a Malayali nurse, and Rahul Awasthi, a struggling man from a small town being bullied by his boss, form the blue side. They find Sattu's treasure - two bags full of money - and the gang chases them as they try to escape with said bags. Alu and his sweetheart Pinky form the green side; she seeks Alu's help to save her husband from being suspected in a murder case. These four stories become entangled in a series of events, leading to an engaging climax where all sides are present.

== Cast ==
- Abhishek Bachchan as Batukeshwar "Bittu" Tiwari
- Aditya Roy Kapur as Akash Chauhan
- Rajkummar Rao as Alok Kumar "Alu" Gupta
- Pankaj Tripathi as Satyendra "Sattu" Tripathi
- Fatima Sana Shaikh as Pinky Jain
- Sanya Malhotra as Shruti Choksi
- Rohit Saraf as Rahul Awasthi
- Pearle Maaney as Sheeja Thomas
- Asha Negi as Asha Pathak
- Bhanu Uday as Bhanu Pathak
- Shalini Vatsa as Lata Kutty
- Geetanjali Mishra as Sambhavi
- Ishtiyak Khan as Inspector Sukumar Sinha
- Anurag Basu as Narrator Yamraj (Cameo appearance)
- Rahul Bagga as Chitragupta (Cameo appearance)
- Aarti Ashar as Akash's sister in law
- Aman Bhagat as Shekhar Jalani, Shruti's fiancé
- Paritosh Tripathi as Manohar "Mannu" Jain
- Inayat Verma as Mini
- Akash Mahamana as the bearded goon
- Sundeep Sharma as Sattu’s goon
- Satish Sharma as Local Investor

== Release ==
The film was initially scheduled to release on 24 April 2020 but was postponed due to the COVID-19 pandemic. Though there were rumors that the film would be released on Amazon Prime Video, the release rights were sold to Netflix. The film was to release on 13 November but then was pushed forward by one day to avoid a clash with Amazon Prime Video's Chhalaang. The film was finally released on 12 November on Netflix.

== Reception ==
On the review aggregator website Rotten Tomatoes, 75% of 16 critics' reviews are positive, with an average rating of 6.3/10.

Anupama Chopra, Editor-in-Chief of Film Companion, wrote, "Whatever faults you might find with an Anurag Basu film, lack of invention isn’t one of them. The director creates worlds filled with whimsy and wonder, set to Pritam’s pulsating soundscape." Shubhra Gupta of The Indian Express wrote, "Still, in this time of corona, the virus finding an honourable mention in the movie, we could do with some fun and games, even if it slackens in bits," praising Basu for using "perky musical interludes" to narrate the story. India Today reviewed the movie positively, calling it 'naram-garam and delicious' which is "out-of-the-box while staying firmly in the box." A review by the Hindustan Times said, "despite its missteps, keeps it breezy, with its cast helping it to stay the course." The Hindu film critic found "the structure of Ludo written with careful precision and the construct is cleaner," which makes the film 'largely entertaining'. While, The Wire's Tanul Thakur felt that Ludo 'suffers' because Basu is "more interested in the mechanics of this tapestry, the many ways in which the disparate stories intersect and inform each other, as opposed to the tapestry itself: its overarching meaning, its dramatic power, its psychological portraits." Critic associated with the Deccan Herald received the movie as "a big disappointment". The Quint's review of the film said that "the screenplay steers clear of extravagance, which works in its favor." "While the setting may seem fable-like, the emotions they evoke in us are authentic. It might take some time to get used to, but once we understand the spirit of the film Ludo can prove to be a lot of fun."

== Accolades ==
Award	Date of ceremony	Category	Recipient(s)	Result	Ref.
Filmfare Awards	17 May 2021	Best Film	Bhushan Kumar, Divya Khosla Kumar, Krishan Kumar and Anurag Basu	Nominated	
Filmfare Awards	17 May 2021	Best Director	Anurag Basu	Nominated	
Filmfare Awards	17 May 2021	Best Screenplay	Anurag Basu	Nominated	
Filmfare Awards	17 May 2021	Best Production Design	Anurag Basu	Nominated	
Filmfare Awards	17 May 2021	Best Actor	Rajkummar Rao	Nominated	
Filmfare Awards	17 May 2021	Best Actor (Critics)	Rajkummar Rao	Nominated	
Filmfare Awards	17 May 2021	Best Actress (Critics)	Sanya Malhotra	Nominated	
Filmfare Awards	17 May 2021	Best Supporting Actor	Amit Sadh	Nominated	
Filmfare Awards	17 May 2021	Best Music Director	Pritam	Won	
Filmfare Awards	17 May 2021	Best Background Score	Pritam	Nominated	
Filmfare Awards	17 May 2021	Best Lyricist	Sayeed Qadri (For the song Humdum Hardam)	Nominated	
Filmfare Awards	17 May 2021	Best Male Playback Singer	Arijit Singh (For the song Aabad Barbaad)	Nominated	
Filmfare Awards	17 May 2021	Best Editing	Ajay Sharma	Nominated	
Filmfare Awards	17 May 2021	Best Dialogue	Samrat Chakraborty	Nominated	
Filmfare Awards	17 May 2021	Best Costume Design	Ashish Dwyer	Nominated	
Filmfare Awards	17 May 2021	Best Sound Design	Abhishek Nair and Shijin Melvin Hutton	Nominated	
IIFA Awards	4 June 2022	Best Director	Anurag Basu	Nominated	
IIFA Awards	4 June 2022	Best Story	Anurag Basu	Nominated	
IIFA Awards	4 June 2022	Best Supporting Actor	Pankaj Tripathi	Won	
IIFA Awards	4 June 2022	Best Supporting Actress	Shalini Vatsa	Nominated	
IIFA Awards	4 June 2022	Best Music Director	Pritam	Nominated	
IIFA Awards	4 June 2022	Best Male Playback Singer	Arijit Singh (For the song Aabad Barbaad)	Nominated	

== Soundtrack ==
The film's soundtrack and score is composed by Pritam in his fifth successive collaboration with Anurag Basu after Gangster (2006), Life in a... Metro (2007), Barfi! (2012), and Jagga Jasoos (2017). The soundtrack to Ludo was the "toughest album to be composed" as the storyline is being centred on multiple narratives. Unlike, Basu's earlier films, he wrote the script without the songs coming organically and later incorporated the songs in the screenplay. The album was composed in entirety at Pritam's house in Kolkata during the COVID-19 pandemic lockdown in India. In an interview with Grazia India, Basu stated that the song "Hardum Humdum" was originally composed for the sequel of Life in a... Metro titled Metro... In Dino. When the film did not materialise, he decided to use the same track in this film.

The album features four original tunes and three alternates of the original tracks. The lyrics were written by Sayeed Quadri, Sandeep Shrivastava, Shloke Lal, and Swanand Kirkire. The soundtrack album to the film was released on 28 October 2020. Bhushan Kumar, the producer of the film, who also owned the audio rights, promoted the soundtrack as albums for films premiering on digital platforms will not have exposure to the audiences, unlike the soundtracks to the theatrically-released films.

The album received a positive response from critics and audiences, appreciating Pritam for his compositions and Basu for incorporating the placement of the songs that suited the film's narrative. The tracks "Aabaad Barbaad", "Hardum Humdum" and "Meri Tum Ho" topped the music and streaming charts and were chartbusters.

== Future ==
In an interview with PTI in February 2021, Anurag Basu said "the script of Ludo 2 is completely ready" and that he has already discussed it with the film's producer, Bhushan Kumar.
