= Gunjan Saxena: The Kargil Girl =

2020 Indian film by Sharan Sharma

- Netflix release poster
- Directed by: Sharan Sharma
- Written by: Nikhil Mehrotra; Sharan Sharma
- Produced by: Karan Johar; Hiroo Yash Johar; Apoorva Mehta; Zee Studios
- Starring: Janhvi Kapoor; Pankaj Tripathi; Angad Bedi
- Cinematography: Manush Nandan
- Edited by: Nitin Baid
- Music by: Score: John Stewart Eduri; Songs: Amit Trivedi
- Production companies: Dharma Productions; Zee Studios
- Distributed by: Netflix
- Release date: 12 August 2020
- Running time: 112 minutes
- Country: India
- Language: Hindi

Gunjan Saxena: The Kargil Girl is a 2020 Indian Hindi-language biographical drama film, directed by Sharan Sharma and produced under Dharma Productions and Zee Studios. The film stars Janhvi Kapoor as Indian Air Force pilot Gunjan Saxena, one of the first women to fly in a combat zone, alongside Pankaj Tripathi and Angad Bedi in supporting roles.

Principal photography commenced in February 2019 and was wrapped up in October; it was extensively filmed across Lucknow. Due to the COVID-19 pandemic, the film was unable to release theatrically and was picked up for distribution by Netflix. It was released globally on 12 August 2020.

At the 66th Filmfare Awards, Gunjan Saxena: The Kargil Girl received 8 nominations, including Best Film, Best Director (Sharma), Best Actress (Kapoor) and Best Supporting Actor (Tripathi).

== Plot ==
Beginning in Lucknow, in 1984, the story begins with young Gunjan Saxena on a flight along with her older brother, Anshuman. Gunjan wants to look out of the airplane window, but Anshuman doesn't let her. A kind air hostess tends to the problem and takes Gunjan to the cockpit. Looking at the cockpit immediately sparks a desire in her mind to become a pilot as she feels enthusiastic about the plane's features.

A few years later, Gunjan is congratulated for her academic excellence with her proud parents, Anup and Kirti, were planning to send her to high school. Gunjan, however wants to drop out of high school to become a pilot. Anshuman, her brother feels that women should not be in the cockpit, but in kitchen making food for the family, but her father strongly disagrees. A firm believer of gender equality, he allows Gunjan to experiment with her desire to become a pilot. Gunjan makes multiple attempts, but these are thwarted by concerns regarding her educational qualifications and high costs, causing her to return home dejected each time. While her parents differ in their outlook towards her dream, with her mother hoping her daughter would soon be wary and Anup insistent on allowing his daughter to pursue her dreams relentlessly, an advertisement in a newspaper for acceptance into the Indian Air Force provides Gunjan just the right opportunity for making an effort to enter the air force. Anshuman, who is himself serving in the army, completely disapproves and tells Gunjan that the Air Force isn't a place for women. She, however, ignores him, and goes ahead with the formalities, later finding out on the day of the results that she is the only female who got accepted.

During her medical tests, Gunjan learns that she is one centimeter too short and seven kilograms overweight for the Air Force requirements. She is devastated by this, but learns that she can take a retest in two weeks, and discusses it with Anup, who asks her not to give up, and together they come up with a workout regime to lose weight. She ends up losing more than the 7 kilograms that were required. Across the retest, she still falls short on the height criterion, but the officers conclude that the length of her hands and legs would compensate for it, and accept her into the force. However, while Anup and Kirti are unable to contain their pride, Anshuman still remains in denial of his sister's dedication, but Gunjan decides to ignore his reservations and commences training. During her training, she finds herself subjected to several harsh realities and inconveniences due to the male-dominated order of the air force, and contemplates leaving the camp, when a crisis situation causes her to reconsider when, in 1999, the Kargil war begins, and all Air Force pilots are needed. Gunjan is determined to take part in the war, and despite Anshuman meeting her and dissuading her from participation, disregards his reservations yet again. She finds herself badly needed in a mission and proceeds with it, but is then ordered to abort because the mission is too difficult for her. She reluctantly resigns to the camp. Suddenly, news of army soldiers being heavily wounded in the battle arrives, and it is up to her to save them.

Gunjan and another pilot take separate helicopters and go over to aid the injured soldiers. Back at the camp, army soldiers ask her to abort the mission but regardless of their opinion, she proceeds. Suddenly, as the other helicopter gets shot down from an RPG attack, Gunjan rescues the other pilot and the wounded soldiers and successfully completes a risky maneuver, despite being exposed to bullets herself. After the mission and the war, she earns the respect by her fellow male soldiers and is rewarded with bravery and makes Anshuman and Anup proud.

== Cast ==
- Janhvi Kapoor as Gunjan Saxena, IAF pilot
  - Riva Arora as Young Gunjan
- Pankaj Tripathi as Lieutenant Colonel Anup Kumar Saxena, Gunjan's father
- Angad Bedi as Anshuman Saxena, Gunjan's brother
  - Aaryan Arora as Young Anshuman
- Ayesha Raza Mishra as Kirti Saxena, Gunjan's mother
- Manav Vij as Commanding officer Group Captain Gautam Sinha
- Vineet Kumar Singh as Fight commander officer Dileep Singh
- Chandan K. Anand as Chief Instructor Ashish Ahuja
- Yogendra Vikram Singh as Pilot Montu
- Barbie Rajput as Mannu, Gunjan's friend
- Sharik Khan as Dileep's friend
- Rachana Parulkar (uncredited role)

== Production ==
Principal photography for the film was commenced in February 2019, with the film being extensively shot at Lucknow. The film's shooting, despite being continued for three months, came to halt in May 2019, citing the bad weather, but later resumed the same month. The first schedule of the film was completed on 24 May 2019.

While the team planned to shoot few scenes at London on July, the team planned to change the location to Georgia. The team planned to shoot some sequences high altitude regions of Georgia in the north eastern part of the country in a town called Kazbegi. The town is a mountainous area set over 5700 feet above sea level. Both Janhvi Kapoor and Angad Bedi have shot the sequences for maintaining fitness for their roles, being accompanied by coach Brinston Miranda. Shooting of the film was wrapped up on 29 December 2019.

== Soundtrack ==
Gunjan Saxena: The Kargil Girl

Soundtrack album by Amit Trivedi
- Released: 3 August 2020
- Recorded: 2019
- Genre: Feature film soundtrack
- Length: 25:24
- Language: Hindi
- Label: Zee Music Company

Amit Trivedi chronology
Sye Raa Narasimha Reddy (2019)	Gunjan Saxena: The Kargil Girl (2020)	V (2020)
External audio
- Official Jukebox on YouTube

The film's music was composed by Amit Trivedi while lyrics were written by Kausar Munir.

Track listing
No.	Title	Singer(s)	Length
1.	"Bharat Ki Beti"	Arijit Singh, Arhaan Hussain, Rohan Vaidya, Harshavardhan Gore, Rashi Harmalkar, Shanana Shome, Ahana Goyal	4:20
2.	"Asmaan Di Pari"	Jyoti Nooran	3:52
3.	"Dori Tutt Gaiyaan"	Rekha Bhardwaj	3:51
4.	"Dhoom Dhadaka"	Sukhwinder Singh	3:12
5.	"Rekha O Rekha"	Nakash Aziz	3:38
6.	"Mann Ki Dori" (Male)	Armaan Malik	3:35
7.	"Mann Ki Dori" (Female)	Palak Muchhal	2:56
Total length:			25:24

== Controversies ==
=== Factual inaccuracies ===
Gunjan Saxena's coursemate Sreevidya Rajan posted on Facebook claiming she was the first woman pilot to fly in Kargil, even before Gunjan came to Srinagar. She said they were both posted at Udhampur, however Rajan was sent to the deployment at Srinagar when the conflict started, and flew missions in the conflict area. Saxena came to Srinagar with the next crew few days later, and they participated in the operations together. Retired Wing Commander Namrita Chandi also said that it was not Gunjan, but Sreevidya Rajan who was the first lady pilot who flew to Kargil, and said that credit was being taken away. Rajan said she had never claimed credit because of her strong belief in gender equality. She also stated that heroic acts may have been shown as part of cinematic licence.

Replying to the claims, Saxena said that she and Rajan were not stationed together at Srinagar during the Kargil operations, nor did they fly together. During a media interaction arranged by the IAF towards the end of the Kargil conflict, Saxena's name was projected as the first woman to fly for the IAF in a combat zone. She was credited with the same in headlines, articles and the Limca Book of Records.

=== Portrayal of Armed Forces ===
Authorities in the Indian Air Force (IAF) wrote a letter to the Central Board of Film Certification over the alleged "undue negative portrayal" of the IAF personnel. Pointing out that IAF was the first branch of Indian Armed Forces to recruit female officers in the force, the IAF said that they have a gender-neutral workforce and do not propagate gender biases in their service. IAF claimed that Johar had agreed to represent it with authenticity and "make all efforts to ensure that the film helps inspire the next generation of IAF Officers." Certain scenes and dialogues in the film and its trailer were shown to have projected the IAF in bad light. Many ex-army officers expressed similar concerns. A lady officer and helicopter pilot of the same batch, Wing Commander Namrita Chandi also remarked that the makers had exaggerated the gender conflict. Wing Commander Deepa Nailwal also stated the same. Later, the Defense Ministry also raised concerns over the gender disparity shown in the film.

Defending the portrayal of gender bias in the film, Saxena clarified that the "bias is not at an organizational level", and added that "Since the bias is not at an organizational level, the experiences of different woman officers would be different. To deny it completely speaks of a feudal mindset and undermines the grit of women officers".

=== Nepotism ===
Following the death of actor Sushant Singh Rajput, Gunjan Saxena: The Kargil Girl was subject to a campaign targeted against the film and its producer Karan Johar for supporting nepotism by casting Janhvi Kapoor, daughter of actress Sridevi and producer Boney Kapoor, in the film. In a teaser poster announcing the film's release date on Netflix, Johar and Dharma Productions were not mentioned. Commentators believed this was due to the nepotism allegations.

== Release ==
The film was scheduled to release theatrically on 13 March 2020, and was later postponed to 24 April 2020. Due to the COVID-19 pandemic, the film's theatrical release was put on hold. The film's digital streaming rights were acquired by Netflix. On 9 June 2020, Netflix released a teaser video introducing Gunjan Saxena and also announcing the film's release date. The film was premiered on the streaming platform on 12 August 2020.

== Critical reception ==
On the review aggregator website Rotten Tomatoes, 100% of 17 critics' reviews are positive, with an average rating of 6.7/10. The film was received well in review from critics. Renuka Vyavahare of The Times Of India gave the film 4/5 and wrote "Gunjan Saxena: The Kargil Girl is a deeply moving tale of a feminist father and his feisty daughter. It wages war against patriarchal mind-set and discrimination, and identifies it as a bigger threat to progress than the one we perhaps tackled in 1999". Geetika Mantri of The News Minute gave the film a rating of 4/5 and wrote "The film makes you uncomfortable and emotional without obnoxious jingoism that’s common in army films". Anna M. M. Vetticad of Firstpost gave the film 4 stars out of 5, and found the film to be a "deeply moving account of a remarkable woman's heartbreaks and soaring triumph". Stutee Ghosh of The Quint gave the film a rating of 4/5 and wrote "The real, steady moments where the film shines are in the emotional scenes, stripped of melodrama. An intensely emotional tale told with restraint, Gunjan Saxena seals a place in our hearts". Pooja Prabbhan of The Free Press Journal gave the film a rating of 4/5 and wrote "Gunjan Saxena makes for an impressive watch with a storyline which highlights misogyny that triggers feelings of angst".

Divyanshi Sharma of India Today gave the film a rating of 3.5/5 and wrote "The Kargil Girl is named as cleverly as it is written. The film is first about Gunjan Saxena’s journey, and then about her contribution to the Kargil War". Vaibhavi V Risbood of Pinkvilla gave the film a rating of 3.5/5 and wrote "Gunjan Saxena is a film that must be appreciated and acknowledged for telling a story that will inspire us in many ways – to dream a dream, fight for it, and fight against all the odds". Saibal Chatterjee of NDTV rated it 3.5 out of 5 lauded Tripathi's performance and praised the film for sparing audience a "spectacle of ungainly chest-thumping" and for presenting "good old touching tale of a girl who dared to break free from her cage and fly away – a heroine we can cheer without resorting to a blood-curdling war cry". Mayank Shekhar of the Mid-Day gave the film a rating of 3.5/5.

Aishwarya Vasudevan of Dna India gave the film a rating of 3/5 and wrote "Pankaj Tripathi is the show stealer as a feminist father in Gunjan Saxena: The Kargil Girl". Bollywood Hungama gave the film a rating of 3/5 and wrote "Gunjan Saxena is a well narrated tale of female war hero of India.Despite some minuses, the flick would touch a chord especially with family audience". Shubhra Gupta of The Indian Express gave the film a rating of 2.5/5 and wrote "Janhvi Kapoor does get better as she goes along, but performance-wise, she is still clearly a work-in-progress. She was excellent in her small part in Ghost Stories, and going by that, I was expecting more".

Rohan Naahar of The Hindustan Times stated "Janhvi Kapoor and Pankaj Tripathi’s film is a refreshing change of pace for war films in India, which have forever been defined by whatever JP Dutta does". Kennith Rosario of The Hindu stated "Narrated in a tried-and-tested three-act structure, ‘Gunjan Saxena: The Kargil Girl’ makes ordinariness and familiar storytelling its strengths". Mike McCahill of The Guardian praised Kapoor's portrayal of Saxena.

== Accolades ==
Award (Note: Awards, festivals and organizations are in alphabetical order.)	Date of ceremony (Note: Date is linked to the article about the awards held that year, wherever possible.)	Category	Recipient(s)	Result	Ref.
Filmfare Awards	27 March 2021	Best Film	Dharma Productions, Zee Studios	Nominated	
Filmfare Awards	27 March 2021	Best Director	Sharan Sharma	Nominated	
Filmfare Awards	27 March 2021	Best Actress	Janhvi Kapoor	Nominated	
Filmfare Awards	27 March 2021	Best Supporting Actor	Pankaj Tripathi	Nominated	
Filmfare Awards	27 March 2021	Best Female Playback Singer	Palak Muchhal for "Mann Ki Dori"	Nominated	
Filmfare Awards	27 March 2021	Best Production Design	Aditya Kanwar	Nominated	
Filmfare Awards	27 March 2021	Best Sound Design	Ali Merchant	Nominated	
Filmfare Awards	27 March 2021	Best Special Effects	Jayesh Vaishnav	Nominated	
