= Pankaj Tripathi =

Indian actor (born 1976)

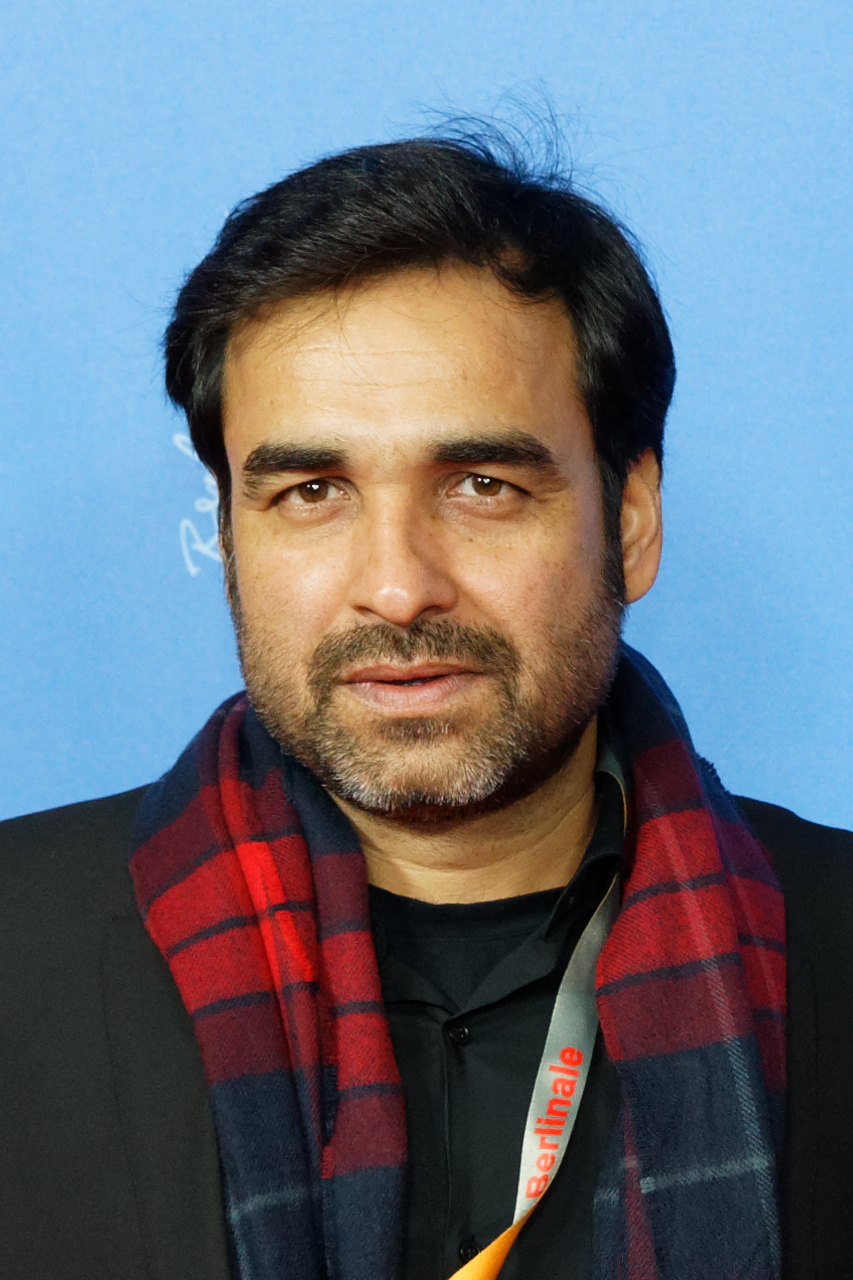
- Tripathi at the Berlin International Film Festival in 2017
- Born: Pankaj Tiwari; 5 September 1976 (age 50); Belsand, Bihar, India
- Education: National School of Drama; Institute of Hotel Management
- Occupation: Actor
- Years active: 2003–present
- Works: Full list
- Spouse: Mridula Tripathi (m. 2004)
- Children: 1

Pankaj Tripathi, born as Pankaj Tiwari (5 September 1976), is an Indian actor who predominantly works in Hindi films and series. He is the recipient of two National Film Awards and a Filmfare Award. After studying acting at the National School of Drama, Tripathi had minor roles in such films as Omkara (2006) and Agneepath (2012), and had a supporting role in the television series Powder (2010).

Tripathi gained recognition for his role in Anurag Kashyap's crime drama Gangs of Wasseypur (2012), after which he had several notable supporting roles. These include Fukrey (2013), Masaan (2015), Nil Battey Sannata (2016), Bareilly Ki Barfi, Fukrey Returns (both 2017), Stree (2018), Ludo, Gunjan Saxena: The Kargil Girl (both 2020), and 83 (2021). Tripathi has also had leading roles in several streaming series, including Mirzapur (2018–present) and Criminal Justice (2019–2022), and in the streaming film Kaagaz (2021). He has also appeared in the Tamil film Kaala (2018) and the English film Extraction (2020).

Tripathi won a National Film Award – Special Mention for his performance in Newton (2017). His performance in Mimi (2021) won him the National Film Award and the Filmfare Award for Best Supporting Actor. He has since starred in the social satire OMG 2 (2023) and the comedy horror sequel Stree 2 (2024).

== Early life ==
Tripathi was born on 5 September in either 1975 or 1976 in Belsand village of Barauli in the Gopalganj District of the Indian state of Bihar to Pandit Benares Tiwari and Hemwanti Tiwari as the youngest of their four children.

His father worked as a farmer and Hindu priest. Tripathi's original last name was Tiwari, which he changed legally to Tripathi in school as a 9th grader. Tripathi also worked as a farmer with his father until he was in the 11th standard at school. During the festive seasons, he used to play the role of a girl in his village's local play (natak).

Tripathi moved to Patna after high school where he studied at Institute of Hotel Management, Hajipur. After his seven-year stay in Patna, he moved to Delhi to enroll in the National School of Drama, from where he graduated in 2004.

== Career ==
=== Early work (2004–2015) ===
After appearing in a small role in the Kannada-language drama Chigurida Kanasu (2003), Tripathi moved to Mumbai in 2004. His first role in Hindi cinema was as a politician in a Tata Tea advertisement, followed by an uncredited role in the romantic action film Run (2004).

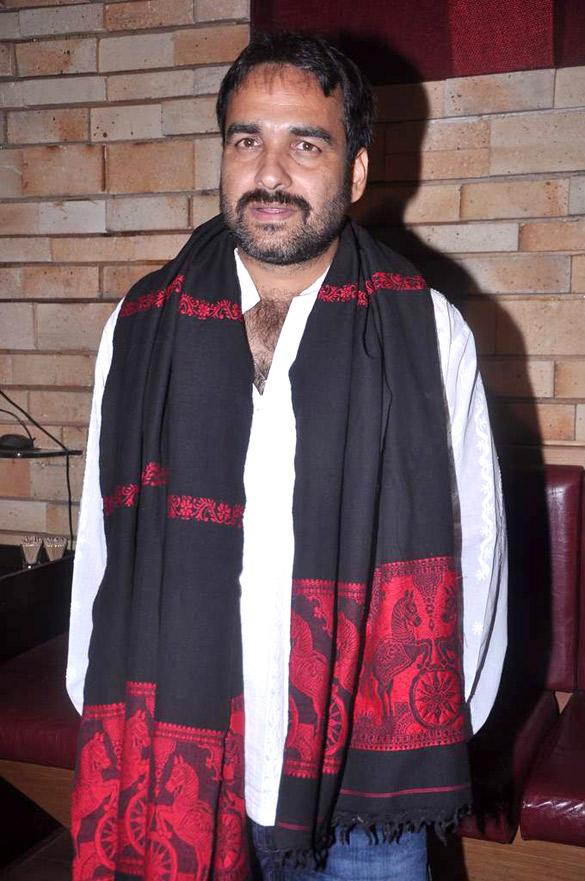
Tripathi at a press conference in 2011

During the early period of his career, he mostly played antagonistic roles and became synonymous with gangster characters. He appeared in various Hindi films in minor roles, including Bunty Aur Babli (2005), Apaharan (2005), Omkara (2006), Shaurya (2008), Raavan (2010), Aakrosh (2010), Chillar Party (2011), and Agneepath (2012).

He also appeared in the TV series Bahubali and the crime drama TV series Powder (2010) on Sony TV, as well as in a few daily soaps such as Zindagi Ka Har Rang...Gulaal (2010–11) and Sarojini - Ek Nayi Pehal (2015–16).

In 2012, he played his first major screen role as Sultan in the crime drama duology Gangs of Wasseypur. It proved to be Tripathi's breakthrough and brought him recognition, post which he continued to star in minor roles in films such as the action films Dabangg 2 (2012), Gunday (2014), Singham Returns (2014) and Dilwale (2015).

=== Acclaimed actor (2016–present) ===
Tripathi's first film as a lead actor was the neo-noir thriller Gurgaon (2017), which earned critical acclaim but emerged as a commercial disaster at the Box office. The same year, he also appeared in pivotal roles in several critical and commercially successful films such as the romantic comedy-drama Bareilly Ki Barfi and the comedy Fukrey Returns. He followed it up with the black comedy-drama Newton alongside Rajkummar Rao, which earned him his first nomination for the Filmfare Award for Best Supporting Actor. Newton was also India's official entry for the Academy Award for Best International Feature Film at the 90th Academy Awards.

In 2018, he starred alongside Rao and Shraddha Kapoor in the horror comedy Stree, which earned him high critical acclaim and the Screen Award for Best Supporting Actor, in addition to his second nomination for the Filmfare Award for Best Supporting Actor. Later that year, he made his debut in Tamil cinema with the Rajinikanth-starrer action drama Kaala. The same year, he also starred as Akhandanand Tripathi a.k.a. "Kaleen Bhaiya", a mafia don in the Amazon Prime crime drama thriller web series Mirzapur (2018–present) which earned him widespread critical acclaim and recognition, and a nomination for the Filmfare OTT Award for Best Supporting Actor in a Drama Series for the second season.

In 2019, Tripathi starred in several critically acclaimed supporting roles in commercial successes such as the romantic comedy-drama Luka Chuppi, the drama thriller The Tashkent Files and the biographical drama Super 30. The same year, he starred as Khanna Guruji, a spiritual leader alongside Saif Ali Khan, Nawazuddin Siddiqui, Kalki Koechlin and Ranvir Shorey in the second season of the neo-noir crime thriller Sacred Games (2018–19), which earned him high critical acclaim and a second nomination for the Filmfare OTT Award for Best Supporting Actor in a Drama Series. He also starred in the Disney+ Hotstar legal drama web series Criminal Justice as a lawyer, and reprised his role in the second (Behind Closed Doors (2020)) and third season (Adhura Sach (2022)). The second season earned him a nomination for the Filmfare OTT Award for Best Actor In A Drama Series.

In 2020, Tripathi starred alongside Chris Hemsworth, Randeep Hooda and David Harbour in his first Hollywood film, the Netflix action thriller Extraction. The same year, he received dual nominations for the Filmfare Award for Best Supporting Actor for his performances in the biographical drama Gunjan Saxena: The Kargil Girl and the black comedy Ludo. His performance in the latter won the IIFA Award for Best Supporting Actor.

In 2021, for a second consecutive year, Tripathi received dual nominations for the Filmfare Award for Best Supporting Actor for his widely acclaimed performances in the social comedy-drama Mimi and the biographical sports drama 83, winning the award for Mimi. His performance in Mimi also earned him the National Film Award for Best Supporting Actor. The same year, he also starred in the ZEE5 biographical comedy Kaagaz (2021), which earned him a nomination for the Filmfare OTT Award for Best Actor in A Web Original Film.

In 2023, he starred in the satirical comedy-drama OMG 2 alongside Akshay Kumar and Yami Gautam and the comedy Fukrey 3.

He next portrayed the former Indian Prime Minister Atal Bihari Vajpayee in the biographical drama Main Atal Hoon. The film was theatrically released in India on 19 January 2024.

Tripathi was the brand ambassador of Bharat Rang Mahotsav (National Theatre Festival) for the year 2024. In 2024, he reprised his role as Rudra in Stree 2.

His first release of the year 2025 was the sequel Metro... In Dino.

== Personal life ==
Tripathi met his wife Mridula during a wedding ceremony in 1993 when they were both in college and then got married on 15 January 2004. They moved to Mumbai after their marriage, and had a daughter named Aashi Tripathi in 2006.

== Artistry and media image ==
Tripathi is known as a method actor and is widely recognised for his unconventional choices. Namrata Joshi of The Wire termed him a "natural actor" and said, "Give Tripathi any role and he will make it his own with his signature style – minimalistic, effortless, unhurried." The Hindu noted, "We have been encountering him more often on screen than for real, in one power-packed performance after another." On his rise to success, A. Kameshwari of The Indian Express stated, "The actor, whose early roles are mostly credited as ‘unnamed character’, now has roles written specifically for him."

"With popularity I feel I need to be more careful about choosing scripts. I now look for roles and projects that are entertaining, but also have some social message or subtext."

— Tripathi explaining his approach in choosing films

Tripathi is known for his experimental roles, Sweta Kaushal of Hindustan Times feels he is not among those actors who'd get stuck in one type of role. She further added, "Tripathi's subtle portrayal of even the most dramatic character distinguishes him from many others in the business." While he had his breakthrough with Gangs of Wasseypur, Tripathi is popular for his portrayal of Kaleen Bhaiya in Mirzapur, which according to The Statesman, has been an inspiration for many aspiring actors.

His directors and producers, find him to be a natural and grounded actor. Raj Nidimoru said, "Given a specific or banal set of instructions, Tripathi would interpret it in a slightly different way and most of the times it would put a smile on your face." Karan Anshuman, who directed him in Mirzapur, says, "I know he’s got this mimetic ability to be who he needs to be once the camera rolls. When he finds that perfect note, when he knows he’s got it (and the director knows he’s got it), he holds on to it with such fierce consistency that the slightest shifts only serve to elevate his performance."

Tripathi is one of the highest paid OTT actors in India. For Newton, NDTV named him the "Best Actor" of 2017. In 2020, Rediff.com placed him sixth in their "10 Best Actors" of the year list, for his performance in Gunjan Saxena: The Kargil Girl and Ludo.

Tripathi is an active celebrity endorser for brands such as Star Plus, Tata Tea, Redmi, Policybazaar among others. In November 2023, NPCI appointed him as the "UPI Safety Ambassador". Along with his acting career, Tripathi has been associated to social causes such as tree plantation. In 2023, he opened a library at a school in Belsand, Gopalganj, in his father's memory. The Election Commission of India made Tripathi, the "National Icon" in 2022, to honour his association with ECI in creating awareness among voters.

== Awards and nominations ==
Year	Award	Nominated work	Category	Result	Ref.
Film Awards
2018	International Indian Film Academy Awards	Newton	Best Supporting Actor	Nominated	
2019	International Indian Film Academy Awards	Stree	Best Supporting Actor	Nominated	
2022	International Indian Film Academy Awards	83	Best Supporting Actor	Nominated	
2022	International Indian Film Academy Awards	Ludo	Best Supporting Actor	Won	
2018	Filmfare Awards	Newton	Best Supporting Actor	Nominated	
2019	Filmfare Awards	Stree	Best Supporting Actor	Nominated	
2021	Filmfare Awards	Gunjan Saxena: The Kargil Girl	Best Supporting Actor	Nominated	
2021	Filmfare Awards	Ludo	Best Supporting Actor	Nominated	
2022	Filmfare Awards	83	Best Supporting Actor	Nominated	
2022	Filmfare Awards	Mimi	Best Supporting Actor	Won	
2024	Filmfare Awards	OMG 2	Best Actor - Critics	Nominated	
2025	Filmfare Awards	Stree 2	Best Supporting Actor	Nominated	
2023	National Film Awards	Mimi	Best Supporting Actor	Won	
2018	Star Screen Awards	Newton	Best Supporting Actor	Nominated	
2019	Star Screen Awards	Stree	Best Supporting Actor	Won	
2013	Zee Cine Awards	Gangs of Wasseypur	Best Villain	Nominated	
2019	Zee Cine Awards	Stree	Best Supporting Actor	Nominated	
Television Awards
2021	Indian Television Academy Awards	Mirzapur	Best Actor in a Web Series	Won	
2019	iReel Awards	Mirzapur	Best Actor in a Drama Series	Won	
2020	Filmfare OTT Awards	Sacred Games 2	Best Supporting Actor in a Drama Series	Nominated	
2021	Filmfare OTT Awards	Mirzapur 2	Best Supporting Actor in a Drama Series	Nominated	
2021	Filmfare OTT Awards	Criminal Justice: Behind Closed Doors	Best Actor In A Drama Series	Nominated	
2021	Filmfare OTT Awards	Kaagaz	Best Actor in A Web Original Film	Nominated	
