= Janhvi Kapoor =

Indian actress (born 1997)

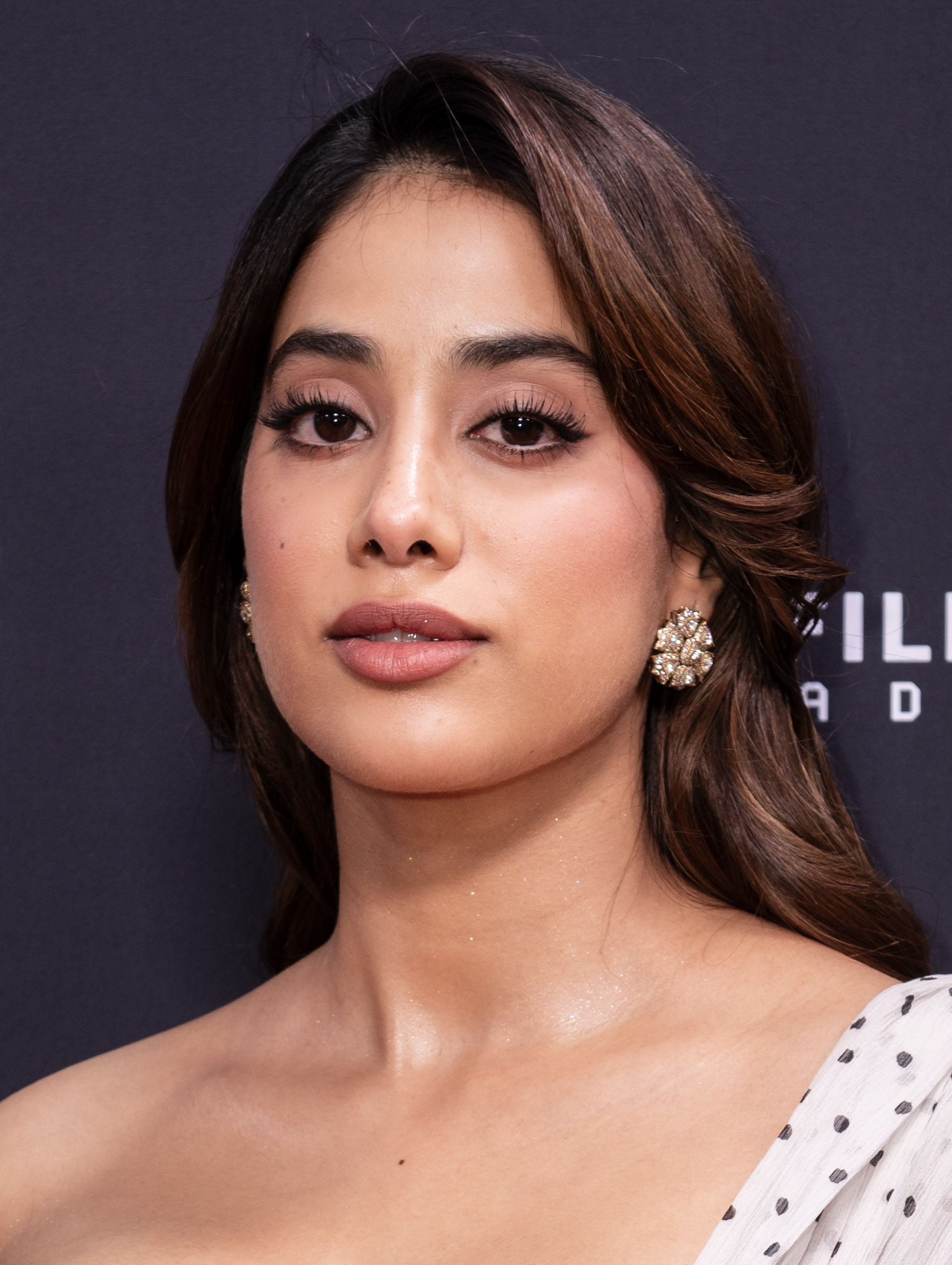
- Kapoor in 2025
- Born: 6 March 1997 (age 29); Mumbai, Maharashtra, India
- Occupation: Actress
- Years active: 2018–present
- Parents: Boney Kapoor (father); Sridevi Kapoor (mother)
- Relatives: See Kapoor family

Janhvi Kapoor (born 6 March 1997) is an Indian actress who works predominantly in Hindi films. Born to film actress Sridevi and producer Boney Kapoor, she made her acting debut in 2018 with the romantic drama Dhadak, which was a commercial success.

Her subsequent theatrical releases were commercially unsuccessful, but she received nominations for the Filmfare Award for Best Actress for playing the titular aviator in Gunjan Saxena: The Kargil Girl (2020) and a woman trapped in a freezer in Mili (2022). She has also appeared as the leading lady in the Telugu action dramas Devara: Part 1 (2024), which became the highest-grossing film of her career, and Peddi (2026). However, her roles in both films were poorly received, with critics noting their limited prominence within the films' male-dominated narratives. She has since starred in a supporting role as a woman of a lower-caste navigating social discrimination in Homebound (2025).

== Early life and background ==
Janhvi Kapoor was born on 6 March 1997 in Mumbai. Her father is the film producer Boney Kapoor, the son of the late filmmaker Surinder Kapoor, and her mother is the actress Sridevi. She is the niece of film actors Anil and Sanjay Kapoor. Her younger sister, Khushi, is also an actress. She has two half siblings, Arjun (an actor) and Anshula Kapoor from her father's first marriage. Kapoor lost her mother on 24 February 2018 at age 20, 10 days short of her 21st birthday, when she was found dead of an accidental drowning in Dubai.

Kapoor studied at Ecole Mondiale World School in Mumbai. Before making her film debut, she took an acting course from Lee Strasberg Theatre and Film Institute in California.

== Career ==
=== Debut and female-led films (2018–2022) ===
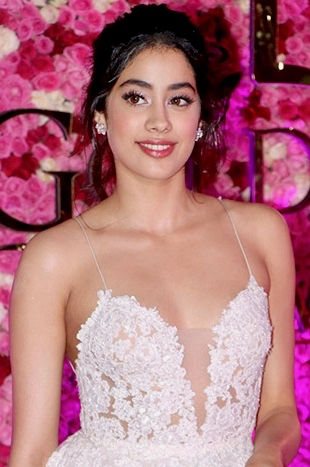
Kapoor at an event in 2018

Kapoor made her acting debut in 2018 with the Shashank Khaitan-directed romance Dhadak, co-starring Ishaan Khatter and produced under Karan Johar's studio Dharma Productions. A Hindi-language remake of the 2016 Marathi film Sairat, it featured her as a young upper-class girl whose life turns tragic after she elopes with a lower-class boy (played by Khatter). The film received predominantly negative reviews, but with a worldwide collection of ₹1.1 billion, it proved to be a commercial success. Writing for News18, Rajeev Masand criticised the film for removing caste-based references and deemed it inferior to the original, but felt Kapoor had "a fragility that makes her instantly endearing, and a soulful quality that makes it hard to take your eyes off her on screen". Conversely, Anna M. M. Vetticad of Firstpost thought that she "lacks personality and delivers a colourless performance". She won the Zee Cine Award for Best Female Debut.

Kapoor's next screen appearance came in 2020 when she starred in Zoya Akhtar's segment in the Netflix horror anthology film Ghost Stories. Shubhra Gupta of The Indian Express disliked the segments but added that the "only real surprise comes from Janhvi Kapoor in a solid, real act". She then took on the title role of aviator Gunjan Saxena in the biopic Gunjan Saxena: The Kargil Girl, which due to the COVID-19 pandemic could not be released theatrically and instead streamed on Netflix. In preparation, she spent time with Saxena, underwent physical training, and learned the body language of an air force officer. Saibal Chatterjee of NDTV described Kapoor's performance as "passably steady" while Rahul Desai of Film Companion was more appreciative of her "deceptively private performance" which he considered to be "pitch-perfect". She received a nomination for the Filmfare Award for Best Actress.

In 2021, Kapoor played a dual role opposite Rajkummar Rao in the comedy horror film Roohi. The film was theatrically released after several delays due to the second wave of the COVID-19 pandemic. The film and Kapoor's performance were panned by critics, and it performed poorly at the box-office. The following year, Kapoor starred in Good Luck Jerry, a remake of the 2018 Tamil film Kolamaavu Kokila, produced by Aanand L. Rai. It was released on the streaming platform Disney+ Hotstar. In her next film, Mili, a remake of the Malayalam film Helen, she played a young woman trapped in a freezer, which was played by Anna Ben in the original. Anupama Chopra was appreciative of the "sweetness and sincerity" she brought to the part but considered it much less accomplished than Ben's performance. It emerged as a box-office bomb. She received another Best Actress nomination at Filmfare.

=== Career setbacks (2023–present) ===
Kapoor starred opposite Varun Dhawan in Nitesh Tiwari's Bawaal (2023), a romantic drama about a feuding couple who learn about World War II as they travel across Europe. It was released digitally on Amazon Prime Video. The film received backlash for Holocaust trivialization. Writing for The New York Times, Beatrice Loayza criticised the lack of chemistry between the lead pair and dismissed Kapoor as "devoid of charisma". Leaf Arbuthnot of The Guardian also panned the film and their chemistry but was appreciative of her "still, mature performance".

In 2024, Kapoor had three film releases. She reunited with Rajkummar Rao for Dharma Productions' sports drama Mr. & Mrs. Mahi, about a man who vicariously fulfils his dreams of becoming a professional cricketer through his wife. Whilst filming cricketing sequences, Kapoor twice dislocated her shoulder. Shilajit Mishra of The Hindu felt that the actress had yet to achieve "requisite ease in performance" despite this being her ninth film. She then featured as a young Indian Foreign Service officer accused of dissent against the government in the political thriller Ulajh. Kapoor said that she felt much more involved in the film's creative process compared to her previous projects. In a mixed review of the film, The Quint's Pratikshya Mishra was appreciative of her handling of "emotionally demanding scenes". Similar to her previous theatrical releases, both Mr. & Mrs. Mahi and Ulajh were commercially unsuccessful.

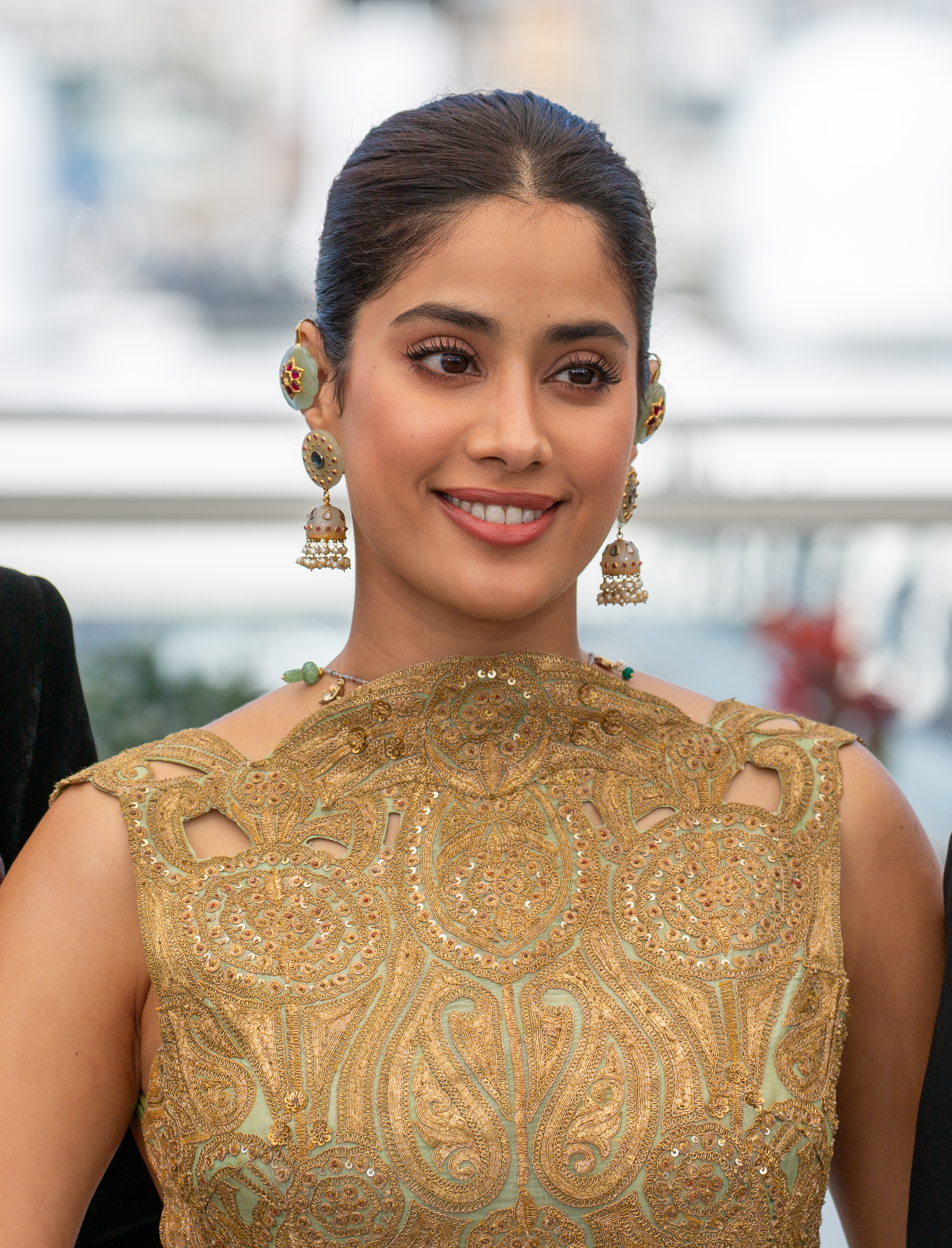
Kapoor at the 2025 Cannes Film Festival for the premiere of Homebound

Also in 2024, Kapoor expanded to Telugu cinema by playing a brief role opposite N. T. Rama Rao Jr in the action film Devara: Part 1 from filmmaker Koratala Siva. Rediff.com's Sukanya Verma dismissed her role in a rare androcentric project, writing that she "shows up only post interval to pout and preen around NTR's machismo". With a gross of over ₹5 billion (equivalent to ₹5.3 billion or US$57 million in 2026), Devara: Part 1 emerged as Kapoor's first commercial success since Dhadak, as well as the highest-grossing of her career. The following year, Kapoor had three releases, starting with Neeraj Ghaywan's Homebound, which premiered at the 78th Cannes Film Festival in the Un Certain Regard section. It earned unanimous critical acclaim, with Anupama Chopra of The Hollywood Reporter commending Kapoor for "demonstrating authenticity and the ability to deliver complex emotion" in a brief role. It had a theatrical release a few months later, where it had poor box-office returns.

Kapoor next starred opposite Sidharth Malhotra in Param Sundari, a romantic comedy in which a North Indian man (Malhotra) creates a fake matchmaking app that pairs him with a South Indian woman (Kapoor). The film faced substantial online backlash for perpetuating regressive stereotypes about South Indian culture, especially in its depiction of Kapoor's character, Sundari. In a scathing review for The Hollywood Reporter India, Rahul Desai criticised the film's writing and dismissed Kapoor's performance as derivative. Additionally, critics lamented the lack of chemistry between the lead pair. Kapoor ended the year with Khaitan's Sunny Sanskari Ki Tulsi Kumari, in which Scroll.in's Nandini Ramnath opined that she had been overshadowed by her co-star Dhawan. All of Kapoor's 2025 releases underperformed commercially.

In 2026, she featured in Buchi Babu Sana's Telugu action film Peddi starring Ram Charan. Several commentators criticised the film for its overly sexualised characterisation of Kapoor. In a scathing review of the film for Rediff.com, Sreeju Sudhakaran wrote that "The camera's obsession with objectifying [Kapoor]'s body, aided by revealing costumes, becomes increasingly uncomfortable to watch". It was a modest box-office success. Kapoor will continue her collaborations with Dharma Productions alongside Tiger Shroff and Lakshya in the romance Lag Jaa Gale. She will also appear in filmmaker Atlee's Telugu-Tamil action film Raaka with Allu Arjun and Deepika Padukone.

== Media image ==
Kapoor in 2024

Kapoor has been placed in Rediff.com's "Best Actresses" list in 2020 and 2022. She is an endorser for several brands and products, such as Nykaa, Drools and Aldo. Kapoor has frequently featured in The Times of India's list of most desirable women, ranking 28th in 2018, 24th in 2019, and 18th in 2020. In 2020, Eastern Eye featured Kapoor in their dynamic dozen for the decade list.

== Filmography ==
=== Films ===
Key
†	Denotes films that have not yet been released

- All films are in Hindi unless otherwise noted.

Year	Title	Role	Notes	Ref.
2018	Dhadak	Parthavi Singh Rathore		
2020	Ghost Stories	Sameera	Zoya Akhtar's segment	
2020	Gunjan Saxena: The Kargil Girl	Gunjan Saxena		
2021	Roohi	Roohi Arora / Afzana Bedi (Note: Kapoor played dual roles in the film.)		
2022	Good Luck Jerry	Jaya "Jerry" Kumari		
2022	Mili	Mili Naudiyal		
2023	Bawaal	Nisha Dixit		
2023	Rocky Aur Rani Kii Prem Kahaani	Unnamed	Special appearance in song "Heart Throb"	
2024	Teri Baaton Mein Aisa Uljha Jiya	Jiah	Special appearance	
2024	Mr. & Mrs. Mahi	Mahima "Mahi" Aggarwal		
2024	Ulajh	Suhana Bhatia		
2024	Devara: Part 1	Thangam	Telugu film	
2025	Homebound	Sudha Bharti		
2025	Param Sundari	Thekkepattu "Sundari" Damodharan Pillai		
2025	Sunny Sanskari Ki Tulsi Kumari	Tulsi Kumari		
2026	Peddi	Achiyyamma	Telugu film	
2027	Lag Ja Gale †	TBA	Filming	
2027	Raaka †	TBA	Telugu film; Filming	
2027	Untitled next †	TBA	Filming	

=== Music video appearances ===
Year	Title	Performers	Ref.
2020	"Kudi Nu Nachne De"	Vishal Dadlani, Sachin–Jigar	

== Awards and nominations ==
Year	Award	Category	Work	Result	Ref.
2018	Lokmat Stylish Awards	Stylish Debutant of the Year	—N/a	Won	
2019	Filmfare Awards	Best Female Debut	Dhadak	Nominated	
2019	IIFA Awards	Star Debut of the Year – Female	Dhadak	Nominated	
2019	Zee Cine Awards	Best Female Debut	Dhadak	Won	
2020	Filmfare Awards	Best Actress	Gunjan Saxena: The Kargil Girl	Nominated	
2022	Pinkvilla Style Icons Awards	Super Stylish Youth Idol – Female	—N/a	Won	
2023	Bollywood Hungama Style Icons	Stylish Iconic Performer – Female	—N/a	Nominated	
2023	Bollywood Hungama Style Icons	Stylish Youth Icon – Female	—N/a	Won	
2023	Pinkvilla Style Icons Awards	Style Icon of the Year – Reader's Choice	—N/a	Won	
2023	Filmfare Awards	Best Actress	Mili	Nominated	
2023	Zee Cine Awards	Best Actress (Critics)	Mili	Nominated	
2023	Filmfare OTT Awards	Best Actress (Web Original Film)	Bawaal	Nominated	
2024	Pinkvilla Screen and Style Icons Awards	Best Actress (OTT) – Popular Choice	Bawaal	Won	
2024	News18 Reel Awards	Best Actress	Bawaal	Nominated	
2024	News18 Reel Awards	Breakthrough Performance of the Year – Female	Bawaal	Won	
2025	News18 Reel Awards	Best Actress Female	Ulajh	Nominated	
2025	13th South Indian International Movie Awards	Best Female Debut	Devara Part 1	Nominated	
2025	NDTV Indian of the Year	Actress of The Year	Param Sundari, Sunny Sanskari Ki Tulsi Kumari, Homebound	Won	
2026	Zee Cine Awards	Best Actress (Critics)	Homebound	Nominated	
