= List of accolades received by Kal Ho Naa Ho =

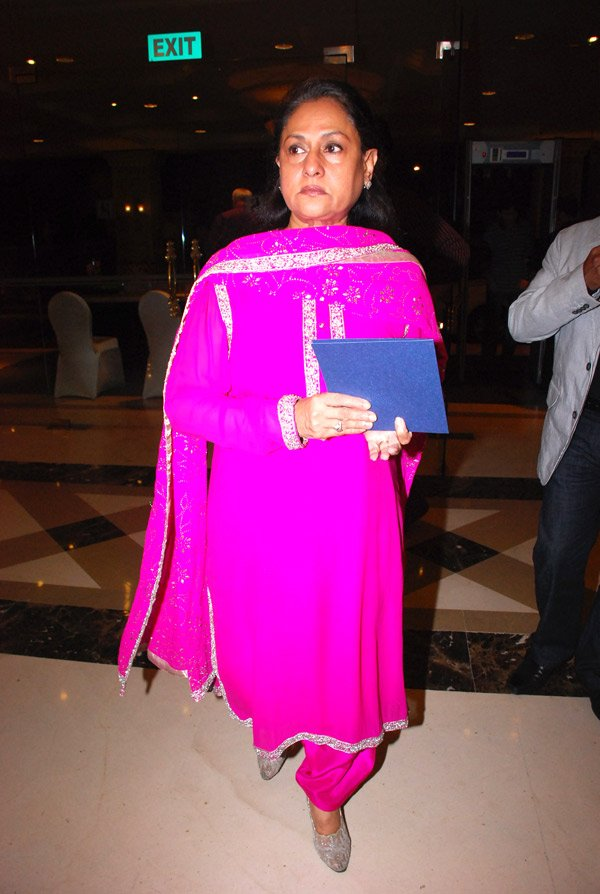
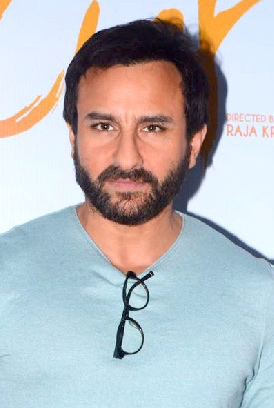
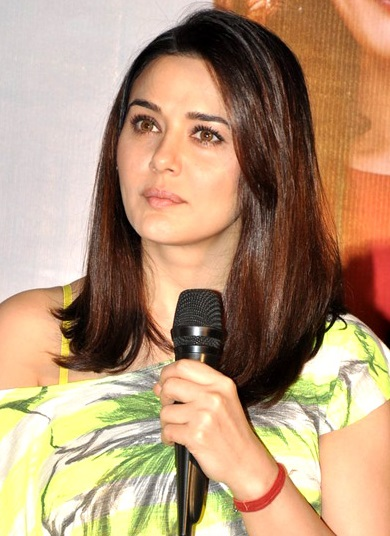
- Jaya Bachchan, Saif Ali Khan and Preity Zinta garnered several awards and nominations for their performances in Kal Ho Naa Ho.
Accolades
Award	Won	Nominated
Filmfare Awards	8	11
International Indian Film Academy Awards	13	17
National Film Awards	2	2
Producers Guild Film Awards	6	18
Screen Awards	3	16
Stardust Awards	1	1
Zee Cine Awards	2	13
- Total number of awards and nominations (Note: Awards in certain categories do not have prior nominations and only winners are announced by the jury. For simplification and to avoid errors, each award in this list has been presumed to have had a prior nomination.)
Totals	35	78
- References

Kal Ho Naa Ho (transl. Tomorrow May Never Come) is a 2003 Indian Hindi-language romantic comedy-drama film directed by Nikkhil Advani. The film stars Jaya Bachchan, Shah Rukh Khan, Saif Ali Khan and Preity Zinta. Sushma Seth, Reema Lagoo, Lillete Dubey and Delnaaz Irani play supporting roles. The film's story focuses on Naina Catherine Kapur (Preity Zinta), an MBA student who falls in love with Aman Mathur (Shah Rukh Khan). He does not reciprocate her feelings as he is a terminally ill heart patient, a fact he hides from Naina. Aman does not wish to bring Naina any pain through his illness, and tries to make her fall in love with her friend and fellow MBA classmate Rohit Patel (Saif Ali Khan). The film's dialogues were written by Niranjan Iyengar while Karan Johar drafted the story and screenplay. The latter also co-produced the film with his father, Yash Johar, under the Dharma Productions banner. The soundtrack for Kal Ho Naa Ho was composed by Shankar–Ehsaan–Loy while Javed Akhtar wrote the lyrics for its songs. Anil Mehta and Sanjay Sankla handled the cinematography and editing respectively. Sharmishta Roy was in charge of the production design.

Produced on a budget of ₹280 million, (Note: The average exchange rate in 2003 was 45.66 Indian rupees (₹) per 1 US dollar (US$).) Kal Ho Naa Ho was released on 27 November 2003 and received positive reviews from critics. It was a commercial success, grossing ₹860.9 million worldwide. The film won 35 awards from 78 nominations; its direction, story, screenplay, performances of the cast members, music and cinematography have received the most attention from award groups.

At the 51st National Film Awards, Shankar–Ehsaan–Loy and Sonu Nigam won for Best Music Direction and Best Male Playback Singer respectively. Kal Ho Naa Ho led the 49th Filmfare Awards with 11 nominations including Best Film (Karan Johar, Yash Johar), Best Director (Nikkhil Advani) and Best Actor (Shah Rukh Khan). It went on to win in eight categories, including Best Actress (Zinta), Best Supporting Actor (Saif Ali Khan) and Best Supporting Actress (Bachchan). The film won 13 awards out of 17 nominations at the 5th IIFA Awards, including Best Film (Karan Johar, Yash Johar), Best Actress (Zinta), Best Supporting Actor (Saif Ali Khan) and Best Supporting Actress (Bachchan). It garnered 18 nominations at the inaugural ceremony of the Producers Guild Film Awards and won six, Best Actress in a Supporting Role (Bachchan), Best Music Director (Shankar–Ehsaan–Loy), Best Lyricist (Akhtar), Best Male Playback Singer (Sonu Nigam), Best Debut Director (Advani) and Best Cinematography (Mehta). Among other wins, Kal Ho Naa Ho received three Screen Awards, two Zee Cine Awards and a Stardust Award.

== Awards and nominations ==
Award	Date of ceremony (Note: Date is linked to the article about the awards held that year, wherever possible.)	Category	Recipient(s) and nominee(s)	Result	Ref.
National Film Awards	3 February 2005	Best Music Direction	Shankar–Ehsaan–Loy	Won	
National Film Awards	3 February 2005	Best Male Playback Singer	Sonu Nigam for "Kal Ho Naa Ho"	Won	
Filmfare Awards	20 February 2004	Best Film	Karan Johar, Yash Johar	Nominated	
Filmfare Awards	20 February 2004	Best Director	Nikkhil Advani	Nominated	
Filmfare Awards	20 February 2004	Best Actor	Shah Rukh Khan	Nominated	
Filmfare Awards	20 February 2004	Best Actress	Preity Zinta	Won	
Filmfare Awards	20 February 2004	Best Supporting Actor	Saif Ali Khan	Won	
Filmfare Awards	20 February 2004	Best Supporting Actress	Jaya Bachchan	Won	
Filmfare Awards	20 February 2004	Best Music Director	Shankar–Ehsaan–Loy	Won	
Filmfare Awards	20 February 2004	Best Lyricist	Javed Akhtar	Won	
Filmfare Awards	20 February 2004	Best Male Playback Singer	Sonu Nigam for "Kal Ho Naa Ho"	Won	
Filmfare Awards	20 February 2004	Best Female Playback Singer	Alka Yagnik for "Kal Ho Naa Ho" (sad version)	Nominated	
Filmfare Awards	20 February 2004	Best Scene of the Year	"The Diary Scene"	Won	
Filmfare Awards	20 February 2004	Motolook of the Year	Preity Zinta	Won	
Filmfare Awards	20 February 2004	Motolook of the Year	Saif Ali Khan	Nominated	
International Indian Film Academy Awards	20–22 May 2004	Best Film	Karan Johar, Yash Johar	Won	
International Indian Film Academy Awards	20–22 May 2004	Best Director	Nikkhil Advani	Nominated	
International Indian Film Academy Awards	20–22 May 2004	Best Actor	Shah Rukh Khan	Nominated	
International Indian Film Academy Awards	20–22 May 2004	Best Actress	Preity Zinta	Won	
International Indian Film Academy Awards	20–22 May 2004	Best Supporting Actor	Saif Ali Khan	Won	
International Indian Film Academy Awards	20–22 May 2004	Best Supporting Actress	Jaya Bachchan	Won	
International Indian Film Academy Awards	20–22 May 2004	Best Music Director	Shankar–Ehsaan–Loy	Won	
International Indian Film Academy Awards	20–22 May 2004	Best Lyricist	Javed Akhtar	Won	
International Indian Film Academy Awards	20–22 May 2004	Best Male Playback Singer	Sonu Nigam for "Kal Ho Naa Ho"	Won	
International Indian Film Academy Awards	20–22 May 2004	Best Female Playback Singer	Alka Yagnik for "Kal Ho Naa Ho" (sad version)	Nominated	
International Indian Film Academy Awards	20–22 May 2004	Best Story	Karan Johar	Won	
International Indian Film Academy Awards	20–22 May 2004	Best Cinematography	Anil Mehta	Won	
International Indian Film Academy Awards	20–22 May 2004	Best Choreography	Farah Khan for "Maahi Ve"	Won	
International Indian Film Academy Awards	20–22 May 2004	Best Background Score	Shankar–Ehsaan–Loy	Won	
International Indian Film Academy Awards	20–22 May 2004	Best Editing	Sanjay Sankla	Nominated	
International Indian Film Academy Awards	20–22 May 2004	Best Costume Design	Manish Malhotra	Won	
International Indian Film Academy Awards	20–22 May 2004	Best Makeup	Mickey Contractor	Won	
Producers Guild Film Awards	29 May 2004	Best Film	Karan Johar, Yash Johar	Nominated	
Producers Guild Film Awards	29 May 2004	Best Director	Nikkhil Advani	Nominated	
Producers Guild Film Awards	29 May 2004	Best Actor in a Leading Role	Shah Rukh Khan	Nominated	
Producers Guild Film Awards	29 May 2004	Best Actress in a Leading Role	Preity Zinta	Nominated	
Producers Guild Film Awards	29 May 2004	Best Actor in a Supporting Role	Saif Ali Khan	Nominated	
Producers Guild Film Awards	29 May 2004	Best Actress in a Supporting Role	Jaya Bachchan	Won	
Producers Guild Film Awards	29 May 2004	Best Music Director	Shankar–Ehsaan–Loy	Won	
Producers Guild Film Awards	29 May 2004	Best Lyricist	Javed Akhtar	Won	
Producers Guild Film Awards	29 May 2004	Best Male Playback Singer	Sonu Nigam for "Kal Ho Naa Ho"	Won	
Producers Guild Film Awards	29 May 2004	Best Female Playback Singer	Vasundhara Das for "It's The Time To Disco"	Nominated	
Producers Guild Film Awards	29 May 2004	Best Debut Director	Nikkhil Advani	Won	
Producers Guild Film Awards	29 May 2004	Best Screenplay	Karan Johar	Nominated	
Producers Guild Film Awards	29 May 2004	Best Cinematography	Anil Mehta	Won	
Producers Guild Film Awards	29 May 2004	Best Editing	Sanjay Sankla	Nominated	
Producers Guild Film Awards	29 May 2004	Best Art Design	Sharmishta Roy	Nominated	
Producers Guild Film Awards	29 May 2004	Best Sound Recording	Anuj Mathur	Nominated	
Producers Guild Film Awards	29 May 2004	Best Costume Design	Manish Malhotra	Nominated	
Producers Guild Film Awards	29 May 2004	Best Special Effects	Tata Elxsi	Nominated	
Screen Awards	17 January 2004	Best Film	Karan Johar, Yash Johar	Nominated	
Screen Awards	17 January 2004	Best Director	Nikkhil Advani	Nominated	
Screen Awards	17 January 2004	Best Actor	Shah Rukh Khan	Nominated	
Screen Awards	17 January 2004	Best Actress	Preity Zinta	Nominated	
Screen Awards	17 January 2004	Best Supporting Actor	Saif Ali Khan	Won	
Screen Awards	17 January 2004	Best Supporting Actress	Jaya Bachchan	Nominated	
Screen Awards	17 January 2004	Best Music Director	Shankar–Ehsaan–Loy	Nominated	
Screen Awards	17 January 2004	Best Lyricist	Javed Akhtar	Nominated	
Screen Awards	17 January 2004	Best Male Playback Singer	Sonu Nigam for "Kal Ho Naa Ho"	Nominated	
Screen Awards	17 January 2004	Best Screenplay	Karan Johar	Won	
Screen Awards	17 January 2004	Best Dialogue	Niranjan Iyengar	Nominated	
Screen Awards	17 January 2004	Best Editing	Sanjay Sankla	Won	
Screen Awards	17 January 2004	Best Sound Recording	Anuj Mathur	Nominated	
Screen Awards	17 January 2004	Best Cinematography	Anil Mehta	Nominated	
Screen Awards	17 January 2004	Best Art Direction	Sharmishta Roy	Nominated	
Screen Awards	17 January 2004	Best Choreography	Farah Khan for "Maahi Ve"	Nominated	
Stardust Awards	4 February 2004	Actor of the Year – Female	Preity Zinta	Won	
Zee Cine Awards	26 February 2004	Best Film	Karan Johar, Yash Johar	Nominated	
Zee Cine Awards	26 February 2004	Best Director	Nikkhil Advani	Nominated	
Zee Cine Awards	26 February 2004	Best Actor – Male	Shah Rukh Khan	Nominated	
Zee Cine Awards	26 February 2004	Best Actor – Female	Preity Zinta	Nominated	
Zee Cine Awards	26 February 2004	Best Actor in a Supporting Role – Male	Saif Ali Khan	Won	
Zee Cine Awards	26 February 2004	Best Actor in a Supporting Role – Female	Jaya Bachchan	Nominated	
Zee Cine Awards	26 February 2004	Best Music Director	Shankar–Ehsaan–Loy	Nominated	
Zee Cine Awards	26 February 2004	Best Track of the Year	"Kal Ho Naa Ho"	Won	
Zee Cine Awards	26 February 2004	Best Track of the Year	"Maahi Ve"	Nominated	
Zee Cine Awards	26 February 2004	Best Audiography	Anuj Mathur	Nominated	
Zee Cine Awards	26 February 2004	Best Choreography	Farah Khan for "Maahi Ve"	Nominated	
Zee Cine Awards	26 February 2004	Best Dialogue	Niranjan Iyengar	Nominated	
Zee Cine Awards	26 February 2004	Best Editing	Sanjay Sankla	Nominated	

== See also ==
- List of Bollywood films of 2003
