= List of awards and nominations received by Karan Johar =

Karan Johar awards and nominations
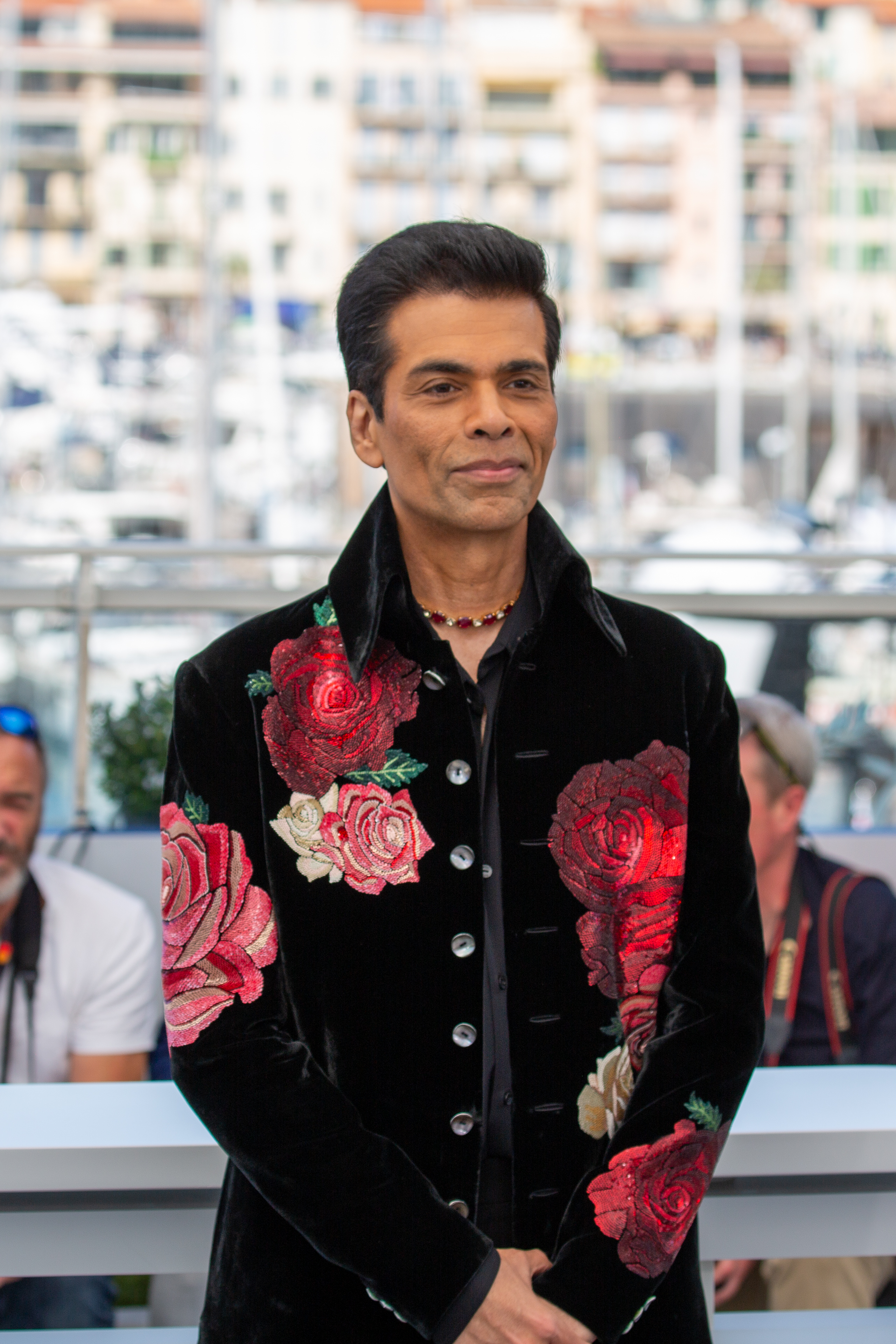
- Johar at the 2025 Cannes Film Festival
Awards and nominations
Award	Wins	Nominations
Filmfare Awards	8	0
Screen Awards	2	0
Zee Cine Awards	1	0
National Film Awards	4	–
IIFA Awards	3	0
Producers Guild Film Awards	0	0
Mirchi Music Awards	1	0
Stardust Awards	0	0
Others	2	–
Honors	4	0

Totals (Note: Certain award groups do not simply award one winner. They acknowledge several different recipients, have runners-up, and have third place. Since this is a specific recognition and is different from losing an award, runner-up mentions are considered wins in this award tally. For simplification and to avoid errors, each award in this list has been presumed to have had a prior nomination.)
- Wins: 24
- Nominations: 15

Karan Johar is an Indian filmmaker and television personality who works in Hindi Cinema. He has won several awards, including four National Film Awards and eight Filmfare Awards. In 2020, the Government of India honoured him with Padma Shri, the country's fourth highest civilian award.

Johar made his directorial debut with the romantic comedy-drama Kuch Kuch Hota Hai (1998), which earned him the National Film Award for Best Popular Film Providing Wholesome Entertainment, for his director role and the Filmfare Awards for Best Director and Best Screenplay. His next two films were the ensemble dramas Kabhi Khushi Kabhie Gham (2001) and Kabhi Alvida Naa Kehna (2006), which were both very successful in domestic and overseas markets. His social drama My Name Is Khan (2010) earned him his second Filmfare Award for Best Director. Johar produced the spy thriller Raazi (2018) and the biopic Shershaah (2021), both of which won him the Filmfare Award for Best Film, with the latter also earning him the National Film Award – Special Jury Mention as producer. Later, as producer of the fantasy film Brahmāstra: Part One – Shiva (2022), he won the inaugural National Film Award for Best Film in AVGC. His romantic comedy-drama Rocky Aur Rani Kii Prem Kahaani (2023) earned him another National Film Award for Best Popular Film Providing Wholesome Entertainment. These, along with the several successful films he has produced under the Dharma Productions banner, have established him as one of the leading director-producers in Hindi cinema.

== Awards and nominations ==
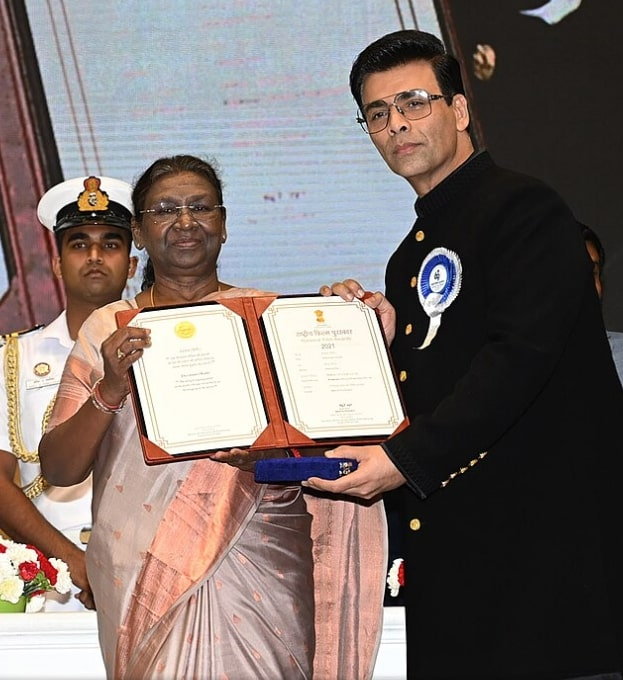
Johar being awarded National Film Award for Shershaah, c. 2023

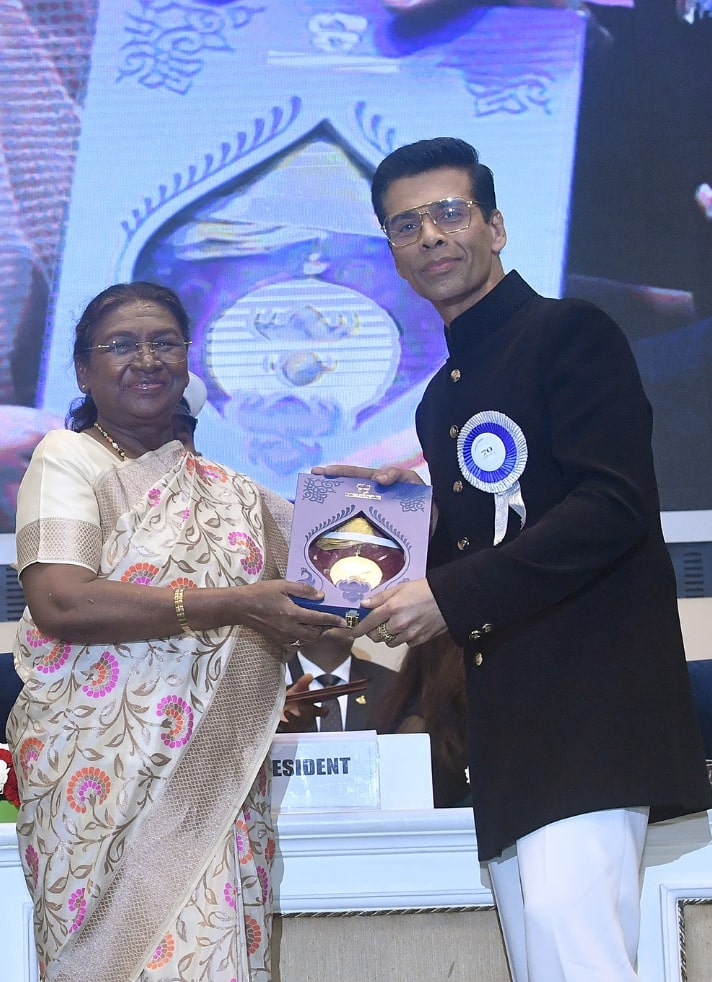
Johar being awarded National Film Award for Brahmāstra: Part One – Shiva, c. 2024

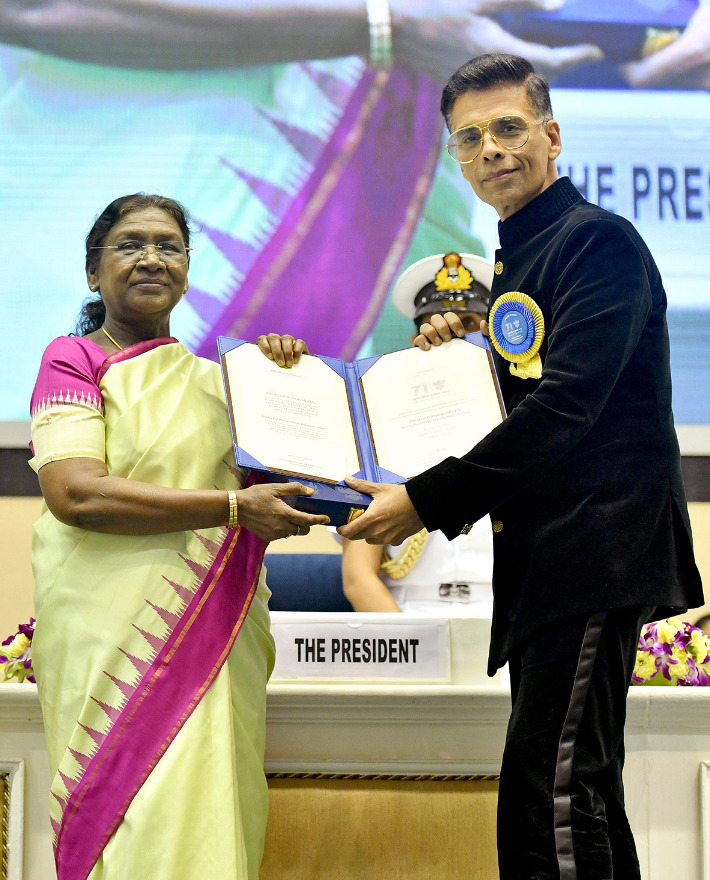
Johar being awarded National Film Award for Rocky Aur Rani Kii Prem Kahaani, c. 2025

Year	Notable work	Awards	Category	Result	Ref.
1999	Kuch Kuch Hota Hai	Filmfare Awards	Best Director	Won	
1999	Kuch Kuch Hota Hai	Filmfare Awards	Best Screenplay	Won	
1999	Kuch Kuch Hota Hai	Screen Awards	Best Director	Won	
1999	Kuch Kuch Hota Hai	Zee Cine Awards	Best Director	Won	
2000	Kuch Kuch Hota Hai	National Film Awards	Best Popular Film Providing Wholesome Entertainment	Won	
2001	Mohabbatein	IIFA Awards	Best Costume Design	Won	
2002	Kabhi Khushi Kabhie Gham	Filmfare Awards	Best Director	Nominated	
2002	Kabhi Khushi Kabhie Gham	Filmfare Awards	Best Dialogue	Won	
2002	Kabhi Khushi Kabhie Gham	Filmfare Awards	Best Scene	Won	
2002	Kabhi Khushi Kabhie Gham	IIFA Awards	Best Director	Nominated	
2002	Kabhi Khushi Kabhie Gham	IIFA Awards	Best Dialogue	Won	
2002	Kabhi Khushi Kabhie Gham	Screen Awards	Best Director	Nominated	
2004	Kal Ho Naa Ho	Filmfare Awards	Best Film	Nominated	
2004	Kal Ho Naa Ho	IIFA Awards	Best Story	Won	
2004	Kal Ho Naa Ho	Screen Awards	Best Film	Nominated	
2004	Kal Ho Naa Ho	Screen Awards	Best Screenplay	Won	
2005	Koffee with Karan	Indian Telly Awards	Best Anchor	Nominated	
2007	Koffee with Karan	Indian Telly Awards	Best Anchor	Nominated	
2007	Koffee with Karan	Indian Television Academy Awards	Best Anchor – Talk/Chat Show	Won	
2007	Kabhi Alvida Naa Kehna	Filmfare Awards	Best Film	Nominated	
2007	Kabhi Alvida Naa Kehna	Filmfare Awards	Best Director	Nominated	
2007	Kabhi Alvida Naa Kehna	IIFA Awards	Best Director	Nominated	
2008	Om Shanti Om	IIFA Awards	Best Costume Design	Won	
2009	Dostana	Filmfare Awards	Best Film	Nominated	
2010	Wake Up Sid	Filmfare Awards	Best Film	Nominated	
2011	My Name Is Khan	Filmfare Awards	Best Director	Won	
2011	My Name Is Khan	IIFA Awards	Best Director	Won	
2011	My Name Is Khan	Producers Guild Film Awards	Best Director	Won	
2011	My Name Is Khan	Zee Cine Awards	Best Director	Won	
2011	My Name Is Khan	Zee Cine Awards	Best Story	Won	
2012	Koffee with Karan	Indian Telly Awards	Best Anchor	Nominated	
2013	Student of the Year	Producers Guild Film Awards	President's Honour	Won	
2013	Student of the Year	Stardust Awards	Dream Director	Won	
2013	Ajeeb Dastaan Hai Yeh (Bombay Talkies)	2013 Cannes	Queer Palm	Nominated	
2014	Yeh Jawaani Hai Deewani	Filmfare Awards	Best Film	Nominated	
2017	Kapoor & Sons	Filmfare Awards	Best Film	Nominated	
2017	Ae Dil Hai Mushkil	Filmfare Awards	Best Director	Nominated	
2017	—N/a	Mirchi Music Awards	Make It Large Award	Won	
2019	Raazi	Filmfare Awards	Best Film	Won	
2022	Shershaah	National Film Awards	Special Jury Award (Feature Film)	Won	
2022	Shershaah	Filmfare Awards	Best Film	Won	
2023	Rocky Aur Rani Kii Prem Kahaani	GQ Men of the Year Awards	Director of the Year	Won	
2023	Rocky Aur Rani Kii Prem Kahaani	River to River Florence Indian Film Festival	Best Feature Film	Won	
2024	Rocky Aur Rani Kii Prem Kahaani	Filmfare Awards	Best Film	Nominated	
2024	Rocky Aur Rani Kii Prem Kahaani	Filmfare Awards	Best Director	Nominated	
2024	Brahmāstra: Part One – Shiva	National Film Awards	Best Film in AVGC	Won	
2025	Rocky Aur Rani Kii Prem Kahaani	National Film Awards	Best Popular Film Providing Wholesome Entertainment	Won	
2025	—N/a	Filmfare Awards	Special Award	Won	

== Honors ==
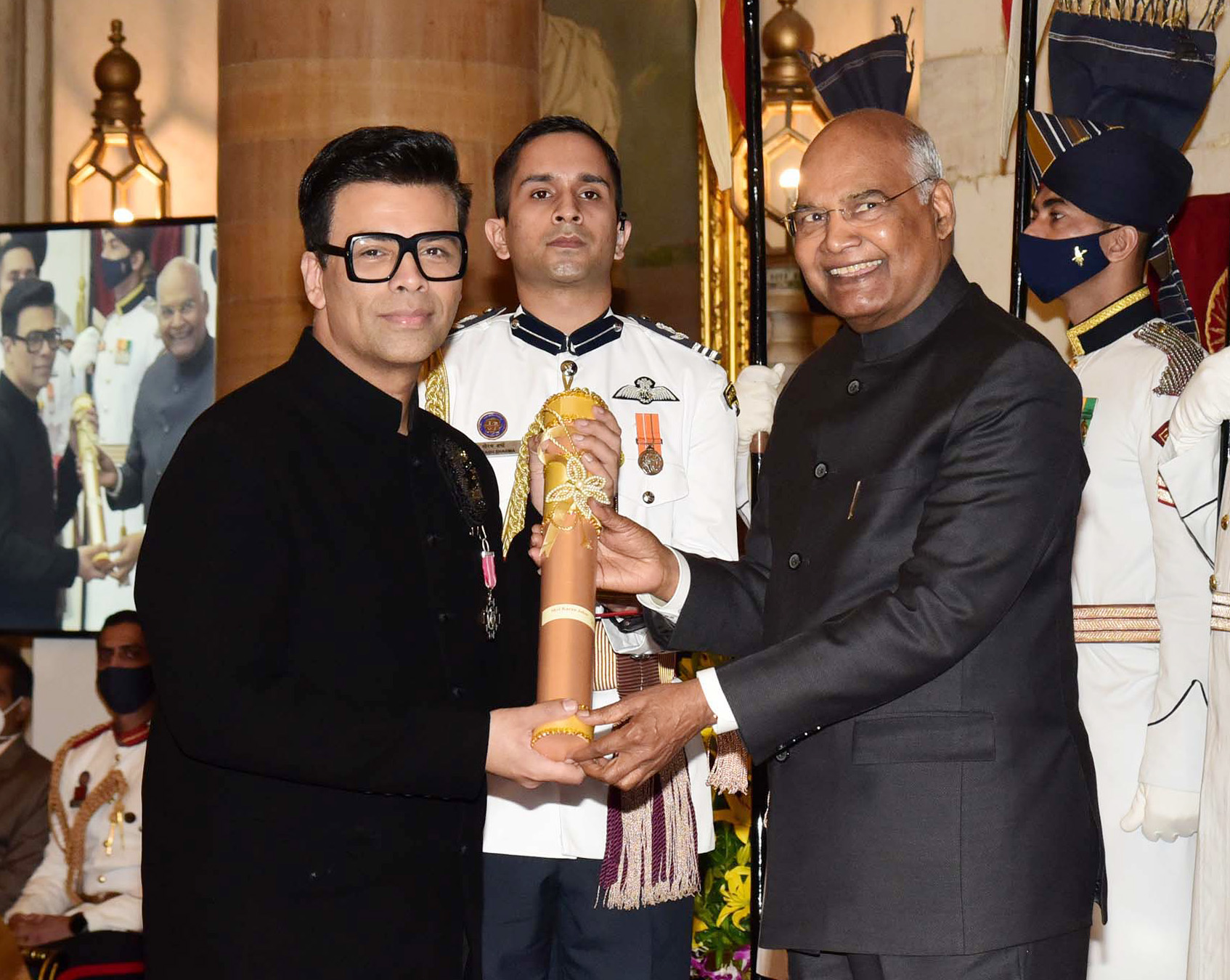
Johar being awarded Padma Shri, c. 2021

- On 30 September 2006, Johar became the first Indian filmmaker to be a jury member in the Miss World competition, in Warsaw, Poland.
- In 2007, Johar was chosen as one of 250 Global Young Leaders by the Geneva-based World Economic Forum 2006.
- He was the only other Indian, apart from PM Manmohan Singh to be invited for the opening ceremony of the London Olympics.
- In 2017, Johar was invited as cultural leader in World Economic Forum.
- On 25 January 2020, his name was announced for the Padma Shri award, India's fourth highest civilian honour in the field of Arts.
- On 11 August 2023, Johar was honoured at the Indian Film Festival of Melbourne for completing twenty-five years as a filmmaker and his contributions.
- On 2 December 2023, Johar was awarded with the Variety International Vanguard Director Award at the 2023 Red Sea International Film Festival.
- On 11 May 2024, Johar was bestowed with the 'Gold Legend Honor' at the Gold Gala 2024.
- On 28 September 2024, Johar was honoured with the IIFA Award for Outstanding Achievement in Indian cinema on completing twenty-five years in Indian cinema.

== See also ==
- List of accolades received by Kal Ho Naa Ho
- List of accolades received by Kabhi Alvida Naa Kehna
- List of accolades received by My Name Is Khan
