= Gumrah (1993 film) =

- Promotional poster
- Directed by: Mahesh Bhatt
- Written by: Sujit Sen; Robin Bhatt
- Produced by: Yash Johar
- Starring: Sanjay Dutt; Sridevi; Anupam Kher; Rahul Roy
- Cinematography: Pravin Bhatt
- Edited by: Sanjay Sankla
- Music by: Laxmikant–Pyarelal
- Production company: Dharma Productions
- Release date: 3 August 1993
- Running time: 150 minutes
- Country: India
- Language: Hindi
- Box office: ₹12 crore

Gumrah (Hindi pronunciation: [ɡʊmraːɦ], transl. Mislead) is a 1993 Indian Hindi-language action crime drama film directed by Mahesh Bhatt and written jointly by Sujit Sen and Robin Bhatt. It stars Sanjay Dutt, Sridevi, Anupam Kher, and Rahul Roy. In the film, Roshni (Sridevi), an aspiring singer, is assisted by Rahul Malhotra (Roy) in flourishing her career and they fall in love. However, on a trip to Hong Kong, she is abandoned by him and later arrested by the police for supposed involvement in trafficking cocaine.

Gumrah was loosely based on the Australian miniseries Bangkok Hilton, and was produced by Yash Johar under the Dharma Productions banner. Pravin Bhatt acted as the film's cinematographer, while Sanjay Sankla handled the editing. The duo Laxmikant–Pyarelal composed the film's music, with lyrics penned by Anand Bakshi.

Sridevi earned her a nomination for Best Actress at the 39th Filmfare Awards.

== Plot ==
Roshni is the only child of Sharda Chadda. Her father, Prakash Chadda, left before she was born, and she has no knowledge of where he went. After her mother learns she has a fatal illness, she asks her family friend to take Roshni to Mumbai, so that she learns to live without her and be independent.

Roshni is introduced to Rahul Malhotra, and they share a mutual attraction. When he learns that she is an aspiring singer, he assists in her career, so she becomes popular. She has a devoted fan named Jagannath, alias Jaggu, who is a petty thief. He is in love with her, but she rejects him.

Roshni's mother reveals on her deathbed that Roshni's father is alive and had been forced to abandon his family over a government level criminal accusations exacerbated by Roshni's grandmother's reluctance to allow him back home. She tells Roshni that she is free to go find her father. During a trip, she and Rahul take to Hong Kong to look for her father, Roshni is arrested for trafficking cocaine, and Rahul disappears. Jaggu brings an attorney, but she is quickly found guilty and sentenced to death, remanded to a prison where inmates are kept barefoot and in squalid conditions. Jaggu visits the prison and runs afoul of two guards, themselves lovers, who beat him in front of Roshni. The attorney works to help them escape. A fight ensues between Roshni and the female guard, in which the latter is killed. The warden intervenes and is killed by Jaggu, they escape and return to India.

At the airport, when Prakash is questioned by the police, Roshni learns that he is her father, and that he had fled the country years earlier when he had been wrongfully accused of treason. Later at Rahul's house, Rahul admits that he had been dealing with drugs that resulted in Roshni's arrest. She slaps him for deceiving her and gets him arrested. With Prakash's blessings, Roshni and Jaggu get married.

== Cast ==
- Sanjay Dutt as Jagan Nath "Jaggu"
- Sridevi as Roshni Chadha
- Anupam Kher as Prakash Chadha, Roshni's father.
- Rahul Roy as Rahul Malhotra
- Soni Razdan as Angela
- Reema Lagoo as Sharda Chadha, Roshni's mother.
- Kunickaa Sadanand as Female cop in Hong Kong
- Tom Alter as Inspector Phillip
- Sudesh Issar
- Bob Christo as Male cop in Hong Kong
- Anang Desai as Ahuja
- Laxmikant Berde as Pakya
- Kamini Kaushal as Sharda's mother
- Avtaar Gill as Roshni's uncle
- Mushtaq Khan as Police inspector
- Mahesh Anand as Tiger, opposition fighter in Hong Kong.

== Production ==
During an episode of the reality show India's Next Superstars, Mahesh Bhatt shared that Sridevi shot for a sequence of the film in water despite having a high fever of 39 °C (102 °F). It was also reported that Reema Lagoo's role in the film was cut short only because Sridevi demanded for it; she felt that Lagoo's performance dominated over that of hers. Owing to this, Yash Johar promised to cast Lagoo in the role of the mother in all his subsequent films, which include Kuch Kuch Hota Hai and Kal Ho Na Ho.

== Soundtrack ==
Anand Bakshi wrote all songs. The soundtrack for the film was the second successive hit (after Khalnayak) for the music director duo Laxmikant–Pyarelal.

#	Title	Singer(s)
1	"Main Tera Ashiq Hoon"	Roop Kumar Rathod
2	"Yeh Zindagi Ka Safar"	Talat Aziz, Kavita Krishnamurthy
3	"Yeh Hai Sharabkhana"	Asha Bhosle
4	"Duniya Kismat Aur Khuda"	Roop Kumar Rathod
5	"Tere Pyar Ko Salam O Sanam"	Alka Yagnik
6	"Ram Kasam Mera Bada Naam Ho Gaya"	Vinod Rathod

== Reception ==
India Today wrote, "A timely reminder of what a fine actress Sridevi is. She plays a singer who is falsely charged with drug smuggling and imprisoned in Hong Kong. Unfortunately, the rest of the film can't quite match her performance."

When it screened in Nigeria, it is remarked that audiences loved and knew the film. "They cheered at tense points, thumping their seats and stamping their feet. At other points they mimicked dialogue and shouted out responses to the heroes and villains, the film was also well received at the Indian box office and was the seventh highest grossing Hindi film of 1993."
