= Producers Guild Film Award for Best Lyricist =

Annual Indian film award

Producers Guild Film Award for Best Music Director
- Awarded for: Best Lyricist of the Year
- Country: India
- Presented by: Film & Television Producers Guild
- First award: 2004 (for films released around 2003)
- Website: Producers Guild Film Awards

The Producers Guild Film Awards for Best Lyricist (previously known as the Apsara Award for Best Lyricist) is given by the producers of the film and television guild as part of its annual award ceremony to recognise the best Indian film of the year. Following its inception in 2004, no one was awarded in 2005 and 2007.

== Winner and nominees ==
=== 2000s ===
- 2004 Javed Akhtar - "Kal Ho Naa Ho" - Kal Ho Naa Ho
  - Ibrahim Ashq - "Koi Mil Gaya" - Koi... Mil Gaya
  - Javed Akhtar - "Seemaaye Bulaaye" - LOC Kargil
  - Gulzar - "Maar Udari" - Pinjar
- 2005 - no award
- 2006 Gulzar - "Kajra Re" - Bunty Aur Babli
  - Swanand Kirkire - "Piyu Bole" - Parineeta
  - Swanand Kirkire - "Baanwara Mann" - Hazaaron Khwaishein Aisi
  - Sayeed Quadri - "Bheegey Hont" - Murder
  - Javed Akhtar - "Do Pal" - Veer-Zaara
- 2007 - no award
- 2008 Gulzar - "Tere Bina" - Guru (2007 film)
  - Sayeed Quadri - "Maula Mera" - Anwar
  - Sandeep Nath - "Yoon Shabnami" - Saawariya
  - Sameer - "Jab Se Tere Naina" - Saawariya
  - Javed Akhtar - "Ajab Si" - Om Shanti Om
- 2009 Prasoon Joshi - "Maa" - Taare Zameen Par
  - Javed Akhtar - "Khwaja" - Jodhaa Akbar
  - Abbas Tyrewala - "Pappu Can't Dance" - Jaane Tu... Ya Jaane Na
  - Irfan Siddiqui - "Mar Jaava" - Fashion
  - Gulzar - "Tu Meri Dost Hain" - Yuvvraaj
