= What the Love! with Karan Johar =

- Starring: Rameez Rizvi; Samaksh Sudi; Sahil Brown
- Country of origin: India
- Original language: English
- No. of seasons: 1
- No. of episodes: 7

Production
- Running time: 45–50 minutes
- Production company: BBC Studios

Original release
- Network: Netflix
- Release: January 30, 2020

What the Love! with Karan Johar is a 2020 reality television series. The premise revolves around Karan Johar who tries to help six single people find love. It was released on January 30, 2020, on Netflix.

== Cast ==
- Rameez Rizvi
- Samaksh Sudi
- Sahil Brown
- Karan Johar

== Episodes ==
| No. | Title | Original release date |
|---|---|---|
| 1 | "The "What the Love!" Singles Party" | January 30, 2020 |
| 2 | "The Unsuitable Bride" | January 30, 2020 |
| 3 | "The Eager Beaver" | January 30, 2020 |
| 4 | "Mr. No Time for Love" | January 30, 2020 |
| 5 | "Ms. Date Me Not" | January 30, 2020 |
| 6 | "Ms. Heartbroken" | January 30, 2020 |
| 7 | "The Planner" | January 30, 2020 |
