= Kal Ho Naa Ho (song) =

Single by Sonu Nigam

from the album Kal Ho Naa Ho soundtrack
- Language: Hindi
- Released: 27 September 2003 (India)
- Genre: Romance, Filmi
- Length: 5:23
- Label: Sony Music
- Songwriters: Shankar–Ehsaan–Loy (music); Javed Akhtar (lyrics)
- Producer: Shankar–Ehsaan–Loy

Audio sample
- Kal Ho Naa Ho: file; help

"Kal Ho Naa Ho" (transl. Tomorrow May Never Come) is a Hindi-language film song performed by Sonu Nigam for the 2003 Indian romantic drama film of the same name. The track was composed by Shankar–Ehsaan–Loy, while lyrics were written by Javed Akhtar. In a pathos version, Nigam is joined by Alka Yagnik and Richa Sharma.

The music video of the song features the film leads Shah Rukh Khan, Saif Ali Khan, and Preity Zinta. The song was featured in Outlook's list of Bollywood's Timeless Melodies, making it the only contemporary selection on the list. It has become one of the most famous filmi songs of all time.

== Music video ==
The title track of Kal Ho Naa Ho directed by Nikhil Advani and written by Karan Johar, the music video features Aman (played by Shah Rukh) imagining himself in Rohit's (Saif Ali) place, romancing Naina (Zinta), and wistfully sings of life's unpredictability and making the most of life.

== Production ==
The theme of the song was composed by Loy Mendonsa of the Shankar-Ehsaan-Loy trio and Shankar Mahadevan arranged the groove.

Sonu Nigam was busy when the song was to be recorded. Instead of opting for some other singer, Karan Johar decided to wait for a month before Sonu came back and recorded the song for the movie. In a later interview, Nigam said:

“I believe every piece of art has its own destiny. I was meant to sing the biggest song in the history of Indian film music going by what Karan told me four months ago, and I can only thank God that the most loved song of all time came to me”

In a later interview in the documentary "Pancham unmixed", Shankar, Ehsaan and Loy revealed that the music of the segment "har pal yahaan" in the song was inspired by the music of R.D.Burman.

== Awards and reception ==
- National Film Award for Best Male Playback Singer - Sonu Nigam
- IIFA Best Male Playback Award - Sonu Nigam
- Filmfare Best Male Playback Award - Sonu Nigam
- IIFA Best Lyricist Award - Javed Akhtar
- Filmfare Best Lyricist Award - Javed Akhtar

The song was featured in Outlook magazine's 20 Best Hindi Film Songs Ever list. The jury was composed of celebrities such as Gulzar, Hariharan, Javed Akhtar, Kumar Sanu and Shantanu Moitra. Each jury member was asked to nominate 10 favorites and the songs the winners were ranked according to the number of votes each song got. "Kal Ho Naa Ho" was ranked at 19 making it the only contemporary selection in the list.

The track was featured in Hindustan Times's "Song of the Century" list, which described the song as "one of the most unforgettable tunes in recent times."

== Legacy ==
The song became immensely popular among Telugu audiences after an episode of Bigg Boss Telugu, Season 4 where Mehaboob Shaikh, a popular contestant, was eliminated, when, before leaving, he performed on the song.

The song was sampled by Afghan singer Qader Eshpari in his song Ba Man Bekhan from Naazi Jaan (2005).

In 2015 the German ambassador to India Michael Steiner released a video paying homage to the song, under the name Lebe jetzt!.
