= Yash Johar =

Indian film producer (1929–2004)

- Born: 6 September 1929; Amritsar, Punjab, British India (present-day Punjab, India)
- Died: 26 June 2004 (aged 74); Mumbai, Maharashtra, India
- Occupation: Film producer
- Years active: 1952–2004
- Organization: Dharma Productions
- Spouse: Hiroo Johar (m. 1971)
- Children: Karan Johar (son)
- Family: Johar family; Chopra family

Yash Johar (6 September 1929 – 26 June 2004) was an Indian film producer and the founder of Dharma Productions. His films were known for their lavish sets, exotic locations, and emphasis on Indian traditions and family values. He was the father of Karan Johar, a prominent filmmaker who founded Dharma Productions.

== Personal life ==
Yash Johar was born on 6 September 1929 in Amritsar, Punjab, in a Punjabi Hindu family associated with the Arya Samaj. He married Hiroo Johar, the sister of filmmaker Yash Chopra, in 1971. Their son, Karan Johar, born in 1972, inherited his father’s legacy and expanded Dharma Productions into one of India’s leading production houses. Yash Johar died on 26 June 2004 in Mumbai, aged 74, due to a chest infection, while also battling cancer.

== Career ==
Yash Johar began his career in the early 1950s as a publicist and still photographer, working with Sashadhar Mukherjee’s Filmistan studio. He served as a production executive on Love in Simla (1960) and later joined Sunil Dutt’s Ajanta Arts in 1962, managing production for films such as Mujhe Jeene Do (1963) and Yeh Raaste Hain Pyaar Ke (1963). His collaboration with Dev Anand’s Navketan Films was pivotal, where he handled production for successful films like Guide (1965), Jewel Thief (1967), Prem Pujari (1970), and Hare Rama Hare Krishna (1971), establishing his reputation as a skilled production controller.

In 1971, Johar accompanied martial arts star Bruce Lee and actor James Coburn on a location scouting trip in India for a film that was never produced, showcasing his early international exposure. In 1976, he founded Dharma Productions, which became known for its emotionally resonant, family-oriented films with high production values. The company’s first film, Dostana (1980), directed by Raj Khosla, was a box-office success. Subsequent productions like Duniya (1984), Agneepath (1990), Gumrah (1993), and Duplicate (1998) solidified Dharma’s reputation.

Johar also served as an associate producer on the Hollywood film The Jungle Book (1994), expanding his influence beyond Indian cinema. The 1998 film Kuch Kuch Hota Hai, directed by his son Karan Johar, marked a turning point, becoming a cultural and commercial phenomenon, winning the National Film Award for Best Popular Film Providing Wholesome Entertainment. This was followed by Kabhi Khushi Kabhie Gham (2001), another major success.

== Selected filmography ==
=== Producer ===
- Dostana (1980)
- Duniya (1984)
- Muqaddar Ka Faisla (1987)
- Agneepath (1990)
- Gumrah (1993)
- Duplicate (1998)
- Kuch Kuch Hota Hai (1998)
- Kabhi Khushi Kabhie Gham (2001)
- Kal Ho Naa Ho (2003)
- Phir Bhi Dil Hai Hindustani (2000) (co-producer, Dreamz Unlimited)

=== Associate Producer ===
- Guide (1965)
- Jewel Thief (1967)
- Prem Pujari (1970)
- Hare Rama Hare Krishna (1971)
- The Jungle Book (1994)

== See also ==
- Cinema of India
- Lists of Indians by state
- Dharma Productions
