= Kabhi Khushi Kabhie Gham =

2001 Indian film by Karan Johar

- Directed by: Karan Johar
- Written by: Karan Johar; Sheena Parikh
- Produced by: Yash Johar
- Starring: Amitabh Bachchan; Jaya Bachchan; Shah Rukh Khan; Kajol; Hrithik Roshan; Kareena Kapoor; Rani Mukerji
- Cinematography: Kiran Deohans
- Edited by: Sanjay Sankla
- Music by: Songs: Jatin-Lalit; Sandesh Shandilya; Aadesh Shrivastava; Score: Babloo Chakravorty
- Production company: Dharma Productions
- Distributed by: Yash Raj Films
- Release date: 14 December 2001
- Running time: 210 minutes
- Country: India
- Language: Hindi
- Budget: ₹40 crore
- Box office: ₹136 crore

Kabhi Khushi Kabhie Gham... (transl. Sometimes Happiness Sometimes Sadness...), also abbreviated as K3G, is a 2001 Indian Hindi-language family drama film written and directed by Karan Johar and produced by his father Yash Johar. Inspired by Yash Chopra's 1976 film Kabhi Kabhie, the core plot of the film is based on Bengali film Tumi Je Aamar (1994). It stars Amitabh Bachchan, Jaya Bachchan, Shah Rukh Khan, Kajol, Hrithik Roshan, and Kareena Kapoor, with Rani Mukerji in a extended guest appearance. The film follows a wealthy Indian family that becomes estranged when the adopted son is disowned by his father for marrying a woman of lower socio-economic status, leading to years of separation and eventual reconciliation.

Johar began developing the film shortly after the release of his directorial debut Kuch Kuch Hota Hai (1998). Principal photography commenced on 16 October 2000 and took place across locations in India, the United Kingdom, and Egypt. Promoted with the tagline "It's All About Loving Your Parents", the film featured a lavish visual style and combined traditional family values with contemporary production techniques. Made at a budget of ₹30 crore (US$3.1 million)–₹40 crore (US$4.2 million), it was the most expensive Indian film at the time. The soundtrack was composed by Jatin–Lalit, Sandesh Shandilya, and Aadesh Shrivastava, with lyrics written by Sameer and Anil Pandey.

Kabhie Khushi Kabhie Gham was theatrically released on 14 December 2001, and received mixed-to-positive reviews from critics who praised the performances—particularly those of Kajol, Kapoor and Jaya Bachchan—alongside its production design, music, costume design, and emotional appeal, though its extended runtime and melodramatic tone were criticized. It emerged as one of the highest grossing Indian films ever, earning ₹1.36 billion (US$29 million) worldwide.

At the 47th Filmfare Awards, it won five awards, including Best Actress (Kajol Devgan) and Best Supporting Actress (Jaya Bachchan), and received several honors at the IIFA, Screen, and Zee Cine Awards.

Distributed in more than 100 countries, the film held the record for the highest-grossing Indian film in overseas markets until the release of Johar’s Kabhi Alvida Naa Kehna (2006).

== Plot ==
Yashvardhan "Yash" Raichand is a wealthy industrialist in Delhi who lives with his wife Nandini, their sons Rahul and Rohan, and other extended family members. Rahul, their elder son, discovers that he is adopted at the age of eight. Rahul grows up with a strong sense of duty to his parents and strives to meet their expectations.

As an adult, Rahul falls in love with Anjali Sharma, a lively young woman from Chandni Chowk. Yash disapproves of the relationship due to class differences and wants Rahul to marry Naina Kapoor, a family friend who quietly has feelings for him. Naina understands Rahul's love for Anjali and steps aside. Rahul considers ending the relationship but marries Anjali after her father’s sudden death. In response, Yash disowns Rahul, prompting him to leave for London with Anjali and her younger sister, Pooja. Nandini is heartbroken and sends the family’s nanny, Sayeeda, to accompany them. Soon after, Rohan is sent to boarding school.

Ten years later, Rohan returns home after completing his education. He learns of Rahul’s estrangement from a conversation between his grandmothers and requests permission to pursue an MBA in London, using it as a pretext to find Rahul. Upon arrival, he reconnects with Pooja, now a popular university student and fashion diva. Together, they devise a plan to bring Rahul and Anjali back to India.

To conceal his identity, Pooja introduces Rohan to Rahul as "Yash," her friend's cousin visiting from India looking for an Indian family where he could reside as a tenant. Although hesitant, Rahul allows him to stay after feeling a connection with him. Rohan bonds with his nephew Krish and develops a romantic connection with Pooja. Despite several close calls, Rahul remains unaware of Rohan’s true identity.

Eventually, Rohan reveals the truth and urges Rahul to return home. Rahul refuses, believing he has been permanently rejected by Yash. Hoping to change his mind, Pooja encourages Rohan to invite their parents to London. Nandini and Yash arrive, and while Nandini reunites emotionally with Rahul, he avoids his father. Yash learns of Rohan’s deception and becomes angry. The family returns to India following the death of Yash’s mother.

At the pyre, as Yash prepares to light it with Rohan, Nandini’s mother urges Yash to wait for Rahul, assuring him he will be there and that it was his mother’s last wish to have all three of them light the pyre together. Yash says he will not wait, and at that moment Rahul arrives. After the funeral, Nandini approaches Yash, informing him that Rahul and Anjali are preparing to return to London that day, without visiting home. She says they may stay at his request, but Yash gives her a sharp look to quiet her. Nandini reflects on her belief in the infallibility of husbands, and her mother’s teaching that a husband is akin to god. She then recounts positively his decision to bring Rahul into the family, and despairs at his decisions to remove him. She concludes that he is not infallible and is no god, just a husband. Yash tries to interject, but she shuts him down, using the same phrase he does when he ends conversations with his family. Rohan overhears them, and brings Rahul to pray. Rohan and Pooja urge Rahul to visit home just once for Nandini and Anjali’s sakes, and Rahul agrees.

At the Raichand’s, Rahul and Anjali ceremoniously enter. Nandini welcomes them and the three enter the chamber where his father is. Yash has his back to them, facing the portrait of Rahul and Rohan. Rahul attempts to leave, but is stopped from doing so by Nandini and Anjali. When Yash turns, hearing Nandini’s sobs, the family see that he has been crying. Rahul approaches him and they reconcile. Yash asks why Rahul took his words so harshly and never returned. Rahul reveals that he believed Yash did not love him. Yash says he loves him a great deal, but could never get himself to say it out loud. Yash asks Rahul to forgive him and the two embrace tightly. Rohan appears and Yash says he is an example of the younger family members showing the elders the right path. Holding on to both sons, he pleads with them to forgive him for keeping them apart, and they both embrace him.

The film ends with a belated celebration of Rahul's and Anjali's wedding and a celebratory wedding for Rohan and Pooja.

== Cast ==
- Amitabh Bachchan as Yashvardhan "Yash" Raichand: a Delhi based business tycoon; Lajwanti's son; Nandini's husband; Rahul's adoptive father; Rohan's biological father; Krish's grandfather
- Jaya Bachchan as Nandini Raichand: Harbans's daughter; Yash's wife; Rahul's adoptive mother; Rohan's biological mother; Krish's grandmother
- Shah Rukh Khan as Rahul Raichand: Yash and Nandini's adopted son; Rohan's adoptive brother; Anjali's husband; Krish's father
  - Aryan Khan as young Rahul
- Kajol as Anjali Sharma Raichand: Om's daughter; Pooja's sister; Rahul's wife; Krish's mother
- Hrithik Roshan as Rohan "Laddu" Raichand: Yash and Nandini's biological son; Rahul's adoptive brother; Pooja's boyfriend (later husband)
  - Kavish Majumdar as young Rohan
- Kareena Kapoor as Pooja "Poo" Sharma Raichand: Om's daughter; Anjali's sister; Rohan's girlfriend (later wife)
  - Malvika Raaj as young Pooja
- Rani Mukerji as Naina Kapoor: Rahul's childhood friend (extended guest appearance)
- Farida Jalal as Sayeeda Begum: Rahul and Rohan's nanny; Rukshar's mother
- Himani Shivpuri as Mrs. Rawat: Haldiram's wife
- Alok Nath as Om Sharma: Anjali and Pooja's father
- Johnny Lever as Haldiram Rawat: a sweetshop owner in Chandini Chowk
- Jugal Hansraj as Rohan's friend (cameo appearance)
- Achala Sachdev as Lajwanti "Lajjo" Raichand: Yash's mother; Rahul and Rohan's paternal grandmother
- Sushma Seth as Harbans Kaur: Nandini's mother; Rahul and Rohan's maternal grandmother
- Shashikala as Ashfaque's grandmother
- Tamzin Griffin as an anchor at Krish's school function
- Ramona Sunavala as Sonya
- Jeroo Writer as Tanya
- Vikas Sethi as Robbie
- Jibraan Khan as Krish Raichand: Rahul and Anjali's son
- Simone Singh as Rukshar Begum: Sayeeda's daughter; Ashfaque's wife
- Jessey Lever as Haldiram's son
- Amar Talwar as Mr. Kapoor: Naina's father; Yash's friend (uncredited)
- Parzaan Dastur as Ashfaque's nephew (uncredited)
- Punit Malhotra as a cricketer (uncredited)

== Production ==
=== Development ===
"At a certain age, boys are very demonstrative about their love towards their fathers. They hug and kiss them. But after that, they withdraw, become less demonstrative. My film is about relationships, about sons going up to their fathers and saying they love them."

— Karan Johar on Kabhi Khushi Kabhie Gham, from his interview to Rediff.com in 2001

A month before the release of Kuch Kuch Hota Hai (1998), while working in the background for the music in Dilwale Dulhania Le Jayenge, Johar threw in ideas alongside Aditya Chopra for a film based off two daughters-in-law. They eventually scrapped the idea and turned it into the two brothers of the film, Rohan and Rahul Raichand.

The title of the film was stylized with an additional "e" in the second "Kabhi" due to numerological reasons.

Johar described the film as being more mature than Kuch Kuch Hota Hai as the prior was "frothy and bubble-gummish".

Before shooting began, Johar collaborated with costume designers Manish Malhotra, Shabina Khan, and Rocky S to create distinct designs and fashion for each character. The team sourced clothing and accessories from multiple cities including London, Milan, New Delhi, and the United States. Other key crew members included choreographer Farah Khan, production designer Sharmishta Roy, and cinematographer Kiran Deohans.

=== Filming ===
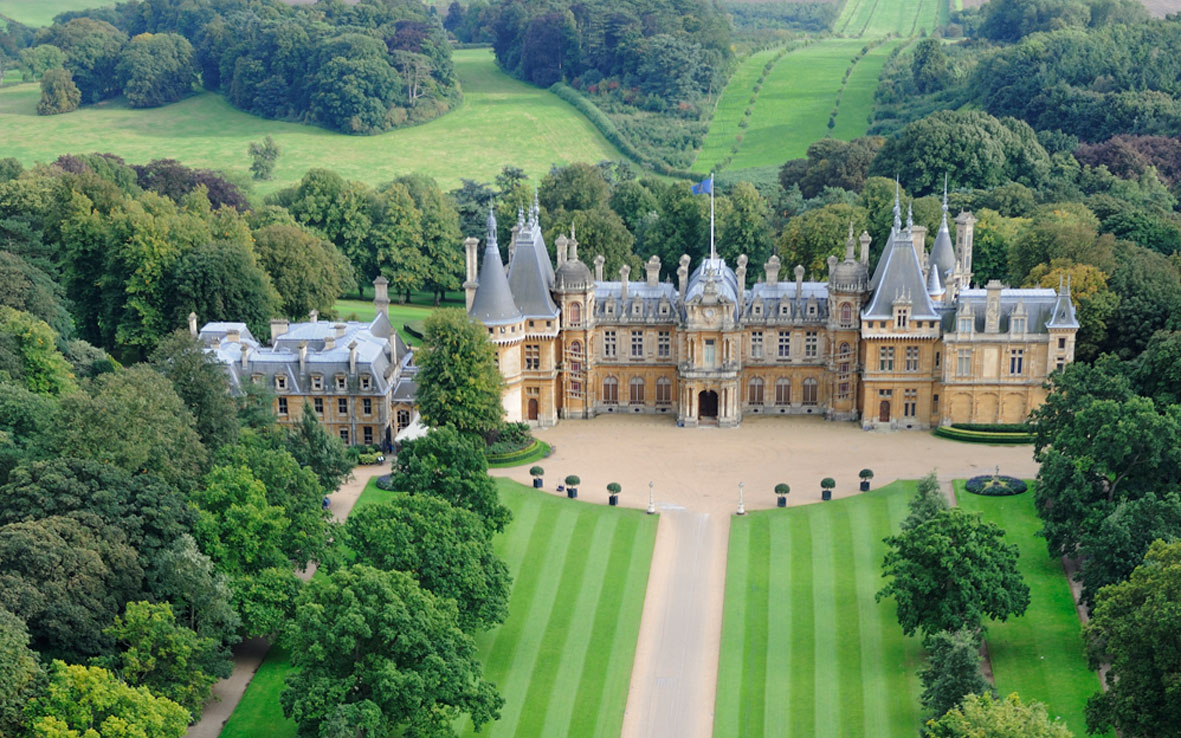
Waddesdon Manor (pictured) was featured as the mansion of the Raichand family in the film.

The song sequence "Bole Chudiyan", which featured Hrithik Roshan, Kareena Kapoor, Shah Rukh Khan, and Kajol was the first to be shot with the help of Farah Khan.

To recreate the Chandni Chowk setting for the film’s first half, production designer Sharmishta Roy led the construction of detailed sets at Film City, Mumbai.

The second half of the film was set and shot in the United Kingdom. Filming took place at several notable sites including the Millennium Stadium in Cardiff, Bluewater Shopping Centre in Kent, Blenheim Palace, St Paul's Cathedral, and the River Thames. Exterior shots of the Raichand estate were filmed at Waddesdon Manor. Large crowds had crowded Bluewater where a scene featuring Jaya Bachchan and Shah Rukh Khan was being shot. The situation led to authorities requesting filming to be done within two hours.

The song "Suraj Hua Maddham", featuring Khan and Kajol, was filmed at the Pyramids of Giza in Cairo, Egypt. Due to lighting limitations, filming was restricted to early morning hours and extended over several days.

== Themes ==
In the Encyclopedia of Religion and Film, Eric Mazur notes that the opening Diwali sequence, in which the Raichand family worships Hindu deities, allows the audience into the shared experience of darshan (prayer). Mazur also notes the use of dreamlike, non-narrative sequences such as the song "Suraj Hua Maddham", which he argues enables the characters to express physical intimacy and emotional longing in ways constrained by the film’s narrative world. He asserts that these moments rely more on non-verbal cues, including close-ups of glances and eyes, than on dialogue.

Sangita Gopal asserts that the film is situated within the tradition of Hindi melodrama, referencing scenes such as the confrontation between Yash and Rahul Raichand, which uses a dramatic background score and 360-degree panning shots. She argues the film's style is reminiscent of classical melodrama, but also shifts emphasis from social structure to interpersonal dynamics.

The film’s portrayal of diasporic life has also drawn sustained critical attention. Writing in Movie Blockbusters, Andrew Willis suggests that the narrative was deliberately crafted to appeal to the Indian diaspora, particularly in the United Kingdom, North America, and Canada. He interprets the second half of the film, set in London, as a nostalgic reflection on cultural displacement, with characters navigating emotional disconnection amid material prosperity. Anjali, in particular, is portrayed as deeply rooted in Indian traditions—wearing saris, performing domestic rituals, and expressing concern about the Westernization of her son and younger sister.

Building on this perspective, scholars such as Lars Eckstein argue that the film advances a culturally conservative view of India, contrasting it with the perceived emptiness of Western consumer culture. References to global brands such as Starbucks and Burger King are cited to emphasize the commodification of lifestyle abroad. Eckstein characterizes the Raichands' life in the United Kingdom as an "involuntary exile", with their eventual return to India depicted as a form of emotional and cultural reconciliation.

Corey Creekmur explores the film’s tagline—"It’s all about loving your parents"—in relation to its internal family dynamics. While the narrative celebrates filial devotion, Creekmur contends that it simultaneously challenges patriarchal rigidity. He identifies Rohan as a pivotal character who seamlessly bridges traditional Indian values and Western cosmopolitanism. According to Creekmur, the film ultimately advocates for emotional openness between fathers and children, while portraying mothers, grandmothers, and aunts as consistently nurturing and supportive, even when constrained by patriarchal expectations.

== Soundtrack ==
The soundtrack for Kabhi Khushi Kabhie Gham was composed by Jatin–Lalit, Sandesh Shandilya, and Aadesh Shrivastava, with lyrics by Sameer. The album comprises 11 tracks and was released on 26 October 2001 by Sony Music. The background score for the film was composed by Babloo Chakravarty.

== Release ==
=== Theatrical ===
Kabhi Khushi Kabhie Gham was initially planned for release during the Diwali season of 2001 but was ultimately released theatrically on 14 December 2001. Several cinemas raised their ticket prices when the film was launched.

The film’s use of "Jana Gana Mana", India's national anthem, drew criticism from some audience members. They argued that its placement within the narrative was inappropriate and disrespectful to national pride. A written petition was filed against Dharma Productions in the Allahabad High Court.The court however dismissed the complaint.

=== Marketing ===
Prior to its theatrical release, the film's music, overseas distribution, and telecast rights were collectively sold for approximately ₹350 million (US$7.42 million). This included ₹250 million for the overseas rights, which were acquired by Sony.

During the film’s production, screenwriter and journalist Niranjan Iyengar authored The Making of Kabhi Khushi Kabhie Gham, a companion book based on 18 months of on-set observations and interviews with the film’s cast and crew. The book was published shortly before the film’s release and documented various aspects of the production process.

=== Home media ===
Kabhi Khushi Kabhie Gham was released on VHS and DVD formats beginning in 2002, with a two-disc DVD edition including a 45-minute behind-the-scenes documentary, deleted scenes, trailers, and promotional content. The film was later issued on Blu-ray in 2010.

As of 2025, the film is available for streaming on major digital platforms, including Netflix and Amazon Prime Video.

== Reception ==
=== Critical reception ===
==== India ====
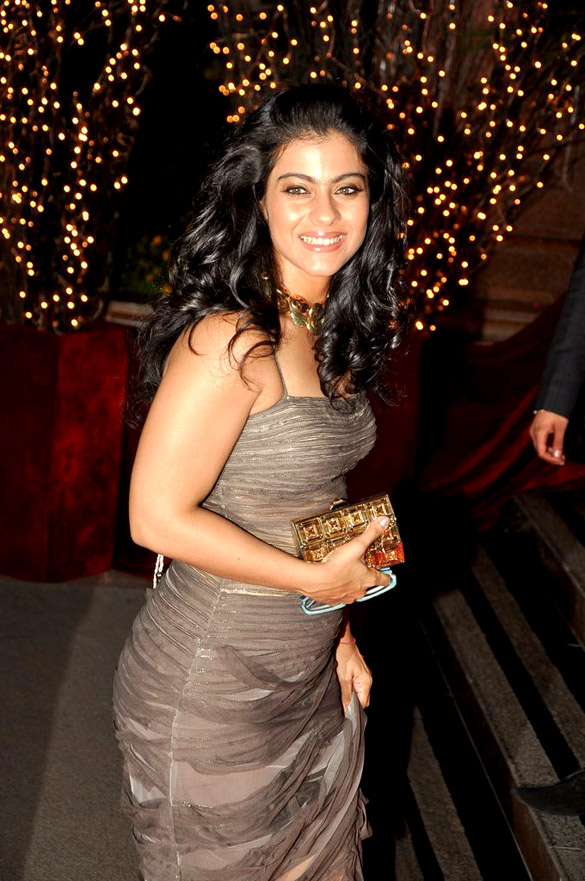
Kajol was praised for her performance. A review carried by The Hindu noted that she "steals the thunder from under very high noses."

Upon its release, Kabhi Khushi Kabhie Gham received a range of responses from Indian film critics, with praise directed at its production values and performances, and criticism aimed at its length and screenplay.

Khalid Mohamed of The Times of India gave the film a five-star rating, calling it "the complete commercial banquet delivered with fabulous finesse." Taran Adarsh of Bollywood Hungama rated it 4.5 out of 5 stars and lauded the emotional sequences, production design, choreography, and cinematography, crediting Karan Johar as the driving creative force. Rakesh Budhu of Planet Bollywood gave the film 8 out of 10, acknowledging its narrative flaws but calling it “one heck of an entertainer.”

Fuad Omar, writing in Bollywood: An Insider’s Guide, described the film as "a masterpiece from the first frame to the last," calling it "the most enthralling, entertaining, emotional and complete vision and definition of Hindi cinema I have ever seen."

Other reviewers offered more mixed or negative assessments. Anjum N. of Rediff.com criticized the film as a "bad remix of Mohabbatein (2000) and Kuch Kuch Hota Hai,” though he praised the performances of Amitabh and Jaya Bachchan, and Hrithik Roshan. Ziya Us Salam of The Hindu praised Kajol’s performance and Johar’s ability to engage viewers, stating that the film offered “some joy, some disappointment.” Namrata Joshi of Outlook found the emotions exaggerated, calling the film “monochromatic despite the profusion of colours.”

==== Overseas ====
Internationally, the film was generally well received. On the review aggregator website Rotten Tomatoes, 100% of 12 critics' reviews are positive, with an average rating of 7.8/10.

Shamaila Khan of the BBC gave it 9 out of 10 stars, praising the performances of Shah Rukh Khan, Kajol, and Kareena Kapoor, and describing the film as “well made, with some magical moments (hilarious and weepy) and possibly the world's best-looking family.” Derek Elley of Variety called it “highly enjoyable” and praised its set pieces and visual style, though he noted the narrative lost momentum in the final half-hour.

=== Box office ===
Kabhi Khushi Kabhie Gham opened to record-breaking collections in India. It earned approximately ₹70 million net during its opening weekend, and ₹140 million in its first week. These figures were about 70% higher than the previous box-office record at the time. The film continued its strong performance into subsequent weeks, grossing ₹105 million in its second week and ₹80 million in its third. It eventually netted ₹550 million domestically, becoming the second highest-grossing Indian film of 2001 in India, and earned “Blockbuster” status.

Internationally, the film was released in approximately 125 prints and earned a total of US$8.9 million at the overseas box office. It performed exceptionally well in the United Kingdom, grossing US$689,000 in its opening weekend and ranking third at the British box office. It went on to earn over US$3.2 million in the UK. In North America, it grossed US$1.1 million in its opening weekend across 73 screens, the highest opening ever for a Bollywood film at that time. Due to delayed box-office reporting, its actual debut position on the American charts was affected, though Box Office Mojo recorded it at number 32 for the week ending 4 January 2002. Its final gross in the United States was US$2.9 million.

In 2003, Kabhi Khushi Kabhie Gham became the first Indian film to receive a theatrical release in Germany. The film's global gross totaled approximately ₹1.36 billion (US$29 million), making it the highest-grossing Indian film overseas at the time. Its record stood until surpassed by Johar’s subsequent directorial, Kabhi Alvida Naa Kehna (2006). When adjusted for inflation, the film remains one of the highest-grossing Indian films worldwide.

== Accolades ==
Kabhi Khushi Kabhie Gham received significant recognition at Indian and international award ceremonies. At the 47th Filmfare Awards, it led the nominations with 16 nods and won five awards. In a subsequent interview, director Karan Johar expressed satisfaction with the outcome, stating that although the film did not win the top prizes, he considered Lagaan “a classic” and deserving of its wins.

The film was also successful at the International Indian Film Academy Awards (IIFA), where it received seven awards. It earned additional honors at the Zee Cine Awards and Screen Awards. Internationally, it won five awards at the 13th Valenciennes International Film Festival in France, including three for Best Film and Best Actress for Kajol.

Award	Date of the ceremony	Category	Recipients	Result	Ref.
Zee Cine Awards	11 January 2002	Best Film	Kabhi Khushi Kabhie Gham	Nominated	
Zee Cine Awards	11 January 2002	Best Director	Karan Johar	Nominated	
Zee Cine Awards	11 January 2002	Best Actor – Male	Shah Rukh Khan	Nominated	
Zee Cine Awards	11 January 2002	Best Actor – Female	Kajol	Nominated	
Zee Cine Awards	11 January 2002	Outstanding Performance – Female	Kajol	Won	
Zee Cine Awards	11 January 2002	Best Actor in a Supporting Role – Male	Amitabh Bachchan	Nominated	
Zee Cine Awards	11 January 2002	Best Actor in a Supporting Role – Male	Hrithik Roshan	Nominated	
Zee Cine Awards	11 January 2002	Best Music Director	Jatin–Lalit, Sandesh Shandilya, Aadesh Shrivastava	Nominated	
Zee Cine Awards	11 January 2002	Best Lyricist	Anil Pandey for "Suraj Hua Maddham"	Nominated	
Zee Cine Awards	11 January 2002	Best Playback Singer – Male	Sonu Nigam for "Suraj Hua Maddham"	Won	
Zee Cine Awards	11 January 2002	Best Playback Singer – Female	Alka Yagnik for "Suraj Hua Maddham"	Nominated	
Zee Cine Awards	11 January 2002	Best Playback Singer – Female	Lata Mangeshkar for "Kabhi Khushi Kabhie Gham"	Nominated	
Screen Awards	13 January 2002	Best Film	Kabhi Khushi Kabhie Gham	Nominated	
Screen Awards	13 January 2002	Best Actor	Shah Rukh Khan	Nominated	
Screen Awards	13 January 2002	Best Actress	Kajol	Won	
Screen Awards	13 January 2002	Best Supporting Actor	Amitabh Bachchan	Nominated	
Screen Awards	13 January 2002	Best Supporting Actor	Hrithik Roshan	Nominated	
Screen Awards	13 January 2002	Best Supporting Actress	Kareena Kapoor	Nominated	
Screen Awards	13 January 2002	Jodi No. 1	Shah Rukh Khan & Kajol	Won	
Screen Awards	13 January 2002	Jodi No. 1	Hrithik Roshan & Kareena Kapoor	Nominated	
Screen Awards	13 January 2002	Best Art Direction	Sharmishta Roy	Nominated	
Screen Awards	13 January 2002	Best Sound Recording	Anuj Mathur	Nominated	
Screen Awards	13 January 2002	Best Special Effects	Pankaj Khandpur	Nominated	
Filmfare Awards	16 February 2002	Best Film	Kabhi Khushi Kabhie Gham	Nominated	
Filmfare Awards	16 February 2002	Best Director	Karan Johar	Nominated	
Filmfare Awards	16 February 2002	Best Actor	Shah Rukh Khan	Nominated	
Filmfare Awards	16 February 2002	Best Actress	Kajol	Won	
Filmfare Awards	16 February 2002	Best Supporting Actor	Amitabh Bachchan	Nominated	
Filmfare Awards	16 February 2002	Best Supporting Actor	Hrithik Roshan	Nominated	
Filmfare Awards	16 February 2002	Best Supporting Actress	Jaya Bachchan	Won	
Filmfare Awards	16 February 2002	Best Supporting Actress	Kareena Kapoor	Nominated	
Filmfare Awards	16 February 2002	Best Music Director	Jatin–Lalit	Nominated	
Filmfare Awards	16 February 2002	Best Lyricist	Anil Pandey for "Suraj Hua Maddham"	Nominated	
Filmfare Awards	16 February 2002	Best Lyricist	Sameer for "Kabhi Khushi Kabhie Gham"	Nominated	
Filmfare Awards	16 February 2002	Best Male Playback Singer	Sonu Nigam for "Suraj Hua Maddham"	Nominated	
Filmfare Awards	16 February 2002	Best Female Playback Singer	Alka Yagnik for "Suraj Hua Maddham"	Nominated	
Filmfare Awards	16 February 2002	Best Scene of the Year	Family reunion at the Bluewater Shopping Centre	Won	
Filmfare Awards	16 February 2002	Best Dialogue	Karan Johar	Won	
Filmfare Awards	16 February 2002	Best Art Direction	Sharmishta Roy	Won	
Valenciennes International Film Festival	20–24 March 2002	Best Film (Special Jury Award)	Karan Johar	Won	
Valenciennes International Film Festival	20–24 March 2002	Best Film (Audience Jury Award)	Karan Johar	Won	
Valenciennes International Film Festival	20–24 March 2002	Best Film (Student Jury Award)	Karan Johar	Won	
Valenciennes International Film Festival	20–24 March 2002	Best Actress	Kajol	Won	
Valenciennes International Film Festival	20–24 March 2002	Bleu Nord Award	Jatin–Lalit, Sandesh Shandilya, Aadesh Shrivastava	Won	
Sansui Viewers' Choice Movie Awards	27 March 2002	Best Actress	Kajol	Won	
Sansui Viewers' Choice Movie Awards	27 March 2002	Best Supporting Actress	Jaya Bachchan	Won	
Sansui Viewers' Choice Movie Awards	27 March 2002	Best Supporting Actress	Kareena Kapoor	Nominated	
Bollywood Movie Awards	6 April 2002	Best Film	Kabhi Khushi Kabhie Gham	Won	
Bollywood Movie Awards	6 April 2002	Best Actor	Shah Rukh Khan	Nominated	
Bollywood Movie Awards	6 April 2002	Best Actor (Critics)	Shah Rukh Khan	Nominated	
Bollywood Movie Awards	6 April 2002	Best Actress	Kajol	Won	
Bollywood Movie Awards	6 April 2002	Best Supporting Actor	Hrithik Roshan	Won	
Bollywood Movie Awards	6 April 2002	Best Sensational Role – Female	Kareena Kapoor	Nominated	

== Legacy ==
Since its release, Kabhi Khushi Kabhie Gham has come to be regarded as a landmark film in Hindi cinema, noted for its combination of emotional melodrama, lavish production values, and cross-generational storytelling. Retrospective analyses have highlighted its influence on diaspora narratives, family-oriented themes, and the globalization of Bollywood cinema.

In a 2024 feature, ThePrint described the film as "one of Bollywood’s most iconic family dramas," citing its ensemble cast, memorable dialogues, and enduring music. The Guardian characterized it as a "feel-good movie" that "instantly uplifts my mood," noting its continued popularity more than two decades after release.

Critics and scholars have observed that the film played a key role in shaping mainstream Hindi cinema’s engagement with themes of class, familial expectation, and identity in post-liberalization India. Its stylized portrayal of London and Delhi as symbolic cultural spaces has been widely discussed in academic literature, particularly in relation to diasporic longing, aspirational consumption, and patriarchal conflict.

Kabhi Khushi Kabhie Gham has also had a lasting impact on popular culture. The character of Poo, portrayed by Kareena Kapoor, emerged as a generational pop culture icon, celebrated across social media platforms for her confidence, style, and comedic timing. In 2021, Elle India referred to Poo as "Bollywood's original Gen Z icon," while Vogue India likened her to Western figures such as Elle Woods and Cher Horowitz, citing her influence on early-2000s fashion in Indian cinema.

The film’s long-term popularity has been reinforced through frequent television broadcasts, international syndication, and sustained viewership on streaming platforms. In 2020, The Guardian included the film in its curated list of underappreciated global titles available on Netflix, calling it a "Bollywood extravaganza" that deserved wider international recognition.

In a 2021 interview, director Karan Johar reflected on the film’s continued resonance, expressing surprise at the affection it still receives from audiences worldwide. He noted that while the film was rooted in traditional values, its emotional universality contributed to its lasting relevance.

== Bibliography ==
- Eckstein, Lars (2008), Multi-Ethnic Britain 2000+: New Perspectives in Literature, Film and the Arts, Rodopi, ISBN 978-9042024977.
- Hirji, Faiza (2010), Dreaming in Canadian: South Asian Youth, Bollywood, and Belonging, UBC Press, ISBN 978-0774817981.
- Mazumdar, Ranjani (2007), Bombay Cinema: An Archive of the City, University of Minnesota Press, ISBN 978-0816649426.
- Mazur, Eric (2011), Encyclopedia of Religion and Film, ABC-CLIO, ISBN 978-0313330728.
- Bhattacharya Mehta, Rini; Pandharipande, Rajeshwari (2010), Bollywood and Globalization: Indian Popular Cinema, Nation, and Diaspora: Anthem South Asian Studies, Anthem Press, ISBN 978-1843318330.
- Omar, Fuad (2006), Bollywood: An Insider's Guide, Lulu.com, ISBN 1847280099.
- Oonk, Gijsbert (2007), Global Indian Diasporas: Exploring Trajectories of Migration and Theory, Amsterdam University Press, ISBN 978-9053560358.
- Punathambekar, Aswin (2005). "Bollywood in the Indian-American Diaspora: Mediating a transitive logic of cultural citizenship" (PDF). International Journal of Cultural Studies. 8 (2). SAGE Publications: 151–173. doi:10.1177/1367877905052415. S2CID 145205351. Archived from the original (PDF) on 4 March 2016.
- Stringer, Julian (2003), Movie Blockbusters, Routledge, ISBN 0415256089.
