= Karan Johar =

Indian filmmaker and host (born 1972)

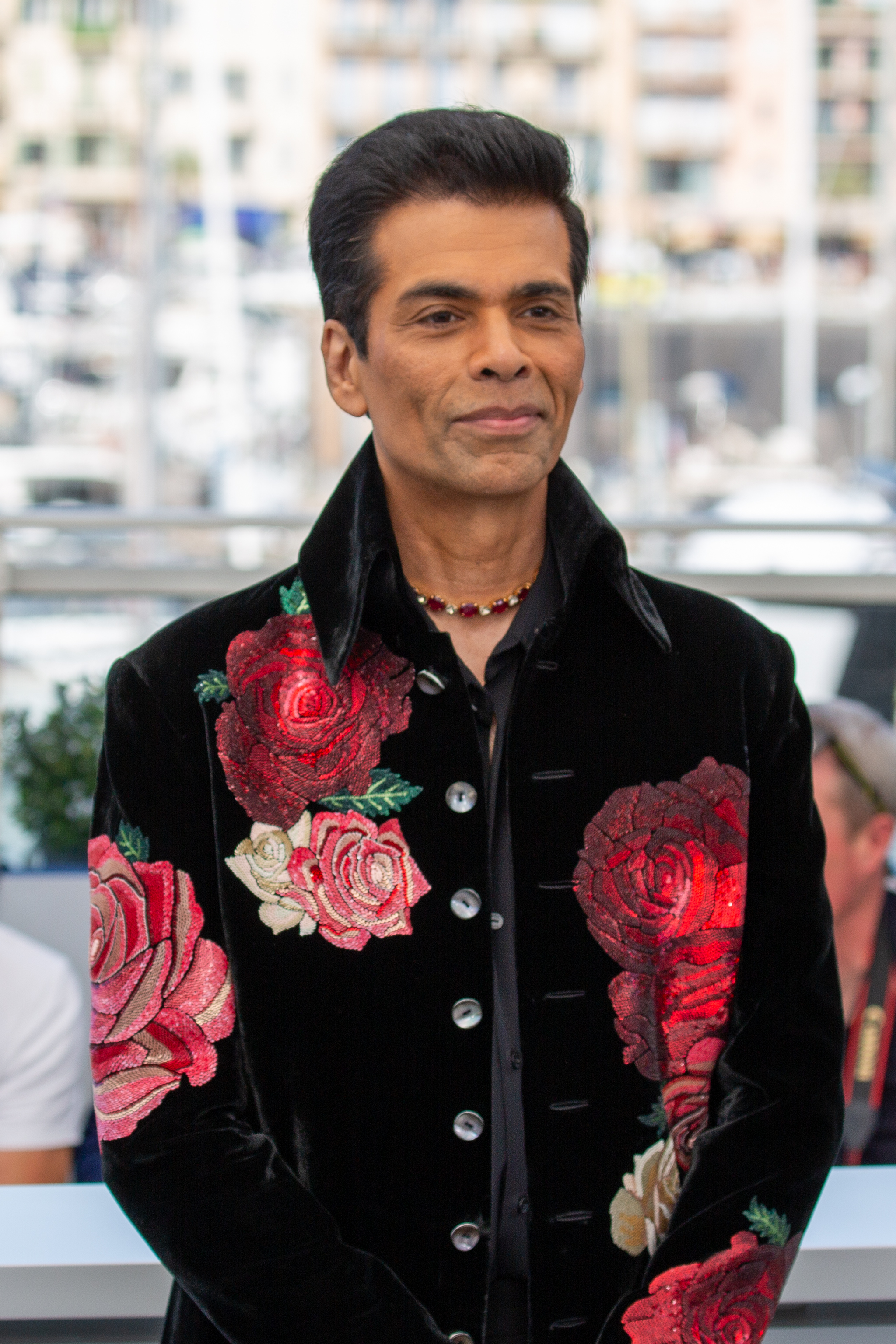
- Johar at the 2025 Cannes Film Festival
- Born: Rahul Kumar Johar; 25 May 1972 (age 54); Mumbai, Maharashtra, India
- Education: H.R. College of Commerce
- Occupations: Film director; producer; television presenter
- Years active: 1989–present
- Organization: Dharma Productions
- Children: 2
- Father: Yash Johar
- Family: Johar family; Chopra family
- Awards: Full list
- Honours: Padma Shri (2020)

Signature
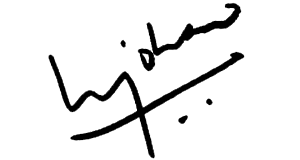

Karan Kumar Johar (born Rahul Kumar Johar; 25 May 1972), often informally referred to as KJo, is an Indian film producer, filmmaker and television personality who primarily works in Hindi cinema. He has launched the careers of several successful actors and filmmakers under his company Dharma Productions. The recipient of several accolades, including four National Film Awards and eight Filmfare Awards, he has been honoured with the Padma Shri by the Government of India in 2020.

The son of producer Yash Johar, he made his directorial debut with the romantic comedy-drama Kuch Kuch Hota Hai (1998), which earned him the National Film Award for Best Popular Film Providing Wholesome Entertainment (as director), the Filmfare Award for Best Director and the Filmfare Award for Best Screenplay. His next films, the family drama Kabhi Khushi Kabhie Gham (2001) and the musical romantic drama Kabhi Alvida Naa Kehna (2006), were both major commercial successes in both domestic and overseas markets. His social drama My Name Is Khan (2010) earned him his second Filmfare Award for Best Director. Johar produced the spy thriller Raazi (2018) and the biopic Shershaah (2021), both of which won him the Filmfare Award for Best Film, with the latter also earning him the National Film Award – Special Jury Mention as producer. Later, as producer of the fantasy film Brahmāstra: Part One – Shiva (2022), he won the inaugural National Film Award for Best Film in AVGC. Johar returned to directing with the romantic comedy-drama Rocky Aur Rani Kii Prem Kahaani (2023), which earned him another National Film Award for Best Popular Film Providing Wholesome Entertainment. He then went on to produce the drama Homebound (2025), which was chosen as the Indian entry for the Best International Feature Film at the 98th Academy Awards, and was subsequently shortlisted in the category. These, along with other films he has directed or produced under his company, have established him as one of the leading filmmakers in Hindi cinema.

Johar has also ventured into other avenues of the entertainment industry. He hosts a television talk show, Koffee with Karan from 2004 to its final season currently ongoing, a dating show What the Love! and a radio show Calling Karan, and appeared as a judge on competition reality shows Jhalak Dikhhla Jaa, Dil Hai Hindustani and India's Got Talent.

== Early and personal life ==
Karan Johar was born on 25 May 1972 in Bombay, India, to a Punjabi father, film producer Yash Johar, founder of Dharma Productions, and a Sindhi mother, Hiroo Johar. He grew up in a "cosmopolitan house" where the family communicated in English, and his father, an Arya Samaji, would recite Hindu, Sikh, and Christian prayers. He is the nephew of filmmaker Yash Chopra and the first cousin of film producer Aditya Chopra.

Johar studied at Green Lawns High School and later H.R. College of Commerce and Economics, both in Mumbai. Johar attempted admission to The Doon School but was declined due to scoring zero in mathematics.

He began his career as a child actor, playing Shrikant in the 1989 Doordarshan serial Indradhanush, and was influenced by Raj Kapoor, Yash Chopra, and Sooraj Barjatya. He briefly followed numerology for film titles but stopped after watching Lage Raho Munna Bhai.

Johar has publicly discussed his sexual orientation, stating, "Everybody knows what my sexual orientation is," and in February 2017, he became a father to twins, son Yash and daughter Roohi, via surrogacy. He named his son after his father, Yash Johar, and his daughter after his mother, Hiroo Johar.

In 2020, following the death of Sushant Singh Rajput, Johar faced criticism and allegations of promoting nepotism in Bollywood, particularly regarding casting of star children. Johar defended his casting choices, highlighting the number of debut directors and outsider talents introduced by his production house.

== Film career ==
=== Director ===
==== Initial work and breakthrough 1995–2001 ====
Johar entered the film industry as an assistant director and actor on his cousin, Aditya Chopra's Dilwale Dulhania Le Jayenge (1995), which is one of the most successful films to date.

He made his own directorial debut with the romantic comedy-drama Kuch Kuch Hota Hai (1998). The first half of the film centers on a college love triangle between an insensitive boy (Shah Rukh Khan), his tomboyish best friend (Kajol), and the prettiest girl at the college (Rani Mukerji), while the second half centers on the now-widowed boy's attempt to reconnect with his best friend who is now engaged to marry a businessman (Salman Khan). The film emerged as a major blockbuster at the box-office and received positive reviews from critics. Writing for PlanetBollywood.com, critic Anish Khanna commented that "Johar makes an impressive directorial debut, has a good script sense, and knows how to make a film with S-T-Y-L-E." It won the National Film Award for Best Popular Film Providing Wholesome Entertainment. It swept most of the major awards at the 44th Filmfare Awards, including Best Film, Best Director, and all four acting awards.

Johar achieved his breakthrough with the ensemble family drama Kabhi Khushi Kabhie Gham (2001). The film starred Amitabh Bachchan as an egotistical rich industrialist, Jaya Bachchan as his compassionate wife, and Shah Rukh Khan and Hrithik Roshan as their two sons. It also featured Kajol and Kareena Kapoor as sisters from a lower-class family who become the love interests of Khan and Roshan respectively. The film emerged as Johar's second consecutive major blockbuster at the box-office and received positive reviews from critics. Critic Taran Adarsh commented that Johar "confirms the fact that he is the brightest in film firmament. The premise [of the film] is simple, but it is the storytelling that deserves the highest marks." Kabhi Khushi Kabhie Gham earned him his second nomination for the Filmfare Award for Best Director.

==== 2006–10 ====
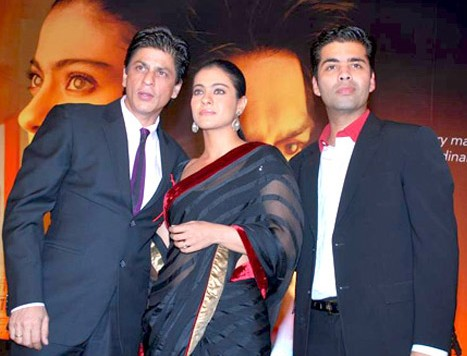
Johar with Shah Rukh Khan and Kajol at a promotional event for My Name Is Khan in 2010

Johar's third directorial venture was the ensemble musical romantic drama Kabhi Alvida Naa Kehna (2006), which dealt with the controversial subject of marital infidelity, emotional dissatisfaction, and dysfunctional relationships set against the backdrop of non-resident Indians (NRIs) living in New York City. The film's plot follows a washed-up athlete (Shah Rukh Khan), whose frustration with his wife (Preity Zinta) results in an extramarital affair with a family friend (Rani Mukerji), a schoolteacher who is also unhappy with her marriage to her childhood friend (Abhishek Bachchan). The film emerged as Johar's third consecutive major blockbuster at the box-office and emerged as the highest-grossing Indian film of all time in overseas markets at the time. It received highly positive reviews from critics who praised Johar's departure from the directorial style of his first two films. Rajeev Masand wrote, "Few writers have such solid control over their screenplay as Johar does. Few understand the intricacies of narrative as well as he does. Johar goes from highs to lows, from plateaus to peaks with the ease of a pro. He knows exactly how to turn a seemingly ordinary scene into something special with just that one line of dialogue, or that hint of background music." The script of the film which was co-written by Johar received recognition by a number of critics and was invited to be included in the library of the Academy of Motion Picture Arts and Sciences. Kabhi Alvida Naa Kehna earned him his third nomination for the Filmfare Award for Best Director.

Johar's next directorial venture was the social drama My Name Is Khan (2010), his first film not written by him. The plot follows a Muslim man with Asperger's syndrome and his Hindu wife, played by Shah Rukh Khan and Kajol, who live in San Francisco and face racial prejudice after 11 September attacks. The film emerged as Johar's fourth consecutive major blockbuster in both domestic and overseas markets, and received rave reviews from critics who praised Johar's unconventional directorial style. Critic Subhash K. Jha wrote that the film "is a flawless work, as perfect in content, tone, and treatment as any film can get." My Name Is Khan won Johar his second Filmfare Award for Best Director.

==== 2012–18 ====
For his next feature film Student of the Year (2012), Johar chose not to cast established actors for his lead roles and instead recruited three debutante actors (Sidharth Malhotra, Alia Bhatt and Varun Dhawan). The plot revolved around the quest of a group of students who are all gunning for the title of "Student of the Year" at their college. The film emerged as a moderate commercial success and received mixed reviews from critics. Some called it "supremely entertaining and enjoyable," while others called it "a film which suffers from the lack-of-a-story syndrome."

Johar then teamed up with Zoya Akhtar, Anurag Kashyap, and Dibakar Banerjee for Bombay Talkies (2013), an anthology film released to celebrate the centenary year of Hindi cinema. Each of these directors made one short film to contribute to the large anthology. The plot of Johar's film followed a magazine editor (Rani Mukerji) who discovers that her husband (Randeep Hooda) is gay after an interaction with an intern at her office (Saqib Saleem). The film did not perform well at the box-office, but earned positive reviews from critics, with major praise for Johar's segment earning him a nomination for the Queer Palm award at the 2013 Cannes Film Festival.

Johar's next directorial venture was the musical romantic drama Ae Dil Hai Mushkil (2016). The film featured Ranbir Kapoor as a man dealing with an unrequited love for his best friend, played by Anushka Sharma. It also featured Aishwarya Rai Bachchan as an older woman who engages in a brief relationship with Kapoor's character, and Fawad Khan as the love interest of Sharma's character. The film emerged as his fifth major blockbuster at the box-office and received positive reviews from critics, who called it "Johar's most grown-up film yet." Ae Dil Hai Mushkil earned him his fifth nomination for the Filmfare Award for Best Director.

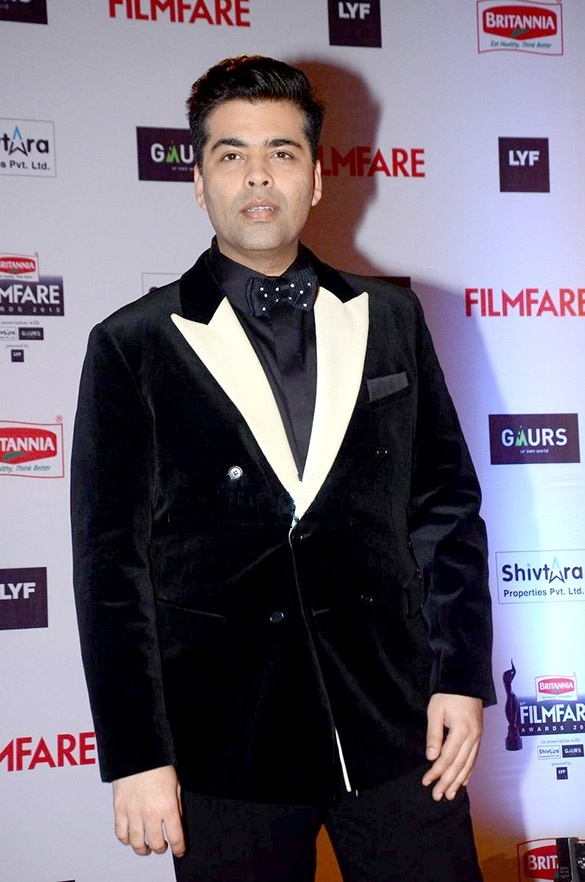
Johar in 2016

Johar teamed up again with Zoya Akhtar, Anurag Kashyap, and Dibakar Banerjee for Lust Stories (2018), an anthology film released on Netflix that served as a follow-up to Bombay Talkies. The film was praised for its exploration of female sexuality, a subject rarely dealt with in Indian films. Johar's segment revolved around a newly married schoolteacher (Kiara Advani) whose husband (Vicky Kaushal) fails to recognize her lack of sexual satisfaction.

==== 2018–present ====
In August 2018, Johar took to Twitter to announce his next film Takht, a period drama based in the Mughal era. It was supposed to feature an ensemble star cast of Ranveer Singh, Kareena Kapoor, Alia Bhatt, Vicky Kaushal, Bhumi Pednekar, Janhvi Kapoor, and Anil Kapoor. With a screenplay by Sumit Roy, dialogues by Hussain Haidry, and music composed by A. R. Rahman, it was supposed to be the second film directed by Johar that was not written by himself. In an interview with Firstpost, Johar stated that Takht would begin filming in September 2019. However, owing to the COVID-19 pandemic, the entire project was postponed, with Johar stating that he would pick it up again in the future.

In 2020, he reteamed with Banerjee, Akhtar and Kashyap for the horror anthology film Ghost Stories, the sequel to Lust Stories. Ghost Stories premiered on Netflix on 1 January 2020. His segment in the film told the story of a newly married woman (Mrunal Thakur) and her experience with her husband's (Avinash Tiwary) post-traumatic stress disorder. Unlike its predecessors, it received mixed-to-negative reviews from critics upon release.

In July 2021, it was announced that Johar would direct a romantic comedy family drama instead, titled Rocky Aur Rani Kii Prem Kahaani. The film starred Dharmendra, Jaya Bachchan, Shabana Azmi, Ranveer Singh, and Alia Bhatt in lead roles. It was released on 28 July 2023 and emerged as a critical and commercial success, ranking as the seventh highest-grossing Bollywood film of the year. The film earned Johar several awards including the National Film Award for Best Popular Film Providing Wholesome Entertainment.

=== Producer ===
Johar's directorial work (with the exception of anthology films Bombay Talkies (2013), Lust Stories (2018) and Ghost Stories (2020)) has been produced under the Dharma Productions banner, founded by his father Yash Johar and taken over by him after his father's death in 2004. In addition to his own directorial work, he has produced several films by other directors under the Dharma banner. Many of these films have become major critical and commercial successes including Kal Ho Naa Ho (2003), Dostana (2008), Wake Up Sid (2009), I Hate Luv Storys (2010), Agneepath (2012), a remake of the 1990 cult classic movie of the same name, Yeh Jawaani Hai Deewani (2013), 2 States (2014), Humpty Sharma Ki Dulhania (2014), Kapoor & Sons (2016), Dear Zindagi (2016), Badrinath Ki Dulhania (2017), Raazi (2018), Simmba (2018), Dhadak (2018), Kesari (2019), Good Newwz (2019), Sooryavanshi (2021), and Brahmāstra: Part One – Shiva (2022).

== Other work ==
Johar made his acting debut in the 1989 television series Indradhanush. In addition to working as an assistant director on Dilwale Dulhania Le Jayenge (1995), Johar was an actor in the film, playing the minor role of a friend of Shah Rukh Khan’s character. Since then, he has made cameo appearances playing himself in films like Om Shanti Om (2007), Fashion (2008), and Luck by Chance (2009).

He got his first full-fledged film role alongside Ranbir Kapoor and Anushka Sharma in Anurag Kashyap’s period drama Bombay Velvet (2015), in which he played the main antagonist. Although the film did not perform well at the box-office, Johar earned mixed-to-positive reviews for his performance. Critic Sarita A. Tanwar commented, "The only consolation in the film is Johar who brings a lot of dignity to the character of Khambatta... which is commendable since this is totally outside his comfort space."

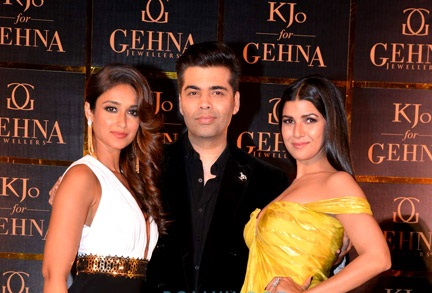
KJo with Ileana D'Cruz and Nimrat Kaur at "KJo For Gehna" line

Johar has worked as a costume designer for Shah Rukh Khan on many films like Dilwale Dulhania Le Jayenge (1995), Dil To Pagal Hai (1997), Duplicate (1998), Mohabbatein (2000), Main Hoon Na (2004), Veer-Zaara (2004), and Om Shanti Om (2007).

Johar is the host of Koffee with Karan, a talk show where he interviews actors, directors, producers, and other prominent members of the Hindi film industry. The series has run intermittently since 2004, with eight seasons as of January 2024. Since 2012, he has served as a judge on the reality shows Jhalak Dikhhla Jaa (with Madhuri Dixit and Remo D’Souza), India's Got Talent (with Malaika Arora Khan, Kirron Kher, and Farah Khan) and India's Next Superstars (with Rohit Shetty). In January 2022, he appeared as a judge on the Colors TV's show Hunarbaaz: Desh Ki Shaan along with Mithun Chakraborty and Parineeti Chopra.

Johar is also an investor in an AI-led adtech influencer marketing platform Konfluence. The company had raised a pre-series funding of $4 million as of 8 February 2022.

In 2024, Johar invested in the Fashion Entrepreneur Fund, a venture studio supporting fashion and lifestyle startups in India.

He hosted the inaugural season of the 2025 series of The Traitors India, broadcast on Prime Video. In January 2018, Johar attended the "Shalom Bollywood" event in Mumbai, which promoted greater collaboration between the Israeli and Indian film industries. The event followed his filming of scenes for the movie Drive in Tel Aviv in 2017.

== Filmography ==
=== Film ===
Year	Title	Director	Producer	Writer	Notes
1998	Kuch Kuch Hota Hai	Yes		Yes	
2001	Kabhi Khushi Kabhie Gham	Yes		Yes	
2003	Kal Ho Naa Ho		Yes	Yes	
2005	Kaal		Yes		
2006	Kabhi Alvida Naa Kehna	Yes	Yes	Yes	
2008	Dostana		Yes		
2009	Wake Up Sid		Yes		
2009	Kurbaan		Yes	Yes	
2010	My Name Is Khan	Yes	Yes		
2010	I Hate Luv Storys		Yes		
2010	We Are Family		Yes		
2012	Agneepath		Yes		
2012	Ek Main Aur Ekk Tu		Yes		
2012	Student of the Year	Yes	Yes	Yes	
2013	Bombay Talkies	Yes		Yes	Segment: "Ajeeb Dastaan Hai Yeh"
2013	Gippi		Yes		
2013	Yeh Jawaani Hai Deewani		Yes		
2013	Gori Tere Pyaar Mein		Yes		
2014	Hasee Toh Phasee		Yes		
2014	2 States		Yes		
2014	Humpty Sharma Ki Dulhania		Yes		
2014	Ungli		Yes		
2015	All India Bakchod Knockout		Yes		
2015	Brothers		Yes		
2015	Shaandaar		Yes		
2016	Kapoor & Sons		Yes		
2016	Baar Baar Dekho		Yes		
2016	Ae Dil Hai Mushkil	Yes	Yes	Yes	
2016	Dear Zindagi		Yes		
2017	Ok Jaanu		Yes		
2017	Badrinath Ki Dulhania		Yes		
2017	Ittefaq		Yes		
2018	Lust Stories	Yes		Yes	4th segment
2018	Raazi		Yes		
2018	Dhadak		Yes		
2018	Simmba		Yes		
2019	Kesari		Yes		
2019	Kalank		Yes		
2019	Student of the Year 2		Yes		
2019	Drive		Yes		
2019	Good Newwz		Yes		
2020	Ghost Stories	Yes		Yes	4th segment
2020	Guilty		Yes		
2020	Bhoot – Part One: The Haunted Ship		Yes		
2020	Gunjan Saxena: The Kargil Girl		Yes		
2021	Shershaah		Yes		
2021	Meenakshi Sundareshwar		Yes		
2021	Sooryavanshi		Yes		
2021	Ajeeb Daastaans		Yes		
2021	Searching for Sheela		Yes		Documentary
2022	Gehraiyaan		Yes		
2022	Jugjugg Jeeyo		Yes		
2022	Liger		Yes		
2022	Brahmāstra: Part One – Shiva		Yes		
2022	Govinda Naam Mera		Yes		
2023	Selfiee		Yes		
2023	Rocky Aur Rani Kii Prem Kahaani	Yes	Yes		
2023	Kill		Yes		
2024	Yodha		Yes		
2024	Ae Watan Mere Watan		Yes		
2024	Mr. & Mrs. Mahi		Yes		
2024	Bad Newz		Yes		Also directed "Jaanam" music video
2024	Jigra		Yes		
2025	Nadaaniyan		Yes		
2025	Akaal: The Unconquered		Yes		Punjabi film
2025	Kesari Chapter 2		Yes		
2025	Aap Jaisa Koi		Yes		
2025	Sarzameen		Yes		
2025	Dhadak 2		Yes		
2025	Homebound		Yes		
2025	Sunny Sanskari Ki Tulsi Kumari		Yes		
2025	Tu Meri Main Tera Main Tera Tu Meri		Yes		
2026	Accused		Yes		
2026	Viyaah Kartaare Da		Yes		Punjabi film
2026	Chand Mera Dil		Yes		

==== Acting roles ====
Year	Title	Role	Notes
1995	Dilwale Dulhania Le Jayenge	Monty	Also assistant director
2003	Kal Ho Naa Ho	Customer in café	Uncredited
2005	Home Delivery: Aapko... Ghar Tak	Himself	Cameo
2006	Alag	Himself	Cameo
2006	Kabhi Alvida Naa Kehna	Passenger on the train	Cameo
2007	Salaam-e-Ishq	Himself (voice)	Cameo
2007	Om Shanti Om	Himself	Cameo
2008	C Kkompany	Himself	Cameo
2008	Fashion	Himself	Cameo
2009	Luck by Chance	Himself	Cameo
2014	Hasee Toh Phasee	Client	Cameo
2015	Shamitabh	Himself	Cameo
2015	Shaandaar	Himself	Cameo
2015	All India Bakchod Knockout	Himself	Host
2015	Bombay Velvet	Kaizad Khambatta	
2018	Welcome To New York	Karan/Arjun	Double role
2018	Simmba	In Dance number	Cameo in song "Aankh Maarey"
2019	Good Newwz	Himself	Cameo in song "Chandigarh Mein"
2024	Modern Masters: S. S. Rajamouli	Himself	Documentary
2025	Sunny Sanskari Ki Tulsi Kumari	Himself	Cameo

=== Television ===
Year	Title	Role	Notes
1989	Indradhanush	Srikanth	
2004–present	Koffee with Karan	Host	Reality show
2008	Say Shava Shava	Judge	Reality show
2012–2022	Jhalak Dikhhla Jaa	Judge	Reality show
2012–2018	India's Got Talent	Judge	Reality show
2017	Dil Hai Hindustani	Judge	Reality show
2018	India's Next Superstars	Judge	Reality show
2020	What the Love! with Karan Johar	Host	Reality show
2021	Bigg Boss OTT 1	Host	Reality show
2021	IFFI opening ceremony	Host	Television special
2020–present	Fabulous Lives of Bollywood Wives	Guest	Reality show; also executive producer
2022	The Fame Game	—N/a	Executive producer
2022	Hunarbaaz: Desh Ki Shaan	Judge	
2022	Bigg Boss 16	Host	Reality show; (3rd & 18th week)
2023	Bigg Boss 17	Host	Reality show; (7th & 13th week)
2024	Showtime	—N/a	Executive producer
2024	Love Storiyaan	—N/a	Documentary; executive producer
2024	Gyaarah Gyaarah	—N/a	Executive producer
2024	Call Me Bae	—N/a	Executive producer
2024	The Tribe	—N/a	Reality show; executive producer
2025	Do You Wanna Partner	—N/a	Executive producer
2025	The Ba***ds of Bollywood	Himself	Cameo
2025–present	The Traitors India	Host	Reality show
2026	Student of the Year	—N/a	Producer

== Bibliography ==
- Johar, Karan; Saxena, Poonam (2017). An Unsuitable Boy. Penguin Books India. ISBN 978-0-670-08753-2.
