= Kal Ho Naa Ho =

2003 Indian film by Nikkhil Advani

- Theatrical release poster
- Directed by: Nikhil Advani
- Written by: Karan Johar
- Dialogues by: Niranjan Iyengar
- Produced by: Yash Johar
- Starring: Shah Rukh Khan; Saif Ali Khan; Preity Zinta; Jaya Bachchan
- Cinematography: Anil Mehta
- Edited by: Sanjay Sankla
- Music by: Shankar–Ehsaan–Loy
- Production company: Dharma Productions
- Distributed by: Yash Raj Films
- Release date: 28 November 2003
- Running time: 187 minutes
- Country: India
- Language: Hindi
- Budget: ₹28–32 crore
- Box office: ₹86.09 crore (initial run) ₹5.60 crore (re-release)

Kal Ho Naa Ho (transl. Tomorrow may or may not come, pronounced [kəl ɦoː naː ɦoː]), also abbreviated as KHNH, is a 2003 Indian Hindi-language romantic comedy drama film directed by Nikhil Advani, in his directorial debut, and written by Karan Johar. It is produced by Yash Johar under Dharma Productions. The film stars Shah Rukh Khan, Saif Ali Khan, and Preity Zinta, with Jaya Bachchan, Sushma Seth, Reema Lagoo, Lillete Dubey, and Delnaaz Irani in supporting roles. Set in New York City, the story follows Naina Catherine Kapur (Zinta) who gradually falls for her visiting neighbour Aman Mathur (Shah Rukh Khan), but a secret prevents Aman from reciprocating his feelings, causing him to set Naina up with her best friend, Rohit Patel (Saif Ali Khan).

Principal photography took place in Toronto, New York City, and Mumbai from January to October 2003. The music of the film was composed by Shankar–Ehsaan–Loy, in their first collaboration with Johar, with lyrics written by Javed Akhtar. The soundtrack was released on 27 September 2003 to positive reviews; the title song, "It's The Time To Disco", "Kuch To Hua Hai", and "Pretty Woman" were particularly well-received.

Kal Ho Naa Ho was released on 28 November 2003 with the promotional tagline, "A Story of a Lifetime ... In a Heartbeat". The film received acclaim from critics who praised its story, screenplay, direction, soundtrack, cinematography, and its cast performances. The film was a huge commercial success grossing ₹860.9 million (US$18.8 million), and was the highest grossing Hindi film and highest-grossing Indian film of the year. The film explores non-resident Indians, inter-caste marriage, and homosexuality through innuendo and homosocial bonding. It won two National Film Awards, eight Filmfare Awards, thirteen International Indian Film Academy Awards, six Producers Guild Film Awards, three Screen Awards, and two Zee Cine Awards in 2004.

== Plot ==
Naina Catherine Kapur is a pessimistic, uptight Punjabi American business student who lives in New York City with her widowed mother Jennifer, a Punjabi Christian, disabled brother Shiv, adopted sister Jiya and paternal grandmother Lajjo, a Punjabi Sikh. Jennifer runs an unsuccessful café with her neighbour, Jaswinder "Jazz" Kapoor. Lajjo is hostile to Jennifer and Jia as she believes that Jiya's adoption led her son (Jennifer's husband and Naina's father) to suicide.

Naina has two best friends: her classmate, Rohit Patel, an Indian Gujarati American, and Jaspreet "Sweetu" Kapoor, Jazz's sister. Her life is dull and overshadowed by the loss of her father until Aman Mathur and his mother move in next door with his uncle, Pritam Chaddha. Aman's cheerfulness gradually wins over Naina's family and he slowly starts to solve their problems. He suggests that they change the café to an Indian restaurant and its success alleviates their financial burdens. Aman encourages Naina to be happy and to live life to the fullest; she ends up falling in love with him.

Rohit also falls in love with Naina and asks Aman's help in expressing his feelings. Naina tells Rohit there is something she must say to him, leading him to think that she reciprocates his feelings. Naina reveals she is in love with Aman instead. Shaken, Rohit calls Aman to tell him what has happened. Naina goes to Aman's house and is shocked to see a wedding photograph of Aman and his wife, Priya. Heartbroken, she leaves.

Aman's mother confronts him about what has happened. He says he loves Naina but has decided to hide it because he is suffering from a fatal heart condition. He is not actually married. Priya is his childhood friend and doctor. Aman vows to bring Naina and Rohit together before he dies. He believes that Rohit will be able to provide for her better than he can. He hatches a plan to transform Naina and Rohit's bond, and gradually their friendship blossoms into love. Naina discovers his plan and chides Aman for trying to ruin her friendship with Rohit. Aman takes out Rohit's diary and confesses his feelings for Naina, saying they are Rohit's. Naina forgives Aman and Rohit.

Rohit proposes to Naina, and she accepts. Lajjo and Jennifer have a serious fight regarding Jiya, who calls on Aman for help. Aman had previously discovered the truth about Jiya's parents and despite Jennifer's objections, he reveals to Lajjo that her son had an extramarital affair and fathered Jiya. When Jiya's biological mother refused to accept her, Jennifer adopted her. Unable to deal with the guilt, Jennifer's husband committed suicide. An emotional Lajjo realises her mistakes and reconciles with Jennifer and Jiya. Naina gains closure after learning the truth about her father's death.

During Naina and Rohit's engagement, Aman has a heart attack. Only his mother knows he has been admitted to the hospital. Naina encounters Priya at a jewellery store, whom she recognises as Aman's wife. She introduces herself and her husband, Abhay, who reveals the truth about Aman. Shocked, Naina realises that Aman has sacrificed his love for her and leaves the mall in an emotional frenzy. Priya calls up Aman and informs him about what happened. Aman leaves the hospital and meets a frustrated Rohit, who asks why he and not Aman should marry Naina. Aman urges Rohit to marry Naina as a sign of respect for his dying wish to see Naina happy. Aman meets Naina, and they embrace while he tries to persuade her that he does not love her. Rohit and Naina's wedding, which Aman attends, takes place soon afterwards.

Sometime after the wedding, Aman is on his deathbed and says goodbye to everyone. He is left alone with Rohit after Naina leaves the room in tears. Aman makes him promise that, although Naina is with Rohit in this lifetime, he will get her in the next.

Twenty years later, a middle-aged Naina tells a grown-up Jiya how Aman affected every aspect of their lives. They are joined by her daughter Rhea and Rohit, who tells Naina that he loves her as they embrace.

== Cast ==
- Shah Rukh Khan as Aman Mathur
- Saif Ali Khan as Rohit Patel, Naina's Boyfriend/Bestfriend, then Husband
- Preity Zinta as Naina Catherine Kapur Patel (née Kapur), Rohit's girlfriend, then wife
- Jaya Bachchan as Jennifer "Jenny" Kapur, Naina's mother
- Sushma Seth as Lajwanti "Lajjo" Kapur, Naina's paternal grandmother
- Reema Lagoo as Namrata Mathur, Aman's mother
- Lillete Dubey as Jaswinder "Jazz" Kapoor, Naina's neighbour and Sweetu's sister
- Delnaaz Paul as Jaspreet "Sweetu" Kapoor, Naina's neighbour and Jazz's sister
- Shoma Anand as Kammo
- Kaamini Khanna as Vimmo
- Ketki Dave as Sarlaben Patel, Rohit's mother
- Sulbha Arya as Kantaben
- Athit Naik as Shiv Kapur, Naina's biological sister
- Jhanak Shukla as Jiya Kapur, Naina's adopted sister
- Satish Shah as Karsanbhai Patel, Rohit's father
- Rajpal Yadav as Guru
- Dara Singh as Pritam Chaddha

Special appearances

- Simone Singh as Camilla
- Sanjay Kapoor as Abhay Malhotra
- Kajol as a dancer in the song "Maahi Ve"
- Rani Mukerji as a dancer in the song "Maahi Ve"
- Sonali Bendre as Dr. Priya Malhotra
- Dheepesh Bhatt as Frankie Ramdayal
- Anaita Shroff Adajania as Geeta Parekh

Uncredited appearances

- Anil Mehta as Rajnath Kapur, Naina's, Shiv's and Jiya's late father and Jennifer's late husband
- Farah Khan and Karan Johar as customers in Jenny's restaurant
- Uday Chopra as a narrator who says "Day 6"

== Production ==
=== Development ===
It's about smiling and being happy today because no one has seen tomorrow. That's what I believe. Live for today because you never know what's in store tomorrow.

— Johar, on the film's title

Unhappy with the polarising response to his production, Kabhi Khushi Kabhie Gham... (2001), Karan Johar decided to make what he called "a cool film" with "a different energy" from his previous projects. He began working on the script for a film that would later be titled Kal Ho Naa Ho. Before the filming started, it was initially entitled Kabhi Alvida Naa Kehna, but Johar later changed it to Kal Ho Naa Ho, naming it after the song "Aisa Milan Kal Ho Naa Ho" from the 1997 film Hameshaa. He later used the former title Kabhi Alvida Naa Kehna for his 2006 film which was originally titled Kalank.

Around the same time, Nikhil Advani, who had served as an assistant director for Is Raat Ki Subah Nahin (1996), Kuch Kuch Hota Hai (1998), Mohabbatein (2000), and Kabhi Khushi Kabhie Gham... (2001), had planned to direct a spy thriller set in Kashmir featuring Shah Rukh Khan. Advani sent an initial draft to Johar and his father, Yash Johar. They felt it was controversial and did not want Advani to choose such a risky subject for his debut film. Johar described Kal Ho Naa Ho's script to Advani who agreed to direct the film if he could make it his way. Johar agreed since he preferred not to direct the film to avoid repeating previous mistakes. He later regretted the decision and thought about taking over from Advani but refrained from doing so out of courtesy. Advani said that Johar "underestimated himself" thinking he could not "do justice to it." In an interview with Sukanya Verma of Rediff.com, Advani described Kal Ho Naa Ho as "the story of a family which is bogged down with a lot of problems"; one man enters their lives "and solves all their problems and makes them realise how their problems are not as big as they are perceived to be."

=== Cast and crew ===
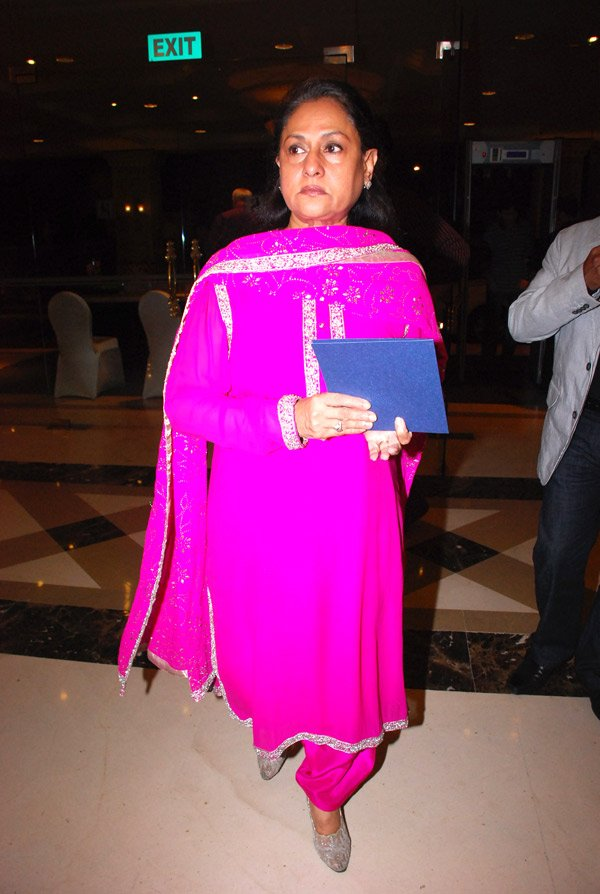
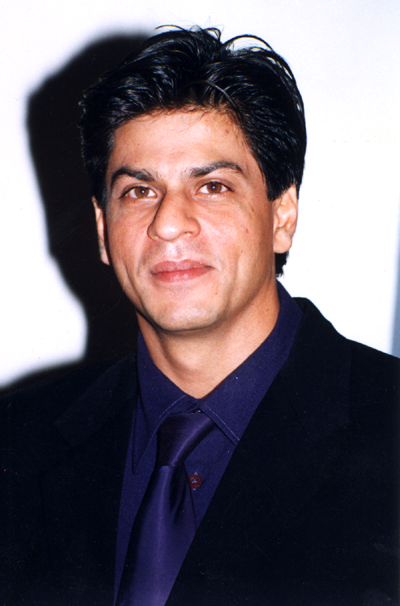
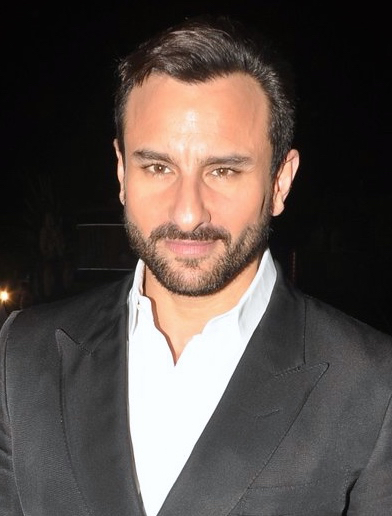
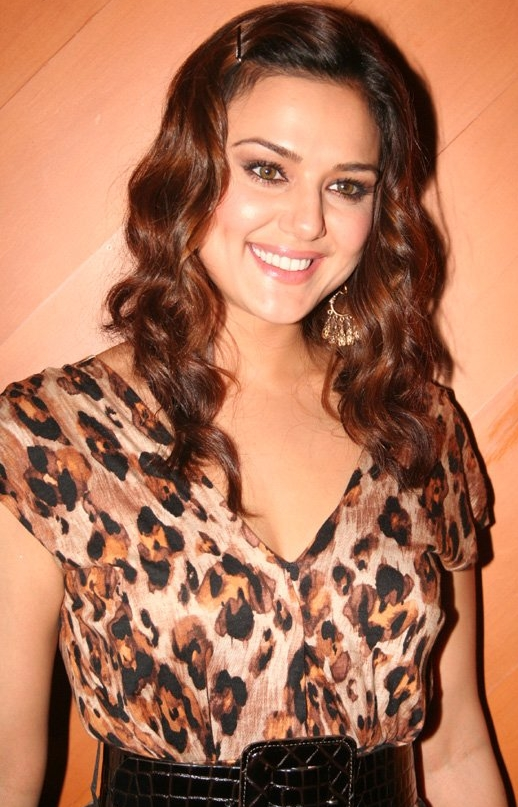
Clockwise from upper left: Jaya Bachchan, Shah Rukh Khan, Preity Zinta and Saif Ali Khan played Jennifer, Aman, Naina and Rohit, respectively.

Jaya Bachchan, Shah Rukh Khan, Saif Ali Khan and Preity Zinta were cast in the lead roles in December 2002. The first name of Shah Rukh Khan's character, Aman, was a departure from his previous collaborations with Johar where his first name in Kuch Kuch Hota Hai (1998) and Kabhi Khushi Kabhie Gham... (2001) was Rahul. Salman Khan and Kareena Kapoor were initially offered the roles of Rohit and Naina, respectively. Salman declined the offer because he did not wish to "play second fiddle", and Kapoor refused the role because of a salary dispute with Johar. Salman and Kapoor had previously collaborated with Johar on Kuch Kuch Hota Hai (1998) and Kabhi Khushi Kabhie Gham... (2001), respectively. Vivek Oberoi and Abhishek Bachchan, who would later collaborate with Johar on Kaal (2005) and Kabhi Alvida Naa Kehna (2006), respectively, were also considered for the role of Rohit. Thereafter, Saif and Zinta subsequently agreed to be part of the project.

Neetu Singh was approached for the role of Naina's mother, Jennifer, but she declined. It was then offered to Bachchan, who had previously collaborated with Johar on Kabhi Khushi Kabhie Gham... (2001) alongside her husband, Amitabh Bachchan, and was initially reluctant to take on the role. After Advani told her he would make the film in the style of Hrishikesh Mukherjee and Gulzar, both of whom were Bachchan's favourite directors, she changed her mind immediately, accepting the part. Kajol and Rani Mukerji who had previously collaborated with Johar together on both Kuch Kuch Hota Hai (1998) and Kabhi Khushi Kabhie Gham... (2001), made special appearances in the song "Maahi Ve". Vogue India fashion director Anaita Shroff Adajania made a cameo appearance as Geeta Parekh, Naina and Rohit's fellow MBA candidate. Farida Jalal was originally offered the role of Jennifer's mother-in-law, Lajwanti, despite being younger in real life than Bachchan. Jalal declined this role as she did not want to appear as Bachchan's onscreen mother-in-law, having starred alongside her in Kabhi Khushi Kabhie Gham... (2001), wherein she played a character similar to Bachchan's age. Thereafter, Sushma Seth, who had played Bachchan's mother in Kabhi Khushi Kabhie Gham... (2001), was cast in the role. Simone Singh, who had played Jalal’s daughter in Kabhi Khushi Kabhie Gham... (2001), was cast as Camilla in a guest appearance.

Kal Ho Naa Ho was the last film produced by Yash Johar before his death on 26 June 2004. While Karan wrote the story and screenplay, the dialogue was written by Niranjan Iyengar. Anil Mehta and Sanjay Sankla were signed as cinematographer and editor, respectively; Mehta also appeared briefly as Naina's father (Jennifer's husband) at the beginning of the film. Sharmishta Roy was the film's production designer. Farah Khan choreographed the song scenes and appeared as a customer in Jennifer's café. Arjun Kapoor worked in the film as an assistant director.

=== Costume design ===
The film's costumes were designed by Manish Malhotra. Zinta said in an interview with Subhash K. Jha that she preferred "a very 'preppy' look", similar to Ali MacGraw's in Love Story (1970), and wore glasses to indicate Naina's initially serious nature. Johar wanted Bachchan to wear jeans, believing that "it would be nice" for the audience "to see her in something unusual" and "break new ground" giving her a "fresh" look. Bachchan accepted without hesitation telling Johar, "If you are making it, I'll do it". Zinta designed and sewed the clothes for Gia's dolls in the film.

=== Pre-production ===
Johar and Advani were both fascinated with New York City and wanted to set Kal Ho Naa Ho there. Johar went to New York City while he worked on the film's script and stayed at least one-and-a-half months (Note: While Johar told Lata Khubchandani of Rediff.com in 2003 that he stayed in New York City for one-and-a-half months, he contradicted himself in his 2017 autobiography An Unsuitable Boy, where he wrote that he stayed there for three months.) studying the people, their culture, how they commute and the lifestyle of Americans and the non-resident Indians (NRI) there. He "sat in Central Park, stared at people, wrote the film, came back to Mumbai, narrated it to everybody, selected the cast."

The city appealed to Advani, since he believed it mirrored Naina's personality. He summarised the similarity between the two: "You can be surrounded by millions of people right in the middle of Grand Central Station. And you can be extremely lonely." He had never been to New York City before, and used the films of Woody Allen, Martin Scorsese, Rob Reiner and Nora Ephron to learn about life there. Like Johar, Advani analysed everything about the city:

When I went to scout for locations, I lived there for a month. I tried to imbibe everything there was in NY. I would just go and stand on the streets for an hour, observe people talking, make mental notes about how they walk, talk, how they don't look people in the eye. They are constantly on the move. I find that incredible.

=== Principal photography ===
Kal Ho Naa Ho was made on a budget of ₹220 million (about US$4,818,211 in 2003)–₹300 million (about US$6,570,302 in 2003). (Note: The average exchange rate in 2003 was 45.66 Indian rupees (₹) per 1 US dollar (US$).) Principal photography began on 20 January 2003 in Mumbai. Shah Rukh Khan became ill after four days of shooting and told Johar he would be unable to continue with the project, but Advani asked Johar to wait until the actor recovered. Khan's illness lasted for six months. Scenes with Saif Ali Khan and Zinta, including the song, "Kuch To Hua Hai", were shot in Toronto over an eight-day period in March–April 2003. Johar said in an interview with Subhash K. Jha that he tried to complete the film in Toronto thinking it would be a good substitute for New York City and avoid budget problems. He came to believe the idea was unoriginal and would not work out.

The 80-person production unit then moved to New York City for additional filming in July 2003, when Shah Rukh Khan joined them. Advani and Mehta wanted to capture the city's change of seasons from winter to summer to highlight the transformation of Naina's personality, but were unable to do so due to Shah Rukh Khan's illness. As a result, they filmed the sequences set in New York City during the summer.

Shooting in New York City began on 15 July, covering areas in and around the five boroughs and on Long Island. The street where Aman and Naina live was filmed in Brooklyn, where the unit camped for two weeks in local houses. A body double was used for Zinta's jogging scene during the film's opening credits since she had injured herself while shooting it. The Northeast blackout of 2003 forced the unit to cancel some filming. The shooting schedule in New York City lasted for fifty-two days. The final scenes, which included some songs, were filmed at the Filmistan Studios in Mumbai over about fifty days beginning in August 2003. Shooting ended in October 2003, with "Maahi Ve" being the last scene and song sequence filmed. According to Shah Rukh Khan, Kal Ho Naa Ho was made in sync sound as there were many indoor sequences in the film. He noted that sync sound "improved" his performance "considerably" describing it as "one of the biggest blessings for an actor."

Johar had planned the film's climax differently, but Yash Johar persuaded him that Aman should die. Given Shah Rukh Khan's screen persona, he believed Aman's death would have a bigger impact on the audience. In September 2015, Shah Rukh Khan revealed that Johar "made a special edit" of the film for his children as a favour to him; in this version, the film ends before his character dies.

== Thematic analysis ==
Kal Ho Naa Ho continued the trend set by Dilwale Dulhania Le Jayenge (1995) in which Indian family values are always upheld, regardless of the country of residence. Social and cultural analysis professor Gayatri Gopinath (author of Impossible Desires: Queer Diasporas and South Asian Public Cultures) noted how the film asserts "the essential Indianness" of its characters, and the entry of Aman Mathur gives them a sense of pride in their identity as Indians. This is seen when Aman helps overcome Jennifer Kapur's financial constraints by turning her café into an Indian restaurant and replacing the American flag with the Indian tricolour. In Postliberalization Indian Novels in English: Politics of Global Reception and Awards, Maria Ridda compares the film with Kuch Kuch Hota Hai because both films depict the internalisation of Western ideologies into Indian culture. Ridda agrees with Gopinath on the impact of Aman's transformation of Jennifer's café. She notes that all of Jennifer's friends and family work together on the renovation and it reinforces "a 'pan-Indian' sense of belonging."

In an extensive comparative analysis of Kal Ho Naa Ho with Siddharth Anand's 2005 film, Salaam Namaste, Cleveland State University School of Communication assistant professor Anup Kumar believes the films are similar representing "as an archetype" the "'unity in diversity'" of the characters. In Salaam Namaste, the characters are from across India—one is from Bangladesh. Kumar notes that the characters' last names "signify ethnicity and caste." In Kal Ho Naa Ho, Jennifer and Lajjo are a Christian and Punjabi Sikh, respectively; Rohit is a Gujarati. According to Kumar, Rohit and Naina's marriage symbolises the unity of the people of Punjab and Gujarat. Both films emphasise different aspects of marriage. In Salaam Namaste, central characters Nick and Ambar's (Saif Ali Khan and Zinta) professional careers come first and they are fearful of commitment. Conversely, in Kal Ho Naa Ho the tradition of love-cum-arranged marriage is encouraged.

Many critics noted Aman's resemblance to Rajesh Khanna's character, Anand Saigal, in Hrishikesh Mukherjee's Anand (1971). In both films, the protagonist is diagnosed with a terminal illness but believes in living life to the fullest. Despite accepting Aman and Anand's similar personalities, Mayank Shekhar of Mid-Day felt that the film had more in common with Farhan Akhtar's directorial debut, Dil Chahta Hai (2001), "in its look and lingos". Film journalists and critic, Komal Nahta, in his review of Kal Ho Naa Ho for Outlook, Ram Kamal Mukherjee of Stardust, Jitesh Pillai of The Times of India, and Paresh C. Palicha of The Hindu all agreed that the film is thematically similar to Anand. Each felt it shared common aspects with other films starring Khanna: 1970s Safar, where terminal illness is also a central motif, and Bawarchi (1972), in which the protagonist mends relationships between families and friends. Pillai also compared Shah Rukh Khan's death to Tom Hanks' in the 1993 legal drama, Philadelphia.

Some reviewers and scholars believe that Kal Ho Naa Ho has indirect homosexual themes. Manjula Sen of The Telegraph and Mimansa Shekhar of The Indian Express feel there is homosexual innuendo, particularly in scenes where Rohit's servant Kantaben finds Rohit and Aman in what she thinks are compromising situations, leading her to believe they are a couple. Dina Holtzman writes in her book, Bollywood and Globalization: Indian Popular Cinema, Nation, and Diaspora, that Aman's death was similar to the death of Jai (Amitabh Bachchan's character in the 1975 film, Sholay). According to Holtzman, their deaths broke the bond between the two male leads and were necessary to establish a normative heterosexual relationship between Rohit and Naina in Kal Ho Naa Ho, and Veeru and Basanti in Sholay.

== Music ==
The soundtrack featured seven original songs composed by the musical trio Shankar–Ehsaan–Loy (Note: Shankar–Ehsaan–Loy is a trio consisting of Shankar Mahadevan, Ehsaan Noorani and Loy Mendonsa.) and lyrics written by Javed Akhtar. The album was released by Sony Music India on 27 September 2003, with a physical launch event followed two days later at the Taj Lands End in Mumbai. The album had positive reviews and the title song, "It's the Time To Disco", "Kuch To Hua Hai" and "Pretty Woman" became popular.

== Release ==
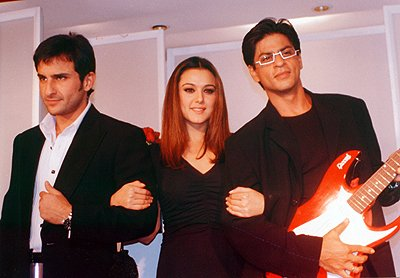
Saif Ali Khan, Zinta and Shah Rukh Khan (l-r) at an event for the film in 2003

Kal Ho Naa Ho was released on 28 November 2003, and promoted with the tagline, "A Story of a Lifetime ... In a Heartbeat". International distribution rights as well as rights to the film for the territories of Rajasthan, Punjab, Gujarat and Maharashtra were acquired by Yash Raj Films. The film won the Prix Du Public award when it was screened at the 2004 Valenciennes Film Festival. It was also shown at the Marrakech International Film Festival in 2005.

Costumes worn by Shah Rukh Khan, Saif Ali Khan, and Zinta were auctioned in December 2003 by Fame Adlabs in Mumbai. The film's script was added to the Margaret Herrick Library, the main repository of the Academy of Motion Picture Arts and Sciences, later that month.

== Reception ==
=== Critical response ===
==== India ====
Kal Ho Naa Ho received acclaim from critics, with the direction, story, screenplay, music, cinematography and performances gaining the most attention. Film critic and author Anupama Chopra praised Advani's direction, noting in her India Today review that he "emerges as a distinctive voice". Although she appreciated its technical aspects, she criticised the film's first half and its sub-plots. Mayank Shekhar called Kal Ho Naa Ho "a carefully constructed compendium of moments" which helped the audience "to feel lighter and to lighten up", concluding that "it works and is worth your entertainment bucks." Komal Nahta praised the film's direction, screenplay and lead performances—particularly Shah Rukh Khan, calling his character Aman "one of the best roles of his career." Ram Kamal Mukherjee described Zinta's performance as "astounding", saying that she "skillfully handled the hues of the complex character" and "walked through the character with elan." Mukherjee called Advani's and Johar's treatment of the story "unique", admiring the film's technical aspects and its treatment of homosexuality "with a dash of [humour], and thankfully by not degrading its social connection."

Jitesh Pillai described Johar's screenplay as "endearing", writing that it "pinwheels with abandon from the bachelor with a heart of gold to the obdurate female lead." Pillai also praised the performances of Shah Rukh Khan and Saif Ali Khan, particularly their on-screen relationship and comic timing. He called Shah Rukh Khan "wonderful", describing him as "the soul" of the film and writing that Saif Ali Khan's "joie de vivre makes it one of the most delectable performances seen in recent times." Rama Sharma of The Tribune thought that Shah Rukh Khan "infuses enough spark and affection", but was "overcharged" at times. He praised Mehta's cinematography for capturing nuances and "heightening the emotion."

In The Hindu, Paresh C. Palicha praised Iyengar's "witty and crispy" dialogue but criticised the characters' Indian accents. Another Hindu critic, Ziya Us Salam, agreed with Nahta that the film belonged to Shah Rukh Khan. Although Shah Rukh Khan "does the same thing over and over again", he performs his role "with such panache that all you can do is sit back and wait for that master artiste to unfold his magic again." A third review in The Hindu by Chitra Mahesh called Kal Ho Naa Ho "a smartly-made film" and praised Saif Ali Khan's performance, saying that "he has proved yet again what a wonderfully natural actor he is." However, she wrote that Shah Rukh Khan "tries too hard to impress".

Rohini Iyer of Rediff.com praised Kal Ho Naa Ho's "fresh" storytelling and "spicy humour", saying that Zinta "captures the spirit" of her character. She concluded her review by saying that the film "will carry you with its exuberance." According to Archana Vohra of NDTV, Advani "seems to have come up with an innovative way to present a done-to-death plot" and added: "Irrespective of the frills, fancy clothes and well-dressed stars, the film does strike a chord". Vohra, finding Bachchan "extremely well cast" as Jennifer and Saif Ali Khan's screen presence "electrifying", criticised Shah Rukh Khan for "playing the same kind of roles" as he did in Dilwale Dulhania Le Jayenge, Kuch Kuch Hota Hai and Kabhi Khushi Kabhie Gham, but he "isn't too bad. Just needs to go easy on the histrionics."

==== Overseas ====
Kal Ho Naa Ho received a rating of 70% on the review aggregator website Rotten Tomatoes based on 10 reviews, with an average rating of 7.25 out of 10. Metacritic, which uses a weighted average, has given the film a score of 54 based on four reviews, indicating "mixed or average reviews".

In a positive review, Dave Kehr of The New York Times described Kal Ho Naa Ho as "a vigorous Bollywood blend of romantic comedy and family melodrama" and "a rich meal that may best be reserved for stomachs accustomed to such bountiful fare." Writing for Variety, Derek Elley called the film a "slam-dunk" effort from Johar, with "a lightness of touch that sets it apart from the previous hits." Elley praised Saif Ali Khan and Zinta, noting that they "more than hold" their own "against a huge cast". Manish Gajjar of the BBC found the script "fresh and appealing", and that Advani proves "he has the natural ability to handle both the lighter and serious moments in the film." Gajjar termed Kal Ho Naa Ho a "well-crafted product".

David Parkinson of Radio Times wrote that the film "retains a distinctive Bollywood flavour", despite being inspired by "Hollywood romantic comedies". Parkinson criticised its length. He noted: "The pace slackens as plot demands take precedence over set pieces". Jami Bernard of the New York Daily News wrote, "Bollywood musicals, those big, loud, colorful extravaganzas from India, are an acquired taste and much of Kal Ho Naa Ho doesn't translate easily"; despite this mixed review, Bernard noted that the lead cast's characters "grow on you."

=== Box office ===
Kal Ho Naa Ho was successful at the box office, particularly overseas due to its New York City setting. Kal Ho Naa Ho was released on 400 screens across India and grossed ₹21.7 million (US$475,000 in 2003) on its opening day, the year's fourth-highest first-day earnings. It earned ₹67.1 million (US$1.47 million in 2003) by the end of its opening weekend, breaking Koi... Mil Gaya's record for the year's best opening weekend for Hindi films in India. At the end of its first week, the film collected ₹124.5 million (US$2.7 million in 2003). Kal Ho Naa Ho earned ₹581.8 million (US$12.7 million in 2003) in India and became the second-highest-grossing Indian film of 2003 in India, behind Koi... Mil Gaya.

Abroad, Kal Ho Naa Ho was released in 37 theatres in the United Kingdom. The film debuted in sixth place and grossed ₹29.41 million (about US$644,000 in 2003) over its first weekend, exceeded only by Kabhi Khushi Kabhie Gham. In the United States, where it premiered on 52 screens, it earned ₹34.62 million (US$758,000 in 2003) by the end of its four-day first weekend. By the end of its first week, the film had grossed ₹84.64 million ($1.8 million in 2003), the year's highest overseas first-week gross for an Indian film. In the first month after its release, Kal Ho Naa Ho collected about ₹180 million (US$3.9 million in 2003) in the UK and US, grossing in the UK top ten. It earned ₹279.1 million (US$6.1 million in 2003) overseas, becoming the year's highest-grossing Indian film world wide. Box Office India estimated the film's total collections to be ₹860.9 million (US$18.8 million in 2003), making it 2003's most profitable Indian film.

== Awards and nominations ==
At the 51st National Film Awards, Shankar–Ehsaan–Loy received the award for Best Music Direction and Sonu Nigam received the Best Male Playback Singer award. Kal Ho Naa Ho received eleven nominations at the 49th Filmfare Awards, and won eight—the most for any film that year, including: Best Actress (Zinta), Best Supporting Actor (Saif Ali Khan) and Best Supporting Actress (Bachchan). The film won 13 of its 16 nominations at the 5th IIFA Awards, including: Best Film, Best Actress (Zinta), Best Supporting Actor (Saif Ali Khan) and Best Supporting Actress (Bachchan).

== See also ==
- List of films set in New York City
- List of highest-grossing Indian films

== Bibliography ==
- Ausaja, S. M. M. (2009). Bollywood in Posters. Noida: Om Books International. ISBN 978-81-87108-55-9. Archived from the original on 7 April 2023.
- Gopinath, Gayatri (2005). Impossible Desires: Queer Diasporas and South Asian Public Cultures. Durham, North Carolina: Duke University Press. ISBN 978-0-8223-8653-7. Archived from the original on 7 April 2023.
- Holtzman, Dina (2011). "Between Yaars: The Queering of Dosti in Contemporary Bollywood Films". In Mehta, Rini Bhattacharya; Pandharipande, Rajeshwari (eds.). Bollywood and Globalization: Indian Popular Cinema, Nation, and Diaspora. London: Anthem Press. ISBN 978-0-85728-782-3. Archived from the original on 7 April 2023.
- Johar, Karan; Saxena, Poonam (2017). An Unsuitable Boy. Gurgaon: Penguin Random House. ISBN 978-0-670-08753-2.
- Kumar, Anup (2013). "Bollywood and the Diaspora: The Flip Side Of Globalization and Cultural Hybridity In Kal Ho Naa Ho and Salaam Namaste". In Medina-Rivera, Antonio; Wilberschied, Lee (eds.). Constructing Identities: The Interaction of National, Gender and Racial Borders. Cambridge: Cambridge Scholars Publishing. ISBN 978-1-4438-5092-6. Archived from the original on 7 April 2023.
- Ridda, Maria (2014). "Inside 'The Temple of Modern Desire': Recollecting and Relocating Bombay". In Viswamohan, Aysha Iqbal (ed.). Postliberalization Indian Novels in English: Politics of Global Reception and Awards. London: Anthem Press. ISBN 978-1-78308-334-3. Archived from the original on 7 April 2023.
- Varia, Kush (2012). Bollywood: Gods, Glamour, and Gossip. New York City: Columbia University Press. ISBN 978-1-906660-15-4. Archived from the original on 7 April 2023.
