= Gehraiyaan (soundtrack) =

2022 soundtrack album by Kabeer Kathpalia (OAFF) and Savera Mehta

Soundtrack album by Kabeer Kathpalia (OAFF) and Savera Mehta
- Released: 7 February 2022
- Recorded: 2021
- Genre: Feature film soundtrack
- Length: 18:26
- Language: Hindi
- Label: Sony Music India
- Producer: Kabeer Kathpalia; Savera Mehta
External audio
- Gehraiyaan - Full Album on YouTube

Kabeer Kathpalia chronology
| Ritu Goes Online (2020) | Gehraiyaan (2022) | Starfish (2023) |

Savera Mehta chronology
| Mislaid (2018) | Gehraiyaan (2022) | Starfish (2023) |

Singles from Gehraiyaan
- 1. "Doobey" Released: 24 January 2022; 2. "Gehraiyaan" Released: 31 January 2022

Gehraiyaan is the soundtrack album to the 2022 film of the same name directed by Shakun Batra and produced by Dharma Productions, Viacom18 Studios and Jouska Films starring Deepika Padukone, Siddhant Chaturvedi, Ananya Panday and Dhairya Karwa. The album consisted of six tracks composed by Kabeer Kathpalia a.k.a. OAFF and Savera Mehta with lyrics written by Kausar Munir and Ankur Tewari. The album, preceded by two singles, was released under the Sony Music India label on 7 February 2022. It was nominated for four International Indian Film Academy Awards and five Mirchi Music Awards, with a win for Upcoming Music Composer of The Year for the composers.

== Background ==
Gehraiyaan's soundtrack and musical score were composed by the independent musicians Kabeer Kathpalia a.k.a. OAFF and Savera Mehta. While the film marked Kathpalia's feature composition debut, it is also Mehta's sophomore as he was one of the composers in NH10 (2015). They curated three original songs, for which Ankur Tewari wrote one song and Kausar Munir did the same for two of the songs. The other three were reprise and remix versions of two of the original songs. Besides serving as the lyricist, Tewari also supervised the film's music.

Batra had listened to the duo's independent singles and liked it, which led him to contact the duo with the help of a fellow independent musician. As he demanded for a specific sound, he initially wanted them to produce the film score but thereafter also led them to compose the songs as well. Kathpalia added that during the COVID-19 pandemic where most of the listeners accessed to independent music and the booming surge which had resulted in their involvement in the film. During the discussions with Batra, the duo felt that their conversations were mostly "non-musical" as the former provided them a brief insight about the story and its relationship with emotions of the characters, which was about "what is this piece of music doing here and what should the music be here. That was a really fun challenge." Batra wanted the music to sync with the narrative.

According to Kathpalia, Tewari's involvement is to guide the duo on the music production. Tewari added that the duo's music was "kind of making sense when compared to the references that I was looking for [...] they were very sensitive to the story-telling." He also noted Batra's musical taste which helped him to create the specific soundscape and the kind of music he wanted for the film. In the process of curating the album, the duo evolved on using a distinct sound which was "atmospheric-pop" that provided a "cinematic, immersive and an attempt at creating a blend of atmospheric and pop music elements."

== Composition ==
Two songs: "Doobey" and "Gehraiyaan" was performed by Lothika Jha, a schoolmate of Kathpalia and Mehta. Jha being private in his musical performances, was bit scared of the possibility of "how wonderful it would be to put my work out there". The song "Doobey" appears in a critical juncture which was important to the character arc. Jha added that the music had to be "fun and sensual, but also reminiscent of that first time when you feel the rush of love". "Beqaboo" is an emotional number which had vocals by Shalmali Kholgade.

"Gehraiyaan" was an adapted Hindi-language version of the English song "Frontline" where the duo and Jha and collaborated, with the Hindi lyrics being written by Tewari. Batra listened to the original version, and had resonated with the melancholic pain as the characters go through, and the vibe worked in both situations which led them to localize and tweak it in a bit. Tewari had attributed it to the script which served him as the inspiration for writing the lyrics. Since it was an adaptation of an existing composition, the producers paid them a licensing fee in addition to a composing fee. A reprised version of the song was performed by Mohit Chauhan. Chauhan liked the original version of the song which led him to record the vocals for the reprise as well.

The album accompanied remix versions of "Doobey" and "Gehraiyaan" produced respectively by Sarvesh Shrivatsava (Sickflip) and Skeletron. The songs were mixed and mastered by Prathamesh Dudhane.

== Release ==
Gehraiyaan's soundtrack preceded by two singles: "Doobey" and "Gehraiyaan". The former was released with an accompanying music video on 24 January 2022, and the latter was released on 31 January. The album was released under the Sony Music India label on 7 February, featuring all the six tracks, and the music video for "Beqaboo" released two days later, on 9 February. The reprised version of "Gehraiyaan" was released on the occasion of Valentine's Day (14 February). An extended "deluxe edition" featuring the Lo-fi flip versions of "Doobey" and "Gehraiyaan" was released on 6 February 2023.

== Reception ==
In his review for Firstpost, Prathyush Parasuraman summarized "The vocals in the music of Gehraiyaan are strangely unsentimental, almost anesthetic, a trend in the music we have seen right from Prateek Kuhad to Ritviz." Ratan Priya of SheThePeople summarized "If we look at the greatest films ever made in Bollywood and compare their performances with their song albums, we will see that many of them did not have great albums. Some very lousy movies of the past have the best albums ever. What cannot be ignored however is that the album of a film titled Gehraiyaan (depth) has a significant lack of it." Rahul Desai of Film Companion described "the score – a mix of empty euphoria and whispery strings – sounds like an extension of not the film but its faces." Simran Singh of Daily News and Analysis wrote "The music of OAFF and Savera syncs perfectly with the plot. 'Doobey' transcends the maddening love between Alisha and Zain. Whereas the title track works delightful in the background."

== Track listing ==
Standard edition track listing
| No. | Title | Lyrics | Singer(s) | Length |
|---|---|---|---|---|
| 1. | "Doobey" | Kausar Munir | Lothika Jha, Savera Mehta | 3:39 |
| 2. | "Gehraiyaan" | Ankur Tewari | Lothika Jha, Savera Mehta, Kabeer Kathpalia | 2:59 |
| 3. | "Beqaaboo" | Kausar Munir | Savera Mehta, Shalmali Kholgade, Kabeer Kathpalia | 3:07 |
| 4. | "Gehraiyaan" (Reprise) | Ankur Tewari | Mohit Chauhan, Lothika Jha | 3:00 |
| 5. | "Doobey" (Sickflip Remix) | Kausar Munir | Lothika Jha, Sarvesh Shrivastava (Sickflip) | 3:17 |
| 6. | "Gehraiyaan" (Skeletron Remix) | Ankur Tewari | Lothika Jha, Skeletron | 2:24 |
| Total length: | | | | 18:26 |

Deluxe edition track listing
| No. | Title | Lyrics | Singer(s) | Length |
|---|---|---|---|---|
| 7. | "Doobey" (Lofi Flip) | Kausar Munir | Vibie, Lothika Jha, Savera Mehta | 3:51 |
| 8. | "Gehraiyaan" (Lofi Flip) | Ankur Tewari | Vibie, Lothika Jha, Savera Mehta, Kabeer Kathpalia | 2:09 |
| Total length: | | | | 24:28 |

== Background score ==
Gehraiyaan

Film score by Kabeer Kathpalia (OAFF) and Savera Mehta
- Released: 7 March 2022
- Recorded: 2021
- Genre: Feature film score
- Length: 19:41
- Language: Hindi
- Label: Sony Music India
- Producer: Kabeer Kathpalia; Savera Mehta

The film's background score was compiled into the 10-track album and released on 7 March 2022.

Original soundtrack listing
| No. | Title | Length |
|---|---|---|
| 1. | "Stuck" | 2:10 |
| 2. | "Attraction" | 1:11 |
| 3. | "Family Home" | 1:12 |
| 4. | "Al" | 1:15 |
| 5. | "End of the World" | 2:42 |
| 6. | "Undercurrent" | 1:22 |
| 7. | "The Bag" | 3:29 |
| 8. | "Recurring" | 3:41 |
| 9. | "Nostalgia" | 1:30 |
| 10. | "Spiral" | 1:03 |
| Total length: | | 19:41 |

== Awards and nominations ==
| Award (Note: Awards, festivals and organizations are in alphabetical order.) | Date of ceremony (Note: Date is linked to the article about the awards held that year, wherever possible.) | Category | Recipient(s) | Result | Ref. |
|---|---|---|---|---|---|
| International Indian Film Academy Awards | 26–27 May 2023 | Best Music Director | Kabeer Kathpalia and Savera Mehta | Nominated | |
| International Indian Film Academy Awards | 26–27 May 2023 | Best Lyricist | Ankur Tewari for "Gehraiyaan" | Nominated | |
| International Indian Film Academy Awards | 26–27 May 2023 | Best Male Playback Singer | Mohit Chauhan for "Gehraiyaan (Reprise)" | Nominated | |
| International Indian Film Academy Awards | 26–27 May 2023 | Best Female Playback Singer | Lothika Jha for "Doobey" | Nominated | |
| Zee Cine Awards | 18 March 2023 | Song of the Year | "Doobey" | Nominated | |
| Nickelodeon Kids' Choice Awards India | 27 June 2023 | Favourite Bollywood Song | "Doobey" | Nominated | |
| Mirchi Music Awards | 3 November 2023 | Album of The Year (Listeners' Choice) | — | Nominated | |
| Mirchi Music Awards | 3 November 2023 | Song of The Year (Listeners' Choice) | "Doobey" | Nominated | |
| Mirchi Music Awards | 3 November 2023 | Upcoming Female Vocalist of The Year | Lothika Jha for "Doobey" | Nominated | |
| Mirchi Music Awards | 3 November 2023 | Upcoming Female Vocalist of The Year | Lothika Jha for "Gehraiyaan" | Nominated | |
| Mirchi Music Awards | 3 November 2023 | Upcoming Music Composer of The Year | Kabeer Kathpalia and Savera Mehta for "Doobey" | Won | |
| Mirchi Music Awards | 3 November 2023 | Upcoming Music Composer of The Year | Kabeer Kathpalia and Savera Mehta for "Gehraiyaan" | Nominated | |
| Mirchi Music Awards | 3 November 2023 | Best Background Score | Kabeer Kathpalia and Savera Mehta | Nominated | |
