= Screen Award for Best Supporting Actress =

Annual film award in India

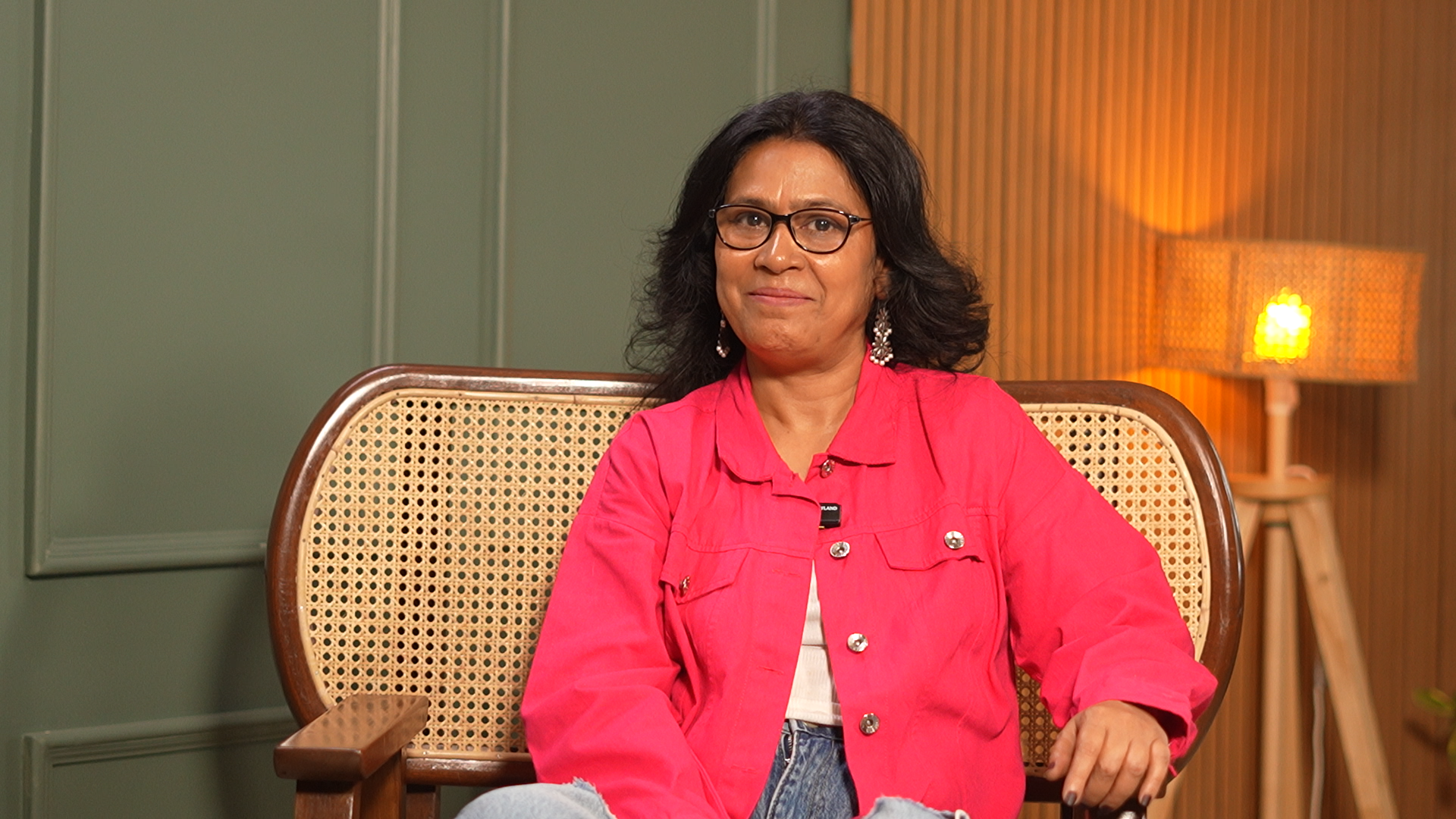
- The 2026 Recipient: Shalini Vatsa
- Awarded for: Best Performance by an Actress in a Supporting Role
- Country: India
- Presented by: Screen India
- First award: Mita Vashisht, Drohkaal (1995)
- Currently held by: Shalini Vatsa, Homebound
- Website: screenindia.com

The Screen Award for Best Supporting Actress is one of the Screen Awards of merit presented annually by a distinguished panel of judges from the Indian "Bollywood" film industry, to recognise an actress who has delivered an outstanding performance in a Supporting role. Though the awards began in 1994, the best supporting category for actresses was not introduced until 1995.

== Multiple wins ==
Wins	Recipient
2	Shabana Azmi

== Winners and nominees ==
Table key
Indicates the winner

† - Indicates the performance also "Won" the Filmfare Award for Best Supporting Actress.
‡ - Indicates the performance was also "Nominated" for the Filmfare Award for Best Supporting Actress.

=== 1990s ===
Year	Winner	Film
1995	Mita Vashisht	Drohkaal
1996	Not awarded	
1997	Seema Biswas	Khamoshi: The Musical
1998	Shabana Azmi	Mrityudand
1999	Shefali Shah	Satya
2000	Sushmita Sen	Biwi No.1

=== 2000s ===
Year	Actress	Film	Character
2001
2001	Sonali Bendre	Hamara Dil Aapke Paas Hai	Khushi Malhotra
2001	Aishwarya Rai ‡	Mohabbatein	Meghna Shankar
2001	Mahima Chaudhry ‡	Dhadkan	Sheetal Varma
2001	Reema Lagoo	Nidaan	Suhasini A. 'Suhas' Nadkarni
2001	Sonali Kulkarni ‡	Mission Kashmir	Neelima Khan
2002
2002	Raveena Tandon	Aks	Neeta
2002	Ananya Khare	Chandni Bar	Deepa Pandey
2002	Kareena Kapoor ‡	Kabhi Khushi Kabhie Gham	Pooja "Poo" Sharma
2002	Madhuri Dixit ‡	Lajja	Janki
2002	Rekha ‡	Lajja	Ramdulaari
2003
2003	Madhuri Dixit †	Devdas	Chandramukhi
2003	Antara Mali ‡	Company	Kannu
2003	Kirron Kher ‡	Devdas	Sumitra Mukherji
2003	Seema Biswas	Company	Ranibai
2003	Sushmita Sen ‡	Filhaal...	Sia Sheth
2004
2004	Juhi Chawla	3 Deewarein	Chandrika
2004	Jaya Bachchan †	Kal Ho Naa Ho	Jennifer Kapur
2004	Revathi	Dhoop	Sarita Kapoor
2004	Seema Biswas	Bhoot	Bai
2004	Shabana Azmi ‡	Tehzeeb	Rukhsana Jamal
2005
2005	Rani Mukerji †	Yuva	Sashi L. Singh
2005	Divya Dutta ‡	Veer-Zaara	Shabbo
2005	Kirron Kher	Hum Tum	Parminder Prakash / Bobby Aunty
2005	Kareena Kapoor	Yuva	Mira
2005	Rani Mukerji ‡	Veer-Zaara	Saamiya Siddiqui
2006
2006	Shweta Prasad ‡	Iqbal	Khadija
2006	Lillete Dubey	My Brother... Nikhil	Anita Rosario Kapoor
2006	Prateeksha Lonkar	Iqbal	Saida
2006	Shefali Shah ‡	Waqt: The Race Against Time	Sumitra Thakur
2006	Shernaz Patel	Black	Catherine McNally
2007
2007	Kirron Kher ‡	Rang De Basanti	Mitro
2007	Gul Panag	Dor	Zeenat
2007	Konkona Sen Sharma †	Omkara	Indu
2007	Ratna Pathak Shah	Yun Hota To Kya Hota	Tara
2007	Seema Biswas	Vivah	Rama
2008
2008	Chak De Girls	Chak De! India	Various
2008	Konkona Sen Sharma †	Life in a... Metro	Shruti Ghosh
2008	Shefali Shah	Gandhi My Father	Kasturba Gandhi
2008	Tisca Chopra ‡	Taare Zameen Par	Maya Awasthi
2009
2009	Shahana Goswami ‡	Rock On!!	Debbie
2009	Bipasha Basu ‡	Bachna Ae Haseeno	Radhika / Shreya Rathod
2009	Ila Arun	Welcome to Sajjanpur	Ramsakhi Pannawali
2009	Kangana Ranaut †	Fashion	Shonali Gujral
2009	Mugdha Godse	Fashion	Janet Sequeira
2009	Ratna Pathak Shah ‡	Jaane Tu... Ya Jaane Na	Savitri A. Rathore

=== 2010s ===
Year	Actress	Film	Character
2010
2010	Arundhati Nag ‡	Paa	Vidya's Mother
2010	Divya Dutta ‡	Delhi-6	Jalebi
2010	Gauahar Khan	Rocket Singh: Salesman of the Year	Koena Sheikh
2010	Neha Dhupia	Raat Gayi Baat Gayi	Archana / Sophia
2010	Shahana Goswami ‡	Firaaq	Muneera
2011
2011	Shernaz Patel	Guzaarish	Devyani Dutta
2011	Amrita Puri ‡	Aisha	Shefali Thakur
2011	Neha Chauhan	Love Sex Aur Dhokha	Rashmi
2011	Prachi Desai ‡	Once Upon A Time In Mumbaai	Mumtaz
2011	Zarina Wahab	Rakta Charitra	Jayalakshmi
2012
2012	Aditi Rao Hydari	Yeh Saali Zindagi	Shanti
2012	Kirti Kulhari	Shaitan	Tanya Sharma
2012	Parineeti Chopra ‡	Ladies vs Ricky Bahl	Dimple Chaddha
2012	Poorna Jagannathan	Delhi Belly	Menaka Vashisht
2012	Swara Bhaskar ‡	Tanu Weds Manu	Payal
2013
2013	Dolly Ahluwalia	Vicky Donor	Mrs. Arora
2013	Anushka Sharma ‡	Jab Tak Hai Jaan	Akira Rai
2013	Huma Qureshi ‡	Gangs Of Wasseypur	Mohsina Hamid
2013	Illeana D'Cruz ‡	Barfi!	Shruti Ghosh/Sengupta
2013	Rani Mukerji ‡	Talaash: The Answer Lies Within	Roshni Shekhawat
2013	Richa Chadda ‡	Gangs Of Wasseypur	Nagma Khatoon
2014
2014	Swara Bhaskar ‡	Raanjhanaa	Bindiya
2014	Divya Dutta	Gippi	Pappi
2014	Huma Qureshi	Ek Thi Daayan	Tamara
2014	Kalki Koechlin ‡	Yeh Jawaani Hai Deewani	Aditi Mehra
2014	Richa Chaddha	Goliyon Ki Raasleela Ram-Leela	Rasila
2015
2015	Seema Pahwa	Ankhon Dekhi	Amma
2015	Tabu †	Haider	Ghazala Meer
2015	Dimple Kapadia ‡	Finding Fanny	Rosalina "Rosie" Eucharistica
2015	Lisa Haydon ‡	Queen	Vijayalakshmi
2015	Tejaswini Kolhapure	Ugly	Shalini Bose
2016
2016	Priyanka Chopra †	Bajirao Mastani	Kashibai
2017
2017	Shabana Azmi †	Neerja	Rama Bhanot
2017	Aishwarya Rai Bachchan	Ae Dil Hai Mushkil	Saba Taliyar Khan
2017	Ratna Pathak Shah ‡	Kapoor & Sons	Sunita Kapoor
2017	Surveen Chawla	Parched	Bijli
2017	Tabu	Fitoor	Begum Hazrat Jaan
2018
2018	Meher Vij †	Secret Superstar	Najma Malik
2018	Neha Dhupia	Tumhari Sulu	Maria Sood
2018	Aahana Kumra	Lipstick Under My Burkha	Leela
2018	Anjali Patil	Newton	Malko Netam
2018	Seema Pahwa ‡	Shubh Mangal Saavdhan	Sugandha's Mother
2019
2019	Surekha Sikri †	Badhaai Ho	Dadi
2019	Divya Dutta	Blackmail	Dolly Verma
2019	Pushpa Joshi	Raid	Amma Ji
2019	Radhika Apte	Andhadhun	Sophie
2019	Rasika Dugal	Manto	Safia
2019	Swara Bhaskar ‡	Veere Di Wedding	Sakshi Soni

=== 2020 ===
Year	Actress	Film	Character
2020
2020	Kamini Kaushal	Kabir Singh	Sadhna Kaur "Dadi"
2020	Amrita Singh	Badla	Rani Kaur
2020	Seema Pahwa	Bala	Mausi
2020	Vaani Kapoor	War	Naina Verma
2020	Zaira Wasim	The Sky Is Pink	Aisha Chaudhary

== See also ==
- Screen Awards
- Bollywood
- Cinema of India
