= Showtime (Indian TV series) =

2024 Indian Hindi drama television series

- Genre: Drama
- Created by: Sumit Roy
- Written by: Sumit Roy; Lara Chandni; Mithun Gangopadhyay
- Directed by: Mihir Desai; Archit Kumar
- Starring: Naseeruddin Shah; Emraan Hashmi; Mahima Makwana; Mouni Roy; Rajeev Khandelwal; Shriya Saran; Vishal Vashishtha
- Theme music composer: Anand Bhaskar
- Country of origin: India
- Original language: Hindi
- No. of seasons: 1
- No. of episodes: 7

Production
- Executive producers: Karan Johar; Apoorva Mehta; Somen Mishra; Mihir Desai
- Camera setup: Multi-camera
- Production company: Dharmatic Entertainment

Original release
- Network: Disney+ Hotstar
- Release: 8 March 2024

Showtime is an Indian Hindi-language drama television series created by Sumit Roy. It delves into the world of Bollywood, production houses and how they function. It features the power struggles and off-camera fights occurring in the backstage areas of Bollywood. Produced by Dharmatic Entertainment the show premiered on 8 March 2024 on Disney+ Hotstar.

== Cast ==
- Naseeruddin Shah as Viktor Khanna, a former producer and founder of Viktory Studios, Raghu's father, Mahika's maternal grandfather
- Emraan Hashmi as Raghu Khanna, a producer, Viktor and Sarika's son, Mahika's maternal half-uncle
- Mahima Makwana as Mahika Nandy, a journalist turned producer, Viktor and Devika's granddaughter, Paromita's daughter, Raghu's half-niece
- Mouni Roy as Yasmine Ali, an item girl, Raghu's girlfriend
- Rajeev Khandelwal as Armaan Singh, a Bollywood superstar, Mandira's husband
- Shriya Saran as Mandira Singh, a former actress, Armaan's wife
- Vishal Vashishtha as Prithvi, a writer and employee of Viktory studios, Mahika's boyfriend
- Vijay Raaz as Saajan Morarka, an industrialist and alcohol baron
- Gurpreet Saini as Ziko, Raghu's loyal employee
- Denzil Smith as Deven, Viktor's friend and loyal employee
- Neeraj Madhav as Satya Krishnan; a critically acclaimed writer and filmmaker
- Vandana Joshi as Meena Chandra; actress in the film '1857'
- Payal Arora as Surbhi, Prithvi’s sister
- Akshay Anand Kohli as Parth, Surbhi’s husband
- Lovkesh Solanki as Montu Morarka, Saajan's Son
- Shataf Figar as Rustom Boxwala, an investor and founder of Regal Star Studios
- Lillete Dubey as Sarika Khanna, Viktor's second wife, Raghu's mother

=== Guest ===
List of actors and filmmakers who appeared in cameos.

- Dharmendra
- Janhvi Kapoor
- Mrunal Thakur
- Neha Dhupia
- Angad Bedi
- Nitesh Tiwari
- Hansal Mehta
- Vasan Bala
- Neetu Kapoor
- Rakesh Roshan
- Prem Chopra
- Manish Malhotra

== Production ==
The first teaser featuring all the star cast was released on 20 December 2023. Further, on 9 February 2024, the release date was announced to be 8 March. On 13 February 2024, the trailer featuring star cast was launched.

== Broadcast ==
The first four episodes were released on 8 March 2024. Next three episodes were released on 12 July 2024.

== Reception ==
=== Critical reception ===
Showtime received mixed reviews from critics, who praised its production design, dialogues and performances, but were polarised about its writing. Saibal Chatterjee of NDTV gave the series a 2.5 rating stating, "The principal quintet of actors in Showtime is a diverse lot who bring different performative styles to bear upon the characters that they play." Devansh Sharma of Hindustan Times says, "Showtime also works as a spot-the-reference spectator sport because of how zeitgeisty it is. Dialogue writers Jehan Handa and Karan Sharma oscillate from bombarding the audience with the obvious to allowing them to read between the lines."

Sukanya Verma of Rediff.com rates the show 2.5 and states, "But with only four episodes out and a loose sense of a conflict, it's hard to form a definite opinion about a show that is always watchable but never engrossing." While Nandini Ramnath of Scroll.in states, "There isn’t enough hard work, at least from the available episodes, to understand just yet whether Showtime is the expose we have been waiting for or yet another half-hearted effort to lure us in by promising dirt. The series fares well when it aims for low-hanging fruit, such as the silly things that Bollywood people do because they can’t see beyond their noses."

Rahul Desai of Film Companion in the Part 1 review says, "Somewhere along the way, intent morphs into blind-item content - content that makes it hard to tell a publicity spot from actual series." Shubhra Gupta from The Indian Express rated the show 2 stars, and stated, "Karan Johar’s by-the-number series on Bollywood’s inner workings lacks bite." Snigdha Nalini from Outlook India rates the show 2.5 stars and says, "There are no revelations, nothing too dramatic."

=== Viewership ===
Showtime appeared twice in the top 5 most-viewed list shows of the week clocking 5.7 million views and 4.4 million views, respectively.
