= Rocky Aur Rani Kii Prem Kahaani =

2023 Indian film by Karan Johar

- Theatrical release poster
- Directed by: Karan Johar
- Written by: Ishita Moitra; Shashank Khaitan; Sumit Roy
- Dialogues by: Ishita Moitra
- Produced by: Hiroo Yash Johar; Karan Johar; Apoorva Mehta
- Starring: Ranveer Singh; Alia Bhatt; Dharmendra; Jaya Bachchan; Shabana Azmi; Aamir Bashir
- Cinematography: Manush Nandan
- Edited by: Nitin Baid
- Music by: Pritam
- Production companies: Dharma Productions; Viacom18 Studios
- Distributed by: Viacom18 Studios
- Release date: 28 July 2023
- Running time: 168 minutes 178 minutes (Extended version)
- Country: India
- Language: Hindi
- Budget: ₹160 crore
- Box office: ₹355.61 crore

Rocky Aur Rani Kii Prem Kahaani (transl. Rocky and Rani's Love Story) is a 2023 Indian Hindi-language romantic comedy film directed by Karan Johar and written by Ishita Moitra, Shashank Khaitan, and Sumit Roy. Produced by Dharma Productions and Viacom18 Studios, the film stars Ranveer Singh and Alia Bhatt as a couple with contrasting personalities who decide to live with each other's families for three months prior to marriage. The supporting cast includes Dharmendra, Jaya Bachchan, Shabana Azmi, Tota Roy Chowdhury, Churni Ganguly, Aamir Bashir, and Kshitee Jog.

The project was officially announced in July 2021 and marked Johar's return to feature film direction following Ae Dil Hai Mushkil (2016). Principal photography commenced in August 2021 and concluded in March 2023, with filming taking place across Mumbai, New Delhi, and Jammu and Kashmir. The schedule and release were delayed due to Bhatt's pregnancy. Pritam composed the soundtrack and background score, with lyrics by Amitabh Bhattacharya, while Saregama acquired the audio rights in a strategic shift from Johar's norm. Manush Nandan handled the cinematography, and Nitin Baid served as editor.

Rocky Aur Rani Kii Prem Kahaani was released theatrically on 28 July 2023 to positive reviews from critics and audiences. Produced on a budget of ₹160 crore (US$19 million) with an additional ₹18 crore (US$2.1 million) spent on marketing, the film grossed over ₹355 crore (US$42 million) worldwide. It emerged as a commercial success and became the tenth highest-grossing Indian film of 2023 and the seventh highest-grossing Hindi film of the year.

At the 69th Filmfare Awards, Rocky Aur Rani Kii Prem Kahaani received a leading 20 nominations, including Best Film, Best Director (Johar), and Best Actor (Singh), and won four awards: Best Actress (Bhatt) and Best Supporting Actress (Azmi), Best Dialogue, and Best Costume Design. At the 71st National Film Awards, the film won 2 awards: Best Popular Film Providing Wholesome Entertainment and Best Choreography (Vaibhavi Merchant for "Dhindhora Baje Re").

== Plot ==
The Randhawas are a wealthy Punjabi family who run a successful confectionery business named Dhanlakshmi Sweets, led by the authoritative matriarch, Dhanlakshmi Randhawa. Her husband, Kanwal Randhawa, uses a wheelchair and suffers from memory loss following an accident. Their son, Tijori, mirrors Dhanlakshmi's controlling nature and dominates the household alongside her. Tijori's family includes his submissive wife Punam and their children, Rocky and Gayatri.

One day, Kanwal mistakenly kisses a stranger, believing her to be a woman named Jamini. Concerned for his grandfather, Rocky investigates and discovers an old photograph of Jamini. His search leads him to Jamini's granddaughter Rani Chatterjee, a well-known Bengali television news anchor. Rani hails from an intellectual family—her mother Anjali is an English professor and her father Chandon is a Kathak dancer.

Rocky and Rani arrange a meeting between Kanwal and Jamini, who are revealed to have shared a brief extramarital affair in 1978. Rekindling their bond, Kanwal and Jamini's interactions bring Rocky and Rani closer, and the two begin a relationship. Although Rocky proposes, Rani initially dismisses it as a temporary fling but later realises her love for him.

Due to the cultural differences between their families, Rocky and Rani decide to live with each other's households for three months to better understand their backgrounds. Rani encourages the women in the Randhawa family to assert their independence, drawing the ire of Dhanlakshmi and Tijori. Meanwhile, Rocky faces ridicule from the Chatterjees for his limited education and patriarchal attitudes, but gradually begins to change. He later apologises for his earlier behavior while calling them out for the ridicule and joins Chandon's dance classes to better appreciate his perspective.

During Durga Puja celebrations, Rocky and Chandon perform together, upsetting Tijori. The resulting confrontation leads Rani to push Tijori in anger, causing a rift between her and Rocky. Back home, when Tijori attempts to strike Punam, Rocky intervenes and stands up to him for the first time. As he is about to leave the household with Punam and Gayatri, the shock causes Kanwal to briefly regain clarity and recognize his son before dying.

Months later, Tijori visits the Chatterjee home to apologise. Rocky and Rani reunite and get married. Though Dhanlakshmi does not attend the wedding, she sends Rani the secret family recipe, symbolically accepting her into the family.

== Cast ==
The cast is listed below:

- Ranveer Singh as Rocky Randhawa, Rani's boyfriend
- Alia Bhatt as Rani Chatterjee, Rocky's girlfriend
- Jaya Bachchan as Dhanlakshmi Randhawa, Rocky's grandmother
  - Kashish Rizwan as young Dhanlakshmi
- Dharmendra as Kanwal Randhawa, Rocky's grandfather
  - Harman Singha as young Kanwal Randhawa
- Shabana Azmi as Jamini Chatterjee, Rani's grandmother
  - Veebha Anand as young Jamini
- Tota Roy Chowdhury as Chandon Chatterjee, Rani's father
- Churni Ganguly as Anjali Chatterjee, Rani's mother
- Aamir Bashir as Tijori Randhawa, Rocky's father
  - Vansh Sayani as young Tijori
- Kshitee Jog as Punam Randhawa, Rocky's mother
- Anjali Anand as Gayatri "Golu" Randhawa, Rocky's sister
- Namit Das as Somen Mitra
- Abhinav Sharma as Vicky, Rocky’s friend
- Sheeba as Mona Sen
- Karmveer Choudhary as Vicky's grandfather
- Raj Singh Arora as Rehan
- Arjun Bijlani as Harry
- Bharti Singh as Pushpa
- Haarsh Limbachiyaa as Ravi
- Shraddha Arya as Rupa
- Sriti Jha as Jaya
- Arjit Taneja as Sunny
- Hitesh Arora as Gopal Rana
- Raashul Tandon as Yashpal Rana
- Navneet Nishan as Yashpal's mother
- Jitendra Gaur as Ratan
- Benazir Shaikh as Minty, Vicky's bride

Varun Dhawan, Janhvi Kapoor, Sara Ali Khan and Ananya Panday make cameo appearances in the song "Heart Throb".

== Production ==
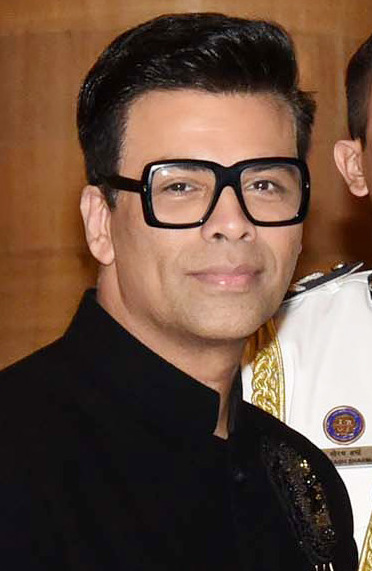
Karan Johar returned to feature film direction after seven years with Rocky Aur Rani Kii Prem Kahaani

=== Development ===
Rocky Aur Rani Kii Prem Kahaani was officially announced on 6 July 2021 by director Karan Johar through his social media accounts, with the title initially stylized as Rocky Aur Rani Ki Prem Kahani. The announcement confirmed Ranveer Singh and Alia Bhatt in the titular roles, alongside Dharmendra, Jaya Bachchan, and Shabana Azmi in key supporting parts. The project marked Johar's return to feature film direction following Ae Dil Hai Mushkil (2016), and notably, his first directorial venture not to feature frequent collaborator Shah Rukh Khan in any capacity; Khan had appeared in all of Johar's previous directorial ventures, including the joint production venture My Name Is Khan (2010), with the notable exception of Student of the Year (2012), which saw him partner up as a presenter and producer and marked Bhatt's debut, while Ae Dil Hai Mushkil featured both Bhatt and Khan in separate cameo appearances.

Johar began developing the film during the COVID-19 pandemic after his planned historical drama Takht—which also featured Singh and Bhatt and was to be written by Sumit Roy and Hussain Haidry—was postponed indefinitely. He assembled a writer's room comprising Ishita Moitra, Shashank Khaitan, and Roy to develop the story, screenplay and dialogues. Khaitan, who was given his first big break by Johar, had notably worked with Bhatt and cameo star Varun Dhawan, her fellow debutante in Student of the Year alongside Sidharth Malhotra, in his first two films; he and Johar later produced Malhotra-starrer Yodha (2024), which was his first independent production debut.

=== Casting ===
The film marked Jaya Bachchan’s return to acting after over a decade; she had last worked with Johar in Kabhi Khushi Kabhie Gham (2001) and Kal Ho Naa Ho (2003). She was confirmed to play the female antagonist. Dharmendra agreed to join the project, stating that the role suited his age and screen image, and expressing enthusiasm about reuniting with Bachchan and Shabana Azmi after several decades. The role of Jamini was initially offered to Sharmila Tagore, a frequent collaborator of Dharmendra, but she exited the project before production began due to a cancer diagnosis. Anjali Anand, a television actress, was cast in her first film role as a member of the Randhawa family. Saswata Chatterjee was originally approached for the role of Chandon Chatterjee but declined the offer; the part eventually went to Tota Roy Chowdhury, whom Chatterjee later stated was “his biggest regret” to have turned down. Bashir and Azmi were previously supposed to work with Johar on My Name Is Khan (2010), but while Azmi opted out due to scheduling conflicts with other projects, Bashir was replaced due to a rejected visa application.

Johar stated that the character of Rocky was inspired by gym-going Instagram influencers from West Delhi whom he came across during the pandemic. To prepare for the role, Singh trained with Delhi-based influencer Yuvraj Dua, learning his dialect and body language. For the Chatterjee household, Roy Chowdhury trained in Kathak for six months to authentically portray a professional dancer. Johar cited his own childhood experiences of being mocked for dancing effeminately as inspiration for the character. Singh also trained for over a month for the “Dola Re Dola” dance sequence, choreographed by Vaibhavi Merchant, who noted that he was initially nervous as he was not a trained classical dancer. The Randhawa family home was filmed at Gaur Mulberry Mansions, a luxury residential complex in Greater Noida.

=== Filming ===
Principal photography began on 20 August 2021 in Mumbai. The second schedule commenced in October 2021 in New Delhi. The third schedule, initially planned for early 2022, was delayed due to the surge of the Omicron variant variant of COVID-19 and resumed in April 2022 in and around Mumbai and Delhi. In August 2022, television actors Arjun Bijlani, Shraddha Arya, Sriti Jha, and Arjit Taneja filmed cameo appearances for a sequence in the film. Later that month, Dharma Productions released a video announcing the completion of principal photography, except for one song which was delayed due to Bhatt's pregnancy. The final song, "Tum Kya Mile", was filmed in March 2023 in Jammu and Kashmir, marking the end of the shoot.

Johar cited influences from classic Yash Chopra films for the visual aesthetic of “Tum Kya Mile”, and referenced the grandeur of Sanjay Leela Bhansali’s filmmaking in designing the “Dhindora Baje Re” sequence. He also included a tribute to actress Sadhana through the song “What Jhumka?”, which adapts the 1966 track “Jhumka Gira Re” from Mera Saaya.

The film's initial cut was three hours and twelve minutes long. Following multiple test screenings with over 500 participants, Johar and editor Nitin Baid edited the film over a period of six months, ultimately reducing the runtime to two hours and forty-eight minutes.

== Soundtrack ==
The film's music was composed by Pritam, with lyrics written by Amitabh Bhattacharya, both in their second collaboration with Karan Johar after Ae Dil Hai Mushkil. Pritam described the soundtrack as a "homage" to the music of Hindi cinema from the 1960s and 1970s. The audio rights were acquired by Saregama for ₹30 crore (US$3.5 million), replacing Johar's norm label for his directorial ventures, Sony Music India, a decision he described as both strategic and sentimental. He noted that Saregama—formerly His Master's Voice—had released the music of early Dharma Productions titles such as Gumrah (1993) and Duplicate (1998). The acquisition also granted the filmmakers access to Saregama's catalogue of vintage Hindi film music without requiring separate licensing, which Johar had to comply with in both Student of the Year and Ae Dil Hai Mushkil, where old songs were extensively used, particularly in the latter.

The soundtrack was promoted through a series of singles. The first, "Tum Kya Mile", was released on 28 June 2023. The second single, "What Jhumka?", an adaptation of Madan Mohan’s 1966 classic "Jhumka Gira Re", was released on 12 July. This was followed by "Ve Kamleya" on 18 July, and "Dhindhora Baje Re" on 24 July. The full album, comprising 13 tracks, was released digitally on 31 July 2023.

== Release and marketing ==
=== Release ===
Rocky Aur Rani Kii Prem Kahaani was initially scheduled for release on 10 February 2023 but was postponed to 28 April due to delays in filming resulting from Alia Bhatt’s pregnancy. The release was further deferred to avoid a box office clash with Ponniyin Selvan: II, a high-budget Tamil-language film directed by Mani Ratnam. The film was ultimately released theatrically on 28 July 2023.

The film was selected for screening at the 28th Busan International Film Festival on 9 October 2023, where it featured in the "Open Cinema" section. It was also showcased at the 2023 Taipei Golden Horse Film Festival, where it had three special screenings, and at the 23rd River to River Florence Indian Film Festival on 10 December 2023, where it won the award for Best Feature Film.

The streaming rights were acquired by Amazon Prime Video for ₹80 crore (US$9.5 million), while the satellite broadcasting rights were sold to Colors TV for ₹30 crore (US$3.5 million).

=== Marketing ===
The film's first teaser was launched on 20 June 2023 by actor Shah Rukh Khan, a frequent collaborator of Johar, marking the first time he was not involved in any capacity with Johar's directorial work; in his launch, he referred to Johar's producer father Yash and described the film as Johar's comeback to the screens. The official trailer was released on 4 July 2023. To promote the film, Bhatt and Singh participated in a five-city promotional tour across India, including visits to Kolkata, Chandigarh, and Jaipur.

The Central Board of Film Certification required several modifications prior to the film's release, including edits to profanity and the removal of a reference to politician Mamata Banerjee. Bhatt stated in an interview that the changes were minor and did not affect the film's narrative flow.

== Reception ==
=== Box office ===
Rocky Aur Rani Kii Prem Kahaani grossed ₹182.86 crore (US$22 million) in India and ₹172.75 crore (US$20 million) overseas, for a worldwide total of ₹355.61 crore (US$42 million). The film emerged as a commercial success, ranking as the seventh highest-grossing Hindi film of 2023.

The film had a moderate opening day in India, earning ₹11 crore (US$1.3 million) nett. Collections increased over the weekend, with Saturday earnings of ₹15.5 crore (US$1.8 million) and a total of ₹44.5 crore (US$5.3 million) by Sunday. Overseas, it performed particularly well in North America, the United Kingdom, the Gulf, and Australia, grossing US$4 million in its first weekend. In the UK, it had the second-biggest opening for a Hindi film in 2023, following Pathaan, and ranked seventh over the weekend, earning £370,882. On Monday, the film maintained strong collections in India (₹6.75 crore/US$800,000) and grossed US$770,000 internationally. Domestic collections held steady through Tuesday, and the film performed best in Indian urban multiplexes and overseas markets throughout its first week.

In its second weekend, the film registered a drop of around 30% in India, earning ₹31 crore (US$3.7 million). In North America, it declined by less than 5%, grossing US$1.64 million for a cumulative total of US$4.72 million. Other overseas markets saw only a 20% drop in collections. Despite competition from Gadar 2 and OMG 2, the film continued to perform well into its third weekend. By the third week, it had grossed over US$15 million internationally, becoming one of the highest-grossing Hindi films of the year in overseas territories.

=== Critical response ===
The film received generally positive reviews from critics and audiences. On Rotten Tomatoes, 83% of 23 reviews are positive, with an average rating of 6.7/10.

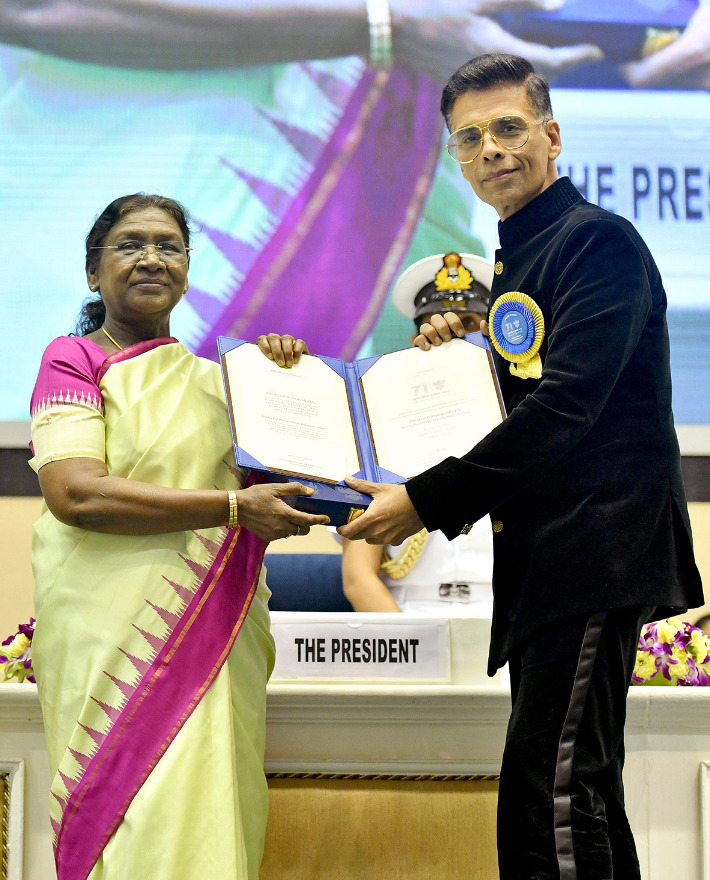
Karan Johar receiving the National Film Award for Best Popular Film Providing Wholesome Entertainment at the 71st National Film Awards.

Anupama Chopra of Film Companion called the film "delicious eye-candy with a rebellious core" and praised the ensemble cast. Mayank Shekhar of Mid-Day described it as “a top of the pop-culture moment” and singled out Singh's performance as a highlight. Taran Adarsh of Bollywood Hungama termed it a "well-packaged entertainer" that appeals to both youth and family audiences. Tushar Joshi of India Today called it a gentle reminder of Johar's cinematic legacy, while Dhaval Roy of The Times of India described it as “a full-on entertaining and sweet love story.” The Telegraph's Priyanka Roy referred to it as a “vastly entertaining film” that balances substance and spectacle, and Sukanya Verma of Rediff.com described it as a "shrewd subversion of traditions and values." Mayur Sanap, also from Rediff.com, felt the film “blends old charm with the newness of fresh ideas.” Reya Malhotra of The Week considered it a feminist reimagining of Johar's Kabhi Khushi Kabhie Gham (2001).

Shomini Sen of WION credited both Singh and Bhatt with elevating a predictable script, while Uday Bhatia of Mint Lounge wrote that Singh's energy made the film “more fun than it has a right to be.” In contrast, Shubhra Gupta of The Indian Express criticized the film for being “loud and melodramatic” with “little originality.” Nandini Ramnath of Scroll.in found it “ostentatious” and filled with stereotypes, and Saibal Chatterjee of NDTV called it a “shiny but shallow family drama” that failed to fully deliver its message, though he praised Bhatt's performance.

Internationally, Ryan Gilbey of The Guardian highlighted the film's attempt to reconcile progressivism and tradition, while Proma Khosla of IndieWire described it as "the kind of Bollywood bliss audiences have been craving," praising the performances of Singh, Bhatt, and Bachchan.

=== Year-end lists ===
Several critics and publications included Rocky Aur Rani Kii Prem Kahaani in their year-end best film lists. Subhash K. Jha named it the best Hindi film of 2023, while The Indian Express's Shubhra Gupta and Film Companion's Anupama Chopra also featured it in their annual top selections. The Hindu’s Shilajit Mitra listed it among the ten best Hindi films of the year, and Vogue India named it one of the fifteen best Bollywood films of 2023. Film Companion included it among both the top ten pan-Indian films and top five Hindi films of the year. Additional inclusions came from Harper's Bazaar India, Rediff.com, The Quint, WION, Mint, ThePrint, The Wire, and Rolling Stone India, where it was ranked second among Bollywood films.

The performances of Ranveer Singh and Alia Bhatt also received widespread recognition. Indiatimes listed both among the top fifteen performances of the year, while Bollywood Hungama named Bhatt the best actress of 2023. Rishabh Suri of Hindustan Times included Singh’s role among the best male performances in Hindi cinema that year.

== Accolades ==
Award	Date of the ceremony	Category	Recipients	Result	Ref.
GQ Men of the Year Awards	22 November 2023	Director of the Year	Karan Johar	Won	
River to River Florence Indian Film Festival	13 December 2023	Best Feature Film	Rocky Aur Rani Kii Prem Kahaani	Won	
Filmfare Awards	28 January 2024	Best Film	Rocky Aur Rani Kii Prem Kahaani	Nominated	
Filmfare Awards	28 January 2024	Best Director	Karan Johar	Nominated	
Filmfare Awards	28 January 2024	Best Actor	Ranveer Singh	Nominated	
Filmfare Awards	28 January 2024	Best Actress	Alia Bhatt	Won	
Filmfare Awards	28 January 2024	Best Supporting Actor	Tota Roy Chowdhury	Nominated	
Filmfare Awards	28 January 2024	Best Supporting Actress	Jaya Bachchan	Nominated	
Filmfare Awards	28 January 2024	Best Supporting Actress	Shabana Azmi	Won	
Filmfare Awards	28 January 2024	Best Music Director	Pritam	Nominated	
Filmfare Awards	28 January 2024	Best Lyricist	Amitabh Bhattacharya for "Tum Kya Mile"	Nominated	
Filmfare Awards	28 January 2024	Best Male Playback Singer	Shahid Mallya for "Kudmayi"	Nominated	
Filmfare Awards	28 January 2024	Best Female Playback Singer	Shreya Ghoshal for "Tum Kya Mile"	Nominated	
Filmfare Awards	28 January 2024	Best Female Playback Singer	Shreya Ghoshal for "Ve Kamleya"	Nominated	
Filmfare Awards	28 January 2024	Best Story	Ishita Moitra, Shashank Khaitan, Sumit Roy	Nominated	
Filmfare Awards	28 January 2024	Best Screenplay	Ishita Moitra, Shashank Khaitan, Sumit Roy	Nominated	
Filmfare Awards	28 January 2024	Best Dialogue	Ishita Moitra	Won	
Filmfare Awards	28 January 2024	Best Cinematography	Manush Nandan	Nominated	
Filmfare Awards	28 January 2024	Best Production Design	Amrita Mahal Nakai	Nominated	
Filmfare Awards	28 January 2024	Best Costume Design	Manish Malhotra, Eka Lakhani	Nominated	
Filmfare Awards	28 January 2024	Best Choreography	Ganesh Acharya for "What Jhumka?"	Won	
Filmfare Awards	28 January 2024	Best Choreography	Vaibhavi Merchant for "Dhindhora Baje Re"	Nominated	
Bollywood Hungama Best of 2023	12 – 17 January 2024	Best Actor (Female)	Alia Bhatt	Honoured	
Bollywood Hungama Best of 2023	12 – 17 January 2024	Best Supporting Actor (Male)	Tota Roy Chowdhury	Honoured	
Bollywood Hungama Best of 2023	12 – 17 January 2024	Best Supporting Actor (Female)	Shabana Azmi	Honoured	
Bollywood Hungama Best of 2023	12 – 17 January 2024	Best Dialogue	Ishita Moitra	Honoured	
Bollywood Hungama Best of 2023	12 – 17 January 2024	Best Lyrics	Amitabh Bhattacharya for "Tum Kya Mile"	Honoured	
Bollywood Hungama Best of 2023	12 – 17 January 2024	Best Playback Singer (Male)	Arijit Singh for "Tum Kya Mile"	Honoured	
Bollywood Hungama Best of 2023	12 – 17 January 2024	Best Choreography	Ganesh Acharya for "What Jhumka?"	Honoured	
News 18 Reel Awards	9 March 2024	Best Film	Rocky Aur Rani Kii Prem Kahaani	Nominated	
News 18 Reel Awards	9 March 2024	Best Director	Karan Johar	Won	
News 18 Reel Awards	9 March 2024	Best Actor (Male)	Ranveer Singh	Nominated	
News 18 Reel Awards	9 March 2024	Best Actor (Female)	Alia Bhatt	Nominated	
News 18 Reel Awards	9 March 2024	Best Supporting Actor (Male)	Tota Roy Chowdhury	Won	
News 18 Reel Awards	9 March 2024	Best Supporting Actor (Female)	Jaya Bachchan	Nominated	
News 18 Reel Awards	9 March 2024	Best Supporting Actor (Female)	Shabana Azmi	Won	
News 18 Reel Awards	9 March 2024	Best Supporting Actor (Female)	Churni Ganguly	Nominated	
News 18 Reel Awards	9 March 2024	Best Music	Pritam	Nominated	
News 18 Reel Awards	9 March 2024	Best Singer (Male)	Arijit Singh for "Tum Kya Mile"	Nominated	
News 18 Reel Awards	9 March 2024	Best Singer (Female)	Shreya Ghoshal for "Tum Kya Mile"	Nominated	
News 18 Reel Awards	9 March 2024	Best Singer (Female)	Jonita Gandhi for "What Jhumka?"	Nominated	
Zee Cine Awards	10 March 2024	Best Film	Rocky Aur Rani Kii Prem Kahaani	Nominated	
Zee Cine Awards	10 March 2024	Best Actor	Ranveer Singh	Nominated	
Zee Cine Awards	10 March 2024	Best Actress	Alia Bhatt	Nominated	
Zee Cine Awards	10 March 2024	Best Costume Design	Manish Malhotra, Eka Lakhani	Won	
Pinkvilla Screen and Style Icons Awards	18 March 2024	Best Film (Popular Choice)	Rocky Aur Rani Kii Prem Kahaani	Nominated	
Pinkvilla Screen and Style Icons Awards	18 March 2024	Best Director (Popular Choice)	Karan Johar	Nominated	
Pinkvilla Screen and Style Icons Awards	18 March 2024	Best Actor (Popular Choice)	Ranveer Singh	Nominated	
Pinkvilla Screen and Style Icons Awards	18 March 2024	Best Actress (Popular Choice)	Alia Bhatt	Nominated	
Pinkvilla Screen and Style Icons Awards	18 March 2024	Best Director (Jury's Choice)	Karan Johar	Won	
Pinkvilla Screen and Style Icons Awards	18 March 2024	Best Actress (Jury's Choice)	Alia Bhatt	Nominated	
Pinkvilla Screen and Style Icons Awards	18 March 2024	Best Supporting Actress	Shabana Azmi	Won	
Pinkvilla Screen and Style Icons Awards	18 March 2024	Best Music Album	Pritam	Nominated	
Indian Film Festival of Melbourne	17 August 2024	Best Film	Rocky Aur Rani Kii Prem Kahaani	Nominated	
Indian Film Festival of Melbourne	17 August 2024	People's Choice Award	Rocky Aur Rani Kii Prem Kahaani	Won	
Indian Film Festival of Melbourne	17 August 2024	Best Director	Karan Johar	Nominated	
Indian Film Festival of Melbourne	17 August 2024	Best Actor	Ranveer Singh	Nominated	
Indian Film Festival of Melbourne	17 August 2024	Best Actress	Alia Bhatt	Nominated	
International Indian Film Academy Awards	28 September 2024	Best Film	Rocky Aur Rani Kii Prem Kahaani	Nominated	
International Indian Film Academy Awards	28 September 2024	Best Director	Karan Johar	Nominated	
International Indian Film Academy Awards	28 September 2024	Best Actor	Ranveer Singh	Nominated	
International Indian Film Academy Awards	28 September 2024	Best Actress	Alia Bhatt	Nominated	
International Indian Film Academy Awards	28 September 2024	Best Supporting Actor	Dharmendra	Nominated	
International Indian Film Academy Awards	28 September 2024	Best Supporting Actor	Tota Roy Chowdhury	Nominated	
International Indian Film Academy Awards	28 September 2024	Best Supporting Actress	Jaya Bachchan	Nominated	
International Indian Film Academy Awards	28 September 2024	Best Supporting Actress	Shabana Azmi	Won	
International Indian Film Academy Awards	28 September 2024	Best Original Story	Ishita Moitra, Shashank Khaitan, Sumit Roy	Won	
International Indian Film Academy Awards	28 September 2024	Best Music Director	Pritam	Nominated	
International Indian Film Academy Awards	28 September 2024	Best Playback Singer Female	Shreya Ghoshal for "Tum Kya Mile"	Nominated	
International Indian Film Academy Awards	28 September 2024	Best Dialogue	Ishita Moitra	Won	
National Film Awards	23 September 2025	Best Popular Film Providing Wholesome Entertainment	Rocky Aur Rani Kii Prem Kahaani	Won	
National Film Awards	23 September 2025	Best Choreography	Vaibhavi Merchant for "Dhindhora Baje Re"	Won	
