= Peepli Live =

2010 Indian satirical comedy film

- Theatrical release poster
- Directed by: Anusha Rizvi
- Screenplay by: Anusha Rizvi
- Story by: Anusha Rizvi
- Produced by: Aamir Khan; Kiran Rao
- Starring: Omkar Das Manikpuri; Raghubir Yadav; Shalini Vatsa; Malaika Shenoy; Nawazuddin Siddiqui; Naseeruddin Shah
- Cinematography: Shanker Raman
- Edited by: Hemanti Sarkar
- Music by: Indian Ocean; Brij Mandal; Bhadwai; Nagin Tanvir; Ram Sampath
- Production company: Aamir Khan Productions
- Distributed by: UTV Motion Pictures
- Release date: 13 August 2010
- Running time: 104 minutes
- Country: India
- Language: Hindi
- Budget: ₹10 crore
- Box office: est. ₹46.85 crore

Peepli Live is a 2010 Indian satirical black comedy film that explores the topic of farmer suicides and the subsequent media and political response. It is written and directed by Anusha Rizvi in her directorial debut, and produced by Aamir Khan Productions. The film stars Naya Theatre company member Omkar Das Manikpuri as well as Naseeruddin Shah, Raghubir Yadav, Nawazuddin Siddiqui, Shalini Vatsa and Malaika Shenoy along with a number of newcomers. Peepli Live, distributed by UTV Motion Pictures, was released on 13 August 2010.

Peepli Live was India's official entry for the 83rd Academy Awards Best Foreign Film category although it was not nominated.

== Plot ==
Natha is a poor farmer from the village of Peepli in Mukhya Pradesh who struggles to earn enough money for his family. After taking a trip to the city with his elder brother, Budhia, Natha discovers that the banks will seize his farm if he does not pay off his outstanding loans. Meanwhile, the Mukhya Pradesh government has called a by-election where the opposition party believes they have a chance to form the government. The agricultural, poverty-stricken population has lost faith in the long-serving ruling party, whose Chief Minister, along with the Federal Agriculture Minister, believe in the industrialisation of rural areas.

Natha and Budhia request financial help from the village headman, who mockingly suggests that they commit suicide, after which his family will receive monetary compensation for his death from the government. Budhia encourages Natha to do this for the sake of his family, but Natha is hesitant. While the two discuss at a tea stall, Rakesh, a local journalist, overhears the conversation and reports Natha's impending suicide on the news. The report quickly spreads to national news channels; one high-profile journalist, Nandita, joins Rakesh to interview Natha and his family. A rival channel also picks up the story, and each competes to report on Natha's suicide, increasingly intruding on his private life.

The media at large soon descends on Peepli to await Natha's suicide, monitoring him at all hours. Natha becomes a celebrity, attracting visitors and businesses to the village. The ruling party tries to bribe Natha to prevent him from committing suicide, fearing it will galvanize the opposition. Conversely, the opposition encourages Natha to commit suicide, hoping to win the election while also using media attention to advance their own agendas. Rakesh, meanwhile, discovers a poor farmer in Peepli has died after his land was seized by a bank. He proposes writing a piece about the farmer to Nandita, who becomes frustrated and instructs Rakesh to concentrate on Natha's story.

The village headman, allied with the ruling party, secretly kidnaps Natha and holds him ransom from the opposition parties. Rakesh tracks down Natha to a warehouse in Peepli and contacts Nandita, who rushes to the location; however, the rest of the media follow her there, suspecting she has a lead on Natha. In the resulting confusion, a spill from a Petromax lamp sets fire to the warehouse, which explodes, killing Rakesh. Government officials mistake Rakesh's badly burnt body for Natha's; after ruling that the death was an accident, the government refuses to compensate Natha's family, leaving them helpless. After Natha's death is reported, visitors and media depart from Peepli, leaving it decrepit. Before driving off, Nandita briefly wonders what happened to Rakesh.

As the film ends, Natha is shown to have escaped to Gurgaon, where he works as a day labourer in the construction industry.

== Cast ==
- Omkar Das Manikpuri as Natha
- Raghubir Yadav as Budhia
- Malaika Shenoy as Nandita Malik
- Nawazuddin Siddiqui as Rakesh
- Naseeruddin Shah as Saleem Kidwai, the Agriculture Minister
- Aamir Bashir as Vivek Vashisht
- Anoop Trevedi as Thanedar Jugan
- Ishita Vyas as Reporter
- Shalini Vatsa as Dhaniya
- Indira Tiwari as Reporter
- Avijit Dutt as Boss of English TV Channel
- Farrukh Jaffar as Amma
- Vishal O Sharma as Kumar Deepak
- Sitaram Panchal as Bhai Thakur
- Sandeep Yadav as cameraman of Nandita Malik

== Production ==
Peepli Live began as a script written by NDTV journalist Anusha Rizvi called The Fallen. In 2004 Rizvi asked Aamir Khan to read her script and, although he initially refused as he was preoccupied with shooting Mangal Pandey: The Rising, he eventually decided to finance the film after she described the plot to him. In an interview, Khan explains the meaning of the movie title: "When we were looking for the right title before we began the publicity and promotions of the film, we came up with Peepli Live. Peepli is the village that film is set in, the "live" part is meant to indicate: here is a story that is happening in Peepli that the filmmaker is bringing to you live. That's why it's Peepli Live." Peepli Live was filmed on various locations in Madhya Pradesh such as Bhopal, Indore, Tikamgarh, Khurai as well as in New Delhi. Maxima Basu designed the costumes aptly capturing the rural essence of the film. According to Aamir Khan, many of the actors are Adivasis from the sub-urban area of Bhopal, Bhadwai in Madhya Pradesh. Other cast members are from playwright Habib Tanvir's theatre troupe Naya Theatre.

== Release ==
Peepli Live competed in the Sundance Film Festival, the first film from India to achieve this feat. With support of media billionaire Keyur Patel of Fuse Global who is major hollywood financier "Peepli Live" was selected at Sundance Film Festival and his relationship with Robert Redford provided a great platform there. It received an 'A' adult certificate in India for language use. The movie was picked up by speciality German distribution company Rapid Eye Movies for a special screening at the Berlin International Film Festival. It was also named the Best First Feature Film at the 31st Durban International Film Festival in South Africa. In the United Kingdom, the film was released on 24 September. Peepli Live reportedly recovered its cost before its release itself.

== Reception ==
=== Critical reception ===
Peepli Live received positive reviews. Subhash K. Jha, film critic and author of The Essential Guide to Bollywood, describes Peepli Live as "a work of damning ramifications." He further states that, "To most of us out here sitting in the auditorium, farmers' suicide is just a headline. Read, regretted and then put to bed. Peeply (Live) is that savagely raw and hurtful wake-up call for the conscience which does not mince words." Nikhat Kazmi of the Times of India gave the film three and a half out of five stars stating," How smart can Indian cinema get? Exhilarating answer: Very smart. And that's the bottomline of Peepli Live, a small little film, that showcases the real India without glossing over the contradictions of our fumbling-bumbling democracy or getting overtly sentimental about garibi and the attendant grime that goes with it. Pratim D. Gupta of The Telegraph wrote "Peepli Live demands to be absorbed and not just watched over the weekend" and praised the director Anusha Rizvi – "she has the gift of the dark humour satire ala Shyam Benegal and in her uncompromised shooting style, she shows the fire of Mira Nair". Taran Adarsh of Bollywood Hungama gave it four and a half out of five stars and argues that "the concept [farmers' suicides] would instinctively translate into a serious, thought-provoking film. But Peepli [Live] takes a grim and solemn issue, turns it into a satire, garnishes it with populist sentiment and makes a far greater impact than a mere documentary, had it tackled the burning issue. In fact, like all Aamir Khan films, Peepli [Live] marries realism with a winning box-office formula most brilliantly." Mayank Shekhar of The Hindustan Times gave the film four out of five stars arguing that "the satire is irresistible; the subtext, compelling. And yet neither shows itself up in any form of self-seriousness. The comic writing is immaculately inspired". Noyon Jyoti Parasara of Yahoo gave the film 3.5 out of five and said, "Peepli [Live] is a class act and director Anusha Rizvi and producer Aamir Khan could take a bow for working this into reality". Rajeev Masand of CNN-IBN also gave it three and a half out of five stars, calling it "a scathing satire on the country's apathy towards the rural class, and specifically towards farmers, Peepli Live employs a comic tone to tell a serious story. The witty script turns Natha into something of a local celebrity, who draws out the true character and motivations of all those who cross his path." Mathures Paul of The Statesman gave the film 4 out of 5 stars noting that, "Anusha Rizvi demolishes successfully whatever little faith we had in the political process. Peepli (Live) is entertaining and inspiring".

As of June 2020, the film holds an 86% approval rating on Rotten Tomatoes, based on 28 reviews with an average rating of 6.32 out of 10. On Metacritic, the film had an average score of 69 out of 100, based on 12 reviews, indicating "Generally Favorable" reviews.

=== Box office ===
According to Box Office India, Peepli Live took a good start and did a business of ₹40 million (US$430,000) on its first day. The film collected ₹299.1 million (US$3.2 million) by the end of its third week and was declared a super hit. Overseas, the film opened to a limited release at 64 places in the U.S., and was ranked third, grossing $350,054 in the domestic market and $700,000 worldwide in its opening weekend.

== Awards and nominations ==
2011 Filmfare Awards

- Nominated: Filmfare award for Best Film
- Nominated: Filmfare award for Best Costume Design

2011 Star Screen Awards

- Winner : Star Screen Award for Best Ensemble Cast

6th Apsara Film & Television Producers Guild Awards

- Winner : Apsara Award for Best Story – Anusha Rizvi
- Nominated : Apsara Award for Best Performance in a Comic Role – Omkar Das Manikpuri
- Nominated : Apsara Award for Best Actor in a Supporting Role (Male) – Raghubir Yadav
- Nominated : Apsara Award for Best Actor in a Supporting Role (Female) – Farukh Jaffer

2011 Zee Cine Awards

- Nominated : Best Film
- Nominated : Best Comedian – Omkar Das Manikpuri

5th Asian Film Awards

- Winner : Best Composer – Indian Ocean
- Nominated : Best Film – Aamir Khan
- Nominated : Best Newcomer – Omkar Das Manikpuri
- Nominated : Best Editor – Hemanti Sarkar

3rd Mirchi Music Awards

- Winner : Upcoming Lyricist of The Year – Bhadwai Village Mandali – "Mehngai Dayain"
- Nominated : Upcoming Lyricist of The Year – Noon Meem Rashid – "Chola Maati Ke Ram"
- Nominated : Male Vocalist of The Year – Bhadwai Village Mandali – "Mehngai Dayain"
- Nominated : Music Composer of The Year – Bhadwai Village Mandali – "Mehngai Dayain"
- Nominated : Music Composer of The Year – Nageen Tanvir – "Chola Maati Ke Ram"

== Soundtrack ==
Peepli Live

Soundtrack album by Indian Ocean, Raghubir Yadav, Nageen Tanvir and Ram Sampath
- Genre: Feature film soundtrack
- Label: T-Series

The music is composed by Indian Ocean, an Indian band and Ram Sampath.

=== Track listing ===
No.	Title	Lyrics	Music	Singer(s)	Length
1.	"Chola Maati Ke Ram"	Gangaram Sakhet	Nageen Tanvir	Nageen Tanvir	3:14
2.	"Des Mera"		Indian Ocean, Sanjeev Sharma	Indian Ocean	4:55
3.	"Des Mera – I"		Indian Ocean, Sanjeev Sharma	Indian Ocean	4:55
4.	"Mehngai Dayain"		Brij Mandal, Bhadwai	Raghubir Yadav, Brij Mandal, Bhadwai	3:57
5.	"Zindagi Se Darte Ho"		Indian Ocean	Indian Ocean	7:30
6.	"Mehngai Dayain" (Remix)		Ram Sampath	Raghubir Yadav	4:37

== Controversies ==
The film was subject to a few controversies. VJAS (Vidarbha Janandolan Samiti), the Nagpur-based farmer's advocacy group, asked the Maharashtra government to ban the film due to its depiction of farmer suicides. Kishor Tiwari, the president of VJAS, stated: "TV serial 'Bairi Piya' has shown that debt-trapped Vidarbha farmers are selling daughters to clear their debt, while 'Peepli Live' is far from reality and an insult to poor farmers of Vidarbha who have been victims of globalization and wrong policies of the state."

In addition, according to the Hindustan Times, "folk singer Rama Joshi alleges that a song Chola Mati Ke Ram, which has been used in the film, does not give credit to Gangaram Siwar, a celebrated folk singer of Chhattisgarh and the original lyricist of the folk song." In response, Nageen Tanwir, who sang the song in the film, stated: "The song, Chola Maati Ke Ram, has been composed by Gangaram Siwar in Chhattisgarh, but the Habib Tanvir theatre group has officially purchased rights for the song. So I don't understand why people from Chhattisgarh are asking for their due again."

Also, according to John Travolta, Peepli Live was inspired by the 1997 English film Mad City. In an interview with The Hindu, he stated that he was astonished to learn that India's official entry for the Oscars this year, Peepli Live, was inspired by Mad City, his best film as an actor.

The film's storyline also shared similarity to the Malayalam film Pakal. The director of the film, M. A. Nishad, said that: "The storyline of the Hindi film, Peepli Live, has a similar theme to my Pakal, which was released much before. The difference was in the narrative style."

The song, "Mehngai Dayan Khaye Jat Hai", was challenged in court by the Congress Party alleging that Sonia Gandhi was named as the "Dayan" (female ghost) in the song. However, the argument did not sustain judicially and the case was eventually dismissed by the court holding that Sonia Gandhi was not responsible for the rising inflation in India.

== See also ==
- List of submissions to the 83rd Academy Awards for Best Foreign Language Film
- List of Indian submissions for the Academy Award for Best Foreign Language Film
