= Searching for Sheela =

- Poster
- Directed by: Shakun Batra
- Produced by: Karan Johar; Apoorva Mehta; Somen Mishra
- Edited by: Nitesh Bhatia
- Music by: Benedict Taylor; Naren Chandavarkar
- Production companies: Dharmatic Entertainment; Jouska Films
- Distributed by: Netflix
- Release date: 22 April 2021
- Running time: 58 minutes
- Country: India
- Languages: English; German; Gujarati; Hindi

Searching for Sheela is a 2021 Indian documentary film created, directed and executive produced by Shakun Batra. The film traces the life of Ma Anand Sheela, who was the spokesperson of the Rajneesh movement, when she returns to India for the first time in 35 years. The film is produced by Karan Johar's Dharmatic Entertainment and was released on Netflix on 22 April 2021.

== Reception ==
On the review aggregator website Rotten Tomatoes, 38% of eight critics' reviews are positive, with an average rating of 3.80/10.

Sayan Ghosh of The Hindu noted that the film "barely manages to scratch the surface, leaving bare a hollow exterior, despite concerted efforts to conceal it within a shiny facade." Tatsam Mukherjee from Firstpost called the film a "crime against journalism" and "so tremendously low on insight and curiosity about someone as fascinating as Sheela that it seems like a criminal waste of an opportunity." Saibal Chatterjee said that the film is "an extended, circuitous version of a Koffee With Karan episode that ferrets out nothing of import."

Writing for Hindustan Times, Rohan Naahar opined that the documentary is a "Dharma-style, surface-level profile of Ma Anand Sheela" that "brushes aside everything that is interesting about her in favour of fluff." Nandini Ramnath of Scroll.in wrote: "Unfolding mostly as a very long out-take from Wild Wild Country, the puff piece seeks to project [Sheela] as an enigma and a survivor [..] but the film actually comes across as an attempt to follow an entertaining yarn all the way to its last, fraying thread."
