= Homebound (2025 film) =

Indian film by Neeraj Ghaywan

- Theatrical release poster
- Directed by: Neeraj Ghaywan
- Screenplay by: Neeraj Ghaywan; Sumit Roy
- Dialogues by: Neeraj Ghaywan; Varun Grover; Shreedhar Dubey
- Story by: Basharat Peer; Neeraj Ghaywan; Sumit Roy
- Based on: A Friendship, a Pandemic and a Death Beside the Highway by Basharat Peer
- Produced by: Karan Johar; Adar Poonawalla; Apoorva Mehta; Somen Mishra
- Starring: Ishaan Khatter; Vishal Jethwa; Janhvi Kapoor
- Cinematography: Pratik Shah
- Edited by: Nitin Baid
- Music by: Naren Chandravarkar; Benedict Taylor; Amit Trivedi
- Production companies: Dharma Productions; Toscan du Plantier
- Distributed by: Dharma Productions
- Release dates: 21 May 2025 (Cannes); 26 September 2025 (India)
- Running time: 122 minutes
- Country: India
- Language: Hindi
- Box office: est. ₹3 crore

Homebound is a 2025 Indian Hindi-language drama film directed by Neeraj Ghaywan, co-written by Ghaywan and Sumit Roy, based on a New York Times article by Basharat Peer from 2020. It explores the life of childhood friends Shoaib (Ishaan Khatter) and Chandan (Vishal Jethwa) while they attempt to pass the Indian Police Service exam. It also stars Janhvi Kapoor, Harshika Parmar, Shalini Vatsa and Chandan K Anand.

The film had its world premiere in the Un Certain Regard section of the 2025 Cannes Film Festival on 21 May, where it reportedly received a 9-minute standing ovation. It was theatrically released in India on 26 September to critical acclaim. The movie turned out to be a massive box-office disaster, making less than ₹5 crore, compiled on a budget of over ₹25 crore, despite highly positive critical reviews.

It was selected as the Indian submission for Best International Feature Film at the 98th Academy Awards, making into the December shortlist, but it was not nominated.

== Plot ==
Shoaib (an Indian Muslim) and Chandan (a dalit) are childhood friends from a small village in North India who dream of becoming police officers, hoping that the job will bring them the respect they never had. However, as they come closer to their goal, pressure and struggles causes friction in their friendship. Encouraged by Sudha, Chandan’s love interest, Chandan finds himself enrolled at college. Meanwhile, Shoaib struggles to support his family, following his father’s knee injury.

However, the appointments for joining the police force are delayed and eventually stalled. Without work and struggling to support their families, the two men find work in a textile mill in Surat, Gujarat.

However, their plans to help their families are cut short due to the nationwide lockdowns following the COVID-19 pandemic, which strands millions of migrant workers without work or transport back to their villages. Desperate, Chandan and Shoaib join the grueling journey over hundreds of kilometers back to their village. The two men take an overcrowded bus, but are kicked off because Chandan contracts a high fever and delirium. With no other choice, they are forced to walk the rest of the journey. In a devastating turn, Chandan dies from dehydration exhaustion.

This story is based on a true story about two migrant workers, Mohammad Saiyub and Amrit Kumar.

== Cast ==
- Ishaan Khatter as Mohammed Shoaib Ali
- Vishal Jethwa as Chandan Kumar Valmiki
- Janhvi Kapoor as Sudha Bharti
- Harshika Parmar as Vaishali, Chandan's sister
- Shalini Vatsa as Phool, Chandan's mother
- Chandan K Anand as Haroon Nawaz
- Vijay Vikram Singh as Shoaib's boss
- Yogendra Vikram Singh as Arjun Mishra
- Pankaj Dubey as Hassan Ali, Shoaib's father
- Shreedhar Dubey as Vikas Tripathi
- Dadhi R Pandey as Awdesh Kumar, Chandan's father
- Sudipta Saxena as Shoaib's mother
- Kuldeep Raghuvanshi
- Aamir Aziz as Ghanshyam

== Production ==
The film's original story was inspired by The New York Times 2020 essay Taking Amrit Home (now retitled A Friendship, a Pandemic and a Death Beside the Highway) by Kashmiri journalist Basharat Peer. It recounts the story of two young migrant workers in Surat, who were caught in the COVID-19 lockdown in March 2020.

During the pandemic, the story caught the eye of director Neeraj Ghaywan, after it was recommended by producer Somen Mishra at Dharma Productions. This is Ghaywan's second feature after his debut, Masaan (2015), which received widespread acclaim. Subsequently, Dharma Productions bought the rights from The New York Times and script development started, wherein the backstories of both protagonists were fictionalised, while keeping the essence of the original. French producer Mélita Toscan du Plantier brought in Martin Scorsese on board as executive producer. Scorsese also helped Ghaywan in crafting the screenplay and later during the editing process, watching three different cuts of the film. The film was shot in 2024 mainly in and around Bhopal in Madhya Pradesh state.

Produced by Dharma Productions, Martin Scorsese serves an executive producer.

== Release ==
Homebound premiered on 21 May 2025 at the 78th Cannes Film Festival in France. It closed Melbourne International Film Festival in August 2025. The film was also selected at the 2025 Toronto International Film Festival in Gala Presentation and was screened on 10 September 2025.

The Central Board of Film Certification (CBFC) reportedly asked Ghaywan to make 11 modifications, thereby censoring 1 minute and 17 seconds of the film's footage. Certain words were muted and replaced at 6 places, including 'gyan'. The makers were also asked to delete the dialogue 'Aloo gobhi... khaate hai'. Further, a two-second visual of a man performing puja were censored. The Revising Committee also made changes in a dialogue in an important cricket match scene at 1 hour and 4 minutes, deleting 32 seconds from the sequence. The series of cuts asked by the country's film certification board sparked debated around, what many called CBFC's 'arbitrary and whimsical' approach to how films are certified.

In an interview with Zoom, Ishaan shared his perspective on censorship in Indian cinema.

"Different films are often treated with different standards. Some receive leniency despite questionable content, while others—especially social films with a particular perspective—face more scrutiny, as artists and audiences, we'd appreciate an equal and open-minded approach where every story is treated fairly."

The film was released in theatres on 26 September 2025.

== Reception ==
=== Critical response ===
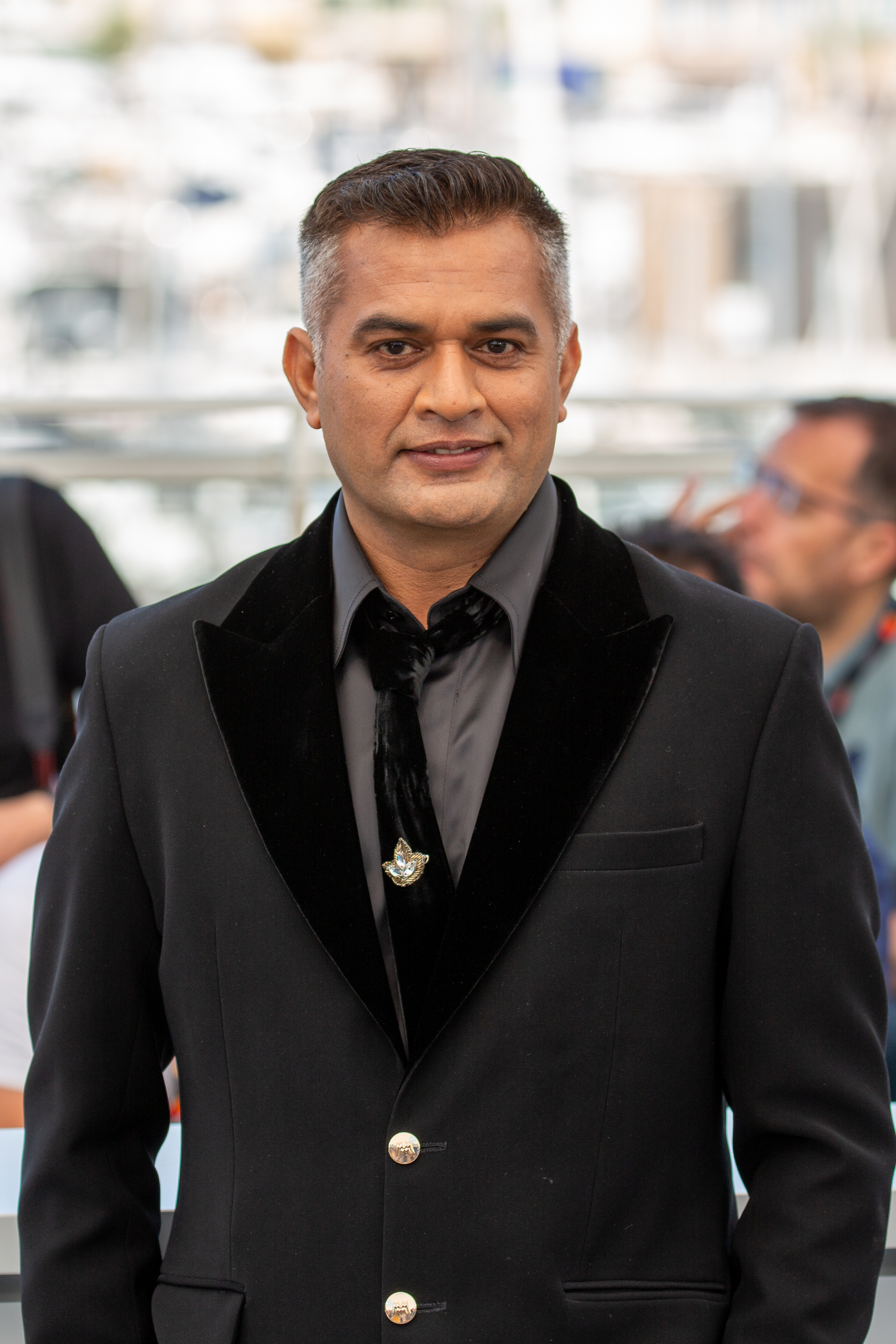
Neeraj Ghaywan at 2025 Cannes premiere. Ghaywan was praised for his direction, with many hailing him as one of the best directors working in the Indian cinema right now.

Homebound received universal critical acclaim from the critics, who praised Ghaywan's direction, the writing and the dialogues, performances, the themes and the editing. The film's handling of caste-narrative and social commentary also received praise. On the review aggregator website Rotten Tomatoes, 97% of 31 critics' reviews are positive, with an average rating of 7.8/10. Metacritic, which uses a weighted average, assigned the film a score of 85 out of 100, based on 6 critics, indicating "universal acclaim".

Namrata Joshi of Cinema Express gave 4 out of 5 stars and wrote "There is an authenticity to Homebound that goes beyond the writing and the language. It's in the realness of the spaces."

Leslie Felperin, reviewing for The Guardian, described the film as "an emotionally rich study of friendship" with "excellent lead performances, strong cinematography," and praised the director for creating "a realist work about impoverished young men from a rural northern Indian town" that is "neither dumbed down nor sanitised for westerners."

Writing for Variety, Siddhant Adlakha called Homebound — "the first time in ages that a mainstream Hindi-language production has felt vital - at least since Ghaywan's own Masaan," and described it as "a moving character piece, as well as a searing indictment of modern India." He also praised Khatter and Jethwa's performances as "immensely endearing and unpredictable." Shrishti Negi of News18 India concurred, citing Variety's praise of the duo's performances.

Writing for The Hindu, Anuj Kumar described the film as "a deeply immersive and emotionally resonant cinematic experience, that is both specific to the pandemic and universal in its tone and tenor," and concluded by calling it "a significant document of our times when social trust seems to be in a long-term decline."

Santanu Das of Hindustan Times said "Neeraj Ghaywan film hailed as 'deeply empathetic' with particular praise for Ishaan Khatter".

Anupama Chopra of The Hollywood Reporter India wrote Homebound is A Stunning Portrait of Systemic Cruelty and Defiant Courage

Aseem Chhabra, writing for BBC Culture, highlighted the film's exploration of caste and religious identities and noted that its depiction of marginalized communities resonated strongly with festival audiences.

Renuka Vyavahare, writing for The Times of India, gave the movie 5 out of 5 stars and wrote, "Homebound raises many questions. How did we get here? What has made us so bereft of empathy and compassion? A soul-stirring observation of a world growing cold, this is filmmaking at its finest."

Shubhra Gupta of The Indian Express gave 3.5 stars out of 5 and said that "Neeraj Ghaywan's second feature in a decade may or may not bring an Oscar home, but what it offers is compassion and cautious optimism, something we so desperately need in these times. Subhash K Jha writing for News 24 gave 5 stars out of 5 and stated that "I have seldom seen a film where not a single frame can be removed without seriously damaging the end product. This is it." Deepa Gahlot of Rediff.com rated it 4/5 stars and commented that "The film is deeply moving and the director's view of social reality is profoundly compassionate." Anna MM Vetticad writing for The Economic Times said in her concluding remarks that "Homebound is shorn of Amar Akbar Anthony-style melodrama and overt messaging that once characterised Hindi film portrayals of communal harmony. Shoaib and Chandan's devotion to each other speaks for itself, serving as an urgent reminder of the amity that survives among us against all odds."

=== Accolades ===
In December 2025, Homebound was one of 15 films shortlisted for the 98th Academy Awards for Best International Feature Film award.

Award	Date of ceremony	Category	Recipient(s)	Result	Ref.
Cannes Film Festival	24 May 2025	Un Certain Regard Award	Neeraj Ghaywan	Nominated	
Toronto International Film Festival	14 September 2025	International People's Choice Award	Homebound	2nd Runner-up	
Warsaw Film Festival	10 October 2025	Polish Film Institute Award (Audience Award)	Homebound	Winner	
Indian Film Festival of Melbourne	16 August 2025	Best Director & Best Film	Neeraj Ghaywan	Winner	
Zurich Film Festival	25 September 2025	Best International Feature Film	Homebound	Nominated	

== Controversy ==
In December 2025, author and journalist Puja Changoiwala alleged plagiarism, saying that the producers of Homebound plagiarized her 2021 novel Homebound. She said that they "have not only misappropriated the title of my book, but have also blatantly reproduced substantial portions of my novel in the second half of the film—including its scenes, dialogue, narrative structure, sequence of events, and other creative expressions." She subsequently initiated legal proceedings.

Dharma Productions denied these claims stating: "The allegations of copyright infringement are unfounded, and Dharma categorically denies the same. A legal notice has been received and duly responded to by Dharma's legal counsel. Homebound is an officially licensed adaptation inspired by The New York Times article by Basharat Peer, with all requisite rights lawfully acquired and due credit duly provided."

Screenwriter Sumit Roy, who co-authored Homebound's screenplay said that he was neither familiar with the author who made the allegations against the film, nor with her novel, and that the claims are "unfounded." With regard to the title of the screenplay, Roy said that they "debated many titles before settling on Homebound. Roy also said that his screenplay was influenced by Bengali filmmaker Satyajit Ray, commenting that "everything I said about Ray and how his humanism influenced Homebound remains as valuable as ever."

== See also ==
- List of submissions to the 98th Academy Awards for Best International Feature Film
- List of Indian submissions for the Academy Award for Best International Feature Film
