= Gyaarah Gyaarah =

Indian Hindi-language web-series

- Based on: Signal by Kim Eun-hee
- Written by: Puja Banerji; Sunjoy Shekhar; Sameer Saral Sharma; Gautam Govind Sharma
- Directed by: Umesh Bist
- Starring: Kritika Kamra; Raghav Juyal; Dhairya Karwa; Aakash Dixit; Mukti Mohan
- Country of origin: India
- Original language: Hindi
- No. of episodes: 8

Production
- Producers: Karan Johar; Apoorva Mehta; Guneet Monga; Achin Jain
- Cinematography: Kuldeep Manmania
- Production companies: Sikhya Entertainment; Dharma Productions

Original release
- Network: ZEE5
- Release: 9 August 2024 – present

Related
- Signal (2016)

Gyaarah Gyaarah is a 2024 Indian Hindi-language fantasy thriller series directed by Umesh Bist. The show is an adaptation of the Korean drama Signal (2016). Produced by Sikhya Entertainment and Dharma Productions, the series stars Kritika Kamra, Raghav Juyal, Dhairya Karwa, Nitesh Pandey and Aakash Dixit in lead roles.This marks the final performance of Nitesh Pandey in a web series after his death in 2023

The plot revolves around a unique twist of time-travel and communication across timelines to solve mysteries. It follows the interconnected stories of characters who attempt to unravel long-buried secrets through a magical radio that connects the past and the future.

Gyaarah Gyaarah premiered on ZEE5 on 9 August 2024.

== Plot ==
Additional information needed

Gyaarah Gyaarah is an investigative thriller that is set across a timeline of three decades – 1990, 2001 and 2016. It blends mystery and science with a degree of mysticism. The story is set in Uttarakhand, where Yug Arya, a police inspector in 2016 receives a mysterious transmission from Shaurya Anthwal dating back in 1990, 1998 and 2001 through an old walkie-talkie. The different timelines get connected only for a minute at exactly 11:11 pm. Together, Yug and Shaurya try to solve different cases in their timelines.

=== Episode 1 ===
Set in the Dussehra fair of Uttarakhand, the episode begins from 2002 where Yug Arya and Aditi Tiwari meet for the first time. Yug, being arrogant, did not befriend her even though she tries to. Later, a mysterious lady takes Aditi along with her, which Yug sees from behind. A few days later, her dead body is found from the barrage of the Ganga river.

The story then shifts 15 years later, in 2016, where her mother (Sanjana Tiwari) continues to protest for getting justice for her daughter. It is known that cases, including criminal ones, older than 15 years are soon to be permanently closed under a new law that has been passed.

Yug, who has now grown up to become a police inspector, is now posted in the police station where Aditi's case is registered. When everyone in the police department wants to ignore and close the case, Yug tries to find clues through her case file.

There is a flashback in the meantime in 2001 when Shaurya Anthwal was investigating the kidnapping of Aditi. Young Yug sees on TV that Aditi has been kidnapped by a medical college student named Raghav Nautiyal and reaches the police station to tell them that the kidnapper is a lady and not a man. He manages to write it on a chit and give it to Shaurya. The news of Aditi's dead body to be found reaches the Police.

Shaurya is angry with himself of being incapable to find the murderer and sees a note stuck on a monitor in his cabin. The note read "3 November Panchachuli Textile Mill". Post mortem report says that she was suffocated to death and Alkylphenol Ethoxylate was also found from her body, which is found in detergents.

Shaurya investigates in his own way after his seniors get angry on him. He reaches a drug peddler and finds out that it was Raghav's girlfriend who had contacted him at Panchachuli Textile Mills. He then himself visits the Mill at night, which is sealed by the Government. He enters the mill and finds the dead body of Raghav Nautiyal.

In present (2016), Yug goes through Aditi's file and sees the autopsy report. He finds Alkylphenol Ethoxylate and browses for its uses. The lights suddenly began flickering to a complete blackout. At exactly 11:11 pm, both the timelines get connected. Shaurya starts to call out Yug's name and he is surprised from the mysterious sound coming from the store room. He discovers that the sound was coming from a walkie-talkie. Shaurya then tells that he has found Raghav's body near the Dyeing Shed at Panchachuli Textile Mill, which Yug had told him. Yug does not understand anything and Shaurya is hit by someone and the transmission is cut. Yug gets to know that the walkie-talkie was 15 years old and did not have any batteries too. Now, he goes to the mill to find out something, thinking that Shaurya is someone in the present. He finds the skeletal remains of someone and runs outside.

== Cast ==
- Kritika Kamra as ACP Vamika Rawat /Sub inspector Vamika rawat
- Raghav Juyal as Inspector Yug Arya
- Dhairya Karwa as Shaurya Anthwal
- Gautami Kapoor as Sanjana Tiwari
- Tapasvi Joshi as Raghav Nautiyal
- Samvedna Suwalka as Ritu Bhatt
- Harsh Chhaya as Sameer Bhatiya
- Gaurav Sharma as Rajendra Juyal
- Nitesh Pandey as Sub Inspector Balwant Singh
- Preshah Bharti as Deepali Seth
- Aakash Dixit as a Sub Inspector
- Mukti Mohan as Palak Rana
- Sachin Kumar as Birju
- Brijendra Kala as Brahmdutt Chandola
- Gandhali Jain as Dilshan Khan
- Anshika Jain as Mala Joshi (Conductor)
- Purnendu Bhattacharya as Harbhajan Anthwal
- Ambuj Anand as Babloo Barood
- Paritosh Sand as D. K. Sultania
- Rohit Pathak as Shamshera
- Khushi Bhardwaj as Garima
- Neha Singh as Shyamali Sultania

== Production ==
Gyaarah Gyaarah was first announced in May 2023 when Variety published a report on Oscar-winning producer Guneet Monga’s upcoming venture. Shortly after, a teaser was released, and it was confirmed that the show would be a remake of the popular Korean series Signal (2016). This TV show has been shot in the scenic beauties of Uttarakhand. Many scenes have been shot at the Oak Grove School located in Jharipani, Mussoorie. The school has Gothic architecture with buildings as old as 1888. The vintage of the school building have been utilised to give a jail like impact in many scenes. This adaptation marks the fourth official remake of the Korean show, following the Japanese, the Chinese and the Thai versions.

== Release ==
Gyaarah Gyaarah became available for streaming on ZEE5 from 9 August 2024.

== Reception ==
In her review for Scroll.in, Deepa Gahlot gave Gyaarah Gyaarah a positive review, noting that "every episode ends with a hook that demands a binge watch." The Hindustan Times echoed this sentiment, calling the show "immensely watchable." Filmfare praised the adaptation, highlighting Umesh Bist's direction and writing as "top notch," commending the skillful adaptation from the Korean original Signal. Meanwhile, Rediff observed that the show has enough entertaining elements to keep viewers hooked, especially those unfamiliar with the original Korean series.

However, some critics offered less favorable reviews. The Hindu remarked that the show "steadily loses steam" after a promising start. Shubhra Gupta of The Indian Express rated it 2 out of 5 stars, criticizing the series for failing to generate enough fear or tension, despite a few strong sequences.
