= Sumit Roy =

Indian screenwriter, writer, Director

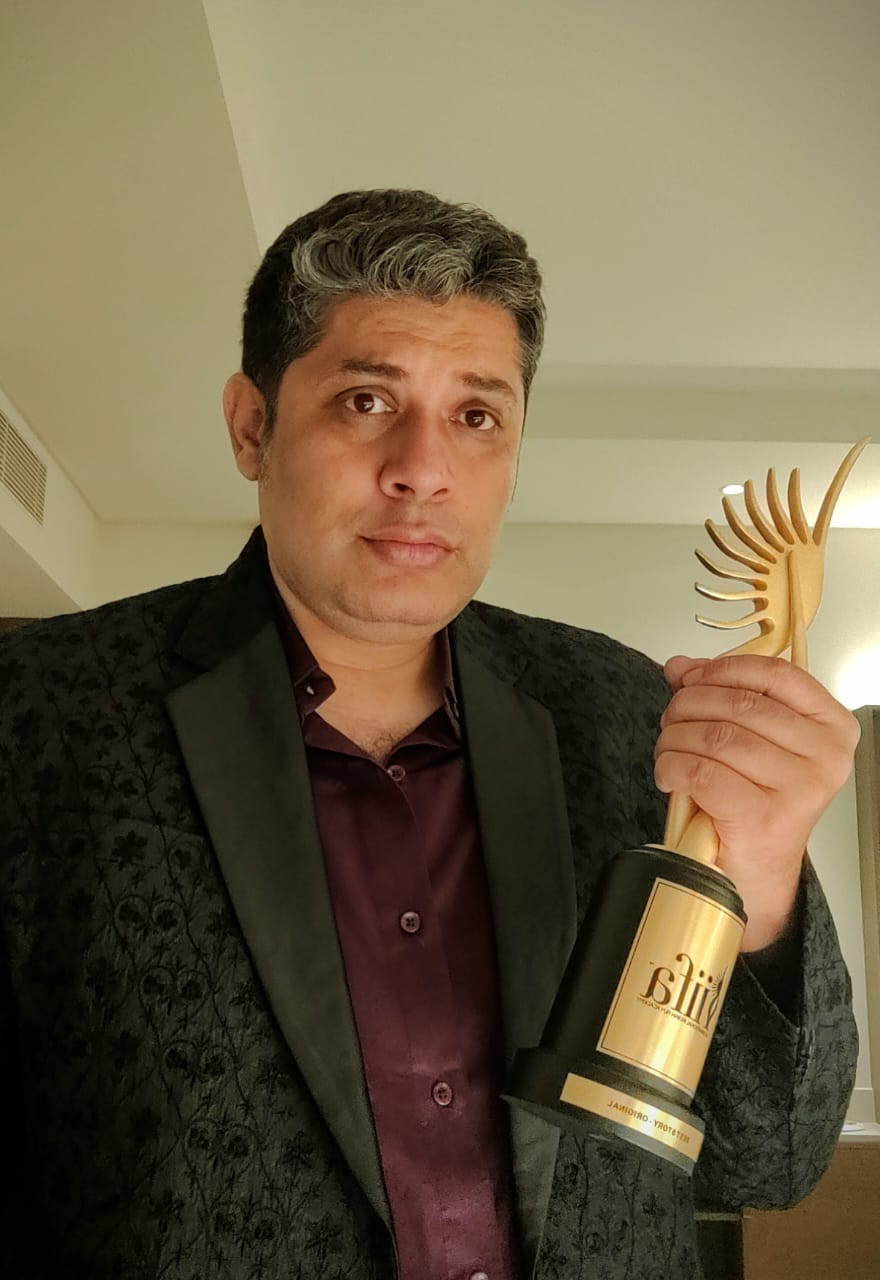
- Born: Delhi, India
- Education: St. Stephen's College; A.J.K. Mass Communication Research Centre
- Occupations: screenwriter; Director

Sumit Roy is an Indian screenwriter and director who primarily works in Hindi films. Sumit has written scripts for Bollywood productions such as Rocky Aur Rani ki Prem Kahani(2023), Gehrraiyaan (2022)., and Homebound (2025)

Sumit received two nominations at the 69th Filmfare Awards for Best Story and Best Screenplay for his work on Rocky Aur Rani ki Prem Kahani and also won IIFA for best story for his film Rocky Aur Rani Ki Prem Kahani.

== Career ==
His short film Dancing Queen (2007) won the first prize at the Sardinia International Ethnographic Film Festival (2008). It was also selected as India’s nominee for the Pangea Day global simulcast in 2008

Moving to Mumbai to pursue a career in Hindi feature films, Sumit was selected as one of the finalists of SANKALAN, India’s first script lab mentored by Anurag Kashyap, Sriram Raghvan and Anjum Rajabali.

In 2019 he wrote Takht for Karan Johar (Dharma Productions), an epic historical set in the Mughal era which is to star Ranveer Singh, Vicky Kaushal, Anila Kapoor, Kareena Kapoor, Bhumi Pedenkar, Jhanvi Kapoor.

In 2023, Sumit created and wrote Showtime (Indian TV series), an original drama about the inside working of Bollywood.

Sumit co-wrote Homebound, directed by Neeraj Ghaywan, which premiered in the Un Certain Regard section at the Cannes Film Festival, 2025. Executive-produced by Martin Scorsese, the film also featured at the Toronto International Film Festival (TIFF), winning the second runner-up prize in the International People’s Choice Award. Homebound was also selected as India’s official entry for the Best International Feature Film category at the 98th Academy Awards.

== Filmography ==
Year	Film	Story	Screenplay	Dialogue	Note
2015	Zubaan	Yes	Yes	Yes	
2022	Gehraiyaan		Yes		
2023	Rocky Aur Rani Kii Prem Kahaani	Yes	Yes		
2025	Homebound	Yes			

== Web Series ==
Year	Film	Story	Screenplay	Dialogue	Note
2024	Showtime (Indian TV series)	Yes	Yes		

== Awards and nominations ==
Award	Year	Work	Category	Result	Ref.
International Indian Film Academy Awards	2024	Rocky Aur Rani Kii Prem Kahaani	Best Original Story	Won	
Filmfare Awards	2024	Rocky Aur Rani Kii Prem Kahaani	Best Story	Nominated	
Filmfare Awards	2024	Rocky Aur Rani Kii Prem Kahaani	Best Screenplay	Nominated	
Chetak Screen Awards 2026	2026	Homebound	Best Film Writing (Story & Screenplay)	Won	
Indian National Cine Academy (INCA)	2026	Homebound	Best Story & Screenplay	Won	
