= Shakun Batra =

Indian film director and screenwriter

- Born: 1 January 1983 (age 43); New Delhi, India
- Occupations: Film director, Writer and Actor

Shakun Batra (born 1 January 1983) is an Indian filmmaker, actor and writer. His first film was the romantic comedy Ek Main Aur Ekk Tu (2012). He followed this with the ensemble family drama Kapoor & Sons (2016) and the Amazon Prime Video original noir romantic drama Gehraiyaan (2022), also his production debut.

== Career ==
Batra entered the film industry working as a side actor in the film Don: The Chase Begins Again (2006), and then moved on to become an assistant director on films like Jaane Tu... Ya Jaane Na (2008) and Rock On!! (2008), while starring in the former as Nilesh, a minor character.

He made his debut as a writer and director with the offbeat romantic comedy Ek Main Aur Ekk Tu (2012). Rachel Saltz of The New York Times commented, "The happy surprise of Ek Main Aur Ekk Tu is that it's not crude, sniggering or vindictive. Instead it's rather sweet and sometimes even a little unexpected." Batra also directed the sketch parody video, "Genius of The Year", for the creative agency All India Bakchod, starring actress Alia Bhatt, which was released on YouTube.

Batra's next film was the ensemble family drama Kapoor & Sons (2016). Writing for The Hindu, Namrata Joshi said that the film "keeps you riveted as you move from one family fight to another" and praised Batra for giving "a refreshing new voice to an old, tried and tested trope."

Batra's next was a noir romantic drama that revolves around two couples, starring Deepika Padukone, Siddhant Chaturvedi, Ananya Panday and Dhairya Karwa. The film, also his production debut, was expected to go on floors in March 2020. Titled Gehraiyaan, it was initially slated to premiere directly on Amazon Prime Video on 25 January 2021, but was ultimately pushed to release on the platform on 11 February 2022.

Apart from this, he has also directed the docu-drama Searching for Sheela, which is based on Ma Anand Sheela and features her in the lead. All of his films till date have been produced by Karan Johar under Dharma Productions.

== Filmography ==
Year	Film	Director	Writer	Producer	Actor	Notes
2008	Jaane Tu Ya Jaane Na	No	No	No	Yes	
2012	Ek Main Aur Ekk Tu	Yes	Yes	No	No	
2012	Strangers In The Night	Yes	Yes	No	No	Short film
2016	Kapoor & Sons	Yes	Yes	No	No	
2021	Searching for Sheela	Yes	Creator	Executive	No	Documentary
2022	Gehraiyaan	Yes	Yes	Yes	No	Amazon Prime Video film
2026	Lust Stories 3	Yes	Yes	No	No	Netflix film

== Awards and nominations ==
Year	Award	Film	Category	Result	Ref.
2017	Filmfare Awards	Kapoor & Sons	Best Director	Nominated	
2017	Filmfare Awards	Kapoor & Sons	Best Story	Won	
2017	Filmfare Awards	Kapoor & Sons	Best Screenplay	Won	
2016	Indian Film Festival of Melbourne	Kapoor & Sons	People's Choice Award	Won	
2017	IIFA Awards	Kapoor & Sons	Best Story	Won	
2013	Screen Awards	Ek Main Aur Ekk Tu	Most Promising Debut Director	Nominated	
2017	Screen Awards	Kapoor & Sons	Best Director	Nominated	
2017	Stardust Awards	Kapoor & Sons	Best Story	Won	
2013	Zee Cine Awards	Ek Main Aur Ekk Tu	Most Promising Director	Nominated	
2017	Zee Cine Awards	Kapoor & Sons	Best Story	Won	
