= Dhairya Karwa =

Indian actor (born 1990)

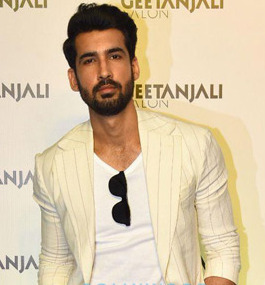
- Karwa in 2022
- Born: 19 November 1990 (age 35); Jaipur, Rajasthan
- Education: Shri Ram College of Commerce, University of Delhi
- Occupation: Actor
- Years active: 2019–present

Dhairya Karwa (born 19 November 1990) is an Indian actor who works in Hindi films. He made his acting debut with Uri: The Surgical Strike (2019), and has since played Ravi Shastri in 83 (2021) and an aspiring writer in Gehraiyaan (2022). Karwa has since starred in the thriller series Gyaarah Gyaarah (2024).

== Early life ==
Karwa was born on 19 November 1992 in Jaipur, Rajasthan. Karwa studied at Welham Boys’ School in Dehradun, where he was the school team’s Basketball captain and at Shri Ram College of Commerce, University of Delhi. Karwa played basketball for his college, and represented the Uttarakhand State team. He worked as a data analyst in Gurugram, before becoming a model. He modeled for many brands like Star Movies and Kerala Tourism.

== Career ==
Karwa made his acting debut in 2019 with Uri: The Surgical Strike. He portrayed Captain Sartaj Singh Chandhok. The film was a box office success grossing ₹359.73 crore. The same year, he made his web debut with Made in Heaven portraying Samar Ranawat.

He next appeared in the 2020 short film Amritsar Junction. He portrayed a rioter in the film based on 1947 communal riots during the Partition of India. In 2021, he appeared in Kabir Khan's sports film 83, where he portrayed cricketer Ravi Shastri. Despite the positive reviews, the film was unsuccessful at the Indian box office, it grossed ₹193.73 crore. Karwa received moderately positive reviews for his performance.

Karwa next portrayed an aspiring writer in Shakun Batra's Gehraiyaan, opposite Deepika Padukone. The film premiered on 11 February 2022 on Amazon Prime Video and received mixed-to-positive reviews from critics. Pinkvilla noted, "Dhairya Karwa makes his presence felt enough while sharing screen space with Deepika." While DNA India mentioned, "Karwa makes a solid impression by playing the ignorant partner."

He next appeared alongside Tara Sutaria in Apurva. Karwa has appeared in advertisements for Slice and Shoppers Stop.

== Filmography ==
=== Films ===
Key
†	Denotes films that have not yet been released

Year	Title	Role	Notes	Ref.
2019	Uri: The Surgical Strike	Captain Sartaj Singh Chandhok		
2020	Amritsar Junction	Rioter	Short film	
2021	83	Ravi Shastri		
2022	Gehraiyaan	Karan Arora		
2023	Apurva	Siddharth "Sid"		

=== Television ===
Year	Title	Role	Notes	Ref.
2019	Made in Heaven	Samar Ranawat	Episode: "A Royal Affair"	
2024	Gyaarah Gyaarah	Inspector/ ASI Shaurya Anthwal		
