= Benedict Taylor (musician) =

British musician

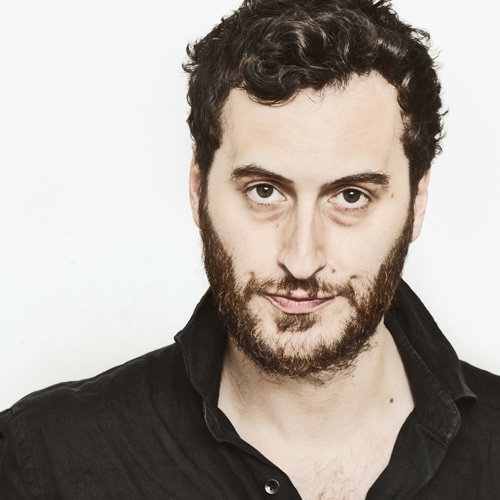
- Taylor in February 2016

Background information
- Genres: Improvisation; new music; avant garde; experimental music; film composition
- Occupations: Musician; violist; violinist; composer
- Instruments: Viola; Violin; Vocals
- Years active: 2000–present
- Spouse: Radhika Apte (m. 2012)

Benedict Taylor is a British avant-garde violist, violinist and composer.

== Career ==
Taylor works in contemporary composition, modern string performance and improvised music in the British and European new music world. The central focus of his work is in new composition for live performance, film, theatre, contemporary dance, art installation, and electroacoustic composition. In performance, he predominantly works within improvisation, new composition and 20th/21st century music.

Within his performance work there is a focus on solo performance as a creative and investigative process. In 2013 he initiated an ongoing commission series and solo label Subverten (For Viola Solo). The first works premiered in autumn 2013 and continue several times each year.

He has worked with a number of music organisations and ensembles including; clapTON Ensemble, re:sound, London Improvisers Orchestra, Berlin Improvisers Orchestra, Project Instrumental, Tokyo Improvisers Orchestra, Kammer Klang Players, Squib-Box, ARCO, London Sinfonietta Collective, Regular Music II.

Notable festival, venue and radio appearances include; Jazz en Nord Festival France, Tete a Tete Opera Festival, Aldeburgh Festival, Cantiere Internazionale d'Arte – Montepulciano, Huddersfield Contemporary Music Festival, Fete de la Musique Berlin, Manchester International Festival, Manchester Jazz Festival, Cheltenham Festival, BBC Radio 3, Resonance FM, Radio Libertaire/Epsilonia (Paris).

== Personal life ==
Taylor married Indian actress Radhika Apte in 2012. Their first child, a daughter, was born in 2024.

== Awards ==
- Royal Philharmonic Society – Sir John Barbirolli Award (solo viola)
- Lynn Foundation Scholarship (solo viola)
- Westmorland Music Society Grant (solo viola)
- Crystal Bear, Berlinale 2014 (Killa)
- International Jury Special Mention, Berlinale 2014 (Killa)
- Transylvania Trophy (Best Film) TIFF (Ship of Theseus)
- Jury Special Mention BFI London Film Festival (Ship of Theseus)
- London Film Critics Circle selection: Centenary Celebration – 15 life changing films (Ship of Theseus)
- Grand Jury Award – New York SAIFF (The Bright Day)

== Discography ==
=== Solo ===
- SWARM for solo strings
- Rend (ROAM Releases) solo violin
- Solstice (Nachtstück Records) Benedict Taylor solo viola
- Caged Guerrillas (Subverten) – score and album for viola and distorted viola by Benedict Taylor

- A Purposeless Play (Subverten) Benedict Taylor solo viola
- Pugilism (Subverten) Benedict Taylor solo viola
- Transit Check (CRAM) – Benedict Taylor, Solo Viola
- Alluere (Subverten) Benedict Taylor, Solo Viola
- Striations (Subverten) – Benedict Taylor, Solo Viola

=== Collaborations ===
- Landscapes – Paul Dunmall, Philip Gibbs, Benedict Taylor, Ashley John Long (FMR 2019)
- Close | Quarters (A New Wave of Jazz 2019) Benedict Taylor & Anton Mobin
- Rechtschaffen & Kales (ROAM 2019) Benedict Taylor, Tom Jackson, Chihiro Ono, Neil Luck
- Puncture Cycle (A New Wave of Jazz) Benedict Taylor & Dirk Serries
- Live at ZSenne Art Lab 11/10/18 (Roam) Tom Jackson & Benedict Taylor
- Prossime Trascendenze (Amirani Records)
- Miya / Benedict + 7 Maestros: Live at Shinjuku Pit Inn Tokyo 2017 (Suon Records)
- Alex Ward Item 10 – Volition (Live at Cafe Oto)
- In bed later, lying near the wall, his knees pulled up and his face resting on the striped ticking of the mattress, Leventhal went over his mistakes. (Roam) Tom Jackson & Benedict Taylor
- TONUS: Texture Point (New Wave of Jazz) Dirk Serries, Martina Verhoeven, Benedict Taylor
- Songs From Brightly-Lit Rooms (Squib Box) Tom Jackson & Benedict Taylor
- Hidden Bomba (Linear Obsessional) Chris Cundy & Benedict Taylor
- Four Quartets (Confront Recordings) Benedict Taylor, Tom Jackson, Keith Tippett, Ashley John Long
- Alexandertwatz in Berlin (Sardine Butty) Benedict Taylor & Stephen Crowe
- Hunt at the Brook (FMR) Benedict Taylor, Daniel Thompson & Tom Jackson
- Stow | Phasing (Raw Tonk) Benedict Taylor & Anton Mobin
- Gubbins – Benedict Taylor & Adam de la Cour
- Burn Before Listening – The Rejected Recordings of Benny Court & Benny Taylor (Squib Box)
- Songs from Badly-Lit Rooms (Squib Box) – Tom Jackson & Benedict Taylor
- Dark Voices (CRAM) – Lawrence Upton & Benedict Taylor
- Guests on Tape – Anton Mobin & Benedict Taylor
- Une Nuit De Bruit (Sombre Soniks) – Benedict Taylor, Anton Mobin, Adio Lawal-West, Andrew Page, P23, Tim Drage
- Compost (CRAM) – Daniel Thompson, Alex Ward, Benedict Taylor
- The Long Half Day (Slightly Off Kilter) – Carousel Collective & Thomas Mindhouse
- Last Wayne Days (Squib Box) – Neil Luck, Fiona Bevan & Arco
- Lio, Leo, Leon (Emanem) – London Improvisers Orchestra
- Singing Marram III & IV (Subverten) – Benedict Taylor Solo Viola. Graphic scores Lawrence Upton

== Composition ==
=== Solo ===
- Sleepwalkers (film score)
- In Response to – concept album part 2 – release 2020
- To Whom It May Concern – concept album part 1 – release 2020
- Ghost Stories
- Guerrillas in Boxes
- One Jewish Boy (Stephen Laughton. Old Red Lion Theatre)
- Guerrillas 2018 – Nonclassical October 2018
- Young Hot Bloods (Longsight Theatre)
- The Hungry (Bornila Chatterjee. Film London 2017)
- Caged Guerrillas – for soloist or small ensemble. Score and album premiere Phantom Gallery Chicago 2017
- Guerrillas 2016 – for soloist or small ensemble. Premiere – Nonclassical October 2016
- Oysters (Pratyusha Gupta 2016)
- Mr Incredible (Camilla Whitehall. Dir – Sarah Meadows)
- Where Do Little Birds Go (Camilla Whitehall. Dir – Sarah Meadows)
- YOU (Mark Wilson. Dir – Sarah Meadows) Duck Down Theatre Company
- Fireworks (Dalia Taha. Dir – Richard Twyman) Royal Court Theatre
- The Djinns of Eidgah (Abishek Majumdar. Dir – Richard Twyman) Royal Court Theatre
- The Bright Day (Mohit Takalkar)
- Maunraag (Vaibhav Abnave)
- Waves of Power (Rajesh Thind)
- Citizen Soldiers (Rajesh Thind)
- Our Stories: Living and Coping with Schizophrenia in India

=== Collaborations ===
- Udta Punjab (2016) – Background score with Naren Chandavarkar
- Ghoul – Music Benedict Taylor & Naren Chandavarkar
- Balekempa 'The Bangle Seller' – Music Benedict Taylor & Naren Chandavarkar
- Newton – Music Benedict Taylor & Naren Chandavarkar
- Gurgaon Music – Benedict Taylor & Naren Chandavarkar
- Killa Music – Benedict Taylor & Naren Chandavarkar
- Ship of Theseus Music – Benedict Taylor & Naren Chandavarkar
- Harud Music – Benedict Taylor, Naren Chandavarkar, Suhaas Abuja
- That Girl in Yellow Boots Music – Benedict Taylor, Naren Chandavarkar & Suhaas Ahuja
- Butoh (Maria Guerberof). Music – Benedict Taylor & Alison Blunt
- The Dead Can Dance (Typewriters Collective). Music – Benedict Taylor & Alison Blunt
- Laal Kaptaan Background Scores – Benedict Taylor & Naren Chandavarkar
- Chintu Ka Birthday
- Searching for Sheela
- Killer Soup – Music Benedict Taylor & Naren Chandavarkar
