= Shalini Vatsa =

Indian theatre and film actress

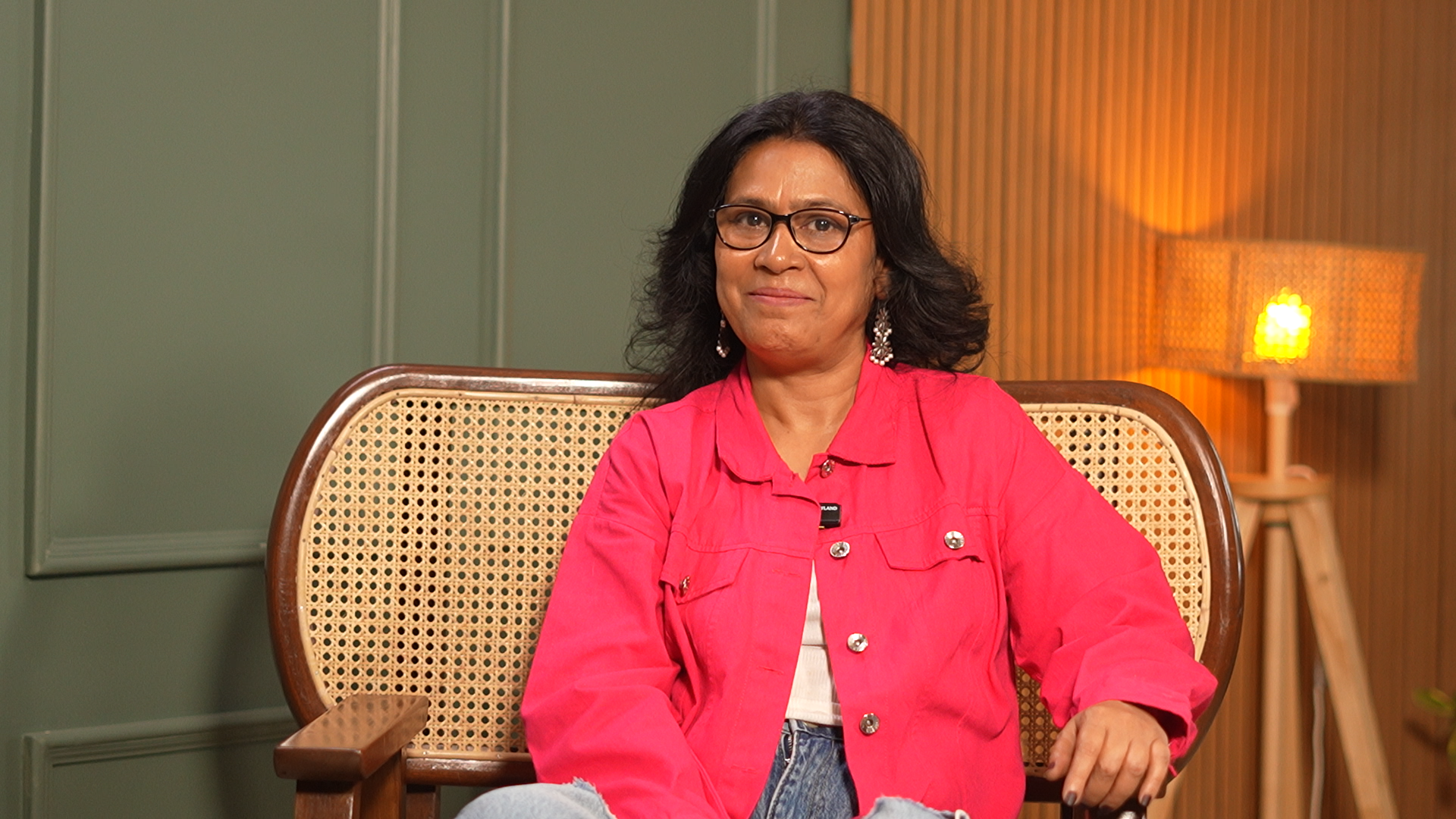
- Born: Patna, Bihar, India
- Occupation: Actress
- Years active: 2010–present
- Notable work: Peepli Live, Sacred Games, Ludo

Shalini Vatsa is an Indian theatre and film actress best known for her performances in the Netflix series Sacred Games (2018–2019) and films Peepli Live (2010), Ludo (2020) and Homebound (2025) . Active in Indian cinema since 2010, she has also worked across digital streaming series and independent cinema.

== Early life and education ==
Shalini Vatsa was born in Patna, Bihar, India. Both of her parents were professors at Patna University. She studied Political Science at Indraprastha College for Women, Delhi University and later completed an M.Phil. from Jawaharlal Nehru University (JNU), New Delhi.

Vatsa began performing in school plays and local theatre in Patna before moving to Delhi in 1990. She was later trained in theatre under Barry John and Habib Tanvir and was associated with Barry John's Theatre in Education (TIE) initiative and was part of Naya Theatre, the repertory company founded by Habib Tanvir.

== Career ==
=== Debut and early roles (2010–2015) ===
Shalini Vatsa made her film debut as Dhaniya in Peepli Live (2010), a satirical drama produced by Aamir Khan.

She went on to appear in several films, including Shanghai (2012), directed by Dibakar Banerjee, and Shahid (2012), directed by Hansal Mehta, in which she portrayed Prosecutor Tambe.

=== Streaming and ensemble work (2016–present) ===
In 2016, she appeared as part of the ensemble cast in Gurgaon, an independent noir thriller.

Vatsa gained wider recognition for her role as Kanta Bai in Netflix’s Sacred Games (2018–2019). In Ludo (2020), she played Nurse Lata Kutty, a character described by The Indian Express as "fun and quirky."

In 2025, she played Warden in the Amazon Prime series Khauf. Her latest work includes a supporting role in Homebound (2025), directed by Neeraj Ghaywan. The film premiered in the Un Certain Regard section at the 2025 Cannes Film Festival.

== Awards and nominations ==
List of awards and nominations
Year	Award	Category	Nominated Work	Result
2021	SPOTT Awards	Web Film Award: Performance in a Supporting Role – Female	Ludo	Won
2022	IIFA Awards	Best Supporting Actress	Ludo	Nominated
2026	Critics' Choice Awards, India	Best Supporting Actress	Homebound	Won
2026	Screen Awards	Screen Award for Best Supporting Actress	Homebound	Won

== Selected filmography ==
Year	Title	Role	Notes
2010	Peepli Live	Dhaniya	Film debut
2012	Shanghai	Gauri	
2013	Shahid	Prosecutor Tambe	
2016	Gurgaon	Karma Devi	
2018–2019	Sacred Games	Kanta Bai	Netflix series
2020	Ludo	Lata Kutty	Netflix film
2025	Khauf	Warden Gracie Dungdung	Amazon Prime series
2025	Homebound	Chandan's mother	Cannes premiere
