= Gehraiyaan =

2022 Indian film by Shakun Batra

- Official release poster
- Directed by: Shakun Batra
- Screenplay by: Shakun Batra; Ayesha Devitre; Sumit Roy; Yash Sahai
- Story by: Shakun Batra; Ayesha Devitre
- Produced by: Hiroo Yash Johar; Karan Johar; Shakun Batra; Apoorva Mehta
- Starring: Deepika Padukone; Siddhant Chaturvedi; Dhairya Karwa; Ananya Panday
- Cinematography: Kaushal Shah
- Edited by: Nitesh Bhatia
- Music by: Kabeer Kathpalia (OAFF); Savera Mehta
- Production companies: Dharma Productions; Viacom18 Studios; Jouska Films
- Distributed by: Amazon Prime Video
- Release date: 11 February 2022 (India)
- Running time: 148 minutes
- Country: India
- Language: Hindi

Gehraiyaan (transl. Depths) is a 2022 Indian Hindi-language romantic drama film directed by Shakun Batra and produced by Dharma Productions, Viacom18 Studios and Jouska Films. The film stars Deepika Padukone and Siddhant Chaturvedi in lead roles, with Ananya Panday, Dhairya Karwa, Rajat Kapoor and Naseeruddin Shah in supporting roles.

Gehraiyaan premiered on 11 February 2022 on Amazon Prime Video. The film received mixed reviews from critics, with praise for its soundtrack, cinematography, visual style and performances of the cast; however its story, screenplay and climax received criticism.

== Plot ==
Alisha "Al" Khanna, a 30-year-old yoga instructor is working on an app but struggling to find investors while providing for her boyfriend Karan Arora, an unemployed writer. She has anxiety, dealing with her mother Sonali's suicide as a child, and is estranged from her father Vinod, who she blames for her mom's depression. Alisha's cousin Tia is engaged to Zain Oberoi and invites the couple to their Alibaug beach house. Zain and Alisha bond due to their traumatic past. Alisha impulsively kisses him but regrets it. Alisha, Tia and Karan are childhood friends through their families. When Alisha discovers that Karan shared his draft with Tia but not her, even though she had been asking to read it for a long time, she is extremely hurt and begins an affair with Zain.

Zain gets his business to invest in Alisha's app. Karan proposes to Alisha in front of family and friends. She ends her affair with Zain to focus on a fresh start with Karan, only to break up. The breakup follows after her discovery that Karan's book had been rejected before he proposed, a fact he kept from her. Zain tells Alisha that he will end his relationship with Tia once he returns her dad's investment in his company. Zain's company provides Alisha with a new yoga studio and the two continue their passionate affair.

At Zain and Tia's anniversary party, Alisha reveals to Zain that she is pregnant. Zain's company is placed under investigation when one of his investors is charged with money laundering. After Tia finds Alisha's anxiety pills in Zain's jacket, she confronts him but he manages to hide the truth. Alisha's yoga studio is sealed by the investigating officers from Zain's company, and she confronts him; Zain's business partner, Jitesh, deduces the truth about Zain's affair with her. Tia agrees to mortgage the beach house in Alibaug to save the company, but Zain sells it instead, convinced he can buy it back within a year. At Alibaug, Tia accuses him of having an affair. When he shows her his phone, she feels guilty and signs the papers. Karan tells Alisha that Tia is helping Zain with his company. An angry Alisha gives Zain an ultimatum to reveal the truth to Tia, or she will.

Jitesh suggests to Zain that he can use drugs to get rid of Alisha's pregnancy. Zain calls Alisha to his yacht and lies that he ended things with Tia. Alisha sees him secretly mixing pills in her drink and is horrified. Zain attempts to push her overboard, but slips and hits his head, drowning in the sea as a result. A frightened Alisha rushes back home, where she has a miscarriage from PTSD.

Zain's body is found by police. Jitesh, who knew about Zain's plan, threatens Alisha to get him the signed papers of the beach house sale from Tia's house or he will tell everyone the truth about their affair. Alisha does so and Jitesh helps cover up Zain's death as a suicide. Tia reveals to Alisha that her father Kumud had an affair with Alisha's mom Sonali, and Alisha was born from their affair, making them half-siblings. Kumud left the beach house in Alisha's name in his will. Depressed, Alisha attempts to commit suicide, but is interrupted by her father. By not wanting to feel suffocated like her mother, Alisha realizes she has ended up exactly like her. She questions Vinod on why he never told her the truth about Sonali, letting her blame him, and her father comforts her by telling her that he did not want Sonali's life to be defined by that one mistake.

Two years later, Alisha now has a better relationship with her father and attends Karan's engagement party, where she meets Tia. Tia, still unaware of Zain and Alisha's affair, agrees to mend their relationship. Karan introduces them to his fiancée's grandmother, who recognises Alisha, recalling how Alisha and Zain had helped her and her husband from a stranded boat. Zain had introduced Alisha as his fiancée at that time. Alisha stares blankly at the woman, realizing that she cannot escape her past without confronting it.

== Cast ==
- Deepika Padukone as Alisha "Al" Khanna: Vinod and Sonali's daughter; Tia's cousin; Karan's girlfriend; Zain's lover
  - Ananya Anand as young Alisha
- Siddhant Chaturvedi as Zain Oberoi: Jitesh's friend and business partner; Kumud's former employee; Tia's boyfriend and later fiancé; Alisha's lover
- Ananya Panday as Tia "Ti" Khanna: Kumud and Vaani's daughter; Alisha's cousin; Zain's fiancée and girlfriend
  - Arzoo as young Tia
- Dhairya Karwa as Karan Arora: Raman and Neetu's son; Tia's friend; Alisha's boyfriend
- Rajat Kapoor as Jitesh: Zain's business partner and friend
- Naseeruddin Shah as Vinod Khanna: Kumud's elder brother; Sonali's former husband; Alisha's father
  - Imran Chappar as young Vinod
- Sahiil Sagar as Zain Oberoi's Office staff
- Vihaan Chaudhary as Bejoy Sen (Banker)
- Pavleen Gujral as Sonali Khanna: Vinod's late wife; Alisha's mother (died by suicide)
- Deepak Kripalani as Raman Arora: Neetu's husband; Karan's father
- Kanika Dang as Neetu Arora: Raman's wife; Karan's mother
- Natasha Rastogi as Vaani Khanna: Kumud's wife; Tia's mother
- Anup Sharma as Kumud Khanna: Vinod's brother; Vaani's husband; Tia's father
- Shataf Figar as Ranjeet
- Yamini Joshi as Sejal

== Production ==
=== Development ===
In April 2019, Shakun Batra was reported to direct the biopic on Osho, which was shelved. During the 21st edition of the MAMI film festival in October 2019, Batra was reported to direct Deepika Padukone in the lead, labelling the film's genre as domestic noir. In December 2019, Padukone went to the office of Dharma Productions and met Batra, where a script discussion about the film was held for a few minutes. Impressed by the narration, Padukone confirmed that she had a part in the film. In mid-December 2019, it was further reported that Vicky Kaushal and Siddhant Chaturvedi were reported to be playing the male leads, and another actress was reported to be on board for the project. The latter was finalized and, in the very same month, Ananya Panday was finalized as the second female lead. Dhairya Karwa was cast as Padukone's love interest in March 2020.

=== Filming ===
Pre-production of the film began in March 2020. Initially, filming was to proceed in Sri Lanka, however, amidst the COVID-19 pandemic and subsequent lockdown, the shoot was delayed by six months and moved to Goa, owing to its similar landscapes. The first schedule began in September 2020 and lasted approximately one month. The team returned to Mumbai in November 2020, where the filming resumed in December. Shooting for the next schedule commenced in Mumbai at the end of March 2021. Filming was wrapped up in August 2021. After being known as Production No. 70 for two years, a teaser was released on 20 December 2021, revealing the title of the film as Gehraiyaan.

The production had an "intimacy department" of intimacy coach Neha Vyas and intimacy coordinator Aastha Khanna led by intimacy director Dar Gai.

== Music ==
The film's music and original score is composed by independent musical duo Kabeer Kathpalia a.k.a. OAFF and Savera Mehta in their mainstream film debut. Kausar Munir and Ankur Tewari wrote the lyrics for the songs. The track featured in the announcement teaser of the film is the Hindi version of "Frontline" sung by Lothika Jha and the Hindi lyrics were written by Tewari.

== Reception ==
Gehraiyaan received mixed reviews from critics, with praise for its soundtrack, cinematography, visual style and performances of the cast; however its story, screenplay and climax received criticism.

On the review aggregator website Rotten Tomatoes, 64% of 22 critics' reviews are positive, with an average rating of 5.8/10.

Anna M. M. Vetticad of Firstpost gave the film a rating of 4/5 and wrote, "Gehraiyaan has an enigmatic air from its opening scene and gradually takes on an additional layer of unrelenting foreboding." Sanjana Jadhav of Pinkvilla gave the film a rating of 4 out of 5 and wrote, "Batra's Gehraiyaan is a deep dive into individual and family's past choices, relationships and why we do, what we do. The director has successfully struck a balance of intimacy, shock, grief and above all love." Renuka Vyavahare of The Times Of India gave the film 3.5 out of 5 and wrote, "Batra tries to decode complex human behaviour and its consequences, through a story that's tough to narrate." Umesh Punwani of Koimoi gave the film a rating of 3.5/5 and wrote, "All said and done, I don't remember when was the last time a film's title did so much justice to its story." Devesh Sharma of Filmfare gave the film a rating of 3.5/5 and wrote, "The film is shot quite beautifully by Kaushal Shah. A technically sound film having some fine performances and carrying a hint of mystery as well."

Roktim Rajpal of Deccan Herald rated the film 3.5/5 stars and wrote, "Gehraiyaan makes an impact due to the effective screenplay and natural performances." Simran Singh of DNA India rated the film 3.5/5 stars and wrote, "Although the plot of Gehraiyaan isn't novel, the treatment of the subject leaves an impression." Sukanya Verma of Rediff rated the film 3.5/5 stars and wrote, "Padukone embodies to perfection the Gehraiyaan in the title." Shilajit Mitra of The New Indian Express rated the film 3.5/5 stars and wrote, "As a narrative, Gehraiyaan goes commendably far for a mainstream Hindi film. But its words tend to trip up the ride." Taran Adarsh of Bollywood Hungama rated the film 3/5 stars and wrote, "Gehraiyaan is a mature relationship drama with niche appeal, bravura performances and an exciting climax." Phuong Le of The Guardian rated the film 3 out of 5 and said, "While the lurid twists and turns are enjoyable in a '90s erotic thriller kind of way, the sudden shift towards suspense doesn't hamper Padukone's performance. And what a performance it is!"

Shubhra Gupta of The Indian Express gave the film 2 out of 5 and wrote, "The foursome of Padukone-Chaturvedi-Panday-Karwa should have been a throbbing hot mess, but the film doesn't go deep enough." Saibal Chatterjee of NDTV gave the film 2 out of 5 and wrote, "The film is about youthful, adventurous love, but it is utterly devoid of humour and zing. When it tries to lighten up, it falls flat." Shantanu Ray Chaudhari of The Free Press Journal gave the film 1 out of 5 and wrote, "The writing veers between the trite and the ridiculous."

== Awards and nominations ==
Award (Note: Awards, festivals and organizations are in alphabetical order.)	Date of ceremony (Note: Date is linked to the article about the awards held that year, wherever possible.)	Category	Recipient(s)	Result	Ref.
Indian Film Festival of Melbourne	16 August 2022	Best Actress	Deepika Padukone	Nominated	
Indian Television Academy Awards	11 December 2022	Best Debutant Actress of the Year – OTT	Ananya Panday	Won	
Bollywood Film Journalist Awards	2023	Best Film	Gehraiyaan	Nominated	
Bollywood Film Journalist Awards	2023	Best Director	Shakun Batra	Nominated	
Bollywood Film Journalist Awards	2023	Best Actress	Deepika Padukone	Nominated	
Bollywood Film Journalist Awards	2023	Best Supporting Actor	Naseeruddin Shah	Nominated	
Bollywood Film Journalist Awards	2023	Best Supporting Actor	Siddhant Chaturvedi	Nominated	
Bollywood Film Journalist Awards	2023	Best Supporting Actress	Ananya Panday	Nominated	
FOI Online Awards	20 January 2023	Best Actress in a Leading Role	Deepika Padukone	Nominated	
FOI Online Awards	20 January 2023	Best Music Director	Oaff and Savera	Nominated	
FOI Online Awards	20 January 2023	Best Original Song	“Doobey”	Nominated	
News18 REEL Movie Awards	4 March 2023	Best Film on OTT (Hindi)	Gehraiyaan	Nominated	
News18 REEL Movie Awards	4 March 2023	Best Actress	Deepika Padukone	Nominated	
Hitlist OTT Awards	17 March 2023	Best Film	Gehraiyaan	Nominated	
Hitlist OTT Awards	17 March 2023	Best Actress	Deepika Padukone	Nominated	
Hitlist OTT Awards	17 March 2023	Best Supporting Actor	Naseeruddin Shah	Nominated	
Hitlist OTT Awards	17 March 2023	Best Supporting Actress	Ananya Panday	Nominated	
Zee Cine Awards	18 March 2023	Best Actor – Female	Deepika Padukone	Nominated	
Zee Cine Awards	18 March 2023	Best Actor (Critics) – Female	Deepika Padukone	Nominated	
Zee Cine Awards	18 March 2023	Best Actor in a Supporting Role – Female	Ananya Panday	Nominated	
Zee Cine Awards	18 March 2023	Song of the Year	“Doobey”	Nominated	
BollywoodLife Awards	24 March 2023	Best Film on OTT (Hindi)	Gehraiyaan	Won	
BollywoodLife Awards	24 March 2023	Best Actor – Hindi Film	Siddhant Chaturvedi	Nominated	
IIFA Awards	26–27 May 2023	Best Music Director	Oaff and Savera	Nominated	
IIFA Awards	26–27 May 2023	Best Lyricist	Ankur Tewari for “Gehraiyaan”	Nominated	
IIFA Awards	26–27 May 2023	Best Male Playback Singer	Mohit Chauhan for “Gehraiyaan (Reprise)”	Nominated	
IIFA Awards	26–27 May 2023	Best Female Playback Singer	Lothika Jha for “Doobey”	Nominated	
Nickelodeon Kids' Choice Awards India	27 June 2023	Favourite Bollywood Song	“Doobey"	Nominated	
