= Mismatched season 2 =

Mismatched
- Season 2
- Starring: Prajakta Koli; Rohit Saraf; Rannvijay Singha; Vidya Malvade
- No. of episodes: 8

Release
- Original network: Netflix
- Original release: 14 October 2022

Season chronology
- ← Previous; Season 1

The second season of the Indian Hindi-language coming-of-age romantic drama web series Mismatched was originally premiered on Netflix in 2020. The season was directed by Akarsh Khurana and produced by Ronnie Screwvala, featuring Prajakta Koli, Rohit Saraf, Vihaan Samat, Taaruk Raina, Muskkaan Jaferi, Devyani Shorey, Rannvijay Singh, and Vidya Malvade. It was released on 14 October 2022 to mixed reviews.

== Cast ==
- Prajakta Koli as Dimple Ahuja, Simple and Dheeraj’s daughter; Celina’s ex best friend; Harsh’s project partner and former love interest; Rishi’s girlfriend
- Rohit Saraf as Rishi Singh Shekhawat; Kalpana’s son, Randeep’s stepson; Sanskriti’s former love interest; Dimple’s boyfriend
- Vihaan Samat as Harsh Agarwal, Dimple's project partner and formerly love interest
- Rannvijay Singha as Professor Siddharth Sinha (Sid)
- Vidya Malvade as Zeenat Karim, Sid's love interest
- Sanjana Sarathy as Sanskriti, Rishi's former love interest
- Devyani Shorey as Namrata Bidasaria, Rishi's best friend
- Priya Banerjee as Ayesha Duggirala, Namrata's new love interest
- Taaruk Raina as Anmol Malhotra, Dimple's rival
- Muskkaan Jaferi as Celina Matthews, Dimple's ex bestfriend and Namrata's ex love interest
- Kritika Bharadwaj as Simran Malhotra, Anmol's cousin and Krish's ex-girlfriend
- Abhinav Sharma as Krish Katyal, Anmol's bestfriend and Simran's ex-boyfriend
- Ruturaj Shinde as Momo
- Lisha Bajaj as Hostel Warden
- Akarsh Khurana as Anmol's therapist
- Ahsaas Channa as Vinny, Anmol's new friend
- Dipannita Sharma as Nandini Nahata, Sid's ex-girlfriend and Dimple's career idol
- Ravin Makhija as Ashish Singh Shekhawat, Rishi's brother
- Suhasini Mulay as Rishi's Grandmother
- Aditi Govitrikar as Kalpana, Rishi's mother
- Jugal Hansraj as Rishi's father
- Kshitee Jog as Simple Ahuja, Dimple's mother
- Jatin Sial as Dheeraj Ahuja, Dimple's father
- Adhir Bhat as Mr. Bidasaria, Namrata's father
- Sarika Singh as Mrs. Bidasaria, Namrata's mother
- Digvijay Savant as Randeep, Rishi's stepfather
- Shaunak Ramesh as Ramaswamy
- Trishna Singh as Shahana
- Vaibhav Palhade as Samar
- Yash Buddhdev as Danish Tamang
- Chirag Pardesi as Ritik

== Episodes ==
No. overall	No. in season	Title	Directed by	Written by	Original release date
1	1	"When Dimple Met Rishi.. Again"	Akarsh Khurana, Nipun Dharmadhikari	Gazal Dhaliwal	14 October 2022
Dimple and Harsh seek credit for their app. Namrata faces the aftermath of her secret spreading, while Rishi tries to salvage their friendship.
2	2	"Girl in the Middle"	Akarsh Khurana, Nipun Avinash Dharmadhikari	Gazal Dhaliwal	14 October 2022
With Namrata and Rishi back on campus, Celina’s anxieties run high, while Dimple and Harsh’s closeness sparks jealousy.
3	3	"100 Reasons to Hate You"	Akarsh Khurana, Nipun Avinash Dharmadhikari	Gazal Dhaliwal	14 October 2022
Dimple’s search for the data leak’s source proves challenging. Zeenat offers Sid a home-cooked meal and Anmol makes a discovery that tests his trust.
4	4	"Heartech"	Akarsh Khurana, Nipun Avinash Dharmadhikari	Gazal Dhaliwal	14 October 2022
Sparks fly at the tech fest in Ajmer as new connections are forged and a dance competition turns heated.
5	5	"Altair and Vega"	Akarsh Khurana, Nipun Avinash Dharmadhikari	Gazal Dhaliwal	14 October 2022
Love and lust are in the air as a tech-free day on campus leads to new revelations. In therapy, Anmol grapples with the reason behind his anger.
6	6	"You’re The One"	Akarsh Khurana, Nipun Avinash Dharmadhikari	Gazal Dhaliwal	14 October 2022
As the wedding nears, family drama leaves Rishi anxious. Harsh weighs a major decision about his future, while Celina overcomes her fears.
7	7	"It’s Not a Non-Date"	Akarsh Khurana, Nipun Avinash Dharmadhikari	Gazal Dhaliwal	14 October 2022
Namrata contemplates her future as tensions run high at home. Serious consequences catch up with Celina and Anmol finds he isn’t alone.
8	8	"I Love You More"	Akarsh Khurana, Nipun Avinash Dharmadhikari	Gazal Dhaliwal	14 October 2022
A romantic date gets in the way of Dimple’s dream. While the farewell party brings remorse and resolution, Namrata takes a bold step.

== Production ==
=== Soundtrack ===
Mismatched

Soundtrack album by Jasleen Royal, Samar Grewal, Anurag Saikia, Nikhita Gandhi, Shashwat Singh, Imaaduddin Shah, Shwetang Shankar, Ritviz Srivastava, Tkdvaibhavjha and Jackey Mishra
- Released: 30 September 2022
- Recorded: 2022
- Genre: Soundtrack
- Language: Hindi
- Label: Netflix

The soundtrack album for Mismatched Season 2 was composed by an assortment of ten artists, which includes Jasleen Royal, Samar Grewal, Anurag Saikia, Nikhita Gandhi, Shashwat Singh, Imaaduddin Shah, Shwetang Shankar, Ritviz Srivastava, Tkdvaibhavjha and Jackey Mishra.

Track listing
No.	Title	Lyrics	Music	Singer(s)	Length
1.	"Love Is Love"	Anoushka Maskey, Cosmic Grooves	Anoushka Maskey, Cosmic Grooves	Anoushka Maskey, Cosmic Grooves	2:53
2.	"Musafir x Wanderer"	Abhishek Jingar, Mayank Parashar, Sridev Ramesh	Abhishek Jingar, Mayank Parashar, Sridev Ramesh	Yugm, Sridev Ramesh, Arohi	5:12
3.	"Mehmaan"	Raitila Rajasthan	Sickflip	Dayam Khan, Eklash Khan, Manjur Khan	2:50
4.	"Aise Kyun"	Anurag Saikia, Raj Shekhar	Anurag Saikia, Raj Shekhar	Rekha Bhardwaj, Anurag Saikia, Raj Shekhar	5:29
5.	"Pugaipadam"	Subhashini Ganesan	Subhashini Ganesan	Sublahshini	3:03
6.	"Jaanu Na"	Danish Sood	Danish Sood	Danish Sood	3:18
7.	"Pipni"	Anurag Saikia, Raj Shekhar	Anurag Saikia, Raj Shekhar	Anurag Saikia, Vivek Hariharan, Jonita Gandhi, Neha Karode, Raj Shekhar	3:07
8.	"Dimple"		Sickflip	Sickflip	2:33
9.	"Kho Gaye"	Taaruk Raina	Taaruk Raina	Taaruk Raina	3:17
Total length:					31:01

== Reviews ==
Shubham Kulkarni of Koimoi gave the series a rating of 2.5 out of 5 and stated, "I understand the audience of the show doesn’t watch it as critically, and the makers have catered to them. But that doesn’t mean nobody assesses a show that has the potential to be good. With a whole lot of flaws, Mismatched Season 2 manages to not sink but the future deserves more to sail."

Ronak Kotecha of the Times of India rated the season 3 out of 5, saying "The overall treatment of this season too remains quite breezy and superficial with issues that are relatable for the youth while some seem like clichéd stereotypical situations that have been exploited far too many times before." NDTV rated the season 3.6 out of 5. Poulomi Das of Firstpost rated the season 2 out of 5, saying "Rohit Saraf and Prajakta Koli’s Netflix rom-com series continues to be a wasted opportunity."
