= Sanyukta Kaza =

Indian film editor

Sanyukta Kaza is an Indian film editor best known for her work on Tumbbad, Bhediya, Paatal lok, Mismatched and Kohrra. Her films have won accolades at multiple film festivals such as Cannes, Venice, Sundance, Toronto, Sitges, Screamfest, Palm springs etc. She has a Masters in Fine Arts from Chapman university.

== Career ==
Sanyukta Kaza started editing films with Ship of Theseus. Her first feature film won the National Award for Best Film and was selected as one of the '15 life-changing films of all time’ chosen by the British Film Institute.

Her other works include Tumbbad, Sudip Sharma's Pataal lok, Amar Kaushik's Bhediya, Anand Tiwari's Bang Baajaa Baarat, Abhishek Chaubey's Madhyantar, Varun Grover's AIR, Avinash Arun's Three of Us, Deepti and Fahad's My Love: Six stories of Love and Anand Tiwari's Love Per Square Foot amongst much more.

== Filmography ==
=== Films, Documentaries & Series ===
| Year | Title | Director | Additional Notes |
|---|---|---|---|
| 2005 | Lunch on the Run | Simone Ahuja | Premiered on PBS - USA |
| 2009 | Indique | Simone Ahuja | Premiered on PBS - USA |
| 2013 | Ship Of Theseus | Anand Gandhi | National Film Award for Best Feature Film |
| 2015 | Train Chaar Baje Ki Hai | Antariskh Jain | Screened at MIFF Screened at MAMI Mumbai Film Festival |
| 2015 | Bang Baaja Baraat | Anand Tiwari | Produced by Yash Raj Films |
| 2017 | Wish | Cory Edwards | Animated |
| 2018 | Love Per Square Foot | Anand Tiwari | Released on Netflix |
| 2018 | Tumbbad | Rahi Anil Barve | Also credited as the Creative Producer Premiered at Venice Film Festival |
| 2020–present | Mismatched | Akarsh Khurana & Nipun Dharmadhikari | Released on Netflix |
| 2020–present | Pataal Lok | Sudip Sharma | Released on Amazon Prime Video Filmfare Award for Best Drama Series |
| 2021 | My Love | Deepti & Fahad | Released on Netflix - USA IDA Documentary Award for Best Episodic Series |
| 2022 | Jugaadistan | Akarsh Khurana & Adhaar Khurana | Released on Lionsgate Play |
| 2022 | Maja Ma | Anand Tiwari | Released on Amazon Prime Video |
| 2022 | Bhediya | Amar Kaushik | Zee Cine Award for Best Editing |
| 2023 | Kohrra | Randeep Jha | TV series on Netflix |
| 2023 | Three of Us | Avinash Arun | |
| 2024 | Killer Soup | Abhishek Chaubey | TV Series on Netflix |
| 2024 | All India Rank | Varun Grover | Premiere at IFFR |
| TBA | Pooja Meri Jaan | Navjot Gulati | Upcoming |
| TBA | Distant Teardrop | Padmakumar Narasimhamurthy | Upcoming |

=== Shorts ===
| Title | Director | Additional Notes |
|---|---|---|
| His Man Friday | Ammar Rasool | |
| Don't Touch It | Ammar Rasool | 1st Place Indie Gathering Award - Best Short Family Film |
| The Things You Lose | Amy Kernan | |
| Monocrome | Mark Powell | |
| Village of Joy | Bishal Nath | Produced by Films Division of India |
| Holi | Colston Julian | |
| The Thought of You | Ahmed Roy | Released on Large Short Films |
| The Knot | Avlokita Dutt | |
| Oye Teri | Anand Tiwari | |
| Eggolution | Rupesh Tillu | |
| Vishanu | Avinash Arun | As a part of Unpaused - Amazon Prime Video Anthology |
| Masterchef | Ritesh Batra | Premiered at the Sundance Film Festival Screening at event co-hosted by Bill and Melinda Gates Foundation |
| Sleepwalkers | Radhika Apte | Best Film at the Palm Springs International Film Festival |
| Chamki | Anand Gandhi | Won Bronze at Cannes Lions International Festival of Creativity |
| Madhyantar | Abhishek Chaubey | Released on Netflix |
| Lust Stories 2 (Segment : Mirror) | Konkona Sen Sharma | Released on Netflix |
| High Fun | Adesh Prasad | Upcoming |
| Island | Nicholas Kharkongor | Upcoming |
| 251 | Bauddhayan Mukherji | Upcoming |
| Draped in Silence | Charanpreet Singh | Upcoming |
