= When Dimple Met Rishi =

2017 novel by Sandhya Menon

- First edition
- Author: Sandhya Menon
- Language: English
- Genre: Romance; Drama
- Publisher: Hachette India (India); Hodder & Stoughton (UK); Indiebound (USA)
- Publication date: 30 May 2017
- Publication place: United States
- Media type: Print (paperback, hardback)
- Pages: 380
- ISBN: 9781481478687

When Dimple Met Rishi is a 2017 American young adult romance novel by Sandhya Menon. It tells the story of 18-year-old Indian American Dimple Shah who meets a boy named Rishi Patel at a web developing camp in San Francisco and the two fall in love. The novel was released on 30 May 2017 and became a best seller in The New York Times Best Seller list. It is also available as an audiobook narrated by Sneha Mathan and Vikas Adam at Audible. When Dimple Met Rishi was adapted into a Netflix series titled Mismatched, which released in 2020.

== Reception ==
When Dimple Met Rishi met with a positive response from critics. Lucinda Dyer of Common Sense Media said that the novel "portrays Dimple and Rishi's blended world of conservative Indian culture and tech nerds in a way that will be instantly relatable not only to readers who come from Indian families but also to any teens who've ever been misunderstood by their parents or felt like an outsider."

A review carried by Kirkus Reviews called it "Heartwarming, empathetic, and often hilarious—a delightful read." Another reviewer from The Times of India called it "an enjoyable read with a satisfying plot and ending." Christine Hepperman of Chicago Tribune wrote: "Sandhya Menon's effervescent debut novel respectfully depicts the tradition of arranged marriage while offering an inventive scenario for how it might play out within American teen life."

Nivea Serrao of Entertainment Weekly noted that the novel's "crowning achievement is the romance between its main characters as they each fall for one another at varying paces." A review by School Library Journal said, "The strength of the story comes from its blending of Indian culture and values into a modern-day romance that scores of readers can enjoy."

== Adaptation ==
When Dimple Met Rishi was adapted into a web series by Gazal Dhaliwal and directed by Akarsh Khurana and Nipun Dharmadhikari. It was titled Mismatched and starred Prajakta Koli and Rohit Saraf in lead roles. The series premiered on 20 November 2020 on Netflix.
