= Taaruk Raina =

Indian actor and musician

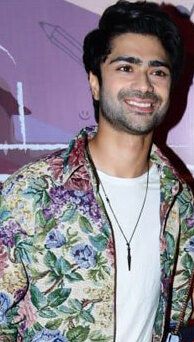
- Raina in 2023
- Occupations: Actor; Singer
- Years active: 2015–present
- Known for: Mismatched

Taaruk Raina is an Indian actor, singer, songwriter and composer. He is known for his portrayal of Anmol Malhotra in Mismatched.

== Early life ==
Raina has been singing since he was six years old. He grew up listening to a lot of rock music, rap, heavy metal, and ghazals, and used to sing in his school choir as well. Lacking technical knowledge about music, he began learning via YouTube. After some years, he started performing gigs at bars and weddings.

== Career ==
In 2015, Taaruk began working as Aditya Chopra's assistant at Yash Raj Films for Befikre.

He then performed in theatre plays, notably as the lead character in an Indian adaptation of Disney’s Aladdin, where he had to act in front of a live audience and sing iconic numbers.

In 2018, he made his film debut in High Jack as Parth. The following year, in 2019, he appeared in ZEE5's Dhumrapaan and Kaand.

In February 2020, he starred in MX Player's relationship-drama Pawan & Pooja as Pawan opposite Natasha Bharadwaj. In June 2020, he also featured in the short film Purple. Since November 2020, he has been portraying Anmol Malhotra in the Netflix teenage romantic drama Mismatched, where he acted as well as composed two songs for the show. He was next seen in Sony Music India's song "Sukoon", featuring himself opposite Aisha Ahmed.

In 2021, he appeared in the Netflix mini-series Aryan & Meera as Aryan opposite Zayn Marie Khan.

In 2022, he featured in two web shows, ZEE5's The Broken News, and Amazon Prime Video's Jugaadistan. In the same year, he also portrayed Rishi Kapoor's son Vinayak Sharma in Sharmaji Namkeen.

In January 2023, Raina released his first independent single, "Narazi". In May 2023, he was a part of Audible's podcast series called Desi Down Under, along with Adarsh Gourav and Prajakta Koli, directed by Mantra, where the story is set in Sydney about three 20-year-olds from Mangalore who go to Australia to learn surf-lifesaving skills at Coogee Beach.

In March 2025, he was seen playing advocate Kantilal Sahni in Ram Madhvani's historical drama The Waking of a Nation, a story about the Jallianwala Bagh massacre, on SonyLiv.

He will next be seen in Danish Renzu's musical drama Songs of Paradise.

== Filmography ==
=== Films ===
Year	Title	Role	Notes	Ref.
2015	Befikre	—N/a	Assistant director	
2018	High Jack	Parth		
2019	Dhumrapaan	Owen		
2019	Kaand	Unnamed	Teleplay	
2020	Purple	Neil	Short film	
2022	Sharmaji Namkeen	Vinayak "Vincy" Sharma		
2025	Songs of Paradise	Rumi		

=== Web series ===
Year	Title	Role	Ref.
2020	Pawan & Pooja	Pawan Srivastav	
2020–present	Mismatched	Anmol Malhotra	
2021	Aryan & Meera	Aryan Khanna	
2022	The Broken News	Anuj Saxena	
2022	Jugaadistan	Lucky Kohli	
2025	The Waking of a Nation	Kantilal Sahni	
2025	Rangeen	Sunny	
2026	Operation Safed Sagar	Sangy	

=== Dubbing ===
Year	Title	Role	Language	Ref.
2023	Desi Down Under	Rahul	English	

=== Music videos ===
Year	Title	Singer	Ref.
2025	"Raazdaariyan"	Sagar Bhatia	

== Discography ==
Year	Title	Film/Series	Co-singer	Music	Lyrics	Ref.
2018	"Happy Ending Song" (Version 1)	High Jack	Sumedha Karmahe	Rajat Tiwari	Akarsh Khurana	
2018	"Happy Ending Song" (Version 2)	High Jack	Manasi Mulherkar	Rajat Tiwari	Akarsh Khurana	
2020	"Sukoon"	Single	—N/a	Himself, Charan Singh Pathania, Bruno Gonçalves Mota	Himself, Charan Singh Pathania	
2020	"Main Chala"	Mismatched (season 1)	Chaitanya Sharma alias SlowCheeta	Himself	Shwetang Shankar	
2022	"Kho Gaye"	Mismatched (season 2)	—N/a	Himself		
2023	"Narazi"	Single	—N/a	Himself, Charan Singh Pathania		
2023	"Kaise Banu"	Single	—N/a	Himself, Charan Singh Pathania		
2023	"Kalleyan"	Single	Akasa Singh		Himself, Akasa Singh	
2024	"Lost and Found"	Single	—N/a	Himself, Charan Singh Pathania		
2024	"Majboor"	Single	—N/a	Himself		
