= Hichki (soundtrack) =

Hichki (Original Motion Picture Soundtrack)

Soundtrack album by Jasleen Royal
- Released: 19 February 2018
- Recorded: 2017–2018
- Studio: YRF Studios, Mumbai
- Genre: Feature film soundtrack
- Length: 20:31
- Language: Hindi
- Label: YRF Music

Jasleen Royal chronology
Fukrey Returns (2017)	Hichki (Original Motion Picture Soundtrack) (2018)	Veere Di Wedding (2018)

Hichki (Original Motion Picture Soundtrack) is the soundtrack album to the 2018 film of the same name directed by Siddharth P. Malhotra and produced by Aditya Chopra and Maneesh Sharma under Yash Raj Films, starring Rani Mukerji. The film's soundtrack featured seven songs composed by Jasleen Royal and lyrics written by Raj Shekhar, Jaideep Sahni, Neeraj Rajawat, Aditya Sharma and David Klyton. It was released by YRF Music on 19 February 2018.

== Development ==
Hichki's soundtrack featured seven songs composed by Jasleen Royal in her first film soundtrack as a sole composer. (Note: Jasleen's contributions for Baar Baar Dekho, Shivaay (both 2016), Phillauri and Fukrey Returns (both 2017) were part of multi-composer projects and Haraamkhor (2017), which was her sole credit as a composer had only one song.) She met Sharma at Yash Raj Studios in late-2016, when she was working on the final mix of Baar Baar Dekho (2016). Jasleen expressed her interest on composing as a sole singer and as Yash Raj Films rarely worked with a multi-composer album, Sharma decided to bring her onboard. In her initial involvement, she composed three songs but was expanded to seven as the script demanded for it. She took a year for composing the songs as she wanted to experiment with the music.

All the songs had a quirky feel that matched the film's tone and synced well with each scene. The song "Teri Dastaan" was composed on set. "Madamji Go Easy" was described as an "absurd song" and a situational number. She brought Dharavi-based rappers, David Klyton, Rhiya Jauhari Siddesh Jammi, Yogesh Kurme and Abhishek Kurme, to record vocals with Benny Dayal, Nigel Rajaratnam and Naina Kundu. Klyton performed the Tamil rap, Jammi and Yogesh performed additional vocals, while Abhishek performed cough beatboxing. Jasleen made use of dhol and tassa to bring a street music feel. The song is picturized on the school kids playing prank on Mukerji and had quirky lyrics which Jasleen admitted that she had to "travel back to school in my mind to crack this".

While composing the song "Oye Hichki", Jasleen used utensils, tubs and spoons as instruments to provide the sonic landscape for the song. She initially composed an instrumental track "Naina's Theme" for the film but could not compose the background score due to time constraints. This led to Hitesh Sonik composing the film score.

== Release ==
The album was released by Yash Raj Films' subsidiary YRF Music on 19 February 2018. Afterwards, the song "Oye Hichki" was released the same day, at the Maneckji Cooper High School in Juhu, the school where Mukerji studied. The video songs for "Madamji Go Easy" and "Khol De Par" were released on 6 and 7 March. "Phir Kya Hai Gham" was released on 14 March.

== Critical reception ==
The album received a mixed-to-positive reception. Devansh Sharma from Firstpost wrote that Royal has delivered a good performance by composing it with "due care and translates into seamless fun by the time it reaches the audience". Debarati S. Sen of The Times of India concluded that the album is "a fun, light and breezy album, that sounds promising and is worth a hear". In a review published by Scroll.in, Devarsi Ghosh wrote "Hichki’s album is not a game-changer but carries a fair share of promise. Royal has much to provide in the musical landscape of Hindi cinema, and Hichki should provide a strong kickstart to her career as a solo composer." Joginder Tuteja of Bollywood Hungama was ambivalent of the album, rating it two stars, and said that he expected Hichki to be a songless film.

The Indian Express' Suanshu Khurana believed many of its bits are repetitive, and added "Hichki is not the finest album around at this point [...] But one needs to give due credit to Royal for putting together seven very listenable tracks with intelligent orchestration, compared to albums that are delivering absolute cacophony. She is definitely going to be the one to watch out for." Vipin Nair of Music Aloud gave three out of five and wrote "While Jasleen Royal does need to do something about the repetitiveness in her songs, especially with her singing, Hichki is definitely a step up for the lady as a composer. And happy to see another soundtrack without any old song remixes, then again that is another hallmark of Yash Raj soundtracks."

== Track listing ==
Hichki (Original Motion Picture Soundtrack) track listing
No.	Title	Lyrics	Singer(s)	Length
1.	"Oye Hichki"	Jaideep Sahni	Harshdeep Kaur	2:34
2.	"Madamji Go Easy"	Raj Shekhar, David Klyton	Abhishek Kurme, Benny Dayal, David Klyton, Naina Kundu, Nigel Rajaratnam, Rhiya Jauhari Siddesh Jammi, Yogesh Kurme	2:47
3.	"Khol De Par"	Raj Shekhar	Arijit Singh	3:13
4.	"Teri Dastaan"	Neeraj Rajawat	Jasleen Royal	3:43
5.	"Phir Kya Hai Gham"	Aditya Sharma, Neeraj Rajawat	Shilpa Rao	2:59
6.	"Soul of Hichki"	Jaideep Sahni	Harshdeep Kaur	2:00
7.	"Naina's Theme" (Instrumental)			3:15
Total length:				20:31
