= Imad Shah =

Imad Shah may refer to:

- Imad Shahi dynasty, ruling dynasty of the 16th-century Berar Sultanate in southern India
- Imaad Shah, Indian actor and musician
