= Mismatched =

Indian coming-of-age series

- Poster
- Genre: Romantic comedy; Coming-of-age; Drama
- Based on: When Dimple Met Rishi by Sandhya Menon
- Written by: Gazal Dhaliwal
- Directed by: Akarsh Khurana; Nipun Dharmadhikari
- Starring: Prajakta Koli; Rohit Saraf; Rannvijay Singha; Vidya Malvade; Vihaan Samat; Taaruk Raina; Ahsaas Channa; Muskkaan Jaferi
- Composers: Songs: Jasleen Royal; Samar Grewal; Anurag Saikia; Prateek Kuhad; Shashwa; Taaruk Raina; Dee MC; Abhijay Negi; Hiphop Bhaiya; Background Score: Anurag Saikia
- Country of origin: India
- No. of seasons: 3
- No. of episodes: 22

Production
- Producer: Ronnie Screwvala
- Cinematography: Avinash Arun (season 1); Milind Jog (season 2); Sudip Sengupta (season 3)
- Editors: Sanyukta Kaza; Namrata Rao
- Running time: 35 minutes

Original release
- Network: Netflix
- Release: 20 November 2020 – present

Mismatched is an Indian Hindi-language coming-of-age romantic drama television series on Netflix, based on Sandhya Menon's 2017 novel When Dimple Met Rishi. It was adapted by Gazal Dhaliwal and directed by Akarsh Khurana and Nipun Dharmadhikari. It is produced by Ronnie Screwvala's RSVP Movies. Starring Prajakta Koli, Rohit Saraf, Rannvijay Singha and Vidya Malvade in prominent roles, the series is about Rishi, a die-hard romantic who believes in traditional ways of dating, who falls for Dimple, a gamer, and eventually wants to marry her.

Dhaliwal adapted the novel in early 2018, with the script being tweaked for the series. While the novel is set in the United States, the story was adapted to take place in Jaipur. The series features cinematography handled by Avinash Arun and Milind Jog, with editing done by Sanyukta Kaza and Namrata Rao. Mismatched features a soundtrack album composed by Jasleen Royal, Samar Grewal, Anurag Saikia, Prateek Kuhad, Shashwat Singh, Taaruk Raina, Deepa Unnikrishnan, Abhijay Negi and Hiphop Bhaiya, with Saikia also composing background score for the series.

The series premiered on 20 November 2020, through the streaming platform Netflix. It received a positive response from audiences, with critics praising the chemistry of Saraf and Koli, the performances of the cast, music and background score. However, the writing and the direction was criticized.

The series was renewed for a second season on 3 March 2021. Season 2 premiered on Netflix on 14 October 2022. Season 3 premiered on Netflix on 13 December 2024. The series was renewed for a fourth and final season and is expected to release in 2026. This is the first Indian Netflix Original Series to reach four seasons.

== Cast ==
=== Main ===
Actor	Character	Description	Season
Rohit Saraf	Rishi Singh Shekhawat	Kalpana's son, Ashish's elder brother, Namrata's best friend and project partner, Sanskriti's former love interest, Dimple's love interest, NNIT's student	1-present
Prajakta Koli	Dimple Ahuja	Dheeraj and Simple's daughter, Celina's best friend, Harsh's project partner and former love interest, Rishi's love interest, LLIT's student	1-present
Rannvijay Singha	Professor Siddharth Sinha	Head of LLIT, Nandini’s ex-husband, Zeenat's second husband	1-present
Vidya Malvade	Zeenat Karim	Anmol's project partner, Sid's second wife	1-present
Taaruk Raina	Anmol Malhotra	Simran’s cousin, Krish’s bestfriend turned enemy, Zeenat's project partner, Vinny’s love interest, NNIT's student	1-present
Muskkaan Jaferi	Celina Matthews	Dimple's best friend, Krish’s project partner, Namrata’s former love interest, Rith’s love interest, NNIT'S student	1-present
Abhinav Sharma	Krish Katyal	Anmol's best friend turned enemy, Simran's ex-boyfriend, Celina's project partner, Celina’s casual boyfriend, Rith’s rival, NNIT'S student	1-present
Vihaan Samat	Harsh Agarwal	NRI, Dimple's project partner and former love interest	1-present
Kritika Bharadwaj	Simran Malhotra	Anmol's cousin, Krish's ex-girlfriend, Momo's project partner	1-2
Devyani Shorey	Namrata Bidasaria	Rishi's childhood best friend and project partner, Celina’s former love interest, Ayesha’s girlfriend	1-present
Ahsaas Channa	Vinny	Anmol's love interest	2-present
Dipannita Sharma	Nandini Nahata	Head of NNIT, Sid's ex-wife and rival, Dimple's career idol	2-present
Lauren Robinson	Rithika "Rith" Joshi	LLIT student, Celina’s love-interest, Krish’s rival	3-present
Garima Yajnik	Anuradha Ray	LLIT's student, Aalif’s love-interest	3-present
Akshat Singh	Aalif Ansari	LLIT student, Anuradha’s love-interest	3-present

=== Others ===
- Ruturaj Shinde as Momo

Simran’s project partner

- Ravin Makhija as Ashish Singh Shekhawat

Kalpana's younger son, Rishi's younger brother

- Suhasini Mulay

Rishi and Ashish's Grandmother

- Aditi Govitrikar as Kalpana

Rishi and Ashish's mother, Randeep's wife

- Digvijay Savant as Randeep

Kalpana's second husband, Rishi and Ashish's stepfather

- Jugal Hansraj as Mr. Shekhawat

Kalpana's ex-husband, Rishi and Ashish's father

- Jatin Sial as Dheeraj Ahuja

Simple's husband, Dimple's father

- Kshitee Jog as Simple Ahuja

Dheeraj's wife, Dimple's mother

- Adhir Bhat as Mr. Bidasaria

Namrata's father

- Sarika Singh as Mrs. Bidasaria

Namrata's mother

- Lisha Bajaj

Hostel Warden

- Sanjana Sarathy as Sanskriti

Randeep's assistant, Rishi's former love interest

- Priya Banerjee as Ayesha Duggirala

Namrata's girlfriend

- Anoushka Maskey as Phila Konglam

LLIT student

- Aathithya Chandramouli as Sai

Rishi’s colleague at NNIT

- Akarsh Khurana as Dr. Sumel Suri

Anmol's therapist

== Episodes ==
=== Series overview ===
Series	Episodes	Originally released
1	6	20 November 2020
2	8	14 October 2022
3	8	13 December 2024

=== Season 1 (2020) ===
No. overall	No. in season	Title	Directed by	Written by	Original release date
1	1	"When Dimple Met Rishi"	Akarsh Khurana, Nipun Avinash Dharmadhikari	Gazal Dhaliwal	20 November 2020
Hopeless romantic Rishi hopes to woo Dimple at a summer course after seeing her photo on a matrimonial website - but marriage is far from her mind.
2	2	"Hot Summer, Cold Vibes"	Akarsh Khurana, Nipun Avinash Dharmadhikari	Gazal Dhaliwal	20 November 2020
Dimple learns why she was really allowed to come to Jaipur. Bonding with Dimple during a class assignment, Rishi hopes they'll be paired for a project.
3	3	"Message Deleted"	Akarsh Khurana, Nipun Avinash Dharmadhikari	Gazal Dhaliwal	20 November 2020
After a less than fun dinner with Celina's friends Dimple's walk home with Rishi proves enlightening. Celina and Namrata both hide secrets.
4	4	"Making Moves"	Akarsh Khurana, Nipun Avinash Dharmadhikari	Gazal Dhaliwal	20 November 2020
Namrata confides in Rishi about her crush. Emotions run high when a wild house party at Zeenat's brings surprises and misunderstandings.
5	5	"It's Not A Date"	Akarsh Khurana, Nipun Avinash Dharmadhikari	Gazal Dhaliwal	20 November 2020
Rishi and Dimple go on a platonic date, but confessions and secrets raise the stakes. As Dimple's app idea is approved, Anmol poses a challenge.
6	6	"Games We Play"	Akarsh Khurana, Nipun Avinash Dharmadhikari	Gazal Dhaliwal	20 November 2020
Dimple devotes herself to her app before a dramatic gaming showdown with Anmol. Multiple betrayals risk relationships, including Dimple and Rishi's.

=== Season 2 (2022) ===
No. overall	No. in season	Title	Directed by	Written by	Original release date
7	1	"When Dimple Met Rishi.. Again"	Akarsh Khurana, Nipun Dharmadhikari	Gazal Dhaliwal	14 October 2022
Dimple and Harsh seek credit for their app. Namrata faces the aftermath of her secret spreading, while Rishi tries to salvage their friendship.
8	2	"Girl in the Middle"	Akarsh Khurana, Nipun Avinash Dharmadhikari	Gazal Dhaliwal	14 October 2022
With Namrata and Rishi back on campus, Celina's anxieties run high, while Dimple and Harsh's closeness sparks jealousy.
9	3	"100 Reasons to Hate You"	Akarsh Khurana, Nipun Avinash Dharmadhikari	Gazal Dhaliwal	14 October 2022
Dimple's search for the data leak's source proves challenging. Zeenat offers Sid a home-cooked meal and Anmol makes a discovery that tests his trust.
10	4	"Heartech"	Akarsh Khurana, Nipun Avinash Dharmadhikari	Gazal Dhaliwal	14 October 2022
Sparks fly at the tech fest in Ajmer as new connections are forged and a dance competition turns heated.
11	5	"Altair and Vega"	Akarsh Khurana, Nipun Avinash Dharmadhikari	Gazal Dhaliwal	14 October 2022
Love and lust are in the air as a tech-free day on campus leads to new revelations. In therapy, Anmol grapples with the reason behind his anger.
12	6	"You're The One"	Akarsh Khurana, Nipun Avinash Dharmadhikari	Gazal Dhaliwal	14 October 2022
As the wedding nears, family drama leaves Rishi anxious. Harsh weighs a major decision about his future, while Celina overcomes her fears.
13	7	"It's Not a Non-Date"	Akarsh Khurana, Nipun Avinash Dharmadhikari	Gazal Dhaliwal	14 October 2022
Namrata contemplates her future as tensions run high at home. Serious consequences catch up with Celina and Anmol finds he isn't alone.
14	8	"I Love You More"	Akarsh Khurana, Nipun Avinash Dharmadhikari	Gazal Dhaliwal	14 October 2022
A romantic date gets in the way of Dimple's dream. While the farewell party brings remorse and resolution, Namrata takes a bold step.

=== Season 3 (2024) ===
No. overall	No. in season	Title	Directed by	Written by	Original release date
15	1	"When Dimple Didn't Meet Rishi"	Akarsh Khurana, Nipun Avinash Dharmadhikari	Gazal Dhaliwal	13 December 2024
16	2	"For Better or For Verse"	Akarsh Khurana, Nipun Avinash Dharmadhikari	Gazal Dhaliwal	13 December 2024
17	3	"Chill vs Dil"	Akarsh Khurana, Nipun Avinash Dharmadhikari	Gazal Dhaliwal	13 December 2024
18	4	"It Gets Better, Hon"	Akarsh Khurana, Nipun Avinash Dharmadhikari	Gazal Dhaliwal	13 December 2024
19	5	"Where Does The Love Go?"	Akarsh Khurana, Nipun Avinash Dharmadhikari	Gazal Dhaliwal	13 December 2024
20	6	"Growing Pains"	Akarsh Khurana, Nipun Avinash Dharmadhikari	Gazal Dhaliwal	13 December 2024
21	7	"Hello, Future Wife!"	Akarsh Khurana, Nipun Avinash Dharmadhikari	Gazal Dhaliwal	13 December 2024
22	8	"Beginning, Middle and..."	Akarsh Khurana, Nipun Avinash Dharmadhikari	Gazal Dhaliwal	13 December 2024

== Production ==
=== Development ===
In late 2018, Netflix India and Ronnie Screwvala of RSVP Movies approached screenwriter Gazal Dhaliwal to adapt Sandhya Menon's 2017 novel When Dimple Met Rishi for Indian audiences. The original novel is about two Indo-American teenagers, Dimple and Rishi (the titular characters), whose parents are trying to arrange their marriage. Published by Hachette Book Group, it opened to good response from readers, and became a best selling novel, according to a report from New York Times. Netflix picked Akarsh Khurana (of Karwaan fame) and Nipun Avinash Dharmadhikari to direct the series.

Dhaliwal had already finished writing the script before Khurana was roped in to helm the series. Khurana approved of the new script as - 'it was a love-story between two real people with real issues'. He added, "Even though this was essentially a young adult romance, there was maturity in the way it was depicted. Dhaliwal, who counts Kuch Kuch Hota Hai as one of her guilty pleasures, was similarly drawn in by the simplicity of the high-school romance at the heart of the book, a contrast to the large-scale candyfloss high school universe depicted in Hindi films."

=== Casting ===
In a Firstpost interview, Dhaliawal stated about the casting and characters, syncing to the adaptation and the liberties while recalibrating the story to the Indian context. She added, "The story is about a setup which has gone horribly wrong. To make that happen, it was important to change the family dynamics. Akarsh and I felt very strongly about the fact that it wouldn't have been believable for Indian viewers if Rishi's parents were behind him to start looking out for girls when he's all of 18 so that he can get married in two years. So I introduced a grandmother in the mix (her character is not featured in the book), effectively using the older generation's adherence to tradition as justification for the arranged marriage setup. I also played around with Rishi's dynamics with his parents as well: In the book, Rishi's parents, who belong to a typical Gujarati family, are still together and Rishi is built to be more obedient than hopeless romantic."

=== Characters ===
Prajakta Koli and Rohit Saraf were cast in the series, marking the debut for the former. In an interview, Saraf stated, "The biggest selling point for him about the show was the 'romance' it has. The love, ambition, navigating through the college years of one's life and a kind of acceptance toward all that I going on in the life was something I found very relatable." Koli described her character Dimple, "She's very driven to achieve her goal; if she doesn't, her parents will get her married! Isn't that relatable to so many girls —and boys — across the country? I have so many cousins in my family who are dealing with this dilemma. That's why Dimple is so tough to crack; she doesn't let her guard down at all." Rannvijay Singha stated his character as being "cool and snarky on the outside but a softie inside, Professor Sid (himself) believes in tough love when it comes to his students". Speaking about his role, he further added that his character wants to push students out of their comfort zones so that they can each reach their highest potential.

=== Filming ===
While the book is set in the United States, the story was adapted to take place in Jaipur. About the setting, Khurana stated in an interview to Poulomi Das of Firstpost, that "When I initially read Gazal's take on the book, what I loved was that she altered the context for the love story at the centre of the proceedings and introduced a host of new characters who had very distinct characteristics which made the world building so much more interesting."

Shooting of the series took place in November 2019, with some portions being filmed Old Royal School of Jodhpur, and majority of the scenes were filmed in Jaipur. The shooting took place for 38–39 days, with the cast members shooting for 12 hours daily. The post-production was completed in May 2020 amid the COVID-19 pandemic lockdown in India.

== Soundtrack ==
Mismatched

Soundtrack album by Jasleen Royal, Samar Grewal, Anurag Saikia, Prateek Kuhad, Shashwat Singh, Taaruk Raina, Deepa Unnikrishnan, Abhijay Negi, Hiphop Bhaiya
- Released: 11 November 2020
- Recorded: 2020
- Genre: Soundtrack
- Length: 25:11
- Language: Hindi
- Label: Netflix
External audio
- Official Audio Jukebox on YouTube

The soundtrack album for Mismatched was composed by an assortment of nine artists, which includes Jasleen Royal, Samar Grewal, Anurag Saikia, Prateek Kuhad, Shashwat Singh, Taaruk Raina, Deepa Unnikrishnan, Abhijay Negi and Hiphop Bhaiya. Five of them also wrote lyrics for the songs, along with Nikhita Gandhi, Raj Shekhar, Shwetang Shankar, Ritviz. Anurag Saikia also scored the background music for the series. The soundtrack album, which released on 11 November 2020, features seven tracks upon the initial release, with an eighth song "Sun Toh" unveiled on 20 November as a bonus track.

Reviewing the soundtrack, Devarsi Ghosh of Scroll.in stated, "The Mismatched soundtrack is a couple of soft ballads along with some wacky cross-genre stuff, that doesn't make you disappoint."

Track listing
No.	Title	Lyrics	Music	Singer(s)	Length
1.	"Kahaan Ho Tum"	Prateek Kuhad	Prateek Kuhad	Prateek Kuhad	2:35
2.	"Jaana"	Jasleen Royal	Jasleen Royal	Jasleen Royal, Soundarya Jayachandran	2:49
3.	"Milne Ke Bahaana"	Imaad Shah, Samar Grewal	Samar Grewal	Imaad Shah, Samar Grewal	4:53
4.	"Dil Ke Baat"	Deepa Unnikrishnan, Hiphop Bhaiya	Deepa Unnikrishnan, Hiphop Bhaiya	Deepa Unnikrishnan	2:09
5.	"Aise Kyun"	Raj Shekhar	Anurag Saikia	Anurag Saikia, Raghav Chaitanya, Nikhita Gandhi, Rekha Bharadwaj	4:24
6.	"Main Chala"	Shwetang Shankar	Taaruk Raina	Taaruk Raina, SlowCheeta	2:59
7.	"Tabdeeli"	Nikita Gandhi	Shashwat Singh	Nikhita Gandhi	2:28
8.	"Sun Toh"	Ritviz	Abhijay Negi	Ritviz	2:54
Total length:					25:11

== Release ==
On 16 July 2020, Netflix announced the release of seventeen Indian originals, with Mismatched being one of them, scheduled for a release in late 2020. On 3 November 2020, the makers unveiled the first look posters through social media platforms and the official trailer was released on 6 November 2020. Ahead of its release, the makers conducted a virtual college fest event, through YouTube, in order to promote the series. The series premiered on Netflix on 20 November 2020.

The series was renewed for a second season on 3 March 2021. Season 2 premiered on Netflix on 14 October 2022. Season 3 premiered on Netflix on 13 December 2024. The series was renewed for a fourth and final season and is expected to release in 2026. This is the first Indian Netflix Original Series to reach four seasons.

== Reception ==
Poulomi Das of Firstpost stated, "There is a certain convenience to the storytelling... that makes teenage adolescence look like a statement, and not a stage of life." Antara Kashyap of News18 gave two-and-a-half out of five to the series and stated, "Mismatched is a show which should be watched for what it is, a light teenage drama to be binged on a weekend. There isn't a lot of depth in it, but it really isn't fair to expect it from the show in the first place." Raja Sen of Mint reviewed "There is a fair bit that doesn't — the final episode, evidently existing only to create emotionally high-strung cliff-hangers for the next season, is a massive letdown — but, on the whole, Mismatched has heart." Avinash Ramachandran of The New Indian Express stated, "Despite the missed opportunities and pulled-back punches, Mismatched does have its moments under the Jaipur sun."

Pallabi Dey Purkayastha of The Times of India, gave three out of five and stated, "The fresh pairing of Rohit Saraf and Prajakta Koli is a delight to watch on screen – the duo shares a crackling chemistry and sort of heightens the drama surrounding teenage bickering in an adorable way." Sanjana Jadhav of Pinkvilla stated, "Mismatched on Netflix creates a young, fun and drama-filled world of college students but with prospects of marriage looming that seems to be the biggest dampener."
