= Rangeen =

2025 Indian drama TV series

- Created by: Kabir Khan
- Written by: Amardeep Galsin; Amir Rizvi
- Directed by: Amardeep Galsin; Amir Rizvi
- Starring: Vineet Kumar Singh; Rajshri Deshpande; Taaruk Raina
- Country of origin: India
- Original language: Hindi
- No. of seasons: 1
- No. of episodes: 9

Production
- Executive producers: Kabir Khan; Rajan Kapoor; Amardeep Galsin; Amir Rizvi
- Production location: India
- Running time: 35–45 minutes
- Production companies: Kabir Khan Films Pvt. Ltd; Blue Magic Films

Original release
- Network: Amazon Prime Video
- Release: 25 July 2025

Rangeen is a 2025 Indian Hindi-language drama television series by Kabir Khan and Rajan Kapoor. Directed by Amardeep Galsin and Amir Rizvi, it stars Vineet Kumar Singh, Rajshri Deshpande and Taaruk Raina. The series was released as an Amazon Prime original on 25 July 2025.

== Premise ==
In the midst of a stagnant marriage, an upright middle-aged man's world is turned upside down when he discovers his wife's secret trysts with a paid lover. Desperate to reclaim his manhood, he plunges into the world of paid intimacy, hidden in plain-sight. Yet his unconventional path to revenge forces him to confront his fragile ego, biases, and desires. Along the way, a mix of eccentric characters and absurd situations sparks unexpected epiphanies. Rangeen is a humorous and poignant exploration of identity, manhood, morality and the true cost of getting what you want.

== Cast and characters ==
- Vineet Kumar Singh as Adarsh Johri
- Rajshri Deshpande as Naina Johri
- Taaruk Raina as Sunny
- Meghna Malik as Renu
- Sheeba Chaddha as Sitara
- Smita Bansal as Nikki
- Sanjeeta Bhattacharya as Lucky119
- Sana Khanna as Nikki
- Cyrus Sahukar as Jim
- Megha Burman as Jazz
- Ratnabali Bhattacharjee as Jugnu
- Priyanka Charan as Daya
- Chirag Katrecha as Vikki
- Preetika Chawla as Mahek

== Release ==
The series premiered on 25 July 2025 on Amazon Prime.

== Episodes ==
No.	Title	Directed by	Written by	Original release date
1	"Dimaag ke Keedey"	Kopal Naithani	Amardeep Galsin & Amir Rizvi	July 25, 2025
A seemingly upright newspaper editor's life goes awry when he discovers that his wife is sleeping with a paid lover. Feeling emasculated, he makes a radical decision.
2	"Sanki"	Pranjal Dua	Amardeep Galsin & Amir Rizvi	July 25, 2025
A raw confrontation with Naina drives Adarsh into a vengeful spiral, but he is out of his depth in an unfamiliar world. Naina doesn't know who to turn to, and Sunny finds himself stuck between the two.
3	"Cheenti"	Kopal Naithani & Pranjal Dua	Amardeep Galsin & Amir Rizvi	July 25, 2025
Adarsh pressures Sunny's agent Sitara to hire him. Sitara arranges a trial, during which he leaves a lasting impression. Naina feels unwelcome in her parents' house.
4	"Sooja Hua Mooh"	Pranjal Dua	Amardeep Galsin & Amir Rizvi	July 25, 2025
Adarsh is pursued by a young girl online. At a family function, Naina and Adarsh cross paths for the first time since their explosive argument. Meanwhile, Sunny spends time with Sitara's kids, and things get complicated.
5	"Magarmachh"	Kopal Naithani	Amardeep Galsin & Amir Rizvi	July 25, 2025
Adarsh replaces Sitara's blue-eyed boy Sunny and is paired with the volatile and capricious Jugnu. With Sitara out of his life, Sunny loses his sparkle.
6	"Daldal"	Kopal Naithani	Amardeep Galsin & Amir Rizvi	July 25, 2025
Adarsh moves up the ladder as he gets paired with the aristocratic Roshni, and Sunny sinks into a low as he accepts an uncomfortable arrangement. The boundaries of both gigolos are tested in different ways.
7	"Junglee Suar"	Kopal Naithani & Pranjal Dua	Amardeep Galsin & Amir Rizvi	July 25, 2025
Through Jugnu, Adarsh experiences the thrill of his new world, while through Roshni, he witnesses its desolation. Naina confronts her mother and resorts to desperation, while Sunny faces every gigolo's worst nightmare.
8	"I'm the Man"	Kopal Naithani	Amardeep Galsin & Amir Rizvi	July 25, 2025
Adarsh is hired by Renu as a stand-in fiancé, forcing a confrontation with his past. Sunny makes desperate attempts to reclaim his manhood while Naina must release herself from guilt before turning the page.
9	"Do Gadhey"	Pranjal Dua	Amardeep Galsin & Amir Rizvi	July 25, 2025
Adarsh and Naina realise the futility of their pursuits. Sunny makes an unexpected revelation, but Adarsh's actions land him in trouble.

== Music ==
Rangeen Songs
Title	Performer(s)	Lyricist(s)	Composer(s)	Notes
Bakra Rap	Taaruk Raina & Charan Singh Pathania	Taaruk Raina & Charan Singh Pathania	Taaruk Raina	Striking tonal contrast; blends rap and narrative to reflect the show’s dark comedy and emotional tension.
Khafa Toh Nahi	Suvarna Tiwari	Shubham Shirule	Shubham Shirule	Soft and introspective; explores guilt and emotional distance
Foolish Zindagi	Ajitesh Gupta	Raghav Dutt	Troy Arif	Bittersweet and whimsical; underscores the contradictions in the characters journeys and the ironies of modern life
Keeve Keeve	Mandy Gill, Shloke Lal	Shloke Lal	Shloke Lal	Reflects the need to let go of ego and self-righteousness; a gentle call to stop taking oneself so seriously and start truly living.
Suljhe Na	Shubham Shirule	Shubham Shirule	Sagar Desai	Mirrors the unresolved emotions at the heart of the characters' relationships.
Tumne Bhula Diya	Sagar Desai	Amir Rizvi	Sagar Desai	A quirky, postmodern riff on heartbreak and old Hindi love ballads.
Rangeen	Shubham Shirule	Shubham Shirule	Shubham Shirule	Celebrates the magic and “rangeen mijaaz” of someone who lights up the ordinary.

== Reception ==
The Free Press Journal wrote: “In an era where streaming often favours titillation over storytelling, Rangeen arrives with a scandalous premise — gigolos, infidelity, revenge — but swerves into unexpected territory… a soulful, slow-burn character study that flirts with scandal yet lands on emotional depth, restraint, and quiet, deeply human truths.”

OTTplay called Rangeen “a bold, bizarre, and brilliant midlife crisis,” praising the show for its originality and risk-taking, especially highlighting Vineet Kumar Singh’s performance: “Vineet Kumar Singh excels as Adarsh, and this is something that you have never seen him do ever.”

Rajshri Deshpande’s portrayal of Naina drew particular acclaim, with The Indian Express calling her arc “the most special part” of the series: “Naina refuses to apologise for her actions… A woman’s loneliness, in bed and out of it, is reason enough for her to seek succour outside of her marriage, and no one needs to judge her for it.” While Gupta and others noted that the series at times struggled with tonal cohesion and narrative sharpness, there was broad recognition of its willingness to provoke, challenge, and invite reflection.

Sheeba Chaddha was similarly praised for her role as Sitara, delivering “a quietly commanding performance… balancing warmth and shrewdness with ease.”

Rahul Desai for The Hollywood Reporter India remarked that while Rangeen “isn’t badly made,” its “reluctance to commit” at times undermined its impact, suggesting the series was “shy about the very repression it platforms.”

Reviewing for Scroll.in Nandini Ramnath wrote , "In its attitude towards sex work, the show is an improvement on Tribhuvan Mishra (about a debt-ridden chartered accountant) as well as B.A. Pass, Ajay Bahl's erotic thriller film from 2012.".

Vinamra Mathur of Firstpost wrote in her/his review, "Rangeen should have been a story about these two and how they reignite the extinguished flame of their decaying marriage. But it digresses more often than it should have." Shweta Keshri from India Today wrote "While the idea seemed quite intriguing and unique, 'Rangeen' soon loses its uniqueness and becomes just another bland show."
