= Paras Kuhad =

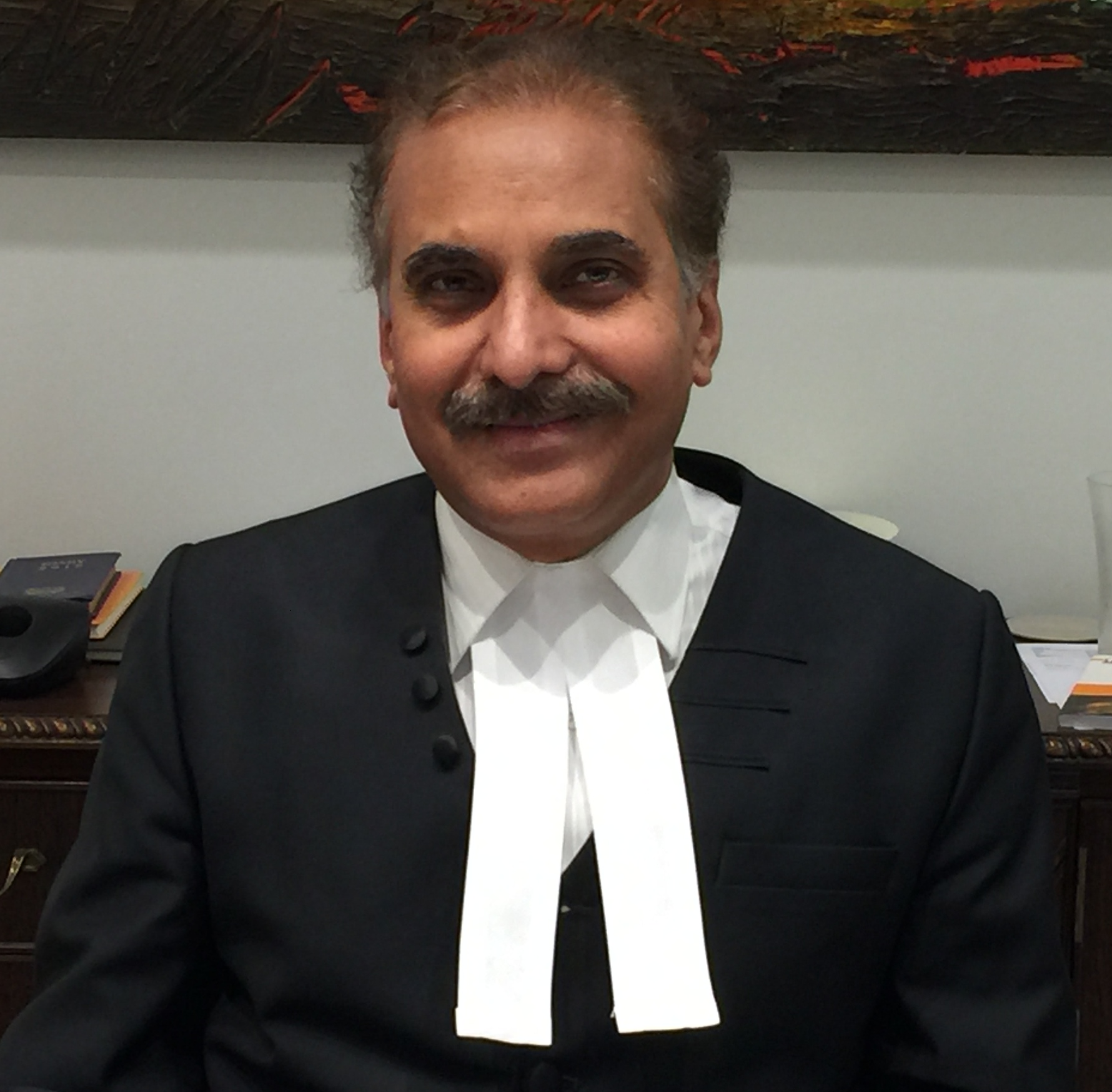
Paras Kuhad, Senior Advocate

Paras Kuhad is a Senior Advocate at the Supreme Court of India. In 2012, he was appointed as Additional Solicitor General of India, and worked as such till May 2014. He is also the father of famed singer Prateek Kuhad and the founder of Paras Kuhad & Associates law firm in 1989. Founder of Hemant Sahai Associates, Hemant Sahai once praised Paras as a wonderful professional and a human being
