= Supriya Shukla =

Indian actress (born 1975)

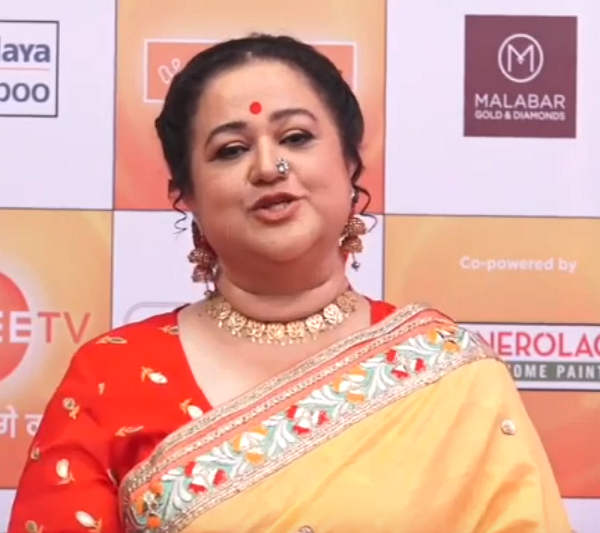
- Shukla in 2018
- Born: Supriya Raina; Delhi, India
- Other names: Supriya Raina Shukla & Supriya Shukla
- Occupation: Actress
- Years active: 2001–present
- Spouse: Haril Shukla (m.1994)
- Children: 2, including Jhanak Shukla

Supriya Shukla (née Raina) is an Indian television and film actress. She is known for her role as Sarla Arora in Zee TV's popular dramas Kundali Bhagya and Kumkum Bhagya. In 2023, she started portraying Shalini Kapoor in Bade Achhe Lagte Hain 3.

== Filmography ==
Key
†	Denotes films that have not yet been released

=== Films ===
Year	Title	Role	Language	Notes
2005	Parineeta	Sunita	Hindi	
2005	Salaam-e-Ishq: A Tribute to Love	Nurse	Hindi	Cameo
2006	Lage Raho Munna Bhai	Lucky Singh's wife	Hindi	
2009	3 Idiots	Matron	Hindi	Cameo
2010	Do Dooni Chaar	Urmi (Phupho)	Hindi	
2011	Mummy Punjabi	Bittu	Hindi	Cameo
2011	Bbuddah... Hoga Terra Baap	Aunty	Hindi	Cameo
2014	Main Tera Hero	Seenu's mother	Hindi	
2017	Shubh Mangal Savdhan	Mudit's mother	Hindi	
2018	Parey Hut Love	Unknown	Urdu	Cameo
2020	Doordarshan	Geetu	Hindi	
2022	Babli Bouncer	Ganga Tanwar	Hindi	
2025	Greater Kalesh	Sunita Handa	Hindi	
2025	Kis Kisko Pyaar Karoon 2	Mohan's Mother	Hindi	

=== Television ===
Year	Title	Role
2007	Woh Rehne Waali Mehlon Ki	Nirmala Sanjay Parashar
2007	Rakhi-Atot Rishtey Ki Dor	Kadambari
2009	Rehna Hai Teri Palkon Ki Chhaon Mein	Bubbly's Mother
2010–2011	Tere Liye	Laboni Bimlendu Banerjee
2011	Dharampatni	Saroj Galla
2011	Meri Maa	Unknown
2013	Sanskaar - Dharohar Apno Ki	Rameela Vaishnav
2014–2018	Kumkum Bhagya	Sarla Arora
2015	Saheb Biwi Aur Boss	Shanti Kumar
2017	The Kapil Sharma Show	
2017–2021	Kundali Bhagya	Sarla Arora
2019	Bahu Begum	Yasmin Qureshi
2019–2020	Naagin 4	Swara Mahesh Sharma
2020–2021	Molkki	Prakashi Devi
2022	Harphoul Mohini	Phoolmati Harvendra Choudhary
2023	Bade Achhe Lagte Hain 3	Shalini Kapoor
2024	Mera Balam Thanedaar	Sulakshana Singh
2025	Ufff..Yeh Love Hai Mushkil	Indrani
2026–present	Mannat – Har Khushi Paane Ki 2	Jolly Juneja

=== Special appearances ===
Year	Title	Role
2021	Bhagya Lakshmi	Sarla Arora
2022	The Kapil Sharma Show	Herself
2024	Suhaagan: Ke Rang Jashn Ke Rang	Sulakshana Singh

=== Web series ===
Year	Title	Role	Notes
2023	The Night Manager	Farzana Kidwai	2 seasons
2023	Half-Love Half-Arranged		2 seasons
2026	Tera Bann Chala Hoon	Aayu's mother	Youtube
