= Kamali from Nadukkaveri =

2021 Indian Tamil-language film

- Theatrical release poster
- Directed by: Rajasekar Duraisamy
- Written by: Rajasekar Duraisamy
- Starring: Anandhi; Rohit Saraf
- Cinematography: Jegadeesan Logayan
- Music by: Dheena Dhayalan
- Production company: Abbundu Studios
- Release date: 19 February 2021
- Running time: 159 minutes
- Country: India
- Language: Tamil

Kamali From Nadukkaveri is a 2021 Indian Tamil language coming-of-age film written and directed by Rajasekar Duraisamy in his directorial debut. The film stars Anandhi, Rohit Saraf (in his Tamil debut) and Pratap Pothen. It revolves around a carefree village girl who is smitten by an IIT Madras student and perseveres to join the same college to be near him.

The film was shot between July and November 2019, and had its theatrical release on 19 February 2021. It won the Tamil Nadu State Film Award for Best Film About Women Empowerment.

== Plot ==
Kamali Shanmugam is a mischievous, carefree girl from the village of Naducauvery, Tamil Nadu. Her father Shanmugam dismisses the importance of educating women, and sends Kamali to a Tamil medium school in the village while her brother attends a posh convent school. Kamali lacks ambition until she watches an interview with Ashwin, a 12th-grade student who achieved the highest score in the All India Senior School Certificate Examination and is set to begin his studies at IIT Madras. She falls in love with him at first sight, and decides to get admission to IIT Madras, asking her best friend Valli for help. A bemused Shanmugam allows Kamali to try, on the condition that if she fails, she must marry a relative of his choosing. Subramani, a teacher at her school, suggests she seek guidance from Arivudainambi, a retired professor. Arivudainambi meets Kamali and realizes that despite her carefree attitude, she has the potential to do well on the Joint Entrance Examinations. Under his guidance, Kamali studies sincerely and begins to excel at school, eventually earning a seat in the computer science department at IIT Madras.

AT IIT Madras, Kamali meets her roommate, a chemical engineering student who looks down on her due to her rural upbringing, and tells her that she is there to find the boy she loves. Kamali soon spots Ashwin on campus and begins following him everywhere, neglecting her classes and schoolwork. She notices Ashwin's close friendship with his classmate Priya, and starts to feel jealous. When the semester results are announced, Kamali discovers that she has failed her exams. When a professor asks why, a classmate reveals that she has been busy trying to woo her "prince". A humiliated Kamali becomes known as "Cinderella", and her love life becomes campus gossip.

Ashamed, Kamali sits alone in a deserted cafeteria, while Ashwin and his friends mock her. She overhears Ashwin referring to her as the "Cinderella" girl, and is heartbroken when he declares that he could never be the "joker" she is in love with. Kamali realizes that her roommate was the one who exposed her secret, and angrily confronts her. Although she apologizes, Kamali refuses to forgive her and returns to Naducauvery. She meets with Arivudainambi, who now teaches local children to prepare for entrance exams. Seeing his faith in her, she begins to feel guilty for wasting her time instead of focusing on her studies. Reinvigorated, she returns to college and begins studying seriously, keeping her distance from Ashwin. Her grades improve, and she and her roommate eventually reconcile.

Much to Kamali's dismay, she and Ashwin are selected for an inter-IIT National Quiz competition. Her roommate encourages her to treat it as a valuable experience, while Ashwin is annoyed that Kamali was chosen to be his partner over Priya. Ashwin and Kamali travel to Delhi with a professor for the contest. During the trip, Kamali behaves awkwardly around Ashwin, and embarrasses herself by spilling coffee on her dress. When Ashwin asks her whether she still loves her "prince", she replies that she does not know, but that he is definitely her inspiration. Upon reaching Delhi, Kamali attracts the attention of Varun Singh, a contestant from IIT Kanpur, whom Ashwin warns her to avoid.

The quiz is televised, and Kamali's family and friends watch the competition in Naducauvery. Kamali makes a mistake in the first round, but reaches the final with Ashwin after another team is disqualified. Ashwin berates her afterwards. The final matchup results in a tie between IIT Madras and IIT Kanpur; Varun chooses Kamali as his opponent for the tiebreak round, assuming she is the weaker contestant. However, Kamali answers the final question correctly and wins the quiz, delighting Ashwin and bringing tears of joy to her family, who see her as an inspiration to the children of Naducauvery. During the train journey back to Madras, Ashwin realizes that he was Kamali's crush all along. He catches her glancing at him, pours coffee over himself, and asks if he is her "prince". Smiling, Kamali replies that he might be.

== Cast ==
- Anandhi as Kamali
- Rohit Saraf as Ashwin Anand
- Pratap Pothen as Arivudainambi
- Imman Annachi as Subramani
- Azhagam Perumal as Shanmugam, Kamali's father
- Sushila Natraj as Kamali's grandmother
- Rekha Suresh as Kamali's mother
- Prabhakaran Ramu as Vishwa
- Srija Priyadharshini Jayaseelan as Valli
- Abitha Venkat as Nethra, Kamali's roommate
- T. M. Karthik as Professor
- Giri Balasubramanium as Quizmaster
- Syed Irfan as Varun Singh from IIT Kanpur
- Pradeep K Vijayan as Aparna Coaching Centre owner

== Production ==
The film began production under the title Enga Andha Vaan in July 2019, and was completed by November that year. Director Rajasekar Duraisamy said that because the film traces a woman's life from age 17 to 24, he cast Anandhi as he felt she fit that age group. It was shot in various locations including Chennai, Delhi, Hyderabad, and Pondicherry.

== Soundtrack ==
The music was composed by Dheena Dhayalan. The song "Munnoru Naalil" was released as a single in March 2020.

Track listing
No.	Title	Length

== Release ==
Kamali From Nadukkaveri was initially slated for a theatrical release on 17 April 2020, but was released on 19 February 2021 after delays related to the COVID-19 pandemic.

== Reception ==
Navein Darshan of Cinema Express wrote, "Kamali from Nadukkaveri's central theme is undoubtedly well-intentioned. But all the blemishes in the writing and making eat away at the entertainment quotient of the film". Pradeep Kumar of The Hindu criticised the film's "simplistic" plot and lack of entertainment value, concluding that it was "an unapologetic, feature-length advertisement for the IITs". Cinema Vikatan reviewed the film more favourably, but said the screenplay leaves the audience confused for almost half the film, with no idea where the story is headed, calling that the biggest problem with the screenplay.

News Today wrote, "The director has captured life in IIT campus close to reality and emotional dilemma of a rural girl who finds herself in a concrete jungle like Chennai well. The importance of education is conveyed at its best", calling Anandhi "the flesh and blood of the film" and concluded that "But for melodramatic quiz scenes at the end, Kamali From Nadukkaveri is here to engage you". Ashutosh Mohan of Film Companion gave the film a negative review mainly for its writing, and felt the title character was not well-developed. Thinkal Menon of The Times of India wrote, "Working on the believability factor and a tighter screenplay would have made the film a more gripping one".
