= Sandhya Menon =

American writer from India

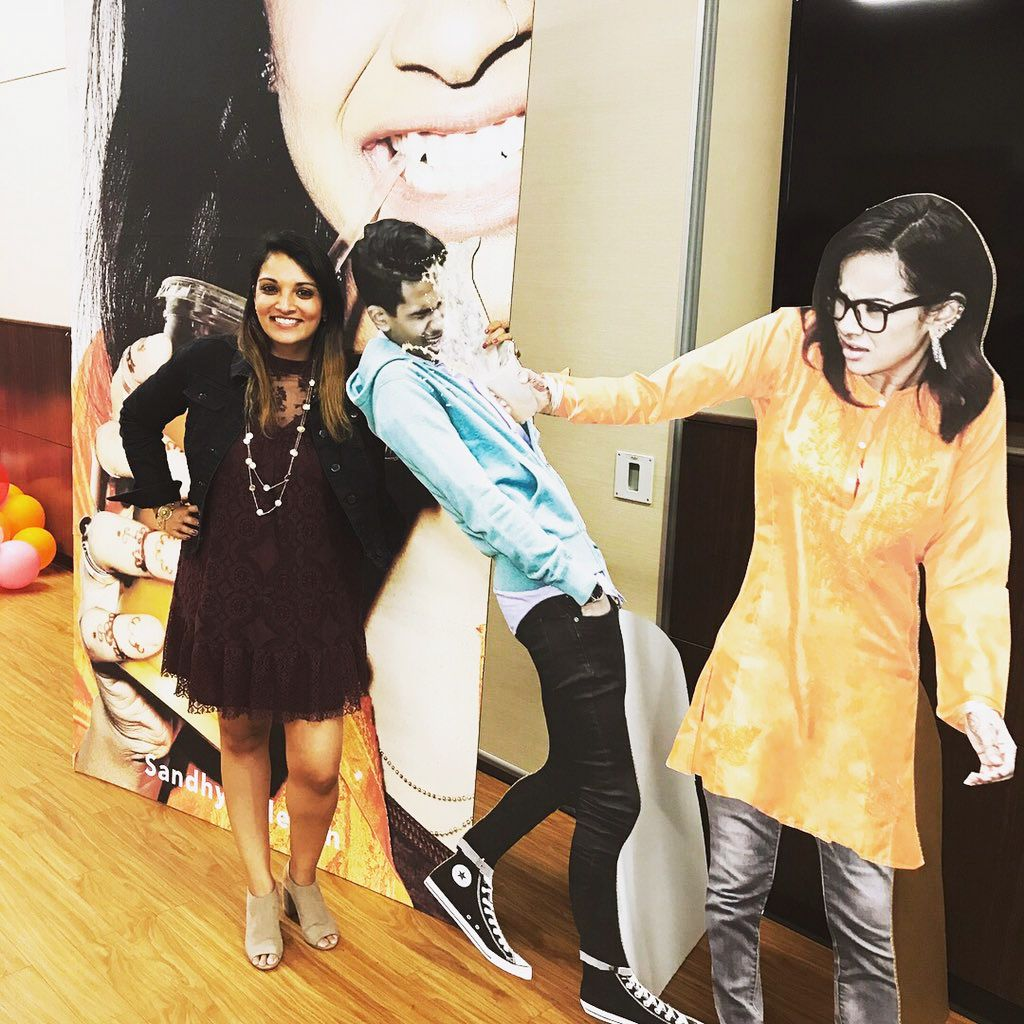
- Menon in 2017
- Born: 1983 (age 42–43); Mumbai, Maharashtra, India
- Occupation: Author
- Writing career
- Genre: Young Adult
- Website: www.sandhyamenon.com

Sandhya Menon (born 1983) is an Indian American author based in Colorado, United States. She is the author of New York Times bestseller When Dimple Met Rishi and From Twinkle, with Love.

== Early life ==
Menon was born in Mumbai, Maharashtra, India to Indian Malayali parents. She is a die-hard fan of Bollywood films. She moved to the US from India when she was fifteen years old. She had a hard-time growing up in two different cultures and says that she always wanted to be a writer, but her family pressured her to study medicine.

== Career ==
Menon writes young adult fiction for teenagers and rom-coms, often with Indian-American protagonists. Her first book When Dimple Met Rishi was published in 2017. It's a young adult rom-com about two Indian-American teenagers, Dimple and Rishi, whose parents are trying to arrange their marriage. The book was published by Hachette and was a New York Times bestseller. The book was adapted into the Netflix series Mismatched in 2020.

Menon's next book, From Twinkle, with Love, about a teenage Indian-American aspiring filmmaker who collaborates on a documentary with her crush's brother, was published by Simon Pulse in May 2018. A companion to her debut, called There's Something About Sweetie, about two Indian-American teens and an arranged marriage matched by their parents, was published in 2019.

The first book in her first series, Of Curses and Kisses, centering on a boarding school for royals and a retelling of Beauty and the Beast, will be published by Simon Pulse in 2020.

Her rom-com debut, Make-Up Break Up, about an Indian-American entrepreneur and her matchmaking business, will be published by St. Martin's Press in 2021.

== Personal life ==
Menon now lives in Colorado Springs, Colorado, with her husband and two children, a son and a daughter.

== Bibliography ==
- When Dimple Met Rishi (2017)
- From Twinkle, with Love (2018)
- There's Something About Sweetie (2019)
- As Kismet Would Have It (2019)
- Love at First Fight (2020)
- 10 Things I Hate About Pinky (2020)
- Of Curses and Kisses (2020)
- Make Up Break Up (2021)
- Of Princes and Promises (2021)
- Three Kisses, One Midnight (2022)
- Of Dreams and Destiny (2023)
