= Greater Kalesh =

2025 Indian film by Aditya Chandiok

- Official release poster
- Directed by: Aditya Chandiok
- Written by: Ritu Mago
- Produced by: Vijay Subramaniam; Sharanya Rajgopal; Anuj Gosalia
- Starring: Ahsaas Channa
- Cinematography: Shikhar Bhatnagar
- Edited by: Vibhav Nigam
- Music by: Anshul Thakkar
- Production company: Terribly Tiny Tales
- Distributed by: Netflix
- Release date: 17 October 2025
- Running time: 52 minutes
- Country: India
- Language: Hindi

Greater Kalesh is a 2025 Indian Hindi-language comedy drama short film directed by Aditya Chandiok and produced by Terribly Tiny Tales. It stars Ahsaas Channa. The film was released on 17 October 2025 on Netflix.

== Plot ==
Twinkle's unexpected return home for Diwali triggers a series of revelations and disputes within her family, forcing them to confront long-held secrets and threatening to unravel their relationships.

== Cast ==
- Ahsaas Channa as Twinkle Handa
- Supriya Shukla as Sunita Handa
- Happy Ranajit as Ranjan Handa
- Poojan Chhabra as Ankush Handa
- Akshaya Naik as Pankhuri
- Aditya Pandey as Rishi
- Keshav Mehta as Karan
- Sangeeta Balachandran as Dadi

== Release ==
Greater Kalesh was released on Netflix on 17 October 2025.

== Reception ==
Lachmi Deb Roy of Firstpost said that "Greater Kalesh is a real feel-good film and most importantly it is short and sweet and no running around the bushes. No complex characters and nothing intense, just a simple story with loads of emotion. And that’s exactly what we need at this time of the year." Arpita Sarkar of OTT Play gave 4 stars out of 5 and said that "Ahsaas Channa shines in Netflix's family drama. The short film hardly has any flaws and feels like a warm hug this festival season."

Subhash K Jha of News 24 gave 2.5 stars out of 5 and said that "Netflix’s Greater Kalesh is a warm, nostalgic slice of family life that unfolds with gentle humour and heartfelt moments. This short film captures the chaos, secrets, and love that make every family beautifully imperfect."
