= Karwaan =

2018 Indian film by Akash Khurana

- Directed by: Akarsh Khurana
- Screenplay by: Adhir Bhat; Akarsh Khurana
- Dialogues by: Hussain Dalal
- Story by: Bejoy Nambiar
- Produced by: Ronnie Screwvala; Priti Rathi Gupta
- Starring: Dulquer Salmaan; Irrfan Khan; Mithila Palkar
- Cinematography: Avinash Arun
- Edited by: Ajay Sharma
- Music by: Prateek Kuhad; Anurag Saikia; SlowCheetah; Imaad Shah
- Production companies: RSVP Movies; Ishka Films
- Distributed by: Prateek Entertainments
- Release date: 3 August 2018
- Running time: 114 minutes
- Country: India
- Language: Hindi
- Box office: ₹26.42 crore

Karwaan (transl. Caravan; Hindi pronunciation: [kaːɾʋaːn]) is a 2018 Indian Hindi-language road comedy-drama film written by Bejoy Nambiar and directed by debutant Akarsh Khurana. The film stars Dulquer Salmaan (in his Hindi film debut), Irrfan Khan (in his penultimate film) and Mithila Palkar in lead roles. It was released on 3 August 2018.

== Plot ==
Avinash Rajpurohit works for an IT company in Bengaluru. He is dissatisfied with his job and his boss, and was forced into it by his father Prakash, whom he did not have a good relationship with, and who was unsupportive of Avinash's passion for photography. One night a travel agency calls him to inform him that his father has died in a bus accident while travelling Gangotri, and that the body will be dispatched to him. He takes delivery of a corpse and hands it over to his van driver friend Shaukat. As they are about to cremate it, they discover that it is the body of an old woman. Avinash is informed that the corpse with him is that of the mother of Tahira, a widow who lives in Kochi, and that Prakash's corpse and personal effects are with her. The two decide to travel to Kochi to exchange the corpses.

Avinash and Shaukat set out when Tahira calls them, saying that her teenage daughter Tanya has gone incommunicado, possibly due to shock after hearing her grandmother's news. They go to Tanya's college in Ooty, where Avinash meets her trying to leave the hostel. Initially she is aloof and irritable, angering Shaukat, but he agrees to take her along. En route, they discover that along with the corpse is a box containing the personal effects of Latha Nambiar of Kottayam, who was also killed in the accident, but are told there that Latha's niece is getting married in Kumarakom. At the wedding, as Avinash and Tanya spend time with the groom, a gang of goons, which had been demanding payment from Shaukat for long, make off with his van. Avinash, Shaukat and Tanya—along with the wedding's aged shehnai-player, who impressed Shaukat—chase it but in vain.

Shaukat and the shehnai-player are admitted to a hospital, where Shaukat falls in love with a young woman, but is dismayed to find that she is the shehnai-player's wife. Meanwhile, Avinash and Tanya spend time at an inn, but when Tanya picks up a pregnancy test at a chemist's, they start an argument over her morals then he moves out of the pharmacy as tanya misunderstands him.After a while he goes to check upon her but she's nowhere to be found. Avinash panics and searches for her everywhere only to find her at the hospital.There they come across Avinash's doctor friend Raghu, who takes them to his home, where Avinash rekindles a long-lost friendship with Raghu's wife Rumana. Rumana and Avinash share a cup of coffee with a deep conversation, he also opens up saying that, ' I react like my dad when I'm talking to tanya, angry, unreasonable and old fashioned.' The next day, at the police station, Avinash, Shaukat and Tanya find their van wrecked, but in its place is a new car. They go to the gang's hideout on the pretext of repaying their dues, but flee when the goons arrive. Later Shaukat shares with Avinash and Tanya his experiences of him and his mother being tortured by his late father, at which they all agree that their fathers' lives and deaths have caused them great suffering.

The three reach Kochi where Tahira warmly welcomes them. That evening Avinash discovers in his father's diary that he actually wanted Avinash to retire from his job and take up photography full-time, but could not talk to him out of Avinash's resentment for him. At the prayer meet later that evening in memory of both Tahira's mother and Prakash, Tahira and Avinash make speeches for the two deceased people, who are then cremated. They spend the night at Tahira's, making merry with her friends and family. The next day Shaukat finds out that Tasneem, the shehnai-player's young wife, has been tortured by her aged husband; she asks to divorce him and Shaukat takes her along with the others back to Bengaluru. An inspired Avinash walks out of his IT job and starts a life of freedom with his new friends.

While the credits are rolling simultaneously, a scene shows Avinash organising a photography exhibition and has invited Shaukat, Tahira, Tanya, and Amey, his IT colleague. He is also in a relationship with his air hostess neighbour whom he used to meet daily in his apartment's lift.

== Cast ==
- Dulquer Salmaan as Avinash Rajpurohit
- Irrfan Khan as Shoukat
- Mithila Palkar as Tanya
- Kriti Kharbanda as Rumana Salim
- Sameer Saxena as Doctor Raghu
- Amala Akkineni as Tahira Moidenkutty
- Akash Khurana as Prakash Rajpurohit
- Bina as Tahira's mother
- Nipun Dharmadhikari as Amey
- Donna Munshi as Tasneem
- Rohit Dandwani as Office Employee
- Abir Abrar as Avinash's neighbour
- Boloram Das as Cargo officer
- Sarang Sathaye as Sanjay
- Adhaar Khurana as Rahul
- Shubrajyoti Barat as Nambiar
- Ambika Mohan as Latha Nambiar
- Adrika Shetty as Laxmi
- Habib Azmi as Aziz Hussain
- Siddharth Menon as Rajat (cameo appearance)

== Production ==
=== Development ===
In August 2013, it was reported that Akarsh Khurana, son of actor and screenwriter Akash Khurana, would be making his directorial debut with a comedy-drama written by Bejoy Nambiar, the story of which revolved around three characters on a road trip. Arvind Swamy and Nawazuddin Siddiqui were cast to play two of the three leads. In May 2014, Nambiar confirmed that as a result of changes to the script, Rajkummar Rao had been signed to replace Arvind Swamy. The film was initially titled Focus. In June 2014, Khurana opted out of the project due to creative differences with Nambiar. Nambiar signed Heeraz Marfatia however filming did not take off. After several delays Bejoy decided to postpone the project for a year and focus on his own directorial venture Wazir.

In April 2017, it was reported that Ronnie Screwvala had decided to revive Nambiar's Focus through his new production house RSVP Films and that Khurana would direct the film with Irrfan Khan and Abhishek Bachchan cast as the leads. In June 2017, Abhishek Bachchan opted out due to scheduling conflicts with J. P. Dutta's Paltan, a project he later opted out from. In August 2017, Khurana announced that Dulquer Salmaan and Mithila Palkar had been finalized to play the central characters in the film alongside Khan. On 1 September 2017, the first look of the film was unveiled under the new title Karwan.

=== Filming ===
Principal photography began on 31 August 2017. The film was shot at The Lawrence School, Lovedale near Ooty and Kochi.

== Soundtrack ==
Karwaan

Soundtrack album by Prateek Kuhad, Anurag Saikia, SlowCheetah, Shwetang Shankar and Imaad Shah
- Released: 13 July 2018
- Recorded: 2017–2018
- Genre: Feature film soundtrack
- Length: 24:46
- Language: Hindi
- Label: T-Series

Anurag Saikia chronology
High Jack (2018)	Karwaan (2018)	Mulk (2018)

The soundtrack of Karwaan consists of songs composed by Prateek Kuhad, Anurag Saikia, SlowCheetah, Shwetang Shankar and Imaad Shah with lyrics written by Prateek Kuhad, Akarsh Khurana, SlowCheetah and Shah.

Track listing
No.	Title	Lyrics	Music	Singer(s)	Length
1.	"Chota Sa Fasana"	Akarsh Khurana	Anurag Saikia	Arijit Singh	04:04
2.	"Saansein"	Prateek Kuhad	Prateek Kuhad	Prateek Kuhad	04:26
3.	"Heartquake"	Akarsh Khurana	Anurag Saikia	Papon	03:21
4.	"Dhaai Kilo Bakwaas"	SlowCheeta	SlowCheeta, Shwetang Shankar	SlowCheeta, Anish John, Sanjeev Kumar Nair, Shwetang Shankar	02:56
5.	"Kadam"	Prateek Kuhad	Prateek Kuhad	Prateek Kuhad	03:34
6.	"Bhar De Hamaara Glass"	Imaad Shah	Imaad Shah	Saba Azad	02:30
7.	"Heartquake" (Aftershocks)	Akarsh Khurana, SlowCheeta	Anurag Saikia	Papon, SlowCheeta	03:55
Total length:					24:46

== Reception ==
=== Critical reception ===
The film received mixed to positive reviews.

On the review aggregator website Rotten Tomatoes, 73% of 11 critics' reviews are positive, with an average rating of 6/10.

Hindustan Times gave 4 out of 5 stars and praised the acting of Irrfan Khan, Dulquer Salmaan and Mithila Palkar. Filmfare gave 4.1 out of 5 stars and said "Watch the film for the fine acting by Mithila and Irrfan. This comedy will surely tickle your funny bone and would make you reflect on life as well". The Times of India gave 3.5 out of 5 stars and said "Karwaan might not live up to the expectations, but it leaves a warm fuzzy feeling in the heart that says all's well that ends well". Aavishkar Gawande gave the film 3.5 stars out of 5 and called it a well made slice-of-life film. He also praised Irrfan Khan's performance. DNA India gave 3 out 5 stars and said "Irrfan Khan's film oscillates between being a fun-ride and a dark-drag". Firstpost gave 2.5 stars and wrote 'Dulquer and Irrfan are absolute dears in a sweetly understated road flick'.

=== Box office ===
The film had a below average opening with 5 – 8 percent occupancy, grossing ₹15 million worldwide on its opening day. Karwaan grossed ₹246.4 million from India and ₹17.8 million overseas for a worldwide gross of ₹264.2 million in its lifetime.

== Awards and nominations ==
Date of ceremony	Awards	Category	Recipient(s) and nominee(s)	Result	Ref.
16 February 2019	Mirchi Music Awards	Upcoming Lyricist of The Year	Prateek Kuhad – "Kadam"	Won	
16 February 2019	Mirchi Music Awards	Upcoming Lyricist of The Year	Prateek Kuhad – "Saansein"	Nominated	
16 February 2019	Mirchi Music Awards	Upcoming Male Vocalist of The Year	Prateek Kuhad – "Saansein"	Nominated	
16 February 2019	Mirchi Music Awards	Upcoming Male Vocalist of The Year	Prateek Kuhad – "Kadam"	Nominated	
16 February 2019	Mirchi Music Awards	Upcoming Music Composer of The Year	Prateek Kuhad – "Saansein"	Nominated	
16 February 2019	Mirchi Music Awards	Upcoming Music Composer of The Year	Prateek Kuhad – "Kadam"	Nominated	
31 March 2019	Zee Cine Awards	Best Male Debut	Dulquer Salmaan	Won	
