= Prateek Kuhad =

Indian singer-songwriter (born 1990)

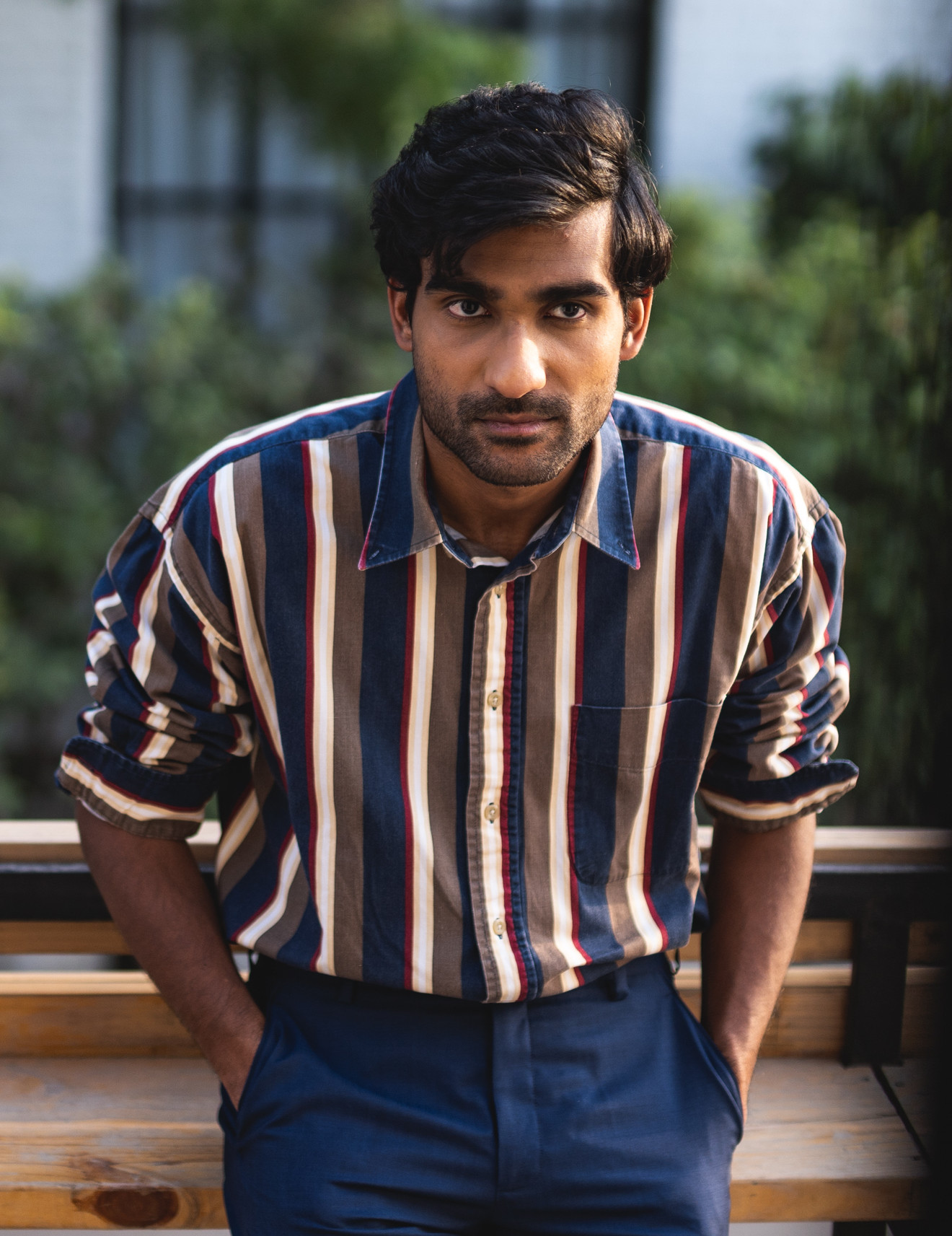
- Kuhad in 2018

Background information
- Born: 3 March 1990 (age 36); Jaipur, Rajasthan, India
- Origin: Jaipur, India
- Genres: Indie folk
- Occupations: Singer-songwriter; musician
- Instruments: Vocals; guitar; piano
- Years active: 2011–present
- Labels: Elektra Records; Pagal Haina
- Website: prateekkuhad.com

Prateek Kuhad (born March 3, 1990) is an Indian singer-songwriter and musician who makes independent music in Hindi and English. He is best known for his track "Kasoor" and "Co2".

== Early life ==
Kuhad is the son of Paras Kuhad who was the additional Solicitor General of India from 2012 to 2014. His birth place is Jaipur, Rajasthan, and he has two sisters. He learnt to play the guitar at age 16 and started songwriting in his late teens. He graduated high school at Maharaja Sawai Man Singh Vidyalaya, in Jaipur. Later, he studied Maths and Economics at New York University before moving to Delhi to pursue a full-time career in music.

== Career ==
After graduating from New York University, Kuhad returned to India and released his first EP, the self titled Prateek Kuhad, and Raat Raazi in 2013. His debut album, In Tokens & Charms, was released in 2015. He also signed a publishing deal with Los Angeles–based company Cutcraft Music. Kuhad became the first Indian artist to be signed by the American record label Elektra Records in 2020.

Kuhad released his third album, The Way That Lovers Do, on May 20, 2022. In 2026, he released his fourth studio album, Full Moon Chamber.

== Musical style and influences ==
During his time in NYU, Kuhad discovered Elliott Smith's music, which had a great influence on him. He then discovered other singer-songwriters such as Bob Dylan and Woody Guthrie along with newer artists like Laura Marling and Fleet Foxes. These artists inspired him to get better at guitar and start writing his own songs. These went on to become his major influences.

Kuhad was comfortable with communicating in both English and Hindi from the start and has been writing in both the languages. In his childhood, as there was no internet service, he predominantly listened to Indian pop and Bollywood music and only occasionally to Western music. He was also inspired by Lucky Ali.

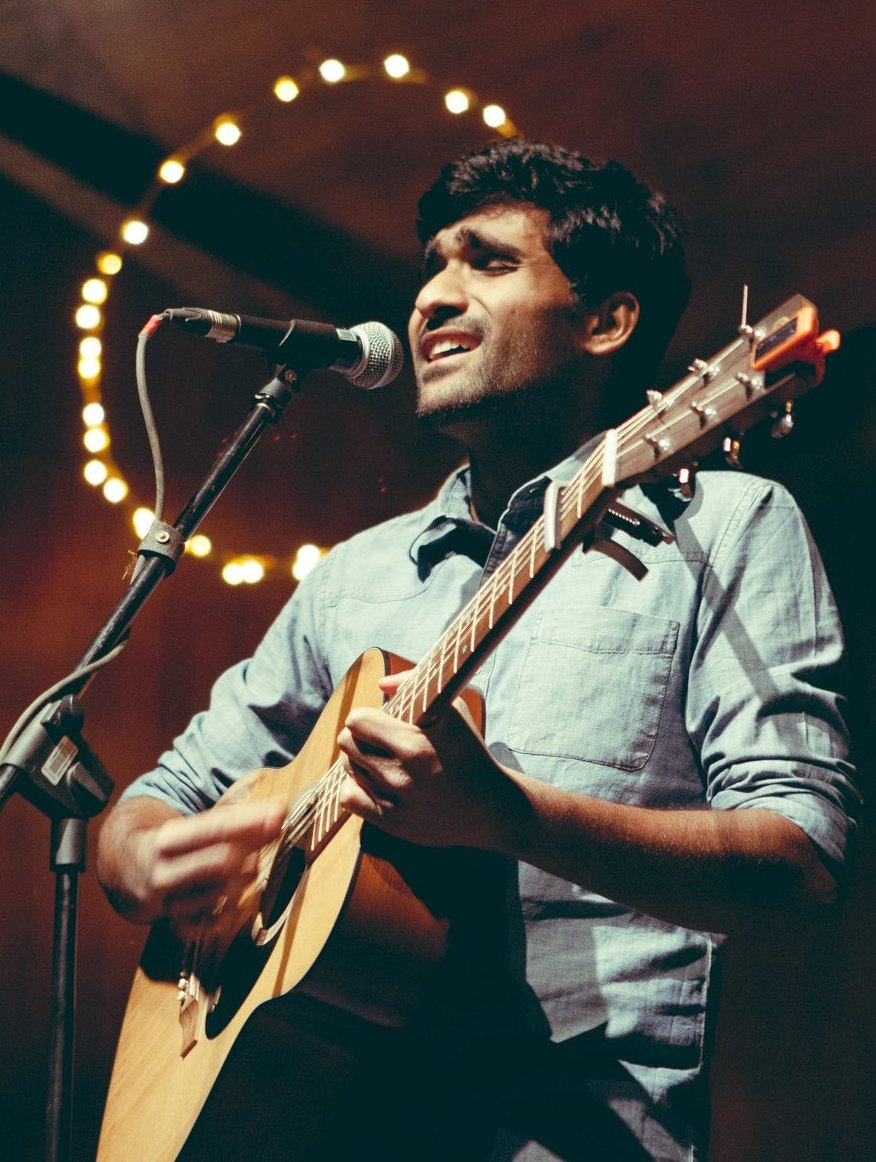
Prateek Kuhad performing

Kuhad's primary instrument is the acoustic guitar. He also plays other instruments like piano and electric guitar. His music leans towards Americana and folk genres with acoustic sounds and unconventional song structures for the most part. His music has been praised as being "beautifully haunting" by Us Weekly and his vocals as being "angelic" by BrooklynVegan.

He mostly writes about love, relationships and his experiences, with vague lyrics that are open to interpretation.

== Awards and recognition ==
- Indian Indie Album of the Year 2019 by iTunes and Spotify: Top Indian Indie Hits
- The Best India Act at the 2016 MTV Europe Music Awards
- Best Pop Artist Award at the Radio City Freedom Awards 2018

Kuhad's 2018 song "cold/mess", from the eponymous EP, was featured on former US president Barack Obama's "Favorite Music of 2019" list.

== Discography ==
=== Albums & EPs ===
Year	Album / EP	Track
2011	Prateek Kuhad	Something Wrong
2011	Prateek Kuhad	Rubber Bits
2011	Prateek Kuhad	A Shot of Alcohol
2013	Raat Raazi	Ab Hoga Kya
2013	Raat Raazi	Raat Raazi
2013	Raat Raazi	Chahe Ya Na Chahe
2013	Raat Raazi	Voh
2013	Raat Raazi	Yeh Pal
2015	In Tokens & Charms	Oh Love
2015	In Tokens & Charms	Holding On
2015	In Tokens & Charms	Flames
2015	In Tokens & Charms	Into the Night
2015	In Tokens & Charms	Go
2015	In Tokens & Charms	Fire
2015	In Tokens & Charms	Held You Tight
2015	In Tokens & Charms	Be At Ease
2015	In Tokens & Charms	Cold Shoulders
2015	In Tokens & Charms	Artist
2017	In Token & Charms (Deluxe Version)	Oh Love
2017	In Token & Charms (Deluxe Version)	Holding On
2017	In Token & Charms (Deluxe Version)	Flames
2017	In Token & Charms (Deluxe Version)	Into The Night
2017	In Token & Charms (Deluxe Version)	Go
2017	In Token & Charms (Deluxe Version)	Fire
2017	In Token & Charms (Deluxe Version)	Held You Tight
2017	In Token & Charms (Deluxe Version)	Be At Ease
2017	In Token & Charms (Deluxe Version)	Cold Shoulders
2017	In Token & Charms (Deluxe Version)	Artist
2017	In Token & Charms (Deluxe Version)	Tonight
2017	In Token & Charms (Deluxe Version)	Big Surprise
2017	In Token & Charms (Deluxe Version)	Just To Be With You
2017	In Token & Charms (Deluxe Version)	Flames - Piano Version
2019	cold/mess	with you/for you
2019	cold/mess	did you/fall apart
2019	cold/mess	cold/mess
2019	cold/mess	for your time
2019	cold/mess	fighter
2019	cold/mess	100 words
2019	cold/mess	cold/mess - edit
2021	Shehron Ke Raaz	Shehron Ke Raaz
2021	Shehron Ke Raaz	Khone Do
2021	Shehron Ke Raaz	Tere Hi Hum
2021	Shehron Ke Raaz	Kasoor - Acoustic
2022	The Way That Lovers Do	All I Need
2022	The Way That Lovers Do	Hollow
2022	The Way That Lovers Do	Favorite Peeps
2022	The Way That Lovers Do	Co2
2022	The Way That Lovers Do	Face
2022	The Way That Lovers Do	Just A Word
2022	The Way That Lovers Do	Drown
2022	The Way That Lovers Do	The Last Time
2022	The Way That Lovers Do	Heartbroken
2022	The Way That Lovers Do	Bloom
2022	The Way That Lovers Do	Full Time Lover
2023	The Way That Lovers Do (Deluxe Version)	All I Need
2023	The Way That Lovers Do (Deluxe Version)	Hollow
2023	The Way That Lovers Do (Deluxe Version)	Favorite Peeps
2023	The Way That Lovers Do (Deluxe Version)	Co2
2023	The Way That Lovers Do (Deluxe Version)	Face
2023	The Way That Lovers Do (Deluxe Version)	Just A Word
2023	The Way That Lovers Do (Deluxe Version)	Drown
2023	The Way That Lovers Do (Deluxe Version)	Heartbroken
2023	The Way That Lovers Do (Deluxe Version)	Bloom
2023	The Way That Lovers Do (Deluxe Version)	Full Time Lover
2023	The Way That Lovers Do (Deluxe Version)	Hopelessly
2023	The Way That Lovers Do (Deluxe Version)	I Never Knew
2023	The Way That Lovers Do (Deluxe Version)	Bloom (feat. Raveena)
2023	The Way That Lovers Do (Deluxe Version)	All I Need - acoustic
2023	The Way That Lovers Do (Deluxe Version)	Hollow - acoustic
2023	The Way That Lovers Do (Deluxe Version)	Just A Word - acoustic
2023	The Way That Lovers Do (Deluxe Version)	The Last Time - acoustic
2023	The Way That Lovers Do (Deluxe Version)	Heartbroken - acoustic
2023	Mulaqat	Mulaqat
2023	Mulaqat	O Piya
2023	Mulaqat	Kuch Din
2023	Mulaqat	Hum Dono
2023	Mulaqat	Janeman

=== Singles & collaborations ===
Year	Track	Note(s)
2016	Kho Gaye Hum Kahan	Released as part of the soundtrack of the film Baar Baar Dekho
2016	Tune Kaha	
2016	Dil Beparwah	Collaboration between Ankur Tewari & Prateek Kuhad Released as part of The Dewarists
2017	Tum Jab Paas	
2018	Saansein	Released as part of the soundtrack of the movie Karwaan
2018	Kadam	Released as part of the soundtrack of the movie Karwaan
2020	Pause	
2020	Kasoor	
2020	Kahaan Ho Tum	Released as part of the soundtrack of the Netflix show Mismatched
2020	The Biggest Lie (Elliott Smith remake)	
2021	cold/mess (on piano)	
2023	Hopelessly	
2023	Kaisi Jadugari	
2023	Mere Sang feat.Lisa Mishra	Collaboration between Lisa Mishra & Prateek Kuhad
2023	Co2 – Acoustic	
2023	Mulaqat	Released as a single but part of the episode "Mulaqat"
2023	O Piya	Released as a single but part of the episode "Mulaqat"
2024	No Complaints	

=== Soundtracks ===
Year	Film	Song	Composer(s)	Singer(s)	Writer(s)
2016	Baar Baar Dekho	Kho Gaye Hum Kahan	Jasleen Royal	Jasleen Royal, Prateek Kuhad	Prateek Kuhad
2018	Karwaan	Saansein	Prateek Kuhad		
2018	Karwaan	Kadam	Prateek Kuhad		
2018	Lust Stories	Tu Kaha	Prateek Kuhad		
2020	Mismatched	Kaahan Ho Tum	Prateek Kuhad		
2021	Ajeeb Daastaans	Kuch Na Kaho	Prateek Kuhad		
2021	Dhamaka	Kasoor – Acoustic	Prateek Kuhad		
