= High Jack (film) =

- Theatrical release poster
- Directed by: Akarsh Khurana
- Written by: Akarsh Khurana
- Story by: Adhir Bhat
- Produced by: Nickhil Jakatdar; Arun Prakash; Vikramaditya Motwane; Vikas Bahl; Madhu Mantena
- Starring: Sumeet Vyas; Mantra; Sonnalli Seygall
- Cinematography: Mikhaeil Shah; Parthiva Nag
- Edited by: Ajay Sharma
- Music by: Nucleya; Shwetang Shankar; Slowcheeta; Rajat Tiwari; Anurag Saikia
- Production companies: Phantom Films; Viu
- Release date: 18 May 2018
- Country: India
- Language: Hindi
- Box office: ₹ 0.34 crore

High Jack is a 2018 Indian Hindi-language comedy stoner film directed by Akarsh Khurana, starring Sumeet Vyas, Mantra and Sonnalli Seygall. The film's theatrical trailer was launched on 27 March 2018. It was released on 18 May 2018. Upon release, the film received negative reviews & was a declared a disaster at the box office.

== Plot ==
An aspiring DJ is duped by a conman and he inadvertently acts as a drug mule. Hilarity ensues when the flight he is on gets hijacked by a group of well meaning employees of the airline, and every one unknowingly gets high on the drug.

== Cast ==
- Sumeet Vyas as Rakesh
- Mantra as Vinit
- Sonnalli Seygall as Dilshaad
- Kumud Mishra as Mr. Taneja
- Priyanshu Painyuli as Chaitanya
- Shiv Kumar Subramaniam
- Amey Wagh
- Boloram Das as iPad Man
- Taaruk Raina as Parth

== Soundtrack ==
High Jack

Soundtrack album by Nucleya, Vibha Saraf, Slowcheeta, Shwetang Shankar, Anurag Saikia & Rajat Tiwari
- Released: 5 April 2018
- Genre: Feature film soundtrack
- Length: 21:35
- Label: Zee Music Company
External audio
- Audio Jukebox on YouTube

Tracklist
No.	Title	Lyrics	Music	Singer(s)	Length
1.	"Behka"	Vibha Saraf	Nucleya & Vibha Saraf	Vibha Saraf	03:55
2.	"Kripya Dhyaan De"	SlowCheeta	SlowCheeta & Shwetang Shankar	SlowCheeta	02:13
3.	"Aapaatkaaleen"	Akarsh Khurana	Nucleya	Lisha Bajaj & Mantra	02:12
4.	"Prabhu Ji"	Akarsh Khurana	Anurag Saikia	Asees Kaur	03:30
5.	"Happy Ending Song"	Akarsh Khurana	Rajat Tiwari	Sumedha Karmahe & Taaruk Raina	02:39
6.	"Prabhu Ji"	Akarsh Khurana	Anurag Saikia	Suvarna Tiwari	03:27
7.	"Happy Ending Song"	Rajat Tiwari	Akarsh Khurana	Taaruk Raina & Manasi Mulherkar	02:39
Total length:					21:35
