= My Love: Six Stories of True Love =

2021 TV documentary series

- Genre: Documentary
- Starring: David Isham; Ginger Isham; Michael Isham
- Countries of origin: United States; Brazil; Japan; Spain; India
- Original languages: Portuguese; Japanese; English; Marathi; Spanish
- No. of seasons: 1
- No. of episodes: 6

Production
- Running time: 64–73 minutes

Original release
- Network: Netflix
- Release: April 13, 2021

My Love: Six Stories of True Love is a 2021 docuseries released on Netflix on April 13, 2021, starring David Isham, Ginger Isham and Michael Isham.

== Cast ==
- David Isham
- Ginger Isham
- Michael Isham
- Dee Riete as Nicinha
- William Skiff
- Asit Vyas as Satyabhama
- Mita Vyas as Satrva

== Episodes ==
No.	Title	Original release date
1	"USA: Ginger & David"	April 13, 2021
Retirees David and Ginger raised a family and ran a thriving farm. Still active, they prepare for the end by prepping their wills and making arrangements.
2	"Spain: Nati & Augusto"	April 13, 2021
Augusto and Nati's flirty repartee keeps them in good spirits as they deal with Augusto failing his driver's test and confronting health problems.
3	"Japan: Kinuko & Haruhei"	April 13, 2021
Kinuko has cared for Haruhei ever since they met at the facility where he was treated for leprosy. But now it's his turn to be the caretaker.
4	"Korea: Saengja & Yeongsam"	April 13, 2021
Saengjam and Yeongsam are lifelong abalone farmers, but Saengja's body is breaking down. She wants to keep working, but their children want them to sell.
5	"Brazil: Nicinha & Jurema"	April 13, 2021
Nicinha and Jurema have been together for 43 years, raising a large family in a crowded favela, while dreaming of retiring in the country.
6	"India: Satyabhama & Satva"	April 13, 2021
Cotton farmers Satyabhama and Satva are vulnerable to climate change. As their crops diminish, their sons are forced to leave them to face old age alone.
