= Rohit Saraf =

Indian actor (born 1996)

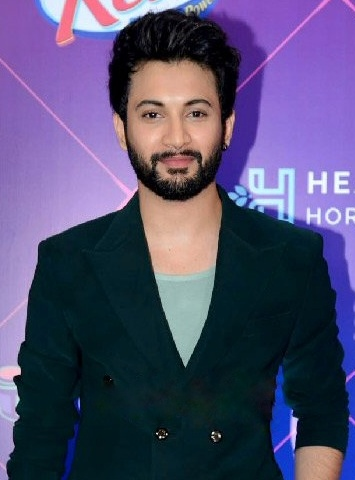
- Saraf in 2023
- Born: Rohit Suresh Saraf; 8 December 1996 (age 29); Kathmandu, Nepal
- Occupation: Actor
- Years active: 2012–present

Rohit Saraf (born 8 December 1996) is an Indian actor who primarily works in Hindi films and television. He began his career on television and made his film debut with the comedy drama Dear Zindagi (2016). Saraf is best known for the comedy drama Hichki (2018), the biopic The Sky Is Pink (2019), the dark comedy Ludo (2020), and the romantic comedy Ishq Vishk Rebound (2024) and Sunny Sanskari Ki Tulsi Kumari (2025). He is widely recognized with his portrayal of Rishi in the Netflix romantic drama Mismatched (2020–2026). In 2025, Saraf was placed by Forbes Asia in their 30 Under 30.

== Early life ==
Rohit Saraf was born on 8 December 1996 in Kathmandu, Nepal into an Marwari-Nepali family. He later moved back with his family to Delhi, being raised there. At the age of 15, he moved alone to Mumbai to pursue his late father's dream to make him an actor.

His father, Suresh Saraf, died when Rohit was 12 years old. He had only completed his 10th standard before focusing on his passion of becoming an actor.

== Career ==
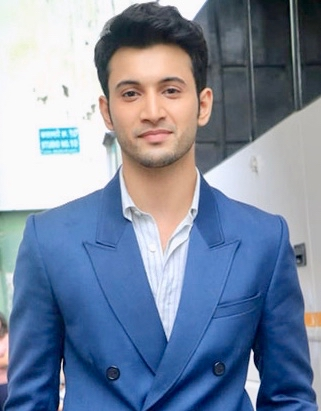
Saraf in 2019

Saraf began his career with several television shows, including the Channel V's teen drama Best Friends Forever?. He made his film debut as the younger brother of Alia Bhatt's character in the coming-of-age film Dear Zindagi (2016). Saraf then played the cousin of the lead character in the Norwegian drama What Will People Say, which was selected as the Norwegian entry for the Best Foreign Language Film at the 91st Academy Awards.

In 2018, Saraf appeared in Yash Raj Films' comedy-drama Hichki, starring Rani Mukerji. He then starred alongside Priyanka Chopra and Zaira Wasim in the biographical drama The Sky Is Pink (2019). Reviewing the film for NDTV, Saibal Chatterjee wrote that Saraf "gives a solid account of himself" and Anna M. M. Vetticad of Firstpost opined that he "delivers a rock solid performance".

In 2020, Saraf appeared alongside an ensemble cast in Anurag Basu's black comedy Ludo. Sreeparna Sengupta of The Times of India commended him for standing out despite minimal dialogues. In the same year, he began starring alongside Prajakta Koli in the Netflix romantic drama series Mismatched. Raja Sen of Mint Lounge credited him for creating a "refreshingly non-alpha hero", and Poulomi Das of Firstpost labelled him "sincere".

Saraf played a leading role opposite Anandhi in the Tamil romantic drama Kamali From Nadukkaveri (2021), and appeared in Vikram Vedha (2022) as the younger brother of Hrithik Roshan's character. In 2024, Saraf had his first Hindi film lead role in the romantic comedy Ishq Vishk Rebound. Mayur Sanap of Rediff.com panned the film but took note of Saraf's "charming enough screen presence".

In 2025, Saraf played a minor role in Mani Ratnam's Tamil film Thug Life and starred in Dharma Productions' romantic comedy Sunny Sanskari Ki Tulsi Kumari. The film opened to mixed reviews. He will next star in the television series The Revolutionaries directed by Nikkhil Advani.

== Filmography ==
=== Films ===
Key
†	Denotes films that have not yet been released

- All films are in Hindi unless otherwise noted.

Year	Title	Role	Notes	Ref.
2016	Dear Zindagi	Kabir "Kiddo"		
2017	Dear Maya	Neil		
2017	What Will People Say	Amir	Norwegian film	
2018	Hichki	Akshay Verma		
2019	The Sky Is Pink	Ishaan Chaudhary		
2020	Ludo	Rahul Awasthi		
2021	Kamali From Nadukkaveri	Ashwin Anand	Tamil film	
2022	Vikram Vedha	Shatak		
2024	Woh Bhi Din The	Rahul Sinha		
2024	Ishq Vishk Rebound	Raghav Pandit		
2025	Thug Life	Ranvijay "Raanu" Yadav	Tamil film	
2025	Sunny Sanskari Ki Tulsi Kumari	Vikram Singh		
TBA	Mahakali †	TBA	Telugu film	

=== Television ===
Year	Title	Role	Notes	Ref.
2012–2013	Best Friends Forever?	Sahil Mehta		
2013–2014	Ek Boond Ishq	Bunty		
2015	MTV Big F	Gyan	Episode: "Love Just Happens"	
2020–present	Mismatched	Rishi Singh Sekhawat		
2021	Feels Like Ishq	Aditya	Episode: "Star Host"	
2026	The Revolutionaries	Sachindranath Sanyal		

=== Music video appearances ===
Year	Title	Singer(s)	Ref.
2021	"Shola"	Akasa Singh	

== Awards and nominations ==
Year	Award	Category	Work	Result	Ref.
2023	Pinkvilla Style Icons Awards	Mould Breaker (Male)	—N/a	Won	
2023	Bollywood Hungama Style Icons	Most Stylish Trailblazer	—N/a	Nominated	
2023	Bollywood Hungama Style Icons	Most Stylish Emerging Icon	—N/a	Nominated	
2024	Bollywood Hungama Style Icons	Most Stylish Mould-Breaking Talent of the Year	—N/a	Nominated	
