= Anurag Saikia =

Indian music composer, music director, instrumentalist and music producer

- Born: Moran, Assam, India
- Genres: Film score, independent music
- Occupations: Film composer, music director, music producer, instrumentalist
- Instruments: Keyboard, synthesizers and piano

Anurag Saikia (born in December 1988) is an Indian film score composer, music director, music producer and instrumentalist from Moran, Assam, India. He is one of the youngest composers to be awarded Rajat Kamal for Best Non-Feature Film Music Direction for the film Yugadrashta.

His mother Dipali Saikia, is an All India Radio artist and teacher and his father Dr. Anil Saikia is an academician, who was conferred the Pratima Barua Pandey memorial Award on 27 December 2011 for his contributions towards the preservation and popularization of folk culture and music of the State of Assam.

After completing graduation from Cotton College, Anurag was admitted into the Swarnabhumi Academy of Music (SAM), Chennai. One of the latest movies he composed music for, is Thappad. He has worked with many popular artists like Sonu Nigam, Arijit Singh etc.

Saikia is known for his initiative of syncing Borgeets to the symphonic orchestra.

== Discography ==
=== Film ===
- Prague (2012)
- Yugadrashta
- Holding Back
- The Job (2014)
- One Last Question (2015)
- Chor: The Bicycle (2016)
- Dikchow Banat Palaax (2016)
- III Smoking Barrels (2017)
- Maj Rati Keteki (2017)
- Ishu (2017)
- Manjha (2017)
- Rainbow Fields (2018)
- Toba Tek Singh (2018)
- High Jack (2018)
- Karwaan (2018)
- Mulk (2018)
- Market (2019)
- Article 15 (2019)
- Thappad (2020)
- Serious Men (2020)
- Kaun Pravin Tambe? (2022)
- Anek (2022)
- Babli Bouncer (2022)
- Bheed (2023)
- Dhak Dhak (2023)
- Mast Mein Rehne Ka (2023)
- Swargarath (2024)
- Bhakshak (2024)
- Dedh Bigha Zameen (2024)
- Phir Aayi Hasseen Dillruba (2024)
- The Diplomat (2025)
- Jolly LLB 3 (2025)
- Nishaanchi (2025)
- Nishaanchi 2 (2025)

=== As Playback Singer ===
- Bheed (2023)

=== Web Series ===
- Stories by Rabindranath Tagore (2015)
- Cubicles (2019–)
- Cheesecake (2019)
- Gullak (2019–)
- Mismatched (2020–)
- Panchayat (2020–)
- Kaun Banegi Shikharwati (2022)
- Unpaused: Naya Safar (2022-)
- Love Storiyaan (2024)
- Bada Naam Karenge (2025)
- Operation Safed Sagar (2026)

=== As Music Producer (Independent Music) ===
- 'Va Kanamma' The Anurag Saikia Collective
- 'Kukuha' The Anurag Saikia Collective (2020)

== Awards and nominations ==
Award	Category	Film	Song	Result	Ref.
61st National Film Awards	Best Music Director (Non-Feature Film)	Yugadrashta		Won	
Big Music Award 2010	Best Music Director	Tup Tup		Won	
Swarnabhoomi Academy of Music	Student Brand Ambassador			Won	
Prag Cine Award 2013	Best Music Director	Shinyor		Won	
Prag Cine Award 2017	Best Music Director	Majrati Keteki		Won	
Sailadhar Baruah Award 2017	Best Music Director	Dixou Banat Palash		Won	
Sher Choudhury Excellence Award 2017	Best Music Director	Majrati Keteki		Won	
Radio Gup Shup Award 2018	Best Music Director	Majrati Keteki		Won	
10th Mirchi Music Awards	Best Song		Bas Ek Baar	Nominated	
9th Mirchi Music Awards	Best Song Producer (Programming & Arranging)	Dangal	"Dhaakad"	Nominated	
Jio Filmfare Awards (Marathi) 2018	Best Background Score	Manjha		Nominated	
