= Jugaadistan =

Indian comedy drama television series

- Promotional release poster
- Genre: comedy drama
- Created by: Divya Rao
- Written by: Anant Tripathi; Parijat Joshi; Tarun Dudeja; Unaiza Merchant
- Directed by: Akarsh Khurana; Adhaar Khurana
- Starring: Sumeet Vyas; Arjun Mathur; Parambrata Chattopadhyay; Rukshar Dhillon; Taaruk Raina; Gopal Datt; Ahsaas Channa
- Music by: Khamosh Shah
- Country of origin: India
- Original language: Hindi
- No. of seasons: 1
- No. of episodes: 8

Production
- Executive producer: Sanjeevkumar Nair
- Producer: Rohit Jain
- Cinematography: Akash Agrawal
- Editors: Jitendra Dongare; Sanyukta Kaza; Vansh Mehta
- Production company: Lionsgate India

Original release
- Network: Lionsgate Play
- Release: 4 March 2022

Jugaadistan is a 2022 Indian Hindi-language comedy drama television series produced under the banner of Lionsgate India. The series stars Sumeet Vyas, Arjun Mathur, Parambrata Chattopadhyay, Rukshar Dhillon, Taaruk Raina, Gopal Datt and Ahsaas Channa. It premiered on Lionsgate Play on 4 March 2022.

== Cast ==
- Sumeet Vyas as Gaurav Bhati
- Arjun Mathur as Tarush Khetrapal
- Parambrata Chattopadhyay as Bijoy Das
- Rukshar Dhillon as Ruhi Sada
- Taaruk Raina as Lucky Kohli
- Gopal Datt as Nadeem Dalvi
- Ahsaas Channa as Ayesha Rehman
- Tanvi Azmi as Kamala Reddy
- Himika Bose as Aarti Chatterjee
- Lukram Smil as Kenny Laishram
- Aamir Mallick as Prashant Bharti
- Priyank Tiwari as Nishant Kumar
- Akash Khurana as Dharmaesh Mistry
- Adhir Bhat as Bobby Nagra

== Production ==
The series was announced by Lionsgate India, consisting of eight episodes. Sumeet Vyas, Arjun Mathur, Parambrata Chattopadhyay, Rukshar Dhillon, Taaruk Raina, Gopal Datt and Ahsaas Channa joined the cast. The principal photography of the series commenced during the COVID-19 pandemic. It was primarily shot in Delhi, Daryaganj and Paharganj. The cast promoted the series on Kshitij 2022.

== Reception ==
The series was reviewed by Manik Sharma for Firstpost, Abhimanyu Mathur for Hindustan Times and Sonil Dedhia of News18.

Sunidhi Prajapat of OTT Play rated the series 2/5 stars. Ronak Kotecha of The Times of India rated the series 3/5 stars. Prateek Sur of Outlook India gave it a rating of 3.5/5 stars.
