= Ahsaas Channa =

Indian actress (born 1999)

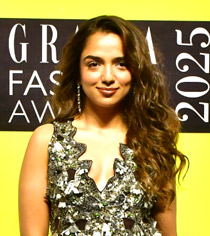
- Channa in 2025
- Born: 5 August 1999 (age 27); Mumbai, Maharashtra, India
- Education: University of Mumbai
- Occupation: Actress
- Years active: 2004–present

Ahsaas Channa (born 5 August 1999) is an Indian actress who works in the Hindi film and TV industry. As a child actress, she worked in Vaastu Shastra, Kabhi Alvida Naa Kehna, My Friend Ganesha, Phoonk, among others, and as a teenager, She has also worked in the TV serial Crime Patrol Satark. She has been mostly active in television shows, such as Devon Ke Dev...Mahadev, Oye Jassie and MTV Fanaah.

== Early life ==
Channa was born in Mumbai, Maharashtra on 5 August 1999 into a family hailing from Jalandhar, Punjab. Her father Iqbal Singh Channa is a Punjabi film producer while her mother Kulbir Kaur Badesron is a television actress. She has an elder sister, Mehak Channa. She completed her graduation in psychology from Mumbai University.

== Career ==
Channa started her career at a very young age. She made her debut with the movie Vaastu Shastra where she played the role of Rohan, Sushmita Sen's son. She also played the role of Ashu in My Friend Ganesha and Arjun in Kabhi Alvida Naa Kehna. She played her first role as a girl in the horror film Phoonk in 2008.

On television, she acted in Nikhil Sinha's Devon Ke Dev...Mahadev as Ashokasundari. She also played the role of Dhara in MTV Fanaah, the mini TV series that aired on MTV India starting on 21 July 2014. She was seen in Disney Channel's show Oye Jassie and in the fourth season of Best of Luck Nikki.

== Filmography ==
=== Films ===
Year	Title	Role	Notes	Ref.
2004	Vaastu Shastra	Rohan		
2004	Marrichettu		Telugu film	
2006	Kabhi Alvida Naa Kehna	Arjun Saran		
2006	Aryan	Ranveer		
2007	My Friend Ganesha	Ashu		
2008	Phoonk	Raksha		
2009	Bommayi	Raksha	Tamil dubbed version of Phoonk	
2009	Love Kaa Taddka	Chintu Chaturvedi		
2010	Phoonk 2	Raksha		
2013	340	Vimal		
2017	Appavin Meesai		Tamil film	
2017	Rukh	Shruti		
2025	Greater Kalesh	Twinkle Handa	Netflix film	

=== Television ===
Year	Title	Role	Notes	Ref.
2008	Kasamh Se	Young Ganga Walia		
2012	Gumrah: End of Innocence			
2012	Savdhaan India	Episodic roles		
2012	Madhubala – Ek Ishq Ek Junoon	Swati Dixit		
2012	Devon Ke Dev...Mahadev	Ashokasundari		
2013	Fear Files: Darr Ki Sacchi Tasvirein			
2013	Oye Jassie	Ayesha Malhotra		
2014	Crime Patrol Dastak	Smrity	Episode: False Pride	
2014	Webbed	Unnamed		
2014	MTV Fanaah	Young Dharaa		
2015	Crime Patrol Dial 100	Malini	Episode: Shadyantra	
2015	Code Red – Talaash	Sarika		
2015	Best of Luck Nikki	Riya		
2015	Gangaa	Saloni		
2016	Crime Patrol			
2016	Aadha Full	Kitty Yadhav		
2017	Crime Patrol Satark	Namrata	Episode: Death of Lovers	
2017	MTV Big F	Diya	Season 2	
2018	CID	Komal		

=== Web series ===
Year	Title	Role	Note	Ref.
2018–2022	Girls Hostel	Richa		
2019–2024	Kota Factory	Shivangi		
2019–2023	Hostel Daze	Akanksha		
2020–2021	The Interns	Lilly		
2021	Clutch	Prachi		
2022	Jugaadistan	Ayesha Rehman		
2022	Modern Love Mumbai	Siya		
2022–2024	Mismatched	Vinny	Season 2-3	
2022–present	Sisters	Mahi		
2023–2025	Half CA	Archie		
TBA	O Saathi Re †	TBA	Filming	

=== Short films ===
Year	Title	Role	Ref.
2021	Transistor	Uma	

=== Music video appearances ===
Year	Title	Singer(s)	Ref.
2006	"I Love You Sayyoni"	Himesh Reshammiya	
2024	"O Beliya"	Darshan Raval	

== Awards and nominations ==
Year	Award	Category	Work	Result	Ref.
2020	Filmfare OTT Awards	Best Supporting Actress: Comedy	Hostel Daze	Nominated	
2023	Filmfare OTT Awards	Best Supporting Actress: Comedy	Hostel Daze	Nominated	

== See also ==
- List of Indian film actresses
- List of Hindi film actresses
