= Prajakta Koli =

Indian YouTuber and actress (born 1993)

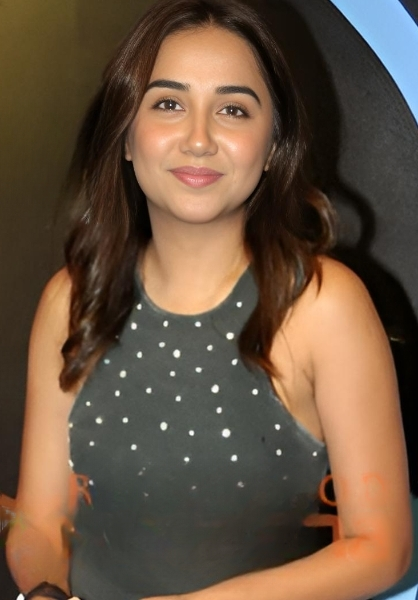
- Koli in 2023
- Born: 27 June 1993 (age 33); Thane, Maharashtra, India
- Education: V. G. Vaze College of Arts, Science and Commerce; Mumbai University
- Occupations: YouTuber; actress, Author
- Years active: 2015–present
- Spouse: Vrishank Khanal (m. 2025)

YouTube information
- Channel: MostlySane
- Genre: Comedy
- Subscribers: 7.25 million
- Views: 1.97 billion
- Last updated: 30 May 2026
- Website: mostlysane.in

Prajakta Koli (pronounced [pɾad͡ʑəkta koɭi]; born 27 June 1993) is an Indian YouTuber, author, novelist, and actress. She is best known for her YouTube channel MostlySane and for her starring role in the Netflix romantic drama series Mismatched (since 2020) and Single Papa (2025). She has also played a supporting role in the films Jugjugg Jeeyo (2022) and Sunny Sanskari Ki Tulsi Kumari (2025).

== Early and personal life ==
Prajakta was born and brought up in Thane, Maharashtra. She studied in Vasant Vihar High School and graduated with a Bachelor of Mass Media from V. G. Vaze College of Arts, Science and Commerce in Mulund. Her father is a restaurateur.

In 2023, Koli announced her engagement to her longtime boyfriend, lawyer Vrishank Khanal. They both had a 13 year long courtship period and met when Prajakta was 18 year old and Vrishank was 22. On 25 February 2025, Koli tied the knot with Khanal in Karjat.

== Career ==
=== Early career and YouTube channel ===
Koli began her career as an intern at Fever 104 FM radio station in Mumbai as a RJ, and later launched a YouTube channel.

Koli launched her channel MostlySane in February 2015. She performed at the YouTube FanFest in Delhi in 2018 and in Mumbai in 2019. In 2020, she announced the launch of her YouTube Originals show Pretty Fit. The first episode was released on 21 January.

In April 2019, former YouTube CEO Susan Wojcicki selected Prajakta Koli's "Real Talk Tuesday" series as the interview platform for her first-ever interaction with an Indian YouTuber. The series also includes interviews with Sadhguru and actors like Adam Sandler and Jennifer Aniston.

In July 2025, Koli became the first Indian content creator to be featured on the TIME100 Creators list, which recognized 100 influential digital creators from around the world.

=== Acting ===
In July 2020, Koli released a short film, Khayali Pulao. She then acted in the Netflix series Mismatched, released in November 2020. In 2022, she was seen in Dharma Productions' film Jugjugg Jeeyo and Mismatched (Season 2). In 2023, she headlined a Zee Theatre teleplay called Yeh Shaadi Nahi Ho Sakti directed by Akarsh Khurana. She featured in Anu Menon's mystery film Neeyat, alongside Vidya Balan, Ram Kapoor, Rahul Bose, Mita Vasishth, Neeraj Kabi, Shahana Goswami, Amrita Puri, Dipannita Sharma and Shashank Arora. In 2025, She appeared in horror show Andhera (TV series) produced by Excel Entertainment for Prime Video.

She made her debut in Marathi cinema with Krantijyoti Vidyalay Marathi Madhyam which was become commercial success.

=== Other work ===
Koli was a part of a 9-episode Audible series set in Sydney called Desi Down Under, along with Adarsh Gourav and Taaruk Raina. Another Audible original podcast in Hindi, an adaptation of Marvel's Wastelanders will be released in June 2023 with Prajakta voicing the Marvel character Ash Barton. In December 2018, she was in one of three national TV commercials launched for a WhatsApp campaign.

She has written a romance novel "Too Good To Be True" published by HarperCollins India.It sold 150,000 copies in its first month of release.

== Media ==
In February 2019, she was part of Forbes' list of 30 under 30 and in Outlook Business Magazine's list of Women of Worth and Entrepreneur India's list of 35 under 35 along with winning Cosmopolitan's YouTuber of the Year award.

In January 2020, she was included in the annual "Cool list" of the gossip magazine Grazia India, and in April 2020 she was featured on the cover of the magazine BW Businessworld as part of their Most Influential Women's list.

She was presented an award by Chief Minister Arvind Kejriwal along with Cameron MacKay, High Commissioner of Canada in India, in recognition of her helping women's causes during International Women's Day in March 2022.

In June 2022, she was awarded the "Star Influencer Award" by Femina India.

In March 2024, she was awarded Climate Influencer of the Year by NDTV.

== Social initiatives ==
=== 2016–2019 ===
On World Mental Health Day in 2016, Koli launched her campaign #iPledgeToBeMe which addresses mental health, well-being and body shaming. She shared her experiences of body shaming and wrote a rap song, "Shameless", featuring Indian rapper Raftaar, in May 2017.

In 2018, Prajakta was invited to the United Nations headquarters on the occasion of International Day of Tolerance, as an ambassador for YouTube's global initiative, Creators for Change program. In 2018, she participated in the #GirlsCount campaign for One.Org.

In September 2019, she traveled to the UN as a delegate to participate in the International Day of Tolerance and for the Goalkeepers program. She has also been appointed a new member to the 2022-24 Goalkeepers Advisory Group.

=== 2020–2021 ===
In a special episode of Creators For Change in 2020, Koli and two other YouTube content creators, Liza Koshy and Thembe Mahlaba, interviewed girls in different countries about their opportunities for education, and discussed the topic with Michelle Obama.

Prajakta represented India at The Call To Unite event which started on 1 May 2020 and featured Oprah Winfrey, Julia Roberts, Eva Longoria, Deepak Chopra, Alanis Morissette, Quincy Jones and Mandy Moore among others. The 24 hour 'streamathon' event was organized by UNITE and Room To Read in support of people facing challenges during the pandemic and to promote education among children during the COVID-19 pandemic. On 7 June 2020, Koli was a part of the virtual graduation ceremony, Dear Class of 2020, headlined by former President Barack Obama and former First Lady Michelle Obama which was live streamed via YouTube Originals.

On 30 October 2021, Koli made a contribution to TED's campaign called 'Countdown,' which focused on addressing the issue of climate change. She collaborated with personalities including Al Gore, Chris Hemsworth, Priyanka Chopra, Mark Ruffalo, and Don Cheadle, in discussions and initiatives centered around climate change awareness.

=== 2022–present ===
In January 2022, she was appointed UNDP India's first Youth Climate Champion.

In January 2023, Prajakta attended the World Economic Forum held in Davos. In March 2023, the National Commission for Women with Netflix hosted an event on the role of entertainment and media in empowering women. Prajakta was part of the panel discussions.

== Filmography ==
Key
†	Denotes films that have not yet been released

=== Films ===
Year	Title	Role	Notes	Ref.
2020	Khayali Pulao	Asha	Short film	
2022	Jugjugg Jeeyo	Ginny Saini		
2023	Yeh Shaadi Nahi Ho Sakti	Priya	ZEE Theatre film	
2023	Neeyat	Gigi "Cub Kumar"		
2025	Sunny Sanskari Ki Tulsi Kumari	Dimple	Cameo appearance	
2026	Krantijyoti Vidyalay Marathi Madhyam	Anjali Rane	Marathi film	

=== Television ===
Year	Title	Role	Notes	Ref.
2020–present	Mismatched	Dimple Ahuja	3 seasons	
2021	Comedy Premium League	Host		
2024	Zindaginama	Mira		
2025	Andhera	Rumi		
2025	Single Papa	Namrata Gehlot	Netflix series	
2026	Operation Safed Sagar	Madhavi	Netflix series	

=== Music video appearances ===
Year	Title	Singer	Ref.
2024	"Lost and Found"	Taaruk Raina	
2025	"Raazdaariyan"	Sagar Bhatia	

== Discography ==
=== Singles ===
Year	Title	Ref.
2017	"Shameless" (featuring Raftaar)	
2018	"No Offence"	
2020	"Yeh Diss Gaana Hai"	
2020	"Par Lockdown Ho Gaya"	

== Awards and nominations ==
Year	Award	Category	Work	Result	Ref.
2021	Daytime Emmy Awards	Outstanding Daytime Non-Fiction Special	Documentary - Creators For Change	Won	
2023	Bollywood Hungama Style Icons	Most Stylish Digital Entertainer (Female)	—N/a	Won	
2023	Filmfare Awards	Best Female Debut	Jugjugg Jeeyo	Nominated	
2024	Bollywood Hungama Style Icons	Most Stylish Digital Star of the Year	—N/a	Won	

== See also ==
- List of YouTubers
- List of Indian comedians
