= Jasleen Royal =

Indian singer, songwriter and composer (born 1991)

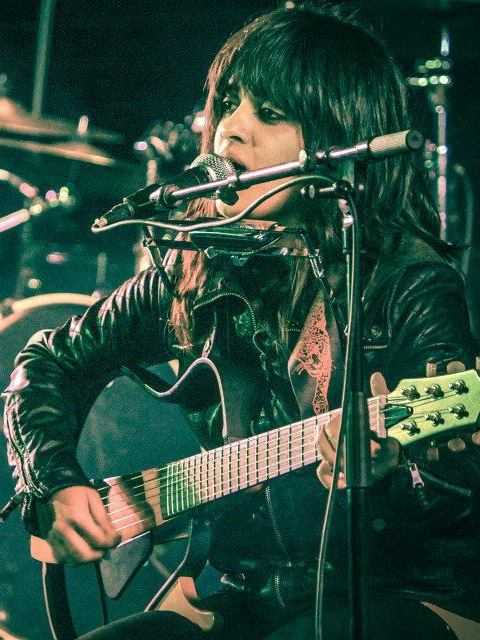
- Jasleen Royal performing in Rajasthan

Background information
- Born: Jasleen Kaur Royal; 8 July 1991 (age 34); Ludhiana, Punjab, India
- Occupations: Singer; songwriter; actor
- Instruments: Vocals; guitar; harmonica
- Years active: 2013–present

Jasleen Kaur Royal is an Indian singer, songwriter and composer who sings in Punjabi, Hindi, Bengali and Gujarati. She received the Filmfare Award. In 2022, she won the Filmfare Award for Best Music Director for the film Shershaah (2021).

She won an award for the "Best Indie Artist" at "Free The Music" an initiative by Songdew.

She entered Bollywood in September 2014 with Sonam Kapoor and Fawad Khan starrer film Khoobsurat with a song titled "Preet" which was composed by Sneha Khanwalkar and written by Amitabh Verma.

== Early life and background ==
Kaur was born in Ludhiana, Punjab, to a Punjabi Sikh family. She completed her schooling from Sacred Heart Convent School, Ludhiana and later moved to New Delhi for further studies. She completed her B. Com Honors from Hindu College, New Delhi.

She currently resides in Mumbai and is working on multiple Bollywood projects. Jasleen has performed alongside Coldplay for their Music of the Spheres World Tour in India. Jasleen has performed on NDTV Our Girls, Our Pride along with Swanand Kirkire hosted by Priyanka Chopra. She had also appeared and performed at L'Oréal Paris Miss Femina (India) Awards, 2014. Jasleen has also participated in a debate on NDTV India on 'How money is not the bigger factor while choosing an employment'.

== Discography ==
=== Singles ===
Year	Song title	Album/Series	Notes
2013	Panchi Hojavan	MTV	Composer and singer
2013	Maye Ni	Single featuring Swanand Kirkire	Composer and singer
2013	Din Shagna Da	Single	Composer and singer
2014	Door Ghar Mera hai	Kitkat	Composer and singer
2020	Nit Nit	Single	Composer and singer
2020	Sang Rahiyo	Single	Composer and singer
2020	Jaana	Mismatched	*Composer, singer and lyricist *Co-singer Soundarya Jayachandran
2023	Heeriye	Single featuring Dulquer Salmaan	*Composer and singer *Co-singer Arijit Singh
2024	Sahiba	Featuring Vijay Devarakonda	*Composer and singer *Co-singer Stebin Ben
2025	Koi Naam	Single	*Composer and singer *Co-singer Aditya Sharma
2025	"Bheegi Bheegi"	Single featuring Dulquer Salmaan, Mrunal Thakur	*Composer A. R. Rahman; *Co-singer A. R. Ameen
2026	"Inaam"	Featuring Badshah	

=== Soundtracks ===
Year	Song	Film	Music	Singer(s)	Lyrics	Notes
2014	Preet	Khoobsurat	Sneha Khanwalkar	Jasleen Royal	Amitabh Verma	
2015	Badla Badla	Badlapur	Sachin-Jigar	Vishal Dadlani, Suraj Jagan, Jasleen Royal	Priya Saraiya, Dinesh Vijan	
2016	Kho Gaye Hum Kahan	Baar Baar Dekho	Jasleen Royal	Jasleen Royal, Prateek Kuhad	Prateek Kuhad	
2016	Nachde Ne Saare	Baar Baar Dekho	Jasleen Royal	Harshdeep Kaur, Siddharth Mahadevan, Jasleen Royal	Aditya Sharma	
2016	Raatein	Shivaay	Jasleen Royal	Jasleen Royal	Aditya Sharma	
2016	Raatein (Reprise)	Shivaay	Jasleen Royal	Jasleen Royal	Aditya Sharma	
2016	Love You Zindagi	Dear Zindagi	Amit Trivedi	Jasleen Royal, Amit Trivedi	Kausar Munir	
2016	Chotta Hoon Main	Dear Dad	Ujjwal Kashyap	Jasleen Royal	Neeraj Rajawat	
2017	Kidre Jawa	Haramkhor	Jasleen Royal	Jasleen Royal	Aditya Sharma	Solo Composer
2017	What's Up	Phillauri	Jasleen Royal	Mika Singh, Jasleen Royal	Aditya Sharma	
2017	Din Shagna Da Remake	Phillauri	Jasleen Royal	Jasleen Royal	Neeraj Rajawat	
2017	Peh Gaya Khalara	Fukrey Returns	Jasleen Royal	Divya Kumar, Akasa Singh, Akansha Bhaduri, Jasleen Royal	Aditya Sharma	
2017	Amar Drawing Khata (Reprise)	Chhaya O Chhobi	Indraadip Dasgupta	Jasleen Royal	Kaushik Ganguly	Bengali film
2017	Har Mod Par Umeed Hai	Ribbon	Sagar Desai	Jasleen Royal	Puneet Sharma	
2018	Oye Hichki	Hichki	Jasleen Royal	Harshdeep Kaur	Jaideep Sahni	Solo Composer
2018	Soul of Hichki	Hichki	Jasleen Royal	Harshdeep Kaur	Jaideep Sahni	Solo Composer
2018	Madamji Go Easy	Hichki	Jasleen Royal	Benny Dayal and various others	Raj Shekhar, David Klyton	Solo Composer
2018	Khol De Par	Hichki	Jasleen Royal	Arijit Singh	Raj Shekhar	Solo Composer
2018	Teri Dastaan	Hichki	Jasleen Royal	Jasleen Royal	Neeraj Rajawat	Solo Composer
2018	Phir Kya Hai Gham	Hichki	Jasleen Royal	Shilpa Rao	Aditya Sharma, Neeraj Rajawat	Solo Composer
2018	Naina's Theme	Hichki	Jasleen Royal	Instrumental		Solo Composer
2018	Laaj Sharam	Veere Di Wedding	White Noise	Divya Kumar, Enbee	White Noise	
2018	Man Melo	Sharato Lagu	Parth Bharat Thakkar	Jasleen Royal, Siddharth Amit Bhavsar		Gujarati film
2018	Man Melo (Reprise Sad)	Sharato Lagu	Parth Bharat Thakkar	Jasleen Royal, Siddharth Amit Bhavsar		Gujarati film
2018	Man Melo (Theme)	Sharato Lagu	Parth Bharat Thakkar	Jasleen Royal, Siddharth Amit Bhavsar		Gujarati film
2019	Jahan Tu Chala	Gully Boy	Jasleen Royal	Jasleen Royal	Aditya Sharma	Won - Filmfare Award for Best Music Director
2019	Deh Shiva (Female)	Kesari	Jasleen Royal	Jasleen Royal	Guru Gobind Singh Ji	Nominated - Filmfare Award for Best Music Director
2020	Bird Song	Ghoomketu	Jasleen Royal	Jasleen Royal	Pushpendra Nath Mishra	Zee5 film
2021	Ranjha	Shershaah	Jasleen Royal	B Praak, Jasleen Royal, Romy	Anvita Dutt	Amazon Prime Video film Won - Filmfare Award for Best Music Director
2021	Ranjha (Reprise)	Shershaah	Jasleen Royal	B Praak, Jasleen Royal, Romy	Anvita Dutt	Amazon Prime Video film Won - Filmfare Award for Best Music Director
2021	Khoya Paya (Female version)	Dhamaka	Vishal Khurana	Jasleen Royal	Puneet Sharma	Netflix film
2021	Udd Chaliyan	Velle	Jasleen Royal	Shahid Mallya, Jasleen Royal	Aditya Sharma	
2022	Mitra Re	Runway 34	Jasleen Royal	Jasleen Royal, Arijit Singh	Aditya Sharma	Solo Composer
2022	Mitra Re (Reprise)	Runway 34	Jasleen Royal	Jasleen Royal, Arijit Singh	Aditya Sharma	Solo Composer
2022	Mitra Re (Arijit Singh Version)	Runway 34	Jasleen Royal	Arijit Singh	Aditya Sharma	Solo Composer
2022	The Fall Song	Runway 34	Jasleen Royal	Jasleen Royal	Aditya Sharma	Solo Composer
2022	The Fall Song (English Version)	Runway 34	Jasleen Royal	Jasleen Royal	Aditya Sharma	Solo Composer
2024	Jaavi Na	Ishq Vishk Rebound	Rochak Kohli	Darshan Raval	Kumaar	

== Awards ==
Year	Award	Song	Film	Title	Result	Shared with	Ref.
2016	Mirchi Music Awards	"Raatein"	Shivaay (film)	Upcoming Music Composer of The Year	Nominated		
2019	Filmfare Awards	"Deh Shiva (Female)"	Kesari	Best Music Director	Nominated	Along with Tanishk Bagchi, Arko Pravo Mukherjee, Chirantan Bhatt, Jasbir Jassi, Gumroh	
2022	Filmfare Awards	-	Shershaah	Best Music Director	Won		
