= Imaad Shah =

Indian actor and musician

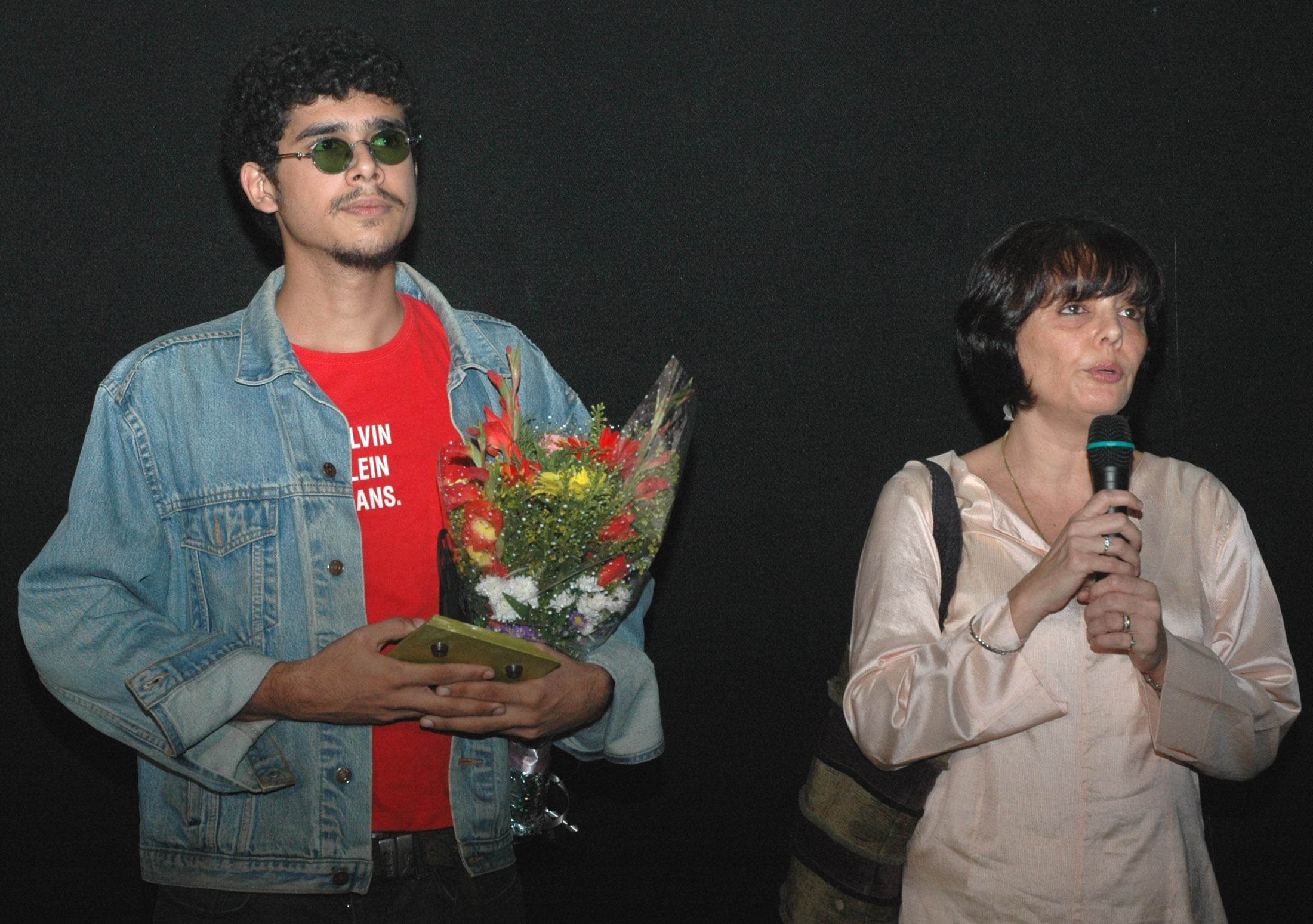
- Imaad at IFFI 2008
- Born: Imaaduddin Shah; 20 September 1986 (age 40); Mumbai, Maharashtra, India
- Occupations: Actor; musician
- Years active: 2006–present
- Parents: Naseeruddin Shah; Ratna Pathak Shah
- Relatives: Shah family

Imaaduddin Shah (also credited as Imaad Shah; born 20 September 1986) is an Indian actor and musician.

== Early life ==
Imaad was born to actors Naseeruddin Shah and Ratna Pathak on 20 September 1986 in Mumbai. He has a brother Vivaan and a paternal half-sister Heeba. He did his schooling at The Doon School in Dehradun and then graduated from St. Xavier's College in Mumbai.

== Career ==
Imaad made his acting debut in 2006 in his father's Yun Hota To Kya Hota. In 2007, he acted in Dil Dosti Etc under Prakash Jha, where he played a young Delhi University student with a penchant for the secret corners of the old town.

He is also a theatre actor and works with the theatre company Motley, founded by Naseeruddin Shah and Benjamin Gilani. He has been a part of many productions including Katha Collage, Waiting for Godot, By George and Manto Ismat Haazir Hain, apart from working with other groups.

He bounced back with his next film Sooni Taraporevala's award-winning Little Zizou (2009) which traveled to film festivals all across Europe, North America and parts of Asia.

Subsequent releases, including 404, Tasher Desh and Mira Nair's The Reluctant Fundamentalist saw him playing dark and memorable characters.

He is part of the electro funk/nu disco duo Madboy/Mink with Saba Azad and is the frontman and guitarist/vocalist for the funk/disco band The Pulp Society.

Imaad Shah was recently seen in the web series 'A Married Woman', directed by Sahir Raza. The star cast also includes Ridhi Dogra, Monica Dogra.

=== Madboy/Mink ===
Shah is one half of the electro-cabaret duo Madboy/Mink, alongside Saba Azad. The duo performed at the debut edition of Lollapalooza India on 28–29 January 2023, held at Mahalaxmi Racecourse, Mumbai.

== Personal life ==
In 2006, he fell out of a moving local train in Mumbai and was hospitalized with serious injuries on his head and legs.

From 2013 to 2020, Imaad dated actress and musician Saba Azad. However they remain friends after their breakup and make music together for their band Mad Boy Mink.

== Filmography ==
=== Films ===
Year	Title	Role	Notes
1988	Pestonjee		
1988	The Perfect Murder	Ved Ghote	
2006	Yun Hota To Kya Hota	Joy	
2007	Dil Dosti Etc	Apurv	
2009	Little Zizou	Artaxerxes Khodaiji	
2009	Ek Tho Chance		
2011	404	Chris	
2013	The Reluctant Fundamentalist	Sameer Khan	
2013	Tasher Desh	Ruiton	
2014	M Cream	Figs	
2019	Posham Pa	Gundeep Singh	
2020	Home Stories		Anthology film
2021	Dybbuk	Abraham Ezra	

=== Television ===
Year	Title	Role	Notes
2021	Bombay Begums	Ron	
2021	The Married Woman	Aijaz	
2021	The Empire	Qasim	
2022	Modern Love Mumbai	Himself	Episode: "Mumbai Dragon"
2023	Charlie Chopra	Billu	
2023	Made in Heaven 2	Roman	Episode: “A taste of heaven”

== Discography ==
=== Soundtrack appearances ===
Year	Title	Song	Functioned as			Notes
Year	Title	Song	Singer	Lyricist	Composer	Notes
2011	404	"Aisa Hi Hai"; "Chal Soch Le"; "Kya Dekh Raha Hai"; "Psycho Baba"	Yes	Yes	Yes	
2015	Detective Byomkesh Bakshy!	"Calcutta Kiss"	Yes	Yes	Yes	Co-written, sung and composed with Saba Azad
2018	Karwaan	"Bhar De Hamaare Glass"	No	Yes	Yes	
2020	Mismatched	"Milne Ka Bahaana"	Yes	No	Yes	Co- composed music with Samar Grewal

== Awards and nominations ==
Year	Award	Category	Nominated work	Result	Ref.
2008	Stardust Awards	Best Breakthrough Performance- Male	Dil Dosti Etc	Nominated	
2008	ACEB Awards	Breakthrough Role- Actor	Dil Dosti Etc	Nominated	
