= Akarsh Khurana =

Indian writer and director

- Born: Mumbai, Maharashtra, India
- Education: St. Xavier's College, Mumbai
- Occupations: Actor; screenwriter; film director; producer
- Father: Akash Khurana

Akarsh Khurana is an Indian film director, screenwriter and actor, who is the son of actor Akash Khurana, critically acclaimed for writing and directing various shows. His notable works are TVF Tripling (as a writer), Yeh Meri Family (as an actor), Mismatched (as a director) and Krrish (as a supporting screenplay writer).

== Biography ==
He started his career in the entertainment sector from the film Museum Ke Andar Phans Gaya Sikandar (a dubbed version of Night at the Museum).

In September 2020, He started a new company Troika Productions along with his brother Adhaar Khurana.

Along with web series and films he performs in theaters as well.

He directed sports drama film Rashmi Rocket which stars Tapsee Pannu.

== Films and web series ==
†	Denotes Projects that have not yet been released

Year	Title	Credited as	Role	Notes
2006	Museum Ke Andar Phans Gaya Sikandar	Dubbing Artist		Dubbed Film
2006	Krrish	Screenwriter		
2006	Sarhad Paar	Screenwriter		
2008	Mumbai Calling	Actor	Call Centre Operator	Web series
2008	U Me Aur Hum	Screenwriter		Web series
2009	The President is Coming	Line Producer & Actor	Presidential Chef	
2010	Kites	Additional Dialogues & Screenplay		
2011	Dum Maaro Dum	Casting Director		
2013	David	Actor	Iqbal Ghani	
2013	Krrish 3	Screenwriter		
2014	Humshakals	Screenwriter		
2014	The Job	Director		Web Series
2014	Sunsilk Real FM	Director		Advertisement
2016	Befikre	Actor	Jogi Gill (Shyra's dad)	
2016–19	TVF Tripling	Writer		Web Series
2017	Baapjanma	Actor	Ashok	
2017	Boygiri	Director		Web Series
2018	Yeh Meri Family	Actor	Papa	TVF Web Series
2018	Karwaan	Screenplay, Director & Lyricist		
2018	High Jack	Director & Writer		
2019	Dhumrapaan	Actor & Director	Rastogi	CinePlay
2020	Bhangra Paa Le	Actor		
2020	Ram Singh Charlie	Actor	Nabeel	Sony Liv Film
2020	Wakaalat From Home	Actor	Judge Khurana	Web Series
2020	Mismatched	Director		Netflix Web Series
2021	Rashmi Rocket	Director		Zee5 Film
2022	Jugaadistan	Director		Web series
2024	Ishq Vishk Rebound	Actor	Raghav's Father	Tips Industries Film
