= Jay Oza =

Indian Cinematographer

Jay Pinak Oza
- Born: Jay Pinak Oza; Vadodara, Gujrat, India
- Education: Maharaja Sayajirao University (Bachelor of Fine Arts); Prague Film School (Cinematography)
- Occupation: Cinematographer
- Years active: 2006-present
- Organization: Pink Window Productions
- Awards: Filmfare Award; Zee Cine Award; Asia Pacific Screen Award

Jay Pinak Oza is an Indian cinematographer known for his work in Hindi films and web series. He has worked on notable projects such as Raman Raghav 2.0, Blackmail, Gully Boy, Made in Heaven, Ghoul and Toofaan. He was selected as one of the ten participants for the BAFTA Breakthrough India talent initiative in 2021.

== Early life and education ==
Oza was born and raised in Vadodara, Gujarat, India. He pursued a Bachelor of Fine Arts (B.F.A.) from Maharaja Sayajirao University of Baroda, majoring in art history and aesthetics. During his college years, he interned as a set production assistant (PA), which sparked his interest in filmmaking.

Initially working on set as a PA and assistant director on films such as Rang De Basanti and Jodhaa Akbar, Oza developed an interest in cinematography. To gain formal training, he attended the Prague Film School, where he studied the technical aspects of cinematography.

== Career ==
=== Early work ===
After returning to India, Oza assisted cinematographers Ayananka Bose and Sudeep Chatterjee on several projects. His first independent cinematography work was on the music documentary series The Dewarists (Season 1 and 2). He also worked on the Indian adaptation of the TV series 24.

Oza made his feature film debut with Anurag Kashyap's Raman Raghav 2.0 in 2016. He subsequently worked on Ghoul, Blackmail, and the web series Made in Heaven (Season 1).

=== Breakthrough and major works ===
Oza gained widespread recognition for his work on Zoya Akhtar's Gully Boy (2019), which he described as his breakthrough project. In the film, Oza’s cinematography captured the narrow streets of Mumbai and the contrasting high life of Delhi, blending realism with visual storytelling.

He has also worked on Rakeysh Om Prakash Mehra's Toofaan (2021), Aryan Khan’s streaming series The Bas***ds of Bollywood (2025), and upcoming film Jee Le Zaraa which will be directed by Farhan Akhtar.

== Cinematographic style ==
Oza’s work has been noted for its focus on realism and emotional sensitivity in his visual storytelling. He emphasizes the importance of capturing the environment authentically, as seen in Gully Boy, where mixed lighting conditions in Dharavi were maintained without over grading, creating an immersive experience. He cites cinematographers Roger Deakins and Christopher Doyle as key influences and often adapts his style to suit the narrative and characters of each project.

He has discussed the collaborative nature of filmmaking, highlighting the balance between technical execution and managing production dynamics on set.

== Recognition ==
In 2021, Oza was selected for the BAFTA Breakthrough India talent initiative, a year-long mentoring program aimed at supporting the next generation of Indian film, television, and games talent. He was recognized for his work on Gully Boy and was among a cohort chosen by a jury of industry experts including Anupam Kher, Mira Nair, and Monika Shergill.

== Filmography ==
=== Films ===
Year	Title	Director	Role	Notes
2006	Rang De Basanti	Rakeysh Omprakash Mehra	Set Production Assistant	
2006	I see You	Vivek Agrawal	Assistant Director	
2007	Loins of Punjab Presents	Manish Acharya	Assistant Director	
2008	Jodhaa Akbar	Ashutosh Gowariker	Set Production Assistant	
2016	Raman Raghav 2.0	Anurag Kashyap	Cinematographer	
2018	Blackmail	Abhinay Deo	Cinematographer	
2019	Gully Boy	Zoya Akhtar	Cinematographer	
2020	Unpaused	Nikkhil Advani, Avinash Arun, Tannishtha Chatterjee, Krishna D.K., Nitya Mehra, Raj Nidimoru	Cinematographer	
2021	Toofaan	Rakeysh Omprakash Mehra	Cinematographer	
2023	Haddi	Akshat Ajay Sharma	Cinematographer	
2024	Yudhra	Ravi Udyawar	Cinematographer	

=== Series ===
Year	Title	Director	Role	Notes
2011–2012	The Dewarists	Vishwesh Krishnamoorthy, Ayesha Sood	Cinematographer	
2012	Bring on the Night	Vishwesh Krishnamoorthy	Cinematographer	
2013	24	Rensil D'Silva, Abhinay Deo, Nitya Mehra	Cinematographer	
2014	Tandanu	Spandan Banerjee	Cinematographer	
2016	Love Shots	Manoj Sharma, Ankur Tiwari	Cinematographer "Episode 2 named Textbook"	
2018	Ghoul	Patrick Graham	Cinematographer	
2019	Voice of the Streets	Arjun Varain Singh, Siddhant Goswami, Zoya Akhtar	Cinematographer	
2019	Made in Heaven	Nitya Mehra, Zoya Akhtar, Reema Kagti, Prashant Nair, Alankrita Shrivastava, Neeraj Ghaywan	Cinematographer	
2019	Flip	Bejoy Nambiar, Aman Sachdeva	Cinematographer	
2022	Vir Das: Landing	Vir Das	Cinematographer	
2025	The Ba***ds of Bollywood	Aryan Khan	Cinematographer	

=== Short Films ===
Year	Title	Director	Role	Notes
2016	Chutney	Jyoti Kapur Das	Cinematographer	
2018	August 25	Gautam Parvi	Cinematographer	

== Awards and nominations ==
Year	Award	Category	Outcome	Work	Notes
2016	Asia Pacific Screen Awards	Achievement in Cinematography	Nominated	Raman Raghav 2.0	
2020	FOI Online Award	Best Cinematography	Won	Gully Boy	
2020	Filmfare Award	Best Cinematography	Won	Gully Boy	
2020	IIFA Award	Best Cinematography	Won	Gully Boy	
2020	Zee Cine Award	Best Cinematography	Won	Gully Boy	
2020	Screen Award	Best Cinematography	Won	Gully Boy	
