= Filmfare Awards (disambiguation) =

Filmfare Awards refers to Filmfare Awards for Hindi-language film industry

Filmfare Awards may also refer to :

- Filmfare Awards South, Filmfare Awards for South Indian film industries
- Filmfare Marathi Awards, Filmfare Awards for Marathi-language film industry
- Filmfare Awards Bangla, Filmfare Awards for Bengali-language film industry
- Filmfare Awards East, Filmfare Awards for East Indian film industries
- Filmfare Awards Punjabi, Filmfare Awards for Punjabi-language film industry
- Filmfare OTT Awards
- Filmfare Short Film Awards
