= Manish Gupta (director) =

Indian film director and writer

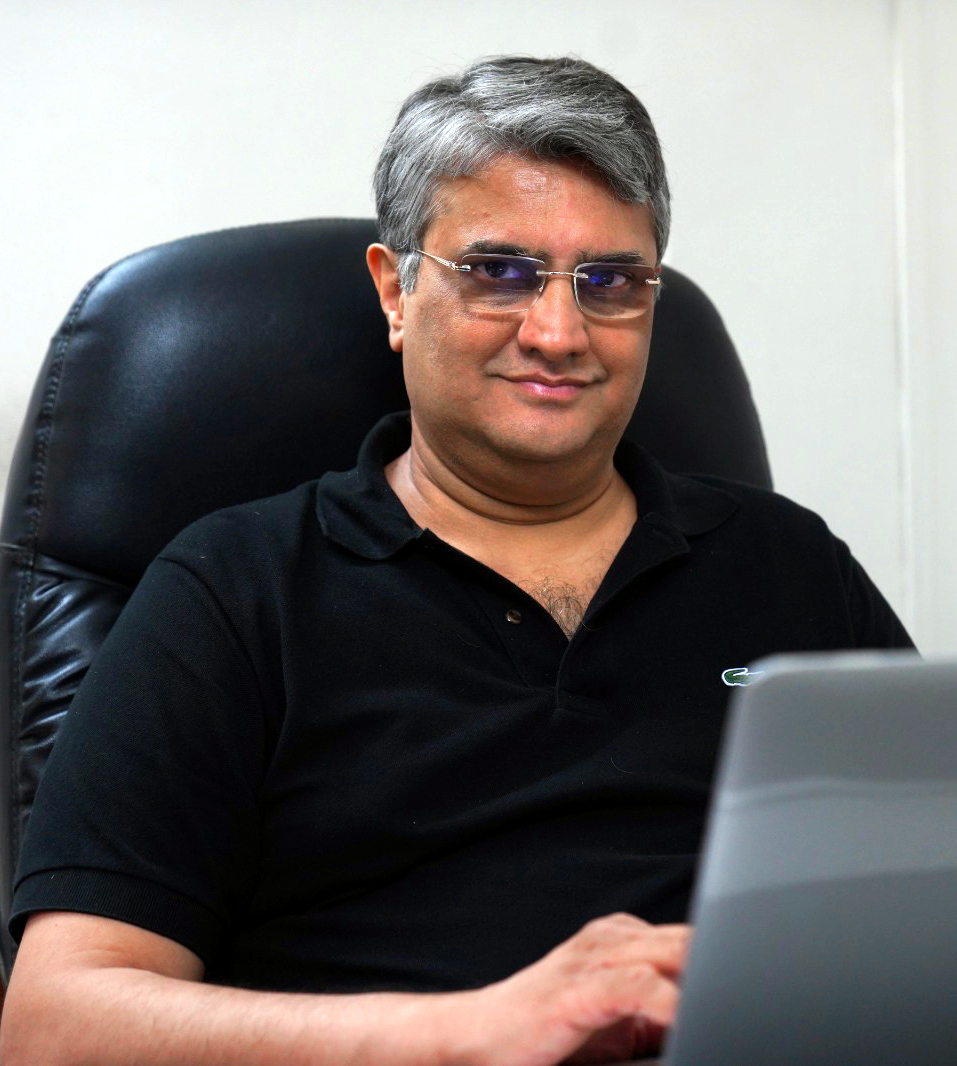
- Director Manish Gupta
- Born: 12 May 1975 (age 51); Bombay, Maharashtra, India
- Occupations: Film director and screenwriter
- Years active: 2005 – present

Manish Gupta is a film director and writer in the Indian film industry.

As a director, Manish has directed the movies One Friday Night (2023), 420 IPC (2021), Rahasya (2015), Hostel (2011), The Stoneman Murders (2009) and Darna Zaroori Hai (2006).

As a writer, Manish has written the screenplay and dialogues for the movies Sarkar (2005) and Section 375 (2019).

== Career ==
Manish Gupta started his career as a screenwriter with Amitabh Bachchan-starrer Sarkar. He received nominations for the screenplay and dialogues of Sarkar.

Manish debuted as a director with Darna Zaroori Hai (2006) in which there were six different stories and a separate director for each story. Manish directed the main story titled ‘Grandma narrates stories to five children’.

Manish's next film as director was The Stoneman Murders (2009) starring Kay Kay Menon and Arbaaz Khan, based on the Stoneman killings that shook Bombay in 1983.

After that, Manish directed Hostel (2011) about students' deaths due to ragging (hazing) inside college hostels. Manish was felicitated for making this socially relevant film by the then President of India, Ms. Pratibha Patil.

Manish's next film as director was Rahasya (2015) based on the Aarushi Talwar murder case, starring Kay Kay Menon, Tisca Chopra and Ashish Vidyarthi.

Manish's next film was the 2019 film Section 375, a courtroom drama about a fake rape case, which took Manish three years to research and script. For his script of Section 375, Manish was nominated for a Filmfare award under the Best Screenplay category at the 65th Filmfare Awards 2020.

Manish's next film 420 IPC was a courtroom drama about an economics offence. The film starring Vinay Pathak, Ranvir Shorey, Gul Panag and Rohan Vinod Mehra released in 2021 on the OTT platform ZEE5. The film was featured in Forbes list of the five best film/series in 2021.

Manish's latest release was One Friday Night starring Raveena Tandon. The film's released on the OTT platform JIO Cinema in 2023.

Manish specializes in writing and directing suspense dramas that incorporate details from real cases.

== Filmography ==
=== Director ===
- Darna Zaroori Hai (2006)
- The Stoneman Murders (2009)
- Hostel (2011)
- Rahasya (2015)
- 420 IPC (2021)
- One Friday Night (2023)

=== Screenplay and Dialogues ===
- Sarkar (2005)
- Section 375 (2019)
