= Neeraj Ghaywan =

Indian director

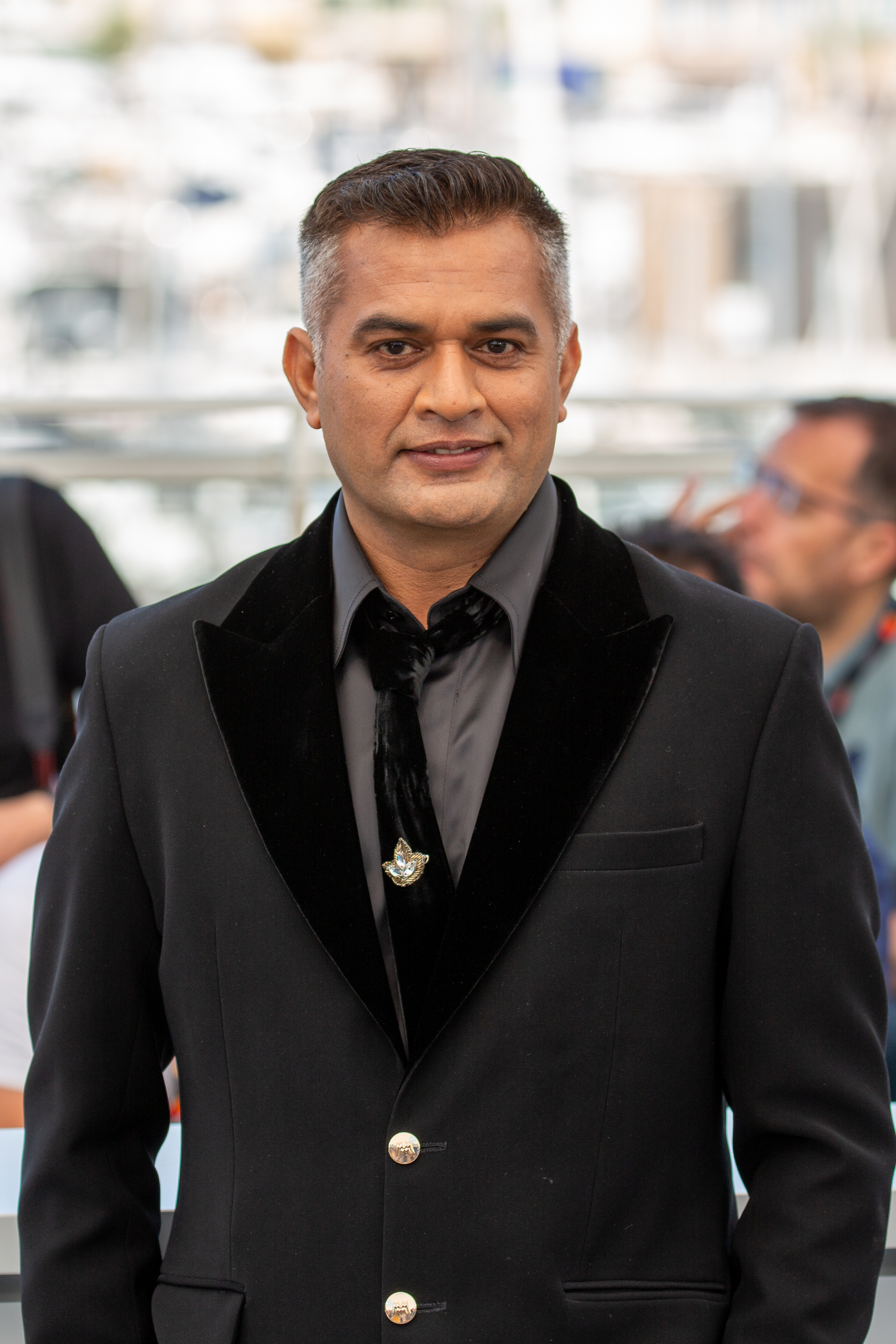
- Ghaywan at the 2025 Cannes Film Festival
- Born: 1980 (age 45–46); Hyderabad, Andhra Pradesh, (now Telangana), India
- Occupations: Director, screenwriter
- Years active: 2010–present

Neeraj Ghaywan (born 1980) is an Indian film director and writer who works in Hindi films. He has received several accolades, including a National film Award and two Filmfare Awards.

Ghaywan assisted filmmaker Anurag Kashyap on Gangs of Wasseypur (2012) and Ugly (2013) before he made his directorial debut in 2015 with Masaan which received wide acclaim and won two prizes at the Cannes Film Festival including the FIPRESCI prize. His acclaimed 2017 short film Juice won him the Filmfare Award for Best Short Film-Fiction. Ghaywan then co-directed the second season of Netflix's series Sacred Games with Kashyap in 2019 and Geeli Pucchi from the anthology film Ajeeb Daastaans in 2021.

== Early life and education ==
Neeraj Ghaywan, was born in 1980 to a Dalit Marathi family from Maharashtra and was brought up in Hyderabad. His father was a research scientist, and mother ran a garment store. He did his schooling from Kendriya Vidyalaya Shivrampally (National Police Academy). After completing his degree in Electrical Engineering from Chaitanya Bharathi Institute of Technology, Hyderabad, in 2002, he did his MBA in Marketing from Symbiosis Institute of Business Management, Pune.

== Career ==
=== 2010-2013: Career beginnings ===
After completing his graduation, Ghaywan worked as an engineer in UTV New Media, Hindustan Times and Tech Mahindra. Dissatisfied with his career in the corporate world, he started writing as a film critic for the now defunct web portal Passionforcinema.com. According to him, that interest grew into passion that was eventually encouraged by director Anurag Kashyap. He made his first short film, Independence that was shortlisted for the In Competition section of PFCOne, an online one-minute film festival, in 2010. Ghaywan then assisted Kashyap in the making of Gangs of Wasseypur (2012) and Ugly (2013), directing two short films in the meanwhile, Shor and Epiphany. Ghaywan recalls fond memories of working with Kashyap, whom he considers as his mentor.

=== 2014-2019: Masaan and critical acclaim ===
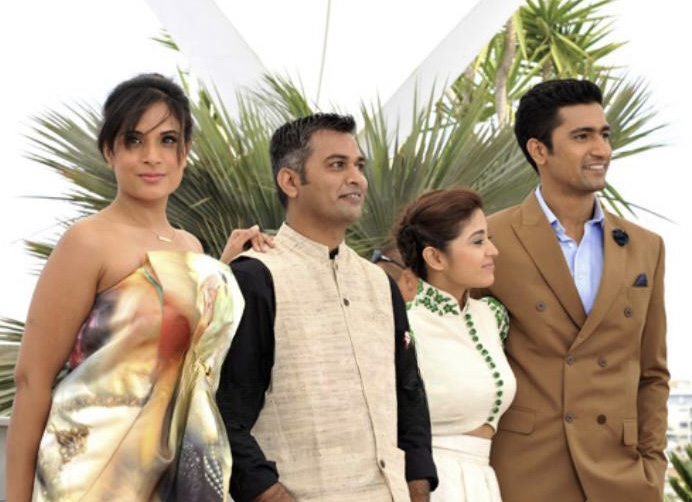
Ghaywan with the cast of Masaan; Richa Chadda, Shweta Tripathi and Vicky Kaushal at the 2015 Cannes Film Festival

In January 2014, a screenplay he co-wrote with Varun Grover called Fly Away Solo was awarded the Sundance Institute/Mahindra Global Filmmaking Award. He then made a motion picture based on it, Masaan in 2015. The film received overwhelming acclaim from critics, the mainstream media and audience alike. On the review aggregator website Rotten Tomatoes, it holds an approval rating of 92% based on 13 reviews. The New York Times considered it to be a leading example of increased realism in Indian cinema. The film was screened in the Un Certain Regard segment at the 2015 Cannes Film Festival, where it won two awards, including the FIPRESCI Prize and has since gone on to achieve a cult status. Ghaywan received the Indira Gandhi Award for the Best Debut Film of a director at the 63rd National Film Awards. He made his first commercial in 2016 for British Airways.

Ghaywan wrote and directed his third short film Juice on gender politics of middle class Indian households starring Shefali Shah in 2017. The film received the Filmfare Award for Best Short Film-Fiction that year. In 2019, Ghaywan replaced Vikramaditya Motwane as co-director alongside Anurag Kashyap for the second season of Netflix's highly acclaimed series Sacred Games.

=== 2020-present ===
Ajeeb Daastaans, an anthology film, was his next directorial venture. It consisted of four short films made by four directors. Produced by Karan Johar and Netflix, Ghaywan directed the third segment, titled Geeli Pucchi which featured Aditi Rao Hydari and Konkona Sen Sharma in lead roles. In a review for Hindustan Times, Rohan Nahar wrote, "Ghaywan addresses caste and gender politics; patriarchy and privilege. And he does this with an intense empathy for his characters, both of whom display morally questionable behaviour." He also found it remarkable that Ghaywan has been able to craft a distinctly lyrical style before having even directed his second feature film.

Ghaywan was an episodic director on the second season of Amazon Prime Video's Made in Heaven. The series, which has found major success with streaming audiences and critics, had its season 2 debut in August 2023. The show is a departure from the stylistic themes of his previous work, with a lavish look and feel set against the backdrop of big Indian weddings.

== Filmography ==
=== Short films ===
Year	Title	Director	Writer	Notes	Ref.
2013	The Epiphany	Yes	Yes	Online release	
2017	Juice	Yes	Yes	Won two Filmfare Short Film Awards	

=== Anthology films ===
Year	Title	Director	Writer	Notes	Ref.
2013	Shorts	Yes	Yes	Segment: Shor	
2021	Ajeeb Daastaans	Yes	Yes	Segment: Geeli Pucchi	

=== Feature films ===
Year	Title	Director	Writer	Ref.
2015	Masaan	Yes	No	
2025	Homebound	Yes	Yes	

=== Television ===
Year	Title	Director	Writer	Notes	Ref.
2019	Sacred Games	Yes	No	8 episodes	
2023	Made in Heaven	Yes	No	2 episodes	

== Awards ==
Year	Award	Film	Category	Result	Ref.
2015	Cannes Film Festival	Masaan	Caméra d'Or	Nominated	
2015	Cannes Film Festival	Masaan	Un Certain Regard Award	Nominated	
2015	Cannes Film Festival	Masaan	FIPRESCI Prize	Won	
2015	Cannes Film Festival	Masaan	Un Certain Regard Special Prize	Won	
2025	Cannes Film Festival	Homebound	Un Certain Regard Award	Nominated	
2016	Filmfare Awards	Masaan	Best Debut Director	Won	
2018	Filmfare Awards	Juice	Best Short Film - Fiction	Won	
2016	National Film Awards	Masaan	Best Debut Film of a Director	Won	
2016	Producers Guild Film Awards	Masaan	Best Debut Director	Won	
2016	Zee Cine Awards	Masaan	Most Promising Director	Won	
