= Raman Raghav =

Indian serial killer

- Mug shot of Raghav
- Born: Raghava; 1929; Tinnevelly, Madras Presidency, British India (now Tirunelveli, Tamil Nadu, India)
- Died: 7 April 1995 (aged 65–66); Yerawada Central Jail, Maharashtra, India
- Other names: The Ripper; Sindhi Dalwai; Talwai; Anna; Thambi; Veluswami; Psycho Raman
- Status: Deceased
- Conviction: Murder
- Penalty: Death; commuted to life imprisonment

Details
- Victims: 41
- Span of crimes: 1965–1968
- Country: India
- State: Maharashtra
- Date apprehended: 27 August 1968
- Imprisoned at: Yerawada Jail

Raman Raghav, also known as Sindhi Talwai, Anna, Thambi, and Veluswami, was a serial killer active during the mid-1960s. Raghav went on a killing spree for over three years, with the first round of murders taking place in 1965 and 1966 when 19 people were attacked, and a second round of killings taking place in 1968. He was caught by Maharashtra Police on 27 August. Raghav was spared a death sentence due to mental illness, and was subsequently sentenced to life imprisonment; he died in hospital while in prison custody in 1995.

== Serial killer ==
A series of murders occurred on the outskirts of Mumbai in August 1968. Pavement dwellers and homeless were bludgeoned to death while they slept. All the murders took place at night and were committed using a hard, blunt object. A similar series of murders had taken place a few years earlier (1965–66) in the Eastern suburbs of Mumbai with as many as 19 people being attacked, with 9 dying.

Police suspected Raman Raghav and arrested him. A homeless man, he had past mentions in the police files and spent five years in prison for robbery. As no solid evidence could be found against him for the new set of crimes, the police let him go. When the killer struck again in 1968, the police launched a manhunt for him. Ramakant Kulkarni, then the Deputy Commissioner of Police CID (Crime) took over the investigation and spearheaded a massive combing operation in the city. In this attempt, the police were successful in arresting him.

In his confession, he admitted that he had murdered 41 people in 1966 along the GIP (Great Indian Peninsular Railway as the Central Railway (India) was then known) line and almost a dozen in 1968 in the suburbs. It is suspected that he killed more. During his killings, many lived in fear in Mumbai with inhabitants of slums and apartments fearing sleeping in public or with open windows and balconies.

== Arrest ==
Sub-inspector of police Alex Fialho recognized Raghav from obtained reports and descriptions from those who had seen him. Fialho searched for him and detained him with the help of two respectable witnesses from the area. He claimed to be Raman Raghav, but old records disclosed that he had several aliases including "Sindhi Dalwai", "Talwai", "Anna", "Thambi", and "Veluswami". The bush shirt and the khaki shorts that he had been wearing were bloodstained and his shoes were extremely muddy. His fingerprints matched with those on record and confirmed that he was Raman Raghav alias "Sindhi Dalwai". He was arrested under section 302 Indian Penal Code on the charge of murder of two persons; Lalchand Jagannat Yadav and Dular Jaggi Yadav at Chinchawli village, Malad, Greater Bombay.

== Investigation and trial ==
The preliminary trial was held in the court of the Additional Chief Presidency Magistrate. For a long time, Raghav refused to answer questions. However, he began to answer their questions after the police fulfilled his request for dishes of chicken to eat. He then gave a detailed statement, describing his weapon, and his modus operandi. After this the case was committed to Sessions court, Mumbai.

When the trial started in the court of Additional Session Judge, Mumbai on 2 June 1969, the counsel for defence made an application that the accused was incapable of defending himself on account of unsoundness of mind and he also submitted that even at the time of committing the alleged offences the accused was of unsound mind and incapable of knowing the nature of his acts or that they were contrary to the law.

Raman confessed to committing 41 murders. Post his confession, he took the police force on a citywide tour to show the places he operated in and to obtain the rod he had hidden in the northern suburbs. The accused was therefore sent to the Police Surgeon, Mumbai, who observed him from 28 June 1969 to 23 July 1969 and opined that,

The accused is neither suffering from psychosis nor mentally retarded. His memory is sound, his intelligence average and [he] is aware of the nature and purpose of his acts. He is able to understand the nature and object of the proceedings against him and [is] not certifiably insane.

With this medical opinion, the trial proceeded. The accused pleaded guilty. During the trial, a psychiatrist of Nair Hospital, Mumbai was cited as a defence witness. He had interviewed the accused in Arthur Road Prison on 5 August 1969 and gave evidence that the accused was suffering from Chronic paranoid schizophrenia for a long time and was therefore unable to understand that his actions were contrary to law. He was visiting the churches near by to seek forgivness. He once said whatever I do Jesus will forgive me.

In defence, it was said, "The accused did commit the act of killing with which he is charged. He knew the nature of the act, viz. killing human beings, but did not know, whether it was wrong or contrary to law". The Additional Sessions Judge, Mumbai, held the accused guilty of the charge of murder and sentenced him to death. Raman declined to appeal. Before confirming the sentence, the High Court of Mumbai ordered that the Surgeon General of Mumbai should constitute a Special Medical Board of three psychiatrists to determine whether the accused was of unsound mind and, secondly, whether in consequence of his unsoundness of mind, he was incapable of making his defence.

The members of the Special Medical Board interviewed Raman on five occasions for about two hours each time. In their final interview when they bade him goodbye and attempted to shake hands with him, he refused to do so saying that he was a representative of 'Kanoon' (Law) who would not touch people belonging to this wicked world. The examination report found:

Throughout the five interviews he showed ideas of reference and fixed and systematized delusions of persecution and grandeur. The delusions which the accused experienced were as follows:

- That there are two distinct worlds; the world of 'Kanoon' and this world in which he lived.
- A fixed and unshakable belief that people were trying to change his sex, but that they are not successful, because he was a representative of 'Kanoon'.
- A fixed and unshakable belief that he is a power or 'Shakti'.
- A firm belief that other people are trying to put homosexual temptations in his way so that he may succumb and get converted to a woman.
- That homosexual intercourse would convert him into a woman.
- That he was "101 percent man". He kept on repeating this.
- A belief that the government brought him to Mumbai to commit thefts and made him commit criminal acts.
- An unshakable belief that there are three governments in the country - the Akbar Government, the British Government, and the Congress Government and that these Governments are trying to persecute him and put temptations before him.

== Verdict and death ==
Raghav was found guilty and sentenced to death on 13 August 1969. Prior to confirming his sentence, psychiatrists determined he was not mentally sane. On 4 August 1987 Raghav's sentence was reduced to life imprisonment because he was found to be incurably mentally ill. He was sent to Yerwada Central Jail, Pune and was under treatment at the Central Institute of Mental Health and Research.

On 7 April 1995 Raghav died at Sassoon Hospital due to kidney failure.

== In popular culture ==
- Director Sriram Raghavan directed a 70-minute feature film on Raghav titled Raman Raghav - A City, A Killer, starring Raghubir Yadav as the killer.
- The 1978 Tamil film Sigappu Rojakkal was reportedly loosely based on Raghav.
- Raman Raghav 2.0, a Bollywood film, is about a fictional serial killer who cites Raman Raghav as his inspiration, directed by Anurag Kashyap and starring Nawazuddin Siddiqui in the titular role. It premiered at the 2016 Cannes Directors' Fortnight and was released worldwide on 24 June 2016.

== See also ==
- Auto Shankar
- Charles Shobraj
- Noida serial murders
- Stoneman

== Sources ==
- Ramakant Kulkarni, Footprints on the Sands of Crime, MacMillan India (2004); ISBN 978-1-4039-2361-5
