= One Friday Night =

2023 Hindi film

- Release poster
- Directed by: Manish Gupta
- Written by: Manish Gupta; Zuhaebb; Ramesh Rabindranath.
- Produced by: Jio Studios; Jyoti Deshpande; Manish Trehan
- Starring: Raveena Tandon; Milind Soman; Vidhi Chitalia
- Cinematography: Binendra Menon
- Edited by: Archit D Rastogi
- Music by: Goyell Saab
- Production companies: Jio Studios; Click On RM
- Distributed by: JioCinema
- Release date: 28 July 2023
- Running time: 92 minutes
- Country: India
- Language: Hindi

One Friday Night is a 2023 Hindi-language suspense thriller film directed by Manish Gupta starring Raveena Tandon, Milind Soman and Vidhi Chitalia, produced by Jio Studios. The film had a direct-to-OTT release on JioCinema on 28 July 2023.

One Friday Night is the first film in which Raveena Tandon and Milind Soman have been paired opposite each other. Vidhi Chitalia was earlier seen in Manish Gupta’s 420 IPC in a supporting role. Impressed with her acting skills, the director decided to cast her as the leading lady alongside Raveena Tandon. The director describes One Friday Night as "A relationship drama that’s plotted like a Hitchcock-esque suspense thriller…"

One Friday Night was shot in 25 days in the monsoon months of July and August on an isolated hilltop at the shores of Pawna lake. The director filmed many scenes in natural rain to create a feeling of realism.

== Plot ==
Business tycoon Ram Verma (Milind Soman) and his gynaecologist wife Dr Lata Verma (Raveena Tandon) are happily married for 20 years. But they do not have children. Unknown to his wife, Ram has an extramarital affair with a young dancer named Nirosha Patel(Vidhi Chitalia). He takes Nirosha to his farmhouse telling Lata that he's going to Nagpur on business purpose. Before they reach the farmhouse it starts heavily pouring that soon leads to a flood like condition. Upon reaching the farmhouse Nirosha calls her mother and learns from her that she's in dire need for money. Nirosha requests Ram to lend her the money. In reply Ram opens a chest that is full of currency notes and says that all this money now belongs to her.

Lata learns from TV news that Nagpur is heavily flooded and all the offices are closed. She rings up Ram to know the exact situation there. In the meantime Nirosha reveals that she's two months pregnant. Ram feels ecstatic to know that he's going to be a father for the first time and expresses his wish to keep the baby. The farmhouse servant Govind overhears their conversation and his face shows silent disapproval. Ram wants to celebrate this occasion with his favourite pastries. He tells Govind to take his car and go to the market which was 40 km away, to buy pastries. Govind doesn't want to leave the house in this weather but cannot disobey the master's command.

After Govind's departure Nirosha demands that Ram leave Lata and marry her so that she and their child get a normal life. Ram refuses to leave Lata or reveal his secret affair to her. Nirosha threatens to abort her child if Ram doesn't make their relationship public. At that moment Lata calls and Nirosha asks Ram to tell her everything. But Ram doesn't do so and Nirosha breaks plates in anger and frustration. Ram disconnects the call and tries to pacify Nirosha. They go to the terrace and have a playful fight. Accidentally Ram loses his balance, falls down from the terrace and gets seriously injured. A panicky Nirosha first tries to call Govind and then an ambulance but cannot call either due to poor connectivity. Ultimately she rings up Lata and asks help from her. Lata understands that her husband has cheated on her. Despite her anger and disgust she tries to call an ambulance but in vain. She decides to go to the farmhouse to treat her husband herself. In her hurry she leaves her mobile phone behind. She doesn't even inform her maid before going out.

She drives the car and reaches the farmhouse. The two women take Ram inside and Lata treats her husband. When he's stable she calls Nirosha outside and the two women have a showdown in the drawing room. Lata terms Nirosha a call girl who's after her husband's money. But Nirosha protests and says that Ram loves her and not Lata. Nirosha's mother calls and Lata threatens to tell her everything. Nirosha doesn't want to involve her mom into this and she decides to leave the house. But before she could leave Ram regains consciousness and tells Lata that Nirosha is pregnant and that he wants to marry her. Lata breaks down after this confession and decides to leave the farmhouse. She feels more devastated when Nirosha says that last month she had gone to Lata's clinic to have an abortion and it was Lata who insisted that she kept the child. Shocked by the revelation Lata flops down on the floor and requests Nirosha to make a cup of coffee for her. When Nirosha leaves for the kitchen, Lata silently enters the bedroom where Ram is sleeping now. With a heavy heart she forces a pillow on his face, suffocating him to death. Then she stuffs Nirosha's bag with the money from the chest. Then she leaves the farmhouse telling Nirosha that she will divorce Ram. She also asks her to come to her clinic for check up and promises to convince Ram into marrying her(Nirosha). Lata drives back home at the wee hours of dawn. She takes off the cctv camera from the front of her house and throws it into the public waste bin. Then she opens the bonnet of her car and disconnects a few wires making the vehicle out of order.

When Ram's body is discovered by the police Nirosha becomes the prime suspect. She tells the police that Dr Lata had been with her all night but cannot prove it. On the contrary Lata's maid and mobile network history tell that Lata never left her house that night. Her car is also out of order due to excessive rain. The servant Govind, who returned to the farmhouse after Lata's departure, denies having seen Lata on that night. Hence Lata is given a clean chit by the police. Govind's witness along with other evidences like Nirosha's pregnancy, her money stashed handbag and the broken plates proves her 'guilt'. It is proven beyond doubt that Ram had refused to marry Nirosha and hence she pushed him off the terrace and then suffocated him to death. Nirosha is convicted for the murder of Ram Verma.

== Cast ==
- Raveena Tandon as Lata Verma
- Milind Soman as Ram Verma
- Vidhi Chitalia as Nirosha (Niru)

== Releases ==
JioCinema had announced the launch of trailer on 24 July 2023 and the film released on 28 July 2023.

== Reception ==
Jyotsna Rawat of Punjab Kesari has given the film 3.5/5 stars, stating that it is a well-directed film with a good blend of romance, suspense, and twists.

Abhishek Srivastava of The Times of India stated that the film's potential is evident with its promising premise. Also he praised One Friday Night for its commendable attempt to steer clear of Bollywood clichés and melodrama.
