= Tulip Joshi =

Indian actress (born 1979)

- Joshi in 2026
- Born: 11 September 1979 (age 46); Mumbai, Maharashtra, India
- Occupation: Actress
- Years active: 2002–2015
- Relatives: Rajat Bedi (brother-in-law)

Tulip Joshi is an Indian former actress and businesswoman known for her works in Hindi, Kannada, Punjabi, Malayalam and Telugu films.

== Personal life ==
Tulip Joshi was born on 11 September 1979 in Mumbai, Maharashtra to a Gujarati Hindu father and Armenian-Lebanese Christian mother. She was a finalist at the Femina Miss India 2000.

== Career ==
Joshi made her acting debut in the 2002 film Mere Yaar Ki Shaadi Hai. She went on to star in Telugu, Malayalam, Punjabi, and Kannada films.

== Filmography ==
=== Film ===
| Year | Film | Role | Language | Notes |
|---|---|---|---|---|
| 2002 | Mere Yaar Ki Shaadi Hai | Anjali Sharma | Hindi | Credited as Sanjana |
| 2003 | Villain | | Telugu | |
| 2003 | Matrubhoomi | Kalki | Hindi | |
| 2004 | Dil Maange More | Sarah Banton | Hindi | |
| 2006 | Shoonya | Neha | Hindi | |
| 2007 | Mission 90 Days | Anitha | Malayalam | credited as Tulip Joshy |
| 2007 | Dhokha | Sarah P. Bux / Sarah Z. Khan | Hindi | |
| 2008 | Kabhi Kahin | Saudamini | Hindi | |
| 2008 | SuperStar | Mausam | Hindi | |
| 2008 | Konchem Koththaga | | Telugu | |
| 2009 | Daddy Cool | Maria | Hindi | |
| 2009 | Jag Jeondeyan De Mele | Mitro / Ekam | Punjabi | |
| 2009 | Runway | Shaina | Hindi | |
| 2010 | Super | Mandira | Kannada | |
| 2010 | Nischay Kar Apni Jeet Karoon | Sara | English | |
| 2010 | Nischay Kar Apni Jeet Karoon | Sara | Punjabi | |
| 2011 | Hostel | Payal | Hindi | |
| 2011 | Yaara o Dildaara | Dr. Aman | Punjabi | |
| 2011 | Be Careful | Kavita | Hindi | Special appearance |
| 2011 | I Am Singh | Sara Hasan | Hindi | |
| 2013 | Bachchan | Monica | Kannada | |
| 2013 | Jatt Airways | Preity | Punjabi | |
| 2014 | Jai Ho | Mrs. D’Souza | Hindi | Cameo appearance |

=== Television ===
| Year | Title | Role | Notes |
|---|---|---|---|
| 2014-2015 | Airlines | Captain Ananya Rawat | |
