= Chutney (film) =

2016 Indian short film

- Directed by: Jyoti Kapur Das
- Written by: Jyoti Kapur Das; Tisca Chopra; Avneesh Mishra
- Produced by: Tisca Chopra
- Starring: Adil Hussain; Tisca Chopra; Rasika Dugal
- Cinematography: Jay Oza
- Edited by: Monisha R Baldawa
- Release date: 2016
- Running time: 17 minutes
- Country: India
- Language: Hindi

Chutney is a 2016 Indian short film written by Jyoti Kapur Das, Tisca Chopra and Avneesh Mishra and directed by Jyoti Kapur Das. The story is situated at Model Town where Vanita played by Tisca Chopra is shown narrating a tale to a woman who, the night before, flirts with her husband at a party. The story is sweet, and spicy, just like Chutney. It is produced by Tisca Chopra; starring Adil Hussain, Tisca Chopra and Rasika Dugal. Additional cast- Sumit Gulati, Devesh Ranjan and Aakash Bharadwaj.

== Accolades ==
Year	Award	Category	Nominee/Work	Result	Ref.
2017	Filmfare Short Film Awards	Best Short Film (Fiction)	Jyoti Kapur Das	Won	
2017	Filmfare Short Film Awards	Best Actor (Female) in a Short Film	Tisca Chopra	Won	
