= Raman Raghav 2.0 =

2016 Indian film by Anurag Kashyap

- Theatrical release poster
- Directed by: Anurag Kashyap
- Written by: Anurag Kashyap
- Produced by: Anurag Kashyap; Vikas Bahl; Vikramaditya Motwane; Madhu Mantena
- Starring: Nawazuddin Siddiqui; Sobhita Dhulipala; Vicky Kaushal
- Cinematography: Jay Pinak Oza
- Edited by: Aarti Bajaj
- Music by: Ram Sampath
- Production company: Phantom Films
- Distributed by: Reliance Entertainment
- Release dates: 16 May 2016 (Cannes); 24 June 2016 (India)
- Running time: 127 minutes
- Country: India
- Language: Hindi
- Budget: ₹3.5 crore
- Box office: ₹7 crore

Raman Raghav 2.0 (released internationally as Psycho Raman) is a 2016 Indian neo-noir psychological crime thriller film written and directed by Anurag Kashyap. Produced by Kashyap, Vikramaditya Motwane, Vikas Bahl, and Madhu Mantena, the film stars Nawazuddin Siddiqui, Vicky Kaushal, and debutante Sobhita Dhulipala. It depicts in eight chapters the cat and mouse chase of serial killer Ramanna (Siddiqui) by corrupt cop Raghavan (Kaushal). Real-life killer Raman Raghav, who operated in Mumbai during the 1960s, inspired the film.

Kashyap initially wanted to make a period film about Raman Raghav, but after the commercial failure of Bombay Velvet (2015), his previous film that was also set in the 1960s, he realized that he would be unable to find financing. Abandoning the period-piece concept, he co-wrote the film with Vasan Bala, setting it in the contemporary time. The film's music was composed by Ram Sampath, and Varun Grover wrote the lyrics. Jay Oza served as the film's cinematographer and Aarti Bajaj as its editor.

Raman Raghav 2.0 premiered in the Directors' Fortnight section at the 2016 Cannes Film Festival. It also screened at the 2016 Sydney Film Festival, the Singapore International Film Festival, the Fantasia International Film Festival, Bucheon International Fantastic Film Festival, and the Indian Film Festival of Melbourne. The film was released in India on 24 June 2016, received universal critical acclaim, and proved to be a moderate commercial success, grossing over ₹70 million (US$1.1 million).

== Plot ==
In 2013, assistant commissioner of police Raghavan Amrendra Singh Umbi, a drug addict, visits a Mumbai drug dealer. However, his plan to purchase drugs is foiled—‌the dealer and another man have been murdered. Investigating the murders the next day, he receives a hammer followed by an anonymous phone call.

In 2015, a man named Ramanna surrenders to the police and confesses to killing nine people. The police believe he is giving a false confession and they detain and beat him. After escaping with the help of some local boys, Ramanna goes to the home of his sister Lakshmi, seeking food and shelter. Ramanna offends his brother-in-law with crude remarks about his sister and their childhood. After leaving the house he quickly returns and kills the couple and their son. Raghavan is among the police who later investigated the family's murder, where he finds a picture of Ramanna with Lakshmi, confirming Ramanna's involvement in the crime.

At this time, Raghavan is in a relationship with Smrutika "Simi" Naidu, a runaway from Gujarat. Simi’s father is an alcoholic, which has indirectly influenced her choice to be with Raghvan. He abuses and belittles her, leading her to have three abortions during the course of their relationship. Ramanna secretly surveils Raghavan and Simi, suggesting a link exists between the cop and the killer. This surveillance escalates into more murders when Ramanna stalks and kills Simi's maid and her husband. After these killings, Ramanna is caught by the police with assistance from an onlooker. However, Ramanna escapes from custody again and kills the man who aided his capture. Meanwhile, Raghavan pays a visit to his father, who shames him for his drug use and lack of morals. Raghavan proves to be a killer himself when he murders an African drug dealer.

That evening Raghavan picks up a woman named Ankita at a nightclub and brings her to Simi's house. Incapacitated by drugs, Raghavan is unable to perform sexually, prompting mockery from Ankita. In response he assaults her. Still enraged, he searches for the stash of drugs he keeps at the house but is unable to find it. He confronts Simi and they argue. When Simi demands he leave with Ankita, he strikes Simi; her head hits a glass table, killing her instantly.

Ankita locks herself in the bathroom and tries to call for help, but desists when Raghavan threatens and coerces her. He then clears away incriminating evidence and arranges the scene to implicate Ramanna for the murder. He retrieves a tyre iron similar to Ramanna's favored murder weapon and smashes Simi's head with it. During these preparations, Ankita escapes.

The next day Ramanna surrenders to Raghavan, giving details of the murder of Simi that only someone who was there could know. Ramanna claims a deep connection with him: each man is the missing half of the other because of their mutual amorality and willingness to kill. Ramanna also reveals his role in the two 2013 murders that opened the film and initiated this connection: he confesses to one of the killings but witnessed Raghavan kill the other man, and thus began his surveillance of the policeman. Ramanna offers to accept the charge for Simi's murder, but only if Raghavan will kill Ankita. In the final scene, Raghavan's descent into evil matches Ramanna's when he murders Ankita in her home with a tyre iron.

== Cast ==
- Nawazuddin Siddiqui as Ramanna
- Vicky Kaushal as ACP Raghavan “Raghav” Singh Umbi
- Sobhita Dhulipala as Smrutika "Simi" Naidu
- Vipin Sharma as Raghav's father
- Amruta Subhash as Lakshmi
- Ashok Lokhande as Lakshmi's husband
- Harssh A. Singh as a Sub Inspector of Police
- Mukesh Chhabra as a Loan Shark
- Anuschka Sawhney as Ankita
- Hitesh Dave as Constable Kamble
- Rajesh Jais as Farid Haq
- Kalidas Parthitan as Michael
- Rhea Pagar as Violet
- Arun Singh as Swamiji

== Production ==
=== Development ===
Raman Raghav 2.0 was inspired by the notorious serial killer Raman Raghav, who had killed several homeless people in Mumbai during the late 1960s. Bludgeoning his victims, he produced widespread panic until he was captured by the Mumbai police and confessed to 41 murders. Raghav was sentenced to death by the Bombay High Court, but his diagnosis of paranoid schizophrenia allowed his defence to claim mental incapability and gain a change of sentence to life imprisonment. He was sent to Yerawada Central Jail, where he died of kidney failure in 1988 after 19 years of incarceration.

Director Anurag Kashyap first became interested in the story of Raman Raghav in 1991, when Sriram Raghavan was making a 68-minute film about the killer titled Raman Raghav, A City, A Killer. Kashyap was drawn to the idea of a criminal who was not motivated by familiar human vices. According to him, the killer had "no moral compass or planning" to kill someone. He initially wanted to make a trilogy of period films based in Mumbai, the first of which was Bombay Velvet (2015), then a film on the Nanavati murder case after Raman Raghav 2.0. But after the commercial failure of Bombay Velvet, Kashyap realised that he would not get producers for another period film. He then set the film in contemporary time. The film on the Nanavati case did not materialise. Vasan Bala, the film's co-writer, had written a biopic about Raman Raghav. Kashyap re-wrote that script, taking inspiration from the actual murders. He created a police officer who would be the "mirror image" of the killer, as he felt it was difficult to create an honest cop in a contemporary time.

=== Casting ===
Kashyap said that Nawazuddin Siddiqui was his first casting choice for the film because of his "unimposing body". Kashyap modelled the character on Raghubir Yadav, who had portrayed Raman Raghav in Sriram Raghavan's 1991 film. Siddiqui left his home for two days without informing anyone and started to "fear himself" while preparing for the role.

Vicky Kaushal was called by Kashyap and was given two scenes to prepare in five days for the audition. Kaushal locked himself in the room and isolated himself from phone, internet and newspaper and kept repeating his lines from the scenes. He then gave the audition and was selected for the role of Raghav. Miss Earth India 2013, Sobhita Dhulipala made her acting debut with this film. She had got a call for audition from the casting director Mukesh Chhabra, where she was eventually selected.

=== Filming ===
Principal photography began in September 2015 and was completed on 22 November 2015. Kashyap wrote smaller scenes: "Normal Hindi films have [about] 70 scenes; my films have 220 scenes". He mentioned that it helped in making the film look vast as the locations kept changing. The title was decided before the script was ready. The crew employed guerrilla filmmaking technique to shoot in real locations of Mumbai. Siddiqui had to deliver a ten-minute monologue in the film. To maintain continuity, he had to be still at the same place while the camera setup was changed from different angles. As a result, he ended up speaking for 300 minutes in the same position. After the shoot, the actor experienced a blackout and could not talk for some time. Kaushal's character is shown snorting cocaine throughout the film. To make a quasi-cocaine powder, the crew used Glucon-D (brand of energy drink marketed in India containing mainly glucose with added calcium and vitamin D) and corn starch. Kaushal practised inhaling the powder for his scenes in the film.

While shooting in some unhygienic surroundings, Siddiqui fell ill and was hospitalised for five days. His wife later said that Siddiqui was repeating his dialogues from the film, while being semi-conscious on bed. Although the diagnosis showed dengue initially, he recovered quickly. He resumed shooting for the film when he was discharged. Siddiqui called the shoot a "mentally draining" experience. For a scene, the crew had to shoot it in the restricted area of the Mumbai airport which is guarded by snipers with strict instructions to shoot any infiltrator. Siddiqui was told not to move from his position and the scene was shot. The visual effects and title sequence for the film were executed by Mumbai-based VFX and animation studio, Plexus. Aarti Bajaj and Jay Pinak Oza served as the editor and director of photography respectively. Raman Raghav 2.0 was distributed by Reliance Entertainment.

== Soundtrack ==
The film's soundtrack and background score was composed by Ram Sampath, while the lyrics were penned by Varun Grover. Sona Mohapatra, Nayantara Bhatkal, Siddharth Basrur and Ram Sampath provided vocals for the album's songs. The album rights were acquired by T-Series, and it was released on 3 June 2016.

== Marketing and release ==
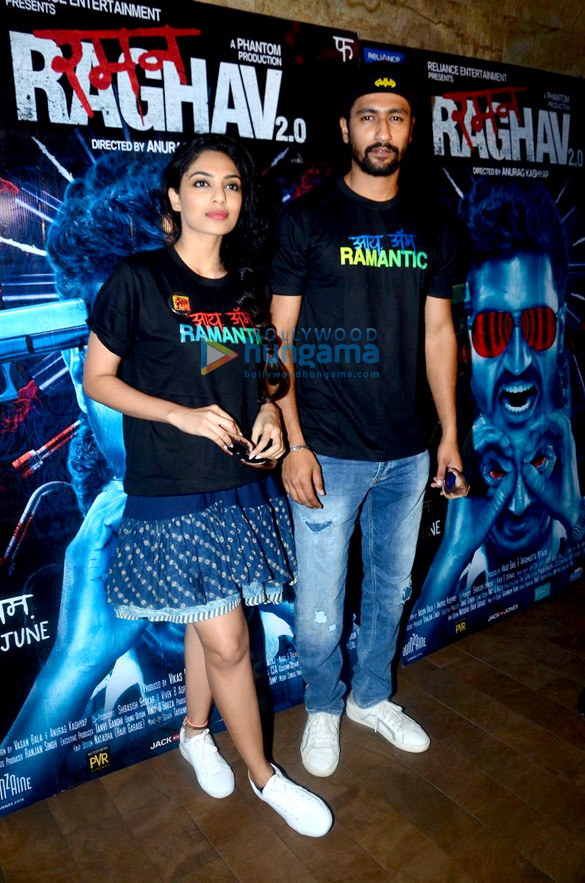
Sobhita Dhulipala and Vicky Kaushal at the special screening of 'Raman Raghav 2.0'.

On 24 April 2016, Kashyap released two teaser posters' of the film through his official Twitter account. They showed a runnel of blood and a pistol attached to a tap. The first look was revealed on 25 April 2016, which had Siddiqui staring at the fourth wall with his red eyes. A second poster was released on 1 May. The first teaser of Raman Raghav 2.0 was launched on 6 May 2016, with a runtime of 46 seconds. It was followed by three other teasers which showed a glimpse of the serial killer from the film. The theatrical trailer of Raman Raghav 2.0 was released on 10 May 2016. Before the theatrical release of the film, a series of comic strips were released showing the title character committing several crimes. A user generated song "I am Ramantic" was released online which showed people from Mumbai and other cities, who shot their ten-second videos sporting the Raman Raghav 2.0 sunglasses. The film released internationally with the title Psycho Raman.

Raman Raghav 2.0 premiered at the 2016 Cannes Film Festival, in the Directors' Fortnight section to positive response. Siddiqui received a standing ovation post the screening of the film. It also premiered at the 2016 Sydney Film Festival, the Singapore International Film Festival, the Fantasia International Film Festival, Bucheon International Fantastic Film Festival and the 2016 Indian Film Festival of Melbourne. Before the release, a special screening was held in Mumbai which was attended by actors like Kangana Ranaut, Shweta Tripathi and Abhishek Chaubey. The film was released theatrically on 24 June 2016 in 770 screens across the country. Raman Raghav 2.0 is also available on Netflix. It was released as The Mumbai Murders on 21 November 2018 in France.

== Reception ==
=== Critical reception ===
Raman Raghav 2.0 received mostly positive response from critics upon its theatrical release. Saibal Chattejee of NDTV praised the "gripping, visceral genre film", and described the villain as "a cross between No Country for Old Men's Anton Chigurh and Se7en's John Doe". Writing for The Hindu, Namrata Joshi called Raman Raghav 2.0 a "taut thriller" that "takes you on an entertainment high." Anna M. M. Vetticad praised Siddiqui for his "eerie, scary, [and] disgusting" portrayal of the serial killer, and was particularly impressed by his ability to elicit laughs "for the matter-of-fact manner in which he goes about his bloody business". Mohar Basu of The Times of India wrote, "It is crude, callous and keeps you in suspense all through". He felt that it was a difficult film to watch as it made the viewer "queasy". Aseem Chhabra shared the view of the film being a "difficult watch". Although he was critical of the film's misogyny that made it a "difficult film to admire", he praised Siddiqui's performance at his "creepiest best". Sweta Kaushal of Hindustan Times described the film as "spine-chilling" and "pure sadism".

Contrary to the positive critical reviews, Rajeev Masand felt the film "doesn't bring anything blazingly new or original to the serial killer genre." Shubhra Gupta of The Indian Express wrote that the film was "atmospheric yet hollow" and the viewers are "turned into cringing voyeurs, into reluctant participants, without redemption". Ananya Bhattacharya of India Today praised the film but felt that Dhulipala's character was the "weak link" as she "doesn't have much to do".

Among the overseas reviewers, Deborah Young of The Hollywood Reporter noted Kaushal's performance and lack of character-depth of female characters, "Variety and depth of character are badly lacking on the female front, weakening the whole film." Maitland McDonagh commented that the film performs a "surprisingly deep dive into lust, murder and violent obsession" and "delivers a couple of truly suspenseful sequences." Guy Lodge from Variety mentioned it as a "luridly absorbing serial killer thriller" and felt Siddiqui's performance has an "unblinking intensity". Wendy Ide from Screen International reviewed the film and called it a "propulsive and bloodthirsty thriller" and an "adrenalised energy which rarely flags." But he felt that the film lacks the sense of a "Manhunter-style battle of wits." Patrick Cooper of Bloody Disgusting wrote about the film, "If you only think of Bollywood when you think of Indian film, Psycho Raman will knock some sense into you, as it stands up with the grittiest American serial killer thrillers." Suprateek Chatterjee of HuffPost mentioned the film as an "exercise in empty shock value".

=== Box office ===
Raman Raghav 2.0 was made on a production budget of ₹35 million (US$360,000). Released on the same day as six other films, including Junooniyat and the Hollywood film Independence Day: Resurgence, only Raman Raghav 2.0 earned favourable reviews from the critics. It collected a total of ₹12.0 million (US$120,000) on its opening day and ₹13.6 million (US$140,000) on its second day, making a total of ₹24.6 million (US$260,000). At the end of the opening weekend, the film grossed a total of ₹39.8 million (US$410,000). Ticket sales started to fall from Monday onward with a collection of ₹5.7 million (US$59,000), followed by ₹5.3 million (US$55,000) on Tuesday, making a total of ₹58 million (US$600,000). Raman Raghav 2.0 earned ₹167.4 million (US$1.7 million) in its 10-day theatrical run. At the end of its theatrical run, the film earned a total box-office collection of ₹270 million (US$2.8 million).

=== Awards ===
Siddiqui received the Best Actor award at the Asia Pacific Screen Awards. Kashyap garnered the Europe Fantastic Film Festivals Federation Asian Award at the Bucheon International Fantastic Film Festival. Kashyap, along with Siddiqui and Bala received the official jury prizes at the Fantastic Film Festival of the University of Málaga.

== See also ==
- The Stoneman Murders
