= Villain (2003 film) =

2003 Telugu Film

- Directed by: K. S. Ravikumar
- Written by: T Sainath (Dialogues)
- Screenplay by: K. S. Ravikumar
- Story by: Yugi Sethu
- Based on: Villain (Tamil)
- Produced by: Singanamala Ramesh Babu
- Starring: Rajasekhar; Neha Dhupia; Tulip Joshi
- Cinematography: C Vijayasri
- Edited by: Kola Bhaskar
- Music by: Vidyasagar
- Production company: Kanaka Ratna Movies Pvt Ltd
- Release date: 21 November 2003
- Running time: 159 minutes
- Country: India
- Language: Telugu

Villain is a 2003 Indian Telugu-language action masala film written and directed by K. S. Ravikumar. The film stars Rajasekhar in dual roles, alongside Neha Dhupia and Tulip Joshi. The film is a remake of the director's own Tamil film of the same name, which released in the previous year. Sujatha and Vijayan reprise their respective roles while Vidyasagar, who composed the soundtrack for the original, was signed to compose the music for this film as well. This film marks the Telugu debuts of Dhupia, Joshi, and Vijayan.

== Plot ==
Siva and Vishnu are identical twins. Siva, the elder one, is a bus conductor, while Vishnu, the younger one, has a mild intellectual disability. Siva overhears his parents' plot to kill Vishnu. He runs away to another city with Vishnu and strives hard to look after him. Vijayan runs a beggar trade, and beats Vishnu brutally, handicapping him for life. Siva leaves Vishnu in a home run by a social worker. During the day, Siva works as a bus conductor, and at the same time, poses as Vishnu: to play Robin Hood and steal from the rich and corrupt. A gang assist him in these operations. He is never suspected, and so, with the stolen money, he takes care of not only Vishnu, but also 800 people in other institutions for the physically handicapped. A college student falls in love with Siva, but he later learns she is Vijayan's sister-in-law. Matters worsen when Vijayan becomes the chairman of the institute for the physically disabled. How Siva deals with the situation forms the rest of the story. Meanwhile, Neha is in love with Siva, though he is unaware of this. Later she gives up her love and lets Tulip marry Siva. So, Siva marries Tulip and Neha marries Vishnu.

== Cast ==
- Rajasekhar in a dual role as Siva and Vishnu
  - Dinesh Sha as Young Siva
  - Naresh Sha as Young Vishnu
- Neha Dhupia as Aisha
- Tulip Joshi
- Naresh as Siva's friend
- Vijayan
- Rami Reddy
- Sujatha as Siva's and Vishnu's mother
- Jeeva as Subba Rao
- Sivaji Raja
- Tirupathi Prakash
- AVS as Ramamurthy
- Siva Krishna
- Banerjee as Siva's and Vishnu's father
- Rajitha
- Ganesh as Driver
- Costumes Krishna
- Raghunatha Reddy
- Bhupinder Singh as Man with heroin
- Jenny
- Chittajalu Lakshmipati as Bus passenger
- Gautam Raju as Security guard
- Ranganath
- Duvvasi Mohan
- Ananth
- Fish Venkat
- Besant Ravi as Henchman
- Kanal Kannan as Henchman
- K. S. Ravikumar in a special appearance as himself

== Production ==
Rajasekhar watched the original Tamil version and enjoyed the film, but was initially hesitant to act in a remake. He decided to act in the remake after a member of his team encouraged him to do so. Neha Dhupia, who did an item number, in Ninne Ishtapaddanu, was signed to make her Telugu film debut with this film.

Some of the songs were filmed in Austria and Germany.

== Soundtrack ==
Vidyasagar composed the songs for the film, which he reused from the original film except for "Naa Gunde Gudilo" which was reused from Vidyasagar's own song "Un Samayal Arayil" from Tamil film Dhill (2001). Sohan Music bought the audio rights for the soundtrack. The audio launch for Villain was held on 29 October 2003. Chandrababu Naidu, then former Chief Minister of Andhra Pradesh, released the audio of the film and gave the first cassette to Pullela Gopichand, a badminton player. An event was held at Annapurna Studios in Hyderabad. During the event, Rajashekhar, the vice president of the Red Cross of Andhra Pradesh donated 50 stitching machines and wheel chairs. AVS (who is a part of the film) and Anitha handled the event.

- Panchadara Chilaka - Udit Narayan, Sadhana Sargam
- Naa Gunde Gudilo - P. Unnikrishnan, Sujatha Mohan
- Dummeyika Dulipeyyara - Karthik, Swarnalatha
- Ee Paadu Goododili - S. P. Balasubrahmanyam
- Hello Hello Mahaasaya - Tippu, Shalini Singh, Harini
- Vaadichoopo Vedichoopo - Shankar Mahadevan, Sujatha

== Release and reception ==
The film was scheduled to release on 14 November to coincide with Children's Day. Idlebrain gave the film of 2.75 out of 5 and stated how the director, K. S. Ravikumar, didn't make enough changes to the film to suit the Telugu audience. The reviewer also commented on how the first half of the film resembles Gentleman. The Full Hyderabad criticized the film and wrote how there is nothing good about the film save for Rajashekhar's performance and the twins' childhood scene.
