= Juice (2017 film) =

Indian Hindi-language Short film

- Movie poster
- Directed by: Neeraj Ghaywan
- Written by: Ranjan Chandel; Neeraj Ghaywan; Suraj Majhi
- Produced by: Lalit Prem Sharma
- Starring: Shefali Shah
- Cinematography: Raaj Binder
- Edited by: Nitin Baid
- Music by: Aloknanda Dasgupta
- Distributed by: Royal Stag Barrel Select Large Short Films
- Release date: 22 November 2017
- Running time: 15 minutes
- Country: India
- Language: Hindi

Juice is a 2017 Indian Hindi-language drama short film directed by Neeraj Ghaywan and produced by Lalit Prem Sharma. Exploring the theme of gender inequality, it stars Shefali Shah as Manju Singh, a woman who is hosting a get-together of families along with her husband Brijesh (Manish Chaudhari) during a particularly hot evening. The film released to critical acclaim for its subject, direction and particularly Shah's performance. It won two Filmfare Short Film Awards at the 63rd Filmfare Awards, including Best Short Film (Fiction) and Best Actress in a Short Film for Shah.

== Synopsis ==
On a particularly hot evening, Brijesh and Manju Singh are hosting a get-together of families. While the men stay in the living room conversing about everyday issues, the women are in the kitchen, fixing a meal for their husbands.

== Cast ==
The film's cast is as follows:

- Shefali Shah as Manju Singh
- Manish Chaudhari as Brijesh Singh
- Kiran Khoje as Parbhatiya (Maid)
- Raviza Chauhan as Rajni Shukla
- Shreedhar Dubey as Abhay Shukla
- Kanika Dang as Sarla Dubey
- Chitranjan Tripathi as Utpal Dubey
- Pubali Sanyal as Puja Sanyal
- Suman Mukhopadhyay as Shubodeep Sanyal
- Shahnawaz Pradhan as Faiz Khan

== Production ==
Ghaywan conceived the idea for the script on his own memories of watching the dynamics between men and women in his own house as a child. He said,

"I have grown up seeing in my family circles the men being sexist and misogynistic while the women would be squeezed into the kitchen. The living room has been an area of male entitlement. Women automatically take the route of the kitchen. And children see this, internalising it. I also found that popular culture looks down on housewives."

== Themes ==
Reema Roy, a scholar from Asutosh College, said Juice "exposed the misogyny hidden in the bone marrow of our male-dominated society". The journal Annals of the Romanian Society for Cell Biology asserts the film shows the "power which the patriarchy exhibits on the other" where "women are supposed to live a life of adjustment".

India Today's Nisha Singh calls the film "a commentary on how women are treated at their homes, irrespective of which strata of the society one belongs to."

== Release ==
The film was released on 22 November 2017 by Royal Stag Barrel Select Large Short Films.

== Reception ==
=== Critical response ===
Juice opened to critical acclaim and notice. Pradeep Menon wrote of the film, "It is a simple, engaging film, one that’s completely worth your time because Shefali Shah powers the film with her words as well as her silence." Kriti Tulsiani of News18 called it "a powerful short film" which provides "an unfazed if taciturn look at the normalized patriarchy and misogyny in middle-class Indian homes". According to Hindustan Times, "Neeraj creates the perfect stage for traditional misogyny almost in-built in our blood." Suresh Mathew of The Quint praised it as a "must watch film" which "takes an unyielding and cold look at the way patriarchy operates in our homes". Scroll.in noted the film's use of subtext.

Shah's lead performance won positive notice. Menon commended how she "emotes primarily through her expressions" and "makes light work of showing us her reluctant patience, her building frustration and eventual release". Tulsiani wrote that "Shah's unfazed gazes convey more than words will ever say." and further noted, "Shah is in top form and a testament to her acting prowess is a scene wherein she just leers at the sound of knife piercing into a carrot piece by piece." Mathew said, "Shefali Shah, as always, hits it out of the park with her stellar performance. Her silence speaks volumes."

== Accolades ==
Year	Award	Category	Nominee/Work	Result	Ref.
2018	Filmfare Short Film Awards	Best Short Film (Fiction)	Neeraj Ghaywan	Won	
2018	Filmfare Short Film Awards	Best Actor (Female) in a Short Film	Shefali Shah	Won	
