= Hostel (2011 film) =

- Theatrical release poster
- Directed by: Manish Gupta
- Story by: Manish Gupta
- Produced by: Vicky Tejwani; Gurpal Sachar
- Starring: Vatsal Sheth; Tulip Joshi; Mukesh Tiwari
- Cinematography: Srikanth Naroj
- Edited by: Sanjib Datta
- Music by: Virag Mishra
- Production company: Matrix Media
- Distributed by: Mirchi Movies
- Release date: 21 January 2011
- Running time: 111 minutes
- Country: India
- Language: Hindi

Hostel is a 2011 Indian Hindi-language action crime film written and directed by Manish Gupta. Inspired by true events of the abuse of newcomers to educational institutions, including the Aman Kachroo case, it follows a freshman who goes to live in a hostel and, after becoming a victim of ragging, musters the courage to fight and punish his perpetrators.

The film, starring Vatsal Sheth, Tulip Joshi and Mukesh Tiwari, was released worldwide on 21 January 2011.

== Plot ==
One night at the boys' hostel at Jaigarh University of the Satara district, a senior student Feroz and his goons harass freshman geek Vishnu Pandey, stripping him down, molesting him, and forcing him to act like a dog. His cries for help fall on deaf ears. Karan, an engineering freshman, arrives at the hostel. He meets Vishnu, Nilesh, and Bobby and befriends them. That evening, Akshay, a gang leader, tries to extort money from him in front of dozens of senior males. When Karan refuses, he is beaten, and Akshay takes him to Feroz. Feroz asks Karan to drink a glass of his urine and throws it at Karan's face when he refuses.

Vishnu tells Karan Feroz that he has deliberately been unsuccessful in his exams so that he can continue to live in luxury in the hostel and has become the general secretary by intimidating the students. He is politically well-connected and is expected to stand for local elections within a few years. Karan is refused help by the corrupt hostel warden, Sharad Saxena, who is loyal to Feroz, and Karan is beaten even more in his presence.

Feroz and his goons later ask Karan to do a striptease. When he refuses, they drag him out to the field, strip him naked in front of everyone, and mock him. He is helped by Vishnu, Nilesh, and Bobby. At the library, Karan breaks down crying as he recalls his humiliation. Science student Payal asks if he's okay, and they become friends. Feroz's sadistic activities escalate, and he starts selling drugs to students. Meanwhile, Karan and Payal fall in love.

Once, when Karan is with Payal, Karan is called by one of the goons for ragging. Karan refuses, so Akshay comes to him with a mini-gang of five. They instigate Karan by trying to harass Payal. Karan retaliates and ends up beating them all, particularly Akshay. Feroz asks Akshay to take help from a gangster of his contact. When the gangster arrives with his goons, Karan explains and convinces him that Feroz is using them. The gangster then tells Karan to contact him if he needs help. After this damage caused to his reputation by Akshay, Feroz expels Akshay from the gang and threatens him to leave the hostel within 24 hours. Feroz offers Karan Akshay's place but is declined. He tells Karan that they will no longer bother him as long as he minds his own business. Over the year, he and his goons continue to torture freshmen. Some bear it without resistance, while others leave.

After a year, a naïve and weak new freshman, Pawan, arrives. In his room, he finds the goons, with Vishnu, Nilesh, and Bobby, who have been corrupted by Feroz and are now part of his gang. They now believe that ragging results in manhood, and this strains their relationship with Karan, who befriends Pawan. One night, Feroz brings a prostitute to the hostel and asks Pawan to have unprotected sex with her to be witnessed by the entire gang and the warden. Karan interferes, saving Pawan, although he takes a beating from Feroz. He is advised by Vishnu, Nilesh, and Bobby to mind his business, but he ignores them. Later, he helps Pawan study for an exam while Feroz and his gang watch porn. When Karan leaves, Feroz and the gang, intoxicated and aroused, enter Pawan's room and rape him.

A traumatized and pantless Pawan hangs himself from the ceiling fan with blood dripping down his legs, suggesting he was sodomized. The reluctant dean, under pressure from the trustees, blames the suicide on Pawan's psychological problems. Feroz warns Karan not to go to the press or he will rape Payal like he raped Pawan. Karan breaks up with Payal and sends her away to protect her. Later, Karan procures a gun, presumably from the gangster. That night, Karan locks all the hostel gates, goes to Feroz's room, and shoots Vishnu, Bobby, Nilesh, and the warden three times each. He gets into a fight with Feroz and his goons, although he takes a vicious beating. Once he is holding the upper hand, despite the dean pleading with him not to kill Feroz as it will ruin his life, he shoots Feroz nine times and ends the gang's reign of terror over the hostel.

== Cast ==
- Vatsal Sheth as Karan
- Tulip Joshi as Payal
- Mukesh Tiwari as Feroz
- Vinamra as Pawan
- Subeer Goswamin as Vishnu
- Nirmal Soni as Bobby
- Ramesh Chandane as Nilesh
- Aarif Sheikh as Akshay
- Nagesh Bhonsle as Hostel Warden
- Yusuf Hussain as Dean
- Chandrachur Karnik as Peon Shantaram

== Development ==
The case of Aman Kachroo, a 19 year-old student who was beaten to death because he refused to given into his seniors' demands, along with the story of another student who was sexually abused by his seniors, motivated Manish Gupta to make the film. According to him, the film is "based on a string of real life incidents of ragging-related deaths and suicides." He heavily researched the subject for 17 years, along with personally interviewing many victims as well as perpetrators of ragging.

Gupta based one of the characters, a bully named Akshay, on Akshay Shere, the director of The Film Emotional Atyachar. Gupta revealed that Shere used to assist Ram Gopal Verma when Gupta was writing Sarkar, and during their conversation, he boasted of being a bully and how boys left college because of him. Gupta further added that Shere was aware and embarrassed that a character had been based on him and had requested him not to use his name in the media.

== Casting ==
Manish Gupta approached actors Shahid Kapoor, Kunal Khemu and Shreyas Talpade for the lead role, and they all felt that playing a vulnerable protagonist would not suit them. That was when Gupta approached Vatsal Sheth despite knowing he was not an A-lister.

== Soundtrack ==
The music was composed by Virag Mishra. Lyrics were penned by Virag Mishra.

=== Track listing ===
No.	Title	Lyrics	Performer(s)	Length
1.	"Hauslaah (I Wanna Live Once More)"	Virag Mishra	Shibani Kashyap, Rana Mazumdar	5:55
2.	"Heer (Electronic)"	Virag Mishra	Brijesh Shandilya	3:29
3.	"Rishta Bano"	Virag Mishra	Monali, Raaj	4:17
4.	"Bandagi"	Virag Mishra	Virag Mishra	5:51
5.	"Heer (Unplugged)"	Virag Mishra	Brijesh Shandilya, Sasha	3:26
6.	"Rishta Bano (Unplugged)"	Virag Mishra	Monali, Raaj	3:56
7.	"Bandagi (Remix)"	Virag Mishra	Rana Mazumdar, Shibani Kashyap	6:05

== Release ==
The film was initially going to release on 31 December 2010. It was later released on 21 January 2011.

== Reception ==
Taran Adarsh of Bollywood Hungama gave the film 1.5 out of 5, writing, "On the whole, HOSTEL is a solid idea gone awry." Nikhat Kazmi of The Times of India gave the film 2.5 out of 5, wtiting, "Surely, there has to be a better way to resolve the ills of the world in contemporary cinema than resort to cliches. Wish the director and story writer had found a more realistic resolution to a real problem."

== Impact ==
Manish Gupta was lauded by the then President of India, Ms. Pratibha Patil, who also promised to lend her support in taking the cause forward and suggested that the real-life victims of ragging he interviewed for the film should be given a platform to discuss their experiences. On her part, Patil said that she wanted to promote the government’s anti-ragging helpline (1800 180 5522).
