= Ghoul (miniseries) =

Indian horror television miniseries

- Series logo
- Genre: Horror; Thriller
- Created by: Patrick Graham
- Written by: Patrick Graham
- Directed by: Patrick Graham
- Starring: Radhika Apte; Manav Kaul; Ratnabali Bhattacharjee; Mahesh Balraj; S. M. Zaheer
- Theme music composer: Naren Chandavarkar; Benedict Taylor
- Country of origin: India
- Original languages: Hindi; English
- No. of seasons: 1
- No. of episodes: 3

Production
- Producers: Jason Blum; Anurag Kashyap; Ryan Turek; Vikramaditya Motwane; Michael Hogan; Kilian Kerwin; John Penotti; Suraj Gohill
- Cinematography: Jay Pinak Oza; Jay I. Patel
- Editor: Nitin Baid
- Running time: 45 mins
- Production companies: Blumhouse Productions; Phantom Films; Ivanhoe Pictures

Original release
- Network: Netflix
- Release: 24 August 2018

Ghoul is an Indian horror television miniseries based on the Arab folklore monster ghoul, and the second Netflix original from India, after Sacred Games. The series is written and directed by Patrick Graham and jointly produced by Jason Blum, Anurag Kashyap, Ryan Turek, Vikramaditya Motwane, Michael Hogan, Kilian Kerwin, John Penotti and Suraj Gohill under their respective banners Blumhouse Productions, Phantom Films and Ivanhoe Pictures.

The story is set in India in a dystopian future in which a fascist regime has come to power, and the story's main plot is the interrogation of dreaded terrorist Ali Saeed in a secret government internment camp that ignites a series of horrifying and supernatural events in the aftermath. Radhika Apte plays the main character Nida Rahim supported by Manav Kaul, Ratnabali Bhattacharjee, S. M. Zaheer, Mahesh Balraj, Rohit Pathak and Mallhar Goenka in prominent roles.

The miniseries was conceived from a dream Graham had. Originally meant to be the first of three films in a deal between three production houses, Netflix acquired the production in February 2018 after Graham felt that a longer format would be better and had it turned into a miniseries. Ghoul was released to positive reviews from critics, with praise for the performances and storyline.

== Premise ==
Nida Rahim (Radhika Apte) is a newly recruited military officer who is fiercely loyal to the authoritarian regime and will go to any length to prove her faith in the existing system in order to cleanse society for a better future. She is appointed to a covert military detention centre to interrogate Ali Saeed (Mahesh Balraj), the most feared terrorist who has been recently captured. However, he turns the tables on his interrogators, exposing their most shameful secrets. Rahim comes to the conclusion that Ali Saeed is not from this world and is possessed by some supernatural entity.

== Cast ==
- Radhika Apte as Nida Rahim
- Manav Kaul as Colonel Sunil Dacunha
- S. M. Zaheer as Shahnawaz Rahim
- Ratnabali Bhattacharjee as Major Laxmi Das
- Mahesh Balraj as Ali Saeed
- Resh Lamba as Sinister Man
- Mallhar Goenka as Subedar Babloo
- Rohit Pathak as Captain Lamba
- Robin Das as Maulvi (Muslim Cleric)
- Surender Thakur as Faulad Singh

== Development ==
Mumbai-based British filmmaker Patrick Graham, who had made a few short films, had a dream where an inmate enters a prison and manages to terrify the guards and the fellow prisoners. Graham wrote down the dream and developed it into a script. He also read several CIA documents about torture techniques used after 9/11 and at Camp X-Ray and the reports of military centres in Kashmir. He had a dream about being in an Abu Ghraib-like torture centre in Iraq. And then he thought, "‘What if an inmate came in and he was scarier than the place, scarier than the guards, scarier than the other prisoners and there’s something weird about him?" On 3 September 2014 Blumhouse Productions, Phantom Films and Ivanhoe Pictures announced a partnership deal for creating local language horror films in India. The first of three films from the partnership is Ghoul written and directed by Patrick Graham. Radhika Apte and Manav Kaul are starring in the film. Graham later felt a longer format would do more justice to the story. It was supposed to be a film and was later turned into a three episode miniseries after Netflix came on board in February 2018. Kaul called it a "blessing in disguise" as it gave them the breathing room to add a bit more backstory.

Graham said that he wanted to take a "monster from mythology that hasn't been seen before" as he felt "Zombies, vampires and werewolves have been done to death." While reading on Arabic folklore, he came across the ghoul, which he felt "fit perfectly because of its characteristics". He said that some back story for the characters was added once the film was turned into a miniseries. The dialogue was written by Kartik Krishnan. Some scenes were filmed before Phantom Films, Blumhouse Productions and Ivanhoe Pictures began talks with Netflix. Graham said he was always fascinated by dystopian futures and decided to create an "oppressive, claustrophobic story". He researched the origins of ghoul in Arabic folklore and drew on a couple of things: the Jinn mythology and how one can summon it but it may or may not be on one's side, and supernatural powers such as being able to see people's guilt and using that against them. He said that the "main bulk of the story came first, and the atmosphere we wanted to create came after." Kaul played the role of Colonel Sunil Dacunha, who is a patriotic person and has a strained relationship with his family. Apte played the role of newly appointed interrogator, Nida Rahim. Apte was drawn to Rahim's belief system, the strength of her faith, and her way of thinking, which she found to be "quite the opposite of what my way of thinking is". She also liked "her investigation into her own life".

S. M. Zaheer plays the role of Shahnawaz Rahim, who is the father of Nida Rahim. Ratnabali Bhattacharjee essays the role of Laxmi, a prejudiced interrogation officer.

== Production ==
Principal photography began in June 2016. The series was shot in 14 hours a day for over a month in a place which Apte described as a "leaky, damp, and horrible smelling place with no sunlight". Graham wrote the script in English and had the dialogues translated to Hindi. Since he is not fluent in Hindi, Graham faced some problems while filming Ghoul, as the crew consisted mostly of Hindi speakers. He talked about the scenes to actors in English and rehearsed them. He said: "I had two people sat with me at the monitors and monitor the dialogues and make sure the intonation and how things were being said sounded correct." Graham minimised the use of jump scares in the series as he felt they "diffuse tension" and so "you need to limit how often you rely on them." The cast did several one-on-one sessions and a 15-day rehearsal of scenes. Kaul did the extensive military training and also worked on how to talk, walk and hold the firearm like military personnel. Jay Oza served as the director of photography and Nitin Baid is the editor.

The location of the filming was at the Tulip Star Hotel in Mumbai. Parts of the hotel were made to look like the interrogation chamber.

== Episodes ==
No.	Title	Directed by	Written by	Original release date
1	"Out of the Smokeless Fire"	Patrick Graham	Patrick Graham	24 August 2018
The story begins in a dystopian future in India where terrorism has become prevalent and the country is in turmoil. The government has taken a strong stance against the uprising and has set up National Protection Squad (NPS) to curb terrorism. It has also set up detention facilities across the country where people with anti-government mentalities are being "rehabilitated" for "cleansing". The special force captures alive the most dreaded terrorist Ali Saeed, who, before being detained, whispers something in the team leader's ears. The story shifts one month before to Nida Rahim, a fresh NPS recruit who has a strong belief in the government policies and dreams of bringing in a better future by being a part of the system. Nida's father Shahnawaz Rahim shares a different opinion and is disgusted by the government's atrocities. When Nida and her father are harassed by govt. forces, he furiously says that the govt. must pay the price for such violence against common people. Realizing that her father has an anti-govt mindset that goes against hers, Nida alerts the officials and her father is taken away to a detainment facility. One month later, Nida, who is now an interrogation specialist trainee, gets recruited by one of the detention facilities Meghdoot 31. The head, Colonel Sunil Dacunha, tells her that based on her exceptional performance during training and the sacrifice she made by informing on her own father, she has been recruited five weeks before her training completion to interrogate Ali Saeed, who is being brought to Meghdoot 31 for questioning.
2	"The Nightmares Will Begin"	Patrick Graham	Patrick Graham	24 August 2018
Dacunha's entire team tries to get Saeed to speak but he doesn't utter a word. Nida is unable to hit Saeed and hears him calling her 'Nidu', a pet name her father used to lovingly call her. During a break, everyone in the facility gets livid dreams which emphasize guilt they have for things they have done in the past. Nida shoots her father in her dream and he appears disfigured, telling her that the price of wrongdoings will need to be paid. Once the interrogation resumes, Nida and two other veterans, Chaudhari and Gupta, try to break Saeed. The CCTV cameras and microphones malfunction and Saeed asks Chaudhari and Gupta whose plan it was to kill the Lady and her child. This causes the two to turn against each other and Gupta is stabbed by Chaudhari. Dacunha tries to interrogate Saeed on his own but Saeed starts to murmur in an unknown language. Nida brings in Maulvi, another detainee, who tells her that the language is an ancient one he doesn't recall Saeed ever learning, as he had seen Saeed grow up. Saeed starts quoting Dacunha's wife and the arguments they had, which resulted in her leaving with their daughter. Angered, Dacunha electrocutes Saeed, which leads to the power of the facility switching off. Nida asks an unconscious Saeed about her father and encounters the Ghoul. She tries to tell to everyone that Saeed is not human but a Ghoul, but nobody believes her. They call for Faulad Singh, a dreaded interrogation specialist known to go to any limit to make someone talk. Maulvi tells Nida that Saeed is indeed a Ghoul and that a Ghoul can be summoned by drawing a symbol with one's own blood; it can bite anyone's flesh and assume their identity. The episode ends with Saeed saying "It is about to begin".
3	"Reveal Their Guilt, Eat Their Flesh"	Patrick Graham	Patrick Graham	24 August 2018
After Faulad Singh enters Saeed's chamber, all other personnel leave with no one on standby as Singh apparently prefers to work in privacy. Soon after, Faulad Singh frees all the prisoners. Nida finds out that the Ghoul has decapitated Faulad and assumed his identity. Dacunha now believes Nida but most of the other officers - led by Laxmi- believe that Nida is a terrorist who has come to avenge her father's death. Nida is locked inside with the other escaped prisoners. She finds out from them that Ahmad, one of the prisoners, was innocent and mistakenly captured. Chaudhari and Gupta killed Ahmad's wife and son in front of him in a bid to make him talk, after which he became mum out of shock. Realization dawns on Nida that they are in an execution chamber, the very place her father was killed. They soon realize that one of them is the Ghoul and everyone tries to escape. The Ghoul has assumed Maulvi's identity and attacks everyone. Everyone except Nida and Ahmad get killed, though Nida is bitten by the Ghoul. The Ghoul takes Nida's identity and saves Ahmad. Laxmi tries to torture the real Nida but is killed by Dacunha. Once everyone realises that the Ghoul is real, they confine themselves in a room and wait for backup to arrive. Nida discovers that detention facilities are actually places where people with anti-govt mindsets are tortured and killed once information is extracted from them. Her father was a victim of the same and before being executed, summoned the Ghoul to make his daughter realize the truth behind the Government's facade and see the atrocities they commit in the name of patriotism. Dacunha confesses that Nida was called for Saeed's interrogation because Saeed had whispered Nida's name in an officer's ear (Episode 1). The Ghoul attacks everyone while Nida escapes the facility along with Ahmad, only to find that the place has been surrounded by the backup team. Dacunha kills the Ghoul and tries to escape but Nida kills him as punishment for all the crimes that he had committed over the years. Nida is taken into custody for the murder, where she reveals the truth about the detainment centre to the higher officials. However, it seems that everyone is aware of the torture and killings; it has been the modus operandi of the govt. since the beginning. As the officials taunt Nida that she won't be able to fight against the entire system alone and throw her into prison, it is revealed that she had kept a razor hidden inside her mouth. The episode ends with Nida preparing to make her own blood sacrifice to summon the Ghoul again.

== Marketing and release ==
The miniseries was released on 24 August 2018 by Netflix. They advertised by painting a ghoul symbol over already existing posters of Sacred Games in India. The series was screened on 22 August 2018 in Mumbai.

== Reception ==
The review aggregated website Rotten Tomatoes reported that 86% of critics have given the series a positive review based on 14 reviews, with an average rating of 6.14/10. The site's critics consensus reads: "Short, spooky, and surprisingly poignant, Ghoul's concentrated brand of horror is familiar, but effective." Sampada Sharma of The Indian Express called the series "unnerving" that "tackles social change vis a vis religion in an effective and dramatic way." Swetha Ramakrishnan of Firstpost called the series "atmospheric, partly disturbing but fully gripping." Adamya Sharma of Digit wrote: "These sort of shows demand the kind of critical thinking that audiences in India desperately need to sift invigorating content from the clutter of soap operas." Saraswati Datar of The News Minute opined: "In a global environment where regimes in India and abroad are trying to make countries 'great' again or bring back 'ache din', Ghoul sounds a warning bell of the dangerous consequences of state sponsored intolerance".

Sushant S Mohan of News18 praised Bhattacharjee and Balraj's performances and called them the "surprise package". He further called it an "innovative" series despite its predictability. Dipti Kharude of The Quint wrote: "The three-part Indian original horror miniseries may not have been successful in spinning a flawless and chilling yarn but breathes new life in the horror genre with its subversive plot." Rohan Naahar of Hindustan Times praised the series and wrote: "The elements are all there - a blazingly original idea, Jay Oza’s claustrophobic and atmospheric visuals, and a strong, simmering performance by Netflix’s favourite Indian child, Radhika Apte - but Ghoul, the show, much like its namesake demon, suffers from an identity crisis." Akhil Arora of NDTV praised Balraj's performance the pacing but felt the series is "let down by its reliance on cliched genre writing such as characters behaving stupidly for the sake of the plot or falling prey to narrative convenience towards the end to drive up the tension."

Siddhant Adlakha of IGN called it a "gloriously depraved work" and wrote: "It’s the kind of horror where security cameras and sound visualizers build to scares, rather than delivering them at a distance." Saibal Chatterjee of NDTV praised the performances of the cast and wrote that the series is "bolstered by acting of the highest quality". Kayla Kumari Upadhyay of Thrillist wrote: "[..] Ghoul pulls from Arabic folklore to craft a tense, tightly edited monster movie with a fantastic leading woman." Suhani Singh of India Today called it a "camp horror albeit not a thrilling one." Nandini Ramnath of Scroll.in felt that the "characters are as unconvincing as the treatment" and said that the series is "neither scary nor convincing". Ankur Pathak of HuffPost felt the writing was "expository" as well as the dialogues were "over-written and verbose." He however praised the background score. Alaka Sahani of The Indian Express called it "a fine example of using cross-cultural elements to aid storytelling." She further wrote: "This subversive show, can be a precursor to content that not only offer chills but also effectively deliver socially-relevant tales."

Melissa Camacho of Common Sense Media opined that the series "feels a bit uneven, with some segments focusing more on political commentary" and felt that the backstories of characters other than Nida were "rich with potential", but unexplored. She concluded: "[T]here's an interesting story here, and one that is worth the watch if you are looking for a compelling, truly scary viewing experience". Chuck Bowen of Slant felt that by converting a feature film into a miniseries, the series "constantly dips into redundant exposition, all the while eliding emotional textures that might complicate the smooth delivery of unoriginal plotting." A review carried by the IANS called it "all atmosphere, no substance". Tanul Thakur of The Wire praised the series and cited it as "cinematically rich, politically aware – that, one hopes, will set a precedent." Raja Sen wrote: "Despite compelling cinematography and very slick sound design, this is a derivative (and predictable) B-movie that has been stretched—for no reason I can think other than risking the wrath of ticket-bearing theatregoers—into a dull three-parter." The Editorial team of Thousand Miles wrote: " In short, Ghoul is a horrifying tale with a twisting plot that narrates a story magnificently deeper than the random average haunted tales."
