= Toofaan =

2021 film directed by Rakeysh Omprakash Mehra

- Official release poster
- Directed by: Rakeysh Omprakash Mehra
- Written by: Anjum Rajabali; Vijay Maurya
- Produced by: Ritesh Sidhwani; Farhan Akhtar; Rayesh Omprakash Mehra
- Starring: Farhan Akhtar; Mrunal Thakur; Paresh Rawal
- Cinematography: Jay Pinak Oza
- Edited by: Meghna Manchanda Sen
- Music by: Shankar–Ehsaan–Loy; Dub Sharma; Samuel-Akanksha; Daniel Lozinski
- Production companies: Excel Entertainment; ROMP Pictures
- Distributed by: Amazon Prime Video
- Release date: 16 July 2021
- Running time: 162 minutes
- Country: India
- Language: Hindi

Toofaan (transl. Storm) is a 2021 Indian Hindi-language sports drama film directed and co-produced by Rakeysh Omprakash Mehra. An adaptation of the 2017 Bengali film Chaamp, it stars Farhan Akhtar, Mrunal Thakur, Paresh Rawal, Supriya Pathak, Hussain Dalal, Mohan Agashe, Darshan Kumar, and Vijay Raaz. In the film, Aziz Ali is an orphaned extortionist in Dongri who beats up shopkeepers for money. He later picks up boxing and trains in the sport, earning the titular moniker on his road to fame until his downfall and subsequent redemption.

Toofaan premiered on 16 July 2021 on Amazon Prime Video.

== Plot ==
Aziz is an orphaned extortionist in Dongri who beats up shopkeepers for money. He gets into a fight and goes to a hospital, where the doctor, Ananya Prabhu criticizes him for being an extortionist and orders him out. One day, at a local boxing school, Ali comes across a video of Muhammad Ali and decides to start boxing.

He goes to Coach Narayan "Nana" Prabhu's boxing school but is defeated in a match because of his lack of technique. Nana is Ananya's father. When Ali visits the hospital again, Ananya is kinder when she learns that he was taking care of and buying gifts for orphaned children, but is shocked upon seeing him rough up a person on the street. She confronts him and asks if he wants to be a boxer or a gangster.

Ali decides to go back to Nana's boxing school after quitting his lifestyle as an extortionist and begins training. Eventually, he earns his boxing license, and starts winning matches, and is dubbed "Toofaan" by Nana. He falls in love with Ananya, and Nana angrily beats him upon finding, believing that Aziz is conning his daughter, due to Aziz, who is a Muslim, being in a relationship with a Hindu. Nana also disowns Ananya and throws her out of his house. Aziz and Ananya start looking for a home but find it difficult, due to their religious differences. The only house that they can stay in requires Aziz to return to his gangster lifestyle for his old boss, which he refuses. Instead, Ananya decides to stay in a women's hostel.

At his next boxing match, Aziz is offered a large sum of money to lose, which he does, but is later caught, and receives a five-year ban. After reconciling with Ananya, they marry, and sometime later, have a child, whom they name Myra. However, Nana stops speaking to Ananya, and does not want anything to do with his grandchild. 5 years later, Aziz is an unfit father to Myra who receives his reinstatement boxing letter, but trashes it as he does not want to return to boxing. After informing Ananya, she goes behind his back and gets his new boxing license.

On the way back, at a train station, a stampede occurs and Ananya dies. Wanting to fulfil Ananya's dream, Aziz returns to boxing and gets back in shape. Meanwhile, Nana begins to spend more time with Myra after Ananya's death. Aziz gets back in shape and wins a few matches, but in one match, the judge, Dharmesh Patil, who happens to be a former state champion whom Aziz earlier defeated, bribes the referee, causing Aziz to lose. His opponent performed a series of illegal punches, which the referee did not call out.

Nana visits Patil and secretly records him explaining what had happened. Patil is later fired from the boxing federation and Aziz is reinstated. In the final, Aziz is facing Prithvi Singh, who is known for sending his opponents to hospital before the second round can begin. Aziz starts losing, but Nana comes back to coach him and motivates him to fight for Ananya.

During the credits, Aziz wins.

== Cast ==
- Farhan Akhtar as Aziz "Ajju" Ali, an extortionist turned boxer
- Mrunal Thakur as Dr. Ananya Prabhu Ali, Aziz Ali's wife and Nana's daughter
- Paresh Rawal as Narayan "Nana" Prabhu, Aziz Ali's coach and father-in-law
- Hussain Dalal as Munna
- Mohan Agashe as Bala Kaka
- Supriya Pathak as Sister D'Souza
- Gauri Phula as Myra Sumati Aziz Ali
- Darshan Kumar as Dharmesh Patil (special appearance)
- Vijay Raaz as Jaffar Bhai (special appearance)
- Sonali Kulkarni as Sumati Prabhu (special appearance)
- Rakeysh Omprakash Mehra as IBF Secretary Anup Varma (special appearance)
- Jatin Sapru as Commentator 1 at State Championship
- RJ Anmol as Commentator 2 at State Championship
- Gaganpreet Sharma as Prithvi Singh
- Imran Rashid as Mohsin
- Deven Khote as Merchant Sir

== Production ==
Filming commenced in Dongri on 26 August 2019 and was completed in March 2020. Darshan Kumar who plays the role of boxer Dharmesh Patil was trained by Hollywood actor Will Smith's trainer Darrell Foster. Boxer Neeraj Goyat, who is himself a professional boxer trained Farhan Akhtar for his role and also acted in the film.

== Release ==
Earlier the movie screening was announced to be released on 2 October 2020, which coincided with Gandhi Jayanti. However, it got advanced to 18 September 2020, which later on was indefinitely delayed due to COVID-19 pandemic in India. On March 10, 2021 Amazon Prime Video announced that the film would be released on their platform on May 21, but was later postponed after India faced a massive 2nd wave of COVID-19. Finally, the film premiered on 16 July 2021 on Amazon Prime Video.

== Reception ==
Upon release, Toofaan received mixed reviews from the film critics, who praised Akhtar's performance but criticized the screenplay and the predictable plot of the film. On the review aggregator website Rotten Tomatoes, the film holds a rating of 50% based on 16 reviews and an average rating of 5.6/10.

Shubhra Gupta from The Indian Express gave Toofan a rating of 3.5/5 and wrote, "Toofaan is your underprivileged-underdog-to-boxing-champion tale whose arc is utterly predictable, but what makes this film such an enjoyable watch is the way it has been written and performed. You know exactly where it will go, but the journey pops with smart feints and jabs, and ends with a satisfying punch". Gautaman Bhaskaran from News 18 wrote "Farhan Akhtar is exceptional first as the Dongri 'Dada' and later as a mellowed lover, but unfortunately, the film clutters its canvas with too many issues". Anna M. M. Vetticad from the Firstpost gave Toofan a rating of 2.75/5 and described the film as "A promising – and long – tale of boxing, Islamophobia and love fizzles out in its third hour".

== Accolades ==
Award	Year	Category	Recipient	Result
67th Filmfare Awards	2022	Best Action	Allan Amin	Nominated
FOI Online Awards	2022	Playback Singer–Male	Arijit Singh–"Ananya"	Nominated

== Soundtrack ==
Toofaan

Soundtrack album by Shankar–Ehsaan–Loy, Dub Sharma, Samuel–Akanksha and Daniel Lozinski
- Released: 2 July 2021
- Genre: Feature film soundtrack
- Length: 32:39
- Language: Hindi
- Label: Zee Music Company

Official audio
- Toofaan - Full Album on YouTube

The soundtrack was composed by Shankar–Ehsaan–Loy, Dub Sharma, Samuel–Akanksha and Daniel Lozinski with lyrics written by Javed Akhtar, D'Evil and Manoj Kumar Nath.

Track listing
No.	Title	Lyrics	Music	Singer(s)	Length
1.	"Toofaan" (Title Track)	Javed Akhtar	Shankar–Ehsaan–Loy	Siddharth Mahadevan	4:39
2.	"Todun Taak"	D'Evil	Dub Sharma	D'Evil	3:07
3.	"Star Hai Tu"	Javed Akhtar	Shankar–Ehsaan–Loy	Himani Kapoor, Siddharth Mahadevan, Divya Kumar	4:34
4.	"Jo Tum Aa Gaye Ho"	Javed Akhtar, Manoj Kumar Nath	Samuel–Akanksha	Arijit Singh	3:59
5.	"Purvaiya"	Javed Akhtar	Shankar–Ehsaan–Loy	Shankar Mahadevan	4:38
6.	"Ananya"	Javed Akhtar	Shankar–Ehsaan–Loy	Arijit Singh	3:52
7.	"Dekh Toofaan Aaya Hai"	D'Evil	Shankar–Ehsaan–Loy	D'Evil	2:34
8.	"Ganpati Vandana"	Traditional	Shankar–Ehsaan–Loy	Meenal Jain, Vedanti Satyajit Prabhu	3:07
9.	"Gehre Andhere"	Javed Akhtar	Daniel Lozinski	Vishal Dadlani	2:09
Total length:					32:39

== See also ==
- List of boxing films
