= Filmfare Short Film Awards =

Annual award in India

- Awarded for: Promote and facilitate new filmmaking talent
- Country: India
- Presented by: Filmfare
- Website: Filmfare Short Film Awards 2024

The Filmfare Short Film Awards are held annually by Worldwide Media. Started in 2016, the short film awards are a part of WWM's and Filmfare's ongoing transition onto the digital platform. These awards invite first-time as well as professional filmmakers to submit their entries, following which a panel of filmmakers judges and honors them with Filmfare Awards in 6 categories.

== History ==
The Filmfare Short Film Awards were instituted by Filmfare in 2016 to recognize and celebrate emerging talent in short filmmaking. The awards aim to provide a prestigious platform for storytellers working in the short film format and are held annually alongside the main Filmfare Awards ceremony.

The awards were first announced in December 2016 via a Facebook Live stream, and the inaugural ceremony was held in January 2017 during the 62nd Filmfare Awards in Mumbai. The initiative includes categories like Best Short Film (Fiction), Best Actor (Male & Female), People’s Choice Award, and others.

== Jury selection ==
The inaugural Filmfare Short Film Awards were launched in 2016, with the first ceremony held in January 2017. The initiative aimed to spotlight the evolving medium of digital short filmmaking. The jury for the first edition featured some of the most respected voices in Indian cinema: Karan Johar, Vidya Balan, Aanand L. Rai, Kabir Khan, Zoya Akhtar, Gauri Shinde, and Meghna Gulzar.

The second edition of the Filmfare Short Film Awards continued the tradition of assembling a jury of celebrated filmmakers. The 2018 jury included Karan Johar, Nikkhil Advani, Kabir Khan, Onir, Ashwiny Iyer Tiwari, Nitesh Tiwari, and Shakun Batra.

In its third year, the Filmfare Short Film Awards expanded its jury to include not just directors but also prominent actors and writers. The 2019 panel featured Karan Johar, Kabir Khan, Vidya Balan, Urmila Matondkar, Ravi Udayawar, Nikkhil Advani, and Niranjan Iyengar.

The 2020 edition saw another dynamic jury lineup with Karan Johar, Ashwiny Iyer Tiwari, Kabir Khan, Vikramaditya Motwane, Nikkhil Advani, Onir, and Shakun Batra joining forces.

== Award categories ==
Filmfare's short film awards are given in 5 exclusive categories. 5 are adjudged by the jury, while the People's Choice Award is handed to the entry that gets the maximum public votes via Filmfare's digital platforms.

=== Current awards ===
- People's Choice Award for Best Film: since 2017
- Best Short Film (Fiction): since 2017
- Best Actor – Male: since 2017
- Best Actor – Female: since 2017
- Best Director: since 2023

=== Discontinued awards ===
- Best Short Film (Non-Fiction): (2017–2022)

== Nominations process ==
The nomination process for the Filmfare Short Film Awards begins with the submission of entries through the official Filmfare Awards platform. Once the entry window closes, all eligible submissions undergo a preliminary screening conducted by the Filmfare editorial team, in collaboration with the appointed jury. This screening process is designed to evaluate the technical and narrative quality of each film.

Following this internal review, a shortlist of 30 finalist films is curated. These selected films are then considered for recognition across five award categories. All shortlisted films are made available for both jury evaluation and public voting, ensuring a balanced representation of critical assessment and audience reception in determining the winners.

== Winners ==
Year	People's Choice Award for Best Film	Best Short Film (Fiction)	Best Short Film (Non-Fiction)	Best Actor – Male	Best Actor – Female	Best Director	Ref.
2017	Khamakha – Aarti S. Bagdi	Chutney – Jyoti Kapur Das	Matitali Kusti – Prantik Vivek Deshmukh	Manoj Bajpayee – Taandav	Tisca Chopra – Chutney	Not awarded	
2018	Anahut – Sumit Ranaware	Juice – Neeraj Ghaywan	Invisible Wings – Hari M. Mohanan	Jackie Shroff – Khujli	Shefali Shah – Juice	Not awarded	
2019	Plus Minus – Jyoti Kapur Das	Rogan Josh – Sanjeev Vig	The Soccer City – Sachin Balasaheb Suryavanshi	Hussain Dalal – Shameless	Kirti Kulhari – Maya	Not awarded	
2020	Deshi – Rohit Bapu Kamble	Bebaak – Shazia Iqbal	Village of a Lesser God – Ananth Narayan Mahadevan	Rajesh Sharma – Tindey	Sarah Hashmi – Bebaak	Not awarded	
2021	Devi – Priyanka Banerjee	Arjun – Shivraj Waichal	Backyard Wildlife Sanctuary – Nitesh Ramesh Parulekar	Arnav Abdagire – Arjun	Purti Savardekar – The First Wedding	Not awarded	
2022	Masterji – Sameer Sharma	Sorry Bhaisaab – Sumit Ghildiyal and Suman Adhikary	Varsa – Sachin Balasaheb Suryawanshi	Kumud Mishra – Itwaar	Sampa Mandal – Sapna	Not awarded	
2023	Soul-Kadhi – Sameeha Sabnis	Jahaan – Celina John	Not awarded	Manav Kaul – Phir Kabhi	Mrunal Thakur – Jahaan	Sakshi Gurnani Gray	
2024	Satya – Naveen Vijay Krishna	Deshkari – Sanjay Daiv	Not awarded	Saurabh Sachdeva – First Time	Madhura Gokarn – OCD	Jayaraj R. – Vakuppu	

== See also ==
- Bollywood
- Cinema of India
- Filmfare
- Filmfare Awards
