= Yudhra =

2024 Hindi film by Ravi Udyawar

- Theatrical release poster
- Directed by: Ravi Udyawar
- Dialogues by: Farhan Akhtar; Akshat Ghildial
- Screenplay by: Shridhar Raghavan
- Story by: Shridhar Raghavan
- Produced by: Farhan Akhtar; Ritesh Sidhwani
- Starring: Siddhant Chaturvedi; Malavika Mohanan; Raghav Juyal
- Cinematography: Jay Oza
- Edited by: Tushar Parekh; Anand Subaya
- Music by: Songs: Shankar–Ehsaan–Loy; Prem–Hardeep; Score: Sanchit Balhara and Ankit Balhara
- Production company: Excel Entertainment
- Distributed by: AA Films
- Release date: 20 September 2024
- Running time: 142 minutes
- Country: India
- Language: Hindi
- Budget: ₹50 crore
- Box office: est. ₹11.31 crore

Yudhra is a 2024 Indian Hindi-language action thriller film directed by Ravi Udyawar and produced by Excel Entertainment. The film stars Siddhant Chaturvedi, alongside Malavika Mohanan, Raghav Juyal, Gajraj Rao, Ram Kapoor, Raj Arjun and Shilpa Shukla. The soundtrack was composed by Shankar-Ehsaan-Loy and Prem-Hardeep, with musical score by Sanchit Balhara-Ankit Balhara, while cinematography was handled by Jay Oza and editing by Tushar Parekh and Anand Subaya.

Yudhra was theatrically released on 20 September 2024 to mixed reviews from critics and became a box-office bomb.

== Plot ==
Girish Dixit, an honest officer in the Mumbai Police Department, and his pregnant wife Prerana Dixit are killed in a car accident after attending a party. Despite this, Prerana gives birth to a baby boy named Yudhra. Girish's best friends and colleagues Karthik Rathore and Rehman Siddiqui take care of Yudhra, with Karthik adopting Yudhra as his own son.

Many years later, Yudhra suffers from anger issues and also has a penchant for taking risks in life, while Karthik becomes an influential politician. Yudhra's anger and penchant makes Karthik and Rehman admit Yudhra to the NCTA in Pune since they should help him channel his anger and fondness in the right way. Yudhra gets in touch with his childhood sweetheart Nikhat, Rehman's daughter. One day, Yudhra brutally thrashes some goons to protect his fellow cadet, which leads to his rustication from the NCTA. This causes a rift with Nikhat, who leaves for Portugal to study medicine.

Meanwhile, Rehman assigns Yudhra on a covert mission to infiltrate and destroy a syndicate, headed by Firoze, a crime boss. Rehman reveals that Yudhra would be sent to prison to attract the attention of Naidu, Firoze's right-hand man. Rehman reveals Firoze's involvement in Yudhra's parents’ deaths, where Yudhra agrees to the mission. As planned, Yudhra attracts Naidu's attention by silencing Naidu's rival and Naidu helps Yudhra escape from prison and gets him to meet Firoze and his son Shafiq, who were handling the country's biggest drug supply. Firoze was interested in hiring Yudhra, but Shafiq was hesitant and suspicious as Yudhra had come out of nowhere to help them.

Yudhra tells that he knows the duo are after Shamsher, who absconded from India and was a bigger threat. The initial plan is to kidnap Shamsher and keep him in Firoze's custody till he gets killed, but Yudhra kills Shamsher in order to prove his worth to Firoze and gain his trust. Yudhra is informed about a plan to get hold of a container, which contains weighing 5000 kg from China. Yudhra is supposed to safeguard the container till it reaches Mumbai, and Shafiq would handle the rest. Yudhra informs Rehman through a chatroom of an online video game. As the ship leaves the dock, the commandos attacks the ship and Yudhra attempts to save the container only to find it empty.

Yudhra gets injured in the commando attack, but he is rescued and recovers from his injuries. Firoze and Shafiq are worried until Yudhra gets captured. Shafiq and Firoze reveal that their Chinese friends has captured Rehman, who confessed to having changed the location and delivery of the container with the drugs and bribed the dock workers to help him move it to another ship. The Chinese bring a brutally beaten Rehman, who does not reveal Yudhra as the informer and the container's location, as it is stored in an encrypted password-protected file. Rehman reveals that Firoze was a police informant who was behind Sikander's death, which led Shamsher to flee from India. Rehman gets killed by Shafiq, who gets berated by Firoze as he had the details of the container. Before dying, Rehman utters a verse of the Quran.

Firoze orders his henchmen to kill Yudhra, who manages to survive and escape. Yudhra learns that Shafiq would go after Nikhat since Firoze and Shafiq believed she knows the password of the file that would direct them to the location of the container. Yudhra heads to Portugal, where Shafiq meets Nikhat and demands the password, but Yudhra rescues her and Shafiq is killed in the process. Yudhra reveals about his and Rehman's covert operation to Nikhat, who gets angry at Yudhra for his inability to save Rehman, but she still reunites with him. Yudhra soon finds that the password is actually the Quran verse, uttered by Rehman before his death, from Nikhat and opens the file, which contains a video.

In the video, Rehman reveals that the container is in Vizag port and also tells that Renuka Bharadwaj, Rehman's superior officer, is not to be trusted, as she always wanted to find about Yudhra. Rehman misled Renuka in the name of a commando mission to capture the container. However, Rehman tells in the video that Karthik might be able to help them. Yudhra and Nikhat contacts Karthik, where they return to Mumbai. Yudhra leaves Nikhat under Karthik's protection and confronts Firoze in his factory, where Firoze reveals that Karthik is also behind the death of Yudhra's parents. Karthik and Girish were assigned to take down the syndicate in Mumbai, but Karthik made a deal with Firoze to take down gangsters in Mumbai for their profit and they were forced to kill Girish, who was adamant in eradicating the syndicate.

Yudhra gets devastated and enraged upon learning this, where he soon kills Firoze. Under Karthik's orders, Renuka Bharadwaj tries to kill Nikhat, who gets shot, but Nikhat kills Renuka with electricity. Nikhat manages to survive and Yudhra admits her to the hospital. Yudhra arrives at Vizag port and confronts Karthik, where he soon kills Karthik by chocking him to death. In the aftermath, Yudhra and Nikhat head to Portugal and start a peaceful life.

== Cast ==
- Siddhant Chaturvedi as Yudhra Dixit
  - Jared as young Yudhra
- Malavika Mohanan as Nikhat Siddiqui
  - Drashti Bhanushali as young Nikhat
- Raj Arjun as Firoz
- Raghav Juyal as Shafiq firoze, Firoze's son
- Gajraj Rao as Karthik Rathore, Yudhra's adopted father
- Ram Kapoor as Rehman Siddique, Nikhat's father and Yudhra's mentor
- Shilpa Shukla as Renuka Bharadwaj
- Martin Fernandez as a masked man
- Saurabh Gokhale as Girish Dixit, Yudhra's late father
- Sharvari Deshpande as Prerna Dixit, Yudhra's late mother
- Shireesh Sharma as Commissioner Nair
- Dolly Verma as Commissioner Nair's wife
- Joao Mario as Sikander
- Anubha Arora as Shilpi
- Kabeer Bhartiya as Vinay

== Production ==
Yudhra was announced in February 2021 with Siddhant Chaturvedi and Malavika Mohanan. Principal photography commenced by August 2021. The film was shot in Portugal and Gujarat before wrapping in March 2024.

== Music ==
Yudhra

Soundtrack album by Shankar–Ehsaan–Loy and Prem–Hardeep
- Released: 17 September 2024
- Genre: Feature film soundtrack
- Length: 10:12
- Language: Hindi
- Label: Zee Music Company

Official audio
- Yudhra (Audio Jukebox) on YouTube

The music of the film is composed by Shankar–Ehsaan–Loy and Prem–Hardeep while the background score is composed by Sanchit Balhara and Ankit Balhara. Lyrics are written by Javed Akhtar and Raj Ranjodh. The first single titled "Saathiya" was released on 1 September 2024. The second single titled "Sohni Lagdi" was released on 9 September 2024. The third single titled "Hatt Jaa Baaju" was released on 12 September 2024.

No.	Title	Lyrics	Music	Singer(s)	Length
1.	"Sohni Lagdi"	Raj Ranjodh	Prem–Hardeep	Jaz Dhami, Sonna Rele	2:58
2.	"Saathiya"	Javed Akhtar	Shankar–Ehsaan–Loy	Vishal Mishra, Pratibha Singh Baghel	4:41
3.	"Hatt Jaa Baaju"	Javed Akhtar	Shankar–Ehsaan–Loy	Kelly Dlima, Vishal Dadlani, Arsh Mohammed	2:33
Total length:					10:12

== Release ==
Yudhra was released on 20 September 2024.

=== Home media ===
The satellite and digital rights were sold to Zee Network and Amazon Prime Video. The film streamed on Amazon Prime Video on 15 November 2024.

== Reception ==
Yudhra received mixed reviews from critics and audiences.

Tanmayi Savadi of Times Now gave 3.5/5 stars and wrote, "Yudhra is dark, delicious and daring in its approach. Despite familiarity, the film is engaging and tout. It’s the birth of two new action superstars – Siddhant and Raghav!." Nishad Thaivalappil of News18 gave 3/5 stars and wrote, "While Yudhra delivers on action and has a few stylish and new sequences, the plot lacks depth, relying on familiar storylines. Despite the somewhat predictable narrative, the film remains an entertaining watch, especially for those who enjoy fast-paced action thrillers with a touch of romance."

Lachmi Deb Roy of Firstpost gave 3/5 stars and wrote, "But despite its average story-telling, we cannot deny that Yudhra is one of the biggest action spectacles of the year. The intense bike chase sequences filmed across the iconic streets of Mumbai will surely give you an adrenaline rush." Renuka Vyavahare of The Times of India gave 3/5 stars and wrote, "Yudhra is technically sound. You appreciate the neurotic world building and outstanding action sequences but lacks emotional heft."

Bollywood Hungama gave 3/5 stars and wrote, "On the whole, Yudhra suffers from a routine and predictable plot but is watchable due to the direction and performances." Sana Farzeen of India Today gave 2.5/5 stars and wrote, "To sum up, Yudhra lies somewhere between an earnest effort and a missed opportunity. You try hard to like it but never fully feel invested in the chaos that's transpiring on screen."

Rishil Jogani of Pinkvilla gave 2.5/5 stars and wrote, "Yudhra has phenomenal action sequences, but the dragged and clichéd story makes the Siddhant Chaturvedi and Malavika Mohanan film an underwhelming fare." Abishek Balaji of The New Indian Express gave 2.5/5 stars and wrote, "Yudhra feels like a missed opportunity. It struggles to find a footing, lingering in the 'somewhat entertaining’ zone."

Sukanya Verma of Rediff gave 2/5 stars and wrote, "There are so many loopholes in this lazily scribbled plot, it could be a different movie and still as crummy." Shubhra Gupta of The Indian Express gave 2/5 stars and wrote, "Yudhra manages to make some resets but also succumbs to jadedness on multiple scores, so it becomes a case of coming upon a few energetic set-pieces which then sink into laxity and predictability which goes on for much too long."

Rishabh Suri of Hindustan Times wrote, "Yudhra had a lot of scope. So much potential with a great team, but the unimaginative story leaves you disappointed." Anuj Kumar of The Hindu wrote, "Ravi Udyawar, who delivered the emotionally charged Mom, knows more than a thing or two about mounting tales of revenge on the big screen and writer Sridhar Raghavan is expected to enrich action with context and subtext, but here they deliver a deep cut in their otherwise rich repertoire."

=== Box office ===
The film had an opening day box office gross of ₹4.52 crores in India. The film ended its box office run with ₹11.31 crores from worldwide collections
