= Jyoti Kapur Das =

Indian director and scriptwriter

- Occupations: Film director Screenwriter

Jyoti Kapur Das is an Indian director and scriptwriter, known for her work in Bollywood. Two of the short films that Das has written and directed have won Filmfare awards.

== Career ==
Das graduated from the Film and Television Institute of India (Editing, 1995). From 14 November 2011, she took on the position of Creative Head at Viacom18 Motion Pictures and was associated with several films including Bhaag Milkha Bhaag, Queen (2014 film), Gangs of Wasseypur and Kahaani. From 2015- 2018, she was the Creative Head at Big Synergy Productions where she was the Creative Producer & Creative Director of the web series Bose: Dead/Alive, starring Rajkumar Rao.

Chutney, a short film written and directed by Das, was released on the Large Short Films channel on YouTube in 2016. It won the first ever Filmfare award for Best Short Film award for Das as Best Director and Best Actor (Female) for the lead actor at the Filmfare awards in 2017.

in 2018, Das wrote and directed the short film Plus Minus with which YouTuber Bhuvan Bam and feature film actress Divya Dutta made their short film acting debuts. In 2019, Plus Minus won the People's Choice Award for Best Short Film at the Filmfare awards, winning Das her second Filmfare award in three years.

Das has been directing short films (which go on to be screened and win at various Film Festivals), commercials, music videos and Public Service Ads.

In 2023, she wrote and directed a feature-length Hindi Language film Tum Aaye Ho Toh (Meet. Love. Repeat.), starring popular singer Jubin Nautiyal and actor Shreya Chaudhary, supported by Nilu Kohli, Nasirr Khan, Ekavali Khanna and Santosh Singh. It was completed in 2024 and has been selected at and is also winning awards at various international film festivals, before its commercial release.
