= Tisca Chopra =

Indian actress (born 1973)

- Chopra in 2024
- Born: 1 November 1973 (age 53); Kasauli, Himachal Pradesh, India
- Education: Hindu College, Delhi
- Occupations: Actress, author and producer
- Notable work: Taare Zameen Par (2007); Firaaq (2008); Dil Toh Baccha Hai Ji (2011); Qissa (2013); The Hungry (2017); Bioscopewala (2018); Good Newwz (2019); Jugjugg Jeeyo (2022); Murder Mubarak (2024); HIT: The Third Case (2025)
- Spouse: Sanjay Chopra
- Children: 1

Tisca Chopra (born 1 November 1973) is an Indian actress, author, screenwriter, producer and film director. Her work spans mainstream Hindi cinema, independent films, television and streaming, with roles ranging from a mother struggling to understand her child’s dyslexia in Taare Zameen Par (2007) to a woman pursuing revenge in The Hungry (2017).

Chopra made her film debut opposite Ajay Devgn in Platform (1993). She gained wider recognition as Maya Awasthi in Taare Zameen Par, earning a Filmfare nomination for Best Supporting Actress. Her subsequent films include Firaaq (2008), Dil Toh Baccha Hai Ji (2011), Qissa (2013) and Rahasya (2015). On television and streaming, she has played central roles in 24 (2013), Hostages (2019) and Dahan: Raakan Ka Rahasya (2022).

Her work behind the camera includes co-writing and producing the short films Chutney (2016) and Chhuri (2017), both of which she also starred in. She made her directorial debut with the short film Rubaru (2020). She subsequently directed her first feature film, Saali Mohabbat, which premiered at the International Film Festival of India in 2024 and was released on ZEE5 in December 2025.

== Early life and education ==
Tisca Chopra was born on 1 November 1973 in Kasauli, Himachal Pradesh into a family of educationists. She grew up in Kabul, Afghanistan, as her father was posted as the principal of India International School and later moved back to Delhi. She graduated from Apeejay School, Noida, where her father was the principal. Later she studied English literature at Hindu College, University of Delhi. She also started working actively with amateur theatre. While at college, she started writing for several publications and acting in plays for an amateur theatre group and college festivals. After finishing her education, she moved to Mumbai and trained in acting with notable theatre greats Feroz Abbas Khan and Naseeruddin Shah. She is the grand-niece of the prominent Indian writer Khushwant Singh.

== Career ==
Chopra at Filmfare Awards in 2017

=== Early films and breakthrough ===
Tisca Chopra began her film career with Platform (1993). Early credits followed, including 15th August (1993), Baali Umar Ko Salaam (1994), Gunehgaar (1995), Taqdeerwala (1995) and Karobaar: The Business of Love (2000).

Over the next decade she moved between film, television and theatre. Her films from this period include Hyderabad Blues 2 (2004), Sau Jhooth Ek Sach (2005) and Cape Karma (2007). Her first stage role was Dia in Dinner with Friends.

Her breakthrough came with Aamir Khan's Taare Zameen Par (2007). She played Maya Awasthi, a mother struggling to understand her son's undiagnosed dyslexia. The role brought her wide recognition, a Stardust Award for Best Supporting Actress and a Filmfare nomination in the same category.

Nandita Das's Firaaq premiered in 2008 and reached theatres in 2009. It follows ordinary people living with the aftermath of the 2002 Gujarat riots. Around the same time she appeared in the Malayalam film Mayabazar (2008) and the Hindi comedy Mirch (2010).

=== Film roles from 2011 to 2015 ===
In Madhur Bhandarkar's Dil Toh Baccha Hai Ji (2011), Chopra played Anushka Narang, a wealthy socialite. The same year she appeared in the romantic comedy Love Breakups Zindagi and the psychological thriller 404.

Her performance in 10ml Love, a modern retelling of Shakespeare's A Midsummer Night's Dream, earned her a Best Actress nomination at the New York Indian Film Festival.

In Ankur Arora Murder Case (2013) she played Nandita Arora, a mother seeking justice after medical negligence led to her son's death. That same year she starred opposite Irrfan Khan in Anup Singh's Punjabi-language Qissa, playing Mehar in a family warped by her husband's insistence on a male heir. The film won the NETPAC Award after premiering at the Toronto International Film Festival, and it screened at the International Film Festival Rotterdam in 2014.

In Manish Gupta's Rahasya (2015), she played Dr. Aarti Mahajan in a murder investigation centred on a teenage girl's death, where the family members all become suspects. Audiences voted her Most Entertaining Actress in a Thriller at the BIG Star Entertainment Awards.

She also appeared in three regional films released in 2015: the Marathi film Highway, the Malayalam film Nirnnayakam and the Telugu film Bruce Lee: The Fighter.

=== Short films and independent cinema ===
In 2016 Chopra co-wrote, produced and acted in Chutney. She plays Vanita, a Ghaziabad housewife who gets into a dangerous situation after striking up a conversation with her husband's female acquaintance. The film won Best Short Film in Fiction at the 2017 Filmfare Short Film Awards, and Chopra took home Best Actor (Female).

She returned to the theme of marital infidelity in Chhuri (2017), directed by Mansi Jain and starring Anurag Kashyap and Surveen Chawla. Chopra co-wrote and co-produced it, and her character deals with her husband's cheating in her own way.

In Bornila Chatterjee's The Hungry (2017), a take on Shakespeare's Titus Andronicus, she played Tulsi Joshi, who fights back after her family is attacked. It premiered at the Toronto International Film Festival and later screened at the BFI London Film Festival.

During these years she also appeared in Ghayal Once Again and Sardaar Gabbar Singh (both 2016), followed by Bioscopewala, 3 Dev and Lashtam Pashtam (all 2018).

In 2020 she made her directorial debut with the short film Rubaru, which she also wrote, produced and starred in. She played an actress facing a declining career and shaken self-esteem as she tries to return to the stage.

=== Television and streaming ===
Chopra has a long list of television credits. She appeared in Star Bestsellers and in the soaps Astitva…Ek Prem Kahani, Karishma Kaa Karishma, Kahaani Ghar Ghar Kii and Sarkarr: Rishton Ki Ankahi Kahani. She also hosted Main Hoon Na on Star News and Prayschit – Gunahon Ke Zakhm on Sony Entertainment Television.

In 2013 she joined the Indian adaptation of 24, produced by Anil Kapoor and directed by Abhinay Deo. Later came the British historical series Beecham House (2019) and Ramyug (2021).

In Sudhir Mishra's Hostages (2019), she played Dr. Mira Anand, a doctor torn between her medical duties and protecting her family after they are taken hostage. In Dahan: Raakan Ka Rahasya (2022), she played Avani Raut, a district magistrate pushing a mining project forward while confronting the town's belief in an ancient curse.

She also appeared in two Hindi films, Good Newwz (2019) and Jugjugg Jeeyo (2022).

=== Feature directing and recent work ===
Chopra's first feature as director, Saali Mohabbat, was unveiled at the International Film Festival of India in 2024 and arrived on ZEE5 on December 12, 2025. She co-wrote the thriller with Sanjay Chopra. It follows a woman in a rural setting who gets tangled up in infidelity, deceit and murder.

The cast includes Radhika Apte, Divyenndu, Anurag Kashyap, Anshumaan Pushkar, Sauraseni Maitra and Sharat Saxena.

At the 2026 Jagran Film Festival, Saali Mohabbat won Best Film in the OTT category. Tisca and Sanjay Chopra were also nominated for Feature Film – Best Debut at the 2026 Screenwriters Association Awards.

As an actor, she appeared in Dono (2023), Murder Mubarak (2024) and the Telugu action thriller HIT: The Third Case (2025).

=== Writing ===
Chopra's first book, Acting Smart: Your Ticket to Showbiz, was published by HarperCollins India in 2014. Drawing on her own years in the industry, it offers aspiring actors practical advice on starting out and handling the challenges of the profession.

Her second book, What's Up With Me? (2021), is about puberty and adolescence, covering the physical and emotional changes that come with growing up.

== Personal life ==
Chopra is married to Sanjay Chopra, a commercial pilot who also writes books and screenplays. They have a daughter, Tara.

== Filmography ==
=== Films ===
Year	Title	Role	Language	Notes
1993	15th August	Kiran Solanki	Hindi	Credited as Priya Arora
1993	Platform	Tina	Hindi	Credited as Priya Arora
1993	I Love India	Priya	Tamil	Credited as Priya Arora
1994	Baali Umar Ko Salaam	Nikitha	Hindi	
1995	Gunehgaar	Priya	Hindi	
1995	Taqdeerwala	Lataa	Hindi	
1998	Dandnayak	Priya	Hindi	
2000	Karobaar: The Business of Love	Neelam	Hindi	
2004	Hyderabad Blues 2	Menaka	English, Telugu, Hindi	
2005	Sau Jhooth Ek Sach		Hindi	
2007	Cape Karma	Kamini	English	
2007	Taare Zameen Par	Maya Awasthy	Hindi	
2008	Firaaq	Anuradha Desai	Hindi	
2008	Mayabazar	Neena Kurian	Malayalam	
2010	10ml Love	Roshni	Hindi	
2010	Khushiyaan	Julie Verma	Punjabi	
2011	Dil Toh Baccha Hai Ji	Anushka Anu Narang	Hindi	
2011	404	Dr. Mira	Hindi	
2011	Love Breakups Zindagi	Sheila Thappar	Hindi	
2012	OMG: Oh My God!	Interviewer	Hindi	Special Appearance
2013	Ankur Arora Murder Case	Nanditha Arora	Hindi	
2013	Qissa	Mehar	Punjabi	
2015	Rahasya	Dr. Arthi Mahajan	Hindi	
2015	Nirnnayakam	Sreeprada	Malayalam	
2015	Highway	Film actor	Marathi	
2015	Bruce Lee - The Fighter	Malini	Telugu	
2016	Ghayal Once Again	Sheethal Bansal	Hindi	
2016	Sardaar Gabbar Singh	Geetha Devi	Telugu	
2017	The Hungry	Tulsi Joshi	Hindi	
2018	Bioscopewala	Wahida	Hindi	
2018	Lashtam Pashtam	Mother of Siddhant	Hindi	
2019	Good Newwz	Dr. Sandhya Joshi	Hindi	
2022	Jugjugg Jeeyo	Meera	Hindi	
2023	Dono	Anjali Malhotra	Hindi	
2024	Murder Mubarak	Roshni Batra	Hindi	
2025	HIT: The Third Case	ADGP Kritika Ahuja IPS	Telugu	
2025	Saali Mohabbat	—N/a	Hindi	Director
TBA	3 Dev	Savitri	Hindi	
TBA	Teesvi Manzil		Hindi	Completed

=== Television ===
Year	Title	Role	Notes
2000	Star Bestsellers	Sarla	episode "Ek Shaam Ki Mulakaat"
2002	Astitva...Ek Prem Kahani	Rhea	
2003–2004	Karishma Kaa Karishma	Sheetal (Karishma's mother)	
2004–2005	Kahaani Ghar Ghar Kii	Mallika Doshi	
2005–2006	Sarkarr:Rishton Ki Ankahi Kahani	Urvashi	
2007	Main Hoon Na	Host/presenter	
2011	Prayschit - Gunahon Ke Zakhm	Host/presenter	
2013	24	Trisha Rathod	
2018	Mariam Khan - Reporting Live	Arts Teacher	
2019	Hostages Season 1	Dr. Mira Anand	
2019	Beecham House	Empress	British television series
2021	Ramyug	Mata kaikayi	Mx Player original
2022	Dahan	Avni Raut	

=== Short films ===
Year	Title	Role	Director	Notes	Ref.
2016	Chutney	Vanita	Jyoti Kapur Das	also producer and co-writer	
2017	Chhuri	Meera	Mansi Jain	also co-producer and co-writer	
2020	Rubaru	Radha	Tisca Chopra	also director, co-producer and co-writer	

== Awards and nominations ==
Won

- People's Choice: Stardust Best Supporting Actress Award - Taare Zameen Par
- BIG Star Entertainment Awards - Best Actor (In a negative role) - Rahasya
- Tisca won the "Best Actor Female" for Chutney at the Jio Filmfare Short Film Awards 2017. It's a project she not just acted in, but also produced and co-wrote. The "Best Film" (Fiction) award also went to Chutney.
- 24, won Best Television series at The Indian Television Academy (ITA).

Nominated

- Filmfare Best Supporting Actress Award - Taare Zameen Par
- Stardust Awards - Best Actress in a Supporting Role (Female) - Firaaq
- Star Screen Awards - Best Actress in a Supporting Role (Female) - Taare Zameen Par
- V. Shantaram Awards: Best Actress in a Supporting Role - Taare Zameen Par
- Zee Cine Awards Best Actress in a Supporting Role (Female) - Taare Zameen Par
- Indian Film Festival of New York Best Actress - 10ml Love
