= Filmfare Awards =

Annual film awards in India

- Previous: 70th Filmfare Awards; 11 October 2025; Next: 71st Filmfare Awards
- The Filmfare Awards logo
- Awarded for: Excellence in Hindi cinema
- Country: India
- Presented by: Filmfare
- First award: March 21, 1954; 72 years ago
- Website: filmfare.com/awards

Television/radio coverage
- Network: Doordarshan (1987–1999); Sony Entertainment Television (2000–2017); Colors TV (2018–2023); Zee TV (2024—present)

The Filmfare Awards are perennial awards in India that honour artistic and technical excellence in Hindi cinema. The ceremony is one of the most notable film events in India. Filmfare Awards were introduced by Filmfare of The Times Group in 1954, the same year as the National Film Awards. They were called the Clare Awards, or The Clares, after Clare Mendonça, the editor of The Times of India.

From 2000, a recorded and edited version of the awards ceremony was televised on SET a week or two after the ceremony has been held. Since 2018, the ceremony has been televised on Colors. Until 2023, the function was held in Mumbai except for year 2020 when the 65th Filmfare Awards event was held on 16 February 2020 at Sarusajai Stadium, Guwahati. Until the mid-1990s, Filmfare Awards were the preeminent and most-recognised awards in Hindi film industry until several other awards sprouted up in Mumbai. This has resulted in poor viewership since the 2000s.

In addition to the flagship event, Filmfare also has variants for regional Indian film industries, such as Filmfare Awards South for South Indian cinema; Filmfare Marathi Awards for Marathi cinema; Filmfare Awards Bangla for Bengali cinema, Filmfare Awards Punjabi for Punjabi cinema; Filmfare OTT Awards for over-the-top content, Filmfare Short Film Awards for short films; and Filmfare Glamour & Style Awards.

== History ==
=== Beginnings ===
The Filmfare awards were introduced in 1954. The Clares was the original name of the award ceremony, named after The Times of India critic Clare Mendonca. Readers of Filmfare were polled to decide the winners, and over 20,000 readers spread throughout India participated in the polls; trophies were given to winners of the popular vote. In the first awards function, held on 21 March 1954 at the Metro Theatre of Mumbai, only five awards were presented: Best Film, Best Director, Best Actor, Best Actress, and Best Music Director.

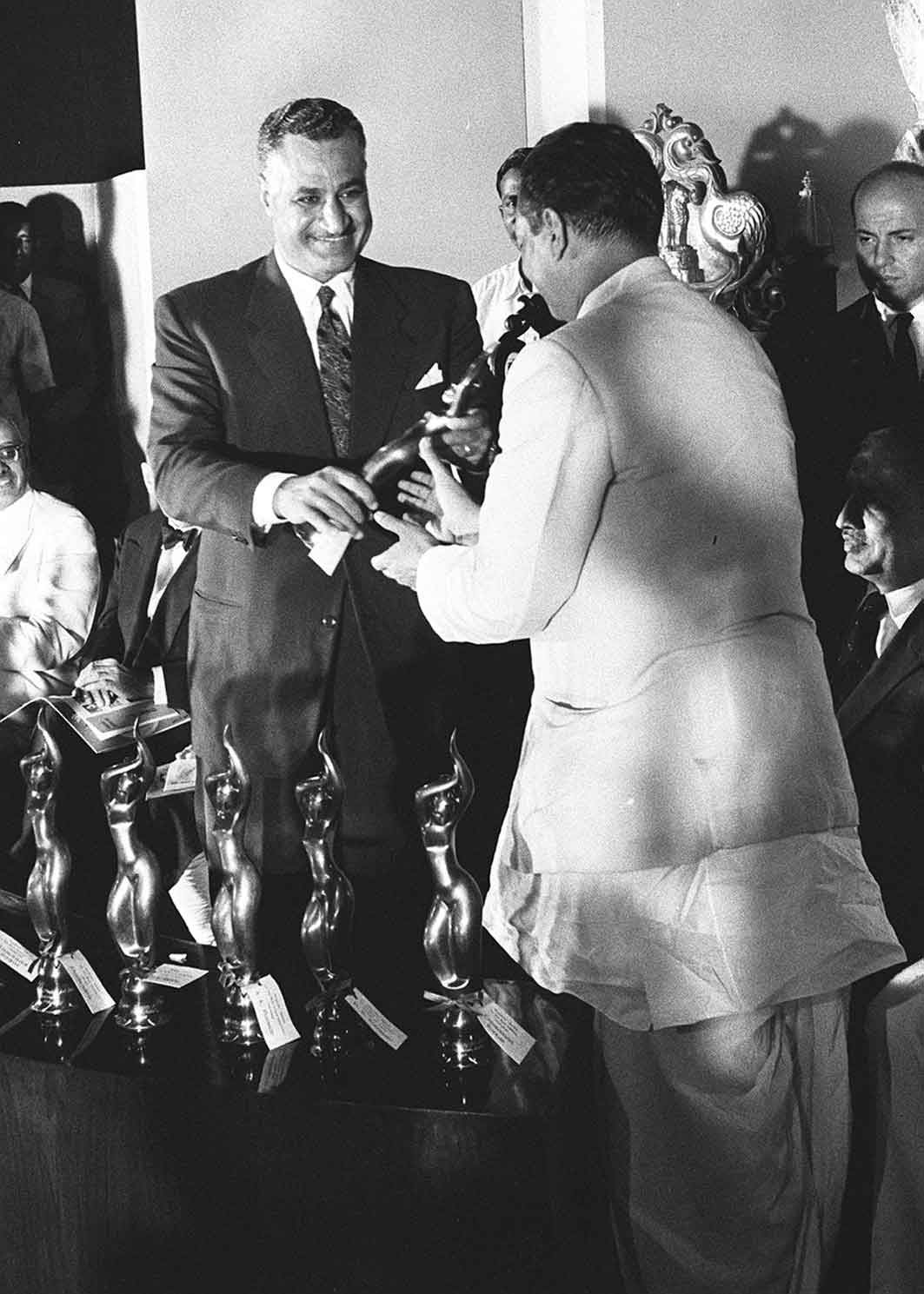
Egyptian President Gamal Abdel Nasser at the Filmfare Awards during his visit to India, March 1960.

Do Bigha Zameen was the first movie to win the award for Best Film. The first winners for the other four categories were: Bimal Roy for his direction of Do Bigha Zameen, Dilip Kumar for his performance in Daag, Meena Kumari for her performance in Baiju Bawra, and Naushad Ali for his music in Baiju Bawra. The Filmfare Awards also introduced the Short Film Category in 2017, with Vidya Balan and Gauri Shinde on the jury. The People's Choice Award for Best Short Film was presented to Khamakha. Short films like Chutney, Matitali Kusti and Taandav won awards as well.

Hollywood star Gregory Peck was invited to be the guest of honour at the first ever awards on 21 March 1954 at the Metro theatre, Mumbai but could not make it to the function since his flight from Colombo got delayed. However, Peck did attend the banquet that followed the award night at Wellington Club (Gymkhana), Mumbai.

=== Postponement in 1986 and 1987 ===
The winners for the year 1985 were announced in 1986 and the event was scheduled to be held at the Brabourne Stadium in December 1986. The Bombay Film Industry as it was known then, went on strike in 1986 because of its many contentious issues with the Government of Maharashtra. As a result, the ceremony was pushed to the next year. The winners of 1985 were awarded on 28 January 1987. For security reasons, the Filmfare was not awarded for 1986 and 1987.

=== Red carpet ===
The red carpet is a segment that takes place before the beginning of the actual ceremony. This is when actors, actresses, producers, directors, singers, composers, and others that have contributed to Indian cinema are introduced. Hosts question the celebrities about upcoming performances and who they think deserves to take the Black Lady home.

== Trophy ==
The statuette, depicting a woman whose arms are upraised in a dance number with her fingers touching, is commonly referred to as "The Black Lady" (or "The Lady in Black"). Originally designed by N.G. Pansare under the supervision of Times of India's art director Walter Langhammer, it is generally made of bronze, its height is 46.5 cm and it weighs around 5 kg. To celebrate the 25th year of the awards, the statues were made in silver and to celebrate the 50th year the statues were made in gold. The Filmfare trophy has been manufactured by The Award Gallery since 2000.

The Filmfare Trophy commonly called as The Black Lady

Until 2012, there had only been a few changes made to the trophy. But as of 2014, a huge change was made to give the trophy a 3-D look. There were two reasons given for this change. First, that the organisers believe that it was necessary to match the many advances in technology in today's world, which will advance a lot more in the coming years as well. This was also an attempt to match the theme of the 2013 set of awards at Filmfare in Mumbai: a hundred years leap into the future.

== Categories ==
=== Current categories ===
- Best Film: since 1954
- Best Director: since 1954
- Best Actor: since 1954
- Best Actress: since 1954
- Best Supporting Actor: since 1955
- Best Supporting Actress: since 1955
- Best Male Debut: since 1989
- Best Female Debut: since 1989
- Best Debut Director: since 2010
- Best Music Director: since 1954
- Best Lyricist: since 1959
- Best Male Playback Singer: since 1959
- Best Female Playback Singer: since 1959

=== Discontinued categories ===
- Best Performance in a Comic Role (1967–2007)
- Best Performance in a Negative Role (1992–2007)

== Critics' awards ==
=== Current awards ===
- Best Film Critics: since 1971
- Best Actor Critics: since 1998
- Best Actress Critics: since 1998

=== Discontinued awards ===
- Best Documentary (1967–1997)
- Filmfare Critics Award for Best Performance (1991–1997)

== Technical awards ==
- Best Story: since 1955
- Best Screenplay: since 1969
- Best Dialogue: since 1959
- Best Action: since 1993
- Best Art Direction: since 1956
- Best Background Score: since 1998
- Best Cinematography: since 1954
- Best Editing: since 1956
- Best Choreography: since 1989
- Best Sound Design: since 1955
- Best Special Effects: since 2007
- Best Costume Design: since 1995

== Special categories ==
=== Current special categories ===
- Lifetime Achievement: since 1991
- RD Burman Award for New Music Talent: since 1995
- Special Performance Award: since 1971

=== Discontinued special categories ===
- Best Scene of the Year (1998–2012)
- Power Award (2003–2007)

== Other editions ==
=== Filmfare OTT Awards ===
In 2020, Filmfare started Filmfare OTT Awards for the best in web series.

=== Filmfare Awards Punjabi ===
Filmfare Awards for Punjabi-language film industry.

=== Filmfare Awards Marathi ===
Filmfare Awards for Marathi-language film industry.

=== Filmfare Awards Bangla ===
Filmfare Awards for Bengali-language film industry.

=== Filmfare Awards South ===
Filmfare Awards for South Indian film industries.

=== Filmfare Awards East ===
Filmfare Awards for East Indian film industries. Defunct and rebranded as Filmfare Awards Bangla.

=== Filmfare Awards Bangla ===
Filmfare Awards for Bengali cinema.

=== Filmfare Short Film Awards ===
Filmfare Awards for short films.

== See also ==
- Bollywood
- Cinema of India
- List of Filmfare Award records
- Filmfare
