= Nitin Baid =

Indian film editor

- Born: Kolkata, West Bengal, India
- Education: Christ College (BA); Whistling Woods International
- Occupations: Film editor; film director; screenwriter
- Years active: 2010–present

Nitin Baid is an Indian film editor and director known for his work in Hindi cinema. He has edited films such as Masaan (2015), Trapped (2016), Raazi (2018), Bhavesh Joshi Superhero (2018), Lust Stories (2018), Gully Boy (2019), Chhapaak (2020), 83 (2021), Sam Bahadur (2023), Kesari Chapter 2 (2023) and Homebound (2025) and streaming series including Ghoul (2018), Bard of Blood (2019), Made in Heaven (2019), Dahaad (2023) and The Ba***ds of Bollywood (2025). Baid made his directorial debut with the short film Chashma (also known as Blind Spot), which premiered at the MAMI Mumbai Film Festival in 2024.

== Early life and education ==
Baid was born and raised in Kolkata, India. He initially expected to join his family's business before developing an interest in cinema. He graduated from Christ College, Bengaluru, where he first developed an interest in film editing. His passion for the craft began when a friend invited him to assist on a corporate film project during his college years. This early experience and his exposure to world cinema during these undergraduate studies played a significant role in shaping his interest in storytelling and films.

He applied to several film schools across India with the intention of studying direction, but opted for the editing programme at Whistling Woods International. He later moved to Mumbai and completed a two-year course at Whistling Woods International, a premier film institute, formalizing his training in film editing. Baid has noted that film school provided a strong technical foundation, though professional opportunities still required independent effort.

== Career ==
=== Early work ===
Baid began his film career as an assistant editor on Anurag Kashyap’s Gangs of Wasseypur (2012). The opportunity came after he spent months cold-emailing his showreel and making calls to editors, directors, and production houses in search of work. He was eventually contacted by editor Shweta Venkat, whom he had met on the set of That Girl in Yellow Boots, leading to his selection for the project.

The edit on Gangs of Wasseypur lasted over a year, giving Baid extensive exposure to the demands of large-scale, multi-character storytelling. During this period, he also edited several short films, which helped build his confidence to take on independent projects.

He transitioned to independent editing work, gaining recognition for his editing in films such as Masaan and Bhavesh Joshi Superhero.

=== Editing career ===
Baid began his professional editing journey after assisting on Gangs of Wasseypur. He moved into independent editing with Masaan (2015), a project that brought him wider recognition and led to collaborations with filmmakers such as Neeraj Ghaywan and Vikramaditya Motwane.

Baid has described Masaan as a formative experience made by a young team "carried on the shoulders of fresh talent," recalling the sense of innocence and pressure as they worked under their mentors. After returning from the Banaras shoot, the team briefly felt they had "made the worst film on the planet," a fear that he says ultimately pushed them to work harder and trust the process.

Following Masaan, Baid edited films including Bhavesh Joshi Superhero (2018) and the espionage drama Raazi (2018), where his work contributed to the film's tightly paced structure. Raazi marked his first major commercial venture in terms of scale and budget. Baid received weekly raw footage during the shoot and assembled sequences—including the film's climax—within days of filming. He has noted that the shoot was often chaotic due to the use of multiple cameras, and praised director Meghna Gulzar for her meticulous and decisive approach to editing decisions.

He gained further prominence with Gully Boy (2019), shaping the musical and emotional rhythm of the film as it moved between performance sequences and character-driven scenes. Baid came onboard the film after a scheduling conflict with Zoya Akhtar’s initial editor. The edit involved extensive restructuring, including reordering narrative beats and removing small portions from numerous scenes. He and Akhtar spent three months working abroad solely on the edit. At poet-lyricist Javed Akhtar’s suggestion, certain sequences—such as the protagonist's breakdown during a rap battle—were repositioned to strengthen the dramatic arc. Baid has also noted that the climax was reworked to avoid repetitive "high points," with "The Train Song" ultimately moved to the film's ending.

Throughout the late 2010s and early 2020s, Baid established ongoing associations with several major directors, working on projects such as The Archies, '83, and Karan Johar’s Rocky Aur Rani Kii Prem Kahaani. He edited Gunjan Saxena: The Kargil Girl (2020), a film noted for its emphasis on a father–daughter relationship within a military setting, and was involved in shaping its combination of emotional and large-scale aviation sequences. His editing during this period ranged from large-scale commercial storytelling to more grounded social dramas.

Baid also edited Kabir Khan’s 83 (2021). He initially declined the project due to scheduling conflicts but later joined after timelines shifted. The majority of the film's edit was completed before the COVID-19 lockdown, and Baid has described the project as a significant historical sports narrative in contemporary Hindi cinema.

In addition to feature films, Baid has been active in the streaming space, editing series including Dahaad, Made in Heaven. He has noted that the rise of OTT platforms has introduced faster post-production timelines and data-driven expectations for audience engagement. Baid's work is often associated with performance shaping, narrative clarity, and adapting to varied directorial styles, making him a frequently sought-after editor in contemporary Hindi cinema.

=== Directorial debut ===
In 2024, Baid made his directorial debut with Chashma (Blind Spot), a short film starring Konkona Sen Sharma, Ayan Khan, and Shishir Sharma. The film premiered at the MAMI Mumbai Film Festival on 22 October 2024 under the Focus South Asia section.

Chashma follows the story of an 11-year-old boy with impaired vision who undergoes a journey of self-acceptance. Baid has stated that the story draws from his own childhood, when he himself struggled with poor eyesight and hesitated to reveal it due to fear of ridicule.

The film is written by Varun Grover and Nitin Baid, it is produced by Gubbara Entertainment. It was widely appreciated at its premiere, with critics and attendees praising its sensitivity and intimate portrayal of childhood experiences.

Baid had expressed an interest in directing for several years and had been developing a short-form project prior to Chashma. His transition into direction has been described as a natural extension of his editorial practice, though he has indicated that he intends to continue working as an editor alongside directing.

== Filmography ==
=== Film ===
Year	Title	Director	Role	Notes
2012	The World Before Her	Nisha Pahuja	Additional editor	
2012	Gangs of Wasseypur	Anurag Kashyap	First assistant editor	
2013	Shorts	Neeraj Ghaywan, Shlok Sharma, Siddharth Gupta, Anirban Roy, Rohit Pandey	Trailer/Promo editor	
2013	Beyond Bollywood	Adam Dow, Ruchika Muchhala	Trailer/Promo editor	
2014	Court	Chaitanya Tamhane	Trailer/Promo editor	
2014	Hasee to Phasee	Vinil Mathew	Associate editor	
2015	Masaan	Neeraj Ghaywan	Editor	
2016	Waiting	Anu Menon	Editor	
2016	Trapped	Vikramaditya Motwane	Editor	
2017	Half Widow	Danish Renzu	Editor	
2017	Bareilly Ki Barfi	Ashwiny Iyer Tiwari	Additional editor	
2017	Ittefaq	Abhay Chopra	Editor	
2018	Raazi	Meghna Gulzar	Editor	
2018	Bhavesh Joshi Superhero	Vikramaditya Motwane	Editor	
2018	Lust Stories	Zoya Akhtar, Dibakar Banerjee, Karan Johar, Anurag Kashyap	Editor	
2019	Gully Boy	Zoya Akhtar	Editor	
2020	Ghost Stories	Zoya Akhtar, Dibakar Banerjee, Karan Johar, Anurag Kashyap	Editor	
2020	Class of '83	Atul Sabharwal	Supervising editor	
2020	Chhapaak	Meghna Gulzar	Editor	
2020	Gunjan Saxena – The Kargil Girl	Sharan Sharma	Editor	
2021	83	Kabir Khan	Editor	
2021	Ajeeb Daastaans	Neeraj Ghaywan	Editor	
2022	Love Hostel	Shanker Raman	Editor	
2022	Darlings	Jasmeet K. Reen	Editor	
2023	Mission Majnu	Shantanu Baagchi	Editor	
2023	Rocky Aur Rani Kii Prem Kahaani	Karan Johar	Editor	
2023	Sam Bahadur	Meghna Gulzar	Editor	
2023	The Archies	Zoya Akhtar	Editor	
2023	Kho Gaye Hum Kahan	Arjun Varain Singh	Editor	
2024	Saba	Maksud Hossain	Supervising editor	
2024	Mr. & Mrs. Mahi	Sharan Sharma	Editor	
2024	Chandu Champion	Kabir Khan	Editor	
2024	Ulajh	Sudhanshu Saria	Editor	
2025	Kesari Chapter 2	Karan Singh Tyagi	Editor	
2025	Sarzameen	Kayoze Irani	Editor	
2025	Homebound	Neeraj Ghaywan	Editor	
2025	Gustaakh Ishq	Vibhu Virender Puri	Editor	

=== Television ===
Year	Title	Director	Role	Notes
2018	Ghoul	Patrick Graham	Editor	
2019	Bard of Blood	Ribhu Dasgupta	Editor	
2019	Made in Heaven	Zoya Akhtar, Reema Kagti, Nitya Mehra, Prashant Nair, Neeraj Ghaywan, Alankrita Shrivastava	Editor	2 Episodes
2021	Ray	Srijit Mukherji, Abhishek Chaubey, Vasan Bala	Editor	
2023	Dahaad	Zoya Akhtar, Reema Kagti, Ruchika Oberoi	Editor	
2023	Star Wars: Visions – The Bandits of Golak	Ishan Shukla	Editor	Volume 2 Episode 7
2025	The Ba***ds of Bollywood	Aryan Khan	Editor	

=== Short films ===
Year	Title	Director	Role	Notes
2010	Drip	Pooja Hegde	Editor	
2010	Pop!	Pooja Hegde	Editor	
2011	Shor	Neeraj Ghaywan	Editor	
2013	The Epiphany	Neeraj Ghaywan	Editor	
2013	Moi Marjaani	Anubhuti Kashyap	Editor	
2013	Safe	Rohit Pandey	Editor	
2014	Bicycle	Mailesan Rangaswamy	Editor	
2017	Juice	Neeraj Ghaywan	Editor	
2017	Shut Up	Ashutosh Pathak	Editor	
2022	Kiss	Varn Grover	Editor	
2024	Chashma	Nitin Baid	Writer, director, editor	

== Awards and nominations ==
Year	Award	Category	Result	Work	Notes
2016	Filmfare Awards	Best Editing	Nominated	Masaan	
2016	Zee Cine Awards	Best Editing	Won	Masaan	
2018	Filmfare Awards	Best Editing	Won	Trapped	
2018	Zee Cine Awards	Best Editing	Nominated	Ittefaq	
2018	FOI Online Awards	Best Film Editing	Nominated	Trapped	
2018	FOI Online Awards	Best Film Editing	Nominated	Ittefaq	
2019	Filmfare Awards	Best Editing	Nominated	Raazi	
2020	FOI Online Awards	Best Film Editing	Nominated	Gully Boy	
2020	Filmfare Awards	Best Editing	Nominated	Gully Boy	
2020	IIFA Awards	Best Editing	Won	Gully Boy	
2020	Zee Cine Awards	Best Editing	Won	Gully Boy	
2020	Filmfare OTT Awards	Best Editor	Nominated	Bard of Blood	
2021	FOI Online Awards	Best Film Editing	Nominated	Gunjan Saxena: The Kargil Girl	
2022	FOI Online Awards	Best Film Editing	Nominated	83	
2022	Filmfare Awards	Best Editing	Nominated	83	
2022	Filmfare OTT Awards	Best Editing	Won	Darlings	
2023	FOI Online Awards	Best Film Editing	Nominated	Love Hostel	
2024	Filmfare OTT Awards	Best Editing	Nominated	Kho Gye Hum Kahan	
2024	FOI Online Awards	Best Film Editing	Nominated	Kho Gye Hum Kahan	
