= London, Paris, New York (soundtrack) =

Soundtrack album by Ali Zafar
- Released: 30 January 2012
- Genre: Feature film soundtrack
- Length: 26:57
- Language: Hindi
- Label: Sony Music India
- Producer: Ali Zafar

Ali Zafar chronology
Jhoom (2011)	London, Paris, New York (2012)	Total Siyapaa (2014)
External audio
- Jukebox playlist on YouTube

London, Paris, New York is the debut soundtrack album composed and written by Ali Zafar for the 2012 film of the same name directed by Anu Menon. The album featured seven tracks and was released through Sony Music India on 30 January 2012.

== Development ==
"Music is not going to be conventional. I want to create sounds that are fresh like our film [and] since the film touches on different emotions I can experiment with genres. I will use as many 'live' instruments as possible to give the songs an organic feel."

— Ali Zafar on the music of London, Paris, New York

London, Paris, New York marked the maiden composition of Zafar for a Hindi film, after producing several studio albums in Pakistani, and also performed songs for Hindi films such as Tere Bin Laden (2010), Luv Ka The End and Mere Brother Ki Dulhan (both 2011). When Menon narrated the script to Zafar, the latter insisted her to tell him a situation from the film, where he wrote lyrics for "Voh Dekhnay Mein". He composed a demo tune which Menon liked and this resulted in Zafar composing all the songs.

Since the film unfolds in three different cities, as stated by the title, Zafar composed the songs that reflected the character as well. He added, "The London song will be happier, with simpler notes, as compared to the one set in Paris that will be edgier. The New York track will be more refined." Zafar wrote lyrics for all the songs, which he set to tune and recorded at his home studio, describing it as an "intense process but wonderfully satisfying". Zafar predominantly used live instruments to give an organic feel.

Zafar recorded vocals for most of the tracks, with Aditi Rao Hydari also performing two songs. The title track was recorded by Sunidhi Chauhan, with Pakistani singers Sanam Marvi and Hadiqa Kiani also recording one song for the film.

== Release ==
The soundtrack marketing rights were acquired by Sony Music India. The film's music was aired live at Radio City on 25 January 2012 on the evening show Taka Tak Mumbai, where Zafar and Hydari visited the radio station to interact about the film's music with RJ Rohith and RJ Adaa.

The album's launch coincided with a physical launch event held on 30 January at the Reverb Rooftop Nightclub in The Great India Place, Noida, Uttar Pradesh, where Zafar and Hydari performed all the songs live.

== Track listing ==
All lyrics are written by Ali Zafar.

No.	Title	Artist(s)	Length
1.	"London, Paris, New York"	Ali Zafar, Sunidhi Chauhan	3:43
2.	"Voh Dekhnay Mein"	Ali Zafar	4:32
3.	"Ting Rang"	Ali Zafar	4:01
4.	"Thehree Si Zindagi"	Ali Zafar, Aditi Rao Hydari, Danyal Zafar, Mannu, Gumbi, Neisha Mascerenhas	5:06
5.	"Oo Lala"	Sanam Marvi, Hadiqa Kiani, Ali Zafar	4:32
6.	"Aaja"	Ali Zafar	3:42
7.	"Voh Dekhnay Mein" (Female Acoustic Version)	Aditi Rao Hydari
Total length:			26:57

== Reception ==
Joginder Tuteja of Bollywood Hungama rated the album 3/5 and summarized that "One thing which is quite apparent after listening through the score of London Paris New York is that Ali Zafar hasn't taken a (presumably) safe route of putting together an album that covers a wider market segment. Instead he has stuck to the theme of the film and barring an odd 'bhangra' number or so, he has attempted to come up with something that goes with the mood and theme of the album. Thankfully he hasn't changed his route drastically but still for a movie which doesn't pitch itself as a regular romcom, he manages to come up with a soundtrack that goes well with the narrative." Karthik Srinivasan of Milliblog called it as a "moderately engaging soundtrack". A critic based at The Times of India wrote "Ali Zafar's music gives the film its freshness and adds to the lyricism of the love story." Another critic from Dawn noted "London Paris New York has seven tracks on its album, with Music and Lyrics predictably by Ali Zafar. The soundtrack is a snug fit within the overall structure of the film. They, almost never, interrupt the flow of the story."
