= Drishyam Films =

Indian film production company

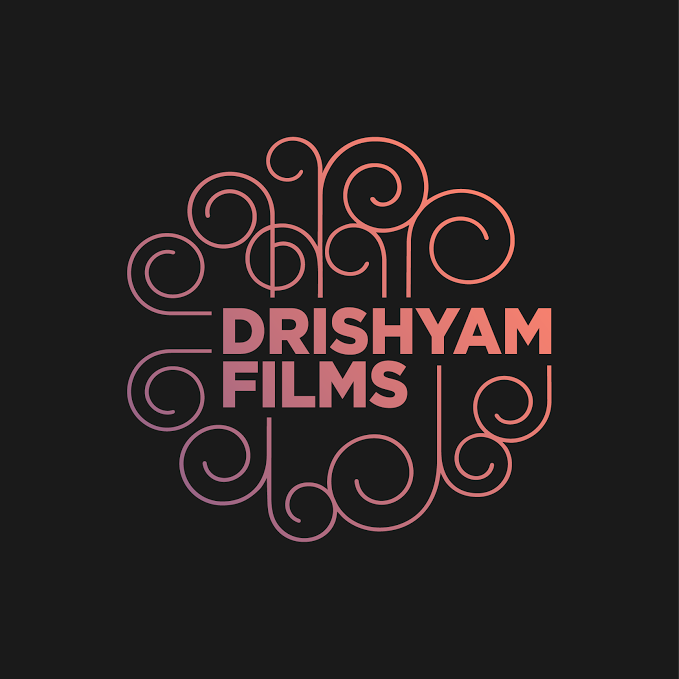
- Industry: Entertainment
- Founder: Manish Mundra
- Headquarters: India
- Products: Films
- Website: drishyamfilms.com

Drishyam Films is an independent Indian film production company. It was founded by Manish Mundra in 2014, and saw its first success with the release of the award-winning film Ankhon Dekhi in 2014. Other acclaimed releases include Umrika (2015 Sundance Audience Choice Award), Dhanak (2015 Berlinale Grand Jury Prize), and Masaan (2015 Cannes Film Festival Awards).

In May 2017, Drishyam films launched a $20 million fund to produce eight to ten independent Indian films over the next two years.

== Filmography ==
Year	Film	Director	Cast
2014	Ankhon Dekhi	Rajat Kapoor	Sanjay Mishra, Rajat Kapoor
2015	Masaan	Neeraj Ghaywan	Richa Chadda, Vicky Kaushal
2015	X	Abhinav Shiv Tiwari, Anu Menon, Hemant Gaba, Nalan Kumarasamy, Pratim D. Gupta, Q, Raja Sen, Rajshree Ojha, Sandeep Mohan, Sudhish Kamath, Suparn Verma	Rajat Kapoor
2016	Umrika	Prashant Nair	Suraj Sharma Tony Revolori Prateik Babbar Smita Tambe Adil Hussain Rajesh Tailang
2016	Dhanak	Nagesh Kukunoor	Hetal Gadda, Krrish Chhabria
2016	Waiting	Anu Menon	Naseeruddin Shah, Kalki Koechlin
2017	Newton	Amit V. Masurkar	Rajkummar Rao, Pankaj Tripathi, Sanjay Mishra, Anjali Patil, Raghubir Yadav
2017	Rukh	Atanu Mukherjee	Manoj Bajpayee, Smita Tambe, Adarsh Gourav
2017	Kadvi Hawa	Nila Madhab Panda	Sanjay Mishra, Ranvir Shorey
2019	Aadhaar	Suman Ghosh	Vineet Kumar Singh
2019	Ramprasad Ki Tehrvi	Seema Pahwa	Vinay Pathak, Konkana Sen Sharma
2020	Kaamyaab	Hardik Mehta	Sanjay Mishra, Deepak Dobriyal
2022	Love Hostel	Shanker Raman	Sanya Malhotra Vikrant Massey, Bobby Deol
2022	Recommended For You	Shamik Sen Gupta	Ayush Mehra, Manoj Singh Kaira, Prince Ali Siddiqui
2023	Siya	Manish Mundra	Viineet Kumar Singh, Pooja Pandey
2023	Ghaath	Chhatrapal Ninawe	Jitendra Joshi, Milind Shinde, Janardan Kadam, Dhananjay Mandaokar and Suruchi Adarkar
