= Manish Mundra =

Indian film producer (born 1973)

- Born: 22 April 1973 (age 53); Deoghar, Jharkhand, India
- Occupations: Businessman, Film producer

Manish Mundra (born 22 April 1973) is an Indian film producer who has produced numerous Bollywood films like Ankhon Dekhi, Masaan, Kadvi Hawa and many more to his credit.

== Early years and personal life ==
Manish Mundra was born in Deoghar, Jharkhand in a Marwari family from Jodhpur, Rajasthan. As a child, he sold cold drinks and saris to help his family. He later moved to Jodhpur to do his Master of Business Administration.

From 2000 to 2002, he first moved to Bombay for a job. After some time, he moved to Indonesia, Thailand and then Nigeria where he joined Indorama Eleme Petrochemicals as the CEO (Africa) and MD.

After few years he moved to India to become a film producer, In 2014 he started Drishyam Films, Production House. Since then, he has produced movies like Masaan (2015), Waiting (2016), Umrika (2016), Dhanak (2016), Newton (2017), Rukh (2017) Kadvi Hawa (2017) .

In 2017 Dhanak won the National Award for Best Children's Film, Newton was chosen for India's entry into the Oscars and Kadvi Hawa received a Special Mention at the National Film Awards this year.

== Philanthropy ==
He is a philanthropist and in 2014, he donated Rs 50 lakhs to bail out the Mumbai Film Festival.

During the COVID-19 pandemic, he helped hospitals in India with PPE kits, ventilators and oxygen concentrators. He also helped migrant workers leaving the cities to return to their native places with rations and financial help.

He has also donated bicycles to the Mumbai dabbawalas to help them distribute food.

== Filmography ==
Year	Film	Producer	director
2014	Ankhon Dekhi	Yes	No
2015	Masaan	Yes	No
2015	X: Past Is Present	Yes	No
2016	Waiting	Yes	No
2016	Dhanak	Yes	No
2016	Umrika	Yes	No
2017	Newton	Yes	No
2017	Rukh	Yes	No
2017	Kadvi Hawa	Yes	No
2019	Aadhaar	Yes	No
2020	Kaamyaab	Yes	No
2022	Love Hostel	Yes	No
2022	Siya	Yes	Yes

== See also ==
- Sonu Sood, a film personality known for his philanthropic work during the COVID-19 pandemic
