= LPNY =

LPNY may refer to:

- Libertarian Party of New York, a political party in the United States active in the state of New York
- London, Paris, New York, a 2012 Bollywood film
