= X: Past Is Present =

2015 Indian experimental film directed by Nalan Kumarasamy

X: Past is Present
- Film poster
- Directed by: Abhinav Shiv Tiwari; Anu Menon; Hemant Gaba; Nalan Kumarasamy; Pratim D. Gupta; Q Raja Sen; Rajshree Ojha; Sandeep Mohan; Sudhish Kamath; Suparn Verma
- Written by: Thiagarajan Kumararaja; Hemant Gaba; Raja Sen; Pratim D. Gupta; Anu Menon; Ivana Verle; Sandeep Mohan; Suparn Verma; Rajshree Ojha; Abhay Shetty; Q Sudhish Kamath
- Produced by: Manish Mundra; Sudhish Kamath; Shiladitya Bora
- Starring: Rajat Kapoor; Anshuman Jha
- Cinematography: Anuj Rakesh Dhawan; Aseem Bajaj; Dinesh B. Krishnan; Gairik Sarkar; Katyayani Mudholkar; Maeve O'Connell; Q Ravi K. Chandran; Sandeep Mohan; Siddhartha Nuni; Siddharth Kay; Sidhant Chowdhry; Viraaj Sinh Gohil
- Edited by: A. Sreekar Prasad; Vijay Prabakaran; Vijay Venkatraman; Biplab Goswami; Gairik Sarkar; Dhritiman Das; Shreyas Beltangdy; Ankit Srivastava; Ninaad Khanolkar; Ritchik Mozumdar
- Music by: Sudeep Swaroop
- Production companies: Drishyam Films; Made In Madras Ink
- Release date: 20 November 2015 (India)
- Country: India
- Languages: English; Hindi

X: Past is Present is a 2015 Indian collaborative feature film directed by a team of eleven filmmakers including Abhinav Shiv Tiwari, Anu Menon, Nalan Kumarasamy, Hemant Gaba, Pratim D. Gupta, Q, Raja Sen, Rajshree Ojha, Sandeep Mohan, Sudhish Kamath and Suparn Verma. It features actor-director Rajat Kapoor and Anshuman Jha in the lead. X is not an anthology, but one whole story with the eleven directors making sections of it. The film has been produced by Manish Mundra and has been announced for a nationwide release in India on 20 November 2015.

== Plot summary ==
"Past is Present" (Directed by Sudhish Kamath)

- Rajat Kapoor
- Aditi Chengappa

Synopsis: A filmmaker named K (Rajat Kapoor) meets a girl half his age at a film festival party. Through the course of the night she reminds him of all the women in his life, from lovers to wives to actresses.

"17 Presents" (Directed by Hemant Gaba)

- Anshuman Jha
- Piaa Bajpai

Synopsis: When K (Anshuman Jha) was still in school, he had a girlfriend named Shireen, who had showered him with gifts on his birthday but he was uncomfortable in being physically intimate with her.

"Oysters" (Directed by Anu Menon)

- Gabriella Schmidt
- Dev Sagoo
- Nabeel Qayyum

Synopsis: K (Dev Sagoo) was secretly filming a woman (Gabriella Schmidt) in London who turned out to be the mistress of the producer (Nabeel Qayyum) he was pitching his script to.

"Biryani" (Directed by Rajshree Ojha)

- Rajat Kapoor
- Radhika Apte

Synopsis: K's (Rajat Kapoor) wife Rija (Radhika Apte) tells him over a dinner at home that she knows he has been having an affair with his actress and she has gone ahead and aborted their baby.

"8 to 8" (Directed by Pratim D. Gupta)

- Parno Mittra
- Usha Uthup
- Ronodeep Bose

Synopsis: A young K's (Ronodeep Bose) first job was in Kolkata where he was allowed to stay as a paying guest in landlady Mrs Baker's (Usha Uthup) room only from 8am to 8pm. Shiuli (Parno Mittra) stayed in the same room from 8pm to 8am and the two fall in love through the poems they write to each other.

"Ice Maid" (Directed by Q)

- Rajat Kapoor
- Rii Sen

Synopsis: K (Rajat Kapoor) has a writer's block and he spikes the drinks of his maid Basanti (Rii Sen) and himself, resulting in a hallucinogenic trip where Chandramukhi and Paro are played by the same woman (Rii).

"Fin" (Directed by Sandeep Mohan)

- Anshuman Jha
- Richa Shukla

Synopsis: K (Anshuman Jha) has a flirtatious rendezvous with a girl named Sanjana (Richa Shukla) in California where he had gone to show one of his films.

"Audition" (Directed by Abhinav Shiv Tiwari)

- Rajat Kapoor
- Bidita Bag
- Pooja Ruparel

Synopsis: K (Rajat Kapoor) is caught between his mistress, the ageing actress Ayesha (Pooja Ruparel), and the new actress he wants to cast (Bidita Bag).

"Yaadein" (Directed by Suparn Verma)

- Rajat Kapoor
- Radhika Apte
- Neha Mahajan

Synopsis: K (Rajat Kapoor) has nightmares about a car accident when he was driving with a pregnant woman named Avantika (Neha Mahajan).

"Knot" (Directed by Raja Sen)

- Anshuman Jha
- Huma Qureshi

Synopsis: The young K (Anshuman Jha) has a mock interview done by his lover Veena (Huma Qureshi) who really puts him in a spot.

"Summer Holiday" (Directed by Nalan Kumarasamy; includes Tamil dialogue)

- Anshuman Jha
- Swara Bhaskar
- Yog Japee

Synopsis: When K (Anshuman Jha) was really young, he had gone to south India where he was seduced by Aunty (Swara Bhaskar) so that her husband (Yog Japee) can rape him.

== Cast ==
- Rajat Kapoor / Anshuman Jha / Ronodeep Bose / Dev Sagoo as K
- Huma Qureshi as Veena
- Swara Bhaskar as Aunty
- Radhika Apte as Rija
- Piaa Bajpai as Shireen
- Usha Uthup as Mrs Baker
- Neha Mahajan as Avantika
- Rii Sen as Basanti
- Aditi Chengappa as Aastha
- Bidita Bag as Heena
- Gabriella Schmidt
- Parno Mittra as Shiuli
- Pooja Ruparel as Ayesha
- Richa Moorjani as Sanjana
- Hagupreet Singh
- Yog Japee as Aunty's husband

== Production ==
In May 2013, it was announced that eleven filmmakers from different parts of India had come together to make one single film, with the directors stressing that the film was not an anthology, but one whole story with the eleven directors making sections of it. The film's basic plotline was quoted as "X- Past is Present is a filmmaker’s journey through his past encounters with his 10 ex-girlfriends as he spends one surreal, unforgettable night at a film festival after he meets a mysterious girl who intriguingly seems to have something to do with every woman in his life". The idea came from film critic Sudhish Kamath when he was at The Goa Project held in March. He wanted to shoot a film during the event itself but as he could not because of lack of funds and time he "decided to take the idea forward and make it bigger in scope". He met Shiladitya Bora at the event, who accepted to be the film's executive producer.

Kamath was also instrumental in getting the directors together. The eleven directors who came on board were Abhinav Shiv Tiwari (Oass), Anu Menon (London, Paris, New York), Hemant Gaba (Shuttlecock Boys), Pratim D. Gupta (Paanch Adhyay), Qaushiq Mukherjee (Gandu), Raja Sen (film critic), Rajshree Ojha (Aisha), Sandeep Mohan (Love, Wrinkle Free), Sudhish Kamath (Good Night Good Morning), Suparn Verma (Aatma) and Thiagarajan Kumararaja (Aaranya Kaandam) who had written individual segments and would direct them themselves. The filmmakers met in Mumbai in early May to lock their segments after six-weeks long online interactions and discussions. Due to Thiyagarajan Kumararaja's unavailability, Gautham Menon agreed to direct his script. However, in November 2013 it was reported that Menon was also out of the project, although he had started shooting his part in July in Puducherry, and Nalan Kumarasamy, director of Soodhu Kavvum subsequently replaced him to direct Kumararaja's segment.

Rajat Kapoor was signed as the lead actor, with the eleven segments revolving around his character K, while twelve actresses would play the female leads in each segment, with one segment featuring two female characters. Aditi Chengappa played the lead in the part directed by Sudhish Kamath. Suparn Verma started and finished shooting for his track in August with Radhika Apte and Neha Mahajan being part of his part. Piaa Bajpai was signed for the part by Hemant Gaba, while Raja Sen selected Huma Qureshi for his part of the film. Swara Bhaskar was part of the segment directed by Tamil director Nalan Kumaraswamy, with the actress stating that she shot for four days at Koovathur near Chennai. Anshuman Jha was cast as the younger Rajat Kapoor and is part of Raja Sen, Hemant Gaba and Kumararaja's segments.

== Release ==
X- Past is Present premiered as the opening film of the 2014 South Asian International Film Festival (SAIFF). After doing the rounds of various international film festivals, X- Past is Present released in India on 20 November 2015.

== Critical response ==
Josh Hurtado of Twitch Film rated X "among the most poignant love stories... in recent years." Navamy Sudhish of The New Indian Express who reviewed the film during the India premiere at the International Film Festival of Kerala wrote: "A rear-view narrative that brings together 11 confidently executed episodes, the film weaves on screen a fresh cinematic syntax" Subhash K. Jha gave the film 4/5 stars stating, "an audacious experimental film".

Namrata Joshi of The Hindu gave the film 3/5 and wrote: "There is a big idea here, which gets communicated to the viewer at times and eludes at others." Sweta Kaushal of Hindustan Times gave the film 3/5 and called it "a heady, abstract mix of the different ways sex and love can be seen. The film is a philosophical take on human life, how we are mostly the sum total of the people in our lives." She particularly raved the segments by Pratim D. Gupta and Nalan Kumaraswamy mentioning "While the Kolkata love story is the quintessential unrequited romance where the duo doesn’t even meet and connects just through poetry, the south Indian love story defines when and where K began running from people — his mistrust and his fear of opening up to people all find root in this one story."

Shubha Shetty of Mid-day gave the film 3/5 and called it "a fascinating amalgamation of a lot many flavours of varied personalities." Saibal Chatterjee of NDTV gave the film 3/5 and wrote "a cinematic pastiche that represents as audacious a leap into the unknown" that "lands firmly on its feet and keeps its balance."

Nonika Singh of The Tribune gave the film 2.5/5 and wrote that "all 11 individually directed segments blend seamlessly" and "reveal many layers of complex web of human relationship" Mohar Basu of The Times of India gave the film 2/5 calling it "a bizarre, underwhelming hotch-potch". She singled out the segment by Pratim D. Gupta as the one that stands out saying, "None of the other plots quite condense the idea of love so deeply. Though all stories are about unrequited love, this one feels the most complete one of the lot." Shubhra Gupta of Indian Express slammed the film writing that it is "a disjointed stutter, rather than a seamless progression, its backing-and-forthing more choppy and confusing than anything else."
