= Kadvi Hawa =

- Directed by: Nila Madhab Panda
- Written by: Nitin Dixit
- Screenplay by: Nitin Dixit
- Produced by: Manish Mundra; Akshay Kumar Parija; Nila Madhab Panda
- Starring: Sanjay Mishra; Ranvir Shorey; Tillotama Shome; Bhupesh Singh
- Cinematography: Ramanuj Dutta
- Edited by: Jabeen Merchant
- Music by: Songs: Santosh Jagdale; Score: Mangesh Dhakde
- Production companies: Eros International; Drishyam Films
- Release date: 24 November 2017
- Running time: 99 Minutes
- Country: India
- Language: Hindi
- Box office: ₹8.7 crore

Kadvi Hawa (transl. Bitter wind) is a 2017 Indian Hindi-language drama film, directed by Nila Madhab Panda and produced by Panda, Drishyam Films and Akshay Parija. Based on the theme of climate change, the film stars Sanjay Mishra, Ranvir Shorey and Tillotama Shome in lead roles. It was released on 24 November 2017. It also got a Special Mention at the 64th National Film Awards held on 7 April 2017. The film is presented by Drishyam Films.

== Plot ==
The film is based on true stories from drought prone Bundelkhand region and the vanishing villages from coastal Odisha and Chambal region of Dholpur, Rajasthan.

== Cast ==
- Sanjay Mishra as Hedu
- Ranvir Shorey as Gunu Babu
- Tillotama Shome
- Bhupesh Singh as Mukund
- Ekta Sawant as Kuhu
- Tanya Sejwal as Pihu
- Shrikant Verma as Teacher

== Production ==
=== Development ===
The official announcement of the film was made in the first half of November 2016. Panda had been working on the script of the film for the last 8–9 years. The director says that while shooting a Documentary on climate change in Odisha in the year 2005 he learned of the villages that had disappeared from the coastal line. That incident conceived the idea of making this film.

In Odisha, there were seven villages on a coastal line. They were called ‘seven brothers’. But when I reached there, I only saw two of them. I got a shock when I saw two hand-pumps inside water. I heard from people between 60-70 age group that those hand-pumps were earlier located in the middle of the village.

— Nila Madhab Panda on the idea behind Kadvi Hawa.

=== Casting ===
The makers of the film had decided to cast the in-demand star Sanjay Mishra, Tillotama Shome and Ranvir Shorey in the film.

=== Filming ===
The principal photography of the film commenced sometime in the Second quarter of 2016.

== Soundtrack ==
"Main Banjar"

Single by Mohan Kannan

from the album Kadvi Hawa
- Language: Hindi
- Released: 3 November 2017
- Length: 4:52
- Label: Drishyam Play
- Composer: Santosh Jagdale
- Lyricist: Mukta Bhatt
- Producer: Santosh Jagdale
External audio
- Official Song on YouTube

The soundtrack of Kadvi Hawa consists of just one song, Main Banjar, which was composed by Santosh Jagdale, lyrics were written by Mukta Bhatt and sung by Mohan Kannan.

== Critical reception ==
Sweta Kausal of Hindustan Times gave the film a rating of 4 out of 5 saying that, "This haunting tale of farmer suicides will give you goosebumps". Reza Noorani of The Times of India gave the film a rating of 3 out of 5 and said that, "With powerful dialogues by Nitin Dixit and achingly beautiful lyrics by Mukta Bhatt, the film is an engrossing watch. For a serious film on global warming, Kadvi Hawa is non-preachy and entirely watchable." Saibal Chatterjee of NDTV praised the acting performances of Sanjay Mishra and Ranvir Shorey and the direction of Nila Madhab Panda. The critic gave the film a rating of 3.5 out of 5 and said that, Kadvi Hawa "is designed to provoke contemplation and action, a mission that it achieves without any serious slips. Watch it because it is an important film that offers an essential takeaway." Shubhra Gupta of The Indian Express gave the film a rating of 2.5 out of 5 and said that, "The Sanjai Mishra starrer feels like a stretch even at 100 minutes".

Namrata Joshi of The Hindu felt that the movie was "too slow" and that its impact would have been much more with a tighter screenplay. Sreehari Nair of Rediff gave the film a rating of 4 out of 5 and said that, "This is an intensely felt, beautifully expressed, piece of cinema." Kriti Tulsiani of News18 praised the performances of Sanjay Mishra and Ranvir Shorey saying that, "Both Mishra and Shorey are in top form in their respective roles" and gave the film a rating of 3.5 out of 5. The Critic concluded her review by saying that, "The best part of the film perhaps is that it doesn't intend to answer or preach on the difference between right and wrong but instead leaves you with plenty to think about. Unsettling but rightly so." Financial Express gave the film a rating of 3 out of 5 saying that, "The film is good in parts but could have been much better with a tighter and fast-paced narration. But overall it is worth watching as the content is top grade and the topic hot."
