= Haider Rizvi =

- Born: Utraula, Balrampur, Uttar Pradesh, India
- Occupations: Screenwriter, Writer
- Years active: 2017–present
- Known for: Siya (2022); Bhool Chuk Maaf (2025)

Haider Rizvi is an Indian screenwriter who works primarily in Hindi cinema and television.

== Early life and background ==
Rizvi was born and raised in Utraula, a town in the Balrampur district of Uttar Pradesh, India.

== Career ==
Rizvi began his professional career in television writing. In 2017, he worked as a writer on the fifth season of the Star Plus comedy reality television show The Great Indian Laughter Challenge.

In 2022, he worked as a story writer on the Hindi drama film Siya, directed by Manish Mundra and produced by Drishyam Films.

In 2025, Rizvi contributed to the screenplay and dialogues of Bhool Chuk Maaf, a Maddock Films production directed by Karan Sharma. The film starred Rajkummar Rao and Wamiqa Gabbi.

== Filmography ==
=== Films ===
Year	Title	Role	Notes
2022	Siya	Story Writer	Directed by Manish Mundra
2025	Bhool Chuk Maaf	Screenplay and Dialogues	Directed by Karan Sharma; produced by Maddock Films

=== Television ===
Year	Title	Role	Network
2017	The Great Indian Laughter Challenge (Season 5)	Writer	StarPlus
