= Rukh (film) =

2017 Indian film directed by Atanu Mukherjee

- Directed by: Atanu Mukherjee
- Written by: Vasan Bala
- Screenplay by: Atanu Mukherjee; Akash Mohimen
- Produced by: Manish Mundra
- Starring: Manoj Bajpayee Smita Tambe Kumud Mishra Adarsh Gourav
- Cinematography: Pooja Gupte
- Edited by: Sanglap Bhowmik
- Music by: Amit Trivedi
- Production company: Drishyam Films
- Distributed by: Eros International
- Release date: 27 October 2017
- Running time: 106 minutes
- Country: India
- Language: Hindi

Rukh (transl. Stance) is a 2017 Indian Hindi-language thriller-drama film directed by debutant director Atanu Mukherjee. The film stars Manoj Bajpayee, Smita Tambe, Kumud Mishra and Adarsh Gourav in lead roles. The film was released on 27 October 2017.

== Plot ==
In a school yard fight, 18-year-old Dhruv Mathur (Adarsh Gourav) impetuously hits a fellow student, breaking his leg. He then gets scared and runs away. When the school expels him, his parents send him to a boarding school. Away from home in the boarding school, Dhruv is ignorant about the ongoing crisis in his family. His life takes an unexpected turn as he gets the news of his father Diwakar Mathur's (Manoj Bajpayee) death in a car accident. As he copes with the tragedy, he seeks to find out what happened. Hidden truths begin to unravel. Even as his mother Nandini (Smita Tambe) struggles to shield him, Dhruv starts looking for answers. The search leads to a series of unexpected revelations, as he discovers the shades of his father's personality and his business situation he had never known before. He discovers that his father's business partner, Robin (Kumud Mishra), was involved in shady business dealings and that his father was a good man. Dhruv believes that Robin, his father's crooked business partner, must have had his father murdered. The reality turns out to be something else and Dhruv's mother was trying to withhold information in order to protect Dhruv. Turns out Dhruv's father had borrowed money to pay the workers at his unexpectedly closed factory. The film has an unexpected ending when he is shocked to discover that his father had essentially committed suicide in order to keep his word to pay back the loan he took from a bank owner, and to leave some money for Dhruv and his mother. Dhruv grows up in this process and decides to seek and apologize to the boy he had struck in school a few years earlier.

== Cast ==
- Manoj Bajpayee as Divakar
- Adarsh Gourav as Dhruv
- Smita Tambe as Nandini
- Kumud Mishra as Robin
- Ila Bhate as Nirmala
- Shubhrajyoti Barat as Jayant
- Pawan Singh as Hassan
- Bhushan Vikas as Shinde
- Vedant Muchandi as Amrit
- Kannan Arunachalam as Rangarajan
- Sandesh Kulkarni as Arif
- Siddharth Chanda as Digant
- Anil Khopkar as Ajit
- Ravi Mahashabde as Jayesh
- Yagya Saxena as Chinmay
- Ahsaas Channa as Shruti
- Ravin Makhija as Bhushan
- Swaroop Khopkar as Usha Aunty

== Production ==
The motion poster of the film was released on 31 August 2017.

== Soundtrack ==
Rukh

Soundtrack album by Amit Trivedi
- Released: 27 October 2017
- Genre: Feature film Soundtrack
- Language: Hindi
- Label: Zee Music Company

The music of the film is composed by Amit Trivedi while the lyrics have been penned by Sidhant Mago. The first song of the film titled as "Hai Baaki" sung by Arijit Singh was released 11 October 2017.

Track listing
No.	Title	Lyrics	Music	Singer(s)	Length
1.	"Hai Baaki"	Sidhant Mago	Amit Trivedi	Arijit Singh	4:12
2.	"Khidki"	Sidhant Mago	Amit Trivedi	Mohan Kannan	5:00

== Critical reception ==
Rukh received mostly positive reviews.

Rohit Vats of Hindustan Times gave the movie 3.5 out of 5 stars and stated, "Rukh has its own narrative technique. To categorise Rukh as an art-house film would be an injustice to Atanu Mukherjee's talent. It's a ‘different’ film, for the want of a better word."

Times of India also rated the movie 3.5/5 and said, "It's a rare, mature thriller that delivers the goods and keeps you engrossed."

Saibal Chatterjee of NDTV also gave the film 3.5 out of 5 stars and stated, "This film, an exemplar of the virtues of staying true to a chosen creative arc, announces the advent of a new writer-director clearly blessed with instinctive control over the medium."

Koimoi gave the film a 3/5 rating and said, "Manoj Bajpayee Holds Your Guts Till The Last Second".

Rajeev Masand also gave the movie 3 out of stars and stated, "Despite the overwhelming heaviness, and frankly a cop-out ending, the film is powered by its performances. Bajpayee and Tambe both have a melancholic stillness, while Gourav conveys angst and grief through restlessness."

Namrata Joshi of The Hindu called it "a meandering and monotonous feature film".

Anupama Chopra gave the movie 2.5 out of 5 stars and stated that the film is intermittently engaging yet never seems essential.

== Accolades ==
Award Ceremony	Category	Recipient	Result	Ref.(s)
10th Mirchi Music Awards	Upcoming Lyricist of The Year	Sidhant Mago – "Khidki"	Nominated	
