= Waiting (2015 film) =

2015 film by Anu Menon

- Theatrical release poster
- Directed by: Anu Menon
- Written by: Anu Menon; James Ruzicka; Atika Chohan
- Produced by: Priti Gupta; Manish Mundra
- Starring: Naseeruddin Shah; Kalki Koechlin; Rajat Kapoor; Suhasini Maniratnam; Arjun Mathur
- Cinematography: Neha Parti Matiyani
- Edited by: Nitin Baid; Apurva Asrani
- Music by: Mikey McCleary
- Production companies: Ishka Films; Drishyam Films
- Release dates: 11 December 2015 (Dubai International Film Festival); 27 May 2016 (India)
- Running time: 98 minutes
- Country: India
- Language: Hindi
- Box office: ₹35 million ($540,000)

Waiting is a 2015 Indian Hindi-language drama film directed by Anu Menon. Produced by Priti Gupta and Manish Mundra under the banner of Ishka Films and Drishyam Films respectively, the film was co-written by Menon and James Ruzicka, and stars Naseeruddin Shah and Kalki Koechlin. Waiting focuses on the relationship between two people from different walks of life who befriend each other in a hospital, while nursing their respective comatose spouses. Rajat Kapoor, Suhasini Maniratnam, Arjun Mathur, Ratnabali Bhattacharjee and Rajeev Ravindranathan play supporting roles in the film.

The development of the film began in June 2014, when Menon signed Koechlin and Shah for an untitled project. Principal photography started in November 2014 in the South Indian coastal city of Kochi; Neha Parti served as the cinematographer for the film. New Zealand-based singer-songwriter Mikey McCleary composed the film's score. Nitin Baid and Apurva Asrani edited the film, and Atika Chohan wrote the dialogue. Waiting also marked the Hindi film debut of the prominent South Indian actress-director Suhasini Maniratnam. Koechlin also made her debut as a lyricist with the film's soundtrack, writing the song "Waiting for You".

Waiting had its world premiere at the Dubai International Film Festival on 11 December 2015 to positive reviews from critics. It was also screened at the closing gala of the London Asian Film Festival, where Menon won the Best Director Award. The film was released theatrically in India on 27 May 2016. Upon release in India, Waiting was well received by critics, with particular praise for the performances of Koechlin and Shah, and Menon's direction. The film had a below average run at the box office, collecting a total of ₹35 million (US$360,000) during its theatrical run.

== Plot ==
Shiv Natraj (Naseeruddin Shah), an elderly psychology professor, arrives at a hospital in Kochi to visit his comatose wife, Pankaja (Suhasini Maniratnam). Tara Kapoor Deshpande (Kalki Koechlin), a young advertising agent, also arrives at the hospital during the night after being delivered news of a car accident involving her husband, Rajat Deshpande (Arjun Mathur). She is consoled by Rajat's eccentric co-worker Girish (Rajeev Ravindranathan), but dismisses him abruptly. Tara is deeply disturbed to see Rajat breathing on a ventilator, and leaves immediately.

In the waiting lounge, Tara approaches Shiv, believing him to be a doctor, and asks for his advice. He reveals that his wife had a stroke eight months ago while he was out watching a cricket match, and has been in a coma ever since. The two bond over their similar situations. Later, Girish drops Tara off at a hotel and gives her Rajat's bag. Tara finds his watch in it and puts it on. The next day she is angered after reading an intimate message on Rajat's phone from a colleague Sheetal, who is later revealed to be a man. Shiv witnesses the whole misunderstanding, and the two share a light moment. He later visits her at the hotel, and she shares her disappointment with her friends and followers on social media for having abandoned her. She commends Shiv for his composure, as he explains the five stages of grief to her.

Tara finds her strength in Shiv, a wiser and more experienced counterpart. The two start spending most of their spare time together coping with their grief, despite being completely opposite in nature. Shiv takes Tara to the temple, and she takes him shopping. Rajat's doctor, Nirupam Malhotra (Rajat Kapoor), tells Tara that Rajat has a hematoma in his brain and an operation might help him recover, but it carries the risk of partial paralysis. Tara is torn, as she believes Rajat would not want to take the risk, and seeks advice from Shiv. He is already at loggerheads with Dr. Malhotra, dismissing him as a pawn of the hospital board and the insurance companies who only care about making money and not the patients. Tara and Shiv get into a heated argument. Shiv lashes out angrily at Tara for not giving Rajat a chance at life. Tara retorts that she is a realist, and dismisses Shiv for being selfish and making his wife go through pain for his own sake.

Tara's best friend Ishita (Ratnabali Bhattacharjee) arrives at Kochi and advises her to start chanting prayers and to inform Rajat's estranged parents of his situation. Despite being an atheist, Tara chants Namu Myōhō Renge Kyō when she is alone with Rajat. Shiv desperately attempts to convince Malhotra to perform a spinal decompression on his wife, but he disregards Shiv's research and refuses to proceed with surgery. Tara discusses Rajat's surgery with Ishita and decides not to go ahead with it, which further angers Malhotra. Ishita leaves to aid her ailing son. Tara realises that she is no longer Ishita's top priority, now that Ishita is married. Shiv and Tara make up and later that night dance together at Shiv's house, much to the amusement of his neighbours. They get upset thinking about their spouses and discuss what they meant to them, before falling asleep in the living room.

The next morning, Tara leaves early and decides to inform Rajat's mother. After Girish brings Tara the required insurance papers, she thanks him for always being there for her and apologises for being rude. She decides to go ahead with the surgery after all. Rajat is taken to surgery, and she holds his hand until they arrive at the operating room. Shiv, on the other hand, decides to take Pankaja off the ventilator and let his wife herself make the final call. Pankaja tries to breathe on her own as the viewers are treated with flashbacks of the heyday of both couples. Tara takes a seat in the waiting lounge, and is joined by Shiv as the camera pans out.

== Cast ==
- Naseeruddin Shah as Professor Shiv Kumar Natraj
- Kalki Koechlin as Tara Deshpande
- Arjun Mathur as Rajat Deshpande
- Rajat Kapoor as Dr. Nirupam Malhotra
- Suhasini Maniratnam as Pankaja Natraj
- Nandini Sree as Nurse Ann
- Rajeev Ravindranathan as Girish
- Ratnabali Bhattacharjee as Ishita
- Marin Babu as Nurse Prema
- Krishna Shankar as Ravi
- Gavin Methalaka as Lokesh

== Production ==
=== Development ===
Made on a modest budget, the movie Waiting was produced by Priti Gupta of Ishka Films and Manish Mundra of Drishyam Films. The film was directed by Anu Menon, her second directorial work after the romantic comedy London, Paris, New York (2012). She also co-wrote the script with fellow London Film School alumnus and former anesthesiologist James Ruzicka. Menon, inspired by her own personal experience, started working on the film's script with Ruzicka. She called the writing process extremely difficult as they had to figure out "what it means to be associated with a comatose patient, both emotionally and medically". She said later that Ruzicka's experience as a medical practitioner proved really helpful in developing a logical understanding of the situation. Menon revealed that she had begun writing the story years before the actual production for the film began, and that it took her several years to complete it.

Pre-production work began in July 2014, when Mundra, a Dubai-based film producer, agreed to produce. Menon wanted an entirely different setting for the film, away from "fast paced city life", and decided to set the story in the South Indian state of Kerala. The film's director of photography was cinematographer Neha Parti Martyani, who had been previously associated with films including My Name Is Khan (2010) and Yamla Pagla Deewana (2011). The film's dialogue was written by Atika Chohan. Prajakta Ghag was the film's production designer.

Entertainment website Bollywood Hungama reported that Kalki Koechlin was set to star in Menon's upcoming film. The published reports revealed that Koechlin would be playing the role of the young, brash, and social-media-savvy Tara Deshpande. Koechlin's co-star from That Girl in Yellow Boots (2011) and Zindagi Na Milegi Dobara (2011), Naseeruddin Shah, joined the cast after he was approached by Menon, who sent him the film's script in an e-mail. Shah, who did not have any prior knowledge of Menon's work, accepted the male lead role in the film. To prepare for the role, Koechlin worked on the dialect in which her character spoke, an amalgamation of Hindi and English. She also dyed her hair black for the role, as Menon wanted her to look more "earthy". In an interview with Gulf News, Koechlin said she loved the film's vibe and compared it to the American drama Lost In Translation (2003). In a separate e-mail interview with Arti Daniel of The Khaleej Times, Shah said that Waiting was his way of making up to the audience for the spate of "ghastly movies" that he did in 2014.

South Indian actress and director Suhasini Maniratnam made her debut in Hindi cinema with Waiting; she was cast in the role of Pankaja, Shah's character's wife. Menon talked about her experience working with Suhasini saying, "With her experience, she also helped me with a few difficult scenes behind the camera." Arjun Mathur played the role of Rajat Deshpande, Tara's husband, who is involved in a car accident; Rajat Kapoor played Nirupam Malhotra, a doctor at the Kochi Hospital. Ratnabali Bhatachajee, Rajeev Ravindranathan and Marin Babu played supporting roles in the film. The rest of the film's supporting cast consisted mainly of Malayali actors, including Dinesh Nair and Krishna Sankar, who were signed up with assistance from Gautam Pisharody, a local casting agent.

=== Filming and post-production ===
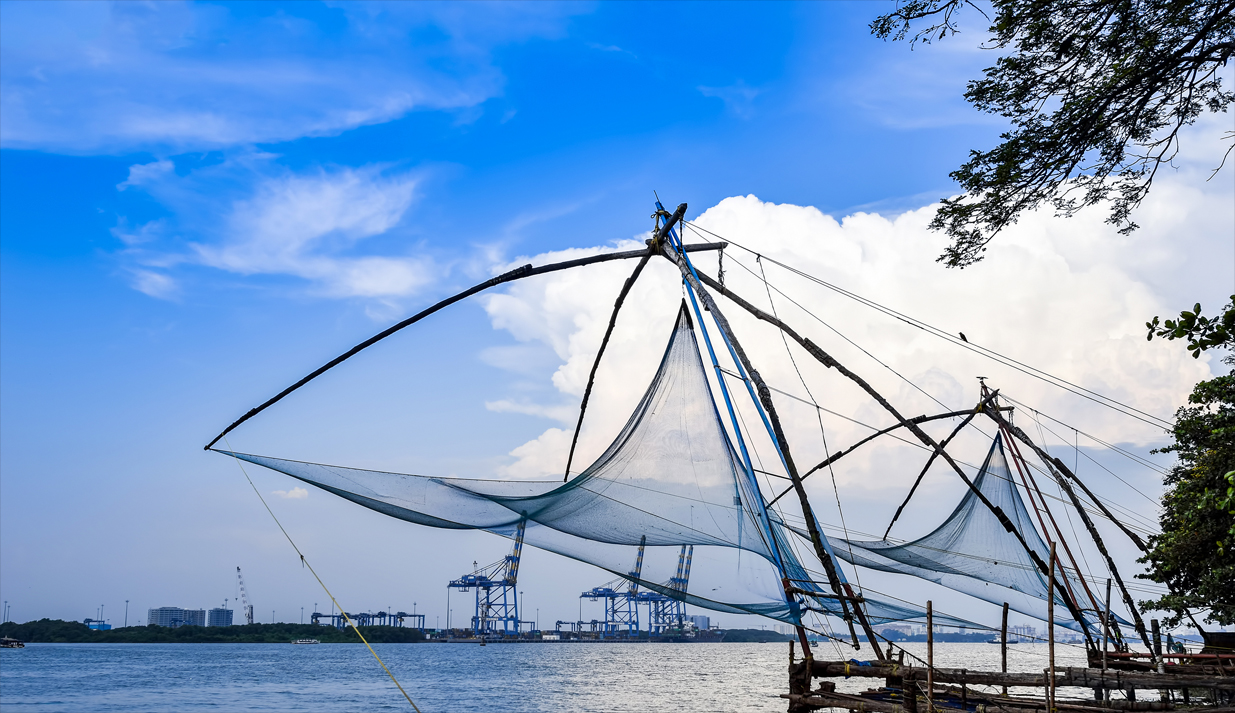
Filming took place primarily in the coastal town of Kochi, Kerala.

Principal photography began in November 2014 in the coastal city of Kochi, Kerala. The shoot for the entire film was completed on schedule in around 30 days. Of the shooting experience, Menon said, "The experience was beautiful though there were many challenges as we were predominantly an all-woman crew." In an interview with The Hindu, Koechlin revealed that throughout the production process, she questioned Menon several times as she wanted to better understand her character's background. She said that she would have lengthy discussions regarding particular scenes with Menon, who would then redraft the part. She also enjoyed working with Shah, describing the experience as "gratifying".

The team of editors for Waiting was headed by Apurva Asrani and Nitin Baid. The sound mixing was done by London-based sound engineer Roland Heap, with assistance from Mandar Kamalapurkar and Udit Daseja. Prajakta Ghag was the film's Production Designer and the marketing department was headed by Parull Gosain. The editing process for the film took place in March 2015. The film's final cut ran for a total of 98 minutes.

Menon talked to The National about the film prior to its release, saying that the story was close to her heart as it was inspired by her own personal experience. On working with Koechlin and Shah she said, "He (Shah) was punctual and always prepared, he gave his best performance in the first take. Kalki allows herself to be vulnerable. She is more porous and chilled out." Menon acknowledged the chemistry of the leading duo and said that they were committed to the project and non-demanding. She described Waiting as a "gentle and poignant film" and said, "It would make the audiences want to reach out to the leading characters and help them find their answers."

== Soundtrack ==
Waiting

Soundtrack album by Mikey McCleary
- Released: 16 May 2016
- Recorded: 2016
- Genre: Feature film soundtrack
- Length: 14:19
- Label: Zee Music Company
- Producer: Mikey McCleary

The film's music was composed by Mikey McCleary, with Kavita Seth, Nikhil D'Souza, Anushka Manchanda, Vishal Dadlani and McCleary serving as vocalists for the album. The tracks' lyrics were written by McCleary, Koechlin Manoj Muntashir, and Ankur Tewari. The first song on the album, "Tu Hai Toh Main Hoon", a pop ballad by Manchanda and D'Souza, was released on YouTube on 4 May 2016. The album consisted of three other songs; McCleary's "Got My Eyes For You", Manchanda's "Waiting For You", and Seth and Dadlani's "Zara Zara". The complete soundtrack for Waiting was released on 16 May 2016, under the Zee Music Company label.

The film's soundtrack was well received by critics. The tracks "Tu Hai Toh Main Hoon" and "Zara Zara" garnered positive response from critics and audiences alike; Manavi Kapoor of Business Standard remarked, "'Zara Zara' and 'Tu Hai Toh Main Hun' are haunting and perfectly capture the poignant tone of the film." Ushnota Paul writing for Filmfare was also laudatory of both the songs, as each "lingers with you for long". In another soundtrack review for The Times of India, Mohar Basu praised McCleary's "trademark effervescence", which made the soundtrack of Waiting "oh-so-charming." She summed up by writing that the album had, "a few pleasant songs and even though they all sound fairly similar, it has a satisfying effect". Manish Gaekwad of Scroll.in gave a mixed review; he was analogous in the praise of the "pleasant" nature of the tracks, but was critical of the lyrics that didn't go beyond the "greeting-card sentiment".

Track list
| No. | Title | Lyrics | Music | Singer(s) | Length |
|---|---|---|---|---|---|
| 1. | "Tu Hai Toh Main Hoon" | Manoj Muntashir | Mikey McCleary | Nikhil D'Souza, Anushka Manchanda | 4:18 |
| 2. | "Got My Eyes On You" | Mikey McCleary | Mikey McCleary | Mikey McCleary | 2:49 |
| 3. | "Waiting on You" | Kalki Koechlin, Mikey McCleary | Mikey McCleary | Mikey McCleary, Anushka Manchanda | 3:25 |
| 4. | "Zara Zara" | Ankur Tewari | Mikey McCleary | Kavita Seth, Vishal Dadlani | 4:27 |
| Total length: | | | | | 14:19 |

== Release ==
=== Marketing and release ===
Waiting had its world premiere on 11 December 2015 at the 12th edition of the Dubai International Film Festival. There the film's executive producer Priti Gupta, founder of Ishka Films, emphasised the universality of the film and said, "It is an endearing and beautiful movie for not just Indian[s], but the world audience, as it is essentially about the universal human circumstances, which are deftly portrayed in a tender yet humorous way." Manish Mundra, founder of Drishyam Films, expressed his delight at the screening of the film, acknowledging that Dubai was one of the biggest overseas markets for Indian films. The film was also screened at the closing gala of the London Asian Film Festival, and at the Indian Film Festival of Los Angeles.

The official trailer for Waiting was released on 22 April 2016 to positive response from both critics and audience alike. Rajani Chandel of The Times of India asserted that it "will move you to tears", while The Huffington Post India editor Ankur Pathak noted the leading duo's "effortlessly comfortable vibe", and dubbed the trailer "lovely". Menon talked about the challenges of promoting an independent film and attracting viewers saying, "The distribution is first weekend collection driven [...] Those depending on a buzz created by word of mouth are at a disadvantage." The film had a special screening prior to its theatrical release which was attended by the cast and crew and other Bollywood celebrities including: Gulshan Devaiah, Radhika Apte, Huma Qureshi, Rajkummar Rao and Adil Hussain. It had its theatrical release on 27 May 2016 in India.

=== Box office ===
The film had a poor opening at the box office as the morning vacancy varied from 2 to 3 per cent in multiplexes. The film managed to collect a mere ₹2.5 million (US$26,000) on its opening day. It was released alongside other indie films including Veerappan and Phobia, both of which also had a relatively poor opening. However, Waiting showed good growth over the day with the best occupancy among the aforementioned films. The numbers grew as the film collected ₹4.8 million (US$50,000) and ₹5.5 million (US$57,000) on its second and third day respectively, bringing the first weekend gross to a total of ₹12.8 million (US$130,000). It carried on with steady numbers through the first and the second week collecting ₹25 million (US$260,000). Waiting grossed a total of around ₹35 million (US$360,000) in its entire run at the box office.

== Reception ==
=== India ===
As a viewing experience, Waiting is refreshingly restrained when compared to most other Hindi films. It struck me as a cross between Lost in Translation (2003) and The Descendants (2011).

— Suprateek Chatterjee, The Huffington Post India

The film opened to largely positive reviews in India. Saibal Chatterjee of NDTV gave the film the highest praise and deemed it "a well-chiselled marvel" saying: "Waiting is at once heart-wrenching and uplifting ... marked by deep philosophical undertones, but it is never unduly ponderous." A reviewer for The New Indian Express also spoke highly of the film saying, "Not since Ritesh Batra's The Lunchbox have I seen an indie film addressing itself to the ageless issue of human desolation and individual grief with such warmth, dignity, grace, honesty and humour." For Namrata Joshi of The Hindu, the script was "dignified [and] without any false notes", and the film managed "to stand on its own emotional ground ... The people, situations, relationships, feelings are layered, warm and humorous, ringing true in their complexities." Mohar Basu of The Times of India called the film "thought-provoking" writing: "Menon has whipped up a warm tale about love, loss and surviving life's catastrophic blows, with such simplicity."

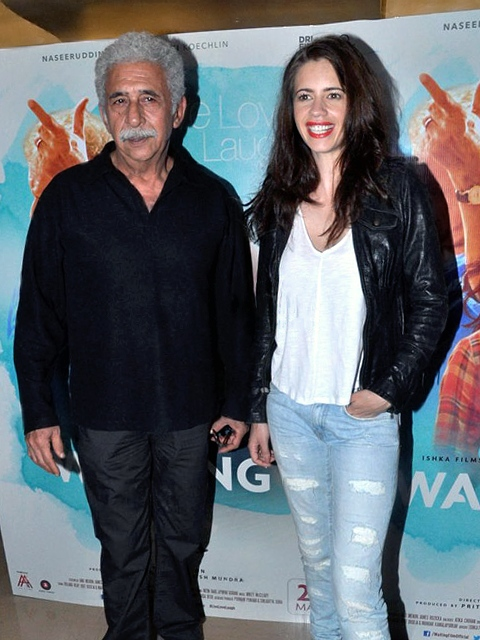
Kalki Koechlin (right) and Naseeruddin Shah were chiefly praised for their performances.

Kunal Guha of the Mumbai Mirror lauded the film's direction and cinematography saying, "Menon has the tenacity of a Sofia Coppola to produce frames where not much happens but one is unable to look away", and concluded, "The film deserves a watch for being one that doesn't try too hard and for its approach to an extreme situation." Rohit Bhatnagar of Deccan Chronicle, while also praising the technical expertise, said, "Neha Parti Matiyani beautifully captures the beautiful city of Kochi" and called the film "unmissable" saying, "Waiting is a refreshing subject that is engaging enough right up till its open-ended climax." Shubhra Gupta writing for The Indian Express thought that the film was "too explanatory, too talky", and that "the most effective moments in the film occur when the two leads are allowed to fall silent, to just be in that moment, to loosen up". While lauding the film's treatment of the subject matter, Gupta described Waiting as "a film about life, lasting love and impending loss which explores a zone Bollywood doesn't bother with".

The performances of the leading pair of Koechlin and Shah were chiefly praised by several critics. Guha in his review remarked "this film belongs to Kalki, who impresses by managing to wordlessly convey her character's state of mind in every scene". Chatterjee, offering a similar observation, wrote that Koechlin "provides the ideal foil, adding immensely to the emotional depth of the tale and heightening the conflict between two unlike poles". The latter thought that the lead performances empowered the film. In her review for Rediff.com Sukanya Verma called the film "absolutely riveting", and wrote of Koechlin that "[t]here's something stunningly unhindered about Kalki and her aura. She uses this quality in the most mesmeric fashion to create a woman we sympathise with and wish well for."

In her review for Firstpost, Anna M. M. Vetticad wrote that the leading pair "shine in a lovely film" noting that chemistry between them was "unmistakable". She concluded by saying, "[Waiting] is both sad and amusing, believable, well acted and very well told". Sweta Kaushal of Hindustan Times summed up her review by writing, "Packaged with Naseeruddin as the adorable old man ... and Kalki as the charming young, energetic woman, Waiting is a delight." While acknowledging the "underdeveloped and overwritten" parts of the plot, Gupta was nonetheless appreciative of Koechlin and Shah, calling them good fits for their roles. Rajeev Masand writing for News18 offered similar observations; he criticized the "weak" plotting, but talked well of the characters: "you yearn for them to just shut up and soak in the silence. Each time they do, the film soars." Also lauding Shah's "real" and Koechlin's "endearing" performances, he wrote that Waiting, "raises important questions about life, love, and letting go. Plus there are those two splendid performances. That's plenty to merit a viewing."

=== Overseas ===
The film received positive reviews from critics at the Dubai International Film Festival who praised the story's narrative, Menon's direction, and the performances of the lead pairing of Koechlin and Shah. Gautaman Bhaskaran of Hindustan Times called the film a "tragic, witty affair" and praised the humour of presenting the contrast between Shiv and Tara. Fionnuala Halligan of Screen International lauded the cinematography and Neha Parti Mtiyani's "dignified lenswork" and wrote further, "Waiting simmers in its locales without being brash or boastful; the colours of India are there, glowing at the sidelines." She also lauded Koechlin's and Shah's performances saying that the film "benefits greatly from Koechlin's appeal ... she has an expressive face to match her talent" and added that Shah's presence "lends the film its grace-notes". Deborah Young of The Hollywood Reporter also gave it a positive review calling the film: "A tender, often humorous tale with sparkling performances." In her opinion, "Koechlin does an exceptional job navigating the shoals of this as a kooky drama queen" while "Shah brings great feeling and complexity to the role of the wise, tolerant Shiv."

== Accolades ==
| Year | Award | Category | Recipient(s) and nominee(s) | Result | Ref(s) |
|---|---|---|---|---|---|
| 2016 | London Asian Film Festival | Best Director | Anu Menon | Won | |
| 2016 | Washington DC South Asian Film Festival | Best Story | Anu Menon and James Ruzicka | Won | |
| 2016 | Washington DC South Asian Film Festival | Best Actor | Naseeruddin Shah | Won | |
