= Umrika =

2015 film by Prashant Nair

- Directed by: Prashant Nair
- Screenplay by: Prashant Nair
- Produced by: Swati Shetty; Manish Mundra
- Starring: Suraj Sharma; Tony Revolori; Prateik Babbar; Smita Tambe; Sauraseni Maitra; Adil Hussain; Rajesh Tailang; Pramod Pathak; Amit Sial
- Cinematography: Petra Korner
- Edited by: Xavier Box; Patricia Rommel
- Music by: Dustin O'Halloran
- Production company: Drishyam Films
- Release date: January 24, 2015 (Sundance)
- Running time: 102 minutes
- Country: India
- Language: Hindi

Umrika (transl. America) is a 2015 Indian Hindi comedy-drama film written and directed by Prashant Nair, and produced by Swati Shetty and Manish Mundra. It features Suraj Sharma, Tony Revolori, Smita Tambe, Rajesh Tailang, Pramod Pathak, Adil Hussain, Amit Sial, Sauraseni Maitra and Prateik Babbar.

Umrika premiered at the 2015 Sundance Film Festival, where it won the World Cinema Dramatic Audience Award. Director Nair said that the film is "about the mythology of America, and more generally, how cultures perceive each other".

== Plot ==
The film begins with Uday (Prateik Babbar) leaving his village for the United States, telling his little brother Ramakant "Rama" (Suraj Sharma) to always remember what he tells him. While his mother is crying due to Uday's departure, Rama tells him to always write to the family when he gets to "Umrika" ("America" as spoken with an accent).

Following the death of his father, Rama realises that the letters his family has been receiving from Udai have been forged by his father and uncle, and learns that Udai vanished when he reached the port city of Mumbai. He embarks upon a journey to locate his brother.

Rama learns that his brother had been working as a barber in Mumbai in a rural area. Rama is devastated and decides to join the trafficking gang led by an underground gangster who demands 2 lakh rupees to take him to New York City. Rama did not hesitate once and gave 2 lakhs to the man. By that night of that day he was called at serine place to get picked up. He was then dropped off a port where he finds his brother was working as an assistant for the underground boss. He did not look at his brother and got up into a container with other girls and boys which naturally stated us it was a human trafficking container. In the climax the ship boarded for the New York city and camera pans to the back view of Uday who stares at the container ship sailing off on the huge ocean. After that the gangster came to him and said to return the loan of 2 lakhs he took from him.

== Cast ==
- Prateik Babbar as Udai
- Suraj Sharma as Ramakant
- Tony Revolori as Lalu
- Adil Hussain as Patel
- Sauraseni Maitra as Radhika
- Nidhi Bisht as Pinky
- Lin Laishram as Udai's Wife
- Rajesh Tailang as Postman

== Soundtrack ==
Umrika

Soundtrack album by Dustin O'Halloran
- Released: 24 August 2015
- Genre: Feature film soundtrack
- Length: 37:54
- Label: Splinter Records

The soundtrack of Umrika consists of 17 tracks composed by Dustin O'Halloran.

Tracklisting
No.	Title	Length
1.	"Prologue"	03:21
2.	"The Priest"	01:57
3.	"Letters"	01:10
4.	"Umrika Village"	02:24
5.	"Death of a Father"	01:58
6.	"Secrets Revealed"	02:22
7.	"A Chosen Path"	02:09
8.	"A Passage to Mumbai"	01:11
9.	"Into the City"	01:29
10.	"Umrika"	01:23
11.	"A Killing"	02:59
12.	"You Are Lost Brother"	02:30
13.	"Pictures of Family"	02:18
14.	"Goodbye"	02:13
15.	"Farewell My Brother"	02:06
16.	"A Voyage Begins"	05:11
17.	"Epilogue"	01:05
Total length:		37:54

== Release ==
Shortly after its premiere, the film was sold by sales agent Beta Cinema to France, Germany, Austria, Australia, South Korea and numerous other territories, making it one of the most widely distributed Indian independent films of recent times that was, incidentally, never released in India. The film had its European premiere at the Karlovy Vary International Film Festival, 2015.

== Reception ==
=== Critical reception ===
On review aggregator website Rotten Tomatoes Umrika has an approval score of 77% based on 13 reviews with an average rating of 6.4 out of 10. Kenneth Turan of the Los Angeles Times called Umrika a "warmly intelligent film" and included it in his 25 Films of note at Sundance 2015. Dennis Harvey of Variety praised the film, giving kudos to "Nair’s soundly constructed script and deft handling of a very good cast." Boyd van Hoeij of The Hollywood Reporter stated Nair has managed to incorporate several big and abstract topics—including what ties us to our families and place of birth and the extent to which these things are important—into a story in which they become highly personal for the characters. Nikola Grozdanovic of IndieWire gave the film a rating of C− saying that, '"Umrika" is ultimately a non sequitur story that, at worst, holds no weight, and, at best, makes little sense to someone born outside of Indian values and traditions.' The New Zealand Herald gave the film a rating of 3.5 out of 5 and said that, "It's a sobering watch and an interesting, if not outstanding, film." Paul Byrnes of The Sydney Morning Herald gave the film a rating of 4 out of 5 saying that, "Umrika achieves remarkable power as a story by concentrating its view of America through the eyes of people who have never been there." Sharon Hurst of Cinephilia gave the film a rating of 4 out of 5 and said that, "Umrika captures the anomaly and paradox that is life in India. But it is also a finely wrought narrative that ticked enough boxes for it to be a crowd-pleasing winner of the Audience Award at Sundance 2015."

== Awards ==
- HP Briding The Borders Award. Palm Springs International Film Festival, 2016
- FIPRESCI Critic's Prize. Cairo International Film Festival, 2015
- (Nominated) Golden Pyramid Award. Cairo International Film Festival, 2015
- Audience Award, World Cinema Dramatic Competition. Sundance Film Festival, 2015
- (Nominated) Grand Jury Prize, World Cinema Dramatic Competition. Sundance Film Festival, 2015
- Audience Award, Narrative Feature. CAAMFest, 2016
