= Chashma (film) =

Indian short film released in 2024

- Official poster
- Directed by: Nitin Baid
- Screenplay by: Varun Grover
- Story by: Nitin Baid
- Produced by: Dimpy Agrawal; Meena Agrawal; Nikhel Thavrani; Alkesh Thavrani
- Starring: Konkona Sen Sharma; Ayan Khan; Shafeen Patel; Kabir Shah; Nishan Nanaiah; Shishir Sharma
- Cinematography: Linesh Desai
- Edited by: Nitin Baid
- Music by: Alokananda Dasgupta
- Production company: Gubbara Entertainment
- Release date: 22 October 2024 (MAMI Mumbai Film Festival)
- Running time: 20 minutes
- Country: India
- Language: Hindi

Chashma (also referred to as Blind Spot) is a 2024 Indian short film directed by Nitin Baid in his directorial debut. The story of the film was written by Nitin Baid, with the screenplay and dialogue by Varun Grover, and produced by Gubbara Entertainment. It stars Konkona Sen Sharma, Ayan Khan, Shafeen Patel, Kabir Shah and Shishir Sharma in pivotal roles. The film premiered at the MAMI Mumbai Film Festival 2024 under the Focus South Asia section.

== Plot ==
The film follows the story of 11-year-old Supriyo, a boy with poor vision, who faces challenges at school and struggles with self-acceptance. Through his journey, the film explores themes of identity, personal growth, and navigating social perceptions. The narrative is told from the perspective of children, emphasizing power dynamics and emotional nuances among peers.

Set in India in 1992, a period marked by rising socio-political tensions, the film incorporates themes of social unease. A school conflict between Vinay and Sameer reflects the broader unrest of the time, further challenging Supriyo, who is also coping with the instability of a broken home and his fear of admitting that he needs glasses.

== Cast ==
- Ayan Khan as Supriyo
- Konkona Sen Sharma as Aarti (Supriyo's mother)
- Nishan Nanaiah as Supriyo's father
- Shafeen Patel as Sameer
- Kabeer Shah as Vinay
- Shishir Sharma as Principal
- Vijay Shrivastava as Tripathi Ji

== Production ==
Nitin Baid, known for his work as an editor on films such as Gully Boy and Masaan, made his directorial debut with Chashma. Baid drew inspiration from his childhood experiences of struggling with poor vision, which influenced the film's central theme of self-acceptance.

Konkona Sen Sharma, who plays the mother, was approached personally by Baid. He highlighted her ability to bring emotional depth to the role, despite limited screen time. The screenplay was written by Varun Grover, and the film was produced by Dimpy Agrawal under Gubbara Entertainment.

Nitin Baid has credited Vishal Bhardwaj for contributing significantly to the creative process: Bhardwaj suggested that they “decrease exclusive” elements in the film, helping make the story more grounded and emotionally resonant. Baid described Bhardwaj's involvement as pivotal, acknowledging him for offering valuable artistic guidance during the film's development.

Chashma is semi-autobiographical: Baid drew from his childhood experiences in school, including myopia and his fear of being questioned about things he could not clearly see. Konkona Sen Sharma did not take a fee for her role, participating "for the love of the script" and also contributing as a quasi-executive producer.

== Release and Reception ==
Chashma premiered at the MAMI Mumbai Film Festival 2024 on 22 October 2024. The short film was screened as part of the Focus South Asia section, receiving positive responses for its sensitive handling of childhood struggles and nuanced storytelling.

Dimpy Agrawal, producer at Gubbara Entertainment, praised the ensemble cast and highlighted the collaboration between Baid and Grover, noting the film's ability to encourage audiences to look beyond the surface of characters’ actions.

Prior to the festival, an exclusive screening was held in Mumbai on 22 August 2024, attended by Sidharth Malhotra, Reema Kagti, Akanksha Ranjan Kapoor, and Aryan Khan. Sidharth Malhotra called the film "thought-provoking" and praised its "lovely heart and lovely message. At the same event, Konkona described the film as "very sensitive" and highlighted its nuanced portrayal of power dynamics among children.

== Themes ==
The film addresses issues such as childhood insecurity, visual impairment, societal expectations, and self-acceptance. Baid's personal experiences, particularly his reluctance to reveal his own vision problems as a child, informed the film's authentic depiction of a child navigating similar challenges.

The film further explores how appearances can be deceiving and how perception shapes identity, both literally and metaphorically.

Konkona added that the story also touches upon emotional resilience and the complexity of mothers navigating separation and personal identity.
