= Rajeev Ravindranathan =

Indian actor and comedian

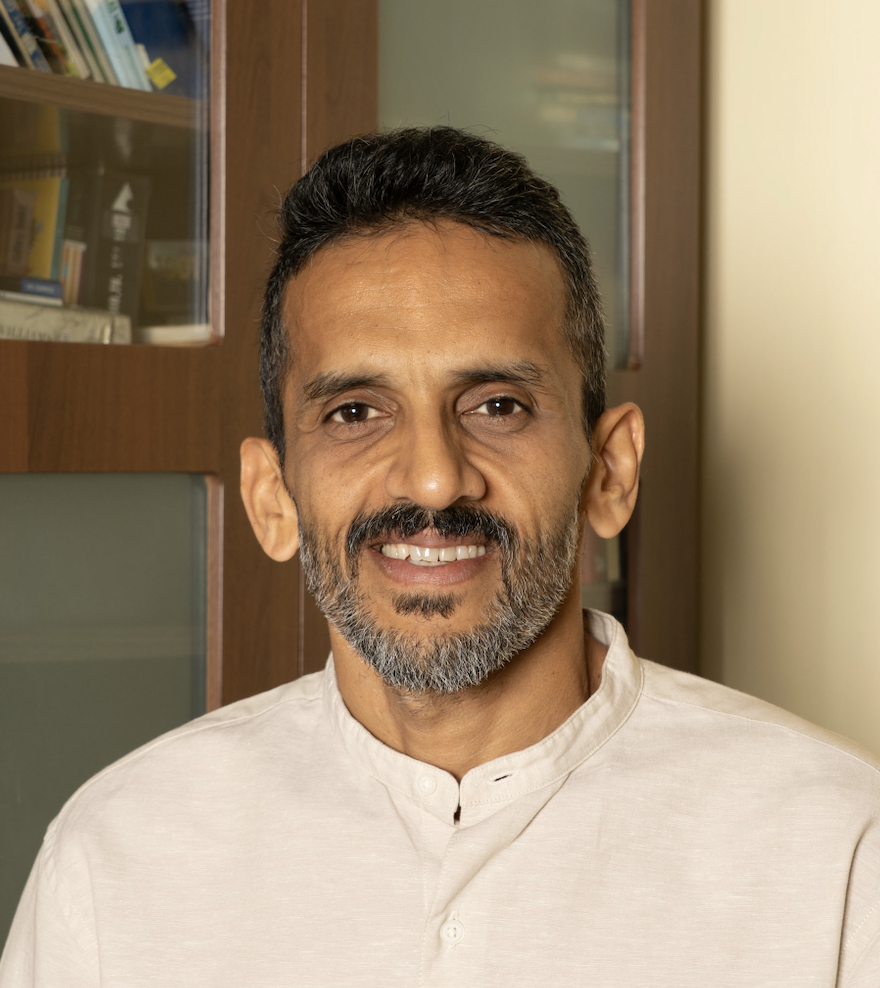
- Occupation: Actor
- Years active: 2003-present
- Notable work: English Vinglish (2012)

Rajeev Ravindranathan (also known as Rajeev Ravindranath) is an Indian actor and comedian who works in Hindi and Tamil-language films. He is known for his roles in 3 Idiots (2009), English Vinglish (2012), and Rocketry: The Nambi Effect (2022).

== Early life ==
Rajeev Ravindranathan studied business management for his bachelor's degree at Christ University. He originally began his career at HSBC in the late 1990s and went on to work various jobs in financial planning and advertising until the early 2000s.

== Career ==
Ravindranathan played minor roles in Freaky Chakra (2003) and Bas Yun Hi (2003), but was first noticed in Rajkumar Hirani's 3 Idiots (2009) for his role as a senior in college who rags Aamir Khan's character. He initially auditioned for the role of Chatur (later played by Omi Vaidya) and was cast in R. Madhavan's role. After shooting for the film for two months, his scenes were reshot because Hirani wanted to cast a "known face" and he was cast in a different role. He notably played Ramamurthy, Sridevi's Tamil techie classmate in English class in English Vinglish (2013). Post this film, Ravindranathan went on to play roles in various films such as Shamitabh (2015) and Waiting (2015). He garnered appreciation by the audience for his role in Rocketry: The Nambi Effect (2022) as Param, Nambi Narayanan's friend. The character is fictitious and an amalgamation of different people in Narayanan's life.

Ravindranathan is Bengaluru-based and has appeared in several plays.

== Filmography ==
Key
†	Denotes films that have not yet been released

Year	Film	Role	Notes
2003	Freaky Chakra	Ticket clerk	
2003	Bas Yun Hi	Leech in bar	
2004	Phir Milenge	Tamanna's friend	
2009	3 Idiots	Ragging Senior	
2012	Vettai	Gautham	
2012	English Vinglish	Ramamurthy	
2015	Shamitabh	Media reporter	
2015	Waiting	Girish	
2022	Rocketry: The Nambi Effect	Param	
2022	Chup: Revenge of the Artist	Srinivas Shetty	
2024	Raghu Thatha	Ashish Guptha	
2026	Boundaries †	Ravikant Shasthri	Also co-writer

=== Television ===
Year	Film	Role	Network
2024	Killer Soup	DSP Udaya Reddy	Netflix

== Plays ==
Sources

- Owl and the Pussy Cat
- Zoo Story
- Filth by Irvine Welsh
- Gentlemen
- God of Carnage
