= Siya (film) =

2022 film produced by Drishyam Films

- Directed by: Manish Mundra
- Written by: Manish Mundra; Haider Rizvi; Samah
- Dialogues by: Rashmi Somvanshi
- Produced by: Raghav Gupta
- Starring: Pooja Pandey; Vineet Kumar Singh; Ambrish Kumar Saxena; Rudra Chaudhary
- Cinematography: Rafey Mehmood; Subhransu
- Edited by: Manendra Singh Lodhi
- Music by: Songs: Rajarshi Sanyal; Score: Neel Adhikari
- Production companies: Drishyam Films; Panorama Studios
- Distributed by: ZEE5
- Release date: 16 September 2022
- Country: India
- Language: Hindi

Siya is a 2022 Indian Hindi-language crime drama film directed by Manish Mundra, in his directorial debut, and produced by his Drishyam Films. written by Haider Rizvi

== Plot ==
The film is about a small town girl, Siya who fought for justice against all odds and start protest against the vicious system.

== Cast ==
- Pooja Pandey as Siya
- Vineet Kumar Singh as Mahender
- Ambrish Kumar Saxena as Shankar Singh
- Rudra Chaudhary as Shankar
- Arsh Pnadey as Bachchan
- Purnima sharma Supporting Character
- Shubham Kumar as Deepak Tiwari
- Dev Chauhan as Inspector Pandey
- Rohit Pathak as MLA Arunoday singh
- Lajjawati Mishra as Daadi

== Release ==
The film had a limited theatrical release on 16 September 2022. The film is scheduled for a digital premiere on ZEE5 on 16 Jun.

== Critical reception ==
Shubhra Gupta, film critic of The Indian Express rated 2 out of 5 ratings, Nishtha Gautam of The Quint verdict the film 4 out of 5, Dhaval Roy of The Times of India rated 3.5 out of 6, Shilajit Mitra of The New Indian Express rated 2.5 out of 5 ratings and Prateek Sur of Outlook India rated 3.5 out of 5 ratings.

Subhash K. Jha, film critic of Firstpost wrote "Siya is not a film without virtues. But it’s a film without hope. And that defeats the very purpose of cinema.", Udita Jhunjhunwala of News9Live wrote "Manish Mundra’s directorial debut is well-intentioned but unsettled", Dishya Sharma of News18 India wrote the film as "Hard-Hitting Film About Rape Victim", Tanul Thakur of The Indian Wire wrote "An impressive film scoops out meanings from the real-life story itself.", Nairita Mukherjee of India Today wrote "Pooja Pandey, Vineet Singh's film is brutal and honest".

The film has been also reviewed by Mayank Shekhar, film critic of Mid-Day, Avinash Singh of Live Hindustan, Saibal Chatterjee of NDTV, Nandini Ramnath of Scroll.in and Anuj Kumar of The Hindu.
