= Bhool Chuk Maaf =

2025 Indian film by Karan Sharma

- Theatrical release poster
- Directed by: Karan Sharma
- Written by: Karan Sharma; Haider Rizvi
- Produced by: Dinesh Vijan
- Starring: Rajkummar Rao; Wamiqa Gabbi; Seema Pahwa; Sanjay Mishra; Raghubir Yadav; Zakir Hussain
- Cinematography: Sudeep Chatterjee
- Edited by: Manish Pradhan
- Music by: Score: Ketan Sodha; Songs: Tanishk Bagchi
- Production companies: Amazon MGM Studios; Maddock Films
- Distributed by: Pen Marudhar (India); Yash Raj Films (International)
- Release date: 23 May 2025
- Running time: 121 minutes
- Countries: India; United States
- Language: Hindi
- Budget: ₹50 crore
- Box office: ₹90.78 crore

Bhool Chuk Maaf (transl. Forgive my mistakes) is a 2025 Indian Hindi-language fantasy romantic comedy film written and directed by Karan Sharma, and produced by Dinesh Vijan under Maddock Films, in association with Amazon MGM Studios. The film stars Rajkummar Rao, Wamiqa Gabbi and Seema Pahwa in lead roles. The film was released on 23 May 2025 and received mixed reviews from critics.

== Plot ==
Titli Mishra and Ranjan Tiwari are lovers in Varanasi who are eager to marry, but Titli's father, Brijmohan Mishra, stipulates that Ranjan must have a government job in order to marry Titli. While searching for a job, Ranjan vows to perform a good deed if he secures a government position, and he eventually obtains one illegally by bribing a man named Bhagwan.

On the 29th of the month, the haldi ceremony takes place, with the wedding scheduled for the following day. However, after spending the day at the haldi ceremony, Ranjan wakes up to find himself reliving the same day and trapped in a time loop. It is later revealed that this is due to his unfulfilled vow, and Ranjan realises that he must perform a good deed to break the loop. He tries every possible way to do so, but nothing works, and he remains trapped on his haldi day. Eventually, he gives up and decides to commit suicide. Just before he jumps into the water, he meets a man named Hamid Ansari, who is also planning to kill himself because he is unemployed. Ranjan soon learns that Ansari is the candidate whose job was wrongfully given to him because of his bribe to Bhagwan, which is the reason he is trapped in the time loop. The good deed required to break the loop is to return the job to Ansari, but doing so would cost Ranjan both his job and his wedding to Titli.

The time loop still does not break. Every day, Ranjan sees Ansari committing suicide and saves him, but Ansari rejects every offer of a different job and continues to attempt suicide. Ranjan eventually discovers that Ansari wants the government job so desperately because he hopes to stop corruption and help his village obtain water and electricity connections.

The next morning, it is once again the 29th, and Ansari, now alive, gives Ranjan the opportunity to rectify his wrongdoing. Ranjan finally returns the job to Ansari, and the time loop is broken. Everyone, unaware of Ranjan's unemployment, begins preparing for the wedding. However, Ranjan calls off the wedding and tells everyone that he has given up his job, drawing criticism from all around him, including from Titli. Bhagwan then arrives and delivers an eye-opening speech about humanity, supporting Ranjan's decision to give the job to Ansari. Titli agrees to marry Ranjan, and the two are finally wed.

== Cast ==
- Rajkummar Rao as Ranjan Tiwari
- Wamiqa Gabbi as Titli Mishra
- Sanjay Mishra as Bhagwan Das
- Zakir Hussain as Brijmohan Mishra, Titli's father
- Raghubir Yadav as Raghunath Tiwari, Ranjan's father
- Seema Pahwa as Ramawati Tiwari, Ranjan's mother
- Ishtiyak Khan as Kishan, Ranjan's maternal uncle
- Purnima Sharma as Sweety
- Anubha Fatehpuria as Anandi
- Vineet Kumar as Panditji
- Jay Thakkar as Sushil
- Pragati Mishra as Keri Tiwari, Ranjan's younger sister
- Dheerendra Gautam as Hari, Ranjan's friend
- Akash Makhija as Hamid Ansari
- Dhanashree Verma as Jugni (special appearance in the song "Ting Ling Sajna")

== Production ==
=== Development ===
Earlier, reports suggested that Kartik Aaryan and Shraddha Kapoor would star in the film. However, Aaryan later dismissed these claims on Twitter, calling them rumours with no truth.

In April 2024, Maddock Films officially announced its lineup for 2024 and 2025, including this project. Directed by Karan Sharma, this marks his second collaboration with Maddock Films after the upcoming romantic drama Shiddat 2, where Wamiqa Gabbi stars opposite Sunny Kaushal.

=== Casting ===
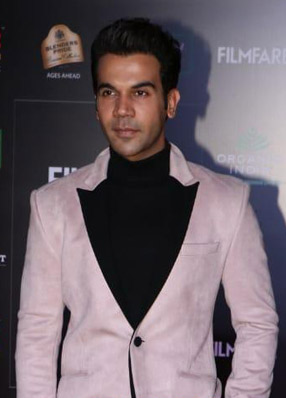
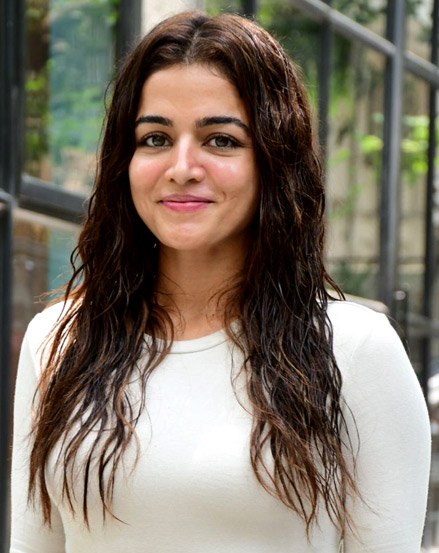
Rajkummar Rao (left) playing the lead role, alongside Wamiqa Gabbi (right).

Rajkummar Rao and Wamiqa Gabbi play the lead roles in the film. This marked Rao's sixth collaboration with Maddock Films, following his work on Stree, Made in China, Roohi, Hum Do Hamare Do, and Stree 2. Seema Pahwa played an important role in the film. In February 2025, it was reported that Jay Thakkar joined the cast.

The film also features Sanjay Mishra, Zakir Hussain, and Raghubir Yadav in pivotal roles.

=== Filming ===
On 2 January 2024, Rao and Gabbi arrived in Varanasi to commence shooting. On 29 March 2025, they filmed a sequence at a studio in Mira Road, where a set resembling a small-town street was built for a lively promotional song. The track, composed by Tanishk Bagchi, features choreography by Vijay Ganguly and styling by Sheetal Sharma. Another song was filmed in Varanasi in mid-April.

== Soundtrack ==
Bhool Chuk Maaf

Soundtrack album by Tanishk Bagchi
- Released: 23 May 2025
- Recorded: 2024–2025
- Genre: Feature film soundtrack
- Length: 22:42
- Language: Hindi
- Label: Sony Music India

Tanishk Bagchi chronology
Ground Zero (2025)	Bhool Chuk Maaf (2025)	Tehran (2025)

The film's soundtrack was composed by Tanishk Bagchi, written by Irshad Kamil, Shaan Yadav and Armaan Lahoria while the background score is composed by Ketan Sodha.

The song "Waalian" by Harnoor is recreated for the film and the song was titled "Koi Na" was released on 16 April 2025. Originally lyrics written by Gifty.

The song "Chor Bazaari Phir Se" from the 2009 film Love Aaj Kal, composed by Pritam and sung by Neeraj Shridhar and Sunidhi Chauhan is recreated for the film. The song "Allah Meherban" from the 2013 film Ghanchakkar, sung by Divya Kumar and composed by Amit Trivedi is re-used in the film.

Track listing
No.	Title	Singer(s)	Length
1.	"Koi Naa"	Harnoor, Shreya Ghoshal	3:41
2.	"Chor Bazari Phir Se"	Neeraj Shridhar, Sunidhi Chauhan, Zahrah S. Khan, Pravesh Mallick	3:01
3.	"Sawariya Tera"	Raghav Chaitanya, Varun Jain, Suvarna Tiwari, Pravesh Mallick, Priyanka Sarkaar	2:45
4.	"Ting Ling Sajna"	Madhubanti Bagchi, Tanishk Bagchi	2:51
5.	"Ganga Kinare"	Jubin Nautiyal	4:19
6.	"Hutt Badmaash" (lyrics by Shaan Yadav)	Noor Singh (Chidi), Pravesh Mallick	2:39
7.	"Maahi Mera" (lyrics by Armaan Lahoria)	Suvarna Tiwari	3:26
Total length:			22:42

== Marketing ==
The first teaser was released on 18 February 2025. On 10 April 2025, the trailer was launched in a press conference, held in Mumbai. On April 25, 2025, a promotional event for the film took place at Raj Mandir Cinema in Jaipur, featuring RajKummar Rao and Wamiqa Gabbi. As part of their promotional campaign, the duo also visited Lucknow. On April 30, 2025, they made an appearance on the sets of Hip Hop India Season 2. On 19 May 2025, pre-release event was held at Film and Television Institute of India in Pune.

== Release ==
The film was set to release in theatres on 9 May 2025. However it was postponed to 16 May 2025 for a direct-to-streaming release on Amazon Prime Video, with the makers citing the 2025 India–Pakistan conflict as a reason. After over 5000 tickets were sold via ticket sales from booking counters and online outlets clocking over Rs 3 crores in ticket sales, it resulted in backlash from distributors and film exhibitors. As a result, PVR INOX filed a lawsuit against Maddock Films for cancelling the theatrical release at the eleventh hour and moving it to a digital platform, alleging that the last-minute cancellation led to substantial financial losses.

On 9 May 2025, the Bombay High Court granted ad-interim relief to PVR INOX and restrained Maddock Films from releasing the film on any streaming or non-theatrical platform until the 8-week holdback period expired following its first theatrical release in India.

On 14 May 2025, Maddock Films and PVR INOX mutually decided the film would have a theatrical release in theatres on 23 May 2025 and after two weeks of theatrical run, it began streaming on Amazon Prime Video from 6 June 2025.

== Reception ==
On the review aggregator website Rotten Tomatoes, 27% of 11 critics' reviews are positive, with an average rating of 5/10. Saibal Chatterjee of NDTV gave 2 stars out of 5 and said that "as a time-loop comedy, it goes completely overboard with its central premise without being able to create a logical context for the perplexing goings-on in the life of a lad trapped in a limbo." Shalini Langer of The Indian Express awarded 2 stars out of 5 and writes that "Despite its cast including good actors like Rajkummar Rao and Wamiqa Gabbi, the film feels like such a stew of Ghat meets Groundhog Day." Rishabh Suri of Hindustan Times rated 2.5/5 stars and commented that "Bhool Chuk Maaf, a time-loop comedy, ends up stuck in a loop of its own clichés. The only thing harder to escape than a time loop is Rajkummar’s contract with small-town scripts. It tries to be a comedy, flirts with a social message, and ends up being the cinematic equivalent of a WhatsApp forward — familiar, repetitive, and mildly amusing at best."

Rahul Desai of The Hollywood Reporter India writes in his review that "As a time-loop film, it’s tempting to notice the irony of literally going around in circles and arriving back at the same preachy disappointment. The same formula is repeated again and again and again. The same signs are elicited with Groundhog Day-level grit. It’s all designed, of course. The boys played well for charity. And ethical match-fixing reaches a whole new level." Anuj Kumar of The Hindu observed that "Writer-director Karan Sharma makes us take a leap of faith in a sharp social commentary disguised as a frothy comedy." Renuka Vyavahare of The Times of India rated 3/5 stars and said that "the film delivers a relevant message in a deceptive manner. The film addresses growing apathy, isolated existence and self-centric living."

Vineeta Kumar of India Today gave 1.5 stars out of 5 and said that "In 'Bhool Chuk Maaf', pregnancy jokes and outdated concepts of love are given way more importance than an attempt at bringing a progressive story from the heartland of India. Even Rajkummar Rao can't save this lost in a loop, lacking in love film." Uday Bhatia of Mint said that "‘Bhool Chuk Maaf is a stale, derivative time-loop comedy". Abhishek Srivastava of Moneycontrol rated 2.5/5 stars and said that "The film leans on a tired formula and ends up feeling more routine than refreshing."

Subhash K Jha writing for News 24 gave 3.5 stars out of 5 five and said "If cinema is a place to have a good time, then writer-director Karan Sharma’s Bhool Chuk Maaf is just the place where you ought to be seen this weekend. It is fun and funny. Feisty and ritzy." Kartik Bhardwaj of The New Indian Express rated 2/5 stars and said "Bhool Chuk Maaf felt like a déjà vu, it has all happened before: these ghats of Banaras, these accented wisecracks, these actors who act like they were born to be sidekicks. It’s a rerun."

== See also ==
- List of films featuring time loops
