= Love Hostel =

2022 Indian film by Shanker Raman

- Official release poster
- Directed by: Shanker Raman
- Written by: Shanker Raman; Mehak Jamal; Yogi Singha
- Screenplay by: Shanker Raman
- Produced by: Gauri Khan; Manish Mundra; Gaurav Verma
- Starring: Vikrant Massey; Sanya Malhotra; Bobby Deol
- Cinematography: Vivek Shah
- Edited by: Nitin Baid; Shan Mohammed
- Music by: Score: Clinton Cerejo; Songs: Jeet Gannguli; Clinton Cerejo; Bianca Gomes
- Production companies: Red Chillies Entertainment; Drishyam Films
- Distributed by: ZEE5
- Release date: 25 February 2022
- Running time: 100 minutes
- Country: India
- Language: Hindi

Love Hostel is a 2022 Indian Hindi-language romantic thriller film written and directed by Shanker Raman and produced by Red Chillies Entertainment and Drishyam Films. It stars Vikrant Massey, Sanya Malhotra and Bobby Deol. The film was released directly on ZEE5 on 25 February 2022.

== Plot ==
Completely in love, Ahmed Shaukeen and Jyoti Dilawar have chosen to spend the rest of their lives together. Aware that their families will not approve as they each come from a different religion, the couple decides to elope and wed in secret. This decision puts them in danger as they are now being brutally hunted by Viraj Singh Dagar, a ruthless ex-convict hitman who will not stop until he has found and "corrected" them.

== Cast ==
- Vikrant Massey as Ahmed Shaukeen
- Sanya Malhotra as Jyoti Dilawar
- Bobby Deol as Viraj Singh Dagar
- Raj Arjun as DCP Sushil Rathi
- Yudhvir Ahlawat as Rakesh Dilawar
- Simran Rawal as Babli Dilawar
- Aditi Vasudev as Nidhi Dahiya
- Yogesh Tiwari as Randhir Dilawar (Jyoti's Father)
- Kumkum Jain as Savita Dilawar (Jyoti's Mother)
- Sonal Jha as Sujata Rathi (DCP's wife)
- Swaroopa Ghosh as MLA Kamala Dilawar
- Akshay Oberoi as Diler
- Vishal O Sharma as advocate

== Production ==
Plans to create Love Hostel were first announced in October 2020. Shanker Raman wrote the script for Love Hostel, with the plans that he would also serve as the film's director. While writing the script and developing the movie he focused on "questions of the heart and the mind" and also focused on questioning "what our society has become but also the paths we take to solve our problems". The film also focuses on honor killings. Vikrant Massey and Sanya Malhotra were brought in to portray two of the film's central characters and principal photography began on 23 February 2021 in Punjab's Patiala district. Gauri Khan, Gaurav Verma, and Manish Mundra served as producers and the film was created as a joint production between Red Chillies Entertainment and Drishyam Films.

Bobby Deol was also confirmed as performing in the film. He was initially reluctant to come on to the production. Raman and his crew rewrote the script in hopes of appealing to the actor, who agreed to join the cast upon reading this second draft. The director has stated that these changes "elevated the emotional quotient of the film". In an article dated prior to the film's release Deol described his character as "a very interesting character that has quite a twisted journey" and that the character's actions were caused by something that "happened one day that changed him completely. So now whatever he does, he does it in his righteous way." The film's script called for his character to chew tobacco, which required Deol to chew on a piece of cotton for scenes where Dagar is chewing and speaking.

Filming was temporarily halted due to local farmers protesting the 2020 Indian agriculture acts. The farmers stated that they were unhappy that Deol's family did not voice their support for the protest. Several other protestors had similarly disrupted a shoot on another film the previous month. Filming was stopped one additional time by the protestors before it was able to commence. Filming wrapped up on 31 July 2021. Sanya Malhotra commented that making the film was emotional and tough for all of them due to film's themes and plot, further remarking that she had trouble sleeping during filming.

== Release ==
Love Hostel premiered on ZEE5 on 25 February 2022. The Indian Express wrote favorably about the trailer, stating that the movie "promises to be a compelling romantic drama with a gruesome crime angle." GQ India called the trailer one of the "best trailers of 2022 (so far)".

== Soundtrack ==
Love Hostel

Soundtrack album by Jeet Gannguli, Clinton Cerejo and Bianca Gomes
- Released: 28 February 2022
- Recorded: 2021
- Genre: Feature film soundtrack
- Length: 13:10
- Language: Hindi
- Label: Zee Music Company

Official audio
- Love Hostel - Full Album on YouTube

The music of the film is composed by Jeet Gannguli, Clinton Cerejo and Bianca Gomes with lyrics written by Manoj Yadav and Siddhant Kaushal.

Track listing
No.	Title	Lyrics	Music	Singer(s)	Length
1.	"Chali Aa"	Manoj Yadav	Jeet Gannguli	Raj Burman	3:14
2.	"Bas Mein Nahi"	Siddhant Kaushal	Clinton Cerejo, Bianca Gomes	Clinton Cerejo	2:35
3.	"Dagar's Theme"	Instrumental	Clinton Cerejo	Instrumental	2:35
4.	"Bas Mein Nahi" (Reprise)	Siddhant Kaushal	Clinton Cerejo, Bianca Gomes	Bianca Gomes	3:03
5.	"Dirty Dagar"	Instrumental	Clinton Cerejo	Instrumental	1:43
Total length:					13:10

== Reception ==
Shantanu Ray Chaudhuri of The Free Press Journal gave the film a rating of 4/5 and wrote "Bobby Deol a standout – this is a frighteningly dystopian look at a land that's no country for young lovers". Saibal Chatterjee of NDTV gave the film a rating of 4/5 and wrote "We haven't seen anything as fearless and powerful as Love Hostel in a long, long time and Bobby Deol renders an emotionless killer to perfection". Stutee Ghosh of The Quint gave the film a rating of 4.5/5 and wrote "Vikrant and Sanya's outstanding performances are complimented admirably by Bobby Deol. What a triumph for Shankar Raman who keeps getting better". Shubhra Gupta of The Indian Express gave the film a rating of 3.5/5 and wrote "As compared to Shanker Raman's 'Gurgaon', 'Love Hostel' has more immediacy in its execution, which makes its nonstop violence more impactful". Sukanya Verma of Rediff gave the film a rating of 3.5/5 and wrote "It's a lawless, ruthless, endless minefield where uncertainty and bigotry go hand in hand and patriarchy is a foregone conclusion".

Anna MM Vetticad of Firstpost gave the film a rating of 3/5 and wrote "Love Hostel's pluses and minuses is put in the shade though by its complete lack of prevarication in its representation of India's ongoing war against love". Rachana Dubey of The Times of India gave the film a rating of 2.5/5 and wrote "Sanya, Vikrant and Bobby put out honest performances.Dubey stated that while the direction was good, writer could have been better". Hindustan Times critic Devarsi Ghosh also echoed the same, calling it "well-directed but badly written thriller." Sowmya Rajendran of The News Minute compared the film with NH10 (2015) and Sairat (2016) and stated, "Love Hostel oscillates between sparks of good writing and a lack of imagination in developing the plot." Terming it an "unlikely thriller about honour killing," Nandini Ramnath of Scroll.in and wondered "Whether Love Hostel works as an expose of the culture of honour killing is always up for debate."

== Awards ==
Zee Cine Awards 2023:

- Best Actor In A Negative Role (Won) – Bobby Deol
