= Smita Tambe =

Indian actress (born 1983)

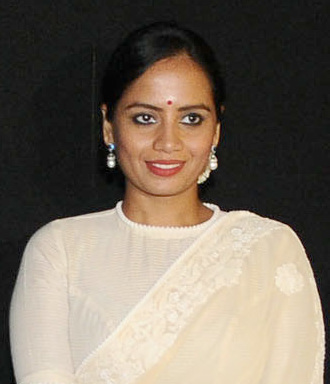
- Tambe in 2017
- Born: 11 May 1983 (age 43); Satara, Maharashtra, India
- Occupations: Actor, Entertainer
- Spouse: Virendra Dwivedi (m. 2019)

Smita Tambe is a Marathi and Hindi film, television and stage actor. She is known for her work in 72 Miles for which is won Maharashtra state award for best actress.

== Early life ==
Tambe was born in Satara, Maharashtra. She was brought up in Pune, and moved to Mumbai to pursue a career in Marathi films and television. She also pursued a PhD in Marathi Loksahitya and Samaj.

== Career ==
She had a brief role in Jogwa in 2009, and her first lead role was in Akshay Kumar's Marathi movie 72 Miles-Ek Pravas. She also owns the production house Ringing Rain, which produced Saavat in 2019. She appeared in the projects Hawa Badle Hassu, Sacred Games (Season 2) and Panga. In 2023, she appeared in the Hindi action film Jawan.

Her next upcoming film is Bharat Bhhagya Viddhaata, to be released on 09 June 2026. It has been written and directed by Manoj Tapadia. The principal actors of this film are Kangana Ranaut, Girija Oak and Tambe.

== Filmography ==
=== Films ===
Year	Movie	Character	Language	Notes
2006	Naatigoti	Suman P. Rao	Marathi	
2007	It's Breaking News	Mrs. P. Gupta	Marathi	
2009	Jogwa	Phula	Marathi	
2010	Aaghaat	Kalpana Budhkar	Marathi	
2010	Sasar Maze Daivat	Neha	Marathi	
2011	Deool	Herself	Marathi	Special appearance in song "Welcome Ho Raya"
2012	Tukaram	Manjula	Marathi	
2013	72 Miles	Radhakka	Marathi	
2013	Vanshvel	Herself	Marathi	Special appearance in song "Ambe Krupa Kari"
2014	Candle March	Shabana	Marathi	
2014	Mahaguru		Marathi	
2014	Singham Returns	Usha Jadhav	Hindi	
2015	Laathi		Marathi	
2015	Partu	Sugandha	Marathi	Nominated Filmfare Award for Best Supporting Actress – Marathi
2015	Bioscope		Marathi	
2015	Umrika	Uday's mother	Hindi	
2016	Ganvesh	Bai	Marathi	
2017	Ajji	Mother	Hindi	
2017	Rukh	Nandini	Hindi	
2017	Noor	Malti	Hindi	
2017	Kiss Kiss Ka Kissa	Shalaka	Hindi	
2018	Double Game		Hindi	
2018	Truckbhar Swapna	Jyoti	Marathi	
2018	State Vs. Malti Mhaske	Adv. Tara Kamble	Marathi	
2019	Saavat	ACP Aditi Deshpande	Marathi	Also co-produced the movie.
2020	Panga	Smita Dwivedi (Indian Team Captain)	Hindi	
2020	Hawa Badle Hassu	Arti	Hindi	Web Series on Sony Liv
2020	My Name is Sheela	Sheela	Hindi	Web series on Eros Now
2020	Sacred Games (Season 2)	ATS Analyst Rama	Hindi	Netflix Show
2022	Hadal	Chandra Jadhav	Marathi	
2023	Yashwant	Jaywanti	Marathi	Film by Piyush Vijay Bhonde
2023	Jawan	Kalki's Mother	Hindi	
2023	Joram	Phulo Karma	Hindi	
2023	Gaurichya Lagnala Yaycha Ha	Smita	Marathi	
2024	Kaasra	Anju	Marathi	
2024	Babu	Charusheela Tandel	Marathi	
2024	Sister Midnight	Reshma	Hindi	
2025	Jai Kissan	Anju	Kannada	
2026	Ladki Bahin	Uma	Marathi	
2026	Shree Baba Neeb Karori Maharaj	Kamala Mukherjee	Hindi	
2026	Bharat Bhhagya Viddhaata	Trupti Takle	Hindi	
2026	Udta Teer	Holkar	Hindi	

=== Television ===
Year	Serial	Role	Ref.
2009-2010	Anubandh	Supporting Role	
2020-2021	Ladachi Mi Lek Ga!	Kamini Satam (Mummy)	
2024	Murder In Mahim	Kalpana Jhende	

== Personal life ==
Tambe married theatre artist Virendra Dwivedi in 2019.
