= Anu Menon =

Indian film director and screenwriter

- Education: BITS, Pilani; London Film School
- Years active: 2012–present

Anu Menon is an Indian film director and screenwriter. She has directed movies such as London, Paris, New York (2012), Waiting (2016) and worked with non-mainstream actors like Suhasini Maniratnam and Kalki Koechlin. Menon is a graduate of London Film School.

== Biography ==
Anu grew up in Delhi, studied in KV Andrews Ganj. She got her bachelor's in engineering at BITS Pilani and worked in advertising. She attended a workshop at NYFA and later enrolled for a filmmaking course at London Film School.

Early in her career, she made short films Ravi Goes To School, and Baby, a documentary on a Bengali domestic help who wrote a bestseller. Her debut film was a romantic comedy London, Paris, New York (2012) starring Ali Zafar and Aditi Rao Hydari, The second movie Waiting (2016) featured Kalki Koechlin and Naseeruddin Shah, was produced by Ishka Films and Drishyam Films. Menon was also part of a team of directors who worked on a collaborative project called X: Past Is Present in which she directed a segment called Oysters.

Anupama Menon (nee Balakrishnan) is married and her husband is from Kerala they have a daughter called Rhea Menon.

== Filmography ==
Short film

| Year | Title | Director | Writer | Notes |
|---|---|---|---|---|
| 2007 | Ravi Goes to School | Yes | Yes | |
| 2015 | Oysters | Yes | Yes | Segment of X: Past Is Present |

Feature film

| Year | Title | Director | Writer |
|---|---|---|---|
| 2012 | London, Paris, New York | Yes | Story |
| 2016 | Waiting | Yes | Yes |
| 2020 | Shakuntala Devi | Yes | Yes |
| 2023 | Neeyat | Yes | Yes |

Television

| Year | Title | Notes |
|---|---|---|
| 2019 | Four More Shots Please! | Season 1 |
| 2022 | Killing Eve | 2 episodes |
| 2023 | The Winter King | 2 episodes |
| 2024 | The Day of the Jackal | 2 episodes |
| 2026 | Avatar: The Last Airbender | 2 episodes |
