= Masaan =

2015 Indian film by Neeraj Ghaywan

- Film poster
- Directed by: Neeraj Ghaywan
- Written by: Varun Grover
- Produced by: Drishyam Films; Phantom Films; Macassar Productions; Sikhya Entertainment; Kanchan Chandnani
- Starring: Richa Chadda; Vicky Kaushal; Shweta Tripathi; Sanjay Mishra
- Cinematography: Avinash Arun
- Edited by: Nitin Baid
- Music by: Songs: Indian Ocean; Background Score: Bruno Coulais; Passerelle
- Production companies: Drishyam Films; Phantom Films; Macassar Productions; Sikhya Entertainment; Pathé; Arte France Cinéma
- Distributed by: AA Films
- Release dates: 19 May 2015 (Cannes); 24 June 2015 (France); 24 July 2015 (India)
- Running time: 109 minutes
- Country: India
- Language: Hindi

Masaan (transl. 'Crematorium'; also known as Fly Away Solo in English) is a 2015 Indian Hindi-language independent drama film starring Richa Chadda and Vicky Kaushal in lead roles. It is Kaushal's debut Hindi film, and also the directorial debut of Neeraj Ghaywan. It is an Indo-French co-production by Drishyam Films, Macassar Productions, Phantom Films, Sikhya Entertainment, Arte France Cinéma and Pathé Productions.

The film was screened in the Un Certain Regard section at the 2015 Cannes Film Festival winning two awards. it was screened at the inaugural New York Dalit Film and Cultural Festival in 2019 along with Pariyerum Perumal (2018), Kaala (2018) and Fandry (2013). Since its release in 2015, the film has gone on to achieve cult status.

== Plot ==
In Varanasi, Devi Pathak, a computer training center instructor, and her student, Piyush Aggarwal, are caught by the local police during a consensual sexual encounter in a hotel room. Seeking to extort the couple, Inspector Mishra records a video of a barely clad Devi. Terrified by police threats and the impending public shame, Piyush locks himself in the bathroom and commits suicide by slitting his wrists. Mishra uses the tragedy to blackmail Devi’s father, Vidyadhar Pathak, a low-income Sanskrit professor who runs a small bookshop. Mishra demands a bribe of ₹3 lakh to withhold an abetment of suicide charge against Devi. Desperate to raise the money, Pathak reluctantly exploits Jhonta, a young boy who works at his shop, by allowing him to participate in dangerous, local coin-diving betting games in the Ganges River. Meanwhile, Devi faces pervasive social ostracization and workplace harassment as rumors of the incident spread. She eventually secures a temporary job with the Indian Railways and vows to move to Allahabad to pursue higher education once her father pays off the corrupt inspector.

Simultaneously, Deepak Kumar, a young man from the marginalized Dom caste, lives at the cremation ghats where his family performs hereditary funeral rites. Determined to escape this cycle, Deepak studies civil engineering at a local polytechnic college. He falls deeply in love with Shaalu Gupta, a high-caste Hindu girl. Despite the immense societal divide, they form a deep connection. When Deepak honestly confesses his caste and his family's line of work, Shaalu remains undeterred, promising to elope with him if her conservative parents reject the match, while urging him to focus on his upcoming examinations. Tragedy strikes when Shaalu and her family go on a pilgrimage; their bus crashes, killing her instantly. Her body is brought to Deepak's cremation ghat, leaving him utterly devastated. Plunged into profound grief, Deepak eventually channels his pain into his studies, graduates, and lands a secure engineering position with the Indian Railways in Allahabad.

Back in Varanasi, Pathak risks ₹10,000 of his remaining savings on Jhonta during a high-stakes diving competition. The boy nearly drowns, prompting a guilt-ridden Pathak to vow never to gamble with the child's life again. Upon recovering in the hospital, Jhonta reveals he salvaged a gold ring from the riverbed—coincidentally the very ring Shaalu wore, which a grieving Deepak had thrown into the Ganges. Pathak sells the ring, successfully liquidating the final installment of Mishra’s bribe. Before departing the city, Devi attempts to find closure by visiting Piyush's grieving father, who violently rejects her. She walks to the banks of the Ganges to immerse a gift Piyush had given her. Deepak, also waiting by the riverbank to leave for his new life, notices her crying and gently offers her a bottle of water. As a boatman calls out, both Devi and Deepak board the vessel together, striking up a conversation as they float toward the Sangam in Allahabad to begin anew.

== Themes ==
Masaan, a film about characters locked in the cycle of pain and salvation, depicts the existential problem expressed in the above phrase. While Varun Grover's screenplay has a poetic-realism feel to it, the film's mise-en-scene and other filmic aspects as sound, cinematography, and even casting choices assist to accentuate the film's key themes. 'Masaan,' a story about characters afflicted by various disasters, thematically explores concerns about suffering, agony, and redemption. The title, which means crematorium, and the setting hint to the film's themes of entropy, destruction, and resurrection. Masaan is set in Varanasi, historic centre of spirituality and redemption, which is portrayed as a storehouse of antiquated values and a boiling pot of unsatisfied ambitions.

Two paths are intertwined, one in sorrow and the other in optimism. Devi (Richa Chadha) has an "inappropriate rendezvous" in her budding relationship with her love interest, which leads to blackmail and harassment from a police officer (Bhagwan Tiwari) as well as the quiet fury of her father Pathak (Sanjay Mishra). Even as Devi retreats into a catatonic shell, Pathak takes tiny and major risks to maintain his honour, aided by the energetic Jhonta (Nikhil Sahni), a child who works for him.

Meanwhile, Deepak (Vicky Kaushal) has begun his trek out of the Varanasi cremation grounds, a caste-ordained purgatory where his Dom family has been sweeping embers over remains for years.

== Cast ==
- Richa Chadda as Devi Pathak
- Vicky Kaushal as Deepak Kumar
- Shweta Tripathi as Shaalu Gupta
- Sanjay Mishra as Vidyadhar Pathak
- Pankaj Tripathi as Sadhya
- Rohit Saraf as Parul
- Bhagwan Tiwari as Inspector Mishra
- Nikhil Sahni as Jhonta
- Vineet Kumar as Dom Raja
- Shree Dhar Dubey as KK
- Satya Kam Anand as Vikram Mallah
- Amitabh Bachchan as a Poet
- Niharica Raizada in a special appearance

== Soundtrack ==
Masaan: Original Motion Picture Soundtrack

Soundtrack album by Indian Ocean
- Released: 7 June 2015
- Genre: Feature film soundtrack
- Length: 18:07
- Language: Hindi
- Label: Zee Music Company
External audio
- Audio Jukebox on YouTube

The music for Masaan's songs was composed by Indian Ocean and the lyrics were written by Varun Grover. The album received positive reviews from critics.

The film contains various examples of Urdu & Hindi poetry at different junctures including works by Akbar Allahabadi, Basheer Badr, Brij Narayan Chakbast, Mirza Ghalib, Uday Prakash and Dushyant Kumar. Explaining this as a conscious tribute, the film's lyricist Varun Grover explained that he wanted to show Shaalu (played by Shweta Tripathi) as a person whose hobby is to read Hindi poetry and shaayari, as this is a common hobby of millennial and generation x youngsters in Northern India, especially when in love, but this aspect is rarely shown in Hindi films.

The song ("Tu Kisi Rail Si") is based on the work of the poet Dushyant Kumar.

Masaan (Original Motion Picture Soundtrack)
No.	Title	Lyrics	Singer(s)	Length
1.	"Tu Kisi Rail Si"	Varun Grover (Adapted from a poem by Dushyant Kumar)	Swanand Kirkire, Amitabh Bachchan	03:50
2.	"Mann Kasturi"	Sanjeev Sharma, Varun Grover	Amit Kilam	07:13
3.	"Bhor"	Sanjeev Sharma	Amit Kilam, Rahul Ram and Himanshu Joshi	07:00

== Reception ==
=== Critical response ===
Masaan received overwhelming critical acclaim from the mainstream media. On the review aggregator website Rotten Tomatoes, the film holds an approval rating of 93% based on 15 reviews, with an average rating of 7.8/10.

Calling it "a very engaging debut" by Neeraj Ghaywan, Allan Hunter in Screen Daily wrote, "Vicky Kaushal brings a gauche charm to Deepak and Richa Chadda invests the long suffering Devi with a weary, unwavering determination to move forward. Cinematographer Avinash Arun Dhaware captures some fantastic images of Banares that convey the bustling spirit of the city from the brightly lit street markets to the flurry of sparks that dot the night sky from the funeral pyres." Deborah Young writing in The Hollywood Reporter described the film as "a classically poignant drama of star-crossed love" and "part of the new generation of indie films whose clear intent is to set ablaze a hidebound society’s constrictions on personal liberty." Jay Weissberg in his review for the Variety magazine, however, found it "a heartfelt yet overambitious tale of class and gender inequality" with the director failing to find "ways to overcome script and editing weaknesses, resulting in a disappointing drama."

Senior journalist Shekhar Gupta wrote in his National Interest column that Masaan left a deep impression on him, "get[ting] the pulse of small-town India as no other I have seen." The director has woven Ganga intimately into Varun Grover's tight screenplay, Gayatri Gauri wrote in First Post adding "Several crucial moments swirl around the Ganga, beautifully shot without succumbing to visual exotica, and after you leave the cinema, they linger in your memory, like the flames dying slowly in the cremation grounds where so much of Masaan unfurls."

Shubhra Gupta wrote in The Indian Express, "Masaan is imbued with a sense of place and time, poetry and lyricism, and it captures the essence of Banaras, constant-yet-changeable, with felicity and feel. It also announces the arrival of new talents in its writer and director: Grover’s story is eminently worth telling, and Ghaywan tells it beautifully." "Ghaywan, in his very first film, creates a deeply affecting world that devastates and uplifts at the same time, and that becomes a part of your world long after the film is over," wrote Nikhil Taneja reviewing the film for The Huffington Post.

== Controversy ==
The film released for streaming on Hotstar was found to be heavily censored, which caused a controversy involving the streaming platform and the producers of the film.

== Accolades ==
Award Ceremony / Film Festival	Date	Category / Section	Recipient(s)	Ref.
Cannes Film Festival	13 – 24 May 2015	FIPRESCI Prize (Un Certain Regard)	Neeraj Ghaywan	
Cannes Film Festival	13 – 24 May 2015	Prix de l'Avenir (Un Certain Regard)	Neeraj Ghaywan	
Producers Guild Film Awards	1 January 2016	Most Promising Debut Director	Neeraj Ghaywan	
22nd Screen Awards	8 January 2016	Most Promising Newcomer - Male	Vicky Kaushal	
61st Filmfare Awards	15 January 2016	Best Debut Director	Neeraj Ghaywan	
Zee Cine Awards	20 February 2016	Best Debutant Male	Vicky Kaushal	
Zee Cine Awards	20 February 2016	Best Debutant Director	Neeraj Ghaywan	
Zee Cine Awards	20 February 2016	Best Actor in Supporting Role	Sanjay Mishra	
Zee Cine Awards	20 February 2016	Best Actress in Supporting Role	Shweta Tripathi	
Zee Cine Awards	20 February 2016	Best Editing	Nitin Baid	
63rd National Film Awards	3 May 2016	Best Debut Film of a Director	Neeraj Ghaywan	
Stardust Awards	19 December 2016	Editor's Choice Performer of the Year (Female)	Richa Chadda	
Stardust Awards	19 December 2016	Best Screenplay	Varun Grover	
Stardust Awards	19 December 2016	Best Lyricist	Varun Grover	
