= London, Paris, New York =

2012 film by Anuradha Menon

- Theatrical release poster
- Directed by: Anu Menon
- Screenplay by: Ritu Bhatia
- Story by: Anu Menon
- Produced by: Goldie Behl; Shrishti Arya
- Starring: Ali Zafar; Aditi Rao Hydari
- Cinematography: Sameer Arya
- Edited by: Shyam Salgaonkar
- Music by: Original Songs: Ali Zafar; Background Score: Dhruv Ghanekar
- Production company: Rose Movies
- Distributed by: Fox Star Studios
- Release date: 2 March 2012
- Running time: 100 minutes
- Country: India
- Language: Hindi

London, Paris, New York also known by the initialism LPNY, is 2012 Indian Hindi-language romantic comedy film written and directed by Anu Menon, with Ali Zafar and Aditi Rao Hydari in the lead roles. The official theatrical trailer was released on 14 January 2012 while the film was released worldwide on 2 March 2012, to positive reviews. Made on a budget of ₹70 million including promotional costs, the film earned ₹ 240 million. The film earned Rs. 64.3 million in first week in domestic box office and Rs. 90 million lifetime. In overseas too it was a winner and earned Rs. 20 million in first week and Rs. 40 million lifetime.

== Plot ==
In New York, a reporter asks filmmaker Nikhil Chopra about his newly directed movie and why he chose such a serious subject. He responds that he was asked by someone to be true to himself, and this movie shows the biggest truth about him. He then receives a message and rushes outside to catch a cab.

In the cab, he remembers how he met Lalitha at the London airport in 2005. She misses her connecting flight to New York and bumps into Nikhil while collecting her luggage. They instantly strike a chord and decide to explore London as both of them do not want to head away to their homes but wish to enjoy their first day of freedom. During the day, they roam around London, explore tourist locales, get drenched in rain and discuss personal ambitions. As the day ends, Nikhil and Lalitha become close but Lalitha declares that she cannot have a long distance relationship with him. While parting ways, Nikhil buys a ticket for himself and tells Lalitha that he will meet her in New York City in six months. She says that they should not write to each other and he agrees to meet her at the New York airport.

After two years, Nikhil rushes to Paris when he finds out that Lalitha has come there for an exchange program. It is revealed that Nikhil could never make it to New York as he had promised Lalitha. Lalitha is at first angry with Nikhil for ditching her, but soon she makes peace with the fact and they set out roaming the streets of Paris. They still feel the same attraction for each other and end up spending the night together in Nikhil's hotel. Nikhil admits that he is in love with Lalitha. They start out to watch the film he has made for his course but Lalitha is unable to control her emotions on seeing it.

It is revealed that Lalitha had actually taken a trip back to London when she also realized that she was in love with Nikhil. However, she finds him in bed with his film's actress which breaks her heart. She resolves to get even with Nikhil if given a chance. Realizing that Nikhil is in love with her, she breaks his heart too and leaves for New York.

The film moves forward to present day when Nikhil lands outside Lalitha's house. They go together for a cab ride in New York City. Lalitha tells him that she will marry an American and relocate to Mumbai. Nikhil tries his best to win Lalitha's heart. Lalitha also apologizes for breaking his heart. They again spend the night together on the streets.

However, as morning arrives, Lalitha starts rushing for her wedding which leaves Nikhil heartbroken again as he had thought he had won back Lalitha. He takes out his anger on her, explaining how she had been all wrong in this relationship. Lalitha leaves for her house. Nikhil rushes first to the church where Lalitha was getting married and then to her house only to learn that Lalitha had called off her marriage. They meet again outside her house and decide to spend the rest of their lives together.

== Cast ==
- Ali Zafar as Nikhil Chopra
- Aditi Rao Hydari as Lalitha Krishnan
- Dalip Tahil as Mr. Krishnan, Lalitha's father
- Mantra as Monty (cameo)
- Siddhant Ghegadmal as Rushi
- Marie Lisa-Claire Hamilton as herself at London airport

== Production ==
"The story is very fresh. We have tried our level best to make it as realistic as possible. It deals in different emotions that people experience when they're in love. It is believable because it also talks about the pain and suffering of heartbreak."

— Producer Goldie Behl

Fox Star Studios announced its association with Rose Movies for a new film titled London, Paris, New York at the launch event of movie on 24 August 2011. "Fox Star Studios has established a strong presence in the Indian Film industry in a very short time and have ably demonstrated their marketing and distribution capabilities – we are extremely excited to partner on our next project with people who are like minded and have the vision to take the film places," said Goldie Behl, producer, Rose Movies. "We are committed to working with the best talent in the business and are delighted to be working with Goldie and Shrishti on London, Paris, New York. It's an amazing script that we are all very excited about. With comedies driving audiences into the theatres, this romantic comedy is the film to watch out for in 2012," said Vijay Singh, CEO Fox Star Studios India.

Anu Menon makes her feature directing debut with this film. "We are happy to be working with Anu Menon who with her background of London Film School brings to the project the right balance of understanding emotional appeal in an international setting." says producer Shrishti Arya.

The title is simple and says a lot about the movie. When asked about its significance, Ali Zafar said, "The title is an integral part of the film. It provides a backdrop to the love story and helps in portraying the characters' journey of love".

=== Casting ===
Ali Zafar and Aditi Rao Hydari play the romantic leads in the film, and their involvement was announced in the same press release as the initial production company announcement. This is the first time they've been paired together. Aditi Rao Hydari who has landed the part in Ali Zafar starrer London, Paris, New York shares how she be wanted to cast me in some film. A week later Anu's script reached his desk, he read it and said "Aditi- the Airtel girl. Ali was always a part of the project, so it all fell into place magically like it was meant to be- that's why I believe in miracles!". "In our film we have a new cast of immensely talented actors – Ali Zafar (of Tere Bin Laden fame) and Aditi Rao, who we are sure will definitely appeal to the youth in this coming of age love story and thereby ably demonstrating our commitment to nurture fresh talent in the industry," added Mr. Singh.

=== Filming ===
"Last day of shoot for London, Paris, New York. Crew wraps up in NYC."

— Producer Goldie Behl

Shot in the three most popular and beautiful cities of the world, London, Paris and New York City. The filming started in early August 2011. While shooting at Heathrow airport in London, actors Ali Zafar and Aditi Rao found themselves in a peculiar situation. Both were shooting at the busy airport and as the crew members were setting up the shot, they decided to go for a quick rehearsal of their dialogues. That's when a couple of real-life fliers pitched in and tried to help them out. As film London, Paris, New York was caught in the crossfire for affecting locals, the filmmaker had to change the shooting location to a place outside London. The cast and crew got done with the London chapter and moved to Paris, the city of love, for its second schedule. After finishing the Paris schedule the team moved on to New York for their final last schedule.

== Release ==
The film released worldwide on 2 March 2012 following the premiere in U.A.E, US and India. Ali has been promoting the film extensively on Pakistan's Geo TV, which will be releasing the film there. Film producers planned a big, red carpet premiere in Karachi on 8 March and red carpet premiere at Vox Cinemas in Deira City Center, Dubai on 29 February. London Paris New York released on 1 March 2012 in U.A.E. The red carpet was attended by leading stars, film producers along with the debutante director and others.

=== Critical response ===
Professional ratings
Review scores
Source	Rating
Bollywood Hungama	3.5/5 stars
Times of India	3/5 stars

The film generally earned positive reviews from critics. Taran Adarsh of Bollywood Hungama awarded it 3.5 out of 5 stars and wrote, "On the whole, LONDON PARIS NEW YORK is the hackneyed and passe rom-coms. It's a quirky, witty, coming-of-age movie that takes a conventional premise and twirls it into something delightfully unconventional, designed to charm and magnetize the urban youth. The movie speaks their lingo, mirrors their objectives and depicts the anguish and elation of falling in love. If you are young or young at heart, celebrate your weekend by leaping onto this feel-good earth hopping romance." Aniruddha Guha of DNA India awarded the film 3/5 stars and stated, "LPNY is a short and sweet romcom that will leave you with a smile. Go for it. Rajeev Masand of IBN Live gave the movie 3 out of 5 stars, writing that "The charismatic actors rise above the flawed script to deliver an easy, enjoyable evening at the movies. Watch it for its freshness; you won't be bored."

== Soundtrack ==
Ali Zafar is the music director and lyricist of the movie. The film also marks Zafar's Bollywood debut as a composer after proving himself as a playback singer with films like Tere Bin Laden, Luv Ka The End and Mere Brother Ki Dulhan. In fact both the stars, Zafar and Aditi Rao Hydari, have sung well in the film. The soundtrack consists of 6 different tracks. LPNY music released on 30 January 2012 by Sony Music India.
