= Zarin Shihab =

Indian actress

- Born: 15 August 1994 (age 32); Uttar Pradesh, India
- Education: IIT Madras
- Occupation: Actress
- Years active: 2019–present
- Awards: Kerala Film Critics Association Award for Best Actress

Zarin Shihab (born 15 August 1994) is an Indian actress who works in Malayalam films. She is known for her debut role in the 2019 spy thriller series The Family Man, where she played a nurse crucial to the show's plot.

Born in Uttar Pradesh and a graduate from IIT Madras, Zarin made her entry into Malayalam cinema in the film Trishanku (2023) and has since acted in the films B 32 Muthal 44 Vare (2023) and Aattam (2024). She is a recipient of Kerala Film Critics Association Awards for Best Actress for Aattam.

== Early life and education ==
Zarin was born in Uttar Pradesh, India. Originally a native of Kerala, she has lived in Assam, Karnataka, and Tamil Nadu due to her father serving in the Indian Air Force. She graduated from IIT Madras after completing a five-year integrated Master of Arts in English, furthering her passion for language and literature. During her college days, Zarin was actively involved in theatre and participated in short films. She later spent seven years in Chennai, where she acted in, wrote, and directed plays.

== Career ==
Zarin Shihab debuted in the 2019 spy thriller series The Family Man. The series streamed on Amazon Prime and she gained significant acclaim for her portrayal of a Malayali nurse. In 2021, she appeared in the film Rashmi Rocket directed by Akarsh Khurana. In 2022, she acted in India Lockdown, directed by Madhur Bhandarkar. She was then cast in the TV series Jugaadistan.

In 2023, Zarin debuted in Malayalam cinema in Trishanku directed by Achyuth Vinayak, portraying the character Sumi Nair. In the same year, she starred in another Malayalam film B 32 Muthal 44 Vare directed by Shruthi Sharanyam which was produced by the Kerala State Film Development Corporation, where she played the role of Iman. In 2024, she played the female lead in the Malayalam film Aattam directed by Anand Ekarshi. She earned acclaim at film festivals for her performances in the Malayalam films B 32 Muthal 44 Vere and Aattam where she portrayed characters confronting workplace harassment.

== Filmography ==
=== Films ===
Key
†	Denotes films that have not yet been released

Year	Title	Role	Notes
2021	Rashmi Rocket	Anushri	Hindi film
2022	India Lockdown	Palak	Hindi film
2023	B 32 Muthal 44 Vare	Iman	
2023	Thrishanku	Sumi	
2024	Aattam	Anjali	
2025	Rekhachithram	Young Pushpam	
2025	Ouseppinte Osyath	Anjali	
2025	Ithiri Neram	Anjana S Kumar	
2026	Chatha Pacha	Jasmine	Cameo appearance
2026	Patriot	Ayisha Iqbal	
2026	Athiradi	Varada	

=== Television ===
Year	Title	Role	Language	Ref
2019	The Family Man	Nurse Sahaya Mary	Hindi	
2022	Jugaadistan	Devika	Hindi	
2025	The Chronicles of the 4.5 Gang	Pranitha	Malayalam	

== Accolades ==
Year	Award	Category	Work	Result	Ref.
2024	Kerala Film Critics Association Awards	Best Actress	Aattam	Won	
2026	Filmfare Awards South	Critics Best Actress – Malayalam	Aattam	Won	
