= Matchbox Shots =

Indian film and web series production company

Matchbox Shots LLP
- Type: Limited liability partnership
- Industry: Media and entertainment
- Founded: 30 January 2019; 7 years ago
- Founders: Sanjay Routray; Sarita Patil; Dikssha Jyote Routray
- Headquarters: Mumbai, Maharashtra, India
- Key people: Sanjay Routray; Sarita Patil; Dikssha Jyote Routray; Sriram Raghavan
- Products: Films; Web series Advertisements
- Website: matchboxshots.com

Matchbox Shots LLP is an Indian film and web series production company based in Mumbai, Maharashtra. It was founded by Sanjay Routray, with partners Sarita Patil and Dikssha Jyote Routray, and was incorporated on 30 January 2019.

The company's productions include the films Monica, O My Darling (2022), Three of Us (2023), Thrishanku (2023), Merry Christmas (2024) and All India Rank (2024), and the streaming series Scoop (2023), IC 814: The Kandahar Hijack (2024), Khauf (2025) and Operation Safed Sagar (2026).

== History ==
Matchbox Shots LLP was incorporated on 30 January 2019 by producer Sanjay Routray together with Sarita Patil and Dikssha Jyote Routray, with its headquarters in Mumbai. The company evolved from Routray's banner Matchbox Pictures, which produced Sriram Raghavan's black comedy thriller Andhadhun (2018), for which it won the National Film Award for Best Hindi Film. The founders have described Raghavan and screenwriter Jaideep Sahni as creative mentors to the company.

The company's early slate combined theatrical and streaming projects across languages, including Vasan Bala's comic thriller Monica, O My Darling (2022) for Netflix, Avinash Arun's drama Three of Us (2023), the Malayalam film Thrishanku (2023), and Varun Grover's directorial debut All India Rank, which premiered as the closing film at the International Film Festival Rotterdam in 2023.

In streaming, the company produced Hansal Mehta's Netflix series Scoop (2023), followed by Anubhav Sinha's IC 814: The Kandahar Hijack (2024), which debuted at number two on Netflix's global non-English charts, and the Amazon Prime Video horror series Khauf (2025), for which it won 7 Filmfare OTT Awards, the highest for any web series that year. Raghavan's Merry Christmas (2024) was also produced under the Matchbox banner.

In 2026, the company produced the Netflix war drama series Operation Safed Sagar, directed by Oni Sen and created by Abhijeet Singh Parmar and Kushal Srivastava, in association with Feel Good Films. Set during the Kargil War and depicting the Indian Air Force's operation of the same name, the series was reported to be mounted on a budget of over ₹200 crore and involved shooting at working air bases and high-altitude locations with a crew of more than 450 people. Following its release on 7 August 2026, the series reached number two worldwide among Netflix's non-English titles and number one in India.

As a companion to the series, the company produced the documentary film The Last Salute: A Love Letter to MiG-21 (2026), directed by Kushal Srivastava, which chronicles the MiG-21's six-decade service in the Indian Air Force and features Chief of the Air Staff A. P. Singh. It premiered on Netflix on 26 August 2026.

== Filmography ==
=== Films ===
Year	Title	Director	Language	Notes	Ref.
2018	Andhadhun	Sriram Raghavan	Hindi	Produced under the banner's earlier name, Matchbox Pictures; won three National Film Awards	
2022	Monica, O My Darling	Vasan Bala	Hindi	Released on Netflix	
2023	Three of Us	Avinash Arun	Hindi	Screened at the International Film Festival of India	
2023	Thrishanku	Achyuth Vinayak	Malayalam		
2024	Merry Christmas	Sriram Raghavan	Hindi, Tamil		
2024	All India Rank	Varun Grover	Hindi	Premiered at the International Film Festival Rotterdam	

=== Web series ===
Year	Title	Director	Platform	Notes	Ref.
2023	Scoop	Hansal Mehta	Netflix		
2024	IC 814: The Kandahar Hijack	Anubhav Sinha	Netflix	Debuted at No. 2 on Netflix's global non-English charts	
2025	Khauf	Pankaj Kumar, Surya Balakrishnan	Amazon Prime Video	Won 7 Filmfare OTT Awards	
2026	Operation Safed Sagar	Oni Sen	Netflix	Co-produced with Feel Good Films; reached No. 2 worldwide among non-English titles	
2026	The Last Salute: A Love Letter to MiG-21	Kushal Srivastava	Hindi	Documentary; released on Netflix	

== Upcoming projects ==
In August 2026, Variety reported that Sriram Raghavan was developing two projects for the company, including an untitled thriller in the tonal zone of his 2007 film Johnny Gaddaar and a true-crime adaptation. The company's slate was also reported to include a second season of Scoop with Hansal Mehta for Netflix and an untitled dark comedy thriller from Vasan Bala.
