= Aniruddha Guha =

Indian screenwriter

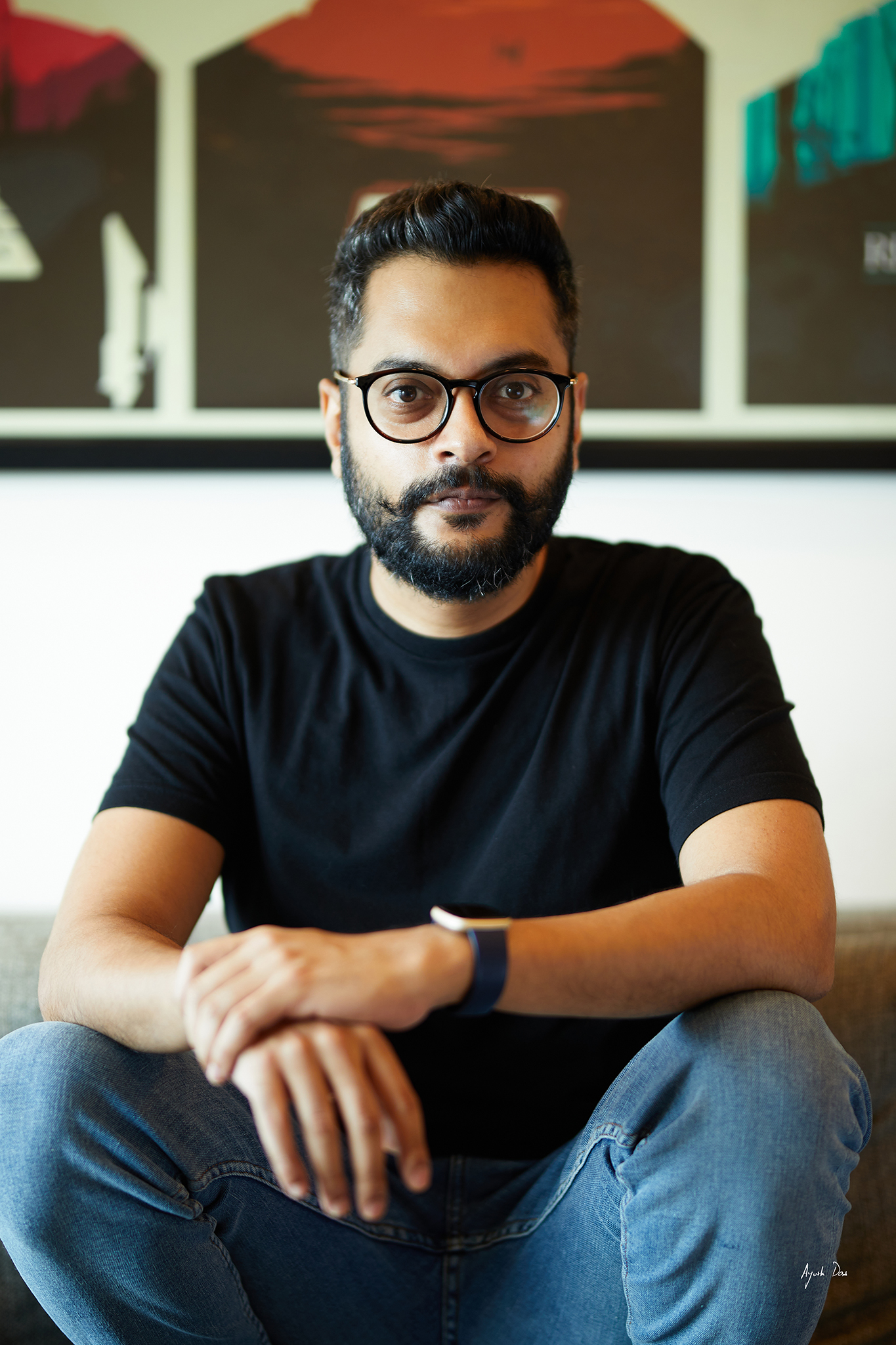
- Born: 13 November 1985 (age 40); Mumbai, India
- Occupations: Screenwriter, journalist
- Notable work: Shekhar Home; Ranneeti: Balakot & Beyond; Rashmi Rocket; Malang

Aniruddha Guha is an Indian screenwriter of Hindi films. He is also a former film critic who contributed to leading publications like DNA, The Hindu, Firstpost and Mumbai Mirror. In 2024, Guha created and wrote the series, Shekhar Home - an adaptation of the Sherlock Holmes stories written by Arthur Conan Doyle. Earlier the same year, he wrote the screenplay of the series, Ranneeti: Balakot & Beyond. His other screenwriting credits include P.O.W. - Bandi Yuddh Ke, Malang and Rashmi Rocket. At the 67th Filmfare Awards, Guha got a nomination in the category of Best Screenplay for the film Rashmi Rocket.

== Career ==
Guha started his career as a journalist in 2007 at the newspaper, DNA (Daily News & Analysis), where he reviewed films. Later, he joined Time Out (Mumbai) magazine as Editor, Film. In addition, Guha has written columns for publications like Mumbai Mirror, The Hindu, Firstpost, and MensXP.

In 2016, Guha made his debut as a screenwriter with the political thriller series P.O.W. - Bandi Yuddh Ke, an official adaptation of Gideon Raff’s Hatufim (earlier adapted as Homeland in the US). The critically-acclaimed series, directed by Nikkhil Advani, won Best Asian Show at the Seoul International Awards, and Best Drama (Jury) at the Indian Television Academy Awards. For his work on the show, Guha got nominated for Best Teleplay at the Indian Television Academy awards.

His next as screenwriter, the action thriller film Malang, released in 2020 and was a box office hit. Bollywood Hungama, in its 3.5 star review of Malang, said: “Aniruddha Guha's screenplay ensures most scenes don’t give a strong déjà vu of any film. There’s a lot happening in the film and the script is written in such a way that it does not bore the audience”. For IANS, critic Vinayak Chakravorty wrote that while the core idea may sound cliched, "Aniruddha Guha’s screenplay maintains suspense by opting for a parallel narrative structure". The same year, Guha worked as a story consultant on the show, Code M, a military procedural.

In 2021, he wrote the screenplay and additional dialogues of the sports drama film Rashmi Rocket, directed by Akarsh Khurana, released on the streaming platform, ZEE 5, on October 15. Ronak Kotecha of The Times of India gave Rashmi Rocket four stars and said, "Nanda Periyasamy’s riveting story, Aniruddha Guha’s sharp screenplay and Akarsh Khurana’s able direction, holds your attention right from the beginning until the end, where the race for justice is played out in a court." In her review for The Quint, film critic Stutee Ghosh gave the film 3.5 stars, and said, "Director Akarsh Khurana and screenplay writer Aniruddha Guha seem to have made a conscious choice to keep the tone upbeat and that works in favour of the film." In her review for Mashable, Sushri Saha wrote, "With strong performances led by Pannu and a well-written screenplay, the film does justice to the issues it raises and challenges."

In April 2024, Guha wrote the screenplay of the series, Ranneeti: Balakot & Beyond, which streams on Jio Cinema. In an interview with First Post, Guha said, “(Ranneeti) is more about what goes on behind-the-scenes during war time. The split-second decision-making, the diplomatic hustle, the collateral to be considered each time, the potential backlash from the international community - these made for very interesting plot points in the long-format space. And we explored these themes from both sides of the border.”

Guha created and wrote Shekhar Home, the official Indian adaptation of the original Sherlock Holmes cannon of stories, written by Arthur Conan Doyle. The series launched on Jio Cinema on August 14.

== Personal life ==
He is the grandson of noted filmmaker Dulal Guha.

== Filmography ==
Year	Movie/web	worked as	Notes
2024	Shekhar Home	Creator, Story & Screenplay	
2024	Ranneeti: Balakot & Beyond	Screenplay	
2021	Rashmi Rocket	Screenplay & additional dialogues	
2020	Malang	Screenplay	
2016	P.O.W. - Bandi Yuddh Ke	Story & screenplay	
