= Sandeep Aur Pinky Faraar =

2021 Indian film by Dibakar Banerjee

- Theatrical release poster
- Directed by: Dibakar Banerjee
- Written by: Dibakar Banerjee; Varun Grover
- Produced by: Dibakar Banerjee
- Starring: Parineeti Chopra; Arjun Kapoor
- Cinematography: Anil Mehta
- Edited by: Bakul Baljeet Matiyani; Paramita Ghosh
- Music by: Score: Dibakar Banerjee; Songs: Anu Malik; Dibakar Banerjee; Narendra Chandra; Kamlesh Haripuri
- Production company: DBP
- Distributed by: Yash Raj Films
- Release date: 19 March 2021
- Running time: 126 minutes
- Country: India
- Language: Hindi
- Budget: ₹20 crore
- Box office: ₹58.125 lakh

Sandeep Aur Pinky Faraar (transl. Sandeep And Pinky Have Absconded) is a 2021 Indian Hindi-language black comedy drama film directed and produced by Dibakar Banerjee with distribution by Yash Raj Films. The film stars Parineeti Chopra and Arjun Kapoor as the titular characters. Filming began on 7 November 2017 in Mahipalpur. Initially scheduled for theatrical release on 20 March 2020, the film was postponed due to COVID-19 pandemic in India. After being delayed for a year, it was finally released theatrically on 19 March 2021.

Made on the budget of ₹20 crores, the film grossed ₹58.125 lakhs globally, emerging as a box office bomb. The critical reception was mixed-to-positive with praise towards the storyline, performances (particularly Chopra), Banerjee's direction and social commentary but criticism towards its slow pacing.

At the 67th Filmfare Awards, Sandeep Aur Pinky Faraar received 10 nominations, including Best Film (Critics), Best Actress (Chopra) and Best Supporting Actress (Neena Gupta), and won Best Dialogue (Grover and Banerjee).

== Plot ==
The film opens with a group of friends in their SUV returning home from a party when suddenly, they are killed by a hail of bullets. Several hours earlier, Sandeep Kaur Walia a.k.a. Sandy, a top executive at Parivartan Bank, is waiting for her boss, Parichay, for a dinner date at an upscale restaurant. She meets a journalist, Purva, who invites her to a party later in the evening. Outside, Sandy meets Satinder Dahiya alias "Pinky", who informs her that he is a cop with Haryana police and Parichay has sent a car to take her to somewhere else to meet. Sandy is annoyed by Pinky's driving, especially since he is continuously on the phone with his boss (informing him of their location), and reveals that she is three months pregnant. Pinky encounters hooting from the young men in a nearby SUV and when his boss asks for his car's license plate number, he gives the number of the SUV.

The SUV is stopped at a police check post where they fire indiscriminately at it, as shown in the opening scene. Pinky, who is driving behind the SUV, witnesses the massacre and drives to an isolated place. He concludes that Sandy was the actual target and the police wanted to kill him as well to frame her death as a casualty in a failed operation on a suspended police officer. Pinky calls up his boss Tyagi, the head of a private security firm, who tries to placate him. He demands answers from Sandy but she remains evasive.

Sandy takes Pinky to the party Purva invited her to in order to relax and get a sense of the situation, where she finds that her SM accounts are blocked. The police track her and the duo flees the party. Pinky tries strangling Sandy to protect himself but cannot go through with it. He plans to go to Nepal and Sandy asks Pinky to take her with him, promising a million rupees in exchange. They travel by train and then bus to Pithoragarh, a border town. Upset by the unsanitary conditions around her, Sandy requests a friendly couple, Aunty and Uncle, in the market to take them as paying guests. Pinky finds an agent who will create fake documents for them to cross over to Nepal.

Uncle reveals that he has invested 4 lakh in the 'Swabhiman' scheme of Parivartan Bank. Sandy is alarmed and helps him to withdraw his money from the scheme. She reveals to Pinky that the Swabhiman scheme was her brainchild: a fraudulent scheme designed to quickly gain a vast number of depositors to save her sinking bank. During this time, she had an affair with her boss and became pregnant. Sandy wanted to resign after taking her share of 32 crores for the sake of her child, which Parichay refused and is the reason he wants to kill her. She gets Uncle a refund from the scheme at the bank by offering its manager a chance to embezzle a few million rupees using her intimate knowledge of their operations.

Later that night, when the funds are transferred, Parichay's team in Delhi is alerted to Sandy's location. The bank manager recognises Sandy and tries to rape her but she fights him off and consequently suffers a miscarriage. Pinky tends to Sandy's injuries and cremates her foetus. Sandy cannot bear this loss and goes into shock. Pinky tries to help her recover and they grow closer. After learning the truth about Sandy, Uncle and Aunty feel betrayed and refuse the refund she gave them.

Tyagi traces Pinky and Sandy to a wedding procession, which they plan to use as a disguise to cross the border. Pinky learns of this and calls Tyagi, asking him to let Sandy pass in return for the 1 million he had earlier received from her and his surrender, but his boss refuses. Sandy decides to settle some scores and convinces Pinky to leave without her. She returns to the city while Pinky cross-dresses and escapes the police check post. Knowing that she will be murdered if Tyagi's team gets hold of her, Sandy instead surrenders herself to the local police.

In the epilogue, Sandy has exposed the scam of Parivartan Bank. Purva visits her in jail and tells her about Parichay's arrest, with six cases of fraud filed against him. Purva points out that Sandy could have received a lighter sentence and more sympathy if she disclosed her miscarriage but Sandy refuses. Purva then gives Sandy a package from P. Thapa addressed to her, posted from Nepal. It contains only a few photos of kids dancing in a Bollywood dance school in Nepal. Sandy understands it's from Pinky and smiles.

== Cast ==
- Parineeti Chopra as Sandeep "Sandy" Kaur Walia
- Arjun Kapoor as Satinder "Pinky" Dahiya
- Jaideep Ahlawat as Tyagi
- Raghubir Yadav as Uncle
- Neena Gupta as Aunty
- Dinker Sharma as Parichay
- Daljeet Singh as Bose
- Jaipreet Singh as Garry Ji
- Rahul Kumar as Munna
- Dev Chauhan as Nihal
- Abhishek Yadav as Harshad
- Suruchi Aulakh as Purva

== Production ==
Yash Raj Films announced the film on 3 July 2017. It marks the third collaboration between Kapoor and Chopra after they starred together in Ishaqzaade (2012), which was followed by the two pairing up again in Namaste England (2018).

On 30 October 2017, Kapoor shared an image of his character which is shown to be a cop. On 27 March 2018, the second look of both actors was released, giving a glimpse of their different worlds.

Filming took place in locations near (Pithoragarh) the Indo-Nepal border of Uttarakhand. To get into their characters, Banerjee insisted the two not to communicate with each other prior to filming and even off-screen. Filming of Arjun's portion wrapped up on 17 January 2018.

== Soundtrack ==
Sandeep Aur Pinky Faraar

Soundtrack album by Anu Malik, Dibakar Banerjee, Narendra Chandra and Kamlesh Haripuri
- Released: 9 March 2021
- Recorded: 2019–20
- Genre: Feature Film Soundtrack
- Length: 14:33
- Language: Hindi
- Label: YRF Music
- Producer: Dibakar Banerjee

Official audio
- Sandeep Aur Pinky Faraar – Full Album on YouTube

The film's soundtrack is composed by Anu Malik, Dibakar Banerjee, Narendra Chandra and Kamlesh Haripuri, with lyrics written by Anu Malik, Dibakar Banerjee, Pardhaan, Narendra Chandra, Sangeeta Chandra and Kamlesh Haripuri. The film's background score is composed by Dibakar Banerjee.

Track listing
No.	Title	Lyrics	Music	Singer(s)	Length
1.	"Faraar"	Anu Malik, Dibakar Banerjee	Anu Malik	Anu Malik	5:42
2.	"Don"	Pardhaan, Narendra Chandra	Narendra Chandra	Pardhaan, Narendra Chandra	2:46
3.	"iPhone"	Narendra Chandra, Sangeeta Chandra	Narendra Chandra	Sohaan Khan	3:27
4.	"Maata Dharti Par Aaja"	Dibakar Banerjee, Kamlesh Haripuri	Dibakar Banerjee, Kamlesh Haripuri	Kamlesh Haripuri	1:42
5.	"Maa Ka Bulaava Aayega"	Kamlesh Haripuri	Dibakar Banerjee, Kamlesh Haripuri	Mangesh Shirke	0:56
Total length:					14:33

== Release ==
Initially scheduled for release on 20 March 2020, the film release was postponed due to the COVID-19 pandemic. The producers announced in May 2020 that the film's release had been postponed until theatres reopen. The film was released in theatres on 19 March 2021.

== Reception ==
=== Critical response ===
Upon release, the film received mixed reviews from the film critics who generally praised the performances of the lead actors, particularly of Chopra's but criticised the film for its slow pacing.

On the review aggregator website Rotten Tomatoes, 55% of 11 critics' reviews are positive, with an average rating of 5.9/10.

Saibal Chatterjee of NDTV awarded the film 3.5 stars (out of 5) and wrote, "Sandeep Aur Pinky Faraar is an inspired cinematic essay that draws strength from upending time-worn tics". Shubhra Gupta of The Indian Express gave the film 3 stars (out of 5) and wrote, "Dibakar Banerji, who has a nuanced eye when it comes to depicting power play and class differences in the NCR, should have given us a tighter film". Sukanya Verma of Rediff gave the film 3 stars (out of 5) and stated, "Sandeep Aur Pinky Faraar is an intriguing mess". Stutee Ghosh of The Quint gave the film a score of 3 (out of 5) and wrote, "Devoid of excesses and dramatic highs, the sparseness with which Banerjee steers the story adds meaning and subtly. While mainstream Bollywood fares spell out every little detail and even hammer it repeatedly, Sandeep Aur Pinky Faraar fervently sticks to its austerity". Anupama Chopra of Film Companion wrote, "Sandeep Aur Pinky Faraar doesn't have the pacing that you might expect in a chase film. The narrative has long stretches that plod dangerously. But ultimately, Dibakar steers it to a climax that is both stinging and satisfying".

Anna M. M. Vetticad of Firstpost gave the film 2.75 stars (out of 5) and wrote, "The film is a mixed bag but I found myself drawn to its quietude and to its heartening conviction that kindness may be found in the most unexpected places and the most unexpected persons could turn out to be allies, sometimes without the expectation of anything in return". Ronak Kotecha of Times of India gave 2.5 stars (out of 5) and wrote, "Sandeep Aur Pinky Faraar is one of those neo-noir films that set out with a promise to engage, entertain and educate by slowly unraveling its layered subtext. But with its preposterous execution and frustratingly slow pace, it's the audience who might want to escape, much before Sandeep and Pinky". Film critic based at Bollywood Hungama gave the film 2 stars (out of 5) and wrote, "Sandeep Aur Pinky Faraar has a bearable first half but goes terribly downhill in the second hour". However, they praised Chopra and Kapoor by stating that they delivered a "convincing" and "restrained" respectively. Tanul Thakur of The Wire (India) called the film "a joyless, drab watch" and stated that its Banerjee's most "underwhelming" movie. He wrote, "The most obvious culprits are the lead actors who struggle to bring any kind of magnetism or chemistry to their roles".

=== Box office ===
The film was released in 375 screens on 19 March 2021. The film earned ₹6 lakh on its opening day and the opening weekend collection was ₹20 lakh.

In its complete theatrical run the film grossed ₹40 lakh in India and ₹18.125 lakh overseas, for a worldwide gross collection of ₹58.125 lakhs.

== Accolades ==
Year	Award	Category	Nominee(s)	Result	Ref.
2022	67th Filmfare Awards	Best Film (Critics)	Dibakar Banerjee	Nominated	
2022	67th Filmfare Awards	Best Actress	Parineeti Chopra	Nominated	
2022	67th Filmfare Awards	Best Supporting Actress	Neena Gupta	Nominated	
2022	67th Filmfare Awards	Best Story	Dibakar Banerjee, Varun Grover	Nominated	
2022	67th Filmfare Awards	Best Screenplay	Dibakar Banerjee, Varun Grover	Nominated	
2022	67th Filmfare Awards	Best Dialogue	Dibakar Banerjee, Varun Grover	Won	
2022	67th Filmfare Awards	Best Cinematography	Anil Mehta	Nominated	
2022	67th Filmfare Awards	Best Costume Design	Rohit Chaturvedi	Nominated	
2022	67th Filmfare Awards	Best Editing	Bakul Baljeet Matiyani	Nominated	
2022	67th Filmfare Awards	Best Production Design	Aparna Sud, Garima Mathur	Nominated	
2022	28th Lions Gold Awards	Powerhouse Performer of The Year	Parineeti Chopra	Won	

== Home media ==
On 20 May 2021, the movie began streaming on Amazon Prime Video and was positively received.
