= Shekhar Home =

Indian TV series

- Promotional release poster
- Genre: Crime; Drama
- Created by: Aniruddha Guha; Srijit Mukherji
- Inspired by: Sherlock Holmes by Arthur Conan Doyle
- Screenplay by: Aniruddha Guha; Niharika Puri; Vaibhav Vishal (dialogues)
- Story by: Aniruddha Guha
- Directed by: Rohan Sippy; Srijit Mukherji
- Starring: Kay Kay Menon; Ranvir Shorey; Rasika Dugal; Kirti Kulhari; Rudranil Ghosh; Kaushik Sen
- Country of origin: India
- Original language: Hindi
- No. of episodes: 6

Production
- Cinematography: Shanu Singh Rajput
- Running time: 39-47 mins
- Production company: BBC Studios Productions

Original release
- Network: JioCinema
- Release: 14 August 2024

Shekhar Home is an Indian Hindi-language crime drama television series created by Aniruddha Guha and Srijit Mukherji and directed by Rohan Sippy and Mukherji. An adaptation of Arthur Conan Doyle’s canon of Sherlock Holmes stories, the series is produced by BBC Studios Productions, and stars Kay Kay Menon, Ranvir Shorey, Rasika Dugal, Kirti Kulhari and Dibyendu Bhattacharya. The dialogues of the show are written by Vaibhav Vishal. The series premiered on JioCinema on 14 August 2024.

== Cast ==
- Kay Kay Menon as Shekhar Home, a genius detective (character based on Sherlock Holmes)
- Ranvir Shorey as Jayavrat Saini, a retired army medic and doctor (character loosely based on Dr. John Watson
- Rasika Dugal as Iraboty Adhyo (character based on Irene Adler)
- Kirti Kulhari as Mumtaz Afsari (character based on Colonel Sebastian Moran)
- Rudranil Ghosh as Inspector Gobindo Laha (character based on Inspector Gareth Lestrade)
- Dibyendu Bhattacharya as Debnath "Debu" Chaudhary
- Shernaz Patel as Mrs "H/Henry" Henriques (character based on Miss Hudson)
- Kaushik Sen as Mrinmoy (character based on Mycroft Holmes)
- Mir Afsar Ali as Das

== Production ==
The series was announced by BBC Studios Productions. The principal photography of the series commenced in April 2023. The filming was wrapped up in May 2023.

== Reception ==
The Times of India critic gave the series 3.5 stars, saying, “ ‘Shekhar Home,’ created by Aniruddha Guha and Sriijit Mukherji, and directed by Mukherji and Rohan Sippy, is a compelling series inspired by Arthur Conan Doyle's ‘Sherlock Holmes’. The creators have excelled in crafting a world that captivates from the very first frame.”

In another 3.5 star-rated review, the India Today critic Trisha Bhattacharya said, “The screenplay is tight, with well-researched cases and dialogues that stay true to the spirit of Doyle's stories. The Bengali representation is top-notch.”

In her review for Scroll, critic Nandini Ramnath said, “Breezy and irreverent, Shekhar Home's attitude is best captured by its high-performing hero's high-pitched giggle whenever a breakthrough occurs. Menon's detective is brilliant without being overbearing, a genial class topper rather than an insufferable genius.”

The Livemint review called Shekhar Home a deft Conan Doyle adaptation. “The adaptation of Doyle's stories (originally written in the late 1800s) by Srijit Mukherji and Aniruddha Guha skillfully integrates classic detective elements into an Indian context.”

The Free Press Journal rated the series 3.5 stars, and said: “This is a well-crafted series that offers a nostalgic ride through the labyrinthine mysteries of 1990s.”

Shubhra Gupta of The Indian Express gave the series 2/5 stars. Deepa Gahlot of Rediff.com rated the series 3/5 stars.

== See also ==
- Byomkesh Bakshi
