= 67th Filmfare Awards =

2022 awards for Hindi cinema

- 67th Filmfare Awards
- Presented on: 30 August 2022
- Site: Jio World Centre, Mumbai
- Hosted by: Ranveer Singh, Arjun Kapoor; Akshay Kumar
- Organized by: The Times Group
- Official website: Filmfare Awards 2022

Highlights
- Best Film: Shershaah
- Critics Award for Best Film: Sardar Udham
- Most awards: Sardar Udham (9)
- Most nominations: Shershaah (19)

Television coverage
- Network: Colors TV

The 67th Filmfare Awards ceremony, presented by The Times Group, honored the best Indian Hindi-language films that were released in 2021.

Shershaah led the ceremony with 19 nominations, followed by Sardar Udham and 83 with 14 nominations each, Rashmi Rocket with 11 nominations and Sandeep Aur Pinky Faraar with 10 nominations.

Sardar Udham won 9 awards, including Best Film (Critics) and Best Actor (Critics) (for Vicky Kaushal), thus becoming the most-awarded film at the ceremony.

Shershaah and Mimi won multiple awards at the ceremony, with the former winning Best Film and Best Director (for Vishnuvardhan), and the latter winning Best Actress (for Kriti Sanon), Best Supporting Actor (for Pankaj Tripathi) and Best Supporting Actress (for Sai Tamhankar).

For a second consecutive year, Pankaj Tripathi received dual nominations for Best Supporting Actor for his performances in 83 and Mimi, winning the award for the latter.

== Ceremony ==
Held at Jio World Centre, the 67th Filmfare Awards honored the films released in 2021. At a press conference helmed by editor of Filmfare magazine, Jitesh Pillai revealed Wolf777news as the title sponsor. Actors Ranveer Singh and Arjun Kapoor were announced as the co-hosts, while actors Nora Fatehi, Vicky Kaushal, Kartik Aaryan, Disha Patani, Janhvi Kapoor, Varun Dhawan and Kiara Advani were announced to be performing during the event. The ceremony took place on August 30, 2022, and was broadcast on September 9, 2022 on Colors TV.

== Winners and nominees ==
The nominations were announced by Filmfare on 18 August 2022 and the winners were announced on 30 August 2022.

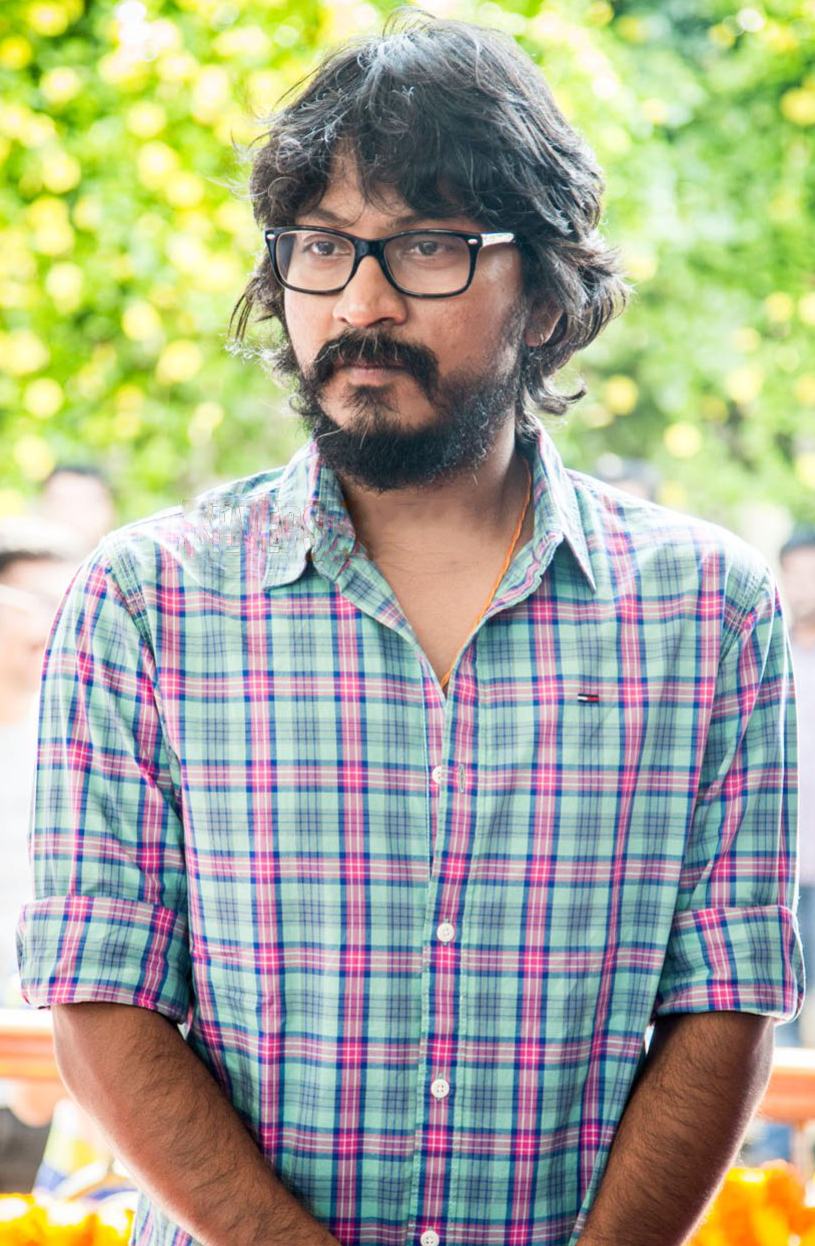
Vishnuvardhan, Best Director

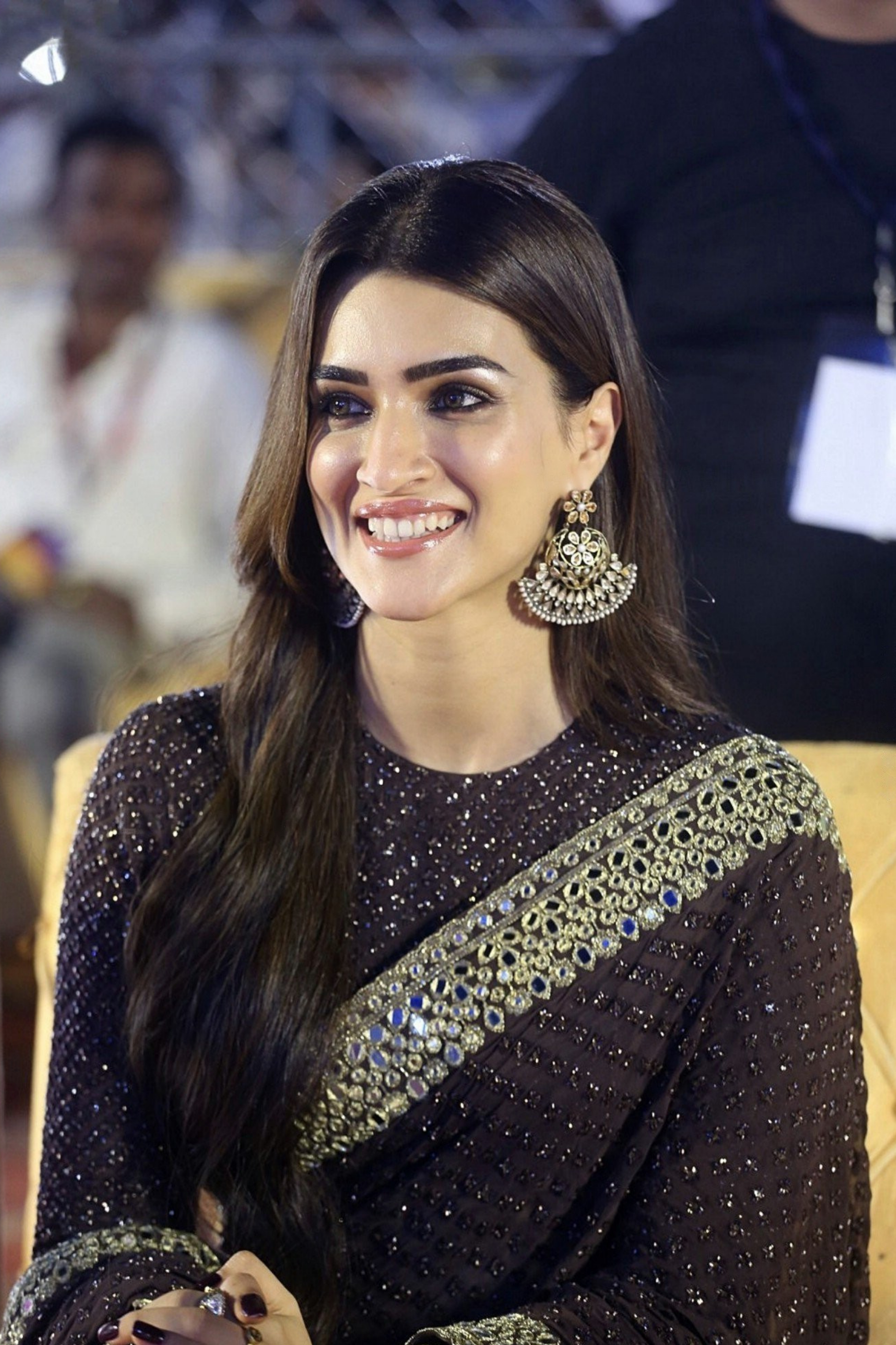
Kriti Sanon, Best Actress

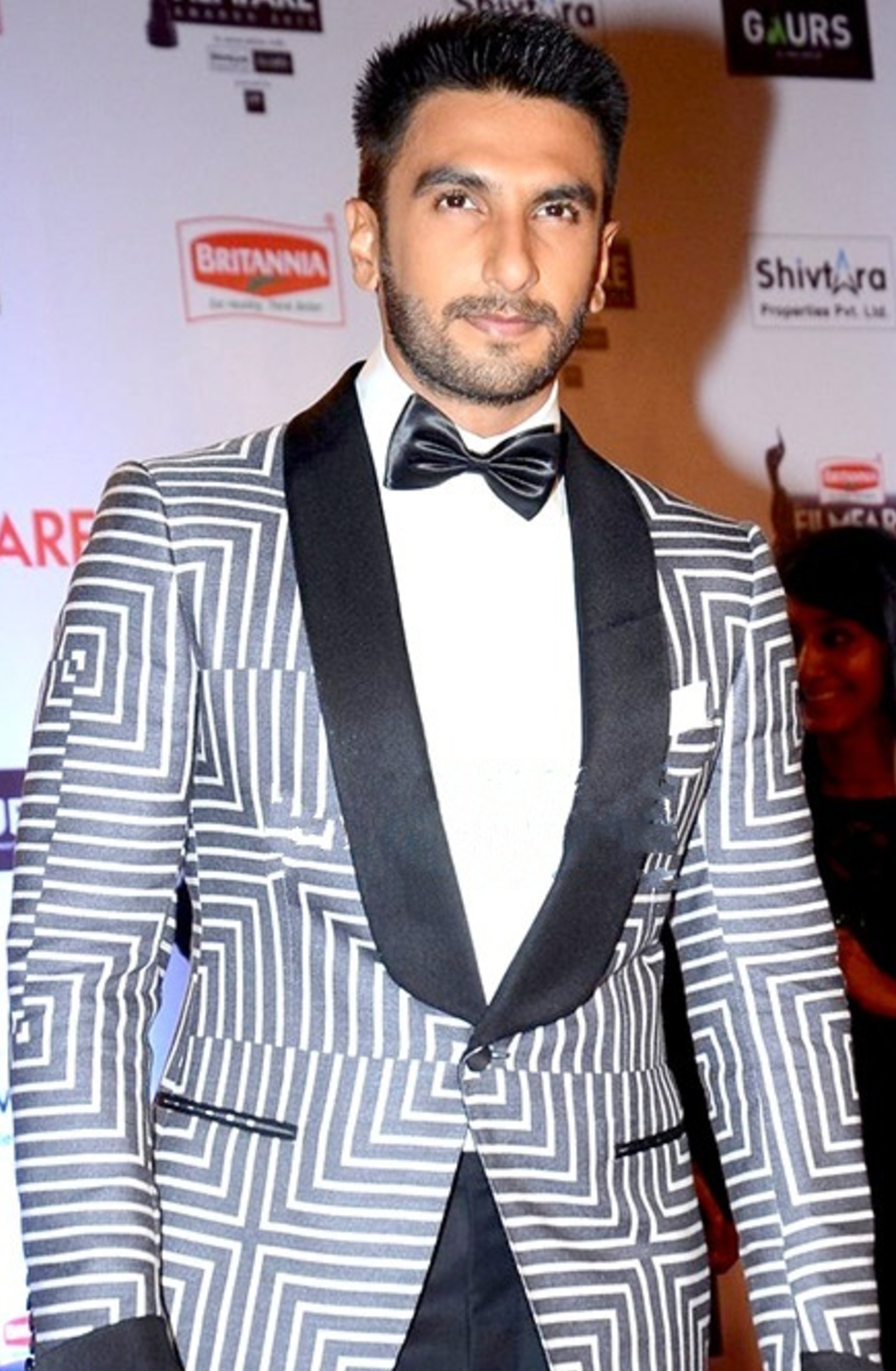
Ranveer Singh, Best Actor

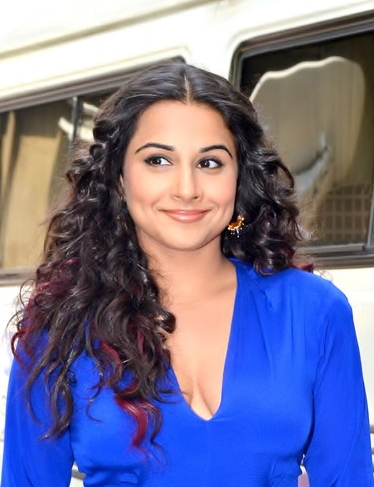
Vidya Balan, Best Actress Critics

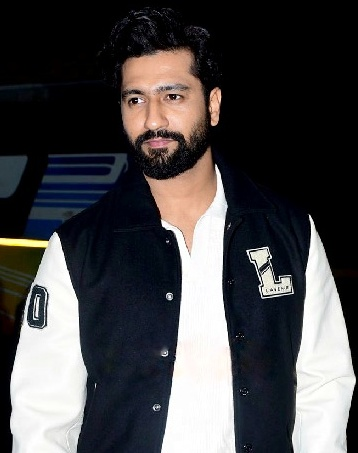
Vicky Kaushal, Best Actor Critics

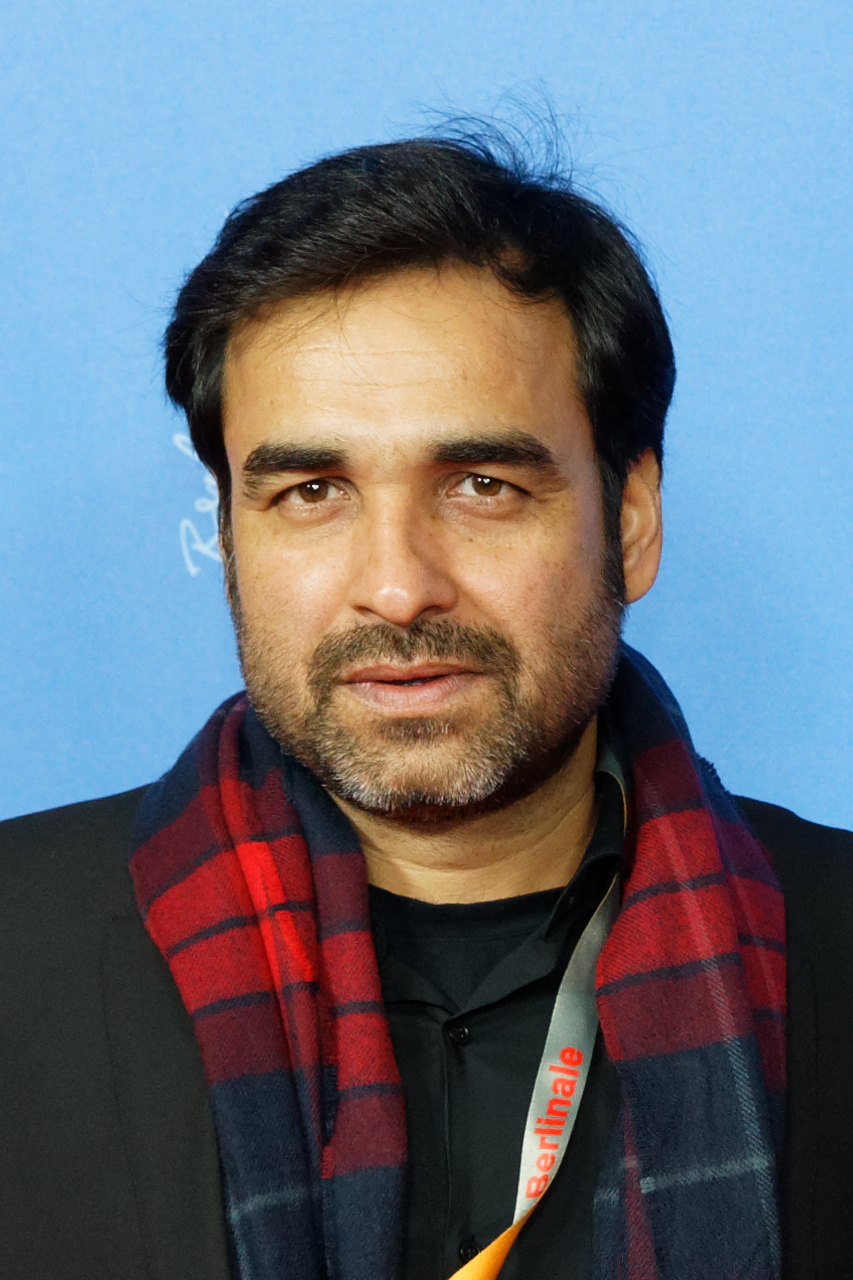
Pankaj Tripathi, Best Supporting Actor

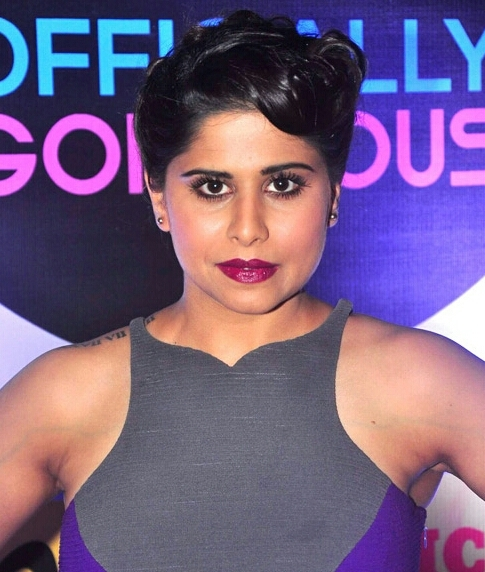
Sai Tamhankar, Best Supporting Actress

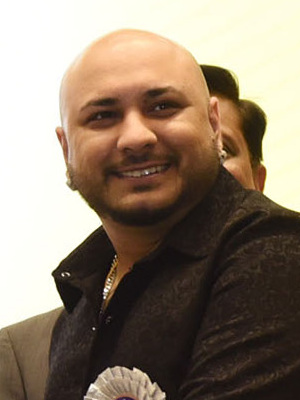
B Praak, Best Male Playback Singer

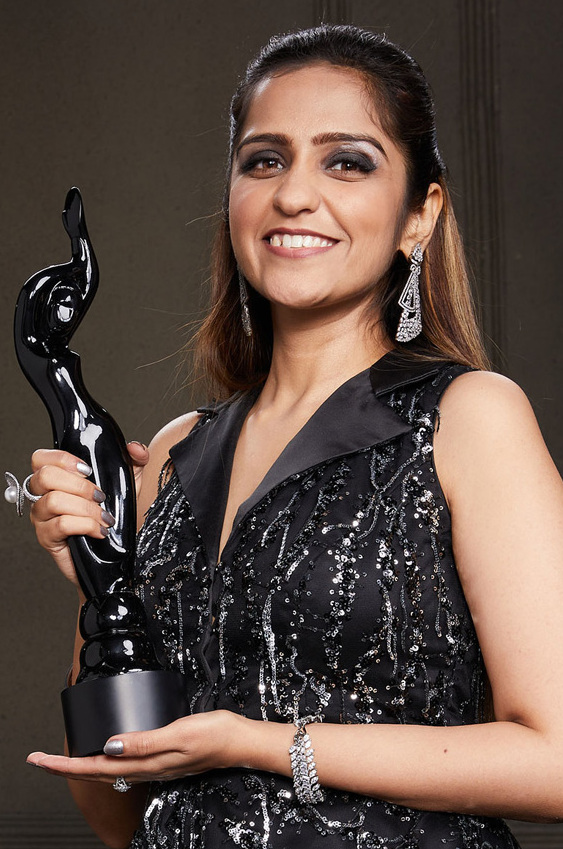
Asees Kaur, Best Female Playback Singer

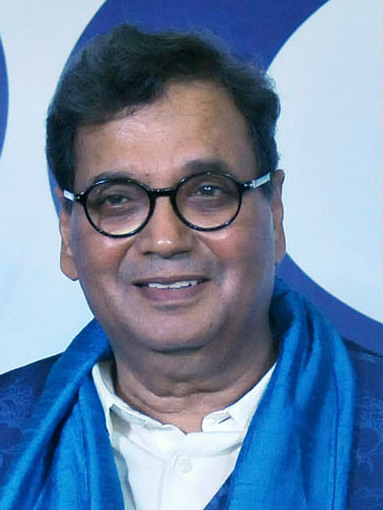
Subhash Ghai, Lifetime Achievement Awardee

=== Popular awards ===
Best Film		Best Director
Shershaah – Dharma Productions, Kaash Entertainment, Amazon Prime Video; Ramprasad Ki Tehrvi – Drishyam Films, Jio Studios; Rashmi Rocket – RSVP Movies, Mango People Media Network, ZEE5; Sardar Udham – Rising Sun Films, Kino Works, Amazon Prime Video		Vishnuvardhan – Shershaah; Akarsh Khurana – Rashmi Rocket; Kabir Khan – 83; Seema Pahwa – Ramprasad Ki Tehrvi; Shoojit Sircar – Sardar Udham
Best Actor		Best Actress
Ranveer Singh – 83 as Kapil Dev; Dhanush – Atrangi Re as S. Venkatesh Vishwanath 'Vishu' Iyer; Sidharth Malhotra – Shershaah as Captain Vikram Batra; Vicky Kaushal – Sardar Udham as Udham Singh		Kriti Sanon – Mimi as Mimi Rathore; Kiara Advani – Shershaah as Dimple Cheema; Parineeti Chopra – Sandeep Aur Pinky Faraar as Sandeep Kaur; Taapsee Pannu – Rashmi Rocket as Rashmi Chibbar; Vidya Balan – Sherni as Vidya Vincent
Best Supporting Actor		Best Supporting Actress
Pankaj Tripathi – Mimi as Bhanu Pratap Pandey; Abhishek Banerjee – Rashmi Rocket as Eeshit Mehta; Manav Kaul – Saina as Coach Sarvadhamaan Rajan; Pankaj Tripathi – 83 as PR Man Singh; Paran Bandopadhyay – Bob Biswas as Kali Krishna Paul; Raj Arjun – Thalaivii as R. N. Veerappan		Sai Tamhankar – Mimi as Shama Anand; Kirti Kulhari – The Girl on the Train as Inspector Dalbir Kaur Bagga; Konkona Sen Sharma – Ramprasad Ki Tehrvi as Seema; Meghna Malik – Saina as Usha Rani Nehwal; Neena Gupta – Sandeep Aur Pinky Faraar as Aunty "Meenu" Singh
Debut Awards
Best Male Debut	Best Female Debut	Best Debut Director
Ehan Bhat – 99 Songs as Jay	Sharvari – Bunty Aur Babli 2 as Sonia Rawat / Jasmine "Jazz"	Seema Pahwa – Ramprasad Ki Tehrvi
Writing Awards
Best Story	Best Screenplay	Best Dialogue
Abhishek Kapoor, Supratik Sen and Tushar Paranjape – Chandigarh Kare Aashiqui; Dibakar Banerjee and Varun Grover – Sandeep Aur Pinky Faraar; Kanika Dhillon – Haseen Dilruba; Nandha Periyasamy – Rashmi Rocket; Seema Pahwa – Ramprasad Ki Tehrvi	Shubendu Bhattacharya and Ritesh Shah – Sardar Udham; Aastha Tiku – Sherni; Aniruddha Guha – Rashmi Rocket; Dibakar Banerjee and Varun Grover – Sandeep Aur Pinky Faraar; Kabir Khan, Sanjay Puran Singh Chauhan and Vasan Bala – 83; Sandeep Shrivastava – Shershaah	Dibakar Banerjee and Varun Grover – Sandeep Aur Pinky Faraar; Amit V. Masurkar, Yashasvi Mishra – Sherni; Kabir Khan and Sumit Arora – 83; Kanika Dhillon – Rashmi Rocket; Ritesh Shah – Sardar Udham; Sandeep Shrivastava – Shershaah
Music Awards
Best Music Director		Best Lyricist
Tanishk Bagchi, B Praak, Jaani, Jasleen Royal, Javed-Mohsin And Vikram Montrose – Shershaah; A. R. Rahman – Atrangi Re; A. R. Rahman – Mimi; Amaal Malik – Saina; Amit Trivedi – Haseen Dilruba; Sachin–Jigar – Chandigarh Kare Aashiqui		Kausar Munir – "Lehra Do" – 83; Irshad Kamil – "Rait Zara Si" – Atrangi Re; Jaani – "Mann Bharrya 2.0" – Shershaah; Manoj Muntashir – "Parinda" – Saina; Tanishk Bagchi – "Raataan Lambiyaan" – Shershaah
Best Playback Singer – Male		Best Playback Singer – Female
B Praak – "Mann Bharrya" – Shershaah; Arijit Singh – "Lehra Do" – 83; Arijit Singh – "Rait Zara Si" – Atrangi Re; Devendrapal Singh – "Lakeeran" – Haseen Dilruba; Jubin Nautiyal – "Raataan Lambiyaan" – Shershaah		Asees Kaur – "Raataan Lambiyaan" – Shershaah; Asees Kaur – "Lakeeran" – Haseen Dilruba; Neha Kakkar – "Matlabi Yariyan" – The Girl on the Train; Priya Saraiya – "Kalle Kalle" – Chandigarh Kare Aashiqui; Shreya Ghoshal – "Chaka Chak" – Atrangi Re; Shreya Ghoshal – "Param Sundari" – Mimi

=== Critics' awards ===
Best Film
Shoojit Sircar – Sardar Udham; Amit V. Masurkar – Sherni; Dibakar Banerjee – Sandeep Aur Pinky Faraar; Seema Pahwa – Ramprasad Ki Tehrvi
Best Actor	Best Actress
Vicky Kaushal – Sardar Udham as Udham Singh; Abhishek Bachchan – Bob Biswas as Bob Biswas; Pratik Gandhi – Bhavai as Raja Ram Joshi; Ranveer Singh – 83 as Kapil Dev; Vikrant Massey – Haseen Dilruba as Rishabh Saxena	Vidya Balan – Sherni as Vidya Vincent; Supriya Pathak – Ramprasad Ki Tehrvi as Amma; Taapsee Pannu – Haseen Dilruba as Rani Kashyap

=== Special awards ===
Filmfare Special Award
- Not awarded
Filmfare Lifetime Achievement Award
- Subhash Ghai
Filmfare R. D. Burman Award
- Not awarded

=== Technical awards ===
Nominations for the Technical awards were announced on 30 July 2022.

Best Editing	Best Production Design	Best Choreography
A. Sreekar Prasad – Shershaah; Ajay Sharma, Shweta Venkat Mathew – Rashmi Rocket; Bakul Baljeet Matiyani – Sandeep Aur Pinky Faraar; Chandrashekhar Prajapati – Sardar Udham; Dipika Kalra – Sherni; Nitin Baid – 83	Mansi Dhruv Mehta and Dmitrii Malich – Sardar Udham; Acropolis, Rajnish Hedao and Paul Rowan – 83; Amit Ray and Subrata Chakraborty – Shershaah; Aparna Sud and Garima Mathur – Sandeep Aur Pinky Faraar; Devika Dave – Sherni; Durga Prasad Mahapatra – Rashmi Rocket	Vijay Ganguly – "Chaka Chak" – Atrangi Re; Farah Khan – "Tip Tip" – Sooryavanshi; Ganesh Acharya – "Param Sundari" – Mimi; Piyush–Shazia – "Nadiyon Paar" – Roohi; Vijay Ganguly – "Little Little" – Atrangi Re
Best Cinematography	Best Sound Design	Best Background Score
Avik Mukhopadhyay – Sardar Udham; Anil Mehta – Sandeep Aur Pinky Faraar; Aseem Mishra – 83; Kamaljeet Negi – Shershaah; Neha Parti Matiyani – Rashmi Rocket; Rakesh Haridas – Sherni	Dipankar Chaki, Nihar Ranjan Samal – Sardar Udham; Anish John – Sherni; Ganesh Gangadharan – 83; Sanjay Maurya, Allwin Rego – Chandigarh Kare Aashiqui	Shantanu Moitra – Sardar Udham; A. R. Rahman – 99 Songs; Amar Mangrulkar – Haseen Dilruba; Clinton Cerejo, Bianca Gomes, Shor Police – Bob Biswas; John Stewart Eduri – Shershaah; Julius Packiam – 83
Best Costume Design	Best Action	Best Special Effects
Veera Kapur EE – Sardar Udham; Eka Lakhani – Shershaah; Neeta Lulla, Deepali Noor – Thalaivii; Rohit Chaturvedi – Rashmi Rocket; Rohit Chaturvedi – Sandeep Aur Pinky Faraar	Stefan Richter, Sunil Rodrigues – Shershaah; Allan Amin – Toofaan; Rob Miller, Amar Shetty – 83; Sunil Rodrigues – Sooryavanshi; Vikram Dahiya – Antim: The Final Truth	VFXwaala, Edit FX Studios – Sardar Udham; NY VFXwaala – Sooryavanshi; Red Chillies VFX – Shershaah; ReDefine – 83; Unifi Media – Thalaivii

=== Short film awards ===
Best Short Film
Fiction	Non-fiction	People's Choice
Sorry Bhaisaab	Varsa	Masterji
Best Actor – Male (Short Film)		Best Actor – Female (Short Film)
Kumud Mishra - Itwaar		Sampa Mandal - Sapna

== Controversy ==
Kangana Ranaut shared a message through her Instagram story stating that the Filmfare Awards were corrupt and accused them of handing out the awards just for attending the ceremony, and thus decided to sue them. Initially, she was nominated for Best Actress for her performance in the film Thalaivii, but post her allegations, Filmfare revoked her nomination and rejected her allegations in their Instagram story.

== Superlatives ==
Multiple nominations
Nominations	Film
19	Shershaah
14	83
14	Sardar Udham
11	Rashmi Rocket
10	Sandeep Aur Pinky Faraar
9	Sherni
8	Haseen Dilruba
7	Ramprasad Ki Tehrvi
6	Mimi
5	Atrangi Re
4	Chandigarh Kare Aashiqui
4	Saina
3	Bob Biswas
3	Sooryavanshi
3	Thalaivii
2	The Girl on the Train

Multiple wins
Awards	Film
9	Sardar Udham
7	Shershaah
3	Mimi
2	83

== See also ==
- Filmfare Awards
- List of Hindi films of 2021
