= Thrishanku =

2023 Indian romantic comedy film

- Theatrical release poster
- Directed by: Achyuth Vinayak
- Written by: Achyuth Vinayak; Ajith Nair
- Story by: Achyuth Vinayak
- Produced by: Sanjay Routray; Sarita Patil; Vishnu Shyamaprasad; Gayatri M
- Starring: Arjun Ashokan; Anna Ben
- Cinematography: Jayesh Mohan; Ajmal Sabu
- Edited by: Rakesh Cherumadam
- Music by: Jay Unnithan
- Production companies: Matchbox Shots; Lacuna Pictures; Clock Tower Pictures
- Release date: 26 May 2023
- Country: India
- Language: Malayalam

Thrishanku is a 2023 Indian Malayalam-language romantic comedy film written and directed by Achyuth Vinayak. It stars Arjun Ashokan and Anna Ben with Suresh Krishna, Zarin Shihab, Nandu, Fahim Safar, and Shiva Hariharan in supporting roles.

== Plot ==
Small-town couple Sethu and Megha plan to elope, but complications arise when Sethu's sister also decides to elope. Sethu goes to bring her back with his quarrelling uncles, all while trying to elope with Megha and not get caught.

== Cast ==
- Arjun Ashokan as Sethu Nair
- Anna Ben as Megha Robin
- Suresh Krishna as Biju Nair, Sethu's uncle
- Nandu as Chandrahasan Nair, Sethu's uncle
- Krishna Kumar as Robin IPS, Megha's father
- T. G. Ravi as Sethu's grandfather
- Zarin Shihab as Sumi Nair, Sethu's sister
- Balaji Sarma as CI Lakshmanan
- Fahim Safar as Franko
- Shiva Hariharan as Alex
- Balaji Mohan as himself (guest appearance)

== Production ==
The film was produced by Sanjay Routray and Sarita Patil of Matchbox Shots with Vishnu Shyamaprasad of Lacuna Pictures, while it was co-produced by Gayatri M of Clock Tower Pictures. The cinematography of the film was done by Jayesh Mohan and Ajmal Sabu, while the editing of the film was done by Rakesh Cherumadam. The teaser was released on 19 April 2023. The trailer for the film was released on 2 May 2023.

== Music ==
The music for the film was composed by Jay Unnithan.

Track listing
No.	Title	Lyrics	Singer(s)	Length
1.	"Panjimittai"	Manu Manjith	Nithinraj, Nithya Mammen	4:02
2.	"Bhoomiyumilla"	Achyuth Vinyak, Ajith Nair	Madhuvanthi Narayan	2:31
3.	"Noolamala"	Manu Manjith	Vanee Rajendra, Shivakamy Shyamaprasad, Kaanjana Sriram	3:48
4.	"Dapper Maama"	Manu Manjith	Jonita Gandhi	2:48
5.	"Thrishanku Swargam"	Manu Manjith	Jay Unnithan	4:11
Total length:				17:20

== Release ==
The film was released on 26 May 2023.

== Reception ==
Princy Alexander of Onmanorama wrote that "However, 'Thrisanku' could have done better if the makers had tapped a little into the depth of emotions between the lovers." S. R. Praveen of The Hindu wrote that "This Anna Ben-Arjun Ashokan film is a reasonably fun ride that pokes fun at traditionalists." Anna MM Vetticad of Firstpost gave 2.75 out of 5 stars and stated that "Thrishanku’s best-written characters though are Chandran who is a conservative religionist and casteist"

Sajin Shrijith of Cinema Express gave it 3.5 out of 5 stars and wrote, "It doesn't have any lofty goals, but it always maintains a light tone. It's just light escapism entertainment. It doesn't have much depth to be shown." Sanjith Sidhardhan of OTTplay gave it 2.5 out of 5 stars and wrote, "Though the film is less than two hours long, it feels stretched since many subplots connected to the characters' main journey do not have the expected effect. The film also has a drab visual presentation that doesn't help the comic components, notably in the scenes set at the Mangalore lodge."

Cris of The News Minute gave the film 3.5 out of 5 stars and wrote, "Over all, Achyuth should be commended for coming up with the story. It's hardly a thrill-ride storyline, and it's far from realistic. The plot has holes, particularly Sumi's half-baked story. However, if the makers intended for the movie to be fun, it does work."
