= Merry Christmas (2024 film) =

2024 Indian film by Sriram Raghavan

- Theatrical release poster
- Directed by: Sriram Raghavan
- Written by: Hindi Version: Sriram Raghavan; Arijit Biswas; Tamojit Das; Pooja Ladha Surti; Anukriti Pandey; Tamil Version: Pratheep Kumar S; Abdul Jabbar; Prasanna Bala Natarajan; Lata Karthikeyan
- Based on: Le Monte-charge by Frédéric Dard
- Produced by: Ramesh Taurani; Jaya Taurani; Sanjay Routray; Kewal Garg; Anish Vikramaditya
- Starring: Katrina Kaif; Vijay Sethupathi
- Cinematography: Madhu Neelakandan
- Edited by: Pooja Ladha Surti
- Music by: Songs: Pritam; Score: Daniel B. George
- Production companies: Tips Films; Matchbox Pictures
- Distributed by: Pen Marudhar Entertainment through UFO Moviez(Hindi)
- Release date: 12 January 2024
- Running time: 144 minutes
- Country: India
- Languages: Hindi; Tamil
- Budget: ₹60 crore
- Box office: ₹26.02 crore

Merry Christmas is a 2024 Indian mystery thriller film directed by Sriram Raghavan and produced by Tips Films together with Matchbox Pictures. The film, a Hindi-Tamil bilingual, stars Katrina Kaif and Vijay Sethupathi, alongside Ashwini Kalsekar, Luke Kenny, and Pari Maheshwari Sharma. The basic plot of the film was based on Frédéric Dard's French novel Le Monte-charge (Bird in a Cage).

The film was officially announced in December 2021. Principal photography commenced the same month in Mumbai along with a sporadic schedule in Uttar Pradesh, which was again followed with a schedule in the former location, and wrapped by mid-January 2023. The film has music composed by Pritam, cinematography handled by Madhu Neelakandan and editing by Pooja Ladha Surti.

After several postponements, Merry Christmas was released in theaters on 12 January 2024. The film received positive reviews, with the performances and the chemistry of Kaif and Sethupathi receiving praise.

At the 25th IIFA Awards, the film received one nomination for Best Actress (Kaif). It received five nominations at 70th Filmfare Awards including Best film (Critics) .

== Plot ==
In 1980s Bombay, Albert Arogyasami returns home after seven years on Christmas Eve. He goes to a restaurant, where he bumps into a man who seems to be running away from his date. Later, Albert meets the man's date, Maria, and informs her about the situation. Maria is with her mute daughter, Annie, who seems to be the reason the man ran away. They spend some time together, and Maria invites Albert to celebrate Christmas at her house, to which he agrees.

At Maria's house, she puts Annie to bed and spends time with Albert. They dance together and share some wine. Albert admires a Christmas tree in Maria's living room and attaches to it an ornament that he bought earlier in the day (and also shown Annie). Maria then invites Albert to take a stroll for more fun, and they explore the neighborhood festivities, forming a bond between them. Before leaving, Maria leaves a note informing her husband that she is out with a friend.

A few hours later, Maria and Albert return to her house, only to find a dead body sitting in the chair. Maria identifies the body as her husband, Jerome. The body appears to have been shot in the heart, with the gun still in his hand. Maria's earlier note is found crumpled near him. Maria tries to call the police, but Albert stops her. Albert confesses ruefully that he had just been released from prison that day after serving a seven-year sentence for the murder of his lover, Rosie. He warns that his presence will make the situation worse, as the police will likely suspect that he and Maria conspired to kill Jerome. Maria is shocked, and implores Albert to leave her house immediately. Albert leaves, asking Maria to handle the situation. Before leaving, Albert attempts to erase all evidence of his presence, such his fingerprint on the glasses etc. However, the Christmas tree no longer has the ornament he attached earlier.

Albert doesn't go home immediately. Instead, he stops at a tea stall nearby. To his surprise, he sees Maria, who should be waiting for the police at her house, rushing off somewhere. He follows her to a church, where Maria is again at the church. Maria fakes fainting, prompting a fellow attendee at the church, Ronnie, who is attracted to Maria, to offer help. Ronnie intends to have a connection with her by assisting her. Albert, still determined to uncover the truth, also offers help. Together, Ronnie and Albert (acting as a stranger) take Maria back to her house, where Albert is shocked to find that Jerome's dead body and all evidence of the crime have disappeared. The house now looks completely normal. Albert again sees his ornament. on the tree.

Ronnie intentionally leaves his wallet on Maria's couch, secretly looking forward to an excuse to return later. At this point, Maria claims she left something at the church and needs to retrieve it. Ronnie, wanting to pursue Maria offers to drop Albert off on the way. Albert, pretending to go back to his house instead goes to Maria's manor, where he is stunned to again see Jerome's dead body, and again, no ornament on the tree. Soon Maria and Ronnie arrive to an identical crime scene from hours ago. Maria, again reacting surprised implores Ronnie to call the police. However, she sees Albert in the house who she pushes out of the back door.

Ronnie calls the police, suggesting to Maria that they leave Albert's name out of the story as he only plans to be in the city for day, and it would be unfair to drag him into the mess. Meanwhile an escaping Albert is forced to retreat back into Maria's building as he sees the police outside. However, he stumbles upon an entrance of a different floor.

While Maria and Ronnie give their statement to the police on a different floor, Albert begins to realizes what has been happening:

Maria has two identical apartments — one above with Jerome's dead body and one below that is clean of any crime. Maria first invites guests to the clean house, where nothing appears suspicious. Then she takes the guests out and returns to the house above, where Jerome's dead body is. Since the two houses are only one floor apart, and due to impeccable planning of the interior decor, most ordinary humans will not notice they are being taken to another exactly identical apartment, particularly since they always take the elevator, where Maria typically creates a distraction. Most guests would think they are and they were, in the same house. This creates a perfect alibi for Maria, as any guest would confidently testify that Maria was with them the entire time when Jerome was found dead.

Once the police and Ronnie depart, Maria enters her fake apartment with a chainsaw to begin destroying evidence of her duplicity. She is once again shocked to see Albert and attempts to attack him. He on the other hand calms her down and offers to help her destroy the evidence. While participating in heavy-duty destruction, they also uncover Ronnie's wallet. While Maria suggests they burn it, Albert offers to drop in the Church lost and found, unknowing that Ronnie had intentionally slipped the wallet into the sofa crevice upon his initial visit.

The next day Albert is called to the police station where he is interrogated about the previous night's events. He also leaves a paper swan on the inspector's desk before entering the interrogation room. Intermittently, Maria is also called in to give her confession. While she initially leaves Albert out of her statement, seeing the swan (Albert's signature which he had also made for her the night before), Maria mentions that she forgot to mention that another man also helped her in the Church. As Albert exits the interrogation room, he sees both Maria and Ronnie in the station.

When Ronnie is asked to give his statement, he confesses to intentionally leaving his wallet in the house, and suspects that a thief may have entered the house and killed Jerome in an attempt to flee. Albert is asked for his release papers during which he accidentally pulls out Ronnie's wallet from his pocket but quickly hides it before anyone notices. When all three members are released to leave, Annie suddenly is able to speak once again, announcing that Santa (Albert) had given her the Christmas ornament.

Maria hugs Annie in glee. The police are shocked, realizing there might be a conspiracy involving Maria. In a last minute twist, Albert comes forward and presents Ronnie's wallet to the police, with a guilty looking facial expression. He also pulls put a ring from his pocket, presumably the one that he intended to give to his ex-girlfriend Rosie, offering some motive for his killing of Jerome to remove attention away from Maria. The film ends as Maria instead puts her hand out for Albert to place the ring on her finger. Albert happily obliges and takes a seat on the suspects bench.

== Cast ==
As per the film's closing credits:

- Vijay Sethupathi as Albert Arogyaswami
- Katrina Kaif as Maria
- Tinnu Anand (Hindi) / Rajesh (Tamil) as Yadhoom Uncle
- Sanjay Kapoor (Hindi) / Kavin Jay Babu (Tamil) as Ronnie
- Ashwini Kalsekar as Scarlett, Ronnie's wife
- Luke Kenny as Jerome, Maria's husband
- Pari Maheshwari Sharma as Annie, Maria's daughter
- Vinay Pathak as Police inspector Paresh Kamdar (Hindi)
  - Shanmugarajan as Police inspector S. Devaraj (Tamil)
- Pratima Kazmi (Hindi) / Radhika Sarathkumar (Tamil) as Police constable Lakshmi

=== Cameo appearances ===
- Radhika Apte as Rosie
- Gayathrie as a singer
- Sahil Vaid as Maria's date

== Production ==
=== Development ===
In January 2021, it was reported that director Sriram Raghavan had put his directorial venture Ekkis, starring Varun Dhawan, on hold due to the COVID-19 pandemic and began working on a new project, which he reportedly approached Katrina Kaif and Saif Ali Khan to play the lead roles. Although Khan okayed the script, he was replaced by Tamil actor Vijay Sethupathi since the film required a fresh pairing. The film's launch was reported to be made in April, however, due to the second wave of COVID-19 pandemic and Kaif testing positive for COVID-19, the launch was delayed. On 25 December, the film was officially announced with Ramesh Taurani and Sanjay Routray as producers. The title "Merry Christmas" was suggested by Dinesh Vijan, when the director considered titles containing the word "raat" (night) such as Raat Akeli Hai, Raat Ke Hamsafar and Baat Ek Raat Ki.

=== Casting ===
Director Sriram Raghavan initially approached Saif Ali Khan for the role of Albert, since they had worked together in Ek Hasina Thi and Agent Vinod. Khan liked the subject of the movie and accepted the role, but later, the director changed his mind and selected Vijay Sethupathi for the lead role of Albert, thinking that Khan would not be the right fit for the role.

Producer Ramesh, while speaking to ETimes, said "Vijay suited the role perfectly so we approached him for this film." and "Katrina was always our only choice for the role right from the beginning." In early March 2022, Sanjay Kapoor was announced to play an important role in the Hindi version of the film. In April, Radhika Sarathkumar was also announced being a part of the cast of the Tamil version. Vinay Pathak was announced as a part of the cast of the Hindi version in August. He was further more said to be playing a key role in the film. Shanmugarajan reprises Vinay Pathak's role in the Tamil version. In July 2023, Ashwini Kalsekar and Radhika Apte were announced to be playing a cameo in the film.

=== Filming ===
The principal photography began on 25 December 2021, with the first schedule in Mumbai. The shooting was put on hold in early January 2022, due to the rise of COVID-cases. The shooting started again in early February in Filmistan Studio in Mumbai. Sanjay started filming his portions in March. Katrina continued filming her portions on 11 March. The first schedule concluded in March.The second schedule commenced on 19 March in a studio in Chitrakoot. The schedule was said to be 45-days long.

Raadhika Sarathkumar started filming her portions in April. Due to a fire incident in the district in August, the schedule was moved to a studio in Vrindavan. The second schedule finished in November. In the third schedule, which commenced in November in Mumbai, pictures of Katrina, Sethupathi and Kapoor from the sets were released on social media's by paparazzi's. Further more pictures were taken few more days after the former. The principal photography wrapped in January 2023, with an official confirmation on Sethupathi's birthday.

=== Post-production ===
Raghavan started the post-production works in mid November 2022, as the filming was in the last schedule. Raghavan, in May 2023, revealed that the film is a bilingual film, meaning that it was simultaneously shot in Hindi and Tamil languages. The film marks Raghavan's and Kaif's debut in Tamil cinema. Each version will reportedly have a different set of co-actors. Deepa Venkat dubbed for Katrina's character in the Tamil version of the film.

== Music ==
Merry Christmas

Soundtrack album by Pritam
- Released: 24 January 2024
- Recorded: 2021–22
- Genre: Feature film soundtrack
- Length: 19:08 (Hindi); 14:36 (Tamil)
- Languages: Hindi; Telugu; Tamil
- Label: Tips Music

Pritam chronology
Dunki (2023)	Merry Christmas (2024)	Chandu Champion (2024)

The music is composed by Pritam, marking his Tamil debut. The audio rights were acquired by Tips Music. The first single titled "Merry Christmas Title Track" was released on 25 December 2023. The second single titled "Nazar Teri Toofan" was released on 4 January 2024. The third single titled "Raat Akeli Thi" was released on 10 January 2024.

All lyrics are written by Varun Grover.

Hindi
No.	Title	Singer(s)	Length
1.	"Merry Christmas (Title Track)"	Sunidhi Chauhan	2:32
2.	"Nazar Teri Toofan"	Raghav Chaitanya	4:03
3.	"Raat Akeli Thi"	Tushar Joshi & Shilpa Rao	4:26
4.	"Dil Ki Mez"	Shalmali Kholgade	3:37
5.	"Nazar Teri Toofan" (Film Version)	Papon	4:04
6.	"Raat Akeli Thi" (Film Version)	Arijit Singh & Antara Mitra	4:26
7.	"Merry Christmas (Title Song)" (Male Version)	Ash King	2:34
Total length:			25:42

All lyrics are written by Yugabharathi.

Tamil
No.	Title	Singer(s)	Length
1.	"Merry Christmas - Title Track"	Benny Dayal	2:32
2.	"Anbe Vidai"	Sreerama Chandra	4:03
3.	"Kanadha Kadal"	Karthik, Anusha Mani	4:24
4.	"Neela Ravile"	Jonita Gandhi	3:37
Total length:			14:36

== Release ==
=== Theatrical ===
Merry Christmas was initially set to release in cinemas on 23 December 2022, but got delayed due to production delays. Then it was planned for a December 2023 release, before being rescheduled to 12 January 2024.

=== Home media ===
The streaming rights were bought by Netflix for ₹60 crore (US$6.2 million) and premiered on 8 March 2024.

== Reception ==
=== Critical response ===
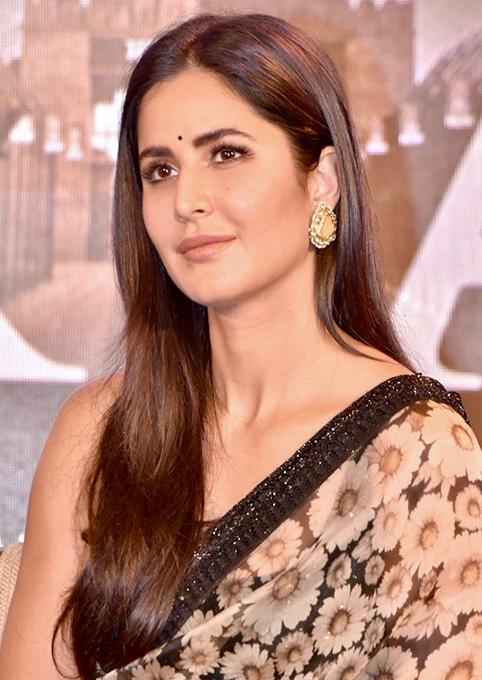
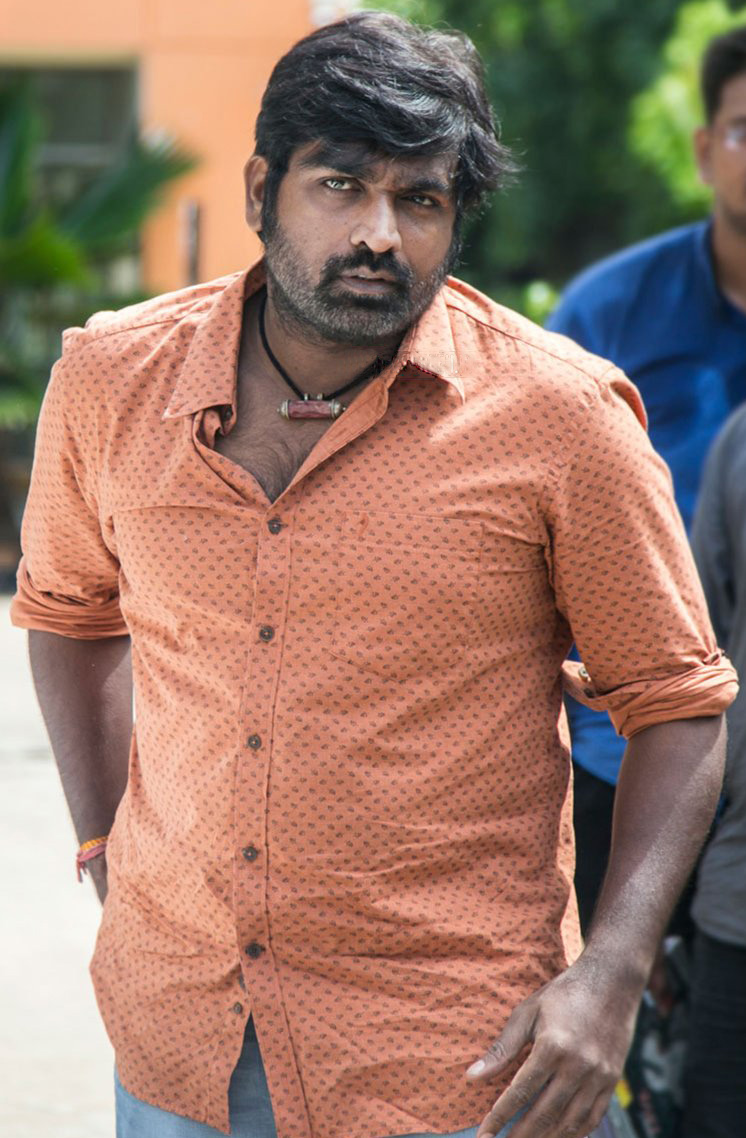
Critics praised the performances of Katrina Kaif and Vijay Sethupathi.

Merry Christmas received positive reviews from critics and audiences, particularly praising the performances and the chemistry of Kaif and Sethupathi. On the review aggregator website Rotten Tomatoes, 85% of 20 critics' reviews are positive, with an average rating of 6.5/10.

In Film Companion, Rahul Desai described the film as "exceptional and remarkably moving… a sublime deconstruction of the romantic thriller" and highlighted the "self-contained" chemistry between Kaif and Sethupathi. He praised the duo's performances and especially singled out Kaif for giving "a performance within a performance", in which she "nails the ambiguity of a mother disguised as a woman". Saibal Chatterjee of NDTV gave 3.5 stars out of 5 and hailed the film as "a delightfully inventive cinematic ride that employs a very 1980s Hindi cinema soundscape and an evocative and transportive colour palette". He liked the contrast between Kaif and Sethupathi and opined that the former gave "one of most convincing screen performances of her career, portraying confusion and vulnerability cloaked in occasional flashes of steely determination". Shubhra Gupta of The Indian Express gave 3 stars out of 5 and felt that "Despite their unusual pairing, Katrina Kaif and Vijay Sethupathi manage to work together, as she once more demonstrates her acting prowess behind all the pancake and bump-and-grind. Monika Rawal Kukreja of Hindustan Times said that "You won't jump out of this Vijay Sethupathi and Katrina Kaif film when it comes to any major surprise or the conclusion, but you will enjoy excellent cinematography clever writing and an interesting movie that keeps you on the edge of your seat. Even if you only see it once, Sriram Raghavan's cinematic universe is worth watching.

Anuj Kumar of The Hindu called the movie "a sumptuous slice of crime" and said, "In this noirish story of a long night, Katrina Kaif and Vijay Sethupathi make a surprising duo that works well together. The story's crux is more interesting than the conclusion." Sukanya Verma of Rediff.com gave 4 stars out of 5 and praised the performance and direction, she wrote "You'll be sighing in Merry Christmas as you've never sighed in a Sriram Raghavan film before thanks to its amazing climax." Lachmi Deb Roy of Firstpost wrote in her review that "The movie is guaranteed to bring back fond memories for everyone who loves Bombay, particularly for those who adore the Regal theatre, Colaba's alleyways, and the ancient, architecturally stunning homes. The leisurely pacing of the film adds to its allure. Undoubtedly, a Merry Christmas is a unique experience." Giving the film 4 stars, Devesh Sharma of Filmfare summarised it as "a dark comedy that will make you smile and scratch your head at the same time... a noir that showcases the triumph of human spirit and compassion". He further praised Sethupathi for delivering "another solid performance" and Kaif for showing "she can stand and deliver... in perhaps, her first full-fledged dramatic role".

== Accolades ==
Award	Ceremony date	Category	Recipients	Result	Ref.
International Indian Film Academy Awards	9 March 2025	Best Actress	Katrina Kaif	Nominated	
Zee Cine Awards	17 May 2025	Best Actress	Katrina Kaif	Nominated	
70th Filmfare Awards	11 October 2025	Best Film (Critics)	Sriram Raghavan	Nominated	
70th Filmfare Awards	11 October 2025	Best Art Direction	Mayur Sharma	Nominated	
70th Filmfare Awards	11 October 2025	Best Background Score	Daniel B. Gerorge	Nominated	
70th Filmfare Awards	11 October 2025	Best Lyricist	Varun Grover	Nominated	

== Trivia ==
When Vijay Setupati buys cinema ticket, it shows 'Roxy Cinema' as the name of the theater on the ticket. However, it is actually Regal Theater.
