= Khauf =

2025 Indian television series

- Promotional release poster
- Genre: Horror; Thriller
- Written by: Smita Singh
- Directed by: Pankaj Kumar; Surya Balakrishnan
- Starring: Monika Panwar; Rajat Kapoor; Abhishek Chauhan; Geetanjali Kulkarni; Shilpa Shukla; Chum Darang
- Country of origin: India
- Original language: Hindi
- No. of episodes: 8

Production
- Producers: Sanjay Routray; Sarita Patil
- Cinematography: Pankaj Kumar
- Camera setup: Multiple-camera
- Running time: 43–50 minutes
- Production company: Matchbox Shots

Original release
- Network: Amazon Prime Video
- Release: 18 April 2025

Khauf (transl. Fear) is a 2025 Indian Hindi-language horror thriller television series written by Smita Singh and directed by Pankaj Kumar and Surya Balakrishnan. Produced under Matchbox Shots, starring Monika Panwar, Rajat Kapoor, Abhishek Chauhan, Geetanjali Kulkarni and Shilpa Shukla. The series premiered on Amazon Prime Video on 18 April 2025. The series is a partial and unofficial remake of the South Korean psychological horror series, Strangers from Hell.

== Synopsis ==
The series begins with a woman named Anu returning to the hostel after her work shift and is seen walking a narrow and deserted lane. While approaching the gate, a laser red light is cast upon her from the forest and she becomes agitated and starts screaming for the guard. Present day, Madhu is moving to Delhi from Gwalior. She has come to Delhi to be with her boyfriend, Arun and to get a fresh start after getting sexually assaulted at her college annual day by unknown masked men. Madhu sees Delhi as a chance to leave those memories behind. She is helped by her friend Bella and her boyfriend Nakul, whom she feels that the latter might be her assaulter. She feels uncomfortable to live in the flat in which her boyfriend shares with other male friends. It happens that Bella sends Madhu the location of the hostel, which Nakul found earlier and so on the day, she decides to visit the hostel with Arun. Pragati Working Women Hostel is a rundown government facility run by Warden, Gracie Dungdung where she is allotted the room 333. After much deliberation, she finally moves to the hostel and is met with extreme hostility by the other girls in the same wing, who never leave the hostel to go out. They warn her to not move to the hostel and leave while she can. She feels the presence of something supernatural and brushes it off while suspecting Nakul of being one of the men who assaulted her. Madhu starts to doubt her own sanity as strange things start occurring in the hostel room.

== Cast ==
- Monika Panwar as Madhu
- Rajat Kapoor as Hakim
- Abhishek Chauhan as Arun
- Geetanjali Kulkarni as Constable Ilu Mishra
- Shilpa Shukla as Dr. Shohini Varma
- Chum Darang as Svetlana
- Asheema Vadaan as Anu/Preeti
- Rashmi Zurail Mann as Nikki
- Priyanka Setia as Rima
- Riya Shukla as Komal
- Gagan Arora as Nakul
- Shalini Vatsa as Warden Gracie Dungdung
- Arista Mehta as Kiara
- Talib Mehdi as Inspector Inder Bhatia
- Satyam Sharma as Jeeva
- Delzad Hiwale as Babban

== Episodes ==
No.	Title	Original release date	Prod. code
1	"Ladies Hostel"	18 April 2025	108085
2	"Stalker"	18 April 2025	TBA
3	"Venom"	18 April 2025	TBA
4	"Fever"	18 April 2025	TBA
5	"Possessed"	18 April 2025	TBA
6	"Trap"	18 April 2025	TBA
7	"Happy New Year"	18 April 2025	TBA
8	"The Reverie"	18 April 2025	TBA

== Production ==
On 19 March 2024, the series was announced by Amazon Prime Video. The post-production was completed in 2024.

== Release ==
The teaser was released on 20 March 2024 and the trailer was released on 11 April 2025.

The series was made available to stream on Amazon Prime Video on 18 April 2025.

== Reception ==
Abhimanyu Mathur of Hindustan Times gave the series 3 stars out of 5 stars and observed, "[...] regardless of its faults, Khauf holds up well. It is an important show, and more importantly, a well-made one, which expertly introduces real-world issues in the world of horror, without sermonising or preaching, or compromising on the spooks and thrills."

Shubhra Gupta of The Indian Express gave the series 3 stars out of 5 and wrote, "The series works best when its women, with all their pain and their messy back stories, are on screen, doing their thing."

Archika Khurana of The Times of India gave 3.5 stars out of 5 and wrote in her review, "For fans of psychological horror with a social conscience, Khauf offers plenty to think about — even if it doesn't always chill to the bone."

Rahul Desai of The Hollywood Reporter India praised the series and wrote, "Khauf is the kind of show that Indian streaming was always supposed to champion — it's ambitious, original, inventive, messy and an eerily layered reminder of how supernatural stories are rooted in the fear of natural living."

Udita Jhunjhunwala of Scroll.in wrote about the series, "[...] its incessant and bloody violence, the misogyny and denigration of women, and the sheer hopelessness it conveys, Khauf is unsettling and exhausting."

Shubham Kulkarni of OTT Play gave the series 4 stars out of 5 and wrote, "What happens when a properly cooked script meets a bunch of supremely seasoned actors? Shows like Khauf are born and they teach how 'content' is done without an algorithm."

Vinamra Mathur of Firstpost gave the series 3 stars out of 5 and wrote, "Khauf isn't just a run of the mill horror drama. It flirts with the idea of what it feels and takes to be a woman in 2025, the perverted world filled with promiscuous men, and battling loneliness in an unknown city with strangers all around. The title has more meanings than one."

Shreyas Pande of Cinema Express gave the series 3 stars out of 5 and wrote, "In Khauf, there is an ambition to do better, the dread is real, the atmosphere thick—but just when it should have all come together, it fades into fog. What begins with a promise of chills ends with barely a shiver."

Rishil Jogani of Pinkvilla have the series 3 stars out of 5 and commented, "Khauf is a compelling addition to the horror-thriller genre, distinguished by its psychological depth and emotional resonance. While it falters slightly with pacing and occasional clichés, its strong performances, atmospheric dread, and focus on personal trauma make it a standout."

Troy Ribeiro of Free Press Journal wrote, "Khauf is a gripping horror series where haunted hostels, buried trauma and emotional scars collide—delivering a chilling exploration of fear, silence and survival through a richly atmospheric and psychologically intense narrative".

Shachi Chaturvedi of Mid Day wrote in her review, "Khauf isn't just about a haunted room, it's about what haunts women every single day—the fear of existing. If a show like Khauf goes unnoticed, meaningful storytelling will be lost. With the weekend approaching, grab your popcorn, grab the tissues (you'll need them), and get ready for a show worth your time."
