= All India Rank =

2023 Indian film by Varun Grover

- Theatrical release poster
- Directed by: Varun Grover
- Written by: Varun Grover
- Produced by: Sanjay Routray; Sarita Patil; Diksha Jyoti Routray
- Starring: Bodhisattva Sharma; Shashi Bhushan; Samta Sudiksha; Geeta Agarwal Sharma; Sheeba Chaddha
- Cinematography: Archana Ghangrekar
- Edited by: Sanyukta Kaza
- Music by: Mayukh-Mainak
- Production company: Matchbox Shots
- Distributed by: Kaarmic Films
- Release dates: 4 February 2023 (IFFR); 23 February 2024 (India)
- Running time: 94 minutes
- Country: India
- Language: Hindi
- Box office: ₹35 lakh

All India Rank is a 2023 Indian Hindi-language coming of age comedy drama film directed and written by Varun Grover and produced by Matchbox Shots. The film marks Grover's debut as a feature-film director. The film stars Bodhisattva Sharma in a lead role alongside Shashi Bhushan, Samta Sudiksha, Geeta Agarwal Sharma, and Sheeba Chaddha. It was the closing film at the 52nd IFFR. The film was released theatrically on 23 February 2024 to positive reviews from critics.

== Plot ==
Vivek is 17, and as every middle-class family in India would attest, it was high time he was enrolled in coaching classes for the notoriously competitive entrance exams of the Indian Institutes of Technology (IITs). Vivek's father, who sees an IIT degree as a moral certificate, ships his only son off to a residential preparatory school in Kota, the Haridwar for IIT coaching. Over two years, Vivek goes through the motions of Indian adolescence, but it is his parents who do the growing up. As time passes, Vivek's father learns that there are those with low morale who are studying in IITs, leading him to cryptically tell Vivek that IIT is not the end-goal in life on the night before his IIT entrance exam.

== Cast ==
- Bodhisattva Sharma as Vivek Singh
- Samta Sudiksha as Sarika Kumari
- Shashi Bhushan as Ramesh Kumar Singh, Vivek's father
- Geeta Agarwal Sharma as Manju Singh, Vivek's mother
- Sheeba Chaddha as Kalpana Bundela
- Kailash Gowthaman as Rahul Reddy
- Ayush Pandey as Rinku Yadav
- Neeraj Singh as Chandan
- Vidit Singh as Ishaan
- Ananyabrata Chakravorty as S. K. Joshi
- Saadat Khan as Shawn Michael / Mohit Verma

== Production ==
=== Development ===
Director Varun Grover announced the film on 13 April 2022, revealing that it is produced by Sanjay Routray and Sarita Patil. Cinematography is done by Archana Ghangrekar, and editing is done by Sanyukta Kaza.

== Release ==
All India Rank had its world premiere on 5 February 2023 at the 52nd International Film Festival Rotterdam, as the closing film. It was released theatrically on 23 February 2024 in India.

== Soundtrack ==
All India Rank

Soundtrack album by Mayukh-Mainak
- Released: 14 February 2024
- Genre: Feature film soundtrack
- Length: 15:55
- Language: Hindi
- Label: Tips Industries

The music of the film was composed by Mayukh-Mainak while lyrics are written by Varun Grover.

Track listing
No.	Title	Singer(s)	Length
1.	"Noodle Sa Dil"	Aditi Paul	2:52
2.	"Sab Achhi Baatein Hain"	Araham Khan, Bodhisattva Sharma	3:00
3.	"Choice Hi Nahin Hai"	Sumit Roy	2:53
4.	"Thehar Zara"	Vishal Bhardwaj	4:07
5.	"Haq Hai"	Shahid Mallya	3:43
Total length:			15:55

== Reception ==
=== Critical response ===
On the review aggregator website Rotten Tomatoes, 62% of 13 critics' reviews are positive, with an average rating of 6.2/10. Shubhra Gupta of The Indian Express scored the film at 3 out of 5 stars and said, "Varun Grover's debut feature is a deftly-drawn, affectionate portrait of a young man who is being blown along by the force of his father's dreams." Saibal Chatterjee of NDTV gave film 4 stars out of 5 and wrote, "All India Rank abounds in wonderfully striking touches that elevate it above the sum of its parts and turn it into a perceptive, holistic testament to a time of flux. Watch it because it takes you where Hindi films rarely do - a zone where ideas, feelings and barely stated dilemmas take precedence over the exigencies of plot and exposition." Mayank Shekhar of Mid-Day gave 3 stars out of 5 and reviewed the film, describing it as "a sweet, sincere, personal film".

Sana Farzeen of India Today gave the film 3 out of 5 stars, and wrote, "All India Rank, passes most of the criteria needed in a good film and yet, it falls short on entertainment value". Shilajit Mitra of The Hindu reviewed film and wrote, "This coming-of-age drama about the IIT-ian dream is humorous and observant, yet hardly stands out in a sea of similar-minded content." Nandini Ramnath of Scroll.in in her review, wrote, "The film's low-energy hero and fatalistic mood – the promise of the 1990s notwithstanding – are difficult to sustain over the 101-minute runtime. Grover's screenplay has a collection of finely written episodes that compensate for Vivek's feeble, familiar coming-of-age experience."

=== Box office ===
The film collected ₹15 lakh (US$16,000) – ₹20 lakh (US$21,000) on its opening day.
