= Varun Grover (writer) =

Indian lyricist, writer, stand-up comedian and filmmaker

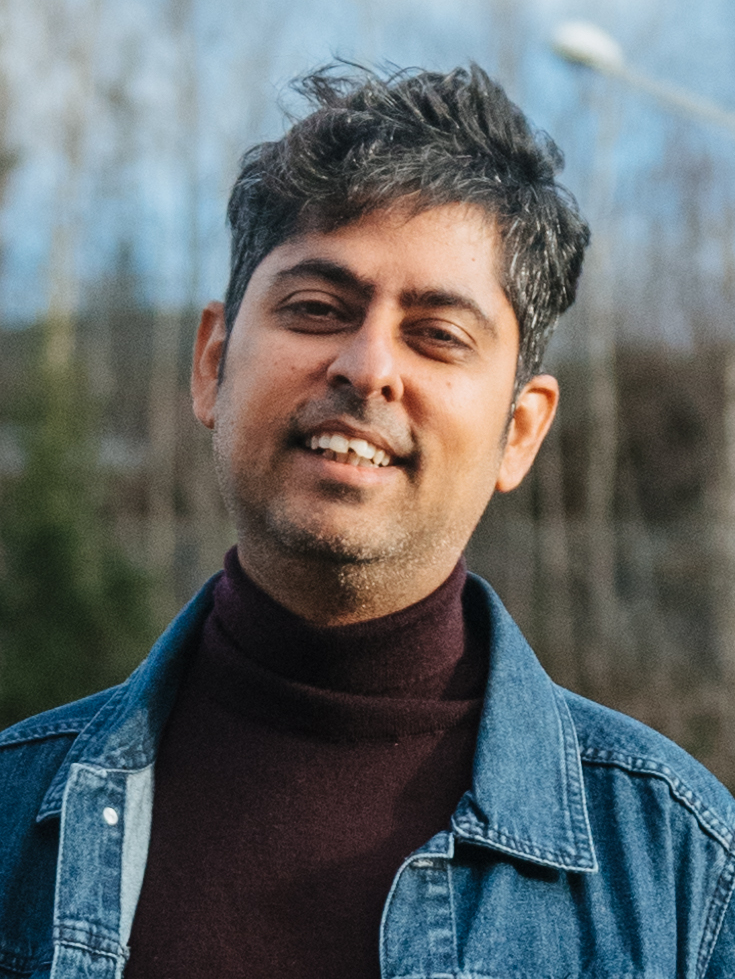
- Grover in Stockholm in 2024
- Born: 26 January 1980 (age 46); Sundernagar, Himachal Pradesh, India
- Education: Indian Institute of Technology (BHU) Varanasi
- Occupations: Lyricist; director; screenwriter; stand-up comedian; actor
- Spouse: Raj Kumari
- Writing career
- Years active: 2004—present
- Notable works: Masaan, Udta Punjab, Dum Laga Ke Haisha, Sacred Games, RRR
- Website: varungrover.co

Varun Grover (born 26 January 1980) is an Indian lyricist, writer, stand-up comedian and filmmaker. He won the award for Best Lyricist at the 63rd National Film Awards in 2015. He co-created the political satire group Aisi Taisi Democracy, and his debut film, All India Rank, closed the 52nd Rotterdam International Film Festival, in 2023. Grover also performs stand-up comedy, writes poetry and acts.

== Early life and education ==
Grover was born in Sundernagar, Himachal Pradesh, to a school-teacher mother and army engineer father, and belongs to a Punjabi Hindu family. His paternal grandfather originally lived in Faisalabad, a city in the Punjab Province of British India. After the partition of India, Faisalabad became a part of the West Punjab province of Pakistan, due to which he moved to Jagadhri in present-day Haryana, where he settled and eventually started a business of sign painting for shops. In the early 1950s, a cinema hall opened in Jagadhri wherein he went on to design posters for the hall. He instructed his two elder sons, Varun's uncles and his father's brothers, to also make such posters. This led the family to gain an interest in watching movies, many of which they watched at the same cinema hall, in which Varun's grandfather also took his father. Varun accredits this for his interest in films, as he "inherited the same addiction from [his] father".

Varun spent his initial years in Dehradun, Uttarakhand and Sundernagar, before moving to Lucknow for his adolescent years. In Lucknow He took coaching from Rubics Rostrum for engineering He studied civil engineering at Indian Institute of Technology (BHU) Varanasi, graduating in 2003. He began his career as a software consultant with the multinational company Kanbay in Pune, where he worked for nearly a year. In 2004, Varun Grover moved to Mumbai to pursue his passion for writing. The following year, he secured an opportunity to script for the television series The Great Indian Comedy Show. In 2018, collection of short stories for children, called Paper Chor was published in Hindi.

=== Music ===
In 2017, Varun Grover released Beete Dino Ke Geet, a song in collaboration with US-based producer Krishna Chetan.

=== Comedy ===
In 2025, Varun Grover released his standup special Nothing Makes Sense.

== Discography ==
Title	Year	Artist	Album	Notes
"Yeh Ek Zindagi"	2022	Achint Thakkar	Monica, O My Darling	
"Suno Jaanejaan"	2022	Achint Thakkar	Monica, O My Darling	
"Bye Bye Adios"	2022	Achint Thakkar	Monica, O My Darling	
"Farsh Pe Khade"	2022	Achint Thakkar	Monica, O My Darling	
"Hari Har"	2022	Shankar–Ehsaan–Loy	Samrat Prithviraj	
"Hadd Kar De"	2022	Shankar–Ehsaan–Loy	Samrat Prithviraj	
"Makhmali"	2022	Shankar–Ehsaan–Loy	Samrat Prithviraj	
"Yoddha"	2022	Shankar–Ehsaan–Loy	Samrat Prithviraj	
"Shauq"	2022	Amit Trivedi	Qala	
"Noodle Sa Dil"	2023	Mayukh-Mainak	All India Rank	
"Sab Achhi Baatein Hain"	2023	Mayukh-Mainak	All India Rank	
"Choice Hi Nahin Hai"	2023	Mayukh-Mainak	All India Rank	
"Thehar Zara"	2023	Mayukh-Mainak	All India Rank	
"Haq Hai"	2023	Mayukh-Mainak	All India Rank	
"Chal Ve Watna"	2023	Pritam	Dunki	
"Merry Christmas"	2024	Pritam	Merry Christmas	
"Nazar Teri Toofan"	2024	Pritam	Merry Christmas	
"Raat Akeli Thi"	2024	Pritam	Merry Christmas	
"Dil Ki Mez"	2024	Pritam	Merry Christmas	
"Tenu Sang Rakhna"	2024	Achint Thakkar	Jigra	
"Jiya"	2024	Achint Thakkar	Jigra	
"Jigra"	2024	Achint Thakkar	Jigra	
"Jigra" (Acoustic)	2024	Achint Thakkar	Jigra	
"Pan India Area King"	2024	Achint Thakkar	Jigra	Co-written with Achint Thakkar
"Phoolon Ka Taaro Ka"	2024	R. D. Burman, Achint Thakkar	Jigra	Co-written with Anand Bakshi

== Filmography ==
=== Films ===
Year	Title	Credited as				
Year	Title	Lyricist	Writer	Director	Actor	Notes
2006	Ghoom	No	Dialogues	No	No	
2009	Accident on Hill Road	No	Dialogues	No	No	
2011	That Girl in Yellow Boots	Yes	No	No	No	
2012	Peddlers	Yes	No	No	No	
2012	Gangs of Wasseypur – Part 1	Yes	No	No	No	
2012	Gangs of Wasseypur – Part 2	Yes	No	No	No	
2013	Prague	Yes	No	No	No	
2014	Katiyabaaz	Yes	No	No	No	
2014	Ankhon Dekhi	Yes	No	No	No	
2015	Dum Laga Ke Haisha	Yes	No	No	No	Won National Film Award for Best Lyrics
2015	Bombay Velvet	Yes	No	No	Yes	
2015	Masaan	Yes	Yes	No	No	
2016	Zubaan	Yes	No	No	No	
2016	Fan	Yes	No	No	No	
2016	Raman Raghav 2.0	Yes	No	No	No	
2016	Udta Punjab	Yes	No	No	No	
2017	Newton	Yes	No	No	No	
2018	Kaala	Yes	No	No	No	
2018	Sui Dhaaga	Yes	No	No	No	
2019	Sonchiriya	Yes	No	No	No	
2021	Sandeep Aur Pinky Faraar	No	Yes	No	No	Won Filmfare award for Best Dialogue
2022	RRR	Yes	No	No	No	Lyricist for the Hindi version
2022	Badhaai Do	Yes	No	No	No	
2022	Monica, O My Darling	Yes	No	No	No	
2022	Samrat Prithviraj	Yes	No	No	No	
2022	Kiss	No	Yes	Yes	No	Directorial Debut, Short film
2022	Qala	Yes	No	No	Yes	
2023	Dunki	Yes	No	No	No	
2024	Merry Christmas	Yes	No	No	No	
2024	All India Rank	Yes	Yes	Yes	No	Directorial Debut, Feature Film
2024	Jigra	Yes	No	No	No	
2024	Chashma	No	Yes	No	No	
2025	Superboys Of Malegaon	No	Yes	No	No	
2025	Homebound	No	Dialogues	No	No	

=== Television ===
Year	Title	Credited as
2004–2006	The Great Indian Comedy Show	Writer
2007	SAB Ka Bheja Fry	Writer
2007–2008	Ranvir Vinay Aur Kaun?	Writer
2008–2009	Oye! It's Friday!	Writer
2008–2009	10 Ka Dum	Writer
2009	Ghar Ki Baat Hai	Writer
2009–2013	Jay Hind!	Writer
2018–2019	Sacred Games	Writer and Executive producer

== Books ==
- Paper Chor (2018), Jugnoo Prakashan
- Biksu (2019), Ektara India
- Karejwa (2020), Bakarmaxindia

== Awards and nominations ==
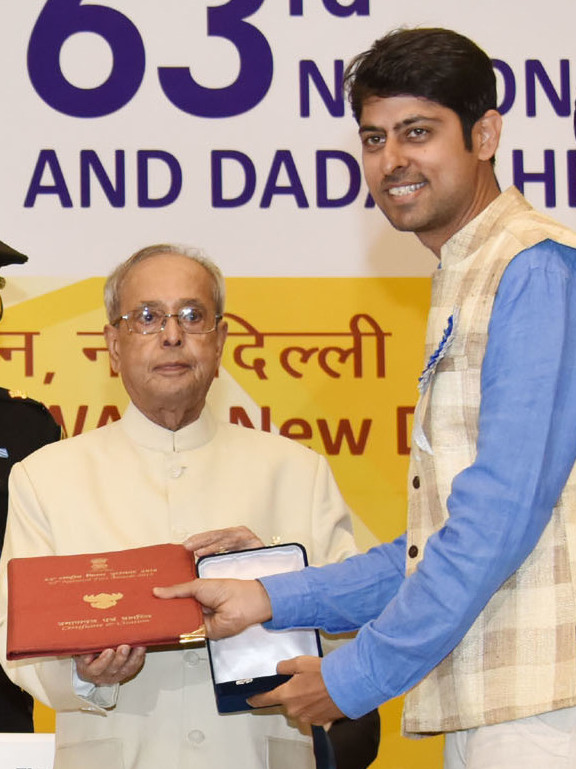
Grover at the 63rd National Film Awards receiving the Best Lyrics award for Dum Laga Ke Haisha from President Pranab Mukherjee

Award	Year	Work	Category	Result	Ref.
Apsara Film & Television Producers Guild Award	2013	"Womaniya"–Gangs of Wasseypur – Part 1	Best Lyrics	Nominated	
Apsara Film & Television Producers Guild Award	2016	"Moh Moh Ke Dhaage"	Best Lyrics	Won	
Filmfare Awards	2016	"Moh Moh Ke Dhaage"–Dum Laga Ke Haisha	Best Lyricist	Nominated	
Filmfare Awards	2022	Sandeep Aur Pinky Faraar	Best Story	Nominated	
Filmfare Awards	2022	Sandeep Aur Pinky Faraar	Best Screenplay	Nominated	
Filmfare Awards	2022	Sandeep Aur Pinky Faraar	Best Dialogue	Won	
Filmfare Awards	2025	All India Rank	Best Debut Director	Nominated	
Filmfare Awards	2025	"Raat Akeli Thi" – Merry Christmas	Best Lyricist	Nominated	
Global Indian Music Academy Awards	2016	"Moh Moh Ke Dhaage"–Dum Laga Ke Haisha	Best Lyricist	Won	
Global Indian Music Academy Awards	2016	"Moh Moh Ke Dhaage"–Dum Laga Ke Haisha	Best Film Song	Nominated	
Mirchi Music Awards	2014	"Aayi Bahar"–Ankhon Dekhi	Raag-Inspired Song of the Year	Nominated	
Mirchi Music Awards	2016	"Moh Moh Ke Dhaage"–Dum Laga Ke Haisha	Lyricist of the Year	Won	
Mirchi Music Awards	2017	Udta Punjab	Album of the Year	Nominated	
National Film Awards	2016	"Moh Moh Ke Dhaage"–Dum Laga Ke Haisha	Best Lyrics	Won	
Times of India Film Awards	2016	Dum Laga Ke Haisha	Best Lyrics	Won	
Zee Cine Awards	2016	"Moh Moh Ke Dhaage"–Dum Laga Ke Haisha	Best Lyricist	Won	

== See also ==
- List of Indian comedians
- List of stand-up comedians
