= Rashmi Rocket =

2021 Indian film directed by Akarsh Khurana

- Official release poster
- Directed by: Akarsh Khurana
- Screenplay by: Aniruddha Guha
- Dialogues by: Kanika Dhillon
- Story by: Nandha Periyasamy
- Produced by: Ronnie Screwvala; Neha Anand; Pranjal Khandhdiya
- Starring: Taapsee Pannu; Priyanshu Painyuli; Abhishek Banerjee
- Cinematography: Neha Parti Matiyani
- Edited by: Ajay Sharma; Shweta Venkat Matthew
- Music by: Amit Trivedi
- Production companies: RSVP Movies; Mango People Media Network
- Distributed by: ZEE5
- Release date: 15 October 2021
- Running time: 129 minutes
- Country: India
- Language: Hindi

Rashmi Rocket is a 2021 Indian Hindi-language sports drama film directed by Akarsh Khurana and produced by Ronnie Screwvala. It stars Taapsee Pannu as the titular character alongside Abhishek Banerjee and Priyanshu Painyuli. The film premiered on 15 October 2021 on ZEE5.

== Cast ==
- Taapsee Pannu as Rashmi Chibber aka Rashmi Rocket, an Indian track and field athlete from Bhuj in Kutch, Gujarat. Competitor at the Indian National Open Athletics Championships, 2014 Asian Games and the 2016 South Asian Games qualifiers.
  - The character is based on several Indian sportswomen who were subject to gender testing due to being diagnosed with hyperandrogenism; such as Dutee Chand and Pinki Pramanik.
- Priyanshu Painyuli as Captain Gagan Thakur, Indian Army captain (later Major) and Rashmi's husband
- Abhishek Banerjee as Eeshit Mehta, Rashmi's lawyer
- Shweta Tripathi as Maya Bhasin
- Supriya Pathak as Bhanuben Chibber, Rashmi's mother
- Manoj Joshi as Ramnik Chibber, Rashmi's father, killed in the 2001 Bhuj earthquake
- Mantra as Coach Tejas Mukherji
- Supriya Pilgaonkar as Judge Savita Deshpande, judge at the Bombay High Court
- Miloni Jhonsa as Niharika Chopra, Dilip's daughter who's jealous of Rashmi
- Namita Dubey as Priyanka Kapoor
- Varun Badola as Dilip Chopra, Niharika's father and a Senior Selector
- Boloram Das as Coach
- Chirag Vora as Nileshbhai Virah Chibber
- Dharak Chhaya as Kartik Virah Chibber
- Dhwanish Chhaya as Paresh Virah Chibber
- Akash Khurana as Dr. Ejaz Qureshi
- Kshitee Jog as Dr. Mhatre
- Zafar Karachiwala as Mangesh Desai
- Aseem Jayadev Hattangady as Praveen Sood
- Umesh Jagtap as Inspector Jagan Sathe
- Akshay Taksale as Sub-Inspector Jagtap Rana
- Kritika Bharadwaj as Vaidehi Thakur

== Production ==
The principal photography began in November 2020 at FLAME University in Pune. The film was wrapped up on 26 January 2021 in Gujarat. Shooting locations included Bhuj and the Rann of Kutch in Gujarat as well as Ranchi in Jharkhand.

== Soundtrack ==
Rashmi Rocket

Soundtrack album by Amit Trivedi
- Released: 28 September 2021
- Recorded: 2021
- Genre: Feature film soundtrack
- Length: 15:07
- Language: Hindi
- Label: Zee Music Company

Amit Trivedi chronology
Haseen Dillruba (2021)	Rashmi Rocket (2021)	Maidaan (2022)

Official audio
- Rashmi Rocket - Full Album on YouTube

The film's music was composed by Amit Trivedi while lyrics written by Kausar Munir.

Track listing
No.	Title	Singer(s)	Length
1.	"Ghani Cool Chori"	Bhoomi Trivedi	3:35
2.	"Zidd"	Nikhita Gandhi	4:08
3.	"Rann Ma Kutchh"	Swaroop Khan, Mooralala Marwada	3:47
4.	"Zindagi Tere Naam"	Amit Trivedi	3:37
Total length:			15:07

== Critical reception ==
On the review aggregator website Rotten Tomatoes, 44% of 9 critics' reviews are positive, with an average rating of 4.8/10.

Anna M. M. Vetticad of Firstpost said “Here for a change is a Hindi film that knows how to portray male allies without allowing them to cross the line into male saviour territory. Here for a change is a Hindi film featuring female adversaries sans the all-women-are-enemies-of-women stereotype, and spotting female allies in unexpected places.”

Writing for Scroll, Nandini Ramnath said, “Light on its feet and often as fleet as Rashmi, the movie cruises along on the strength of several heart-warming scenes (many of them involving Rashmi’s tough-loving mother Bhanu), a foot-tapping folksy score by Amit Trivedi, and basic insights into the debate over hyperandrogenism that continues to rage in all manner of sport.”

Ronak Kotecha of The Times of India gave the film four stars and said, “Nanda Periyasamy’s riveting story, Aniruddha Guha’s sharp screenplay and Akarsh Khurana’s able direction, holds your attention right from the beginning until the end, where the race for justice is played out in a court.” About lead actress Taapsee Pannu, the publication said, “Taapsee Pannu once again proves her mettle, embodying Rashmi’s persona, physically and mentally. Her effort to celebrate Rashmi’s victory and endure her pain, is as real as it gets and the actress doesn’t miss the beat when it comes to making us root for her character.”

Shubhra Gupta, in her review of the film in The Indian Express, wrote, "When you see Taapsee Pannu’s Rashmi fighting the good fight, for herself and for other athletes who have been done against in similar fashion, you want to cheer. For keeping sporting women on top, and for the very worthy cause."

In his review for Cinema Express, critic Avinash Ramachandran wrote, "It is brave of Taapsee to do a film where the battle against the system takes paramount importance, and rightly so."

Zee News said in its review that, "Akarsh Khurana's Rashmi Rocket has an unconventional storyline that can greatly contribute to conversations around gender equality."

In her review for Mashable, Sushri Saha wrote, "With strong performances led by Pannu and a well-written screenplay, the film does justice to the issues it raises and challenges."

Critic Shomini Sen, in her review for WIONews, wrote that Rashmi Rocket “is an important film. It treads on an unknown track and it shines because of its important message.”

== Accolades ==
Award	Date of the ceremony	Category	Recipients	Result	Ref.
67th Filmfare Awards	30 August 2022	Best Film	Ronnie Screwvala, Neha Anand, Pranjal Khandhdiya	Nominated	
67th Filmfare Awards	30 August 2022	Best Director	Akarsh Khurana	Nominated	
67th Filmfare Awards	30 August 2022	Best Actress	Taapsee Pannu	Nominated	
67th Filmfare Awards	30 August 2022	Best Supporting Actor	Abhishek Banerjee	Nominated	
67th Filmfare Awards	30 August 2022	Best Story	Nandha Periyasamy	Nominated	
67th Filmfare Awards	30 August 2022	Best Screenplay	Aniruddha Guha	Nominated	
67th Filmfare Awards	30 August 2022	Best Dialogue	Kanika Dhillon	Nominated	
67th Filmfare Awards	30 August 2022	Best Production Design	Durga Prasad Mahapatra	Nominated	
67th Filmfare Awards	30 August 2022	Best Cinematography	Neha Parti Matiyani	Nominated	
67th Filmfare Awards	30 August 2022	Best Costume Design	Rohit Chaturvedi	Nominated	
67th Filmfare Awards	30 August 2022	Best Editing	Anjay Sharma, Shweta Venkat Mathew	Nominated	
