= Monica, O My Darling (soundtrack) =

Soundtrack album by Achint Thakkar
- Released: 4 November 2022
- Genre: Feature film soundtrack
- Length: 19:34
- Label: Sony Music India
- Producer: Achint Thakkar

Singles from Monica, O My Darling
- 1. "Yeh Ek Zindagi" Released: 24 October 2022; 2. "Love You So Much (I Want To Kill You)" Released: 2 November 2022

Monica, O My Darling is the soundtrack to the 2022 comedy-drama film of the same name. The album was released on 4 November 2022 by Sony Music India, and featured six songs composed by Achint Thakkar, who also co-wrote two of the tracks, while Varun Grover penning the remainder of the songs. It was accompanied by two singles —"Yeh Ek Zindagi" and "Love You So Much (I Want To Kill You)" — released on 24 October and 2 November, respectively.

The film marked Thakkar's maiden Hindi film composition after his breakthrough on composing the original soundtrack for the critically-acclaimed television series Scam 1992 (2020), whose title theme had gained popularity among listeners. Thakkar created the soundtrack based on the 1970s Hindi film music and had listened to compositions of veteran Hindi musicians such as R. D. Burman, Shankar–Jaikishan as well as watching older Hindi films to study the music. The composition happened at the last minute, when the film was nearly ready, and orchestra singers were roped in for giving vocals to the songs, as they could essentially mimic veteran singers, such as Asha Bhosle, Lata Mangeshkar, Mohammed Rafi, among others.

The album was critically acclaimed, with praise towards Thakkar for his composition, the vintage musical landscape, as well as the choice of singers. The album was considered as "one of the best Bollywood soundtracks" in the recent times where Hindi film music lacking creativity and originality.

== Production ==
The film's musical landscape is inspired from the Hindi film music from the 1970s, that featured the likes of R. D. Burman, S. D. Burman, Shankar–Jaikishan, Laxmikant–Pyarelal and Kalyanji–Anandji, which was simply a "full-on old-school Bollywood subject". The goal is to create music appreciated by contemporary listeners. Hence, Thakkar wanted to study the music from that era, suggested by Bala which led him to watch old Hindi films to dissect how the music was made. Bala also recommended Thakkar to watch videos on YouTube to check how background score was recorded and used in the era. Thakkar called it as "a fun journey" as he was a fan of "vintage music". Thakkar said that Bala had created his own universe in the film and he tried to "fit inside the quirky, nostalgic, and funny world".

Much of the songs were composed at the last minute, with Varun Grover and Thakkar writing the Hindi and English lyrics. He also roped orchestra singers who tried to sound like contemporary singers, essentially mimicking the vintage Hindi film music.

== Composition ==
Before composing the song "Suno Jaane Ja", Bala wanted to use the track "Ek Haseena Thi" from Karz (1980), but could not license the song at the last minute, which resulted him to compose the former. The track was sung by Saud Khan, which Thakkar felt that his singing "replicated him of Mohammed Rafi". For the song "Yeh Ek Zindagi", Bala had suggested a lot of singers who could sing like Asha Bhosle and Lata Mangeshkar, and had narrowed down on Anupama Chakraborty Shrivastava to sing the song, to imitate Bhosle's vocals. He added that "The best part about them was that they didn't face any trouble with regards to the melody and pronunciation as they have been doing that for ages."

In the song "Farsh Pe Khade", Thakkar wanted to channelize S. D. Burman's work since he was a huge fan of the composer. It was initially intended to be the funeral song, where Jayant is falling of the building. Thakkar also had composed "Bye Bye Adios" for a montage where Jayant is running to catch the train back to his girlfriend. Vasan decided to interchange the songs in those sequences, with "Bye Bye Adios" as the funeral song and "Farsh Pe Khade" in the montage scene. Thakkar had to maintain the character for the soundtrack, that could not come in the present day, and should be used in the retro era. For the rest of the tracks, he did not want to break the character and wanted to feel authentic. "Love You So Much I Want To Kill You" is an English number, sung by Thakkar as it is "actually what was happening in the scene" which he decided to make it "a Goan folk number". According to Thakkar, the song was not planned to come in this way, but actually happened as the script demanded. He composed in a Konkani-style, like "how Usha Uthup used to sing songs back in the day". The track "Hills of Malabar" had a Beatlesque-style influence.

== Track listing ==
All music is composed by Achint Thakkar.

No.	Title	Lyrics	Singer	Length
1.	"Yeh Ek Zindagi"	Varun Grover	Mikey McCleary, Anupama Chakraborty Shrivastava	3:39
2.	"Love You So Much (I Want To Kill You)"	Achint Thakkar	Sarita Vaz	2:24
3.	"Suno Jaanejaan"	Varun Grover	Saud Khan	3:19
4.	"Bye Bye Adios"	Varun Grover	Anupama Chakraborty Shrivastava	3:39
5.	"Farsh Pe Khade"	Varun Grover	Sagnik Sen	2:58
6.	"Hills Of Malabar"	Achint Thakkar	Vivienne Pocha	3:35
Total length:				19:34

== Reception ==
Monica O My Darling's soundtrack received rave reviews from critics and listeners, being hailed as "the integral part of the storytelling". Lakshana A Palat of The Indian Express wrote "... while, the characters and storytelling are near perfection, it's the OST that fuels the madness in the film. It's got a personality of its own, just as kooky and eccentric—almost as if it is responsible for the antics of the cast. It's slam poetry, but just infinitely better, with a vintage 70-80's touch, almost deluding you into believing that it actually belong to a different era, till you hear the lyrics. The words echo and shriek the current predicament of the characters without overstating too much, and portray a range of emotions, from frazzled to lust. They're not intending to be profound and neither do you have to read between the lines. It's so out there, like the film itself." Writing for The Hindu, Anuj Kumar wrote "The compositions of Achint Thakkar have the jazzy flavour of R.D. Burman and the lyrics by Varun Grover provide a sense of human greed and the ephemeral nature of life in a fun way."

Aindrila Roy of India Currents said "Achint Thakkar's music is the cherry on top of this delicious sundae. The soundtrack, much like the film, is a tribute to the thrillers of the 70s Bollywood." Ratnalekha Mazumdar of Telegraph India said that the film's music "has a vibe of its own, instantly transporting us to a fun, wacky world". She further listed it as the second-best soundtracks for Hindi films in 2022, listed Monica, O My Darling in the second position, and said "the music of Vasan Bala's Monica, O My Darling is refreshing and the comedy it evokes makes it special. The six songs, all diverse yet similar in mood and sentiment, are penned by lyricist-writer-poet-stand-up comedian Varun Grover and Achint. The music whips up a fun world as well as pushes the narrative forward."

Anubhab Roy of A Humming Heart said Achint's work in the film is "one of anachronistic daring, insofar as it is an ode to retro sound, and culture. This Bombay Velvet-esque treatment to sound is however, expected when the film is kept in context. Indeed, the production process takes the laurels as the entire sound seems to be shimmered with a tonal hue reminiscent of the magic R.D. Burman and Lata Mangeshkar conceived in "Piya Tu Ab To Aja". That the sonic structure of the album evokes a sense of unity, is perhaps not exactly a good thing, when the concession to the needs of the project has been acknowledged and done with." Suchandra Bose of The Quint said "The music is composed by Achint Thakkar, who fabulously condenses elements of suspense and humour, in the songs, especially when placed together with the visuals." Sneha Bengani of CNBC TV18 said "Monica, O My Darling's soundtrack could be a thing of wonder, the kind our film industry has lately stopped believing in. Turns out, it is just that. Achint Thakkar wields magic with his music, deeply inspired by the golden retro era of Hindi cinema. It's zingy, it's sparkling; it elevates the script to a point where it levitates, and makes Monica, O My Darling a delectable experience." Rajkummar Rao and Huma Qureshi also praised Thakkar's work in the music and background score.

== Analysis ==
Aakshi Magazine, author and teacher at Ashoka University analysed the film in his column for The Indian Express, commented about the music, saying the music "is not just nostalgic, but also what it admires". She referenced "Dard Karaara" from Dum Laga Ke Haisha (2015), sung by Kumar Sanu and Sadhana Sargam attempting the style of 1990s Hindi film song, and that attempt being extended to the entire soundtrack of the film, in this case. She further reviewed the public reception on the songs, commenting to the sincere quality, she added: "Some commenters initially assumed these songs were cover versions of older 1980s-90s Hindi film songs because they sound so much like the music of that time period. YouTube nostalgics, always searching for confirmation of their dissatisfaction with the present, have found gold. The music reminds them of another time — a better time. It sounds exactly like it."
