= Vedang Raina =

Indian actor

- Born: 2 June 2000 (age 26); New Delhi, India
- Education: SVKM's NMIMS
- Occupations: Actor, singer
- Years active: 2023–present

Vedang Raina is an Indian actor who works in Hindi films. He made his acting debut as Reggie Mantle in Zoya Akhtar's musical teen film The Archies (2023), and has since starred in the action thriller Jigra (2024) as well as Imtiaz Ali's romantic drama Main Vaapas Aaunga (2026), his first box-office success.

== Early life ==
Vedang Raina was born on 2 June 2000 in New Delhi into a family of Kashmiri Pandits and grew up in Mumbai. His grandparents hailed from Rainawari in Srinagar and both of his parents were born in Delhi but continued to frequently visit relatives in Srinagar until the 1990s exodus of Kashmiri Hindus due to militant violence in the region. His father, Ayush Raina, is a businessman but had previously directed the film Horror Story. He completed his schooling from Jamnabai Narsee School in Juhu and subsequently completed his BBA (Bachelor of Business Administration) from Narsee Monjee Institute of Management Studies (SVKM's NMIMS) in Vile Parle.

Raina first became involved in performing while at college, appearing at festivals and other events. He had developed an interest in music several years earlier and learned to play the guitar before considering a career in acting. Towards the end of his studies, he began pursuing modelling and music professionally.

== Career ==
After modelling for several brands, Raina was scouted by Zoya Akhtar for The Archies in 2021. Raina claimed that he had not thought about acting professionally until that point. He was officially announced to be playing the role of Reggie Mantle in May 2022. It was released on Netflix in 2023. Udita Jhunjhunwala of Scroll.in wrote that he "brings the right amount of swag to the rakish Reggie". Raina starred alongside Alia Bhatt in Vasan Bala's action thriller Jigra (2024), in which he played the younger brother of Bhatt's character, who is imprisoned in South East Asia. WION's Kriti Tulsiani thought that Raina made the most of his minimal screen time but was ultimately overshadowed by Bhatt. However, she praised the chemistry between the two. It emerged as a box-office bomb.

In 2026, Raina and Sharvari starred in Imtiaz Ali's romantic drama Main Vaapas Aaunga as a young couple separated by the Partition of British India. He lent his vocals for the song "Maskara", which appears in the film. In a positive review of the film for The Hindu, Anuj Kumar felt that, despite an earnest attempt, Raina's performance "suffers from a disconnect in character continuity" as he is unable to "project the inherent gravitas or enigmatic charm" that Naseeruddin Shah brings to the character's older incarnation. It emerged as a sleeper hit.

== Filmography ==
=== Films ===
Key
†	Denotes films that have not yet been released

Year	Title	Role	Notes	Refs.
2023	The Archies	Reggie Mantle		
2024	Jigra	Ankur Anand		
2026	Main Vaapas Aaunga	Young Ishar Singh Grewal / "Keenu"		

== Discography ==
Year	Song	Album	Composer	Ref.
2023	"Everything Is Politics"	The Archies	Shankar–Ehsaan–Loy, Aditi "Dot" Saigal	
2024	"Phoolon Ka Taaro Ka"	Jigra	R. D. Burman, Achint Thakkar	
2024	"Jigra Title Track"	Jigra	Achint Thakkar	
2024	"Jigra (Acoustic Version)"	Jigra	Achint Thakkar	
2026	"Maskara"	Main Vaapas Aaunga	A. R. Rahman	

== Awards and nominations ==
Year	Award	Category	Work	Result	Ref.
2024	Filmfare OTT Awards	Best Debut in a Film (Male)	The Archies	Won	
