= Bandish Bandits =

Indian television series

- Promotional poster
- Genre: Romance drama Musical
- Created by: Amritpal Singh Bindra; Anand Tiwari
- Screenplay by: Amritpal Singh Bindra
- Story by: Amritpal Singh Bindra; Lara Chandni; Anand Tiwari
- Directed by: Anand Tiwari
- Starring: Ritwik Bhowmik; Shreya Chaudhry; Naseeruddin Shah; Atul Kulkarni; Sheeba Chaddha; Rajesh Tailang; Amit Mistry; Kunaal Roy Kapur; Rahul Kumar; Tridha Choudhary
- Music by: Shankar–Ehsaan–Loy(Season 1); Akashdeep Sengupta (Season 2)
- Country of origin: India
- Original language: Hindi
- No. of seasons: 2
- No. of episodes: 18

Production
- Executive producer: Pranati Nagarsheth
- Cinematography: Sriram Ganapathy
- Editor: Ajay Sharma
- Running time: 33-50 mins
- Production companies: Still and Still Moving Pictures

Original release
- Network: Amazon Prime Video
- Release: 4 August 2020 – 13 December 2024

Bandish Bandits is an Indian musical romantic drama television series on Amazon Prime Video created by Amritpal Singh Bindra and Anand Tiwari, produced by Still & Still Moving Pictures and directed by Anand Tiwari. The script was written by Bindra, Tiwari and Lara Chandni. The series features debutants Ritwik Bhowmik as Radhe Rathod, a Hindustani Classical musician and Shreya Chaudhry as Tamanna Sharma, a pop singer, who hail from different worlds of music. Exploring the debate of music being a discipline versus a means of liberation. The series also features Naseeruddin Shah, Sheeba Chaddha and Atul Kulkarni.

The series was officially announced in February 2019, and principal photography took place across Jodhpur and Bikaner in Rajasthan. The first season's soundtrack album and background score is composed by Shankar–Ehsaan–Loy, in their debut for scoring music for a streaming series, and the soundtrack album received positive reviews from critics.

Bandish Bandits released on 4 August 2020, through Amazon Prime Video. The series received a positive response from critics and audiences, praising the performances of the cast, writing and direction, songs and background score. It was listed by critics as one of the best Indian television shows of 2020. The series was nominated for seven Filmfare OTT Awards, including Best Supporting Actor for Shah, Best Supporting Actress for Chaddha and Best Original Story and Best Screenplay. In September 2020, it was officially renewed for a second season. On 23 December 2022 Amazon Prime Video tweeted that the production of second season has begun. On May 19, 2023, Ritwik Bhowmik posted on his Instagram story (where he tagged Anand Tiwari) that they were in the "last few days" of production. Since then, Ritwik Bhowmik has posted on his Instagram story that Season 2 is "imminent."

On 8 November 2024, Amazon Prime Video launched a recap video of the first season, and announced that the second season would be released soon. The second season released on 13 December 2024.

== Cast ==
=== Season 1 ===
- Ritwik Bhowmik as Radhe Rathod aka Radhemohan Rathod Jr.
- Shreya Chaudhry as Tamanna Sharma
- Naseeruddin Shah as Pandit Radhemohan Rathod, the current Sangeet Samrat and Radhe's grandfather
- Atul Kulkarni as Digvijay Rathod, Radhe's half-uncle, Pandit Radhemohan's abandoned son, Rajendra's half-brother and Mohini's former love interest
- Sheeba Chaddha as Mohini Rathod, Radhe's mother and Digvijay's former love interest
- Rajesh Tailang as Rajendra Rathod, Radhe's father and Digvijay's half-brother
- Amit Mistry as Devendra Rathod, Radhe's uncle, Rajendra's younger brother and Digvijay's half-brother
- Kunaal Roy Kapur as Arghya
- Rahul Kumar as Kabir
- Rituraj Singh as Harshvardhan Sharma, Tamanna's father
- Meghna Malik as Avantika Sachdeva Sharma, Tamanna's separated mother
- Tridha Choudhury as Sandhya Shekhawat, Radhe's brief fiancée
- Harssh A. Singh as Suryasen Shekhawat, Sandhya's father
- Dilip Shankar as Rajaji
- Avneet Kaur, Rohan Shah, Gajraj Rao, Shweta Tripathi, Chaitanya Sharma and Harleen Sethi in the song Chedkhaniyaan

=== Season 2 ===
- Ritwik Bhowmik as Radhe Rathod aka Radhemohan Rathod Jr.
- Shreya Chaudhry as Tamanna Sharma
- Atul Kulkarni as Digvijay Rathod, Radhe's half-uncle, Pandit Radhe Mohan's abandoned son (from Pandit ji's first marriage), Rajendra's half-brother and Mohini's former love interest
- Sheeba Chaddha as Mohini Rathod, Radhe's mother, Rajendra's wife and Digvijay's former love interest
- Rajesh Tailang as Rajendra Rathod, Radhe's father, Mohini's husband and Digvijay's half-brother
- Saurabh Nayyar as Devendra Rathod, Radhe's uncle
- Kunaal Roy Kapur as Arghya
- Rahul Kumar as Kabir, Radhe's friend
- Divya Dutta as Nandini Singh, Tamanna's music teacher at RHMS
- Rohan Gurbaxani as Ayaan, Tamanna's RHMS senior, bandmate and love interest
- Yashaswini Dayama as Soumya, Tamanna's roommate, bandmate at RHMS
- Paresh Pahuja as Mahi
- Meghna Malik as Avantika, Tamanna's mother
- Suyash Tilak as Kailash Mandrekar
- Aaliyah Qureishi as Ananya "Jhalli", Radhe's bandmate
- Karan Chitra Deshmukh as KCD
- Anish Bhagat as Kingshuk, Tamanna's bandmate
- Arjun Rampal as Imroz Dehalvi, Nandini's ex-boyfriend (special appearance)
- Chavi Sodhani as female judge of Indian Band Competition

== Episodes ==
Season	Episodes	Originally released
1	10	August 2, 2020
2	8	December 13, 2024

=== Season 1 ===
No. overall	No. in season	Title	Directed by	Written by	Original release date
1	1	"Blue Bandit"	Anand Tiwari	Amritpal Singh Bindra	4 August 2020
Radhe is an Indian classical music prodigy from the Rathore Gharana in Jodhpur training under his grandfather, Panditji. During one class, he attempts to sing a high note without using falsetto, but fails. Frustrated, he skips breakfast to practice on the roof. His father informs him that the family is suffering financially as the Panditji's pension stopped coming a few months prior, and that he must get a job. He’s also told that despite his father being one of seven to ever receive the Ganda Bandan, a sacred thread awarded to the most talented singers in the Gharana, he was not made the successor of the Gharana. Meanwhile, Tamanna is a pop singer whose most recent song ‘Yolo Jeelo’ has flopped. Desperate for inspiration, she goes to her childhood home in Jodhpur, asking her agent to buy her two weeks while she writes a new hit. With the threat of losing her contract and missing out on her dream of singing with Queen Eli, an international superstar, she organises a concert which attracts a large crowd. Radhe, having gotten a job, is encouraged by his friend Kabir, who is organising the concert for Tamanna, to attend. He is entranced by her performance and decides to meet her after the show. Radhe meets Tamanna and her friend Paddu, who mock him for singing classical music and its customs. Angered, he performs the song he had sung in class, and hits the high notes with ease. Tamanna is shocked by his talent and records him singing. Elated by his success, he rushes home to perform for his Panditji. Later that week, the Rathore family organise the Sangeet Samrat showcase, an accolade which Panditji has been presented with numerous times. Tamanna comes and teases Radhe for his shyness and praises his performance, encouraging him to sing on his own. Radhe refuses, saying that it is not the done thing. His grandfather performs in front of the King. After the showcase, Radhe is again cornered by Tamanna, who praises him and tells him to sing with her. Panditji introduces Radhe to the King and announces that the following morning, he will perform the Ganda Bandan ceremony, and give up his job.
2	2	"Shuddhikaran"	Anand Tiwari	Amritpal Singh Bindra	4 August 2020
Following the showcase, the Rathore’s family car breaks down, leaving Panditji, his father, Radhe and the driver stranded on the highway. His father gets out to walk, while Panditji and the driver catches a lift home, leaving Radhe to wait for the mechanic. Tamanna passes him waiting in the car, and fixes up the engine so it restarts, insisting that she drive. She mocks him, speeding in the car and saying that she’s drunk and doesn’t hold a licence. The car breaks down once again, and they are put in prison for the night for speeding. Angered by Tamanna’s actions, as they could cause him to miss the Ganda Bandan ceremony, he sells out Kabir, who the police had been wanting to arrest for organising the concert for Tamanna, as it had caused a lot of problems for them. In exchange, he and Tamanna are released. Radhe dashes home, but is late for the ceremony by ten minutes, causing his grandfather to suspend the ceremony. Distraught, he begs his mother to ask Panditji to give him another chance but she refuses. Tamanna apologises to Radhe for causing him to miss his ceremony and shows him the mashup he made of his voice, and asking him whether he would want to join her on her new song. Angered, he snaps at her and accuses her of not dedicating her life to music, so not understanding his crisis. She tells him to not judge her before he knows her and leaves. Having already sent the sample track to her record label, who love it, Tamanna holds auditions to find another replacement for Radhe, with little success, and she decides to move back to Mumbai. Devendra finds Radhe distraught, and informs him that he was the eighth member to receive the Ganda Bandan before it was taken away from him as he wanted to run away with his true love, a French woman. To redeem himself, he was told he must perform a purification ritual to prove his dedication. Desperate, Radhe asks Panditji to let him undertake the purification ritual to receive the Ganda Bandan. Panditji warns him that it is very trying and that only three have ever succeeded; if he fails he must give up music and the family. The ritual asks that Radhe live in an abandoned jail, with little material possessions. He is only allowed to sing but otherwise he cannot speak to anyone, and that he must beg for alms. He must practice in order to be able to perform continuously for 21 hours. He trains hard, nearly starving himself. While begging for food, Tamanna comes across him, and offers him a presigning check of 2,00,000, but he declines. He witnesses his father being roughed up by a gang of bank enforcers as he’s not been paying. Radhe preps and returns, having completed the training and is ready to perform for the 21 hours. His uncle and mother advise him to pace himself, drink water and how to split the breaks so he doesn’t tire during the 21 hours. Radhe successfully completes the ritual, and receives the Ganda Bandan.
3	3	"Roleplay"	Anand Tiwari	Amritpal Singh Bindra	4 August 2020
Radhe approaches Tamanna after seeing his father get roughed up by the bank enforcers and agrees to sing with her. He asks that she doesn’t write the cheques in his name, but in Panditji’s - he does not want his father and grandfather to know that he has been singing outside the Gharana as it is forbidden. She agrees and they begin to work together on a song. Tamanna asks him to tap in to his emotions as it’s a love song, but Radhe reveals he has never been in love and never kissed a girl. Shocked, Tamanna suggests that they roleplay playing boyfriend and girlfriend. Radhe agrees, and Tamanna invites him to come along to Paddu’s wedding as practice. Radhe says that he cannot leave Jodhpur as he has hours of practice with Panditji. Meanwhile, Radhe practices daily with Panditji, who introduces him to a love song that he wrote for his wife, who he has not taught to anyone. Similarly, he asks Radhe to sing with more emotion, but Radhe asks whether he has to experience love to sing about it. Panditji says no, as it’s the responsibility of artists to portray emotions that they haven’t felt. In the afternoon, the family is invited to the palace. Radhe is introduced to Sandhya, the King’s niece, who has studied abroad. Their meeting is awkward, and they’re both obviously uncomfortable. Sandhya sings for Panditji, performing a rendition of a song he sung two years prior. Impressed, he announces that the two of them will be married, which upsets Radhe. Radhe accuses Panditji and his father of orchestrating the marriage just for the money; Panditji assures Radhe that they will not accept money from Sandhya’s family. Radhe manages to trick Panditji in to letting him attend the wedding by saying it’s for Kabir’s sister. On the way to the wedding, Tamanna asks Radhe to flirt with her. Shyly, he mentions that he doesn’t know how, and would not want to comment on her beauty as there were so many other things to say about her, causing her to blush. They arrive at the wedding and she encourages him to meet her friends. He becomes bolder, flirting and praising her in front of her friends. She goes to dance with her ex-boyfriend in an attempt to make him jealous saying ‘the makeup after an argument is amazing’. Unbothered, he sits on the side, and waits for her to return. She does, and he mocks her, before asking her to return on the dance floor and they share a kiss. The following day, he is able to sing with the emotion required for Panditji’s romantic song. Panditji says that he still needs to improve his technique, now he has the emotion.
4	4	"Phas Gaye"	Anand Tiwari	Amritpal Singh Bindra	4 August 2020
Confused by their kiss, Radhe seeks clarity from Tamanna, only to find her frustrated by the song writing process and throwing out the idea for the previous song. Determined, Radhe comes up with new lyrics for the romantic song, which Tamanna loves. Meanwhile, Sandhya and her family come for dinner, where Radhe is closed off. Radhe decides to invite Sandhya to the nearby carnival, where he falsely tells her that he is bipolar in an attempt to get her to cancel the wedding, but instead she promises to work through it with him. The royal family also begin supporting the Rathore family, satisfying the bank manager. Radhe continues formal training under Panditji, whose advice consistently conflicts with the direction from Tamanna while recording the song. Tamanna insists that he sing in falsetto; Radhe refuses, stating that it’s forbidden by Panditji. Tamanna accuses him of making an egotistical choice. Radhe explains the conflicts he’s being experiencing, but that he likes being around her and how much their kiss meant to him. They have sex for the first time, after which, Radhe records the falsetto. Sandhya and Radhe go saree shopping together, where Sandhya informs him that she knows that he is not bipolar and that he doesn’t want to marry her. Radhe tells her that he has a girlfriend who he loves and so she should break the marriage. Sandhya tells him that she will not, and that he’s free to do whatever he wants when they are married, but she will play the role of a good wife. The family hold an event to celebrate Makara Sankranti, where the king and Sandhya are invited. Radhe is allowed by Panditji to perform for the first time. During the performance, he sings in falsetto to achieve the high notes, upsetting Panditji. After the performance, the king applauds him as a worthy descendant of Panditji and formally announces the engagement of Radhe and Sandhya. Tamanna hears the announcement and takes off from the event, upset.
5	5	"Masked Man"	Anand Tiwari	Amritpal Singh Bindra	4 August 2020
Radhe runs after Tamanna, attempting to explain the announcement. She rebuffs him, upset that he cheated and tells him that they only have a professional relationship. He goes home, only to be scolded by Panditji for singing in falsetto, saying that he was distracted by the audience. Mid-reprimand, Digvijay, Panditji’s son shows up and challenges Panditji for the title of Sangeet Samrat, criticising him for abandoning him and his mother, and not upholding the honour of the Bikaner family. Radhe, confused, asks his mother what happened. His mother explains that Panditji was married to Uma, Digvijay’s mother, and was given the title of successor from his father. While in Jodhpur to sing, he met Radhe’s grandmother, taking her as a second wife, and establishing his family in Jodhpur. When Digvijay was 10, he came and joined the Gharana, but had a disagreement with Panditji and left. Since then they have not spoken to each other. Panditji begins practicing aggressively for the Sangeet Samrat, but midway through practice realises he is singing flat. He goes to the doctor to get this assessed. Mohini meets with Digvijay and expresses her worries, to which he offers to get him seen by a doctor in Delhi, which she declines. Radhe and Tamanna begin filming the music video in Rajastan. Radhe refuses to show his face, prompting him to wear a mask in the video. While filming, they lack chemistry, prompting them to discuss the engagement and Radhe offers to get replaced. Radhe gets engaged to Sandhya. Midway through the engagement, Kabir recognises the tattoo on Sandhya’s back from a previous sex tape he had seen. He threatens Sandhya to break off the engagement. She explains that her boyfriend in Brussels had recorded her without her knowledge, and shared the video widely. They part ways. Radhe returns to the video shoot, and informs Tamanna that his engagement has been broken off. They reunite and rekindle their relationship during the shooting. The results from Panditji’s audio testing come back, confirming that he has irreversible and progressive nerve damage in his ear, causing hearing loss. The doctor tells them that this could be resolved with a cochlear implant, but this is expensive and risky. The bank manager once again visits the house, as the payments from Sandhya’s family have stopped. He informs him that he has three months to come up with the money. Frustrated, Radhe’s father tells Panditji that the payments have stopped as they’ve been converted to scholarship money and that he must perform at a commercial event. At the event, Tamanna performs to an energetic and adoring crowds. Panditji then performs, and the crowd becomes disinterested and distracted, throwing him off. Digvijay is sat at the front of the audience, watching as Panditji gets more unsettled, eventually culminating in feedback which interrupts his performance and he realises he is unable to perform. Later that evening, Panditji informs Radhe that he will perform in his place for the Sangeet Samrat.
6	6	"A Star is Born"	Anand Tiwari	Amritpal Singh Bindra	4 August 2020
Panditji challenges Radhe to fuse the ragas Basant and Bahar to create a new fusion raga; these creations will help him beat Digvijay. Kabir gets Radhe tickets to Digvijay’s music school inauguration ceremony, where he demonstrates his musical prowess by fusing a classical orchestra with Carnatic music. Radhe gets intimidated. He attends the launch party for his first song with Tamann which is an instant hit upon its release. He is unable to enjoy the success as he is so worried about Sangeet Samrat, which he shares with Tamanna. Panditji keeps having dreams of Digvijay beating Radhe. Worried, he pushes Radhe to practice harder.
7	7	"#CoupleGoals"	Anand Tiwari	Amritpal Singh Bindra	4 August 2020
8	8	"Bandish Bandits"	Anand Tiwari	Amritpal Singh Bindra	4 August 2020
9	9	"A Separation"	Anand Tiwari	Amritpal Singh Bindra	4 August 2020
10	10	"Sangeet Samrat"	Anand Tiwari	Amritpal Singh Bindra	4 August 2020

=== Season 2 ===
No. overall	No. in season	Title	Directed by	Written by	Original release date
11	1	"Panditji"	Anand Tiwari	Amritpal Singh Bindra	13 December 2024
12	2	"Holding On"	Anand Tiwari	Amritpal Singh Bindra	13 December 2024
13	3	"The Voyager"	Anand Tiwari	Amritpal Singh Bindra	13 December 2024
14	4	"Bebaqiyaan"	Anand Tiwari	Amritpal Singh Bindra	13 December 2024
15	5	"Nirmohiya"	Anand Tiwari	Amritpal Singh Bindra	13 December 2024
16	6	"Hitchki"	Anand Tiwari	Amritpal Singh Bindra	13 December 2024
17	7	"Bandish Bandits"	Anand Tiwari	Amritpal Singh Bindra	13 December 2024
18	8	"Qarar"	Anand Tiwari	Amritpal Singh Bindra	13 December 2024

== Production ==
=== Development ===
On 14 February 2019, Vijay Subramaniam, chief director and head of content of Amazon Prime Video India, announced the release of six Indian originals, at the Television Critics Association's press tour held in Los Angeles, California. It was produced by Still and Still Moving Pictures, with the series created by Amritpal Singh Bindra and Anand Tiwari, who previously collaborated for Netflix film Love per Square Foot (2018), while Tiwari helmed the series. Bindra eventually stated that "The show is a millennial love story set against the backdrop of a clash between pop and Hindustani classical music. Based in Jodhpur, it explores the central theme of whether music is discipline or is it liberation." On 18 February 2019, the makers announced that Shankar–Ehsaan–Loy would compose music for the series, making their debut on a digital platform.

=== Characters ===
To play the lead characters Radhe and Tamanna, the makers hired debutants Ritwik Bhowmik and Shreya Chaudhary. Shreya opened up about what drew her to the script stating, "The script chose me. I was immediately sold when I came to know about the director and the cast. And things got even better when I read it. Tamannah is very different from Shreya, so that was exciting. Moreover, this is a romantic show woven around music and that aspect was very fresh for me." Ritwik eventually took no time to give his nod to the project, after revealing details about the director and cast. He further stated "There were 10 blueprints that I had to go through in order to get Radhe right. It took time to understand him as he is very far off from who I am in my life. It is about relationship dynamics, art versus exhibitionism, mediocrity versus genius among other things." The two actors were trained under musician Akshit Parikh, who also made a cameo in the series.

=== Filming ===
Principal photography began in December 2018. The series were primarily shot in Jodhpur and Bikaner in Rajasthan. From its very first episode, the series had captured several traditional Rajasthani elements which include traditional paintings, couches, walls, huts and palaces. The makers shot few scenes at the Lakshmi Vilas Palace located in Vadodara, and some of the scenes were shot at the deserts located in Bikaner district. In an interview with a media portal, actor Ritwik Bhowmik described his experience at the desserts of Bikaner. Bhowmik said that the team filmed one of the ragas in the Bikaner desert during the peak of summer. However, when the team was shooting the raga, it started to rain. Bhowmik said that this was "one of the most divine and magical experiences of his life". Shooting wrapped up in June 2019.

== Soundtrack ==
=== Season 1 ===
Bandish Bandits

Soundtrack album by Shankar–Ehsaan–Loy
- Released: 27 July 2020
- Recorded: 2019
- Genre: Amazon Original Series Soundtrack
- Length: 35:11
- Language: Hindi
- Label: Amazon Music

Shankar–Ehsaan–Loy chronology
Panga (2020)	Bandish Bandits (2020)	Bunty Aur Babli 2 (2021)
External audio
- Official Audio Jukebox on YouTube

The music for the first season ofBandish Bandits was composed by Shankar–Ehsaan–Loy, in their debut composition for a streaming series. On their inclusion, the composers stated that the background score will work in tandem to the story-line and building the scenes, the songs in this series form a part of the core narrative. The 11-song soundtrack album features lyrics by Divyanshu Malhotra, Tanishk S Nabar, Sameer Samant and also consists traditional verses. The soundtrack album was released on 27 July 2020, and received positive response from critics. Devarsi Ghosh of Scroll.in opined that "The blend of easy-listening pop and soaring semi-classical tunes brings to mind the trio's vast body of work". Baradwaj Rangan of Film Companion praised the album as a "magnificent east-meets-west soundtrack". Karthik Srinivasan of Milliblog hailed as "one of the best soundtracks in Hindi in recent times". Vipin Nair of Music Aloud reviewed as "a solid piece of work, despite noty being an extraordinary work by the trio (Shankar Mahadevan, Ehsaan Noorani and Loy Mendonsa), when it comes to classical fusion".

Track listing
No.	Title	Lyrics	Singer(s)	Length
1.	"Sajan Bin"	Divyanshu Malhotra	Shivam Mahadevan, Jonita Gandhi	3:14
2.	"Chedkhaniyaan"	Tanishk S Nabar	Shivam Mahadevan, Pratibha Singh Baghel	3:18
3.	"Couple Goals"	Tanishk S Nabar	Armaan Malik, Jonita Gandhi	2:36
4.	"Labb Par Aaye"	Sameer Samant	Javed Ali	3:47
5.	"Virah"	Sameer Samant	Shankar Mahadevan	3:00
6.	"Dhara Hogi"	Sameer Samant	Shankar Mahadevan	4:21
7.	"Garaj Garaj Jugalbandi"	Sameer Samant	Farid Hasan, Mohammed Aman	5:30
8.	"Mastiyaapa"	Tanishk S Nabar	Jonita Gandhi	3:22
9.	"Garaj Garaj"	Sameer Samant	Pandit Ajoy Chakraborty	2:38
10.	"Padharo Maare Des"	Traditional	Shankar Mahadevan	2:20
11.	"Bandish Bandits Theme"	Traditional	Shankar Mahadevan, Mame Khan, Ravi Mishra	1:05
12.	"Lat Uljhi Suljha Baalama"	Traditional	Shreeya Sondur	1:55
Total length:				35:11

== Release ==
On 15 July 2019, Amazon Prime Video announced the series officially, with a first look and teaser being released to coincide the Prime Day celebrations. The series was initially scheduled to release in the last quarter of 2019. However, the series was scheduled for a release date in late 2020. On 13 July 2020, the makers unveiled the first look motion poster of the series, followed by the teaser on 16 July, and the trailer on 20 July. As a part of the promotional strategy, the makers hosted a virtual music concert on 3 August 2020, with Shankar–Ehsaan–Loy, Prateek Kuhad, Lisa Mishra, Armaan Malik, Jonita Gandhi and Mame Khan, giving live performances. The series premiered on 4 August 2020 on Amazon Prime Video. On 11 December 2020, the makers released the Tamil and Telugu dubbed versions of the series.

On 21 November 2024, second season of Bandish Bandits was released on Amazon Prime Video.

== Reception ==
Shubhra Gupta of The Indian Express reviewed "The conversation around the need to revive interest in classical music, and the fact that there doesn't need to be a rift between the classical and the popular, needs to be on-going. Despite its flaws, Bandish Bandits keeps up focus on this crucial theme." Nandini Ramanath of Scroll.in reviewed "One thing which is missing from the mix is a reflection of the audience base for classical music that allows performers to maintain tradition, pursue long careers, and become stars in their own right. An understanding of the ability of classical musicians to successfully renegotiate the boundaries of form and performance on their own terms is also absent." Saibal Chatterjee of NDTV gave three out of five stars and reviewed "Watch Bandish Bandits for the music and the actors: they soar even when the show doesn't."

Pratishruti Ganguly of Firstpost gave three out of five stating "What Bandish Bandits fails to do, is meld its musical largesse with the narrative scope of the show. Predictably, the length of the show (10 episodes, each over 40 minutes) demands a complex storyline that slowly builds its dramatic tension to climax to a rousing crescendo." Saraswati Datar of The News Minute stated "It's no masterpiece but watch Bandish Bandits for the lovely music that we will not get to hear on any other show, and for some its fabulous actors who quite like the music only get seen on web series like these."

In contrast Mini Anthikkad Chibber of The Hindu reviewed "Bandish Bandits would have scraped through as a 90-minute vanilla rom-com. Padding up that wafer-thin story with inanities and songs is a terrible test of the viewer's patience." Rahul Desai of Film Companion reviewed "There are several problems with Bandish Bandits, but purely on a storytelling level, the writing suffers from attention deficit disorder."
