= Harssh A. Singh =

Indian actor and singer

Harssh Singh
- ਹਰਸ਼ ਸਿੰਘ
- Born: Ludhiana, Punjab
- Occupations: Radio jockey Actor director Voice over artist Singer
- Years active: 2012–present

Harssh Singh, also known as Harssh A. Singh is an Indian actor, singer, theatre personality and voice over artist. He was a Radio Jockey with Radio Mirchi (Mumbai), 98.3 fm, and was the winner of their first ever "RJ Hunt". He is known for his performance in Thappad (2020), Kabir Singh (2019), Raman Raghav 2.0 (2016) and in the Amazon Prime Video original series Bandish Bandits (2020) Directed by Anand Tiwari.

In April 2021, he joined the cast of Sony Entertainment Television show Kyun Utthe Dil Chhod Aaye (2021).

== Early life and career ==
Harssh was born on 23 September 1970, in Ludhiana, Punjab. He finished his schooling at the Sacred Heart Convent. He moved to Mumbai to be an actor and a singer, and during a chance audition bagged the post of Radio Jockey on Radio Mirchi.

He pursued theatre alongside, and has worked with personalities such as Alyque Padamsee, Jehan Manekshaw, Quasar Padamsee and Vikram Kapadia.

He has worked in several films, including Bajrangi Bhaijaan with Kabir Khan, Brothers with Karan Malhotra and Raman Raghav 2.0 with Anurag Kashyap, as well as Kabir Singh with Sandeep Vanga.

== Filmography ==
=== Films ===
Year	Title	Role
2014	The Persian (short)	Inspector Malhotra
2015	Parchhai (short)	Abhishek
2015	Bajrangi Bhaijaan	Shamsher Ali
2015	Brothers	Santosh Desai
2016	Adhuri Dhun (short)	Colonel Maria
2016	Raman Raghav 2.0	Sub Inspector
2016	Dangal	News hour Host
2017	The Good Girl (short)	Aman
2017	Tu Hai Mera Sunday	Shiamak Irani
2018	Ibadat (short)	Taj
2019	Kabir Singh	Kabir's lawyer
2020	Thappad	Rajhans (Vikram's boss)
2020	My Sun Sets To Rise Again (short)	Rajan
2021	State of Siege: Temple Attack	Harilal
2023	Pippa	Harsh Singh
2024	The Mehta Boys	Sam Makhija
2024	Jigra	Jaswant
2024	Chandu Champion	Brigadier Roy

=== As director ===
- Grand Plan (2017) – Short Film

=== Television ===
- Sense8 (2015)
- Bose: Dead or Alive (2017) as Ram Murthi
- Romil & Jugal (2017) as Jindal Kohli
- Ragini MMS: Returns (2017) as Principal Rajat Kapoor
- Bhak (2019) as Ramesh Nair
- Mission Over Mars (2019) as Ananth Vardhan
- Bandish Bandits (2020) as Suryasen
- Kyun Utthe Dil Chhod Aaye as Vijendra Pratapsingh (2021)
- Project 9191 (2021) as SK Raina
- Mumbai Diaries (2021) as Dr Farukh Romani
- Special Ops 1.5: The Himmat Story (2021) as Mahendra Chautala
- Family Dinner (2021) as Mr. Bhullar
- Illegal - Justice, Out of Order (2021)
- Bharat Nagar Diaries (2021-22) as Head Constable
- Guilty Minds (2022) as Shameen
- Avrodh: The Siege Within 2 (2022)
- Sultan of Delhi (2023) as Sanjana's father
- Rocket Boys Season 2 (2023) as Morarji Desai
- Hunter Tootega Nahi Todega (2023) as Dr Satish
- Hack (2023) as DRDO Chief
- Freedom At Midnight (2024) as Khizar
- Operation Safed Sagar (2026) as Group captain Arvind Oak

=== Theatre ===
- QTPs Project S.T.R.I.P (2012) as Captain Roy
- Jesus Christ Superstar (2015) as King Herod
- Gandhi (2016) – The Musical as Harilal

== Discography ==
- Never Be Friends (2020) – Single

== Awards ==
Year	Award	Category	Result
2013	Bharat Ratna Dr Ambedkar Award	Best Rj	Won
