= Shreya Chaudhry =

Indian actress and model

- Occupations: Actress; model
- Years active: 2017–present

Shreya Chaudhry is an Indian actress who primarily works in Hindi films. She made her acting debut with Dear Maya (2017). Chaudhry had since earned recognition with her role in Bandish Bandits (2020–2024) and The Mehta Boys (2025).

== Career ==
Chaudhry made her acting debut in 2017 with Dear Maya, playing a college student co-starring Manisha Koirala. Shubhra Gupta felt she "looks the part", but gets a little stilted. In 2018, she played a bride opposite Pavail Gulati in the short film The Other Way.

Chaudhry had her career breakthrough with her streaming debut Bandish Bandits. She played a pop singer opposite Ritwik Bhowmik. The two seasons released in 2020 and 2024 respectively. Saibal Chatterjee noted, "Shreya (along with Ritwik), do a fair job of conveying the range of emotions sparked by the twosome's quickly changing fortunes. The way they hold their own alongside the stalwarts in the cast is noteworthy." The series earned her nomination for Filmfare OTT Award for Best Actress in a Drama Series and won her the IIFA Digital Award for Best Actress – Web Series.

Chaudhry played an architecture in the 2025 film The Mehta Boys, opposite Avinash Tiwary. It follows a troubled father-son relationship. Abhimanyu Mathur noted, "Shreya is the film's moral compass. She brings confidence, panache, and sensitivity together."

== Filmography ==
Key
†	Denotes films that have not yet been released

=== Films ===
Year	Title	Role	Notes	Ref.
2017	Dear Maya	Ira		
2018	The Other Way	Rewa	Short film	
2025	The Mehta Boys	Zara		
2027	Mupapa †	TBA	Filming	

=== Web series ===
Year	Title	Role	Notes	Ref.
2020–2024	Bandish Bandits	Tamanna Sharma	2 seasons	

=== Music video appearances ===
Year	Album	Song's title	Singers	Ref.
2023	Tum Aaye Ho Toh	"Aisi Teri Yaadein"	Jubin Nautiyal	
2023	Tum Aaye Ho Toh	"Humko Tumse"	Jubin Nautiyal	
2023	Tum Aaye Ho Toh	"Udta Udta"	Jubin Nautiyal	
2023	Tum Aaye Ho Toh	"Tum Aaye Ho Toh"	Jubin Nautiyal	
2023	Tum Aaye Ho Toh	"Meri Sau"	Jubin Nautiyal	
2023	Tum Aaye Ho Toh	"Kahani Teri Meri"	Jubin Nautiyal	

== Awards and nominations ==
Year	Award	Category	Work	Result	Ref.
2023	Filmfare OTT Awards	Best Actress in a Drama Series	Bandish Bandits	Nominated	
2025	IIFA Digital Awards	Best Actress in a Leading Role – Web Series	Bandish Bandits	Won	
2025	Iconic Gold Awards	Best Actress Popular – Web	Bandish Bandits	Won	
2026	Screen Awards	Best Actress – OTT Film	The Mehta Boys	Nominated	
