= Rahul Kumar (actor) =

Indian actor

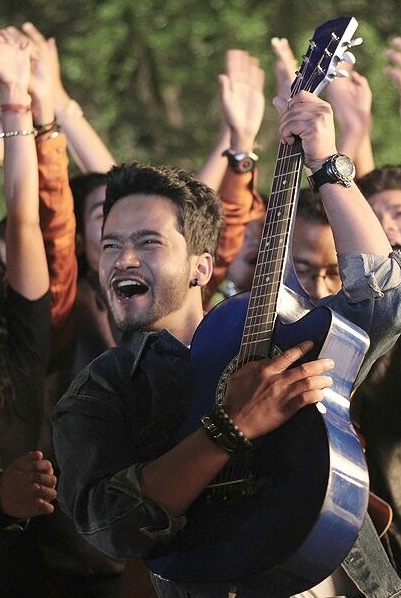
- Kumar in 2017
- Education: Rotary Public School, Gurgaon Sec-22
- Occupations: Actor; model; film director; singer
- Years active: 2005–present
- Known for: 3 Idiots (2009); Bandish Bandits (2020)
- Parents: Suresh Kumar (father); Geeta Devi (mother)

Rahul Kumar is an Indian actor, model, and singer working in the Bollywood industry. Active since 2010 through his theater projects, Bollywood films, television commercials and television shows, he is known for his performances in 3 Idiots (2009), and the 2020-web series Bandish Bandits.

== Career ==
Rahul began his theater career at the age of 3 and simultaneously acted in various child roles in Indian films like Omkara as Saif Ali Khan's son and The Blue Umbrella. Has also acted in Rajkumar Hirani's 3 Idiots and gained popularity from his character named Millimeter.

He has also done advertisements with actors Amitabh Bachchan, Shah Rukh Khan, Abhishek Bachchan, Ranbir Kapoor and R. Balki.

He portrayed the role of Kabir in the Amazon Prime web series named Bandish Bandits.

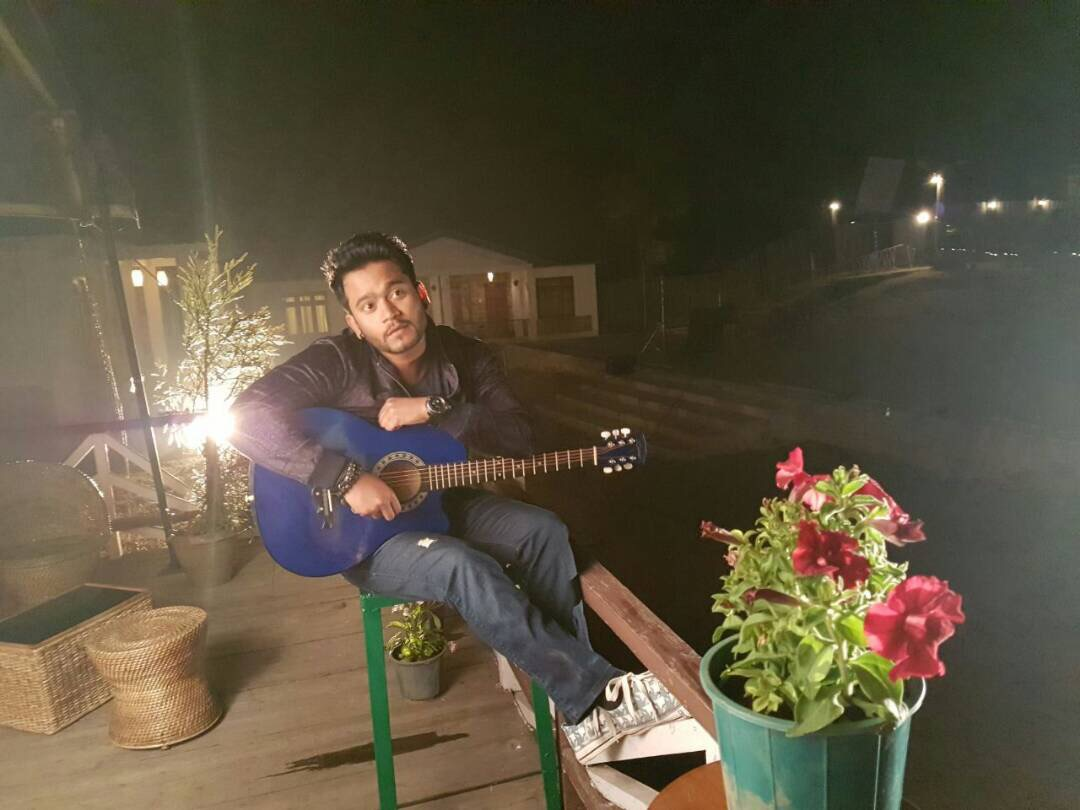
Rahul Kumar playing a guitar in 2018

== Filmography ==
Year	Title	Role	Notes
2005	The Blue Umbrella	Tikku	Debut
2006	Omkara	Golu	
2009	3 Idiots	Millimetre – MM	
2015	The Thief	Siddharth	Short film
2017	Brunie	Ishaan	
2017	Zoo	Messi	
2021	Sandeep Aur Pinky Faraar	Munna	

== Television ==
Year	Title	Role	Channel	Languages	Notes
2014–2015	Dharmaksetra	Sahadev	Epic	Hindi	Lead Role
2015	Phir Bhi Na Maane...Badtameez Dil	Tillu	Star Plus	Hindi	Supporting role
2015	Yam Hain Hum	Prabhu Reddy	SAB TV	Hindi (Tamil accent)	Episodic role
2015	Neeli Chatri Waale		Zee TV	Hindi	Episodic role

== Advertisements ==
YEAR	TITLE	LANGUAGE	NOTES
2010	Britannia Industries	HINDI	TVC
2010	Idea Cellular	HINDI	TVC
2010	Indian Premier League	HINDI	TVC
2012	Kaun Banega Crorepati	HINDI	TVC
2013	PepsiCo OH YES ABHI!	HINDI	TVC
2015	Zindagi (TV channel)	HINDI	PROMO SHOOT
2016	Swachh Bharat Abhiyan	HINDI	TVC
2016	Bharti Airtel	HINDI	TVC
2016	FreeCharge	HINDI	TVC
2017	ICICI Bank	HINDI	TVC
