= Sharvari =

Indian actress (born 1997)

- Sharvari in 2024
- Born: Sharvari Wagh; 14 June 1997 (age 29); Mumbai, Maharashtra, India
- Occupation: Actress
- Years active: 2020–present
- Relatives: Manohar Joshi (grandfather)

Sharvari Wagh (born 14 June 1997), known mononymously as Sharvari, is an Indian actress who works in Hindi films. She began her career as an assistant director for Luv Ranjan and Sanjay Leela Bhansali in 2015, before making her acting debut with Kabir Khan's war drama series The Forgotten Army - Azaadi Ke Liye (2020).

Sharvari ventured into films with Yash Raj Films's comedy Bunty Aur Babli 2 (2021), which won her the Filmfare Award for Best Female Debut. She achieved her breakthrough with the commercially successful comedy horror film Munjya in 2024 and has since starred in Imtiaz Ali's romantic drama Main Vaapas Aaunga (2026).

== Early life ==
She was born in a Marathi family on 14 June 1997. Her parents are Shailesh Wagh, a builder and Namrata Wagh, an architect. She studied at Mumbai's The Dadar Parsee Youths Assembly High School and Ruparel College. Manohar Joshi, former Chief Minister of Maharashtra, was her maternal grandfather.

== Career ==
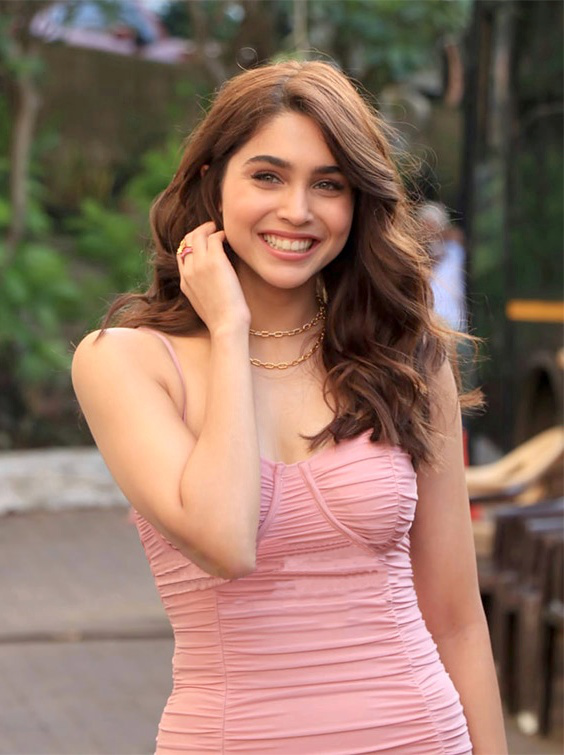
Sharvari in 2021

Sharvari worked as an assistant director in the movies Pyaar Ka Punchnama 2, Bajirao Mastani and Sonu Ke Titu Ki Sweety. She said she had been auditioning since 2014 for a leading roles in films. She made her acting debut with the 2020 Amazon Prime series The Forgotten Army - Azaadi Ke Liye opposite Sunny Kaushal.

Sharvari made her film debut alongside Rani Mukerji, Saif Ali Khan and Siddhant Chaturvedi in Yash Raj Films (YRF)'s crime comedy Bunty Aur Babli 2, which was released in 2021. Her performance earned her the Filmfare Award for Best Female Debut and IIFA Award for Star Debut of the Year – Female. Hindustan Times noted, "Sharvari is pretty confident for her first film and has a great screen presence." It did not perform well at the box-office. Her next release was three years later, in the comedy horror film Munjya in 2024. Inspired by the Maharashtrian folktale of munjya, the film served as an instalment of the Maddock Horror Comedy Universe. Upon the release of the film Sukanya Verma from Rediff opined, "Sharvari sticks to her brief -- beam in enthusiasm, scowl in prosthetics". Commercially, the film emerged as a sleeper hit and proved to be her break-out role. Sharvari had a brief role (billed as a special appearance) opposite debutante Junaid Khan in YRF's period drama Maharaj, a delayed production that was released on Netflix. In her third release of the year, Sharvari played the title role of a Dalit woman in the action drama Vedaa, co-starring John Abraham. In a mixed review of the film, Nandini Ramnath of Scroll.in took note of how well she "channel[led] her heroine’s fighting spirit". It emerged as a box-office bomb, which The Times of India attributed to its release alongside Stree 2.

In 2026, Sharvari starred opposite Vedang Raina in Imtiaz Ali's romantic drama Main Vaapas Aaunga. It tells the story of a young couple in Punjab who are separated by the 1947 Partition of India. In a positive review for The Telegraph, Agnivo Niyogi praised Sharvari as an "appealing performer" who "brings considerable grace" to her role, but noted that her chemistry with Raina "never quite reaches the intensity that the narrative demands". Main Vaapas Aaunga also emerged as a sleeper hit. She later joined the YRF Spy Universe with Alia Bhatt in Alpha, in which the duo played genetically enhanced super-soldiers who go rogue. Critics generally found Sharvari to rise above an underwritten role that is largely sidelined by Bhatt, and praised her performance in the action sequences. However, Vineeta Kumar of India Today was critical of the actress' reduction to a "sexualised doll throughout the film [which] becomes impossible to ignore". The film was lowest-grossing of the franchise and had poor box-office returns. She will next star in two romances, Sooraj Barjatya's Yeh Prem Mol Liya opposite Ayushmann Khurrana and Ali Abbas Zafar's Beparwah with Ahaan Panday.

== Filmography ==
Key
| † | Denotes films that have not yet been released |

=== Films ===
| Year | Title | Role | Notes | Ref. |
|---|---|---|---|---|
| 2015 | Pyaar Ka Punchnama 2 | —N/a | Assistant director | |
| 2015 | Bajirao Mastani | —N/a | Assistant director | |
| 2018 | Sonu Ke Titu Ki Sweety | —N/a | Assistant director | |
| 2021 | Bunty Aur Babli 2 | Sonia Rawat (Babli) | Acting debut film | |
| 2024 | Munjya | Bela | | |
| 2024 | Maharaj | Viraaj | Special appearance | |
| 2024 | Vedaa | Vedaa Berwa | | |
| 2026 | Main Vaapas Aaunga | Jiya (Afsana) | | |
| 2026 | Alpha | Durga Kaul | | |
| 2026 | Yeh Prem Mol Liya † | Purva | Post-production | |
| 2027 | Beparwah † | TBA | Post-production | |

=== Television ===
| Year | Title | Role | Notes | Ref. |
|---|---|---|---|---|
| 2020 | The Forgotten Army – Azaadi Ke Liye | Maya Srinivasan | | |
| 2026 | India's Got Latent | Guest judge | Season 2, Episode 1 | |

== Awards and nominations ==
| Year | Award | Category | Work | Result | Ref. |
|---|---|---|---|---|---|
| 2022 | International Indian Film Academy Awards | Star Debut of the Year – Female | Bunty Aur Babli 2 | Won | |
| 2022 | Filmfare Awards | Best Female Debut | Bunty Aur Babli 2 | Won | |
| 2022 | Pinkvilla Screen and Style Icons Awards | Stylish Emerging Talent – Female | —N/a | Nominated | |
| 2025 | Pinkvilla Screen and Style Icons Awards | Best Actress – Jury Choice | Munjya | Won | |
