= Monica, O My Darling =

2022 Indian neo-noir crime comedy film

- Official release poster
- Directed by: Vasan Bala
- Written by: Yogesh Chandekar; Vasan Bala
- Story by: Keigo Higashino
- Based on: Burutasu No Shinzou by Keigo Higashino
- Produced by: Sarita Patil; Sanjay Routray; Dikssha Jyote Routray; Vishal Bajaj; Kewal Garg; Anish Vikramaditya
- Starring: Rajkummar Rao; Radhika Apte; Huma Qureshi
- Cinematography: Swapnil S. Sonawane
- Edited by: Atanu Mukherjee
- Music by: Achint Thakkar
- Production company: Matchbox Shots
- Distributed by: Netflix
- Release date: 11 November 2022
- Running time: 129 minutes
- Country: India
- Language: Hindi

Monica, O My Darling is a 2022 Indian Hindi-language neo-noir dark comedy crime thriller film directed by Vasan Bala. The film stars Rajkummar Rao, Huma Qureshi and Radhika Apte. It is based on the 1989 Japanese detective novel Burutasu No Shinzou (transl. Heart of Brutus) by Keigo Higashino. The film's title is taken from the 1971 film Caravan's song "Piya Tu Ab To Aja". It released on 11 November 2022 on Netflix.

Upon release, Monica, O My Darling received positive reviews from critics.

At the 2023 Filmfare OTT Awards, Monica, O My Darling received 9 nominations, including Best Web Original Film, Best Director in a Web Original Film (Bala), Best Actor in a Web Original Film (Rao), Best Actress in a Web Original Film (Qureshi) and Best Supporting Actress in a Web Original Film (Apte), and won 4 awards, including Best Web Original Film and Best Actor in a Web Original Film (Critics (Rao).

== Plot ==
During a night shift at the Unicorn factory, Dev Prakash informs his friend Gaurav that he has proposed marriage to Shalu which she has accepted. Soon after, the company's robot attacks and kills Dev. The case is closed as an accident, while safety officer Faridi Baig is fired from the company.

Six months later, at the Unicorn's 50th anniversary, Jayant Arkhedkar is promoted to the board of directors for the company. He is also engaged to Nikki Adhikari, the daughter of Unicorn's CEO Satyanarayan Adhikari. After the ceremony, he is shown to be having an affair with the company's secretary, Monica Machado. Monica reveals to Jayant that she is pregnant with his child and tries to blackmail him. Later, Jayant receives a letter with photos of him and Monica, asking him to visit a hotel. In the hotel, he meets Arvind Manivannan, the CFO at Unicorn, and Nishikant Adhikari, the son of Satyanarayan and managing director of the company, both of whom also claim to have been blackmailed by Monica in the same way. The three of them devise a plan to murder Monica, with Nishikant killing her, Jayant transporting the body, and Arvind disposing of the corpse. Nishikant has them sign a contract as a failsafe in case Arvind and Jayant back out of the plan at the last moment. The plan appears to be on track until Arvind and Jayant encounter a leopard while trying to dump the body in the jungle, and have to flee.

The next day, Arvind and Jayant are shocked to see that Monica is still alive. Wildlife photographers discover a body disposed off in the wild, which turns out to be Nishikant's. ACP Naidu begins to investigate the death at Unicorn office, while both Arvind and Jayant suspect that Monica is the one who killed Nishikant. Arvind later receives a parcel at his home containing a venomous snake, which ends up killing him. Jayant receives a similar parcel but manages to escape, and receives a text with a photo of their contract. Jayant follows the instructions and goes to the roof to retrieve the contract but he is pushed from behind by Gaurav (Jayant's friend and fiancé of Jayant's sister Shalu). Jayant survives and manages to get the contract, only to discover that it is a photocopy. Jayant believes Monica is behind the deaths of Nishikant and Arvind and the attempts on his life. He visits Monica's house where he tries to kill her, but his conscience stops him. Monica tells him that she didn't kill Nishikant or Arvind or attempt to kill Jayant, and seems to have figured out who the murderer is. Before she can tell Jayant, she dies from snake venom that had been mixed into her wine.

Later, Jayant discovers that the internal investigation into Dev's death blamed Jayant's faulty robot technology, but Satyanarayan covered it up and had security officer Faridi fired instead. When Jayant meets Faridi to apologise, Faridi insists that Dev wasn't killed by accident, but was rather murdered by a manual override of the robot's controls. Jayant reveals this to Shalu, and Jayant and Gaurav together go to the Unicorn factory to check the manual access logs of the robot that killed Dev. Jayant discovers that it was Gaurav who killed Dev, as he was in love with Shalu. Gaurav attacks Jayant with the same robot. During the fight, Gaurav confesses to killing Nishikant and Arvind, but not Monica. Nishikant saw Dev's murder by Gaurav and started using Gaurav as his minion. But when Nishikant began blackmailing Gaurav to murder Monica, he snapped and murdered Nishikant. Subsequently, he set out to clean house including killing Jayant.

After some struggle, Jayant is finally able to take control of the robot with his watch and kills Gaurav in self-defense. He tells Shalu and the police that Gaurav was behind the murders of Dev, Nishikant, Arvind, and Monica. But ACP Naidu playfully tells him that Monica's murder was not by Gaurav but by someone else. Later, Naidu announces at a press conference that Monica's killer was Tamang Rana, who was the father of her unborn child, and that he had committed suicide due to the guilt he felt for Monica's murder.

During the prayer meet for Monica, Naidu reveals to Jayant that Monica was actually carrying Satyanarayan's child. He had Tamang poison Monica's wine after she started blackmailing Satyanarayan, and then had Naidu murder Tamang to silence him. Jayant later goes to Gaurav's house to retrieve the original contract, and is relieved to find it in a cupboard. As soon as he finishes burning it, he is surrounded by the snakes which Gaurav had stolen, and the screen turns to black leaving his fate unknown.

== Cast ==
- Rajkummar Rao as Jayant "Jay" Arkhedkar aka Johnny
- Huma Qureshi as Monica Machado
- Radhika Apte as ACP V. Naidu
- Sikandar Kher as Nishikant Adhikari
- Akansha Ranjan Kapoor as Nikki Adhikari
- Bagavathi Perumal as Arvind Manivannan
- Vijay Kenkare as Satyanarayan Adhikari
- Sukant Goel as Gaurav More
- Zayn Marie Khan as Shalu Vartak
- Shiva Rindani as Tamang Rana
- Shiv Chauhan as Dev Prakash
- Faisal Rashid as Faridi Baig
- Radhika Madan as Supri (Guest appearance)
- Abhimanyu Dassani as Surya (Guest appearance)

== Soundtrack ==
The first song in this film is titled "Yeh Ek Zindagi" sung by Anupama Chakraborty Shrivastava, composed by Achint Thakkar and Mikey McCleary and lyrics by Varun Grover. Released on 1 November 2022.

The album also features songs like "Suno Janejaan", "Farsh Pe Khade", "Hills Of Malabar" and "I Love You So Much" which are sung by Saud Khan, Sagnik Sen, Vivienne Pocha & Sarita Vaz respectively.

== Production ==
Production began in July 2021.

== Release ==
The film released on 11 November 2022 on Netflix.

== Reception ==
Monica, O My Darling received positive reviews from critics who praised the direction, writing, cast performances (particularly Rajkummar Rao, Huma Qureshi and Radhika Apte), cinematography, humour, background score, and homages to the vintage crime films in Hindi cinema. However, some critics were critical of the film's latter half.

"After a rigorous build up in the first half, the film nosedives after the interval with murders without any logic happening at a speed that's difficult to fathom."
— Monika Rawal Kukreja in The Hindustan Times

=== Critical reception ===
On the review aggregator website Rotten Tomatoes, 81% of 16 critics' reviews are positive, with an average rating of 6.3/10.

Zinia Bandyopadhyay of India Today rated the film 4 out of 5 stars and wrote "The frames of the film are beautiful. It will make you just pause and watch them again and again. And the background music heightens the impact that the narrative has. So long after the film has ended, it will still remain in your hearts". The Indian Express gave the film a positive response and declared "Relax, Bollywood is doing just fine; you're not looking in the right places". Saibal Chatterjee of NDTV rated the film 4 stars out of 5 and called it "An intriguing, enthralling work that deftly turns pulp into a precious cinematic pearl. In short, it is a not-to-be-missed marvel". Pratikshya Mishra of The Quint rated the film 3.5 stars out of 5 and wrote "In summary, Monica O My Darling is an intriguing story set in a delicious pulpy universe with a great cast. With a tighter edit and a more concise story, the film would've been almost impossible to put down (but even as it stands, it's a fun watch)".

== Accolades ==
Year	Award ceremony	Category	Nominee / work	Result	Ref.
2023	Filmfare OTT Awards	Best Web Original Film	Monica O My Darling	Nominated	
2023	Filmfare OTT Awards	Best Web Original Film (Critics)	Monica O My Darling	Won	
2023	Filmfare OTT Awards	Best Director in a Web Original Film	Vasan Bala	Nominated	
2023	Filmfare OTT Awards	Best Actor in a Web Original Film	Rajkummar Rao	Nominated	
2023	Filmfare OTT Awards	Best Actor in a Web Original Film (Critics)	Rajkummar Rao	Won	
2023	Filmfare OTT Awards	Best Actress in a Web Original Film	Huma Qureshi	Nominated	
2023	Filmfare OTT Awards	Best Supporting Actress in a Web Original Film	Radhika Apte	Nominated	
2023	Filmfare OTT Awards	Best Story (Web Original Film)	Yogesh Chandekar	Nominated	
2023	Filmfare OTT Awards	Best Background Music (Web Original Film)	Achint Thakkar	Won	
2023	Filmfare OTT Awards	Best Cinematographer (Web Original Film)	Swapnil Sonawane	Won	
2023	Filmfare OTT Awards	Best Sound Design (Web Original Film)	Kunal Sharma	Nominated	
