= Imtiaz Ali (director) =

Indian filmmaker (born 1971)

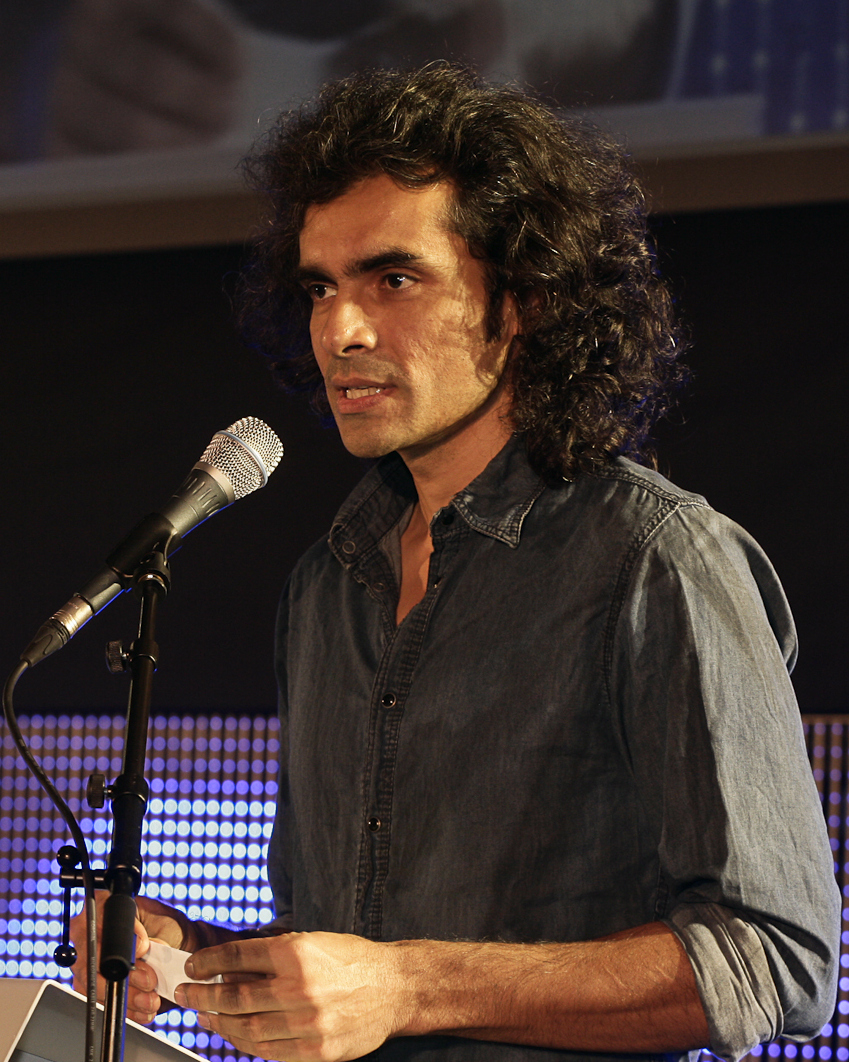
- Ali in 2012
- Born: 16 June 1971 (age 55); Jamshedpur, Bihar, India
- Occupations: Filmmaker; screenwriter
- Years active: 1994–Present
- Spouse: Preety Ali (m. 1995)
- Children: 1
- Relatives: Khalid Ahmed (uncle)

Imtiaz Ali (Hindustani pronunciation: [ɪmt̪ɪjɑːz əliː]; born 16 June 1971) is an Indian filmmaker. He is best known for writing and directing the romantic comedies Socha Na Tha (2005), Jab We Met (2007) and Love Aaj Kal (2009), and the dramas Rockstar (2011), Highway (2014), Tamasha (2015), Jab Harry Met Sejal (2017), Amar Singh Chamkila (2024), and Main Vaapas Aaunga (2026).

== Early and personal life ==
Imtiaz Ali was born in Jamshedpur and spent some of his early years in Patna.

His father Mansoor Ali was a contractor in irrigation, and as a child, he would sometimes accompany him, which gave Imtiaz a sense of what was going on in the innards of India. His maternal uncle is Pakistani TV actor and director/producer Khalid Ahmed. He had his early education at St. Michael's High School, Patna and later at D.B.M.S. English School, Jamshedpur. He is the elder brother of director Arif Ali, who made his directorial debut with Lekar Hum Deewana Dil (2014).

He attended Hindu College, University of Delhi, where he took part in college theater. He was very successful in college. He also started Ibtida, the dramatics society of the college. Thereafter, he moved to Mumbai and did a diploma course from Xavier Institute of Communication.

== Career ==
=== Initial struggles and directorial debut (1994–2006) ===
Ali began his career directing TV programs including Kurukshetra for Zee TV and Imtihaan for Doordarshan. His initial work also includes a forty-five-minute slot telefilm for the series Rishtey on Zee TV; he later made the story of one of the episodes into a feature film named Highway. He moved on to Bollywood films. In 2005, he made his directorial debut with the romantic comedy, Socha Na Tha, starring Abhay Deol and Ayesha Takia. He got to direct the film following a meeting with Sunny Deol, who agreed to review his script and produce the film. Reflecting on this pivotal moment, Ali remarked that, "he didn’t ask me where I was from or about my experience. He holds a significant place in my life because he gave me my first film." Upon release, it received positive reviews from the critics, but emerged as a commercial failure at the box office. He quoted, later in an interview, that it took him three years to make the film.

=== Success (2007–2015) ===
His second directorial venture, the romantic comedy Jab We Met starring Kareena Kapoor and Shahid Kapoor, emerged as a major critical and commercial success. The film earned him the Filmfare Award for Best Dialogue, in addition to his first nomination for the Filmfare Award for Best Director. It has been consistently ranked as one of the most popular romantic films of Bollywood.

His next film, the romantic comedy-drama Love Aaj Kal starring Saif Ali Khan and Deepika Padukone, emerged as his biggest commercial success to date. The film received widespread critical acclaim, earning Ali his second nomination for the Filmfare Award for Best Director. It has gone to achieve cult status, and has been acclaimed for its depiction of the feeling of pure love which never changes, although the perspective of realizing one's soulmate changes over time.

Ali's fourth directorial venture, the musical romantic drama Rockstar starring Ranbir Kapoor and Nargis Fakhri, also emerged as a major commercial success at the box office and received widespread critical acclaim with high praise for Ali's direction, Kapoor's performance and A. R. Rahman's music. The film earned him his third nomination for the Filmfare Award for Best Director. It has now achieved cult status, and also has been frequently ranked in the lists of most iconic musical romances of Bollywood.

Post Rockstar, Ali penned the story and screenplay for the romantic comedy-drama Cocktail (2012), directed by Homi Adajania, starring Deepika Padukone, Saif Ali Khan and Diana Penty in lead roles. The film received positive reviews from critics upon release, and emerged as a commercial success at the box office.

Ali founded his film production company, Window Seat Films in 2013, whose first release was the road drama Highway (2014). Starring Alia Bhatt and Randeep Hooda, the film was highly appreciated by critics upon release, and also emerged as a commercial success at the box office. The film has been widely credited as one of Bollywood's best films depicting mental disorders (in this case, Stockholm syndrome).

His next directorial venture, the coming-of-age romantic drama Tamasha (2015), starred Ranbir Kapoor and Deepika Padukone in lead roles. Despite major hype, the film emerged as a moderate commercial success, but received positive reviews with high praise for Kapoor's performance upon release; however, it has gone on to achieve cult status for its subject and has also been recognised as one of Ali's best films.

=== Commercial decline and resurgence (2017–present) ===
His next directorial, the romantic comedy Jab Harry Met Sejal starring Shah Rukh Khan and Anushka Sharma in lead roles, was released on 4 August 2017. The film released to mixed-to-negative reviews, and emerged as a commercial failure at the box office.

He then wrote the screenplay for his brother Sajid Ali's romance film Laila Majnu (2018), starring newcomers Avinash Tiwary and Tripti Dimri in lead roles. The film received mixed reviews upon release, and emerged as a commercial disaster at the box office.

After a gap of three years, his next directorial venture was the romantic drama Love Aaj Kal, starring Kartik Aaryan and Sara Ali Khan in lead roles. The film was the spiritual successor to Love Aaj Kal (2009), starring Saif Ali Khan and Deepika Padukone, also directed by Ali. The film, which released on 14 February 2020, received mixed-to-negative reviews from critics, and emerged as a commercial failure at the box office.

In his first film collaboration with Netflix, Ali directed Amar Singh Chamkila, a biopic on the assassinated Punjabi musician Amar Singh Chamkila, starring Diljit Dosanjh and Parineeti Chopra in the lead roles. It was released on 12 April 2024 to positive reviews from critics and audiences, alike. Many considered it to be a huge return to form for Ali. Ali is set to continue his partnership with Netflix through the upcoming romance series O Saathi Re, directed by his brother Arif Ali with Arjun Rampal in the lead role. For his next directorial, Main Vaapas Aaunga, released on 12 June 2026 in theaters, he reunited with Diljit Dosanjh and A. R. Rahman. It also stars an ensemble cast of Naseeruddin Shah, Sharvari, and Vedang Raina.

== Filmography ==
Key
†	Denotes films that have not yet been released

=== Films ===
Year	Title	Director	Producer	Writer	Notes
2005	Socha Na Tha	Yes		Yes	Also editor
2006	Ahista Ahista			Yes	
2007	Jab We Met	Yes		Yes	
2009	Love Aaj Kal	Yes		Yes	
2011	Rockstar	Yes		Yes	
2012	Cocktail			Yes	
2014	Highway	Yes	Yes	Yes	
2015	Tamasha	Yes		Yes	
2017	Jab Harry Met Sejal	Yes		Yes	
2017	Paani Panchayat		Yes	Yes	Short
2018	Laila Majnu		Yes	Yes	
2018	The Other Way	Yes	Yes	Yes	Short
2020	Love Aaj Kal	Yes	Yes	Yes	
2022	Thai Massage		Yes		
2024	Amar Singh Chamkila	Yes	Yes	Yes	
2024	My Melbourne	Yes			Anthology film; Creative director; Segment: "Jules"
2026	Main Vaapas Aaunga	Yes	Yes	Yes	

As actor

Year	Title	Role
2004	Black Friday	Yakub Memon
2025	Metro... In Dino	Himself

=== Television ===
Year	Title	Director	Producer	Writer	Creator	Notes
1994	Imtihaan	Yes				Unknown episodes
2020–2022	She		Yes	Yes	Yes	2 seasons; 14 episodes
2022	Dr. Arora		Yes	Yes	Yes	8 episodes

== Collaborators ==
Collaborator	Socha Na Tha (2005)	Jab We Met (2007)	Love Aaj Kal (2009)	Rockstar (2011)	Highway (2014)	Tamasha (2015)	Jab Harry Met Sejal (2017)	Love Aaj Kal (2020)	Amar Singh Chamkila (2024)	Main Vaapas Aaunga (2026)
Irshad Kamil	Yes	Yes	Yes	Yes	Yes	Yes	Yes	Yes	Yes	Yes
Aarti Bajaj		Yes	Yes	Yes	Yes	Yes	Yes	Yes	Yes	Yes
Mohit Chauhan		Yes	Yes	Yes		Yes	Yes	Yes	Yes	Yes
A. R. Rahman				Yes	Yes	Yes			Yes	Yes
Pritam		Yes	Yes				Yes	Yes		
Sandesh Shandilya	Yes	Yes								
Natty Subramaniam		Yes	Yes							
Deepika Padukone			Yes			Yes				
Anil Mehta				Yes	Yes					
Ranbir Kapoor				Yes		Yes				
Randeep Hooda					Yes			Yes		
Diljit Dosanjh									Yes	Yes
Sylvester Fonseca									Yes	Yes

== Awards and nominations ==
Below is a list of awards and nominations received by Imtiaz Ali.

=== Filmfare Awards ===
The Filmfare Awards are presented annually by The Times Group to honour both artistic and technical excellence of professionals in the Hindi cinema.

Year	Film	Category	Result	Ref.
2008	Jab We Met	Best Director	Nominated	
2008	Jab We Met	Best Dialogue	Won	
2010	Love Aaj Kal	Best Director	Nominated	
2010	Love Aaj Kal	Best Story	Nominated	
2010	Love Aaj Kal	Best Screenplay	Nominated	
2010	Love Aaj Kal	Best Dialogue	Nominated	
2012	Rockstar	Best Director	Nominated	
2015	Highway	Best Story	Nominated	

=== International Indian Film Academy Awards ===
The International Indian Film Academy Awards (shortened as IIFA) is an annual international event organised by the Wizcraft International Entertainment Pvt. Ltd. to honour excellence in the Hindi cinema.

Year	Film	Category	Result	Ref.
2008	Jab We Met	Best Director	Nominated	
2008	Jab We Met	Best Story	Nominated	
2008	Jab We Met	Best Dialogue	Won	
2010	Love Aaj Kal	Best Director	Nominated	
2010	Love Aaj Kal	Best Story	Nominated	
2012	Rockstar	Best Director	Nominated	
2012	Rockstar	Best Story	Nominated	
2015	Highway	Best Film	Nominated	
2015	Highway	Best Director	Nominated	

=== Producers Guild Film Awards ===
The Producers Guild Film Awards (previously known as the Apsara Film & Television Producers Guild Awards) is an annual event organised by the Film Producers Guild of India.

Year	Film	Category	Result	Ref.
2008	Jab We Met	Best Director	Nominated	
2008	Jab We Met	Best Screenplay	Nominated	
2008	Jab We Met	Best Dialogues	Won	
2010	Love Aaj Kal	Best Director	Nominated	
2010	Love Aaj Kal	Best Story	Won	
2010	Love Aaj Kal	Best Screenplay	Nominated	
2010	Love Aaj Kal	Best Dialogues	Nominated	
2012	Rockstar	Best Director	Nominated	
2012	Rockstar	Best Screenplay	Nominated	
2015	Highway	Best Director	Nominated	
2015	Highway	Best Story	Nominated	
2015	Highway	Best Screenplay	Nominated	
2015	Highway	Best Dialogues	Nominated	

=== Screen Awards ===
The Screen Awards are presented annually by Indian Express Limited to honour excellence in Hindi cinema.

Year	Film	Category	Result	Ref.
2008	Jab We Met	Best Story	Nominated	
2008	Jab We Met	Best Screenplay	Nominated	
2008	Jab We Met	Best Dialogue	Nominated	
2010	Love Aaj Kal	Best Director	Nominated	
2010	Love Aaj Kal	Best Story	Won	
2010	Love Aaj Kal	Best Screenplay	Nominated	
2010	Love Aaj Kal	Best Dialogue	Nominated	
2015	Highway	Best Director	Nominated	

=== Other awards ===
Year	Film	Category	Result	Ref.
2017	—N/a	Kenya Tourism Board – IIFTC Tourism Impact Awards	Won	
2019	Jab Harry Met Sejal	Portuguese Government – Portuguese Touristic Medal of Merit	Won	
