= Jigra =

2024 Indian film by Vasan Bala

- Theatrical release poster
- Directed by: Vasan Bala
- Written by: Debashish Irengbam; Vasan Bala
- Produced by: Karan Johar; Apoorva Mehta; Alia Bhatt; Shaheen Bhatt; Soumen Mishra
- Starring: Alia Bhatt; Vedang Raina
- Cinematography: Swapnil S. Sonawane
- Edited by: Prerna Saigal
- Music by: Songs: R. D. Burman; Achint Thakkar; Manpreet Singh; Background Score: Achint Thakkar
- Production companies: Viacom18 Studios; Dharma Productions; Eternal Sunshine Productions
- Distributed by: Viacom18 Studios
- Release date: 11 October 2024
- Running time: 153 minutes
- Country: India
- Language: Hindi
- Budget: est. ₹80 crore
- Box office: est. ₹55.05 crore

Jigra (transl. Courage) is a 2024 Indian Hindi-language action thriller film directed by Vasan Bala, who co-wrote it with Debashish Irengbam. It is produced by Karan Johar, Apoorva Mehta, Alia Bhatt, Shaheen Bhatt and Soumen Mishra under Viacom18 Studios, Dharma Productions and Eternal Sunshine Productions. This is also the Bollywood debut of Rahul Ravindran. It stars Alia Bhatt as a troubled young woman who must rescue her brother (played by Vedang Raina) from a foreign prison after he is incarcerated for a crime he did not commit.

Principal photography took place in Mumbai and Singapore from October 2023 to February 2024. Jigra was theatrically released worldwide on 11 October 2024, coinciding with Vijayadashami, to mixed-to-positive reviews from critics, with praise directed towards Bhatt's performance and music. The film did not perform well financially, though at the 70th Filmfare Awards, it received four nominations and won two awards – Best Actress (Bhatt) and R. D. Burman Award (Achint Thakkar).

== Plot ==
Satya is a young woman who has faced more than her fair share of struggles. At a young age, she witnesses her father committing suicide and prevents her younger brother Ankur from seeing it. After being orphaned, the siblings are brought under the charge of rich, distant relatives. Satya never forgets that they are under obligation and works as a house staff manager. She knows the family's secrets and does everything she can to protect them. She becomes extremely protective of Ankur, bordering on paranoia. Ankur grows to be a bright, rule-abiding engineer. Satya, on the other hand, has no such inhibition, especially regarding her brother.

This quiet life takes a dramatic turn when Kabir, the son of the family, enters their life. He is a drug addict and is known to have been expelled from many universities. Satya views him with great trepidation but Ankur finds a friend in him and trusts him. Ankur develops computer software and needs a sponsor, which Kabir's father happily provides, hoping that it will change his son's life and his ways. The boys are sent on a business trip to a fictional country Hanshi Dao, where the laws are very strict. The country is also facing a revolution due to this. Its drug laws show no mercy, and for possession, a person is charged with death by electrocution. Kabir and Ankur are not aware of the laws, and they work and party. At one such party, Kabir buys drugs, unknown to Ankur. On the way, they are arrested for possession. Ankur calls his sister and tells her that he did not possess drugs, but Kabir did. Satya understands from her past dealings with her uncle that he will do anything to get his son out, leaving her brother in potential danger. A family lawyer convinces Ankur to save his cousin's life by lying that it was he who possessed the drugs. He conveniently mislays the fact that Ankur will be in jail only for three months, after that, he will be free. What he doesn't say is that after three months, Ankur will be executed for a crime that he did not commit.

Satya is devastated upon learning this. Determined to rescue her brother, she travels to Hanshi Dao, where Ankur is imprisoned, but only after burning her uncle's office. At Hanshi Dao, Satya finds herself entangled in a complex legal and social landscape. The only choice left to her is to break into the prison and rescue her brother. Ankur, on the other hand, manages to make an enemy out of warden Hansraj Landa because of his attitude to sticking to the rules. He, however, makes friends with three other inmates who are wrongly charged, just like him. They have been planning to escape through the sewage channel.

Meanwhile, Satya enlists the help of two unlikely allies: Bhatia, a former gangster whose son faces a similar predicament, and Muthu, an ex-policeman who deeply regrets his role in a previous wrongful conviction. Initially, Muthu does not agree with the plan but eventually gives in after a forceful persuasion by Satya. Coincidentally, Ankur has become friends with Bhatia's son Tony and Muthu's wrongfully convicted prisoner Chandan.

The rescue mission is meticulously planned with the help of Muthu, who knows the intricate layout of the prison due to his position as a warden in his pre-retirement days. The plan is to be carried out on a coast festival day when it is believed that the spirits come alive and no crime is committed. Unfortunately, on the same day, unbeknownst to them, the boys too, plan their escape. The boys poison their food to get admitted to the infirmary from where they plan to escape. Satya’s group, on the other hand, tries to get them assigned to kitchen duties. Landa becomes suspicious when he sees that two duties are assigned to the same three people. He intercepts the plans, and the boys are caught trying to escape. This pushes their date of execution ahead of schedule.

Satya gets anxious and decides to tamper with the prison’s power grid, aiming to disable the security system so all prisoners can escape. Muthu does not agree to this and tries to stop Satya, who kills him. Shutting the power grid off, however, proves useless as the prison's generators remain functional.

Satya adopts a bolder approach, resorting to explosives to create chaos within the prison. The desperate plan culminates in a thrilling escape scene where prisoners flood the corridors amid the power outrages. While escaping, Bhatia gets killed by a bullet. Satya and the boys flee by boat disguised as Doctors Without Borders but are pursued by prison guards led by the menacing Landa, who nearly captures them. Just as it seems all is lost, Malaysian authorities intercept as arranged by Muthu earlier, killing Landa. This finally allows Satya and the boys to return to India. Back home, Satya and Ankur revisit the house where they last saw their parents, closing a traumatic chapter.

The film ends on a haunting note as Satya, now victorious, confronts her memories and the lengths she was willing to go to protect her brother.

== Cast ==
- Alia Bhatt as Satyabhama "Satya" Anand
  - Aashna Vaishnav as young Satya
- Vedang Raina as Ankur Anand
  - Ayaansh Kireet Solanki as young Ankur
- Manoj Pahwa as Shekhar Bhatia
- Rahul Ravindran as Karthik "Muthu" Muthuraman
- Aditya Nanda as Kabir Mehtani
- Harssh A. Singh as Jaswant
- Ankur Khanna as Rayyan Diaz
- Vivek Gomber as OIC Hansraj Landa
- Srishti Wadhwani as Ratna
- Akashdeep Sabir as Mr. Mehtani
- Sheeba Sabir as Mrs. Mehtani
- Yuvraj Vijjan as Tony Bhatia
- Dheer Hira as Chandan Kumar
- Jason Shah as Matthew
- Jesse Lim as a detective
- Pranav Brara as Anupam Anand, Satya and Ankur's late father (cameo appearance)
- Akansha Ranjan Kapoor as a flight attendant (cameo appearance)
- Sikandar Kher (cameo appearance)
- Radhika Madan (cameo appearance)
- Abhimanyu Dassani (cameo appearance)
- Diljit Dosanjh (special appearance in the song "Chal Kudiye")

== Production ==
=== Casting ===
The film was announced in September 2023. Alia Bhatt and Vedang Raina were cast as the leads. In November 2023, Aditya Nanda and Sobhita Dhulipala joined the cast of the film.

The character of Hansraj Landa was loosely inspired by the character Hans Landa from Quentin Tarantino's film Inglourious Basterds. According to actor Bijou Thaangjam, he was cast for a role by the film producers but was dropped without notice; which he attributed to racism towards people from northeast India.

=== Filming ===
Principal photography commenced by October 2023. The film was mainly shot in Mumbai, Thailand and Singapore before wrapping in February 2024. These locations were chosen to portray the fictional country of Hanshi Dao in the film (which loosely resembles Singapore).

== Music ==
Jigra

Soundtrack album by Achint Thakkar and Manpreet Singh
- Released: 15 October 2024
- Recorded: 2023
- Studios: YRF Studios & Bombay Live Studio
- Genre: Feature film soundtrack
- Length: 21:31
- Language: Hindi
- Label: Saregama

Official audio
- Jigra – Full Album on YouTube

The film's music album, including background scores, is composed by Achint Thakkar with lyrics by Varun Grover. The song "Phoolon Ka Taaro Ka," originally composed by R. D. Burman and sung by Kishore Kumar in the film Haré Rama Haré Krishna (1971), is recreated for the film. It features the original lyrics by Burman and Anand Bakshi, with additional lyrics by Grover, and is sung by Vedang Raina.

The first single titled "Chal Kudiye" was released on 17 September 2024. The second single titled "Tenu Sang Rakhna" was released on 3 October 2024. The third single titled "Jigra Title Track" was released on 7 October 2024.

No.	Title	Lyrics	Music	Singer	Length
1.	"Tenu Sang Rakhna"	Varun Grover	Achint Thakkar	Arijit Singh, Anumita Nadesan, Achint Thakkar	4:09
2.	"Phoolon Ka Taaro Ka"	Anand Bakshi, Varun Grover	R. D. Burman, Achint Thakkar	Vedang Raina	2:28
3.	"Jiya"	Varun Grover	Achint Thakkar	Shaheen Bhatt	2:53
4.	"Jigra Title Track"	Varun Grover	Achint Thakkar	Vedang Raina	3:14
5.	"Jigra" (Acoustic Version)	Varun Grover	Achint Thakkar	Vedang Raina	3:09
6.	"Pan India Area King"	Achint Thakkar, Varun Grover	Achint Thakkar	Paal Dabba, Achint Thakkar	2:33
7.	"Chal Kudiye"	Harmanjeet Singh	Manpreet Singh	Diljit Dosanjh, Alia Bhatt	3:02
Total length:					21:31

== Release ==
=== Theatrical ===
The film was initially scheduled to release on 27 September 2024, but was later moved to 11 October 2024, to be nearer to Vijayadashami. The release was marred by accusations of plagiarism by actress Divya Khosla Kumar, who stated that Jigra was an unauthorized adaptation of her film Savi which had released less than five months prior, though some viewed this as a publicity stunt since the film's release clashed with that of her husband's production of Vicky Vidya Ka Woh Wala Video.

=== Home media ===
The film began streaming on Netflix from 6 December 2024.

== Reception ==
=== Critical response ===
Jigra received mixed-to-positive reviews from critics. On the review aggregator website Rotten Tomatoes, 71% of 17 critics' reviews are positive, with an average rating of 5.5/10.

News18 gave 4.5/5 and wrote "Despite being a narrative high on drama, Jigra never once felt theatrical. And the credit for the same goes to both the director and his actors. Jigra is audacious, trailblazing, sugar, spice, and everything nice and is a must-watch. Don’t miss this one." Filmfare gave 4/5 and wrote "With its strong performances and intricate storytelling, Jigra promises to keep audiences on the edge of their seats while delving into the powerful connections between family, justice, and the fight against oppression. Watch it for its realistic action scenes, its strong emotional core and for Vedang and Alia’s on point performances." Saibal Chatterjee of NDTV gave 3/5 and wrote "It goes without saying that Alia Bhatt does full justice to Jigra. The question is: does Jigra do justice to the quiet, measured flair that she brings to the role? Just about. And that, by all reckoning, is no mean feat."

Terming the film "dull", Tushar Joshi of India Today rated with 2.5/5 stars and wrote "Jigra could have been a much better film if the story wasn’t so linear." Eshita Bhargava of Financial Express rated 2.5/5 stars and wrote "‘Jigra’ failed to ignite the fervour it promised, primarily due to its stumbling script." Dhaval Roy of The Times of India gave 2.5/5 stars and wrote "its chaotic narrative and focus on style over substance hinder its overall impact. A more streamlined narrative and stronger premise would have elevated this film greatly."

Shubhra Gupta of The Indian Express rated with 2/5 stars and wrote "Jigra becomes a stretch, of both patience and credulity." The Statesman rated the film 2 stars, noting that it struggles to break away from its conventional path. Alia Bhatt’s character is solely motivated by her desire to save her brother, which leads to a predictable storyline that feels stretched and ultimately dull.

=== Box office ===
Jigra grossed ₹55.05 crore worldwide. It underperformed at the box office.

== Accolades ==
Award	Date of the ceremony	Category	Nominee/Work	Result	Ref.
International Indian Film Academy Awards	9 March 2025	Best Actress	Alia Bhatt	Nominated	
International Indian Film Academy Awards	9 March 2025	Best Supporting Actor	Manoj Pahwa	Nominated	
International Indian Film Academy Awards	9 March 2025	Best Performance in a Negative Role	Vivek Gomber	Nominated	
Filmfare Awards	11 October 2025	Best Actress	Alia Bhatt	Won	
Filmfare Awards	11 October 2025	Best Actress (Critics)	Alia Bhatt	Nominated	
Filmfare Awards	11 October 2025	Best Female Playback Singer	Anumita Nadesan (for "Tenu Sang Rakhna")	Nominated	
Filmfare Awards	11 October 2025	Best Action	Vikram Dahiya	Nominated	
Filmfare Awards	11 October 2025	R. D. Burman Award	Achint Thakkar	Won	

== See also ==
- Capital punishment in Singapore
