= Dear Maya =

- Directed by: Sunaina Bhatnagar
- Written by: Sunaina Bhatnagar; Dialogues: Sanjeev Dutta
- Produced by: Shobhna Yadav; Sandeep Leyzell
- Starring: Manisha Koirala; Shreya Chaudhry; Madiha Imam
- Cinematography: Sayak Bhattacharya
- Edited by: Aarti Bajaj
- Music by: Anupam Roy; Sandman
- Production company: Bake My Cake Films
- Distributed by: Wave Cinemas
- Release date: 2 June 2017
- Running time: 131 minutes
- Country: India
- Language: Hindi

Dear Maya is a 2017 Indian drama film directed by Sunaina Bhatnagar in her debut feature. The film stars Manisha Koirala in the title role of a lonely woman residing in the hill town of Shimla, Himachal Pradesh. Newcomers Shreya Chaudhry and Madiha Imam play supporting roles and filmmaker Rakeysh Omprakash Mehra makes a special appearance in the film which released theatrically on 2 June 2017.

== Plot ==
The film opens into the lives of teenage girls Anna and Ira, students at a convent (Catholic) school in Shimla. They are particularly close and divide their daytime between school and romance novels and boys and, occasionally, sleepovers. They are very intrigued by their reclusive middle-aged neighbor Maya Devi, who lives alone in a large house (with her two dogs) and rarely goes out. Anna's mother explains that Maya Devi lost her father early and lived in that house with her chacha (father's brother) and mother. Maya Devi was, and still is, a beautiful girl, but her chacha constantly thwarted her marriage (by berating her and chasing away suitors). This was because he stood to inherit her estate. In time he died, and Maya resigned herself to a dreary and solitary life.

Ira devises a plan to write love letters to Maya. The girls hope that this prank may bring some light into Maya's life. They write letters, vivid and touching and steamy, pretending to be a former suitor, now in Delhi, still pining for Maya. Ira takes the prank further by breaking into Maya's house one evening to steal a photograph. This goes badly; Ira breaks her ankle, as does Maya's maid; the girls are reprimanded, and Anna is tasked with filling in for the maid until the maid recovers. During this time, Anna gets a little closer to Maya. The letters still arrive, and Anna observes that Maya becomes happier with each new letter.

One day Maya stuns everyone by announcing that she is selling the house and moving to Delhi to find the letter writer, her long lost suitor. Anna discovers, to her horror, that the letter which prompted the decision was written by Ira and had an explicit invitation. She runs to dissuade Maya but is unable to do so. She confides in her mother. Anna is reprimanded and sent away to boarding school, away from Ira. Anna leaves without saying goodbye to Ira and they never speak again. Ira is shattered.

Torn by the guilt of her prank, Anna makes it her mission to find Maya in Delhi. Over the next six years, she sticks posters, makes phone calls, and follows every lead to find Maya. She finds a boyfriend, Rahul, who ultimately proposes to her but she is unable to accept. She returns to Shimla to discuss this with her parents. Ira visits her, but Anna is still angry and turns her away. Ira is profusely sorry and persists and ultimately accompanies Anna back to Delhi. Anna is still mad at Ira for her selfish and childish behaviour which likely destroyed Maya's life, but Ira reveals that she, too, had fallen in love with Shimla and had lost her love to a motor accident, and now, having lost love, is fully aware of the true consequences of her pranks. Anna forgives Ira and persuades her to transfer to a college in Delhi. But Ira decides to return to Shimla. As Anna bids goodbye to Ira at the train station, she receives a phone call from Maya.

The girls hurry to meet Maya. To their astonishment, they find her, bright and sparkling and happy, at the zoo garden. Maya reveals her story. She had arrived in Delhi and tried to trace the letter writer but found nothing. Instead, over time, she found that Delhi and the world outside Shimla were not so frightening after all. People were helpful and kind. And she eventually met a kind and charming man who owned a jewelry shop. In time she became close to this man, Ved, and they married. And today Maya is blissfully happy with her Ved. The letters changed her life, and she tells them to say 'yes' to life. Anna and Ira are stunned. They joyfully hug Maya, and she embraces them and invites them to call at any time.

The film ends as Anna accepts Rahul's proposal and Ira transfers to a college in Delhi.

== Cast ==
- Manisha Koirala as Maya Devi
- Shreya Chaudhry as Ira
- Madiha Imam as Anna
- Iravati Harshe as Anna's Mother
- Reuben Israel as Anna's Father
- Sahil Shroff as Rahul
- Rohit Suresh Saraf as Neal
- Madhu Rajesh as Ira's Mother
- Sahiba Bali as Radha
- Jared Savaille as Maya Devi's son
- Naila Grewal as Hostel Roommate
- Rakeysh Omprakash Mehra as Ved (special appearance)

== Production ==
Dear Maya was written and directed by debutante director Sunaina Bhatnagar. The film marked the return of actress Manisha Koirala, who was on sabbatical from the film industry after being diagnosed with cancer. It also features debutante actress Shreya Chaudhary and Madiha Imam in pivotal supporting roles. Principal photography for the film took place in Loreto Convent, Tara Hall, Shimla, Himachal Pradesh in March 2016.

== Marketing and release ==
The three-minutes long trailer for the film was released on YouTube on 5 May 2017, to positive response from critics and audience. Manisha Koirala's ability to play versatile roles was met with praise; as noted by a commentator from The Indian Express it was a perfect comeback for Koirala who is, "doing what she does best, playing interesting characters onscreen". The film had its theatrical release on 2 June 2017 in India. The film had limited screen shows as it only screened on 75 screens. It clashed with seven films at the box office.

== Soundtrack ==
Dear Maya

Soundtrack album by Anupam Roy & SandMan
- Released: 19 May 2017
- Genre: Feature film soundtrack
- Length: 21:04
- Label: Zee Music Company

The soundtrack of Dear Maya was composed by Anupam Roy & SandMan, while the lyrics were written by Irshad Kamil.

No.	Title	Music	Singer(s)	Length
1.	"Saat Rangon Se"	Anupam Roy	Rekha Bhardwaj	04:37
2.	"Sune Saaye"	Anupam Roy	Harshdeep Kaur	05:08
3.	"Kehne Ko"	Anupam Roy	Jonita Gandhi	04:26
4.	"Saat Rangon Se (Acoustic)"	Anupam Roy	Anupam Roy	04:35
5.	"Buri Buri"	SandMan	Rashi Mal	02:16
6.	"Background Score"	Anupam Roy	Anupam Roy	09:24
Total length:				21:04

== Reception ==
Upon release in India, Dear Maya received a mixed response. There was praise for Koirala's performance, but criticism of its overstretched narrative.
