= Main Vaapas Aaunga =

2026 Indian film by Imtiaz Ali

- Theatrical release poster
- Directed by: Imtiaz Ali
- Written by: Imtiaz Ali; Nayanika Mahtani
- Produced by: Sameer Nair; Deepak Segal; Mohit Choudhary; Shibhasish Sarkar
- Starring: Naseeruddin Shah; Diljit Dosanjh; Sharvari; Vedang Raina; Banita Sandhu
- Cinematography: Sylvester Fonseca
- Edited by: Aarti Bajaj
- Music by: A. R. Rahman
- Production companies: Applause Entertainment; Birla Studios; Window Seat Films
- Distributed by: Birla Studios
- Release date: 12 June 2026
- Running time: 167 minutes
- Country: India
- Language: Hindi
- Budget: ₹70 crore
- Box office: ₹98.2 crore

Main Vaapas Aaunga (transl. 'I will return') is a 2026 Indian Hindi-language romantic drama film directed by Imtiaz Ali. The film stars Naseeruddin Shah, Diljit Dosanjh, Sharvari, and Vedang Raina in lead roles, with Vinod Nagpal Dolly Ahluwalia, Rajat Kapoor, Sanjay Suri, Manish Chaudhari, Anjana Sukhani, Banita Sandhu, and Danish Pandor in supporting roles. The film centers on a grandson who cares for his dying, dementia-stricken grandfather as the elderly man revisits memories of a tragic romance during the partition of British India. Principal photography began in August 2025 and ended in December 2025.

The film was theatrically released on 12 June 2026. It received mostly positive reviews from critics, and emerged as a sleeper hit.

== Plot ==
95-year-old Ishar Singh Grewal alias Keenu suffers a stroke and is on his deathbed. Despite failing health and advancing dementia, he refuses to let go of life, desperately muttering about returning to his ancestral home in Sargodha, Punjab, Pakistan. His grandson, Nirvair, returns from London, and acting as his caregiver attempts to make sense of his disjointed ramblings.

The story goes back 78 years to British India. A younger Ishar is a rowdy young college student who loves jazz and cricket but is painfully awkward around young women. He falls in love with a young Muslim woman named Afsana alias Jiya. Their budding romance is abruptly shattered by the violence and mass migration of the Partition of British India. When Sikhs are forced to leave for East Punjab in India, Keenu and the men of his family flee, leaving both their female relatives and Jiya behind in the chaos. Having vowed to Jiya that he will never leave without her permission, Keenu returns six years after Partition to find his female relatives and reunite with Jiya, but he learns the bitter truth of what happened after the men fled and how orphaned Jiya had to marry Adil, the elder brother of his best friend Aftab, and his sister Phoola's best friend Rumana. Broken by his experiences during Partition and haunted by the disturbing fate of his female relatives, Keenu becomes a cold, angry man who terrorizes his family and has no close friends as Aftab too was murdered while protecting the Grewal women.

Nirvair investigates his grandfather’s past to give him peace, teasing the truth out of his grandfather’s ramblings with help from historians, archives, and his reluctant great-uncle, Pali. In Keenu’s final days, Nirvair takes advantage of his British passport and crosses into Pakistan, locating Jiya's family. He discovers a devastating truth: Jiya died 10 years prior, having spent her life waiting for Keenu to fulfill his promise to return. Through a video call, Keenu sees the older Jiya’s portrait and hallucinates a vision of a young Jiya. Elated that he can finally recite a poem he wrote for her long ago, Keenu finally asks Jiya for permission to leave. She grants it, allowing him to pass away peacefully.

The film ends with footage of real refugees across the world, enduring the same trauma and suffering as Keenu and the countless refugees caught in the crossfire of Partition.

== Cast ==
- Naseeruddin Shah as Ishar Singh Grewal a.k.a. "Keenu"
  - Vedang Raina as Young Ishar / "Keenu"
- Sharvari as Afsana Ahmedzai a.k.a "Jiya", Keenu's love interest
- Diljit Dosanjh as Nirvair "Nivi" Singh Grewal, Keenu's grandson
- Rajat Kapoor as Iqbal Singh Grewal, Keenu's elder son and Nirvair's father
- Anjana Sukhani as Anjana Kaur Grewal, Nirvair's aunt
- Vinod Nagpal as Kitpal Singh Grewal a.k.a "Pali", Keenu's younger brother
  - Abhay Rana as child Pali
- Jaipreet Singh as Angad Singh Grewal, Keenu's younger son and Nirvair's uncle
- Banita Sandhu as Kaveri, Nirvair's girlfriend
- Danish Pandor as Afzal, the rioter
- Shivendra Singh Mahal as Gurveer Singh Grewal, Keenu's grandfather
- Dolly Ahluwalia as Keenu's grandmother
- Sanjay Suri as Jasmer Singh Grewal, Keenu, Phoola and Pali's father
- Manish Chaudhari as Syed Muzaffar Ahmedzai, Adil, Aftab and Rumana's father
- Rasika Agashe as Protima, Nirvair's guide
- Kashmira Irani as Kishwar, Keenu's guide in Sargodha
- Sahil Mehta as Syed Adil Ahmedzai, Afsana's husband
- Shruti Sodhi as Jaya, Nirvair's friend
- Mashhoor Amrohi as Sarfaraz Rahman
- Aliyah Khan as Phoola Kaur Grewal, Keenu's sister
- Butta Badbar as Inderjeet Singh Grewal, Keenu's uncle
- Harshul Kaul as Syed Aftab Ahmedzai, Keenu's best-friend
- Leena Sharma as Zainab, Afsana's mother
- Kumud Mishra as BSF Chief (special appearance)
- Nikhat Khan as Rumana Ahmedzai, Phoola's best-friend (special appearance)
  - Isha Sandhir as young Rumana

== Production ==
=== Development ===
The film was announced in June 2025, with Diljit Dosanjh, Naseeruddin Shah, Vedang Raina, Sharvari, and Banita Sandhu joining the cast.⁣ It is the second collaboration between director Imtiaz Ali and Diljit Dosanjh.

=== Filming ===
Principal photography for the film commenced in Punjab in October 2025.

== Soundtrack ==
The film's music is composed by A. R. Rahman, with lyrics written by Irshad Kamil. The first single, titled "Kya Kamaal Hai," was released on 17 April 2026. The second single "Maskara" was released on 5 May 2026.

== Marketing ==
On 13 March 2026, four first-look posters were unveiled.

On 7 June 2026, A.R. Rahman, Nilanjana Ghosh, Vedang Raina, Mohit Chauhan, and Pooja Tiwari performed live at the Attari–Wagah border ceremony in Attari, Amritsar. Imtiaz Ali, who was also present there along with the cast and crew of the film, said, "I am privileged to be a part of this troupe, and it is magical that this event is around Main Vaapas Aaunga, a film that originates from the making of the border during the Partition of 1947. Not only were homes and lives lost, but hearts were broken as well. We bring a message of love because, ultimately, only love sustains us."

== Release ==
=== Theatrical ===
Main Vaapas Aaunga was released on 12 June 2026. It was earlier planned to release in April 2026, coinciding with Baisakhi.

=== Home media ===
The film began streaming on Netflix from 7 August 2026.

== Reception ==
=== Box office ===
On its opening day, the film earned ₹1.28 crore at the domestic box office.

Main Vaapas Aaunga grossed ₹100.63 crore (US$11 million) worldwide. It grossed ₹78.65 crore (US$8.4 million) in India and ₹21.98 crore (US$2.3 million) in the overseas market.

On 31 July 2026, the film completed 50 days at the box office.

=== Critical response ===
On the review aggregator website Rotten Tomatoes, 86% of 14 critics' reviews are positive, with an average rating of 6.70/10.

Sukanya Verma of rediff.com gave the film 4 out of 5 stars, calling it a 'rare gem' and writing, "At a time when the politics of hostility has engulfed the world and escalated it into senseless wars—most evocatively captured in the end credits song Kya Kamaal Hai, filled with devastating images of uprooted victims from conflict-torn lands—Main Vaapas Aaunga's unwavering belief in love is a testament to cinema's uplifting gifts." Kartik Bhardwaj of Cinema Express also gave the film 4 stars out of 5, noting, "Main Vaapas Aaunga is about Punjab, about the buried trauma of the refugees, and how pain gives birth to patriarchy." Shubhra Gupta of The Indian Express gave the film 3 out of 5 stars and described the film as "an astounding take on Partition trauma." She particularly praised Shah's performance, calling it "superbly judged." Aishani of Outlook India reviewed the film and gave 3.5 out of 5 stars and wrote that Dosanjh and Shah anchor a moving story of memory, migration, and longing. Anuj Kumar of The Hindu described the movie as "an evocative exploration of memory, loss, and longing, praising Imtiaz Ali's storytelling and the performances of Naseeruddin Shah and Diljit Dosanjh."

Reviewing for the Hindustan Times, Rishabh Suri praised the film for its emotional resonance and described it as "a film that transforms memory and longing into compelling cinema." Dhaval Roy of Times of India gave 3.5 out of 5 stars and praised its performances and emotional storytelling, while noting that the film successfully captures "the pain and human consequences of partition." Reviewing for NDTV, Saeed Naqvi gave the film 3.5 out of 5 stars and wrote that Naseeruddin Shah delivers a "masterclass" performance in a heartbreaking narrative. Nandini Ramnath of Scroll.in writes in her review that "The film boldly confronts the severe psychological repression that followed Partition. However, Main Vaapas Aaunga sticks to the conventional portrayal of Muslims as the aggressors in communal riots." Vineeta Kumar of India Today, I rated it 2 out of 5 stars and described the film as Ali's weakest film, writing, "The film reaches for grief and belonging, but its pacing and politics blunt the impact."
