= Vedaa =

2024 Indian film by Nikkhil Advani

- Theatrical release poster
- Directed by: Nikkhil Advani
- Written by: Aseem Arora
- Produced by: Umesh KR Bansal; Monisha Advani; Madhu Bhojwani; John Abraham
- Starring: John Abraham; Sharvari; Abhishek Banerjee; Ashish Vidyarthi; Tamannaah Bhatia
- Cinematography: Malay Prakash
- Edited by: Maahir Zaveri
- Music by: Songs: Amaal Mallik; Manan Bhardwaj; Yuva; Raghav–Arjun; Score: Kartik Shah
- Production companies: Zee Studios; Emmay Entertainment; JA Entertainment
- Distributed by: Zee Studios
- Release date: 15 August 2024
- Running time: 151 minutes
- Country: India
- Language: Hindi
- Budget: ₹60 crore
- Box office: est. ₹26.71 crore

Vedaa is a 2024 Indian Hindi-language action drama film directed by Nikkhil Advani and written by Aseem Arora.The film is inspired by true events.It stars John Abraham and Sharvari as the title character, alongside Abhishek Banerjee, Ashish Vidyarthi, Kumud Mishra, Rajendra Chawla, Tanvi Malhara, Anurag Thakur and Urvashi Dubey along with Tamannaah Bhatia in a special appearance.

Vedaa was released on 15 August 2024, coinciding with Independence Day, to mixed-to-positive reviews from critics but underperformed at the box office.

== Plot ==
Vedaa Berwa, a Dalit law student, lives with her family in Barmer, Rajasthan, where Jitendar Pratap Singh is the chief of 150 villages. Vedaa is always being abused and tortured by the upper-caste people due to caste discrimination. Vedaa learns that Jitendra's brother Suyog Pratap Singh has organized a boxing club at the college and decides to train herself in boxing to protect her family.

Major Abhimanyu Kanwar is court-martialed by the Indian Army for disobeying orders to bring Ilyas Kashmiri, a terrorist, alive. Abhimanyu killed Ilyas Kashmiri as he was responsible for the death of Abhimanyu's wife Raashi. Abhimanyu arrives at Raashi's village in Barmer and joins as an assistant sports coach in Vedaa's college. Vedaa is not allowed to enroll in boxing due to her caste and gender, but Abhimanyu sees a spark in Vedaa and begins to train her secretly.

Meanwhile, Vedaa's brother Vinod Berwa is in love with Arati, an upper-caste woman, and they maintain their relationship secretly, but they are caught and a kangaroo court punishes Vinod. Despite this, Vinod elopes with Arati and get married. Jitendar tricks Vinod and Arati into returning to Barmer and has them slaughtered. Vedaa's sister Gehna gets burnt alive, but Vedaa escapes and seeks the help of Abhimanyu, who vows to protect Vedaa.

Vedaa decides to leave for the city court and file a case against Jitendar under Dalit Protection Act. They escape and manages to eradicate Jitendra's men, which includes corrupt cops, goons and Suyog. Vedaa and Abhimanyu reach the court, where Jitendra and his men attack them. Vedaa pleads for her rights before the judges, who agrees. Abhimanyu manages to kill Jitendar, but succumbs to his injuries, thus fulfilling his vow of protecting Vedaa.

== Cast ==
- John Abraham as Abhimanyu Kanwar, a former Indian Army Major
- Sharvari as Vedaa Berwa
- Abhishek Banerjee as Jitendar Pratap Singh
- Ashish Vidyarthi as Kaka
- Kumud Mishra as Mausaji
- Rajendra Chawla as Vedaa's father
- Tanvi Malhara as Gehna, Vedaa's sister
- Anurag Thakur as Vinod, Vedaa's elder brother
- Urvashi Dubey as Aarti, Vinod's fiancèe
- Rajoshri Vidyarthi as Vedaa's mother
- Parag Sharma as Sunehre
- Danish Husain as Mountbatten
- Kapil Nirmal as API Bhimsen Purohit
- Ajeet Singh Palawat as ASI Raghu Meena
- K. C. Shankar as C. O. Bharadwaj
- Kshitij Chauhan as Suyog Pratap Singh
- Akshay Sharma as Raj Kishore, Suyog's gang member
- Toshab Bagri as Bhanu Singh, Suyog's gang member
- Abhishek Deswal as Major Deepanshu
- Paritosh Sand as Headmaster Uttamlal Singh
- Gowhar Khan as Ilyas Kashmiri
- Nirmal Chaudhury as Mr Meghwal
- Manu Shekhar as Reporter Faisal
- Monisha Advani as judge

=== Special appearances ===
- Tamannaah Bhatia as Raashi Kanwar, Abhimanyu's wife
- Mouni Roy in the song "Mummy Ji"

== Production ==
The filming began on 20 June 2023 in Rajasthan. The shoot was wrapped up in Kashmir in December 2023. The makers of the film announced their concerns on 25 July 2024 via social media that the Central Board of Film Certification (CBFC) had not yet screened the film, despite the application being submitted a month earlier. Following that, it was noted that the CBFC's Examining Committee viewed the film on 22 June, but feedback was not provided to the makers until the film was referred to the Revising Committee on 25 June. The Revising Committee screened the film on 29 July, which led to the deletion of 9.14 minutes and the implementation of certain changes. After these modifications, Vedaa was granted a U/A certificate on 6 August 2024, with a final runtime of 151 minutes.

== Music ==
Vedaa

Soundtrack album by Amaal Mallik, Manan Bhardwaj, Yuva and Raghav–Arjun
- Released: 13 August 2024
- Genre: Feature film soundtrack
- Length: 25:03
- Language: Hindi
- Label: Zee Music Company

Official audio
- Vedaa (Audio Jukebox) on YouTube

The music of the film is composed by Amaal Mallik, Manan Bhardwaj, Yuva and Raghav–Arjun while the background score is completed by Kartik Shah. The first single titled "Holiyaan" was released on 3 August 2024. The second single titled "Mummy Ji" was released on 7 August 2024. The third single titled "Zaroorat Se Zyada" was released on 10 August 2024. The entire album featuring 6 tracks was released on 13 August 2024.

The song "Holiyaan," from the album Bichhuda, sung by Ila Arun is recreated for the film.

Tracks
No.	Title	Lyrics	Music	Singer(s)	Length
1.	"Zaroorat Se Zyada"	Kunaal Vermaa	Amaal Mallik	Arijit Singh	5:36
2.	"Holiyaan"	Arushi Kaushal, MC Square	Yuva	Nikhita Gandhi, Asha Sapera, MC Square	3:05
3.	"Dhaage"	Raghav–Arjun	Raghav–Arjun	Raghav–Arjun, Raghav Chaitanya	3:34
4.	"Mummy Ji"	Manan Bhardwaj	Manan Bhardwaj	Prajakta Shukre, Himani Kapoor, Manan Bhardwaj	3:22
5.	"Zaroorat Se Zyada" (Female Version)	Kunaal Vermaa	Amaal Mallik	Shreya Ghoshal	5:34
6.	"Zaroorat Se Zyada" (Duet)	Kunaal Vermaa	Amaal Mallik	Arijit Singh, Shreya Ghoshal	3:52
Total length:					25:03

== Release ==
=== Theatrical ===
Vedaa was released on 15 August 2024, coinciding with Independence Day, along with dubbed versions of Tamil and Telugu languages.

=== Home media ===
The satellite and digital rights for the film were acquired by Zee Network. The film began streaming on ZEE5 from 10 October 2024.

== Reception ==
=== Critical response ===
Vedaa received mixed reviews from critics. On the review aggregator website Rotten Tomatoes, 44% of 9 critics' reviews are positive, with an average rating of 5.6/10.

Deepa Gahlot of Rediff.com rated 3/5 stars and notes "Vedaa is realistic but also has the kind of mainstream elements and action sequences that make a film gripping." A critic for Bollywood Hungama rated the film 2.5 stars out of 5 and wrote, "Vedaa is a predictable fare with a weak climax and an unremarkable second half." Rishabh Suri of the Hindustan Times commented, "John Abraham and Sharvari's thriller on caste system gets you thinking, delivers a hard-hitting message." He opined that the film marks a significant shift for director Nikhil Advani, tackling the heavy themes of casteism and honour killings with a blend of action and drama, although it falters with unrealistic character survivals and weak music. While John Abraham delivers a passable performance as a grieving officer, Sharvari shines in her role as the resilient titular character, culminating in a climactic court battle that effectively highlights the film's core message. Lachmi Deb Roy of Firstpost gave the film 3/5 stars, remarking, "Flawed, but a brave film on Dalit rights." She pointed out that the film tackles the pressing issue of Dalit rights with a compelling narrative; yet, its impact is diminished by excessive violence overshadowing the social message. While John Abraham delivers a predictable performance, it is Sharvari and Abhishek Banerjee who shine, bringing depth to their roles in a film that ultimately leaves the audience reflecting on societal inequalities.

Saibal Chatterjee of NDTV India rated the film 2.5/5 stars, commenting, "John Abraham's film manages occasionally to tide over its troughs." According to him, the film is a caste oppression thriller that stands out in mainstream Bollywood by centring on a young Dalit woman's struggle for dignity and equality, with John Abraham's character supporting her quest. Despite its reliance on genre tropes and a somewhat diluted narrative, the film effectively highlights the harsh realities of caste violence while showcasing strong performances, particularly from Sharvari as the determined protagonist. Sana Farzeen of India Today gave the film 2.5 stars, stating, "John Abraham's film makes you wish for a fast-forward button." She noted that the film attempts to tackle the significant issue of caste in India but ultimately falters due to a slow pace and underdeveloped character arcs, particularly in Sharvari's titular role. While John Abraham shines in action sequences, the film lacks impactful moments and emotional depth, making it a forgettable experience despite its noble intentions. Troy Ribeiro of The Free Press Journal gave 2.5/5 stars and wrote "It’s a mixed bag—a cinematic attempt to grapple with weighty issues while delivering the action-packed thrills that John Abraham fans expect. The result is a film that entertains but falls short of providing a knockout blow, leaving the audience with a lingering sense that the fight, much like Vedaa’s journey, isn’t quite over yet."

Shubhra Gupta of The Indian Express rated the film 2/5 stars, commenting, "Sharvari breaks the mould as John Abraham gets to slice and dice." In her view, the film presents a commendable yet flawed narrative centered on a young Dalit woman's struggle against caste oppression but ultimately succumbs to the conventional Bollywood trope of sidelining its female lead in favour of male heroism. Despite Sharvari's strong performance and the film's poignant moments, the predictable plot and character arcs dilute its impact, leaving audiences questioning whether Vedaa's journey truly receives the focus it deserves. Sreeparna Sengupta of The Times of India gave the film 3.5/5 stars, stating, "Film with a message, packed with a solid punch." She noted that the film effectively combines a compelling narrative against caste-based injustices with high-octane action, showcasing John Abraham's impressive physicality and Sharvari's emotional depth as the title character. While the film occasionally falls into predictable tropes and features a convoluted climax, its gritty atmosphere and adrenaline-pumping sequences make it an engaging watch. Anuj Kumar of The Hindu wrote "Despite a solid turn by Sharvari, Nikkhil Advani’s attempt to give a real social issue a larger-than-life treatment creates an uneven impact." Amit Bhatia of ABP Live wrote "Nikhil Advani’s direction is commendable, but after a strong start, the film could have achieved more. Unfortunately, it falls short in the second half, which could have been significantly better with more effort. Overall, the movie is still enjoyable. Shawari and the film's subject deserve extra recognition."

=== Box office ===
Vedaa grossed ₹6.52 crore on its opening day at the domestic box office. As of 30 August 2024, the film has grossed an estimated ₹25.93 crore at the worldwide box office.
