= Bunty Aur Babli 2 =

2021 Indian film by Varun V. Sharma

- Theatrical release poster
- Directed by: Varun V. Sharma
- Written by: Varun V. Sharma
- Story by: Aditya Chopra
- Based on: Characters by Jaideep Sahni
- Produced by: Aditya Chopra
- Starring: Saif Ali Khan; Rani Mukerji; Siddhant Chaturvedi; Sharvari; Pankaj Tripathi
- Cinematography: Gavemic U. Ary
- Edited by: Aarif Sheikh
- Music by: Score: Julius Packiam; Songs: Shankar–Ehsaan–Loy
- Production company: Yash Raj Films
- Distributed by: Yash Raj Films
- Release date: 19 November 2021
- Running time: 145 minutes
- Country: India
- Language: Hindi
- Budget: ₹45 crore
- Box office: ₹22.12 crore

Bunty Aur Babli 2 (transl. Bunty and Babli 2) is a 2021 Indian Hindi-language crime comedy film written and directed by Varun V. Sharma, based on a story by producer Aditya Chopra, under the banner of Yash Raj Films. A sequel to the 2005 film Bunty Aur Babli, the film stars Saif Ali Khan, Rani Mukerji, Siddhant Chaturvedi and debutante Sharvari.

Initially scheduled for theatrical releases on 26 June 2020 and 23 April 2021, the film was postponed due to the COVID-19 pandemic in India. It was released theatrically on 19 November 2021 and received negative reviews from critics, emerging as a box-office bomb.

== Plot ==
Sixteen years have passed since Rakesh Trivedi and his wife Vimmi Saluja Trivedi retired from conning others with the brand "Bunty Aur Babli" for money, having been let go by DCP Dashrath Singh.

A businessman named Chaddha, as well as his rich affiliates, decide to invest money in a "party nation" by Chaddha's assistant and his friend. However, it soon turns out that Chaddha and his associates have been conned, and the culprits, revealed to be Kunal Singh and Sonia Rawat, decide to take on the pseudonym "Bunty Aur Babli", having heard stories of the original "Bunty Aur Babli" who were never caught, assuming that they would be able to escape from the clutches of the law, too. Rakesh has since become a railway ticket collector at Phursatganj, Uttar Pradesh and Vimmi, a homemaker who looks after her now grown up son, Pappu. Pretty soon, they are holed up by the police, whence Inspector Jatayu Singh, who previously served as JCP Dashrath's junior, refuses to take their word for it after confronting them with the "Bunty Aur Babli" fiasco, and keeps them under prison surveillance. Despite these efforts, however, Varanasi's Mayor Chutvaa Chaubey, who successfully cleans up the Ganga River, is conned by "Bunty Aur Babli" yet again, albeit on a good note for a social cause, making the river leasable. Nonetheless, a fuming Rakesh and Vimmi decide to find out whoever is misusing their identity and capture the flag, claiming that they are the real players. What follows is a cat-and-mouse game and, later as the duo discover Kunal's and Sonia's identity, a war between the two con-couples, which culminates in a con job in Abu Dhabi.

== Cast ==
- Saif Ali Khan as Rakesh Trivedi
- Rani Mukerji as Vimmi Trivedi
- Siddhant Chaturvedi as Kunal Singh
- Sharvari as Sonia Rawat
- Pankaj Tripathi as Inspector Jayatu Singh
- Prem Chopra as Papaji
- Asrani as Tehrey Singh
- Yashpal Sharma as Chutvaa Chaubey
- Brijendra Kala as Mehmood Bhai
- Rajiv Gupta as Inspector Rajiv Gupta
- Neeraj Sood as Karan Chaddha
- Gopal Datt as Nand Kishore
- Mohit Baghel as Golu Chaubey
- Agrim Mittal as Dev "Pappu" Trivedi

== Production ==
=== Development ===
The film was announced on 19 December 2019 as a spiritual sequel to the 2005 film, with Rani Mukerji reprising her role, while Saif Ali Khan was cast opposite Mukerji, replacing Abhishek Bachchan. Siddhant Chaturvedi and debutant Sharvari were cast as the younger leads of the film. While Bachchan was approached to reprise his role, he declined, leading to Khan being cast.

=== Filming ===
Principal photography began in December 2019 in Mumbai. In February 2020, the second schedule of the film began in Abu Dhabi, which concluded in March 2020. Filming wrapped in September 2020.

== Music ==
Bunty Aur Babli 2

Soundtrack album by Shankar–Ehsaan–Loy
- Released: 1 November 2021
- Recorded: 2020
- Genre: Feature Film Soundtrack
- Length: 13:19
- Language: Hindi
- Label: YRF Music
- Producer: Devansh Bhatia

Shankar–Ehsaan–Loy chronology
Toofaan (2021)	Bunty Aur Babli 2 (2021)	Samrat Prithviraj (2022)

Official audio
- Bunty Aur Babli 2 - Full Album on YouTube

The film's music was composed by Shankar–Ehsaan–Loy, with lyrics written by Amitabh Bhattacharya.

Track Listing
No.	Title	Singer(s)	Length
1.	"Tattoo Waaliye"	Neha Kakkar, Pardeep Sran	3:06
2.	"Luv Ju"	Arijit Singh	4:04
3.	"Bunty Aur Babli 2"	Siddharth Mahadevan, Bohemia	3:16
4.	"Dhik Chik"	Mika Singh, Sunidhi Chauhan	2:53
Total length:			13:19

== Release ==
=== Theatrical ===
Bunty Aur Babli 2 was initially scheduled for a theatrical release on 26 June 2020, however it was postponed due to the COVID-19 pandemic. It was released theatrically on 19 November 2021.

=== Home media ===
The film began streaming on Amazon Prime Video from 17 December 2021.

== Reception ==
=== Critical response ===
Upon release, Bunty Aur Babli 2 received negative reviews from critics.

On the review aggregator website Rotten Tomatoes, 17% of 12 critics' reviews are positive, with an average rating of 4.6/10.

Monika Rawal Kukreja of Hindustan Times described the film as a "snooze-fest" and wrote, "Rani Mukerji is the saving grace in this snooze-fest, don't watch even if paid for it." She called it a "terribly-written and poorly-executed film" and further wrote, "Bunty Aur Babli 2 had all the right ingredients to serve a perfect dish, but too much mixing left it with no great after taste." Shalini Langer from The Indian Express gave the film a rating of 2.5/5 and wrote, "Director Varun V. Sharma doesn't think Rani Mukherji-Saif Ali Khan are enough to repeat the success of the original, so he keeps falling back on Siddhant and Sharvari, who are not bad but nothing we haven’t seen before. However, his bigger crime is reducing the original Bunty and Babli to colorful, atrocious parodies of their selves." Ronak Kotecha from The Times of India gave the film a rating of 2.5/5 and wrote, "Bunty Aur Babli 2 had an exciting premise to revive the two iconic characters, but this sequel feels like quite a con-job in comparison with its original." Saibal Chatterjee from NDTV gave the film a rating of 2/5 and wrote, "Comic timing comes easy to Rani and Saif; They are saddled with wisecracks that are devoid of wisdom. Siddhant and Sharvari, who don a variety of guises, make an enthusiastic screen pair; But the script plays spoilsport." Anupama Chopra of Film Companion wrote, "Bunty Aur Babli 2 has a repetitive plot and forgettable dialogues; Few of the jokes land and the ease with which the cons are pulled off becomes, beyond a point, plain silly."

Bollywood Hungama gave the film a rating of 1.5/5 and wrote, "Bunty Aur Babli 2 is a poor show and no way close to the first part." They praised the performances of Chaturvedi and Sharvari, but criticized Mukerji and Khan's performance by stating, "Rani Mukerji is too loud and over the top and is not in sync with her character in the first half; Saif Ali Khan is not in a great form and its pretty shocking since he's known to ace in all kinds of genres. Siddhant Chaturvedi leaves a mark and proves that he's a hero material and Sharvari makes a confident debut and looks sizzling." Devansh Sharma of Firstpost gave the film a rating of 2/5 and wrote, "Bunty Aur Babli 2 is sincere in its attempt to keep the brand alive and continue the narrative organically; But it chooses to ignore all the signs, all the red flags, and decides to cover them up under a flashy exterior. It touches upon the pros and cons of conning in the age of internet and social media, but only superficially. It also comments on the unsuccessful attempts at Ganga rejuvenation by the current government, but never takes a dive into it."

=== Box office ===
Bunty Aur Babli 2 earned ₹2.60 crore domestically on its opening day and ₹8.30 crore in its opening weekend.

As of 16 December 2021, the film earned ₹14.88 crore domestically and ₹7.24 crore overseas, grossing ₹22.12 crore worldwide.
