= The Mehta Boys =

2025 film by Boman Irani

- Promotional release poster
- Directed by: Boman Irani
- Written by: Boman Irani; Alexander Dinelaris
- Produced by: Boman Irani; Danesh Irani; Shujaat Saudagar; Vipin Agnihotri
- Starring: Avinash Tiwary; Boman Irani
- Cinematography: Krish Makhija
- Edited by: Charu Shree Roy
- Production companies: Irani Movietone; Chalkboard Entertainment
- Distributed by: Metro-Goldwyn-Mayer (through Amazon MGM Studios)
- Release date: 7 February 2025
- Running time: 118 minutes
- Country: India
- Language: Hindi

The Mehta Boys (transl. The Elite Boys) is a 2025 Indian Hindi-language drama film co-written, co-produced, and directed by Boman Irani. It is about a troubled father-son relationship, and stars Irani, Avinash Tiwary, and Shreya Chaudhry. It was released on 7 February 2025 on Amazon Prime Video.

== Plot ==
The story follows Amay Mehta, a workaholic bachelor and architect living in Mumbai. He aspires to present his designs to his boss but always hesitates, lacking confidence or feeling that something is missing in his projects. His colleague, Zara, encourages him, insisting that he is one of the best architects in their firm.

One day, Amay receives a letter from his sister informing him of their mother's passing. He travels to his hometown for the funeral, where he struggles to get along with his father, Shiv Mehta. Shiv, devastated by the loss of his wife, plans to move to the US with his daughter. However, due to a delay in his flight, he is forced to stay in Mumbai for two more days. Before leaving, Amay's sister convinces both Amay and Shiv to get along for the next 48 hours.

Shiv moves into Amay's house, only to discover his son's poor living conditions. Despite his ambition, Amay's workaholic nature has affected both his family and personal life. They argue over who should sleep on the sofa or bed—Amay wants to take care of his father, while Shiv insists on making his son comfortable so he can focus on work. Their situation worsens due to Shiv's childish and stubborn behavior, such as interfering with the car's handbrake and attempting to carry heavy luggage by himself.

One night, over drinks, their conversation turns into an argument when Shiv insults Amay's profession as an architect. Despite their differences, Shiv expresses a desire to meet Zara, leading to a dinner outing. However, when Amay insists on paying the bill despite Shiv's refusal, tensions rise. Shiv, realizing what happened, storms out angrily, leaving behind his bag containing his passport and ticket.

As Amay rushes to return home, he almost crashes his car when Shiv suddenly pulls the handbrake. Unable to contain his frustration any longer, Amay explodes in anger. The heated argument that follows reveals the true reason for their strained relationship—Shiv believes that life is incomplete without family. He had once left behind his own for a better life but ended up with nothing, which is why they had not spoken for years.

After their argument, Shiv wanders the streets and mistakenly follows a woman, thinking she is his late wife. In his distracted state, he meets with an accident. Upon hearing the news, Amay rushes to the hospital, only to be confronted by Zara, who harshly reminds him of his responsibilities as a son.

Amay finally presents his project to his team where upon facing criticism, he passionately argues against blindly adopting Western architecture, insisting that shifting away from one's culture is a mistake. His project gets approved, marking a turning point in his career. Later, he visits his hometown to thank his father, realizing that his scolding was never out of anger but rather an attempt to teach him valuable life lessons.

At the airport, father and son share a final farewell. As Amay returns home, he finds everything clean and renovated. The film ends as he turns off the light, fading into a black screen.

== Cast ==
- Boman Irani as Mr. Shiv Mehta
- Avinash Tiwary as Amay Mehta
- Shreya Chaudhry as Zara
- Puja Sarup as Anu
- Champa Flora David Jacob as receptionist
- Siddhartha Basu as Saumik Sen, Amay's boss & head of Sen and Sons architecture firm

== Reception ==
On the review aggregator website Rotten Tomatoes, 100% of 12 critics' reviews are positive, with an average rating of 7.1/10.

Shubhra Gupta of The Indian Express rated 3.5/5 and said "The theme of the film has a familiar predictive tilt, but what lifts the film are the little spurts of unpredictability built into the script of Boman Irani’s directorial debut." Saibal Chatterjee of NDTV gave it 3 out of 5 stars and said that "The heart-warming drama is enlivened by the wonderful central performances from Boman Irani and Avinash Tiwary, perfectly complemented by Shreya Chaudhry." Abhimanyu Mathur of Hindustan Times said " Boman Irani's directorial debut is a splendid film anchored by his performance as well as a class act from Avinash Tiwary."

Abhishek Srivastava of The Times of India gave 4 stars out 5 and said that "‘The Mehta Boys’ is a finely crafted drama that feels deeply personal, as if drawn from real-life experiences within one's own home or neighborhood." Anuj Kumar of The Hindu observes about the film that "Redolent with mood and motifs, Avinash Tiwary shines in this tender tale of grief and gratitude told with wit and vigor." Sana Farzeen of India Today gave 3 stars out of 5 and said that "The Mehta Boys explores a complex father-son bond with realism and subtlety. Boman Irani impresses as both director and actor, while Avinash Tiwary shines. Though the resolution feels conventional, the film's authenticity makes it a refreshing watch".
