= Sagnik Sen =

Indian singer (born 1986)

Sagnik Sen সাগ্নিক সেন
- Born: November 18, 1986 (age 39); Kolkata, West Bengal
- Origin: Kolkata
- Genres: Adhunik song; Rabindra Sangeet
- Occupation: Singer
- Years active: 2014–present
- Spouse: Anubha Sen
- Website: sagniksen.com

Sagnik Sen (born November 18, 1986) is a singer from Kolkata known for performing songs originally sung by the singer and music director Hemanta Mukhopadhyay. Born in 1986, Sen heard and learned the songs of Mukhopadhyay and Rabindra Sangeet.

His family members including his father and mother frequently practiced singing, from when his father sang a few songs in Bengali movies and events. He pursued his education in computer science, but had to stop mid-way because of the death of his father Swapan Sen. After supporting his family business for about 8 years, Sen entered his career of singing. He made his debut by singing in the show The Legends in 2015.

From 2017, he made many appearances in concerts, tours and musical events, singing songs related to Mukherjee. He supported the reconstruction of a college in 2018.

== Career ==
=== Early life ===
Sagnik Sen was born on November 18, 1986 in Kolkata, West Bengal. In his childhood, he was interested in the songs of Hemanta Mukhopadhyay and Rabindra Sangeet and actively learned them. He also listened to the songs of other singers during the Golden Era of Bengali cinema and Adhunik (modern) songs. In 2015, music director Devjit Roy gave Sen his first song to sing in his contributed TV show The Legends, where Sen made his debut as a singer.

Sen's household were marked by singing practices by his family members, including his father Swapan Sen and mother Ava Sen who practiced singing from their childhoods. His father Swapan Sen sang with emphasis on Mukherjee's songs and also sang in several Bengali movies, besides singing in events. His father used to listen to songs sung by various different artists. However, Sen took his liking in songs of Mukherjee from his childhood. Sen grew up listening to Mukherjee's songs even by never seeing him in-person.

Initially pursuing his studies in computer science, Sen left his studies mid-way following the death of his father Swapan Sen, and joined the family business. After 8 years of spending time in family business, he returned to his singing career, starting his professional singing in 2014. By this time he released music with record labels like Saregama (His Master's Voice or HMV), Hindustan Records, Prime Music and others. He also put out a Rabindra Sangeet album. Sen received no formal singing training.

=== Concerts and performance ===
Sen is considered to be an exponent of Hemanta Mukherjee's music and performs concert tours in various countries such as India, Bangladesh and US. In 2019, Chondoneer, a cultural organization, organized a concert in memory of Mukherjee in Silchar, where he and his wife Anubha Sen sang songs as a tribute to Mukherjee's singing.

In June 2017, Sen went to the Sai Sabhagruha hall in Nagpur, Uttar Pradesh, to sing songs in an event commemorating Hemanta Mukherjee on the invitation of Bengali Association and Bengali Education Society. Shikha Vohra, the daughter of composer Anil Biswas remarked that his vocals compared well with the singing style and voice of Mukherjee. In the event, he sang songs like "Amay Prashna Kare", "Khirki Theke Singhoduar", "Ei Meghla Dine Ekla" and "Oliro Kotha Shune Bakul Hase" alongside a few Hindi songs such as "Janam Se Banjara Hoon" and "Kahin Door Jab Din Dhal Jaye".

In 2018, Sen and other musicians such as Anubha Banerjee provided their support for the restoration of the Boys Anglo Bengali Inter College in Sunderbagh, Lucknow, which was 118-years-old at the time. Sen and Banerjee were cordially invited to perform in the charity event A tribute to legendary singer Hemant Kumar organized by the school authorities, scheduled for November 24, 2018. Regarding the college, Sen said "When I was told that college was facing acute shortage of funds, I decided to do a musical concert to raise money for it." He visited the college in June 2018. Sen and Banerjee performed their music in Ravindralaya.
