= Amay Prashna Kare Neel Dhrubatara =

1969 song by Hemanta Mukherjee

Song by Hemanta Mukhopadhyay

from the album Sera Shilpi Sera Gaan, Vol 1
- Language: Bengali
- English title: The Blue Polar Starts Asks Me a Question
- Genre: Indian pop
- Length: 3:20
- Label: Saregama
- Songwriter: Salil Chowdhury

"Amay Prashna Kare Neel Dhrubatara" (Bengali: আমায় প্রশ্ন করে নীল ধ্রুবতারা) is a Bengali song by Indian playback singer Hemanta Mukhopadhyay. It was released in 1969, under the label of Saregama as a later part of the album Sera Shilpi Sera Gaan. The song was written and composed by songwriter Salil Chowdhury. The song's primary topic and title is about the blue polar star in the sky.

== Composition and remake ==
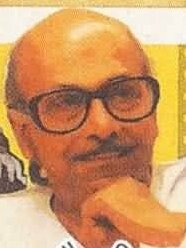
Salil Chowdhury

"Amay Prashna Kare Neel Dhrubatara"
A 30-second sample of the song.

Chowdhury made his debut in the music industry with the song "Runner" or "Ranar" by composing its music. The lyrics were written by Bengali poet Sukanta Bhattacharya and the song was sung by Hemanta Mukherjee in 1950. Salilda and Mukherjee collaborated in the following years by producing new lyrics under record labels like Saregama. (Note: Two same sources: Jha, Subhash K (November 19, 2023). "Hemant Kumar's Historic Fallout With Salil Choudhary". Times Now.; Jha, Subhash K. (August 10, 2020). "Shocking untold story: How singer-composer Hemant Kumar fell out with composer Salil Chowdhury". National Herald.)

"Amay Prashna Kare Neel Dhrubatara" was written and composed by Salil Chowdhury, which he gave Hemanta Mukhopadhyay to sing in 1969. He intended on composing a Hindi version of the song after the Bengali version was released. Hemanta become informed about the re-adaptation, and thought Salil Chowdhury would give the Hindi version to him for recording. Later, the Hindi song, titled "Kahin Door Jab Din Dhal Jaye" was penned by lyricist Yogesh and released in the 1971 film Anand. It was composed by Chowdhury and sung by Indian playback singer Mukesh. However, the original singer Hemanta Mukherjee expressed negative feedback when Chowdhury handed the song to Mukesh.

The cultural organization Nibedan featured its singer Anisur Rahman Sinha in an event named Matha Noto Kore Dao in October 2022, where he sang the song. On August 20, 2022, Bangladeshi singer Bappa Mazumder released a cover version of the song with modified lyrics by Partha Barua originally from Salil Chowdhury's song.

== Reception ==
Devojyoti Mishra of Anandabazar commented that the song begins in a three-dimensional rhythm, like a group of young people had gone out on bicycles and came to a stop by a road bend in front of a large waterfall. He notes that the prelude of the song starts in the rhythm of "স গ র স ধ নি". He states the song's vocals to then have music in a four-dimensional rhythm. He says that the tune was used in the Hindi film Anand, with a different prelude and interlude, in a sad tone to express of life.
