= The Other Way =

2018 Indian short film by Imtiaz Ali

- Directed by: Imtiaz Ali
- Written by: Imtiaz Ali
- Produced by: Rajesh Sharma
- Starring: Pavail Gulati; Shreya Chaudhary
- Cinematography: Rajesh Shukla
- Edited by: Manish Jaitly
- Music by: Piyush Kanojia
- Production company: Window Seat Films
- Distributed by: Royal Stag Barrel Select Large Short Films
- Release date: 20 March 2018
- Running time: 14 minutes
- Country: India
- Language: Hindi

The Other Way is a 2018 Indian Hindi-language drama short film written and directed by Imtiaz Ali. Produced under the banner of Window Seat Films, it stars Pavail Gulati and Shreya Chaudhary playing the lead roles. It was released for streaming on 20 March 2018 in YouTube.

== Cast ==
- Pavail Gulati as Arjun
- Shreya Chaudhary as Rewa
- Hitesh Arora
- Aarushi Sharma
- Lekha Prajapati
- Ashish Pandey
- Vaishnavi Andhale

== Reception ==
The film was reviewed by Subhash K. Jha for Hindustan Times and Sampada Sharma for The Indian Express.
