= Achint Thakkar =

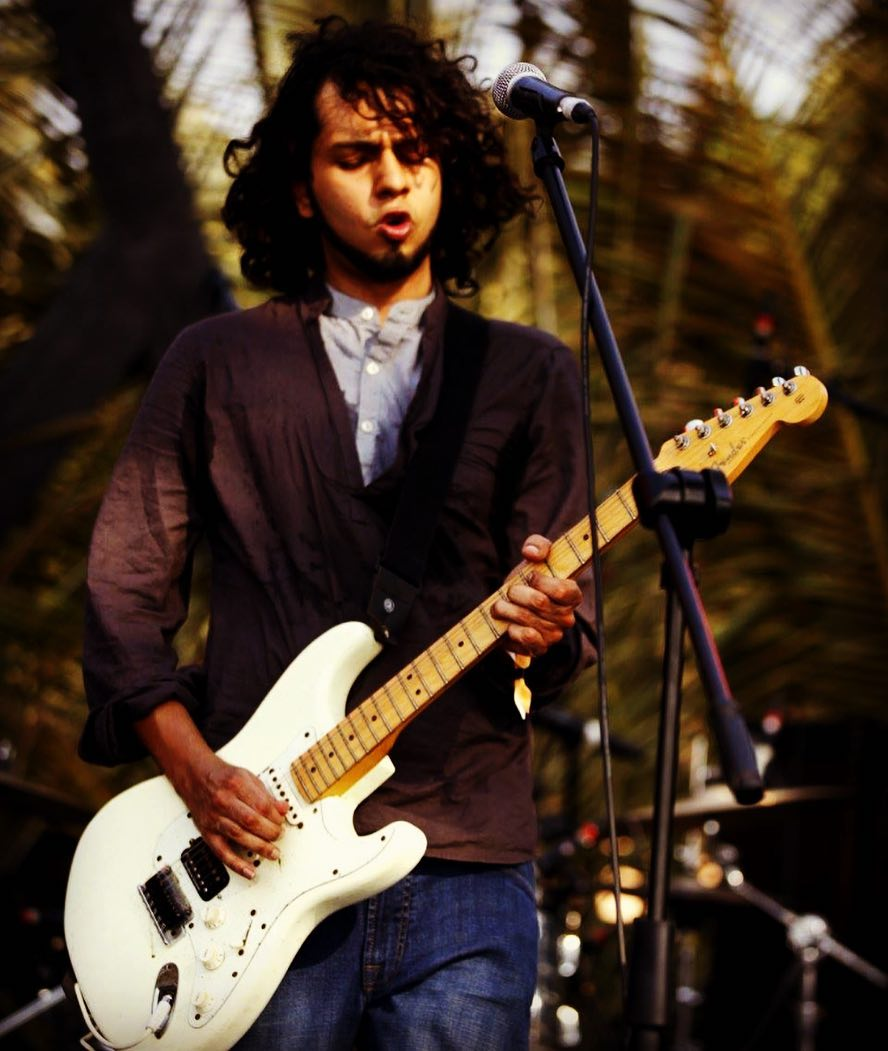
- Thakkar performing at a music festival in 2016

Background information
- Born: 19 February 1990 (age 36); Mumbai, India
- Origin: India
- Occupation: Composer
- Years active: 2015–present
- Website: www.achintthakkar.com

Achint Thakkar is an Indian composer from Mumbai. Achint composed music for the show Scam 1992 – The Harshad Mehta Story (2020). For his work in the 2024 films Jigra and Mr. & Mrs. Mahi, he received the Filmfare R. D. Burman Award.

== Career ==
Achint released his debut album, titled Shalimar, in 2015. In 2018, he released Achint & The Khan Brothers, an album featuring Rajasthani folk singers The Khan Brothers. This album consists of arrangements fusing electronic tempos and folk singing.

Achint collaborated with Hansal Mehta and Jai Mehta to score Scam 1992: The Harshad Mehta Story. The album's soundtrack was released on Sony Liv in 2020. His next scoring project was Rocket Boys, directed by Abhay Pannu and produced by Siddharth Roy Kapur with Monisha Advani, and Madhu Bhojwani under the banners Roy Kapur Films and Emmay Entertainment, respectively.

In 2021, Achint worked with director Vasan Bala for the first time to score Monica, O My Darling, a Netflix original.

Achint also composed and produced "Khalasi", a song for the first season of Coke Studio Bharat. The lyrics for this song were written by Saumya Joshi, and it was sung by Aditya Gadhvi and Achint. This song became viral and was praised by the Indian Prime Minister Narendra Modi. "Khalasi" won a bronze at the 71st Cannes Lions Festival of Creativity for diversity and inclusion in the music category.

Achint, working with Nirmit Shah, composed and produced "Rangaara", which celebrates the spirit of Gujarat. Aditya Gadhvi and Falguni Pathak collaborated to provide vocals, with lyrics written by Saumya Joshi.

Achint and Vasan collaborated again on his latest theatrical release, Jigra. The lyrics for the soundtrack were written by Varun Grover. "Tenu Sang Rakhna", a track from the film, was sung by Arijit Singh and Anumita Nadesan.

== Works ==
=== TV series ===
| Year | Title | Note | Refs. |
|---|---|---|---|
| 2020 | Scam 1992 – The Harshad Mehta Story | Original Soundtrack | |
| 2022 | Rocket Boys | Original Soundtrack | |
| 2023 | Rocket Boys (season 2) | Original Soundtrack | |
| 2023 | Scoop | Original Soundtrack | |
| 2024 | Lootere | Original Soundtrack | |
| 2026 | Matka King | Music supervisor | |

=== Film ===
| Year | Title | Note | Refs. |
|---|---|---|---|
| 2022 | Monica, O My Darling | All songs | |
| 2023 | Kho Gaye Hum Kahan | One song: "Title track" | |
| 2024 | Mr. & Mrs. Mahi | One song: "Junoon Hai" | |
| 2024 | Jigra | All songs except for "Chal Kudiye" | |

=== Other ===
| Year | Title | Note | Refs. |
|---|---|---|---|
| 2015 | Shalimar | Album | |
| 2015 | "Piya Basanti (Redux)" | Single | |
| 2018 | Achint & The Khan Brothers | Album | |
| 2021 | "Gaye Vo Kahan?" | Single for stand-up comedy special Team Animals by Abhishek Upmanyu | |
| 2023 | "Khalasi" | Single | |
| 2023 | "Papa Gaye" | Single for stand-up comedy special Jealous of Sabziwala by Abhishek Upmanyu | |
| 2024 | "Anjaane" | Single | |
| 2024 | "Jugni" (Maati S1) | Single performed with Vishal Dadlani & Varun Grover | |

== Awards ==
| Year | Award | Nominated work | Category | Result | Ref |
|---|---|---|---|---|---|
| 2021 | Filmfare OTT Awards | Scam 1992 – The Harshad Mehta Story | Best Original Soundtrack (Series) | Won | |
| 2021 | Filmfare OTT Awards | Scam 1992 – The Harshad Mehta Story | Best Background Music (Series) | Won | |
| 2022 | Filmfare OTT Awards | Rocket Boys | Best Original Soundtrack (Series) | Nominated | |
| 2022 | Filmfare OTT Awards | Rocket Boys | Best Background Music (Series) | Nominated | |
| 2023 | Filmfare OTT Awards | Rocket Boys (Season 2) | Best Original Soundtrack (Series) | Nominated | |
| 2023 | Filmfare OTT Awards | Rocket Boys (Season 2) | Best Background Music (Series) | Nominated | |
| 2023 | Filmfare OTT Awards | Monica, O My Darling | Best Background Music (Web Original Film) | Won | |
| 2025 | IIFA Awards | Jigra | Best Background Score | Won | |
| 2025 | Filmfare Awards | Jigra | R. D. Burman Award | Won | |
| 2025 | Filmfare Awards | Mr. & Mrs. Mahi | R. D. Burman Award | Won | |
