= Vasan Bala =

Indian film director and screenwriter

- Born: 20 July 1978 (age 48); Mumbai, Maharashtra, India
- Occupations: Film director; screenwriter

Vasan Bala is an Indian film director and screenwriter known for his work in Hindi cinema. He wrote the scripts for the period crime drama Bombay Velvet (2015) and the psychological thriller Raman Raghav 2.0 (2016). Bala made his directorial debut with the crime thriller Peddlers in 2012, which earned him a nomination for the Golden Camera Award at Cannes. He's also worked as an assistant director on films like Dev.D (2009), Gulaal (2009), and Trishna (2011). As a dialogue writer, he's contributed to The Lunchbox (2013) and Rukh (2017). In 2019, he released the film Mard Ko Dard Nahi Hota. His latest directorial was Dharma Productions' Jigra (2024), starring Alia Bhatt.

== Early life ==
Bala hails from Mumbai, India. After spending several years working at a bank, he decided to leave his job and pursue a career as a director. He gained hands-on experience by learning directly from renowned filmmakers Anurag Kashyap and Michael Winterbottom, before eventually directing his debut feature film, Peddlers (2012).

== Career ==
Bala began his film career working in close collaboration with directors like Anurag Kashyap. He initially gained recognition as a screenwriter for Raman Raghav 2.0 (2016) and Bombay Velvet (2015).

His directorial debut, Peddlers (2012), was screened at the Cannes Film Festival. The film dealt with themes of urban isolation and the struggles of the youth in Mumbai, mixing crime and drama. Bala also directed the sketch parody, "Every Bollywood Party Song", for the creative agency All India Bakchod, starring actor Irrfan Khan, which was released on YouTube.

His major breakthrough as a director came with Mard Ko Dard Nahi Hota (2018), a quirky action-comedy about a young man who feels no pain due to a rare medical condition. The film was well-received for its homage to martial arts films and its unique storytelling, winning the People's Choice Award at the Toronto International Film Festival.

In 2022, Bala directed Monica, O My Darling, a neo-noir crime comedy. Known for its humor and retro feel, the film features a mix of Bollywood nostalgia and intricate murder mystery, and was lauded for its style and storytelling.

In 2024, he directed Dharma Productions' Jigra, starring Alia Bhatt. The film received mixed reviews from critics and ended up being commercially unsuccessful, for which Bala held himself responsible.

== Filmography ==
=== Feature films ===
Year	Title	Director	Writer
2012	Peddlers	Yes	Yes
2015	Bombay Velvet	No	Yes
2017	Raman Raghav 2.0	No	Yes
2017	Rukh	No	Yes
2019	Mard Ko Dard Nahi Hota	Yes	Yes
2021	83	No	Yes
2022	Monica, O My Darling	Yes	Yes
2024	Jigra	Yes	Yes

=== As an actor ===
- Aamir (2008)
