= List of accolades received by Gully Boy =

Awards and nominations
Award	Won	Nominated
Screen Awards	12	13
Zee Cine Awards	9	10
Filmfare Awards	13	19
Mirchi Music Awards	1	9
IIFA Awards	6	17
Jagran Film Festival	2	2
Bucheon International Fantastic Film Festival	1	1
Indian Film Festival of Melbourne	1	4
AACTA Awards	0	1
Asian Film Awards	1	3
Totals	43	76
Footnotes

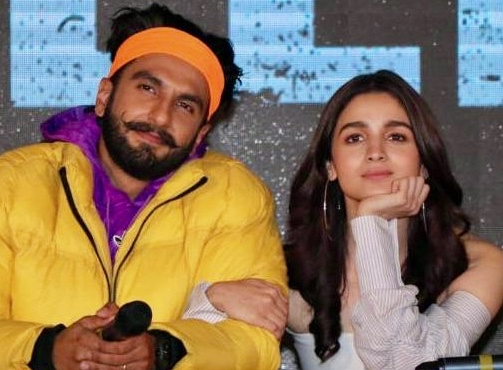
Ranveer Singh (left) and Alia Bhatt (right) won most of the Best Actor and Best Actress awards across various Indian awards.

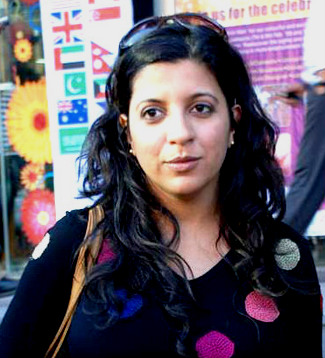
Zoya Akhtar won several Best Director awards for the film

This is the full list of accolades received by Gully Boy. In the 65th Filmfare Awards the film won 13 awards at the show, the most awards for a single film in a year, has broken the record of Black, which won 11 awards in 2006. The film was also India's official entry to 92nd Academy Awards for the Best International feature film category though it was not nominated.

== Indian awards ==
Date of ceremony	Award	Category	Recipient(s) and nominee(s)	Result	Ref.
8 December 2019	Screen Awards	Best Film	Gully Boy	Won	
8 December 2019	Screen Awards	Best Music Director (Shared with Kabir Singh)	Gully Boy	Won	
8 December 2019	Screen Awards	Best Production Design	Gully Boy	Won	
8 December 2019	Screen Awards	Best Director	Zoya Akhtar	Won	
8 December 2019	Screen Awards	Best Actor	Ranveer Singh	Won	
8 December 2019	Screen Awards	Entertainer of the Year (Shared with Shahid Kapoor – Kabir Singh)	Ranveer Singh	Won	
8 December 2019	Screen Awards	Best Actress	Alia Bhatt	Won	
8 December 2019	Screen Awards	Best Supporting Actor	Vijay Varma	Nominated	
8 December 2019	Screen Awards	Best Male Debut	Siddhant Chaturvedi	Won	
8 December 2019	Screen Awards	Best Lyricist	Divine & Ankur Tewari for "Apna Time Aayega"	Won	
8 December 2019	Screen Awards	Best Dialogue	Vijay Maurya	Won	
8 December 2019	Screen Awards	Best Cinematography	Jay Oza	Won	
8 December 2019	Screen Awards	Best Costume Design	Arjun Bhasin; Poornamrata Singh	Won	
15 February 2020	Filmfare Awards	Best Film	Gully Boy – Excel Entertainment, Tiger Baby Films	Won	
15 February 2020	Filmfare Awards	Best Director	Zoya Akhtar	Won	
15 February 2020	Filmfare Awards	Best Story	Zoya Akhtar & Reema Kagti	Nominated	
15 February 2020	Filmfare Awards	Best Screenplay	Zoya Akhtar & Reema Kagti	Won	
15 February 2020	Filmfare Awards	Best Dialogue	Vijay Maurya	Won	
15 February 2020	Filmfare Awards	Best Actor	Ranveer Singh	Won	
15 February 2020	Filmfare Awards	Best Actress	Alia Bhatt	Won	
15 February 2020	Filmfare Awards	Best Supporting Actor	Vijay Varma	Nominated	
15 February 2020	Filmfare Awards	Best Supporting Actor	Siddhant Chaturvedi	Won	
15 February 2020	Filmfare Awards	Best Male Debut	Siddhant Chaturvedi	Nominated	
15 February 2020	Filmfare Awards	Best Supporting Actress	Amruta Subhash	Won	
15 February 2020	Filmfare Awards	Best Music Director (Shared with Kabir Singh)	Gully Boy	Won	
15 February 2020	Filmfare Awards	Best Lyricist	Divine & Ankur Tewari for "Apna Time Aayega"	Won	
15 February 2020	Filmfare Awards	Best Editing	Nitin Baid	Nominated	
15 February 2020	Filmfare Awards	Best Art Direction	Suzanne Caplan Merwanji	Won	
15 February 2020	Filmfare Awards	Best Cinematography	Jay Oza	Won	
15 February 2020	Filmfare Awards	Best Sound Design	Ayush Ahuja	Nominated	
15 February 2020	Filmfare Awards	Best Background Score	Karsh Kale & The Salvage Audio Collective	Won	
15 February 2020	Filmfare Awards	Best Costume Design	Arjun Bhasin & Poornamrata Singh	Nominated	
19 February 2020	Mirchi Music Awards	Song of The Year	"Apna Time Aayega"	Nominated	
19 February 2020	Mirchi Music Awards	Listeners' Choice Song of the Year	"Apna Time Aayega"	Nominated	
19 February 2020	Mirchi Music Awards	Album of The Year	Gully Boy	Nominated	
19 February 2020	Mirchi Music Awards	Listeners' Choice Album of the Year	Gully Boy	Nominated	
19 February 2020	Mirchi Music Awards	Trendsetter Album of the year	Gully Boy	Won	
19 February 2020	Mirchi Music Awards	Male Vocalist of The Year	Ranveer Singh & Divine for "Apna Time Aayega"	Nominated	
19 February 2020	Mirchi Music Awards	Upcoming Male Vocalist of The Year	Divine, Naezy & Ranveer Singh for "Mere Gully Mein"	Nominated	
19 February 2020	Mirchi Music Awards	Upcoming Lyricist of The Year	Spitfire for "Asli Hip Hop"	Nominated	
19 February 2020	Mirchi Music Awards	Upcoming Lyricist of The Year	Divine & Naezy for "Mere Gully Mein"	Nominated	
19 February 2020	Mirchi Music Awards	Upcoming Music Composer of The Year	Divine, Naezy & Sez on the Beat for "Mere Gully Mein"	Nominated	
13 March 2020	Zee Cine Awards	Best Film	Gully Boy	Won	
13 March 2020	Zee Cine Awards	Best Director	Zoya Akhtar	Won	
13 March 2020	Zee Cine Awards	Best Actor – Male	Ranveer Singh	Won	
13 March 2020	Zee Cine Awards	Best Actor (Critics) – Male	Ranveer Singh	Nominated	
13 March 2020	Zee Cine Awards	Best Actor – Female	Alia Bhatt	Won	
13 March 2020	Zee Cine Awards	Best Male Debut	Siddhant Chaturvedi	Won	
13 March 2020	Zee Cine Awards	Best Cinematography	Jay Oza	Won	
13 March 2020	Zee Cine Awards	Best Editing	Nitin Baid	Won	
13 March 2020	Zee Cine Awards	Best On-screen Pair	Ranveer Singh & Siddhant Chaturvedi	Won	
13 March 2020	Zee Cine Awards	Song Of The Year	"Apna Time Aayega"	Won	
28 March 2020	Critics' Choice Film Awards	Best Film (Hindi)	Gully Boy	Won	
28 March 2020	Critics' Choice Film Awards	Best Director (Hindi)	Zoya Akhtar	Won	
28 March 2020	Critics' Choice Film Awards	Best Actor (Hindi)	Ranveer Singh	Won	
27-29 November 2020	International Indian Film Academy Awards	Best Film	Gully Boy	Nominated	
27-29 November 2020	International Indian Film Academy Awards	Best Director	Zoya Akhtar	Nominated	
27-29 November 2020	International Indian Film Academy Awards	Best Actor	Ranveer Singh	Nominated	
27-29 November 2020	International Indian Film Academy Awards	Best Actress	Alia Bhatt	Won	
27-29 November 2020	International Indian Film Academy Awards	Best Supporting Actor	Vijay Varma	Nominated	
27-29 November 2020	International Indian Film Academy Awards	Best Supporting Actor	Siddhant Chaturvedi	Won	
27-29 November 2020	International Indian Film Academy Awards	Best Supporting Actress	Amruta Subhash	Nominated	
27-29 November 2020	International Indian Film Academy Awards	Best Music Director	Gully Boy	Nominated	
27-29 November 2020	International Indian Film Academy Awards	Best Story	Zoya Akhtar, Reema Kagti	Won	
27-29 November 2020	International Indian Film Academy Awards	Best Lyricist	Divine & Ankur Tewari for "Apna Time Aayega"	Nominated	
27-29 November 2020	International Indian Film Academy Awards	Best Lyricist	Divine & Naezy for "Mere Gully Mein"	Nominated	
27-29 November 2020	International Indian Film Academy Awards	Best Male Playback Singer	Divine, Naezy & Ranveer Singh for "Mere Gully Mein"	Nominated	
27-29 November 2020	International Indian Film Academy Awards	Best Female Playback Singer	Jasleen Royal for "Jahan Tu Chala"	Nominated	
27-29 November 2020	International Indian Film Academy Awards	Best Female Playback Singer	Vibha Saraf for "Kab Se Kab Tak"	Nominated	
27-29 November 2020	International Indian Film Academy Awards	Best Cinematography	Jay Oza	Won	
27-29 November 2020	International Indian Film Academy Awards	Best Dialogue	Vijay Maurya	Won	
27-29 November 2020	International Indian Film Academy Awards	Best Editing	Nitin Baid	Won	
29 September 2019	Jagran Film Festival	Best Writing	Gully Boy	Won	
29 September 2019	Jagran Film Festival	Best Music	Gully Boy	Won	

== International awards ==
Date of ceremony	Award	Category	Recipient(s) and nominee(s)	Result	Ref.
27 June - 7 July 2019	Bucheon International Fantastic Film Festival	NETPAC Award for Best Asian Film	Gully Boy	Won	
8 August 2019	Indian Film Festival of Melbourne	Best Director	Zoya Akhtar	Nominated	
8 August 2019	Indian Film Festival of Melbourne	Best Actor	Ranveer Singh	Nominated	
8 August 2019	Indian Film Festival of Melbourne	Best Actress	Alia Bhatt	Nominated	
8 August 2019	Indian Film Festival of Melbourne	Best Film	Gully Boy	Won	
4 December 2019	AACTA Awards	Best Asian Film	Gully Boy	Nominated	
October 28, 2020	Asian Film Awards	Best Original Music	Karsh Kale, The Salvage Audio Collective	Won	
October 28, 2020	Asian Film Awards	Best Production Design	Suzanne Caplan Merwanji	Nominated	
October 28, 2020	Asian Film Awards	Best Costume Design	Arjun Bhasin, Poornamrita Singh	Nominated	
January 19, 2020	Golden Reel Awards	Outstanding Achievement in Sound Editing for Foreign Language Feature Film	Ayush Ahuja and Nakul Kamte	Nominated	
