= The Archies (film) =

2023 Indian film by Zoya Akhtar

- Official release poster
- Directed by: Zoya Akhtar
- Written by: Story and Screenplay: Ayesha Devitre Dhillon; Reema Kagti; Zoya Akhtar; Dialogues: Farhan Akhtar
- Based on: Characters by Archie Comics
- Produced by: Zoya Akhtar; Reema Kagti; Sharad Devarajan; Jon Goldwater
- Starring: Agastya Nanda; Khushi Kapoor; Suhana Khan; Vedang Raina; Mihir Ahuja; Aditi "Dot" Saigal; Yuvraj Menda; Suhas Ahuja
- Cinematography: Nikos Andritsakis
- Edited by: Nitin Baid
- Music by: Songs: Shankar–Ehsaan–Loy; Ankur Tewari; The Islanders; Aditi "Dot" Saigal; Background score: Shankar–Ehsaan–Loy; Jim Satya
- Production companies: Riverdale Productions; Graphic India; Tiger Baby Films
- Distributed by: Netflix
- Release dates: 22 November 2023 (Goa); 7 December 2023
- Running time: 144 minutes
- Country: India
- Language: Hindi
- Budget: est. ₹400 million

The Archies is a 2023 Indian Hindi-language teen musical film directed by Zoya Akhtar, who co-produced it with Reema Kagti under Tiger Baby Films, and Sharad Devarajan under Graphic India. The film is a live-action adaptation of "The Archies," a fictional rock band who appeared in the 1960s animated cartoon, The Archie Show (with characters drawn from Archie Comics). The film stars Agastya Nanda, Khushi Kapoor, Suhana Khan, Vedang Raina, Mihir Ahuja, Aditi Saigal, and Yuvraj Menda.

The Archies had been under development since March 2018, before Akhtar's involvement as the director and producer of the film (which was officially announced in November 2021). Following an extensive pre-production and casting process, The Archies was shot from April to December 2022 in two concurrent schedules across Ooty, Mauritius, and Mumbai. Nikos Andritsakis handled the film's cinematography, with the original score composed by Shankar–Ehsaan–Loy and Jim Satya. The former also composed the songs with Ankur Tewari, The Islanders and Saigal.

The Archies premiered at the 54th International Film Festival of India on 22 November 2023, and was released on Netflix on 7 December 2023 to mixed reviews from critics and audiences. At the 2024 Filmfare OTT Awards, The Archies received 5 nominations, and won 2 awards, including Best Male Debut in a Web Original Film (for Raina).

== Plot ==
Set in the fictional Anglo-Indian community of Riverdale in 1964 India, Archie, Betty, Ronnie, Reggie, Jughead, Ethel, Dilton, Moose, and Midge struggle to save the historic "Green Park," that is slated for destruction because it is a proposed site for building a hotel.

== Cast ==
- Agastya Nanda as Archibald "Archie" Andrews
- Khushi Kapoor as Elizabeth "Betty" Cooper
- Suhana Khan as Veronica "Ronnie" Lodge
- Vedang Raina as Reginald "Reggie" Mantle
- Mihir Ahuja as Jughead Jones
- Aditi "DOT" Saigal as Ethel Muggs
- Yuvraj Menda as Dilton Doiley
- Rudra Mahuvakar as Moose Mason
- Santana Roach as Midge Klump
- Diya Gupta as Cheryl Blossom
- Suhaas Ahuja as Fred Andrews, Archie's father
- Tara Sharma as Mary Andrews, Archie's mother
- Satyajit Sharma as Hal Cooper, Betty's father
- Koel Purie as Alice Cooper, Betty's mother
- Alyy Khan as Hiram Lodge, Veronica's father
- Kamal Sidhu as Hermione Lodge, Veronica's mother
- Luke Kenny as Ricky Mantle, Reggie's father
- Dimpy Fadhya as Vicky Mantle
- Darshan Gokani as Forsythe Jones, Jughead's father
- Bambi Juneja as Gladys Jones
- Neeraj Menda as Kenny Doiley
- Janvi Menda as Tanya Doiley
- Deven Khote as Mr. Waldo Weatherbee
- Salone Mehta as Ms. Geraldine Grundy
- Nikhil Kapoor as Pop Tate
- Asif Ali Beg as Smithers, Hiram Lodge's butler
- Samedhika Datt as Lynn, teenage girl with Reggie in car.
- Vinay Pathak as H. Dawson
- Delnaaz Irani as Pam
- James Alter as James Gomes
- Pooja Sarup as Mrs Otters
- Ashish Sawhny as Roger Moore
- Sahil Jaffery as Nigel Timmins
- Avan Contractor as Miss Mathias
- Dierdree Wright as Miss Misquitta
- Ashok Banthia as Uncle Benny
- Farhan Akhtar in a voiceover as Ben Andrews, Archie's uncle

== Production ==
=== Development ===
In March 2018, Variety reported that an Indian adaptation of Archie Comics under the supervision of Sharad Devarajan, CEO of Graphic India, as a feature film was in development and would feature the fictional music group with an Indian cast. Though there was no further development, in March 2021, Zoya Akhtar was reported to helm the film. Consequently, in November, the project was officially confirmed as a Netflix original film, with Akhtar also directing and producing along with Reema Kagti under the banner of Tiger Baby Films. Although the company had previously produced Gully Boy (2019), this would mark their first independent project.

Akhtar, being a self-confessed fan of the comics, wanted the adaptation to be nostalgic and familiar with the comic fans, but also to the millennial generations who had not been familiar with the comics. She wanted to take themes that would resonate with them and blend with the nostalgia, describing it as a film "rooted in reality but being dreamy as well." Many enthusiasts compared the aesthetics of the film with that of the cottage-core genre. Reema Kagti also opined on Akhtar's comments on wanting the film to be relevant with those who had not read the comics.

In an interview for Vogue, Akhtar said that she initially met Devarajan for a different comic adaptation, and during their conversation she expressed her interest in the Archie comics, whose adaptation had been owned and leased to Netflix. Devarajan contacted the executives of Netflix and asked for her involvement on directing the film, to which she eventually agreed.

"There was a culture of music and fashion and food that was important to them. There was a culture of dating. There was the history of how they were placed in India... the hill stations, the architecture. A lot of the values were similar. There was a lot about the community that lent itself to this story."

— Zoya Akhtar

The Archies was jointly written by Akhtar, Kagti and Ayesha Devitre Dhillon. In order to keep the characters as original to the comics, Akhtar set the storyline in the Anglo-Indian community, where she and her creative team pulled down several references and met people within the community requesting old photographs for imitating their style. The film is set in the 1964, the beginning of the hippie culture and the music of the Beatles and Bob Dylan. Akhtar said, "There was an idealism that we will make the world a better place. That was the era where they believed that they could change the world. There was a bit of rebellion, peace and love. It was also the era of rock ‘n’ roll. So, that whole feeling of that era is what we wanted to bring in."

=== Pre-production ===
The Archies marks the debut of Shah Rukh Khan's daughter Suhana Khan (Veronica), the late Sridevi and Boney Kapoor's younger daughter Khushi Kapoor (Betty), and Amitabh Bachchan's grandson Agastya Nanda (Archie). In May 2022, an announcement video for the film revealed the other principal cast members, Mihir Ahuja (Jughead), Aditi "Dot" Saigal (Ethel), Yuvraj Menda (Dilton), and Vedang Raina (Reggie). Except for Ahuja, the other three also made their debut with this film.

The casting garnered criticism owing to nepotism as three of the principal members were from film families. Critics also said the principal characters being light-skinned felt inauthentic to that period. Akhtar rebutted the criticisms, saying that many Indians are light-skinned. Also addressing the nepotism issue, Akhtar said that as the comics only described the love triangle between the principal characters (Archie, Betty and Veronica), it was falsely mentioned to have three leads. However, the film featured seven lead actors.

Nanda, Suhana and Khushi gave auditions before their selection. Apart from other principal cast members in the background—Saigal was a singer, whereas Raina was a model and musician who had not thought about acting, Suhana and Khushi had an interest in acting; the former had starred in a few short films. Saigal initially met Akhtar for music, for which she asked her to audition, and Menda was cast after Zoya found him on Instagram. The cast members underwent acting workshops to get into their characters.

On their acting performance, Akhtar further said, "they all have a particular comfort in front of the camera, a particular kind of confidence that comes through. You cannot tell it is their first time. They are not awkward in themselves and in their skin."

=== Production ===
The test shoot for the film began in March 2022, with the presence of the principal cast. On 18 April 2022, principal photography for the film began with its first schedule commencing in The Lawrence School, Lovedale near Ooty. The schedule was completed within two months. In July 2022, the crew returned to Mumbai for filming the second schedule, with a skating song under the choreography of Ganesh Hegde being shot. At the end of the month, another song sequence choreographed by Bosco–Caesar and few scenes were shot at the Royal Palms in Mumbai for 10 days, which was followed by a subsequent two-month schedule break. Filming resumed in Mumbai in October 2022, across several locations and concluded on 19 December 2022. Many scenes were also filmed in Mauritius. Throughout the schedule, the cast and crew adhered to safety regulations because of the COVID-19 pandemic.

== Music ==
The film's soundtrack was composed by Ankur Tewari, The Islanders, Aditi "Dot" Saigal and Shankar–Ehsaan–Loy, while the lyrics were written by Javed Akhtar, Tewari and Saigal. The soundtrack was released by Sony Music India on 25 November 2023.

== Marketing ==
The first poster look and teaser announcing the film's cast was released on 14 May 2022. As a part of the promotions, the film's cast members conducted a dance performance at the Tudum 2023 fan event held in São Paulo, Brazil on 17 June 2023. The same day, the film's teaser trailer was launched at the event, and was later uploaded to social media platforms the following day. In late-June 2023, the team created an advertisement of a plane flying over the Gateway of India promoting the film's release, which had been created using visual effects.

Throughout August and October 2023, Akhtar revealed the character promos and posters of the film's cast, through Instagram. Post the announcement of the release, on 30 August 2023, a huge billboard was set up on the Western Express Highway in Mumbai, indicating the countdown to the number of days to its release. The official trailer was released on 9 November 2023.

The cast members visited Hindu College, Shri Ram College of Commerce and Miranda House in Delhi on 22–23 November 2023, and further participated at a promotional event held in Film City, Mumbai on 25 November. They also participated in the fifteenth season of the game show Kaun Banega Crorepati on 6 December 2023. In addition, the team collaborated with several brands to launch merchandise as a part of promotions, including Starbucks, BoAt, Vistara, Flipkart, Maybelline, Skybags, WhatsApp and Tinder.

== Release ==
The film premiered at the 54th International Film Festival of India on 22 November 2023. The film's premiere was held at the Nita Mukesh Ambani Cultural Centre on 5 December.

It was released on Netflix on 7 December 2023.

== Reception ==
The Archies received mixed reviews from critics in India, while the reviews leaned towards generally positive overseas, with praise for Akhtar's direction, the production values and the soundtrack, but criticism for the screenplay and the performances. On the review aggregator website Rotten Tomatoes, 63% of 27 critics' reviews are positive, with an average rating of 6/10. Metacritic, which uses a weighted average, assigned the film a score of 66 out of 100, based on 6 critics, indicating "generally favorable" reviews. The film received mixed reviews from audiences.

Amy Nicholson of The New York Times wrote that "this inessential Bollywood-tinged fantasia is two and a half hours of soda shops, chaste dates, candy-colored petticoats, and athletic musical numbers." Udita Jhunjhunwala of Scroll.in termed it a "good-looking nostalgia piece," but dismissed the dialogues as occasionally "banal"; she considered the "real stars" to be the "production design, costumes, cinematography, art direction, choreography and locations." NDTV's Saibal Chatterjee labelled it "a beguiling oddity in style, substance and spirit", adding that the "pat and predictable" film "flows without a hitch and articulates its points with a refreshing lightness of touch." A critic from Bollywood Hungama awarded the film 4/5 stars and wrote, "The Archies is a fine entertainer that will get a whopping viewership on Netflix due to the fascinating setting, kids-friendly and family-friendly theme, style, music, message and above all, the excitement of watching the debut of the most talked about star kids in recent times."

Among the ensemble cast of newcomers, Sukanya Verma of Rediff.com deemed Suhana Khan and Vedang Raina "ready-to-ship star material." Terming the film's cast as "Nepotism Central," Shubhra Gupta of The Indian Express believed that, "Khushi has more verve than both Agastya and Suhana, but I will also say that the latter did grow on me." Conversely, Jhunjunwala found Khushi Kapoor a "bit stiff in her dance moves and speech" and Agastya Nanda "likeable though a touch diffident in his timbre." Sneha Bengani of CNBC TV18 dismissed Nanda, Khan, and Kapoor as "wooden" and "too plastic."

== Accolades ==
Award	Date of the ceremony	Category	Recipients	Result	Ref.
Filmfare OTT Awards	1 December 2024	Best Male Debut in a Web Original Film	Vedang Raina	Won	
Filmfare OTT Awards	1 December 2024	Best Background Music (Web Original Film)	Shankar–Ehsaan–Loy and Jim Satya	Nominated	
Filmfare OTT Awards	1 December 2024	Best Original Soundtrack (Web Original Film)	Shankar Ehsaan Loy, Ankur Tewari, DOT and The Islanders	Nominated	
Filmfare OTT Awards	1 December 2024	Best Production Design (Web Original Film)	Suzanne Caplan Merwanji	Won	
Filmfare OTT Awards	1 December 2024	Best Cinematographer (Web Original Film)	Nikos Andritsakis	Nominated	
Filmfare OTT Awards	1 December 2024	Best Sound Design (Web Original Film)	Pranav Shukla	Nominated	
