= Superboys of Malegaon =

- Theatrical release poster
- Directed by: Reema Kagti
- Written by: Varun Grover
- Based on: Supermen of Malegaon by Faiza Ahmad Khan
- Produced by: Zoya Akhtar; Reema Kagti; Farhan Akhtar; Ritesh Sidhwani
- Starring: Adarsh Gourav; Riddhi Kumar; Vineet Kumar Singh; Shashank Arora; Anuj Singh Duhan
- Cinematography: Swapnil S. Sonawane
- Edited by: Anand Subaya
- Music by: Sachin-Jigar
- Production companies: Excel Entertainment; Tiger Baby Films
- Distributed by: Amazon MGM Studios
- Release dates: 13 September 2024 (TIFF); 28 February 2025
- Running time: 131 minutes
- Country: India
- Language: Hindi
- Box office: est. ₹5.35 crore

Superboys of Malegaon is a 2024 Indian Hindi-language coming-of-age drama film directed by Reema Kagti and written by Varun Grover. Inspired by the 2012 documentary Supermen of Malegaon, it is based on the life of Nasir Shaikh and other amateur filmmakers in the small town of Malegaon. The film stars Adarsh Gourav, Vineet Kumar Singh, Shashank Arora, and Anuj Singh Duhan.

The film premiered at the 2024 Toronto International Film Festival on 13 September 2024. It was theatrically released in India on 28 February 2025, and received positive reviews from critics.

Superboys of Malegaon was selected as the Opening Night Film at the 2025 National Indian Film Festival of Australia (NIFFA), where it was also awarded Best Feature Film.

== Plot ==
In 1997, an aspiring filmmaker Nasir (Adarsh Gourav) along with his friends Farogh (Vineet Kumar Singh), Shafique (Shashank Arora), Irfan, and Akram decide to make a film for their hometown, Malegaon. Farogh, as a writer, had written a storyline based on the iconic movie Sholay. They name their film Malegaon ke Sholay. The film becomes a huge hit, drawing people in large numbers to their movie parlour. Following this, Farogh wants to make a film based on an original storyline but due to his differences in opinion with Nasir and their mutual disagreement to work with each other, he leaves the group and heads for Mumbai.

In 2004, while Nasir becomes well-known for his direction in Malegaon, the other group members are underpaid and barely known to the general public. This eventually leads to the original splitting up of the original troupe as Irfan and Akram also leave the group citing that they deserve more recognition for the roles they played in Nasir's films. A series of bad decisions and his failure to make successful films force Nasir to abandon film making and start a restaurant.

In 2010, Shafique gets diagnosed with cancer. Nasir, along with Imran and Akram contribute to pay for his treatment, but the illness resurfaces again. Nasir reunites the original group of friends to make a new film with Farogh writing the script and Shafique playing the leading role. The film, titled Superman of Malegaon, fulfills Shafique's desire to become a well known actor. The movie ends with Shafique watching the film, bursting into tears watching himself as Superman soaring above the skies of Malegaon, representing the Malegaon Superhero.

== Cast ==
- Adarsh Gourav as Nasir
- Vineet Kumar Singh as Farogh
- Shashank Arora as Shafique
- Anuj Singh Duhan as Akram
- Riddhi Kumar as Mallika
- Saqib Ayub as Irfan
- Gyanendra Tripathi as Nihal
- Muskkaan Jaferi as Shabeena
- Anmol Kajani as Nadeem
- Manjiri Pupala as Trupti
- Pallav Singh as Aleem
- Abhinav Grover as Raju

== Release ==
Superboys of Malegaon debuted on 13 September in the World Premieres section of the 2024 Toronto International Film Festival Gala program. The film was released in cinemas on 28 February 2025. It was made available to stream on Amazon Prime Video after its theatrical run.

== Reception ==
On the review aggregator website Rotten Tomatoes, 87% of 54 critics' reviews are positive, with an average rating of 7.4/10. The website's consensus reads: "A tribute to classic films while being a very good one in itself, Superboys of Malegaon is a charming dramedy that will resonate with anyone who's ever been inspired to pick up a camera." Metacritic, which uses a weighted average, assigned the film a score of 71 out of 100, based on 8 critics, indicating "generally favorable" reviews.

Saibal Chatterjee of NDTV gave 4 stars out of 5 and said that it is “Fuelled by measured performances that blend energy with restraint, the characters and the film are in reach for the sky, while staying firmly rooted to the ground". Shubhra Gupta of The Indian Express rated it 2.5/5 stars and commented that "The film brings Muslim characters back on our radar, breaking away from the tropes of evil terrorists and subservient sidekicks, and giving us those who own the story and drive the narrative." Matt Zoller Seitz of Roger Ebert.com gave 3.5 stars out of 4 and observed that "It is One of the most accessible and entertaining movies about the creative urge that you’ll see." Deepa Gahlot of Rediff.com gave 4 stars out of 5 and wrote in her review that "Superboys of Malegaon is a delight to watch".

Rahul Desai of The Hollywood Reporter India wrote, "I’m happy — and relieved — to note that Superboys of Malegaon not only retains the essence of the story, it also expands the subtext of its telling. It’s the right kind of adaptation: a crowd-pleaser with a heart, a head and a rare cognizance of the world it arrives in. The cast is solid; the script is layered; the pitch is high but not deafening; the visual tone is neat without being (too) sanitize; the soundtrack is perceptive and diverse; the gaze rarely punches down; even its flaws are logical." Rishabh Suri of Hindustan Times gave 4 stars out of 5 and said that "Reema Kagti's film is an ode to cinema peppered with nuanced performances and brilliant technical work." Nandini Ramnath of Scroll.in observed that "Superboys of Malegaon is a perfectly sweet tribute to the power of cinema to inspire other kinds of cinema. While the movie does not go anywhere near Malegaon’s communally-riven history, every major character just happens to be Muslim – a staggering achievement by contemporary standards."

Renuka Vyavahare of The Times of India gave 4.5 stars and said that "Superboys of Malegaon pays a resounding tribute to the oddballs who dream. You may call these people delusional, ambitious or foolhardy. They are all Avengers in their own way, wielding the superpower of resilience, and ability to smile through their pain." Anuj Kumar off The Hindu wrote that "A strong ensemble, led by Adarsh Gourav, combined with writer Varun Grover’s earnest delineation of small-town cinematic ambitions, make Reema Kagti’s ‘Superboys of Malegaon’ an engaging character study of desi dream merchants"
