= Dahaad =

Indian TV series by Reema Kagti

- Genre: Crime; Mystery; Thriller
- Created by: Reema Kagti; Zoya Akhtar
- Screenplay by: Reema Kagti; Ritesh Shah; Zoya Akhtar; Jithin
- Directed by: Reema Kagti; Ruchika Oberoi
- Starring: Sonakshi Sinha; Gulshan Devaiah; Vijay Varma; Sohum Shah
- Music by: Gaurav Raina; Tarana Marwah
- Country of origin: India
- Original language: Hindi
- No. of episodes: 8

Production
- Producers: Ritesh Sidhwani; Zoya Akhtar; Reema Kagti; Farhan Akhtar; Kassim Jagmagia; Angad Dev Singh; Sunitha Ram
- Cinematography: Tanay Satam
- Editors: Anand Subaya; Nitin Baid; Shyam K, Salgonkar
- Production companies: Excel Entertainment; Tiger Baby Films

Original release
- Network: Amazon Prime Video
- Release: 12 May 2023 – present

Dahaad (transl. 'Roar') is a Hindi-language police procedural crime thriller television series created by Reema Kagti and Zoya Akhtar, directed by Kagti and Ruchika Oberoi, and starring Sonakshi Sinha, Gulshan Devaiah, Vijay Varma and Sohum Shah. It is inspired by Mohan Kumar, also known as Cyanide Mohan, a serial killer who preyed on women looking to get married.

Dahaad is the first ever Indian streaming series to premiere at Berlin International film festival, where it competed for Berlinale Series Award. It was released on Amazon Prime Video on 12 May 2023. It received positive reviews from critics. At the 2023 Filmfare OTT Awards, Dahaad won two awards (for Sinha and Varma's performances) from nine nominations. According to IMDb, Dahaad has been renewed for a second season and production is underway.

== Plot ==
In Mandawa, a small village in the state of Rajasthan, Sub-Inspector Anjali Bhaati comes across a case in which twenty-seven women across the state have disappeared without a trace, yet the locals seem unfazed. However, everything changes when Bhaati finds a common thread connecting all the cases, leading her to suspect that a serial killer may be on the loose. This revelation shifts her attention from unexplained disappearances to a well-planned and calculated scheme.

Anjali, in her thirties, rebels against the traditional background of her village, making it difficult for her mother to find a suitable groom. She also faces discrimination due to her caste. However, she remains a strong-headed cop.

Two parallel cases emerge, intertwined by fate. A brother from a scheduled caste reports that his sister is missing. In the other case, inter-caste love blossoms between a villager's daughter and a Muslim man. Anjali and her colleague Devi Singh help the Muslim man escape and focuses on the other case.

She discovers a pattern among the missing women: all of them belonged to lower castes, were aged above 25, unable to marry due to poverty and their families' inability to pay a dowry, and emotionally vulnerable. Tracing each victim's phone number to a previous victim, she realises that the 27 women were all killed the day after they eloped with their lovers. They all died from cyanide poisoning.

While some believe it is the work of a gang, Anjali suspects a lone psychopath. She argues that the killer has adhered to a meticulous plan without making a single mistake. She believes that the participation of a gang would increase the chances of errors, unlike this case.

Anand Swarnakar, a college lecturer with a wife and son, teaches underprivileged children. His wife Vandana has an affair with a coworker named Jai.

Anand's son Kapish finds a phone in his father's van. The police trace it to Anand, leading to his interrogation. No evidence is found, but subsequent clues point to Anand's younger brother Shiv, who is arrested. Discovering that Anand was behind the murders, Shiv aids the police. Anand flees Rajasthan and starts a new life in Goa with Mariam. Anjali and her team arrest him before he can commit another murder.

In the end, Anjali questions Anand's motives for killing innocent women. He justifies his actions, claiming that the women were not innocent and deserved punishment. He belittles Anjali's caste despite her police role and questions her relationship with her boss.

Anjali decides to change her surname back to Meghwal, symbolising her defiance against societal expectations and prejudices.

== Cast ==
- Sonakshi Sinha as SI Anjali Bhaati/Anjali Meghwal
- Gulshan Devaiah as SHO/Inspector Devi Lal Singh
- Vijay Varma as Anand Swarnakar (Based on Cyanide Mohan)
- Sohum Shah as SI Kailash Parghi
- Zoa Morani as Vandana Swarnakar
- Karan Maru as Sajjan Rathore
- Mikhail Gandhi as Harry
- Jayati Bhatia as Devki Bhatti, Anjali's mother
- Kaviraj Laique as Javed Lohar
- Manyuu Doshi as Shiv Swarnakar
- Yogi Singha as Murli
- Sanghmitra Hitaishi as Miriam
- Rajiv Kumar as SP Subhash Binjola
- Ratnabali Bhattacharjee as Renuka
- Nirmal Chiraniyan as Journalist
- Vijay Kumar Dogra as School principal
- Abhishek Bhalerao as Mhatre
- Waris Ahmed Zaidi as Altaf
- Rytasha Rathore as Lata
- Varad Bhatnagar as Kaasim
- Ankur Verma as Sunny
- Shruti Vyas as Shivangi, Devi Lal Singh's wife

== Episodes ==
No. in season	Title	Directed by	Written by	Original release date
1	"Missing Women"	Reema Kagti, Ruchika Oberoi	Reema Kagti, Zoya Akhtar	12 May 2023
2	"The Devil Incarnate"	Reema Kagti, Ruchika Oberoi	Reema Kagti, Zoya Akhtar	12 May 2023
3	"In Plain Sight"	Reema Kagti, Ruchika Oberoi	Reema Kagti, Zoya Akhtar	12 May 2023
4	"The Love Letter"	Reema Kagti, Ruchika Oberoi	Reema Kagti, Zoya Akhtar	12 May 2023
5	"A Leave Of Absence"	Reema Kagti, Ruchika Oberoi	Reema Kagti, Zoya Akhtar	12 May 2023
6	"Missing Women"	Reema Kagti, Ruchika Oberoi	Reema Kagti, Zoya Akhtar	12 May 2023
7	"The Stakeout"	Reema Kagti, Ruchika Oberoi	Reema Kagti, Zoya Akhtar	12 May 2023
8	"New Beginnings"	Reema Kagti, Ruchika Oberoi	Reema Kagti, Zoya Akhtar	12 May 2023

== Production ==
The shooting of Dahaad was done in a small village in Rajasthan.

== Release ==
The trailer of Dahaad was released on May 3, 2023.

The series premiered at 73rd Berlin International Film Festival, Germany on February 22, 2023.

Dahaad released on 12 May 2023 on Amazon Prime Video in 240 countries.

== Reception ==
Bollywood Hungama rated 4 stars out of 5 and wrote "On the whole, Dahaad is one of the finest shows to have come out in the Indian digital space. It boasts of powerful performances, a taut script and terrific direction, and most importantly, it also makes an important comment on caste and gender discrimination."

Saibal Chatterjee of NDTV rated Dahaad 4 out of 5 stars and wrote "The eight-part show, created by Zoya Akhtar and Reema Kagti and produced by Excel Media and Tiger Baby, is devoid of the visceral and the explosive. It has no major action scenes, no chase sequences and no playing to the gallery by the law enforcers on the trail of a psychopath. What the series does have is the spark to make the most of a classic crime-and-punishment tale rendered as piercing, rooted social chronicle."

Shubhra Gupta of The Indian Express wrote "Net net, Dahaad starts off with a great deal of promise (the first two episodes are zingers), ensnaring us with its stunning locations, but finally it comes off only intermittently engaging."

Shilajit Mitra of The Hindu wrote "I found the deliberate middle episodes of the series to be the most engaging. Varma, calm and methodical as he goes about his job, is an entertaining foil to Sinha. The series has fun with Anjali reining in her textbook feistiness and learning to work with evidence and clues. Gulshan Devaiah—cast against type as a reassuring voice of reason—and Sohum Shah as a slimy, repentant officer are excellent on the sides. It all goes to pot in the climax, which felt rushed and underwhelming for a series of this caliber. Did ideas suddenly dry up on the page? Were the makers going for a second season before budgets were pulled?"

The Times of India wrote "Dahaad brings up something we’ve seen in various Indian dramas like Raveena Tandon’s Aranyak and Dhrashti Dhami’s Duranga, among others. Like these shows, many characters are introduced and seen across the first few episodes, simmering in their own worlds until they are brought together."

A critic from Hindustan Times praised Reema Kagti and Zoya Akhtar and wrote "Dahaad is controlled and superbly orchestrated, never giving way to the sensational tone of serial killer crusades and dramatic monologues with wide-eyed close-ups."

Sukanya Verma for Rediff.com wrote "Predictable as these machinations may be, Dahaad soaks in the method to the madness. Ditching suspense for study, the offender's identity is never really a secret."

India Today wrote "All in all, Dahaad is a treat to all those who are a fan of cop thrillers and have been complaining of not watching a good one of late."

Vijayalakshmi Narayanan for The Free Press Journal wrote "Created alongside her frequent collaborator Zoya Akhtar, 'Dahaad' borrows a leaf from Kagti's 'Talaash' and delves into the frailties of men and women in uniform, painting a refreshing cut-away from the 'Singhams' and 'Dabanggs', we have been largely accustomed to."

Scroll.in praised performance of Sonakshi Sinha and Gulshan Devaiah and wrote "Stripped of its virtue signalling-scaffolding, Dahaad works best as a dispassionate game about hunters and the hunted. The show is most alive in the moments when Anjali and her posse get closer to the actual killer, or when the murderer manages to scalp yet another victim."

A critic from WION wrote "Dahaad wins not only for the way it deals with multiple societal issues but also because of its casting done brilliantly by casting agent Nandini Shrikent. Sonakshi Sinha, Gulshan Devaiah, and Sohum Shah are brilliant in their respective roles - never overstepping and keeping it restrained."

Zoom TV rated the series 3.5 stars and wrote "If you are someone who enjoys watching crime dramas with added mystery, Dahaad is an ideal choice for you. But it is much more than a story that runs behind finding the psychotic killer. The beauty of this show is that it highlights the negative parts of society, which makes one think deeply as to where we are going wrong as humans."

A critic from OTT Play wrote "Dahaad is better than what we have seen in recent times in terms of web series. It's the women's storytelling that makes the series usual yet unique given the backdrop it has been set in. Who doesn't enjoy crime thrillers? However, the writers' choice of a narrative focus is more on the "why" side of the crimes than who committed them. Well, that has worked well for me."

== Accolades ==
Year	Award ceremony	Category	Nominee / work	Result	Ref.
2023	Filmfare OTT Awards	Best Drama Series	Dahaad	Nominated	
2023	Filmfare OTT Awards	Best Director in a Drama Series	Reema Kagti and Ruchika Oberoi	Nominated	
2023	Filmfare OTT Awards	Best Actor in a Drama Series	Vijay Varma	Nominated	
2023	Filmfare OTT Awards	Best Actor in a Drama Series (Critics)	Vijay Varma	Won	
2023	Filmfare OTT Awards	Best Actress in a Drama Series	Sonakshi Sinha	Nominated	
2023	Filmfare OTT Awards	Best Actress in a Drama Series (Critics)	Sonakshi Sinha	Won	
2023	Filmfare OTT Awards	Best Supporting Actor in a Drama Series	Gulshan Devaiah	Nominated	
2023	Filmfare OTT Awards	Best Original Story (Series)	Reema Kagti, Ritesh Shah and Zoya Akhtar	Nominated	
2023	Filmfare OTT Awards	Best Original Screenplay (Series)	Reema Kagti, Ritesh Shah, Sunayana Kumari, Mansi Jain, Chaitanya Chopra, Karan Shah	Nominated	
2023	Filmfare OTT Awards	Best Original Dialogue (Series)	Sumit Arora	Nominated	
2023	Filmfare OTT Awards	Best Production Design (Series)	Shailaja Sharma	Nominated	
