= Asian Festival of First Films =

Film festival held in Singapore 2005–2009

The Asian Festival of First Films (Chinese: 亚裔首作电影节) (AFFF) was an annual film festival held in Singapore from 2005 to 2009 to celebrate and provide a platform for emerging filmmakers. It was also part of the Asian Film Market.

The festival focused on first-time film- and documentary-makers and provided a platform for emerging film talent, including directors, actors and writers. Films submitted were screened at Golden Village's cinemas in Singapore. It culminated in an awards event during which the results of the competition were announced. There were 11 categories of awards in 2008.

It was part of the Asian Film Market.

== History ==
The Asian Festival of First Films (AFFF) was launched in November 2005 by Teamwork Productions, in collaboration with Singapore's Media Development Authority.

In 2008, AFFF was part of the Asia Media Festival, and the festival director was Sanjoy K. Roy. The festival received 638 submissions from more than 23 countries, and selected 28 films and documentaries for nominations for the 11 award categories.

The festival was held on the following dates:

- 2005: 23 to 30 November
- 2006: 29 November to 6 December
- 2007: 27 November to 4 December
- 2008: 4 to 10 December
- 2009: 28 November to 4 December

== Awards and jury members ==
In 2007, Australian film Lucky Miles, produced by Jo Dyer and Lesley Dyer and directed by Michael James Rowland, won the Best Film award.

In 2008, the jury comprised Tikoy Aguiluz, from the Philippines; Yim Ho, from Hong Kong, and Nadia Tass, from Australia. Nominees included Bosco Francis (for Best Actor, in Eric Khoo’s My Magic), Auraeus Solito for Best Producer. Contenders for best director included Bollywood star Nandita Das (with her directing debut Firaaq); Filipino filmmaker Dante Nico Garcia, director of Ploning; Dai Wei for Ganglamedo (Tibet); and Sooni Taraporevala for Little Zizou (India). Garcia won the award for best director.

The 2009 edition of the festival had Australian filmmaker Ana Kokkinos, US producer Chris Lee and Indian director Kabir Khan on its jury. Indian films won seven awards, with four of those going to Sona Jain's For Real. Faiza Ahmad Khan's documentary Malegaon Ka Superman won Best Editing, Documentary and Director
