= Arjun Bhasin =

Indian costume designer and stylist

Arjun Bhasin is an Indian costume designer and stylist, who works both in Hindi cinema as well as Hollywood. He is most noted for his work in Dil Chahta Hai (2001), Rang De Basanti (2006), and has done international films like Monsoon Wedding (2001), The Reluctant Fundamentalist (2012) and Life of Pi (2012). He has also remained the fashion editor of GQ India.

== Biography ==
After studying at New York University Film School, he started working with Hollywood films for a while before returning to India, where he started his career as a costume designer with Dil Chahta Hai (2001).

He has worked with directors like Mira Nair, Ang Lee, Farhan Akhtar and Zoya Akhtar. His sister Niharika Bhasin is also a costume designer and has worked in films like Rock On!!, Rocket Singh: Salesman of the Year, Delhi Belly and The Dirty Picture.

He lives in New York and Bandra, Mumbai.

== Filmography ==
- Loving Jezebel (1999)
- Dil Chahta Hai (2001)
- Monsoon Wedding (2001)
- Just a Kiss (2002)
- Swimfan (2002)
- Armaan (2003)
- Boys (2003)
- Lakshya (2004)
- Ramji Londonwale (2005)
- Rang De Basanti (2006)
- The Namesake (2006)
- Honeymoon Travels Pvt. Ltd. (2007)
- Ghajini (2008)
- Luck by Chance (2009)
- Delhi-6 (2009)
- Little Zizou (2009)
- Zindagi Na Milegi Dobara (2011)
- The Reluctant Fundamentalist (2012)
- Life of Pi (2012)
- Begin Again (2013)
- Dil Dhadakne Do (2015)
- Gully Boy (2019)
- A Beautiful Day in the Neighborhood (2019)
- After The Wedding (2019)
- After Yang (2021)
- Ms. Marvel (2022)
- Boston Strangler (2023)
- Nightbitch (2024)
- A Big Bold Beautiful Journey (2025)
- Ek Din (2026)

== Member ==
Oscar Academy
