= Talaash: The Answer Lies Within =

2012 Indian film by Reema Kagti

Talaash : The Answer Lies Within
- Theatrical release poster
- Directed by: Reema Kagti
- Written by: Additional Dialogues: Anurag Kashyap; Dialogues: Farhan Akhtar
- Screenplay by: Reema Kagti; Zoya Akhtar
- Story by: Reema Kagti; Zoya Akhtar
- Produced by: Ritesh Sidhwani; Aamir Khan; Farhan Akhtar
- Starring: Aamir Khan; Kareena Kapoor; Rani Mukerji
- Cinematography: K. U. Mohanan
- Edited by: Anand Subaya
- Music by: Ram Sampath
- Production companies: Aamir Khan Productions; Excel Entertainment
- Distributed by: Reliance Entertainment
- Release date: 30 November 2012
- Running time: 139 minutes
- Country: India
- Language: Hindi
- Budget: ₹71 crore
- Box office: est. ₹174.21–180.83 crore

Talaash: The Answer Lies Within (transl. Search) is a 2012 Indian Hindi-language neo-noir psychological thriller film written and directed by Reema Kagti, co-written by Zoya Akhtar, and produced by Ritesh Sidhwani and Farhan Akhtar under Excel Entertainment and Aamir Khan under Aamir Khan Productions, with Reliance Entertainment serving as distributor and presenter. The film stars Aamir Khan, Kareena Kapoor and Rani Mukerji in lead roles, with Nawazuddin Siddiqui, Rajkummar Rao and Shernaz Patel in supporting roles.

The film score and soundtrack of the film were composed by Ram Sampath, with lyrics written by Javed Akhtar. Principal photography of the film took place during March–November 2011, primarily in Mumbai, Pondicherry and London. Released on 30 November 2012, Talaash: The Answer Lies Within received positive reviews from critics, who praised its themes, direction, screenplay, music, cinematography and performances of the cast. It grossed over ₹174.21–180.83 crore worldwide, becoming one of the highest-grossing Indian films in 2012.

At the 58th Filmfare Awards, Talaash: The Answer Lies Within received 3 nominations, including Best Supporting Actress (Mukerji) and Best Supporting Actor (Siddiqui).

== Plot ==
Late at night on a deserted road, well-known actor Armaan Kapoor loses control of his car, apparently trying to avoid something, and the car falls into the sea. Senior Police Inspector Surjan "Suri" Singh Shekhawat and his assistant Devrath Kulkarni begin an investigation. Surjan's relationship with his wife, Roshni, has suffered after their 8-year-old son, Karan, recently drowned during a family outing. Surjan's guilt causes him insomnia.

Surjan learns that on the night of Armaan's accident, Armaan was travelling with ₹2 million in cash, which is missing. Armaan had given the money to a blackmailer, a pimp named Shashi. Three years ago, Shashi had performed a cover-up for Armaan and his friend Sanjay. Once he learns of Armaan's death, Shashi takes off with the cash. Shashi's friend, Tehmur, begins blackmailing Sanjay with the help of an escort, Rosie. Sanjay gets Shashi murdered.

Roshni seeks solace from a medium, Frenny Mistry, who is in touch with Karan's soul, though Surjan is angry and skeptical of her. One night, Surjan is propositioned by Rosie. He declines but asks if she can become an informant. The police find Shashi's body, along with the blackmail money and a DVD. The DVD contains CCTV footage of Armaan and his friends leaving a hotel with Rosie. Rosie confides in Surjan that three years ago, she was picked up by Armaan and his friends, Sanjay and Nikhil. Surjan discovers that Nikhil has been brain-dead after the incident three years ago.

Tehmur blackmails Sanjay into giving him money so he can give it to his girlfriend, a prostitute, for a better life. Sanjay gets Tehmur killed too. The police learn Sanjay is behind Shashi and Tehmur's murders and arrest him. Sanjay confesses that three years ago, he, Armaan, and Nikhil had picked up an escort named Simran for Armaan's bachelor party. The unlocked car door in the backseat opened by accident, throwing both Nikhil and Simran out of the moving car. Armaan and Sanjay rushed Nikhil to the hospital but, fearing a scandal, left Simran to die on the road. Sanjay had called Shashi to take care of her. Since then, Shashi has continued to blackmail them. Surjan re-watches the footage and is shocked to realise that Simran is Rosie.

As he drives Sanjay to the police station, they approach the same road where Armaan had his car accident. Both men see Rosie/Simran standing ahead. In a re-enactment of Armaan's accident, they swerve the car to avoid a collision with her, and it falls into the sea. Sanjay dies but Rosie saves Surjan. Surjan writes in the official report that Armaan's death was an accident. He returns to the riverside place where he used to meet Rosie and uncovers her remains where Shashi had hidden her body. Remembering that he had been told that "the dead come to those who are troubled," he gives Rosie a proper cremation.

Now more accepting of the supernatural, Surjan finds a letter from Karan, penned by Frenny, in which Karan tells Surjan not to blame himself for his death and that he wants his parents to be happy. Surjan reconciles with Roshni.

== Cast ==
- Aamir Khan as Inspector Surjan 'Suri' Singh Shekhawat
- Kareena Kapoor as Rosie / Simran
- Rani Mukerji as Roshni Shekhawat, Surjan's wife
- Nawazuddin Siddiqui as Tehmur Langda
- Rajkummar Rao as Devrath Kulkarni (credited as Raj Kumar)
- Shernaz Patel as Frenny
- Sheeba Chaddha as Nirmala
- Jineet Rath as Karan Shekhawat, Roshni and Surjan's deceased son
- Suhaas Ahuja as Sanjay Kejriwal (credited as Suhas Ahuja)
- Vandita Shrivastava as News Correspondent
- Vivan Bhatena as Armaan Kapoor
- Pariva Pranati as Soniya Kapoor
- Aditi Vasudev as Mallika
- Vikas Shrivastav as Babu Tipnis
- Subrat Dutta as Shashi
- Gulfam Khan as Madam X
- Vivek Madan as Deputy Commissioner of Police Manish Awasthi
- Rajshri Deshpande as Priya

== Production ==
=== Development ===
Following the release of her first film, Honeymoon Travels Pvt. Ltd. (2007), Kagti was approached to direct many films by several production houses. However, unable to find any films that interested her, she began working on a new script with her friend Zoya Akhtar in early 2010. Speaking about it, she said, "Zoya and I thought of the story and co-wrote it. We do a lot of writing together. We are also best friends so it is fun and there is a huge comfort factor." Initially, Shahrukh Khan, Saif Ali Khan and Salman Khan were reportedly approached to play the male lead but opted out due to differing reasons. Upon finalising the story, she approached Aamir Khan with the script in November 2010 and he agreed to produce and star in it. Since the start of pre-production, there was speculation regarding the film's title. In November 2011, Khan confirmed that the film was titled Talaash: The Answer Lies Within.

In an interview with The Indian Express, Kagti revealed that a few months before casting Khan in the film, she had approached him with another project. Later, Kareena Kapoor and Rani Mukerji were signed on to star opposite Khan. Prior to the start of principal photography, the actors attended acting workshops and signed a non-disclosure agreement. To prepare for a key scene in the film, Khan and Mukerji took swimming lessons.

=== Filming ===
The principal photography for the film started in March 2011 with Khan and Mukerji in Mumbai. For a scene involving Khan and Kapoor, it was reported that both the actors would shoot in a red-light district. However, Kagti dismissed it and explained that it wouldn't be safe to do so. The scene was later shot at the Leopold Cafe on Colaba Causeway. The film's second phase continued with the entire cast in Pondicherry and was completed by the end of August. The final phase was expected to commence the following month in Khopoli with an underwater shot.

Khan, who never knew how to swim, underwent rigorous training for this underwater sequence. He was trained for 3 months under a specialist trainer and went well prepared for the shoot. Due to visibility problems, it was cancelled and later filmed at an undisclosed water studio in London. The filming was completed by November 2011 after some of the remaining shots were executed at the Bandstand Promenade.

== Soundtrack ==
The soundtrack is composed by Ram Sampath and Javed Akhtar penned the lyrics for all the songs. The music was launched on 2 November 2012 by T-Series. The album features vocals by Ram Sampath, Vishal Dadlani, Suman Sridhar, Sona Mohapatra, Ravindra Upadhyay and Rupesh. The song "Jee Le Zara" has a remix version.

== Marketing ==
Talaash: The Answer Lies Within tied up with Windows 8 for its marketing. Aamir Khan promoted the film on the crime detective series C.I.D. The episodes were aired on 23 and 24 November 2012. Aamir Khan visited Lucknow to promote Talaash: The Answer Lies Within. Aamir Khan also appeared in a TV special show 'Nayi Soch Ki Talaash, Aamir Ke Saath' to promote Talaash: The Answer Lies Within. Aamir Khan also visited Jalandhar for promotion purposes. The premiere of the film was held at PVR Cinema in Mumbai on 29 November 2012.

== Release ==
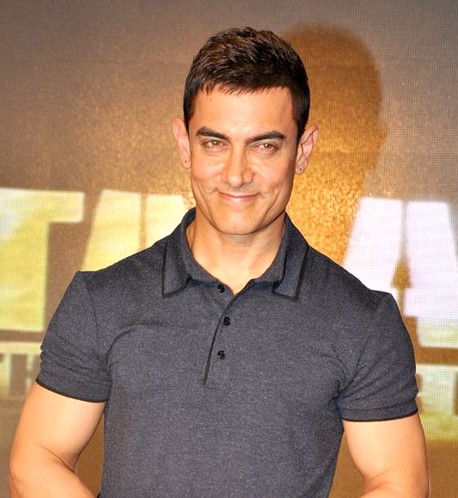
Aamir Khan at audio release of Talaash.

The film received a U/A certificate from the Censor Board of India. Originally scheduled to release in October 2011, the film was postponed to its tentative release date of 1 June 2012. Media reports claimed that the reason behind the delay was due to the similarities with Sujoy Ghosh's Kahaani (2012); the director, however, went on to deny the reports. On 26 January 2012, along with a digital poster of the film, the first teaser trailer of Talaash: The Answer Lies Within was released in theatres. Due to Khan's prior commitment plans with his television show, co-producer Ritesh Sidhwani announced that the film would no longer be able to release on its tentative date as planned and would officially release on 30 November 2012. Pre-bookings for Talaash: The Answer Lies Within opened on 25 November 2012 in all multiplexes of India. Talaash: The Answer Lies Within was released in 520 screens in overseas markets, a new overseas record for an Aamir Khan starrer; 3 Idiots (2009) was released in 415 screens overseas. The estimate for the number of release screens in India is around 2500.

In February 2012, Reliance Entertainment acquired the distribution rights of the film for ₹900 million (US$9.3 million) whilst its satellite rights were sold for ₹400 million (US$4.2 million).

=== Controversy ===
After taking offense at Aamir Khan's TV show Satyamev Jayate (SMJ) for "projecting men in a bad light", several men's rights activists took up cudgels against his film. Virag Dhulia, the head of gender studies at a men's rights community center, said "We are not against Talaash: The Answer Lies Within, but Aamir. We want to send out the message that he can't portray a negative image of men."

== Reception ==
=== Critical reception ===
==== India ====
Talaash received positive reviews from critics. Taran Adarsh of Bollywood Hungama gave Talaash: The Answer Lies Within a score of 4.5 out of 5 stars and said "Talaash: The Answer Lies Within is an outstanding film. A taut psychological thriller that keeps you guessing till the end, it leaves you spellbound, leaves you mesmerized, leaves you with an exclamation." Akhil Rasheed of the Indian Times who was partly responsible for the title of the film rated it 4 out of 5 stars, calling it a "gripping, compelling psychological thriller supported by its stellar cast". Aniruddha Guha of DNA India gave it 3.5 out 5 stars while commenting "Talaash: The Answer Lies Within successfully whets the appetite of all the Aamir Khan fans. As for the story, you can always trust Zoya Akhtar to give her best. Talaash: The Answer Lies Within is not a flawless film, but it is a fascinating tale that compels one to look beyond that which is evident. You can’t miss this one!" Saibal Chatterjee Of NDTV rated the film 3.5 out of 5 stars, noting"By no means is Talaash: The Answer Lies Within the end of your search for the perfect whodunit. But there is so much going for this compelling, slow-burning, well-acted tale set in the dark, grimy underbelly of Mumbai that you can barely take your eye off the screen."

Meena Iyer of The Times of India award the film 3.5 out of 5, adding "You may not like Talaash: The Answer Lies Within, if mystery and intrigue set at a languid pace is not what you look out for in your matinee outing." Rajeev Masand of CNN-IBN gave it 3.5 out of 5 while remarking "It's a very watchable film but not an unforgettable one." Aseem Chhabra for Rediff.com gave the film 3.5 out of 5, reviewing "In Talaash: The Answer Lies Within, Kagti weaves a complex web, and she colours it with the mood and the atmosphere she and her collaborators create. Talaash: The Answer Lies Within has the feel of a noir film. It is an intelligent film but falters towards the end." Anupama Chopra of Hindustan Times gave it 3 out of 5, stating "For once, I also feel the need to explain my rating: I wanted to give 4 stars to the first half and 2 stars to the second half, so it averages out to 3. See Talaash: The Answer Lies Within and do post comments. I'm curious to see how many were as furious as me."

India Today gave 3.5 out 5 to Talaash: The Answer Lies Within and stated "Talaash: The Answer Lies Within creates its chills primarily tapping into the dark side of the mind, which makes it an unusual Bollywood film. Any resemblance to Joseph Payne Brennan and Donald M. Grant's 1979 novella, Act of Providence, is purely coincidental." Raja Sen for Rediff has given 2.5 out of 5 stars while adding that "Talaash is well made and strongly acted but is not as enjoyable to watch as it deserved to be." Shubhra Gupta of The Indian Express rated the film 2.5 out of 5, remarking "Talaash: The Answer Lies Within starts out as a smart, well-written noir-ish thriller, and then slips between the tracks. Pity about the second half." Deccan Chronicle gave 2 out of 5 and stated "See Talaash: The Answer Lies Within only if you believe that Aamir Khan can do no wrong. Otherwise you’ll be left with a sinking feeling." The Hindu stated that "It’s not like we haven’t seen anything like this before. If Kahaani (2012) used a key scene from a film called Taking Lives (2004) as a final twist, Talaash: The Answer Lies Within uses one of the most abused endings of this genre." Firstpost stated that Talaash: The Answer Lies Within is a brave effort. Mainstream Bollywood movies try to keep it linear and uncomplicated. Directors avoid dealing with multiple strong subplots as might lead to a clutter.

==== Overseas ====
On review aggregator Rotten Tomatoes, Talaash holds an approval rating of 81% based on 21 reviews, with an average rating of 6.7/10. Metacritic gives the film a weighted average score of 65 out of 100, based on four critics, indicating "generally favorable reviews".

Rubina Khan of The First Post praised the film saying "Talaash: The Answer Lies Within is where your search for a good film begins. Reema Kagti’s search for a loyal audience for her kind of cinema ends with Talaash: The Answer Lies Within, which seems poised to make some serious cash at the box office as a sure-fire winner." Ronnie Schieb of variety reviewed "Thesping never falters – Kapoor's enigmatic Rosie in particular tying the film together by her secret knowledge (the film's revelation is a doozy). Khan's glowering, repressed sadness may appear a bit one-note to American auds, his mustache tending to obliterate nuance, but his charisma is unmistakable. For the record, the title means "search." Los Angeles Times gave Talaash: The Answer Lies Within a negative review saying "it was a mediocre Bollywood import". British entertainment and media news website Digital Spy gave 4 out of 5 stars and stated Talaash: The Answer Lies Within is the perfect marriage of cinematography, cast, dialogue and direction, despite all the evident hallmarks of Khan's own brand of brilliance, harking back to a bygone genre, the conclusion to the story might be deemed a tad too far-fetched for a modern audience. Open Magazine gave the film 1 out of 5 stars and said the film was plagiarised from The Sixth Sense (1999) and acted by Aamir Khan.

Rachel Saltz of The New York Times wrote," Shot with flair and control by the director Reema Kagti, “Talaash” works because it’s grounded in a visual style, the cinematographer K.U. Mohanan gives it a shimmering, Mumbai-noir moodiness and emotional realism and it keeps the performances reined in but also lets the actors strut their broody, praising Khan, Mukherji, Kapoor and Nawazuddin Siddiqui."

=== Box office ===
==== India ====
Talaash: The Answer Lies Within had a good opening at the multiplexes, where the collections were in the average of 65–70%. The opening in the single screens were low, at an average of 40%. The movie collected ₹125.0 million (US$1.3 million) nett in its opening day. The movie showed considerable growth in its second day, collecting ₹145.0 million (US$1.5 million) nett. The film had a good collection of ₹440.8 million (US$4.6 million) in its first weekend. The film further collected ₹62.5 million (US$650,000) on Monday. Talaash: The Answer Lies Within netted ₹643.1 million (US$6.7 million) in its first week. The film netted ₹166.9 million (US$1.7 million) in second week to make a total of around 810 million in 2 weeks. The film further netted ₹77.3 million (US$800,000) in its third week. According to Box Office India, Talaash: The Answer Lies Within has grossed 895.0 million nett in 3 weeks and was declared a "hit". Talaash: The Answer Lies Within added Rs. 7.5 million nett in week 4 taking its total to Rs. 902.5 million nett. The film's final total was approximately ₹930 million (US$9.7 million) nett.

==== Overseas ====
Talaash: The Answer Lies Within had done excellent business overseas. Talaash: The Answer Lies Within had a $4.7 million opening at the overseas box office. In its second weekend, the film grossed $7.25 million and emerged a Super-Hit. Talaash: The Answer Lies Within further netted US$8 million plus in 17 days in overseas. Talaash: The Answer Lies Within final overseas gross was US$8.5 million at the end of its overseas run and was the fourth highest-grossing Bollywood film of 2012 in overseas markets.

== Awards and nominations ==
Rani Mukerji won the Best Actress In A Supporting Role at the South African Indian Film Awards in 2013.

Award	Category	Recipients and nominees	Result	Ref.
58th Filmfare Awards	Best Supporting Actress	Rani Mukerji	Nominated	
58th Filmfare Awards	Best Supporting Actor	Nawazuddin Siddiqui	Nominated	
58th Filmfare Awards	Best Lyricist	Javed Akhtar – "Jee Le Zara"	Nominated	
5th Mirchi Music Awards	Lyricist of The Year	Javed Akhtar – "Jee Le Zara"	Won	
5th Mirchi Music Awards	Male Vocalist of The Year	Vishal Dadlani – "Jee Le Zara"	Nominated	
5th Mirchi Music Awards	Upcoming Female Vocalist of The Year	Suman Sridhar – "Muskaanein Jhooti Hai"	Nominated	
5th Mirchi Music Awards	Raag-Inspired Song of the Year	"Jiya Laage Na"	Nominated	
5th Mirchi Music Awards	Programmer & Arranger of the Year	Ram Sampath & Vrashal Chavan – "Jiya Laage Na"	Nominated	

== See also ==
- Rabbit Hole (play)
- Rabbit Hole (2010)
- Dream House
