= Made in Heaven (TV series) =

2019 Indian romantic drama series

- Genre: Drama; Romance
- Created by: Zoya Akhtar; Reema Kagti
- Written by: Reema Kagti; Zoya Akhtar; Alankrita Shrivastava
- Directed by: Nitya Mehra; Zoya Akhtar; Reema Kagti; Prashant Nair; Alankrita Shrivastava; Neeraj Ghaywan
- Starring: Sobhita Dhulipala; Arjun Mathur; Kalki Koechlin; Jim Sarbh; Shashank Arora; Shivani Raghuvanshi; Mona Singh; Trinetra Haldar Gummaraju; Ishwak Singh
- Country of origin: India
- Original languages: English; Hindi
- No. of seasons: 2
- No. of episodes: 16

Production
- Cinematography: Jay Pinak Oza; John Jacob Payyapalli; Stefan Ciupek; Tanay Satam; Nikos Andritsakis
- Editors: Apurva Asrani; Meghna Sen Manchanda; Anand Subaya; Nitin Baid; Namrata Rao
- Running time: 45–74 minutes
- Production companies: Excel Entertainment; Tiger Baby Films

Original release
- Network: Amazon Prime Video
- Release: 8 March 2019 – 10 August 2023

Made In Heaven is an Indian romantic drama television series that premiered on Amazon Prime Video on 8 March 2019. Produced by Excel Entertainment, the series chronicles the lives of Tara and Karan, two wedding planners in Delhi running an agency named Made in Heaven. The series is Amazon Video’s fourth original fictional Indian series and stars Sobhita Dhulipala, Arjun Mathur, Jim Sarbh, Shashank Arora, Kalki Koechlin, Shivani Raghuvanshi and Mona Singh.

Zoya Akhtar and Reema Kagti created the show, and they wrote it with Alankrita Shrivastava. Akhtar, Shrivastava, Nitya Mehra, and Prashant Nair served as directors for the nine episodes of the first season. Work on the second season was to begin in April 2020 but was postponed due to the COVID-19 pandemic. Filming for the second season of the show was wrapped in April 2022. The second season was released on 10 August 2023.

== Plot ==
Made in Heaven portrays the present-day India as a blend of conservative and modern mindsets, where tradition and modern aspirations are at loggerheads. The show and protagonists' narratives play out against the backdrop of lavish and expensive weddings in each episode.

== Cast ==
=== Main ===
- Sobhita Dhulipala as Tara Singh Khanna
- Arjun Mathur as Karan Mehra
- Kalki Koechlin as Faiza Naqvi
- Jim Sarbh as Adil Khanna
- Shashank Arora as Kabir Basrai
- Shivani Raghuvanshi as Jaspreet "Jazz" Kaur
- Mona Singh as Bulbul Jauhari (Season 2)
- Trinetra Haldar Gummaraju as Meher Chaudhry (Season 2)
- Ishwak Singh as Raghav Sinha (Season 2)

=== Recurring ===
- Neel Madhav as Arjun Mehra, Karan's younger brother
- Vijay Raaz as Ramesh Jauhari, Tara and Karan's confidant-turned-business partner, formerly Karan's loan-shark
- Zachary Coffin as Adam
- Natasha Singh as Shibani Bagchi (Season 1)
- Vinay Pathak as Ramesh Gupta, Karan's landlord (Season 1)
- Dalip Tahil as Kishore Khanna, Adil's father and Tara's father-in-law (Season 1)
- Yashaswini Dayama as Mitali Gupta
- Manini Mishra as Vimala Singh
- Ayesha Raza Mishra as Renu Gupta, Ramesh' wife (Season 1)
- Suchitra Pillai as Mani Pandey (Season 1)
- Denzil Smith as Mr. Swarup
- Lushin Dubey as Sheila Naqvi, Faiza's mother
- Saket Sharma as young Karan
- Vikrant Massey as Nawab Khan, Karan's teenage crush, now friend
  - Shalva Kinjawadekar as young Nawab
- Siddharth Bhardwaj as Inspector Chauhan
- Ankur Rathee as Sam
- Sahidur Rahaman as Nadeem Mechanic
- Mihir Ahuja as Dhruv Jauhari, Bulbul's son (Season 2)
- Naina Bhan as Dilshad, Kabir's ex-girlfriend

=== Guest ===
- Deepti Naval as Gayatri Mathur
- Aman Bhagat as Rahul Mathur
- Rahul Vohra as Bijoy Chatterjee
- Purnendu Bhattacharya as Raghvendra Roshan
- Neena Gupta as Veenu Roshan
- Pavail Gulati as Angad Roshan
- Aditi Joshi as Aliya Saxena
- Pulkit Samrat (seasons 1 and 2) as Sarfaraz Khan
- Manjot Singh as Joginder Sethi
- Dalai as Harsimran Mann
- Ravish Desai as Vishal Shrivastava
- Shweta Tripathi as Priyanka Mishra
- Preetika Chawla as Geetanjali Sinha
- Shishir Sharma as Mr. Sinha
- Dhairya Karwa as Samar Ranawat
- Rajnish Jaiswal as Jeet Gill
- Yaaneea Bharadwaj as Sukhmani Sadana
- Tanmay Dhamania as Nikhil Swarup
- Amrita Puri as Devyani Singh
- Maanvi Gagroo as Tarana Ali
- Vijay Gupta as Khalil Ansari
- Trisha Kale as Asma Ansari
- Anhad Singh as Utsav
- Rasika Dugal as Nutan Yadav
- Siddharth Menon as John Matthew
- Anjum Sharma as Vishal Singh
- Aakriti Sharma as Mira
- Zayn Marie Khan as Sarina Kapoor (season 2)
- Mrunal Thakur as Adhira Arya (season 2)
- Neelam Kothari as Kriti Malhotra (season 2)
- Sanjay Kapoor as Ashok Malhotra (season 2)
- Samir Soni as Gulshan Raina (season 2)
- Naina Sareen as Gargi Raina (season 2)
- Elnaaz Norouzi as Leila Shirazi (season 2)
- Parul Gulati as Amber (season 2)
- Radhika Apte as Pallavi Menke (season 2)
- Samar Sarila as Vikram Sharma (season 2)
- Shibani Dandekar as Aditi (season 2)
- Sheena Khalid as Radhika Sharma (season 2)
- Parvin Dabas as Wasim (season 2)
- Dia Mirza as Shehnaz (season 2)
- Mukul Chadda as Rohit Ahuja (season 2)
- Kallirroi Tziafeta as Elmira (season 2)
- Lillete Dubey as Lina Mendez (season 2)
- Sarah-Jane Dias as Julie Mendez (season 2)
- Neil Bhoopalam as Danish (season 2)

== Episodes ==
Series	Episodes	Originally released
1	9	8 March 2019
2	7	10 August 2023

=== Season 1 ===
No.	Title	Directed by	Written by	Original release date
1	"All That Glitters Is Gold"	Zoya Akhtar	Alankrita Shrivastava, Zoya Akhtar & Reema Kagti	8 March 2019
Tara Khanna and Karan Mehra are the co-owners of Made In Heaven, a wedding planning agency in south Delhi. Tara is married to Adil Khanna, the heir to a wealthy family of industrialists, but is ambitious about running her own business despite already living in wealth. Karan, on the other hand, struggles financially and is a closeted homosexual. Karan and Tara outcompete a rival wedding planning agency, Harmony, in arranging the wedding of Angad Roshan, heir to the powerful Roshan dynasty. However, Angad's parents do not trust his fiancée Aliya, and have Tara and Karan perform a background check on her; they discourage Angad from marrying Aliya after learning she is not a virgin and once had an abortion. Karan convinces Angad to lie to his parents that the child was his own, but Aliya is incensed that Angad must lie about her past to his family and walks out on him during a prenuptial ceremony. Tara later convinces Aliya to reconcile with Angad, suggesting that she will become financially destitute if she derails her marriage. The two of them ultimately marry.
2	"Star Struck Lovers"	Zoya Akhtar	Alankrita Shrivastava, Zoya Akhtar & Reema Kagti	8 March 2019
Things get ugly when the film star Sarfaraz Khan kisses the bride Harsimran at one of the wedding events. The groom Joginder is livid and attempts to break into Khan's hotel room to attack him. Joginder’s parents eventually step in to defuse the situation. Tara and Karan then find out that Harsimran also slept with Khan that night. However, they are able to delete evidence of the affair from the hotel cameras before anyone else can find out. Jazz, a young Made In Heaven employee who Karan has taken under his wing, gets into trouble for sharing pictures from the wedding on her Facebook page, but she makes up for it by helping Joginder and Harsimran make up. Tara convinces Harsimran to pray at Joginder’s gurudwara and cook prasad for him. They eventually reconcile and the wedding successfully goes through. Meanwhile, Tara suspects Adil of having an affair. She confides in her best friend Faiza, who dismisses her concerns as paranoia. However, Adil is later revealed to be having an affair with Faiza.
3	"It's Never Too Late"	Nitya Mehra	Alankrita Shrivastava, Zoya Akhtar & Reema Kagti	8 March 2019
Tara and Karan organize the wedding of an elderly couple, Gayatri Mathur and Bijoy Chatterjee. Gayatri's children disapprove of the marriage and initially refuse to attend the wedding, but Karan eventually convinces them otherwise. Much to his horror Karan finds out that Utsav, a man whom he ditched after a one-night stand, is now engaged to his former classmate, Bubbles. Utsav tries to convince Karan to sleep with him but Karan refuses. Karan decides to tell Bubbles the truth about Utsav, and she requests that he keep it between them. Flashbacks reveal Tara’s lower-middle-class background before she married into the Khanna family. Karan tells a friend, Sam, about his previous business venture which failed, prompting his mother to force his father into financially rescuing him; he then borrowed money from the street to start Made in Heaven and is currently paying off heavy debt. Adil and Faiza take a weekend getaway, but get into a car crash on the way home.
4	"The Price of Love"	Nitya Mehra	Alankrita Shrivastava, Zoya Akhtar & Reema Kagti	8 March 2019
Tara finds out about Adil's affair when he and Faiza are hospitalized after their car accident. Nevertheless, she agrees to donate blood to Faiza, whose condition is critical at the time. Tara and Karan lose the contract for Bubbles’ wedding when she decides to go with another company. The financial strain forces Karan to agree to organise a wedding in Ludhiana for a friend. Meanwhile, Made in Heaven plans the wedding of IAS officer Vishal and his fiancée Priyanka. On the day of the wedding, Vishal's seemingly progressive parents demand a huge dowry and threaten to cancel the wedding if refused; Priyanka comes to find out that Vishal had covertly agreed to the plan, and walks out of the wedding. Tara confronts Adil about his affair. He apologizes and promises to make things right, but she rebuffs him. Jazz uses her company credit card to buy fancy clothes for herself. She plans to return them, but Karan fires her after Shibani, an employee who resents being underpaid for her skills and effort, reports the theft to him. Shibani is later offered an interview with Harmony. Karan hooks up with someone he meets at a bar. Unbeknownst to him, his landlord has installed a camera in his room and secretly watches them make love.
5	"A Marriage of Convenience"	Prashant Nair	Alankrita Shrivastava, Zoya Akhtar & Reema Kagti	8 March 2019
Made in Heaven organizes a wedding in Ludhinana for an NRI groom who holds a contest to choose a local bride. The bride finds out that the groom is impotent on their wedding night. Afraid of the stigma associated with the dissolution of marriage, she decides to move to America anyway. Jazz’s drug addict brother steals money and jewellery from their mother and disappears. Jazz eventually finds him and brings him home. Karan’s landlord’s wife finds videos of Karan on her husband’s laptop. He tells her he was gathering evidence to file a police report when she confronts him. Karan is arrested at the end of the episode.
6	"Something Old, Something New"	Prashant Nair	Alankrita Shrivastava, Zoya Akhtar & Reema Kagti	8 March 2019
Karan spends a couple of nights in prison where he is sexually assaulted by a police officer. Tara eventually manages to bail him out. He decides to move back to his rented place and sue the landlord. Made In Heaven arranges the wedding of Gitanjali, a banker and Wharton graduate with Nikhil, an NRI doctor. An astrologer claims that Gitanjali is mangalik and must marry a tree first to defuse any ill luck. Gitanjali agrees but Nikhil freaks out when she tells him. He reasons with Gitanjali and she pretends to agree with him. Later she goes through with the tree marriage ceremony behind his back. Shibani leaves the company and joins Harmony Weddings. Adil undergoes some medical tests and learns that he has a low sperm count. Tara convinces him to take the supplements prescribed by the doctor. He visits Faiza but she tells him that she cannot be with him. Tara has been ignoring Faiza’s calls. She eventually goes to her house and trashes the place in anger. Karan’s landlord apologizes to him and reveals that he too is gay and has been hiding it all his life.
7	"A Royal Affair"	Nitya Mehra	Alankrita Shrivastava, Zoya Akhtar & Reema Kagti	8 March 2019
Adil confronts Tara about the showdown at Faiza's house before storming off in anger. Made In Heaven next organizes the marriage of Devyani Singh, an Indian Air Force pilot, with Samar, the son of the rich and royal Mr. Ranawat. Tara briefly reflects on her jealousy towards Adil's ex-fiancée Natasha, while Karan decides to withdraw the case against his landlord for the sake of the latter's daughter, who Karan is friends with. During the wedding, Jazz, who rejoins Made In Heaven after apologizing to Karan, unwittingly gets him and Tara to discover that Mr. Ranawat sexually assaulted a henna designer, Pooja, who is petrified about her trauma. Devyani meets Pooja at the Made In Heaven office and offers her two lakhs to silence the matter, when Pooja demands five lakhs, causing Devyani to close the deal and leave; unable to bear this and the realization that she carried the threat to file a case for money, Karan loses his temper on Pooja, causing a heated argument between him and Tara when Pooja walks out. A flashback reveals that Adil and Tara had sex in his office, but as the CCTV footage of the embarrassing moment went viral, Adil's father offered Tara the same amount that Pooja had demanded, in exchange for clearing his son's name. While the wedding happens in peace, a journalist, Pavleen, who is Karan's friend, exposes the secret of the molestation during a press conference called for the announcement of a merger with a foreign luxury hotel brand, galvanizing the rest of the press. Kabir and Jazz share an intimate moment on the night of the wedding, while Karan decides to file a PIL against Section 377 of IPC immediately after his return.
8	"Pride and Bridezilla"	Alankrita Shrivastava	Alankrita Shrivastava, Zoya Akhtar & Reema Kagti	8 March 2019
Made In Heaven organizes the wedding of Tarana Ali, the daughter of an army officer, while Tara decides to take up the cause for her assistant Khalil's daughter Asma's wedding with Subodh, a fellow chartered accountant at Asma's workplace. Karan finds Sam surprisingly at his doorstep, and they together reflect on the nightmare he suffered. A flashback reveals that Adil's engagement with Natasha was called off. While shooting for a music video, which she proposed, Kabir has an altercation with Tarana after she chastises Jazz; he tries to console Jazz, but she responds by telling her that he isn't fit for her. Asma's wedding soon takes place, with Tara and Karan in attendance. Meanwhile, the duo arrange for a meeting between Adil and Ramesh Jauhari, a silent partner and Karan's former loan shark. Karan soon confronts Kabir about the music video fiasco, revealing that Tarana's family is livid about the altercation. Tara, meanwhile, visits her family and grooming academy in Old Delhi, as she regains her lost sense of identity.
9	"The Great Escape"	Alankrita Shrivastava	Alankrita Shrivastava, Zoya Akhtar & Reema Kagti	8 March 2019
Karan and Tara work on the wedding of two major warring political parties, the Singhs and the Yadavs, looking to consolidate their power through a marriage between the son, Vishal Singh and daughter, Nutan Yadav. Unfortunately for them, Nutan is already in love with John Matthew, an engineer of Christian background, whom she has been in a relationship with for several years since her college days. Out of fear of her dominating parents, she relents to this political marriage. However, once Karan and Tara learn about her situation through Kabir, they decide to help her escape from this forced relationship. Additionally, they learn that Nutan's elder sister was killed by her own parents with a pretense of suicide as her sister defied her parents by loving a man they didn't approve of, who was killed by them. With elaborate planning, they remove Nutan from her fortified house the day before marriage. She ends up marrying John in a church and tells the media that if she or her husband die, blame lies on her parents for conspiring against them. Meanwhile, both Karan and Tara face their own personal struggles and attempt to resolve them: as for Karan, he confronts his own ghosts of hiding his homosexuality when he gets a Facebook message from his schoolmate Nawab supporting his fight for LGBTQ equality. Viewers are shown in a flashback about how Karan denies his homosexuality when Nawab's written love note for Karan is mocked by his classmates during a locker room meet. When Karan is confronted by his friends, he states that Nawab is trying to impose his homosexuality on him and then leads a homophobic attack on Nawab, terrorizing him. This causes Nawab to leave school with Karan guilt ridden for being the aggressor against him. Bringing this memory to light, Karan meets up with Nawab, who is now married. Karan apologizes to Nawab and then the two engage in a passionate night of sexual intercourse that never materialized when they were teenagers with mutual affection. Karan shares his emotional vulnerability with him and tells Nawab that he is his first true love. Nawab forgives him and the two continue to bond. Tara, in the meantime, participates in an intimate small dinner party with her husband and in-laws. During the dinner, Adil continues to get repeated phone calls from Faiza, that he eventually picks up. Upon his return, Tara publicly confronts him about this and then privately both fight about their broken relationship. Tara laments her relationship with him and regrets having a deceitful start to their relationship. A flashback reveals that Tara intentionally engaged in sex with Adil in his office to have it recorded, stealthily stole the recording and leaked it, using it as a means to get closer to Adil, break his engagement and allow herself to enter his rich lifestyle by being his wife. With this broken relationship, she realizes that she is paying the sins of breaking his previous relationship. With deep remorse and shame, Tara leaves the mansion and meets up with Karan in their office. They discover that it has been vandalized by extremist right-wing groups wanting to wage war against Karan for his stand on homosexuality. Both Karan and Tara laugh at their tragedy and feel satisfied that they can re-start their new lives with the expensive jewelry that Tara brought along with her, as the show ends on a note describing how Section 377 was later repealed on grounds on being unconstitutional, an action which was considered a landmark judgment in the history of the Indian LGBTQ community.

=== Season 2 ===
No.	Title	Directed by	Written by	Original release date
1	"Mirror Mirror On the Wall"	Nitya Mehra	Alankrita Shrivastava, Zoya Akhtar & Reema Kagti	10 August 2023
The story continues six months after the finale of season 1. Made in Heaven (MIH) is no longer able to plan big weddings in Delhi, and is not as profitable as before. Ramesh Jauhari, who now owns one-third of MIH, has offered his old house to set up the new office after the original office was vandalised and destroyed. Bulbul Jauhari, Ramesh' wife, has joined MIH as the Auditor. She is overseeing the finances and her approach causes friction with the staff. The episode focuses on the wedding of Sarina and Aman, an NRI. She is looked down upon by her own mother, as well as her future in-laws, because of her skin tone. She secretly takes treatment to lighten skin and ends up with a rash on her face, a day before her bachelorette party. Upon learning the truth, Aman speaks his heart out to both Sarina's mother and Karan, asserting that he loves Sarina for who she is. Meanwhile, Tara and Adil have filed for a divorce and are given a 6 month waiting period. Tara's friends stop inviting her to parties and events where Adil and Faiza are in attendance, which hurts her deeply. Elsewhere, Kabir submits a short film based on the footage he shot at the previous weddings planned by Made in Heaven to Amazon Prime Video. He also plans to quit MIH in order to pursue a Master's degree in filmmaking, at NYU, where he is planning to move with his girlfriend, Dilshad. Kabir is informed that Amazon is ready to pick his content if he is willing to make it into a docu-series format utilising the footage from all the weddings. Jazz is looking for a suitable groom for herself, which her mother resists as she would not be able to take care of her and her father. Tara has started seeing Raghav Sinha, a chef and restaurant owner, whom she meets at Kabir's house during a party. Tara's mother has now moved into the apartment Adil bought her. Karan's mother is diagnosed with fourth stage small-cell carcinoma, but is reluctant to undergo chemotherapy. The episode ends with Adil's father passing away and Adil and his mother finding solace in Tara's presence.
2	"Beauty and the Beast"	Alankrita Shrivastava	Alankrita Shrivastava, Zoya Akhtar & Reema Kagti	10 August 2023
Tara and Karan begin organizing a wedding for Anik, a life coach, and his actress fiancée Adhira. Bulbul realizes that Anik is abusing Adhira and tells Tara and Karan. The two, knowing that they cannot afford to cancel a wedding, decide not to do anything about it. At the wedding, Anik grows jealous and throws Adhira to the ground and kicks her face; the wedding is cancelled. That night, he returns and tearfully begs for her forgiveness, and ultimately they marry, to Bulbul's dismay. It is revealed Bulbul is also a victim of physical abuse. Meanwhile, Adil's legal troubles begin: he discovers that his late father had a secret daughter, Gauri, and that their father left a stake in the company to her; he confronts her, but she refuses to give up her inheritance. Tara, knowing that Faiza is pregnant with Adil's child, also threatens to sue him. Meher, the new production head of Made in Heaven, arrives in Delhi and is greeted by Karan, who begins abusing drugs.
3	"And They Lived Happily Ever After"	Neeraj Ghaywan	Alankrita Shrivastava, Zoya Akhtar & Reema Kagti	10 August 2023
Made in Heaven begins to organize the wedding of a young couple, Raj and Gargi, who do not know that Raj's mother, Kriti, and Gargi's father, Gulshan, are having an affair. Jazz witnesses their affair, and also witnesses Raj cheating on Gargi. She wishes to tell Gargi, but Tara won't allow her to do so. Ultimately, Gulshan and Kriti elope, and the young couple's wedding falls apart. Gulshan and Kriti have a wedding of their own, which then replaces Raj and Gargi's. Meanwhile, Tara fights with Adil for a 50% share in his father's company. Faiza encourages Adil to let Tara have the share; learning that Tara was the one who leaked the tape, she changes her mind about Tara. Adil tells his mother about Faiza's pregnancy. His mother is upset that Adil is having a child with a woman he's not married to; Adil grows upset that she tolerated his father's affair but not his own. Kabir's girlfriend, finding out he still has feelings for Jazz, breaks up with him. Karan visits his dying mother, who asks him to marry a woman. He refuses, and she asks him not to return. Karan falls into a debt of 23 lakh rupees while gambling, intoxicated on a fateful night, and later manages to pay off 5 lakhs. Tara notices Karan's strange behavior, but he refuses to tell her what he's been doing.
4	"Love Story"	Zoya Akhtar and Reema Kagti	Alankrita Shrivastava, Zoya Akhtar & Reema Kagti	10 August 2023
Made in Heaven organizes a wedding for film stars Sarfaraz and Leila, in Nice, France. The actors are getting married only to star in a film later together; however, Sarfaraz convinces the director to replace Leila with another actress. The upset Leila almost cancels the wedding, but Tara convinces her to not cancel. Karan gets high at a party and wakes up naked on the beach; Meher asks him to tell her what's been happening to him and he refuses. Karan, to pay off the remaining debt, siphons 18 lakh rupees from the MIH business. Made In Heaven cannot pay their fees because of this; the hotel threatens to cancel the wedding if the fees are not paid, and Tara has to ask a favor from her mother-in-law to pay all the fees. Nawab visits Karan in Nice, and tells him to abandon drugs. Karan throws away his drugs, but he and Tara have a heated argument. Bulbul's son Dhruv is suspended from school and charged with molestation.
5	"The Heart Skipped a Beat"	Neeraj Ghaywan	Alankrita Shrivastava, Zoya Akhtar & Reema Kagti	10 August 2023
Following their argument in France, Tara and Karan are now working separately back at the MIH agency. Karan has moved out and now lives with his boyfriend Akshay, leaving Tara alone. Tara plans the wedding of Pallavi Menke; a Columbia University professor and activist, and her NRI lawyer fiancée Vikram. Pallavi is a Dalit, and while Vikram is supportive, his parents and wider family express discomfort during the wedding preparation. Pallavi however, fights back against this treatment and eventually the couple settle on a Buddhist wedding, in acceptance of her caste. Karan meanwhile, is planning the wedding of Rohit Ahuja and Vidya Iyer, the latter a recent divorcee with a young son, Ved. Karan notices the boy is withdrawn and quiet, and after comforting him learns that he misses his father and is struggling to adjust to his parents' separation. Reflecting on his broken relationship with his own mother, Karan encourages Vidya to pay more attention to Ved so that he can better adapt to his mother moving on. Vidya allows the boy’s father to visit him, and the wedding goes ahead smoothly, in a traditional South Indian style. In the meantime, Adil hires a detective to spy on Tara, who takes pictures of her and Raghav together. Adil intends to use these pictures to tip the divorce settlement in his favour. Karan learns that his mother's health has deteriorated even further, but remains conflicted on whether to meet her or not. Bulbul and Mr Jauhari attend a meeting with the parents of other boys accused in the molestation case. The other parents remain obstinate about their sons' blamelessness, but the Jauharis are appalled by this and instead reprimand Dhruv privately. Later that night, their younger son Gaurav comes clean to his mother about an incriminating video involving Dhruv.
6	"Warrior Princesses"	Alankrita Shrivastava	Alankrita Shrivastava, Zoya Akhtar & Reema Kagti	10 August 2023
Tara and Meher organize a commitment ceremony for a lesbian couple, Aditi and Radhika. Radhika is reluctant to invite her homophobic parents, but Tara and Aditi invite them anyway; Radhika's mother ultimately appears at the ceremony to support her daughter. Meher dates Danish, a theater professional. Tara seduces Adil, then threatens to take his house. When Karan's brother, Arjun, appears to confront him about avoiding his mother, Akshay finds out that Karan lied to him about his relationship with his mother. They break up, and Karan moves out, becoming Tara's roommate once more. Dhruv asks Bulbul the truth about his birth father; Bulbul eventually admits that her ex-husband was abusive to her and to Dhruv, and that she killed him with a knife when he tried to strangle Dhruv. Karan organizes the wedding of a polygamist, Wasim, and his second wife, Elmira. Shehnaz, the first wife of Wasim, is unhappy about his second wife, but cannot divorce him. She tries to kill herself at the wedding, but is brought to the hospital and lives. With Karan's encouragement, Shehnaz decides to fight to make polygamy illegal. Karan's mother dies.
7	"A Taste of Heaven"	Zoya Akhtar and Reema Kagti	Alankrita Shrivastava, Zoya Akhtar & Reema Kagti	10 August 2023
Tara manipulates the Khanna family into giving her the Khanna house in the divorce settlement, and her divorce is finalized. Tara plans to live in the house with Karan and Raghav, but Raghav is upset that Tara forced her ex-mother-in-law to give up her house, and refuses to live there. Dhruv shows the police the incriminating video as proof of what his friend did. The funeral for Karan's mother is held. Danish invites Meher to his birthday party; Meher, feeling awkward around Danish's friends and family as a trans woman, leaves early. Meher expects Danish to break up with her, but he promises her that he loves her, and they stay together. Meanwhile, a wedding for Roman and Julie is organized. Roman is a talented musician who has given up going to Berklee to stay with the pregnant Julie. On the wedding day, Roman has a panic attack. Julie tells him to back out of the wedding and pursue music at Berklee. He leaves, and the wedding proceeds as a celebration of Julie. Adil and Faiza finally marry.

== Promotion and release ==
The official trailer of the series was released on 15 February 2019. The series released on 8 March 2019 on Prime Video. The second season was announced on 6 July 2023, with its trailer releasing on 1 August 2023. The second season was released on 10 August 2023.

== Reception ==
The show has received positive reviews with several critics and online reviews praising the series' dark take on the Big Fat Indian Wedding. Soumya Srivastava of Hindustan Times gave Made In Heaven four stars out of five, terming it the best desi original by Amazon Prime. Srivastava opines that Zoya Akhtar and Reema Kagti’s new show will keep you hooked.

Sanjukta Sharma of Scroll.in praised the performances, writing, "...performances, especially by Mathur and Dhulipala, engagingly and steadfastly chart a convincing trajectory of early struggles, promise, dysfunction, despair and uplifting resignation." The show's costumes received major acclaim as well, with fashion writer Shivani Yadav writing an in-depth analysis of season 2 in her newsletter, Popculture Sponge.

Ektaa Malik from The Indian Express stated the series works because all the characters, big and small, have their development curve etched well. The strong performances make each episode stand out.

Critics have described it as a telling story about human nature and greater social dynamics in Delhi.

== Awards and nominations ==
Year	Award	Category	Nominee(s)	Result	Ref.
2019	iReel Awards	Best Drama Series	Made In Heaven	Nominated	
2019	iReel Awards	Best Actor -Drama	Arjun Mathur	Nominated	
2019	iReel Awards	Best Actress -Drama	Sobhita Dhulipala	Nominated	
2019	iReel Awards	Best Supporting Actor	Jim Sarbh	Nominated	
2019	iReel Awards	Best Supporting Actress	Shivani Raghuvanshi	Nominated	
2019	iReel Awards	Best Writing -Drama	Reema Kagti, Zoya Akhtar & Alankrita Shrivastava	Nominated	
2019	iReel Awards	Best Music	Made In Heaven (Season 1)	Nominated	
2020	International Emmy Awards	Best Actor	Arjun Mathur	Nominated	
2024	Filmfare OTT Awards	Best Drama Series	Made In Heaven (Season 2)	Nominated	
2024	Filmfare OTT Awards	Best Actor in a Drama Series	Arjun Mathur	Nominated	
2024	Filmfare OTT Awards	Best Actress in a Drama Series	Sobhita Dhulipala	Nominated	
2024	Filmfare OTT Awards	Best Supporting Actor in a Drama Series	Shashank Arora	Nominated	
2024	Filmfare OTT Awards	Best Supporting Actress in a Drama Series	Mona Singh	Won	
2024	Filmfare OTT Awards	Best Production Design (Series)	Sally White	Nominated	
2024	Filmfare OTT Awards	Best Costume Design (Series)	Bhawna Sharma	Nominated	

== Soundtrack ==
Made in Heaven

Soundtrack album by Sagar Desai, Dub Sharma, Balkrishan Sharma and Sherry Mathews
- Released: 1 March 2019
- Recorded: 2018
- Genre: Prime Original Tv Series Soundtrack
- Length: 16:31
- Language: Hindi
- Label: Sony Music for Amazon Music
External audio
- Made in Heaven
- Album on Amazon Music

The music is composed by Sagar Desai, Dub Sharma, Balkrishan Sharma and Sherry Mathews. Songs are rendered by Rituraj, Farad Bhiwandiwala and Viba Saraf. Qawwali "Aye re sakhi more piya ghar aaye" is rendered by Nizami Brothers and chorus "Perfect Love" by Aadya Jaswal, Avika Diwan and Mehak Sanghera. Lyrics for "Jiya Jaye" and "Musafir" have been written by Amanda Sodhi.

Track listing
No.	Title	Singer(s)	Length
1.	"Aa Re Sakhi More Piya Ghar Aaye (Note: Originally written by the Sufi poet Amir Khusrau.)"	M S Nizami Brothers	6:19
2.	"Jiya jaye"	Rituraj Mohanty	2:17
3.	"Musafir"	Farad Bhiwandiwala	1:11
4.	"Baarat Company"	Rituraj	1:57
5.	"Roshay (Note: Originally written by the Kashmiri poet Habba Khatoon.)"	Viba Saraf	2:22
6.	"Perfect Love"	Aadya Jaswal, Avika Diwan and Mehak Sanghera	2:25
Total length:			16:31
