= Zoya Akhtar =

Indian filmmaker (born 1972)

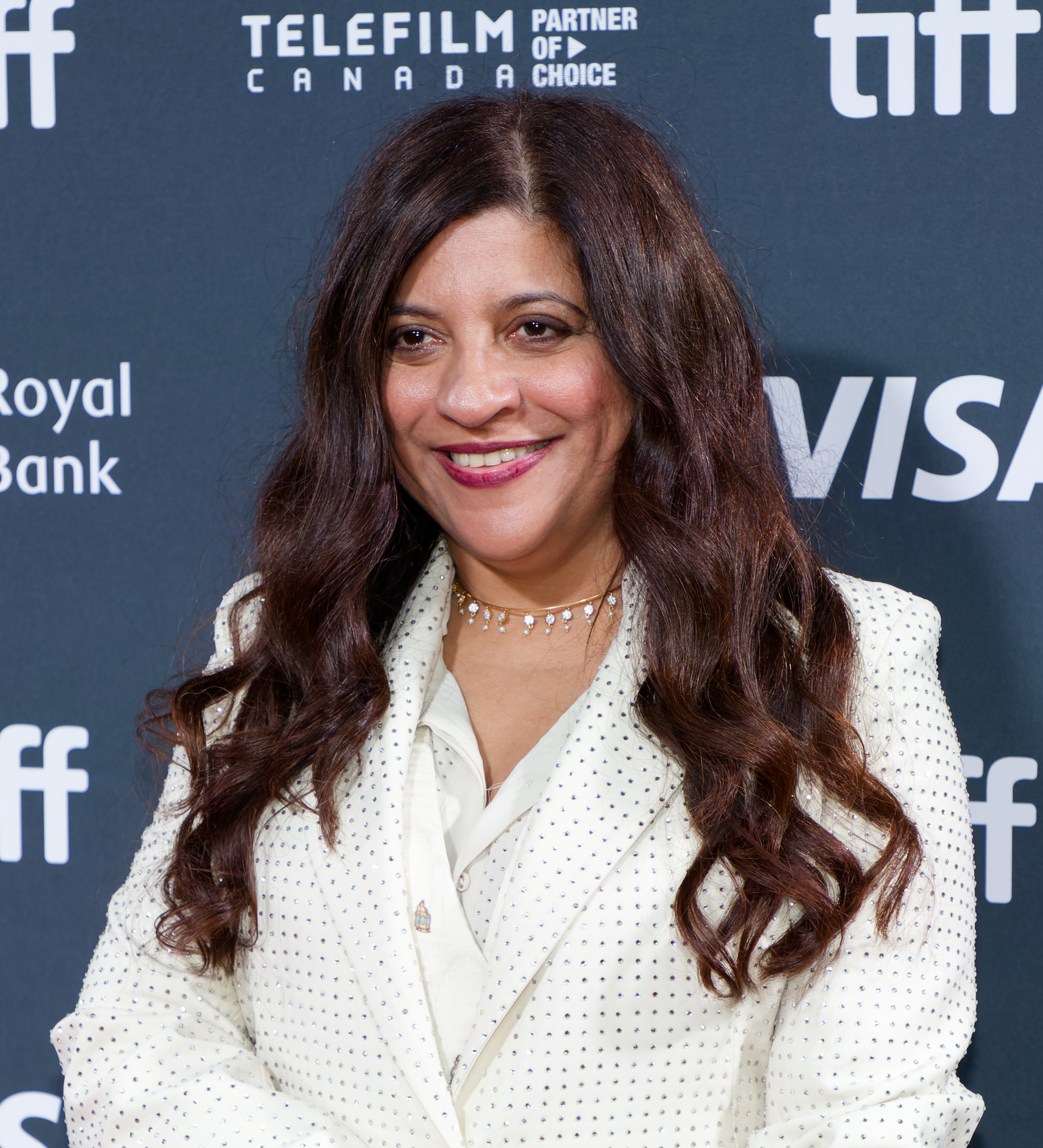
- Akhtar at the 2024 TIFF Film Festival
- Born: 14 October 1972 (age 54); Mumbai, Maharashtra, India
- Education: St. Xavier's College; Tisch School of the Arts
- Occupations: Filmmaker; screenwriter
- Years active: 1996–present
- Organisation: Tiger Baby Films
- Parents: Javed Akhtar; Honey Irani
- Relatives: Akhtar–Azmi family

Zoya Akhtar (born 14 October 1972) is an Indian director, producer and screenwriter who works in Hindi films and series. Born to Javed Akhtar and Honey Irani, she completed a diploma in filmmaking from NYU and assisted directors Mira Nair, Tony Gerber and Dev Benegal, before becoming a writer and director. She is the recipient of several accolades, including four Filmfare Awards. Akhtar and frequent collaborator Reema Kagti founded the production company Tiger Baby Films in 2015.

Akhtar made her directorial debut with the drama Luck by Chance (2009), winning the Filmfare Award for Best Debut Director. She achieved her breakthrough with the comedy-drama Zindagi Na Milegi Dobara (2011), which won her the Filmfare Award for Best Director. She has since directed the comedy-drama Dil Dhadakne Do (2015), segments in the anthology films Lust Stories (2018) and Ghost Stories (2020), and the musical drama Gully Boy (2019), which won her a second Filmfare Award for Best Director. She has also worked on the streaming drama series Made in Heaven (2019–2023) and the crime thriller series Dahaad (2023).

== Early life ==
Akhtar was born to poet, lyricist and screenwriter Javed Akhtar and screenwriter Honey Irani. Akhtar's stepmother is actress Shabana Azmi. She has a brother, filmmaker and actor Farhan Akhtar.

Her great-grandfather, Fazl-e-Haq Khairabadi, a scholar of Islamic studies and theology, edited the first diwan of Mirza Ghalib on his request and later became a figure during the Indian Rebellion of 1857 in his native Khairabad.

== Career ==
=== Early work (1996–2007) ===
Akhtar started her career as the co-director of a music video called Price of Bullets for a rock band called Pentagram. She has worked as a casting director for films including the drama Split Wide Open (1999) and the ensemble coming-of-age comedy-drama Dil Chahta Hai (2001), and as an assistant director for her brother Farhan Akhtar's films Dil Chahta Hai and the coming-of-age war drama Lakshya (2004). She then worked as an executive producer for her longtime friend and associate Reema Kagti's comedy-drama Honeymoon Travels Pvt. Ltd. (2007), also produced by Excel Entertainment.

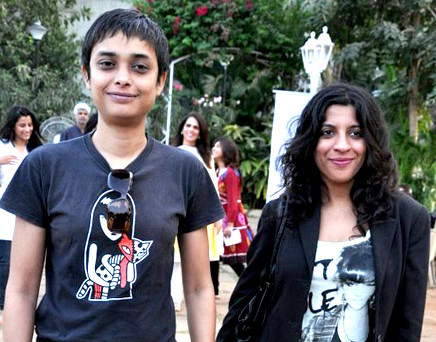
Akhtar (right) with Reema Kagti

=== Directorial debut, breakthrough and critical acclaim (2009–2013) ===
Akhtar made her directorial debut with the drama Luck By Chance (2009), starring her brother Farhan and Konkona Sen Sharma in lead roles. The film tells the story of a struggling actor who breaks into the industry. It opened to widespread critical acclaim, with high praise directed towards its novel concept, story, screenplay and dialogues; however, the film had an underwhelming performance at the box-office. It earned Akhtar the inaugural Filmfare Award for Best Debut Director, tying for the award with Ayan Mukerji for Wake Up Sid.

In 2011, she achieved her breakthrough with the coming-of-age comedy-drama Zindagi Na Milegi Dobara, which stars an ensemble cast of Hrithik Roshan, Farhan Akhtar, Abhay Deol, Katrina Kaif and Kalki Koechlin in lead roles. The film opened to widespread critical acclaim, with praise for its novel concept, storyline and setting. It emerged as a major commercial success at the box-office, grossing ₹1.53 billion (US$19 million) worldwide, ranking as the fifth highest-grossing Hindi film of the year. Zindagi Na Milegi Dobara earned Akhtar her first Filmfare Award for Best Director.

The following year, she and Kagti co-wrote the psychological crime thriller Talaash: The Answer Lies Within (2012), starring an ensemble cast of Aamir Khan, Kareena Kapoor Khan, Rani Mukerji, Nawazuddin Siddiqui, Rajkummar Rao and Shernaz Patel in lead roles. The film received highly positive reviews upon release and emerged as a commercial success at the box-office.

In 2013, Akhtar teamed up with Anurag Kashyap, Dibakar Banerjee and Karan Johar for the anthology film Bombay Talkies. It was made as a celebration of 100 years of Indian cinema. Her segment titled Sheila Ki Jawaani, told the story of a 12-year-old child who idolised Hindi film actress Katrina Kaif and aspires to be a Bollywood dancer, earned her positive reviews from critics. However, the film emerged as a commercial failure at the box-office.

=== Continued success and career expansion (2015–present) ===
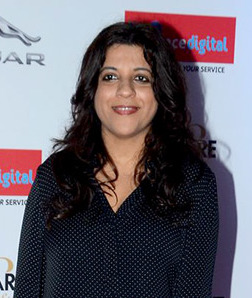
Akhtar at Filmfare Glamour & Style Awards in 2016

Akhtar next directed the family comedy-drama Dil Dhadakne Do (2015), which told the story of a dysfunctional Punjabi family. The film stars an ensemble cast, with Anil Kapoor as an egotistical industrialist, Shefali Shah as his bitter socialite-wife, and Priyanka Chopra and Ranveer Singh as their children. The film also features Anushka Sharma and Farhan Akhtar as love interests of Singh and Chopra. The film opened to positive reviews from critics, and emerged as a commercial success at the box-office, grossing ₹1.44 billion (US$18 million) worldwide, ranking as the ninth highest-grossing Hindi film of the year.

The same year, Akhtar, along with Reema Kagti, founded Tiger Baby Films, an Indian film production company.

In 2018, she again teamed up with Kashyap, Banerjee and Johar for the anthology film Lust Stories, the sequel to Bombay Talkies, which premiered on Netflix in June 2018. Her segment in the film, about the sexual relationship between a bachelor (Neil Bhoopalam) and his maid (Bhumi Pednekar), received positive reviews.

In 2019, Akhtar directed the musical drama Gully Boy starring Ranveer Singh and Alia Bhatt in lead roles. The film was loosely based on the lives of Mumbai rappers Naezy and Divine. It received positive reviews from critics upon release, and emerged as a commercial success at the box-office, grossing ₹2.38 billion (US$33.8 million) worldwide, ranking as the ninth highest-grossing Hindi film of the year. At the 65th Filmfare Awards, Gully Boy won a record 13 Filmfare Awards, the most awards for a single film in a year, breaking the previous record of Black (2005) with 11 wins. The film won Akhtar (along with Kagti) the Filmfare Award for Best Screenplay, in addition to her second Filmfare Award for Best Director, thus making her the only female director to win the award twice.

The same year, Akhtar and Kagti created the romantic comedy-drama web series Made in Heaven, alongside Nithya Mehra and Alankrita Srivastava which told the story of two wedding planners in New Delhi. The series, which stars an ensemble cast of Arjun Mathur, Sobhita Dhulipala, Jim Sarbh, Shashank Arora, Kalki Koechlin and Shivani Raghuvanshi in lead roles, was produced by Tiger Baby Films and Excel Entertainment, and premiered on Amazon Prime Video. The first season of the series released in 2019, followed by the second season in 2023, after several delays due to the COVID-19 pandemic in India. The series received widespread critical acclaim, with high praise for its dark take on the Big Fat Indian Wedding.

She was also invited to be a member of the Academy of Motion Picture Arts and Sciences.

In 2020, she reteamed with Kashyap, Banerjee and Johar for the horror anthology film Ghost Stories, the sequel to Lust Stories. Ghost Stories premiered on Netflix on 1 January 2020. Her segment in the film told the story of an ailing bedridden elderly lady (Surekha Sikri) and her nurse (Janhvi Kapoor). Unlike its predecessors, it received mixed-to-negative reviews from critics upon release.

In 2023, she and Kagti co-created the crime thriller web series Dahaad starring Sonakshi Sinha, Gulshan Devaiah, Vijay Varma and Sohum Shah in lead roles. The series premiered on Amazon Prime Video and received positive reviews from critics upon release. It also became the first ever Indian web series to premiere at the 2023 Berlin International Film Festival, where it competed for the Berlinale Series Award.

Akhtar next directed the live-action feature film adaptation of The Archies which released on Netflix on 7 December 2023. The film stars debutants Agastya Nanda, Khushi Kapoor, Suhana Khan, Vedang Raina, Mihir Ahuja, Aditi Saigal and Yuvraj Menda as Archie Andrews, Betty Cooper, Veronica Lodge, Reggie Mantle, Jughead Jones, Ethel Muggs and Dilton Doiley respectively. It opened to negative reviews from critics and audience alike upon release.

She next collaborated with Kagti, Arjun Varain Singh and Yash Sahai on the coming-of-age buddy drama Kho Gaye Hum Kahan, directed by Singh and starring Siddhant Chaturvedi, Ananya Panday, and Adarsh Gourav in lead roles. The film was released on Netflix on 26 December 2023 and received positive reviews from critics upon release.

== Filmography ==
=== Films ===
| Year | Film | Director | Writer | Producer | Note(s) |
|---|---|---|---|---|---|
| 2007 | Honeymoon Travels Pvt. Ltd. | No | No | Executive | |
| 2009 | Luck By Chance | Yes | Yes | Executive | Directorial debut |
| 2011 | Zindagi Na Milegi Dobara | Yes | Yes | No | co-writer : Reema Kagti |
| 2012 | Talaash: The Answer Lies Within | No | Yes | No | co-writer : Reema Kagti |
| 2013 | Bombay Talkies | Yes | Yes | No | anthology film, Segment: Sheila Ki Jawaani |
| 2015 | Dil Dhadakne Do | Yes | Yes | No | co-writer : Reema Kagti |
| 2018 | Lust Stories | Yes | Yes | No | anthology film, Segment 2 |
| 2019 | Gully Boy | Yes | Yes | Yes | co-writer : Reema Kagti |
| 2020 | Ghost Stories | Yes | Yes | No | anthology film, Segment 1 |
| 2023 | The Archies | Yes | Yes | Yes | Live-action musical film adaptation |
| 2023 | Kho Gaye Hum Kahan | No | Yes | Yes | Released on Netflix |
| 2025 | Superboys of Malegaon | No | No | Yes | Released on Amazon Prime Video |

=== Television ===
| Year | Show | Creator | Director | Writer | Producer | Notes | Platform |
|---|---|---|---|---|---|---|---|
| 2019–2023 | Made in Heaven | Yes | Yes | Yes | Yes | Co-created with Reema Kagti | Amazon Prime Video |
| 2023 | Dahaad | Yes | No | Yes | Yes | Co-created with Reema Kagti | Amazon Prime Video |

== Other appearances ==
She appeared on the Valentine's Day charity show of Kaun Banega Crorepati along with her brother Farhan Akhtar. She also appeared in a very brief role as Rasa Devi's (Rekha's) courtesan in Kama Sutra: A Tale of Love in September 1996. She and Shah Rukh Khan had a 'fireside chat' with Jeff Bezos of Amazon in January 2020.

== Awards and nominations ==
| Film | Award | Category | Result | Ref |
|---|---|---|---|---|
| Luck By Chance | 55th Filmfare Awards | Best Debut Director (shared with Ayan Mukerji for Wake Up Sid) | Won | |
| Luck By Chance | 55th Filmfare Awards | Best Story | Nominated | |
| Luck By Chance | 55th Filmfare Awards | Best Screenplay | Nominated | |
| Zindagi Na Milegi Dobara | 57th Filmfare Awards | Best Director | Won | |
| Zindagi Na Milegi Dobara | 13th IIFA Awards | Best Director | Won | |
| Zindagi Na Milegi Dobara | 13th IIFA Awards | Best Screenplay (with Reema Kagti) | Won | |
| Zindagi Na Milegi Dobara | 18th Screen Awards | Best Director | Nominated | |
| Zindagi Na Milegi Dobara | 18th Screen Awards | Best Screenplay (with Reema Kagti) | Nominated | |
| Zindagi Na Milegi Dobara | Zee Cine Awards | Best Director | Nominated | |
| Zindagi Na Milegi Dobara | Zee Cine Awards | Best Story (with Reema Kagti) | Won | |
| Zindagi Na Milegi Dobara | Star Guild Awards 2012 | Best Director | Won | |
| Zindagi Na Milegi Dobara | Star Guild Awards 2012 | Best Screenplay (with Reema Kagti) | Won | |
| Zindagi Na Milegi Dobara | Stardust Awards | Dream Director | Nominated | |
| Dil Dhadakne Do | 22nd Screen Awards 2016 | Best Director | Nominated | |
| Dil Dhadakne Do | Times of India Film Awards 2016 | Best Director | Nominated | |
| Gully Boy | 26th Screen Awards | Best Director | Won | |
| Gully Boy | 65th Filmfare Awards | Best Director | Won | |
| Gully Boy | 65th Filmfare Awards | Best Story (with Reema Kagti) | Nominated | |
| Gully Boy | 65th Filmfare Awards | Best Screenplay (with Reema Kagti) | Won | |
| Gully Boy | Zee Cine Awards | Best Director | Won | |
| Gully Boy | Critics' Choice Film Awards 2020 | Best Director (Hindi) | Won | |
| Gully Boy | Jagran Film Festival | Best Writing (with Reema Kagti) | Won | |
| Gully Boy | Indian Film Festival of Melbourne 2019 | Best Film | Nominated | |
| Gully Boy | Indian Film Festival of Melbourne 2019 | Best Director | Won | |
| Gully Boy | 9th AACTA Awards | Best Asian Film | Nominated | |
| Gully Boy | Bucheon International Fantastic Film Festival | NETPAC Award for Best Asian Film | Won | |
| Gully Boy | 21st IIFA Awards | Best Director | Nominated | |
| Gully Boy | 21st IIFA Awards | Best Story (with Reema Kagti) | Won | |
| Made in Heaven | iReel Awards 2019 | Best Writing - Drama | Nominated | |
| —N/a | Bollywood Hungama Style Icons | Most Stylish Filmmaker | Nominated | |
