= Supermen of Malegaon =

- Supermen of Malegaon
- Directed by: Faiza Ahmad Khan
- Produced by: Junichi Katayama; Faiza Ahmad Khan; Chung-yong Park; Siddharth Thakur; Gargey Trivedi
- Starring: Shakeel Bharti; Farogh Jafri; Badshah Khan; Akram Khan; Shafique; Nasir Shaikh
- Cinematography: Gargey Trivedi; Parasher Baruah
- Edited by: Shweta Venkat
- Music by: Sneha Khanwalkar; Hitesh Sonik
- Release date: 29 June 2012
- Country: India
- Language: Hindi

Supermen of Malegaon (Malegaon Ka Superman) is a 2008 Urdu documentary film written and directed by Faiza Ahmad Khan. This documentary was released on 29 June 2012 in cinemas. In 2025, a Hindi cinema film based on the documentary, Superboys of Malegaon, directed by Reema Kagti and produced by Metro-Goldwyn-Mayer and Excel Entertainment, was released to critical acclaim.

== Cast ==
- Sameer Khan
- Imad Shaikh
- Badshah Khan
- Akram Khan
- Shafique
- Nasir Sheikh

== Plot ==
Supermen of Malegaon revolves around the passion which residents of Malegaon, a city in Maharashtra, India, have for film making. The town is fraught with communal tensions, poverty and hardship. To get away from all this, residents of Malegaon take to making spoofs on Bollywood movies. This documentary is a journey through that movie making process.

== Production ==
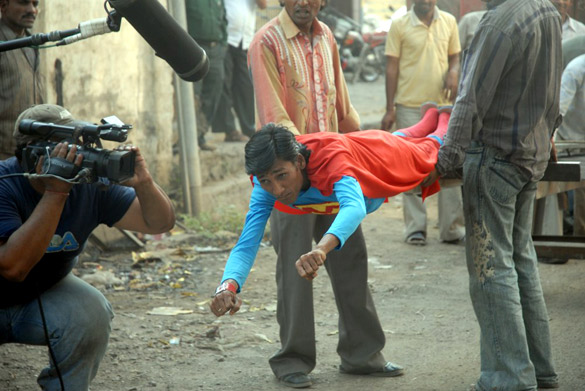
On the set.

Supermen of Malegaon (Malegaon Ka Superman) was never meant to be released as a movie and was originally made as a documentary for a Singapore TV channel.

The documentary is set in the city of Malegaon in Maharashtra, India. The movie was shot over seven months in 2008.

== Release ==
The film was released on 29 June 2012 in cinemas.

== Reception ==
Supermen of Malegaon had mostly very positive reviews.

- "Supermen of Malegaon is independent documentary filmmaking at its most heartfelt, most sincere, and most enjoyable," writes Preeti Arora on rediff.
- "At roughly 65 minutes it's brisk, enjoyable, and will have you smiling from ear to ear," wrote Masand on CNN-IBN.
- "Superman of Malegaon is the celebration of the inherent fantasy of any average human being who dreams of being either a star or a star-maker, irrespective of their eligibility." wrote Gaurav Malani on Times of India.
- "There’s not a single dull moment in Supermen of Malegaon" wrote Blessy Chettiar on DNAIndia.
- "The most touching line comes from the writer who says that no one fathoms the pain of the writer. The writer imagines and conceives the movie investing so much of his being. But only 20% of what he conceives makes it to the film and he has to suffer eternally the pain of not being able to share the rest."

== Awards ==
- Jury Award for Best Documentary at Asiatica Film Mediale, Rome
- Jury Award for Best Documentary at Kara Film Festival, Pakistan
- Best Debut Film at Film South Asia, Nepal
- Best Editing, Documentary and Director at the Asian Festival of First Films, Singapore
- Best Editing at the Asian TV Awards, Singapore
- Audience Choice Award for Documentary, Indian Film Festival of Los Angeles (IFFLA)
- Golden Camera Award for Best Documentary, US International Film and Video Festival
- Gold Awards for Editing and Best Documentary and a Silver Award for Sound Design, Indian Documentary Producers Association
- Best Documentary at Bollywood and Beyond, Stuttgart
- Youth Choice Award at Vesoul Asian Film Festival
- Special Mention at Best Film Festival, Romania

== See also ==
- Cinema Bandi, a 2021 film directed by Praveen Kandregula based on Supermen of Malegaon
- Superboys of Malegaon, a 2024 film directed by Reema Kagti based on Supermen of Malegaon
