= Sukanya Verma =

Indian journalist and film critic

- Born: Mumbai, India
- Occupations: Film critic, journalist

Sukanya Verma is an Indian journalist and film critic. She has been the principal movie reviewer with web portal Rediff.com. She has written a number of columns as a freelance writer for The Hindu. She is a member of the Film Critics Guild, founded in 2018, as well as Film Critics Circle of India.

== Awards ==
Verma won the Best Critic Award at 5th Jagran Film Festival in 2014.
