= Reema Kagti =

Indian film director

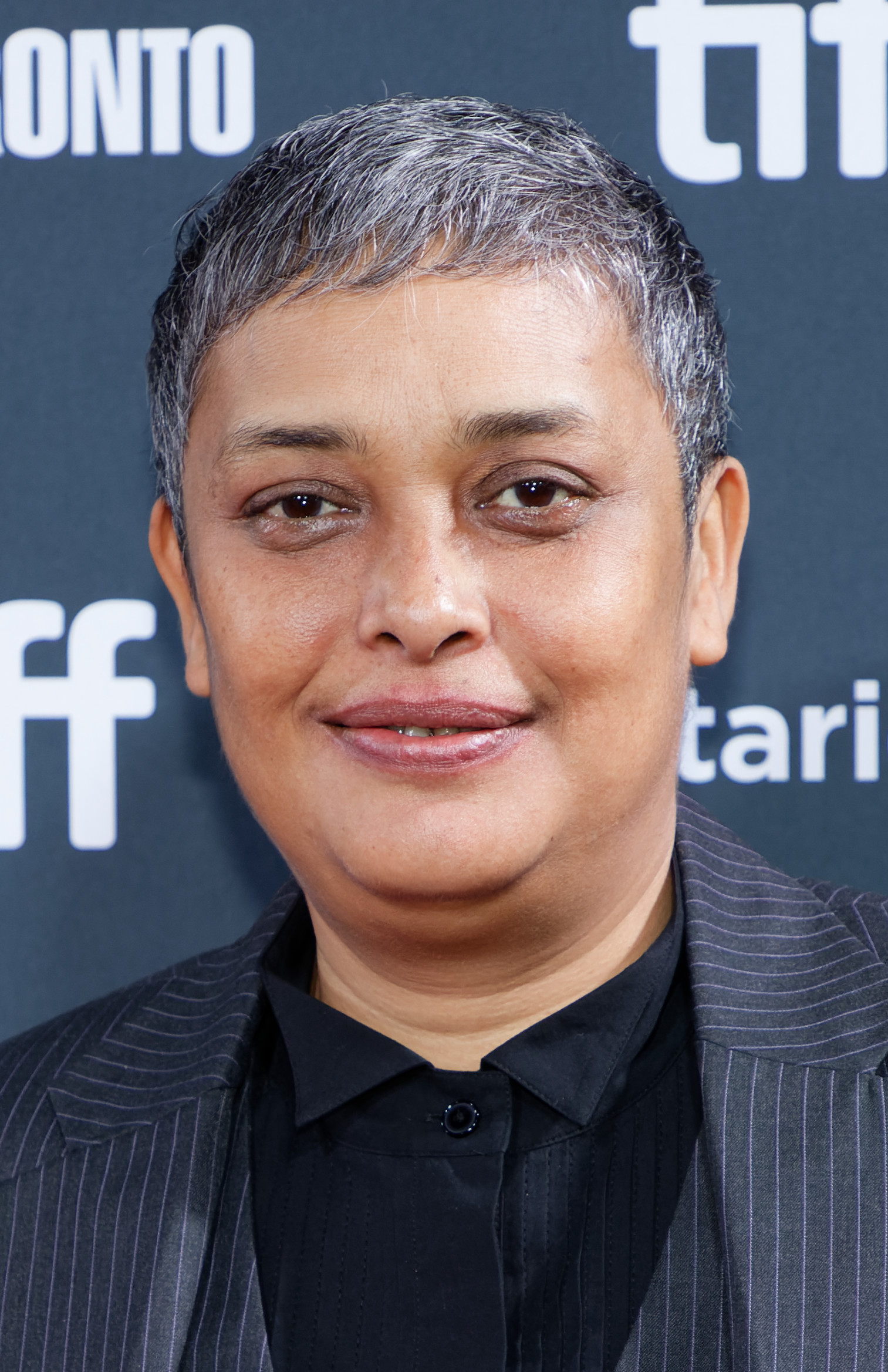
- Kagti at the 2024 Toronto International Film Festival
- Born: Reema Kakati
- Occupations: Film director, screenwriter
- Years active: 2007–present

Reema Kagti (born Reema Kakati) is an Indian film director and screenwriter who works in the Hindi film industry. She made her debut as a director with the critically acclaimed Honeymoon Travels Pvt. Ltd. (2007), which was followed by the neo-noir, Talaash: The Answer Lies Within (2012) and the historical sports drama Gold (2018). Reema along with Zoya Akhtar founded Tiger Baby Films, a film and web studio, in October 2015.

== Early life ==
She moved to Mumbai in her teens, after completing her schooling in Delhi.

== Career ==
Reema worked as an assistant director for many leading directors including Farhan Akhtar, Ashutosh Gowariker, Honey Irani, and Mira Nair.

She has been an associate with Excel Entertainment since its inception, as she has assisted both Farhan Akhtar and Zoya Akhtar in all their films and commercials to date. Together, Reema and Zoya Akhtar helm Tiger Baby Films, a film production company, founded in October 2015.

Reema made her directorial debut with Honeymoon Travels Pvt. Ltd. in 2006. Her next film, Talaash, was a suspense drama starring Aamir Khan, Rani Mukerji and Kareena Kapoor was critically acclaimed. Her next directorial venture Gold, was based on India's first Olympic gold medal after its independence.

== Filmography ==
Year	Film	Director	Screenplay	Story	Notes
2007	Honeymoon Travels Pvt. Ltd.	Yes	Yes	Yes	
2011	Zindagi Na Milegi Dobara	No	Yes	Yes	
2012	Talaash: The Answer Lies Within	Yes	Yes	Yes	
2013	Bombay Talkies	No	Yes	No	
2015	Dil Dhadakne Do	No	Yes	Yes	
2018	Gold	Yes	Yes	Yes	
2019	Gully Boy	No	Yes	Yes	
2019–present	Made in Heaven	No	Yes	Yes	Web series
2023	Dahaad	Yes	Yes	Yes	Television series
2023	Kho Gaye Hum Kahan	No	Yes	No	Also producer
2023	The Archies	No	Yes	No	Also producer
2025	Superboys of Malegaon	Yes	No	No	Based on the documentary Supermen of Malegaon
TBA	Jee Le Zaraa †	No	Yes	Yes	

=== As assistant director ===
Year	Film
2001	Lagaan
2001	Dil Chahta Hai
2004	Lakshya

=== As actress ===
- Rock On!! (2008)

== Awards and nominations ==
Film	Award	Category	Result	Ref
Zindagi Na Milegi Dobara	13th IIFA Awards	Best Story	Won	
Zindagi Na Milegi Dobara	13th IIFA Awards	Best Screenplay with Zoya Akhtar	Won	
Zindagi Na Milegi Dobara	18th Screen Awards	Best Screenplay with Zoya Akhtar	Nominated	
Zindagi Na Milegi Dobara	Zee Cine Awards	Best Story with Zoya Akhtar	Won	
Zindagi Na Milegi Dobara	Star Guild Awards 2012	Best Screenplay with Zoya Akhtar	Won	
Zindagi Na Milegi Dobara	Star Guild Awards 2012	Best Story	Won	
Gully Boy	65th Filmfare Awards	Best Story	Nominated	
Gully Boy	65th Filmfare Awards	Best Screenplay with Zoya Akhtar	Won	
Gully Boy	21st IIFA Awards	Best Story with Zoya Akhtar	Won	
Made in Heaven	iReel Awards 2019	Best Writing -Drama with Zoya Akhtar	Nominated	
