= Faiza Ahmad Khan =

Indian Documentary filmmaker

Faiza Ahmad Khan is an Indian documentary filmmaker based in Mumbai. Her most well-known work is Supermen of Malegaon, a documentary film which revolves around the passion which residents of Malegaon have for filmmaking.

She is also an activist. She directed the film The Cost of Coal, a 360° virtual reality story about the lives of the Adivasi communities living around the Kusmunda mine in the district of Korba, Chhattisgarh. She has openly protested against the 'redevelopment' of Golibar Slum in Mumbai.

== Education and career ==
In 2002, Faiza Ahmad Khan studied a course in social communications media and then worked as a production executive for an advertising agency. She started shooting short documentaries in 2004. In 2005, she worked as assistant director for the movie Anwar, with director Manish Jha.

Supermen of Malegaon was her first feature documentary, which has received at least 15 awards so far. The film has been screened at New Yorks Museum of Modern Art. However, for Faiza, the most important moment in the films life was its screening on the Narmada Ghats.

== Filmography ==
=== Director ===
- Supermen of Malegaon (2012)
- When All Land Is Lost, Do We Eat Coal? (2016)
- The Cost of Coal (2017)

=== Assistant director ===
- Anwar (2007)

== Awards ==
=== For Supermen of Malegaon ===
- Jury Award for Best Documentary at Asiatica Film Mediale, Rome
- Jury Award for Best Documentary at Kara Film Festival, Pakistan
- Best Debut Film at Film South Asia, Nepal
- Best Editing, Documentary and Director at the Asian Festival of First Films, Singapore
- Best Editing at the Asian TV Awards, Singapore
- Audience Choice Award for Documentary, Indian Film Festival of Los Angeles (IFFLA)
- Golden Camera Award for Best Documentary, US International Film and Video Festival
- Gold Awards for Editing and Best Documentary and a Silver Award for Sound Design, Indian Documentary Producers Association
- Best Documentary at Bollywood and Beyond, Stuttgart
- Youth Choice Award at Vesoul Asian Film Festival
- Special Mention at Best Film Festival, Romania
