= Honeymoon Travels Pvt. Ltd. =

- Theatrical release poster
- Directed by: Reema Kagti
- Written by: Reema Kagti
- Dialogues by: Anurag Kashyap
- Produced by: Farhan Akhtar; Ritesh Sidhwani
- Starring: Abhay Deol; Minissha Lamba; Shabana Azmi; Boman Irani; Kay Kay Menon; Raima Sen; Karan Khanna; Sandhya Mridul; Vikram Chatwal; Ameesha Patel; Dia Mirza
- Cinematography: Deepti Gupta
- Edited by: Aarti Bajaj
- Music by: Vishal–Shekhar
- Distributed by: Excel Entertainment
- Release date: 23 February 2007
- Running time: 119 minutes
- Country: India
- Languages: Hindi; English
- Budget: ₹ 100 million
- Box office: ₹ 195.1 million

Honeymoon Travels Pvt. Ltd. is a 2007 Indian Hindi-language comedy drama film written and directed by Reema Kagti in her directorial debut. It is produced by Farhan Akhtar and Ritesh Sidhwani under Excel Entertainment. The film is made up of six different stories.

== Plot and characters ==
The story is about six couples who are on their honeymoon with the Honeymoon Travels Pvt. Ltd. bus and their trials and tribulations during the four-day journey to Goa.

- Oscar Fernandes and his wife Naheed have just recently married. They are middle-aged and the target of constant mocking from everyone else. However, they intend on having a great journey and not be bothered by their difficult pasts. This is their second marriage. Oscar's first wife committed suicide, and Naheed's husband and two children died in a car accident. Oscar is Naheed's first husband's business partner. After a chance meeting with Oscar's estranged daughter in Goa, father and daughter mend their relationship.
- Partho Sen and Milly Sen are a couple from a small town in Bengal. He is a serious man, and she behaves as a traditional sari-wearing wife. Through an encounter with a bunch of thugs, Partho finds out his timid housewife holds a black belt in martial arts, as she defeats the crooks without breaking a sweat.
- Madhu and Bunty have also recently married. Their differences draw from the fact that he is an NRI (non-resident Indian), while she has lived in Mumbai, India, her entire life. Bunty is a closet homosexual, and his parents want him to marry the daughter of a family friend. Out of anxiety, he surfed the internet for a bride. He met Madhu online, came to India, and married quickly. Madhu had a recently failed relationship with a man, whom she left after discovering that he had a wife and child already. She found Bunty and married quickly to forget that pain.
- Pinky and Vicky hail from Delhi. They couldn't be more different, as Pinky is very extroverted and Vicky is the opposite. When Vicky meets Bunty for the first time, he develops romantic feelings for him, as he is a closet bisexual, but doesn't express them.
- Hitesh and Shilpa are from Gujarat and have similarly married recently. During the first half-hour, Shilpa runs away with her boyfriend, Jignesh. They board the Honeymoon Travels bus returning to Mumbai while escaping from contract killers sent by Shilpa's father.
- Aspi and Zara are seemingly the most perfect couple of them all. They've never fought. Unknown to each other, each is a superhero and has to go off at a moment's notice to help the people. When Zara questions Aspi over his whereabouts when he is not to be found some nights, they fight for the first time; in the course of the confrontation, the truth about their superhero identities is revealed to each other.

As the bus continues its journey, it is followed by a mysterious biker, who is revealed early on to be Jignesh, Shilpa's boyfriend.

== Cast ==
- Abhay Deol as Aspi
- Minissha Lamba as Zara
- Ranvir Shorey as Hitesh Roshan
- Kay Kay Menon as Partho Sen
- Shabana Azmi as Naheed
- Boman Irani as Oscar Fernandes
- Raima Sen as Milly Sen
- Sandhya Mridul as Madhu
- Vikram Chatwal as Bunty
- Ayaz Khan as Madhu's Boyfriend
- Ameesha Patel as Pinky
- Karan Khanna as Vikas 'Vicky' Bihani
- Dia Mirza as Shilpa Vaghani
- Arjun Rampal as Jignesh (special appearance)
- Suzanne Bernert as Ditta
- Shahana Goswami as Geena Fernandes (Oscar's daughter)
- Chandan Bisht as Ditta's love interest and Ramprasad's nephew
- Darshan Jariwala as Ramprasad the Bus Driver
- Harssh A. Singh as Narrator.

== Soundtrack ==
Honeymoon Travels Pvt. Ltd.

Soundtrack album by Vishal–Shekhar
- Released: November 2006 (India)
- Genre: Feature film soundtrack
- Label: T-Series
- Producer: Vishal–Shekhar

Vishal–Shekhar chronology
I See You (2006)	Honeymoon Travels Pvt. Ltd. (2006)	Ta Ra Rum Pum (2007)

The soundtrack was composed by Vishal–Shekhar, with lyrics written by Javed Akhtar.

No.	Title	Singers	Length
1.	"Sajnaji"	Sunidhi Chauhan, Shekhar Ravjiani	03:42
2.	"Jaane Hai Woh Kahan"	Shreya Ghoshal, Shaan	03:56
3.	"Albela"	Vishal Dadlani, Shankar Mahadevan	03:44
4.	"Halke Halke Rang Chhalkein"	Neeraj Shridhar	05:16
5.	"Pyaar Ki Yeh Kahani"	Sunidhi Chauhan, Gayatri Ganjawala, Vishal Dadlani	05:28
6.	"Haath Dhore Niye Chalo"	Instrumental	04:11
7.	"Halke Halke – Remix"	Neeraj Shridhar	04:01

== Reception ==
=== Box office ===
The film collected ₹11.80 crore and was declared an average grosser in India by Box Office India.

=== Critical response ===
Anupama Chopra of India Today gave a positive review saying "Thankfully, Kagti, who also scripted the movie, works with a light hand. There are a few leaden emotional scenes but they are crowded out by the non-stop fun and games. It all heads toward the superb set-piece item: Sajna main vari vari. The cast reads like a who's who of Bollywood's most underrated actors: Ranvir Shorey, Abhay Deol, Kay Kay Menon, Raima Sen. The last two are especially good as the Bengali couple whose equation changes as their honeymoon progresses. Kagti's is a fresh and original voice. This ride is worth taking." Jaspreet Pandohar of BBC.com gave the film 3 out of 5 stars stating "Kagti's peppy screenplay and direction may not win awards for originality, but it's a decent effort from a young female filmmaker just starting out. Her likeable characters playing out quirky scenarios hold your attention. However, it's a select number of good individual performances, such as Kay Kay Menon's uptight spouse who lets loose thanks to some magic mushrooms, rather than a collective ensemble effort, that stops Honeymoon Travels Pvt Ltd from being a bigger success." Sudhish Kamath of The Hindu labelled the film "a refreshingly delightful trip exploring the complexity of human relationships with the disarming simplicity of everyday life. Just one word of caution. Don't take any of the storytelling too seriously. And don't take it at the surface-level either."

Conversely, Khalid Mohamed writing for Hindustan Times stated "Despite a jumbo starcast, Honeymoon Travels Pvt Ltd is just about passable." Elvis D'Silva of Rediff.com gave the film 1.5 stars out of 5, writing "As a debutante it must be wonderful for director Reema Kagti to have the backing of major industry players like Farhan Akhtar and Ritesh Sidhwani. Nothing about the film serves as proof of that faith."
