= Jagran Film Festival =

Film festival in India

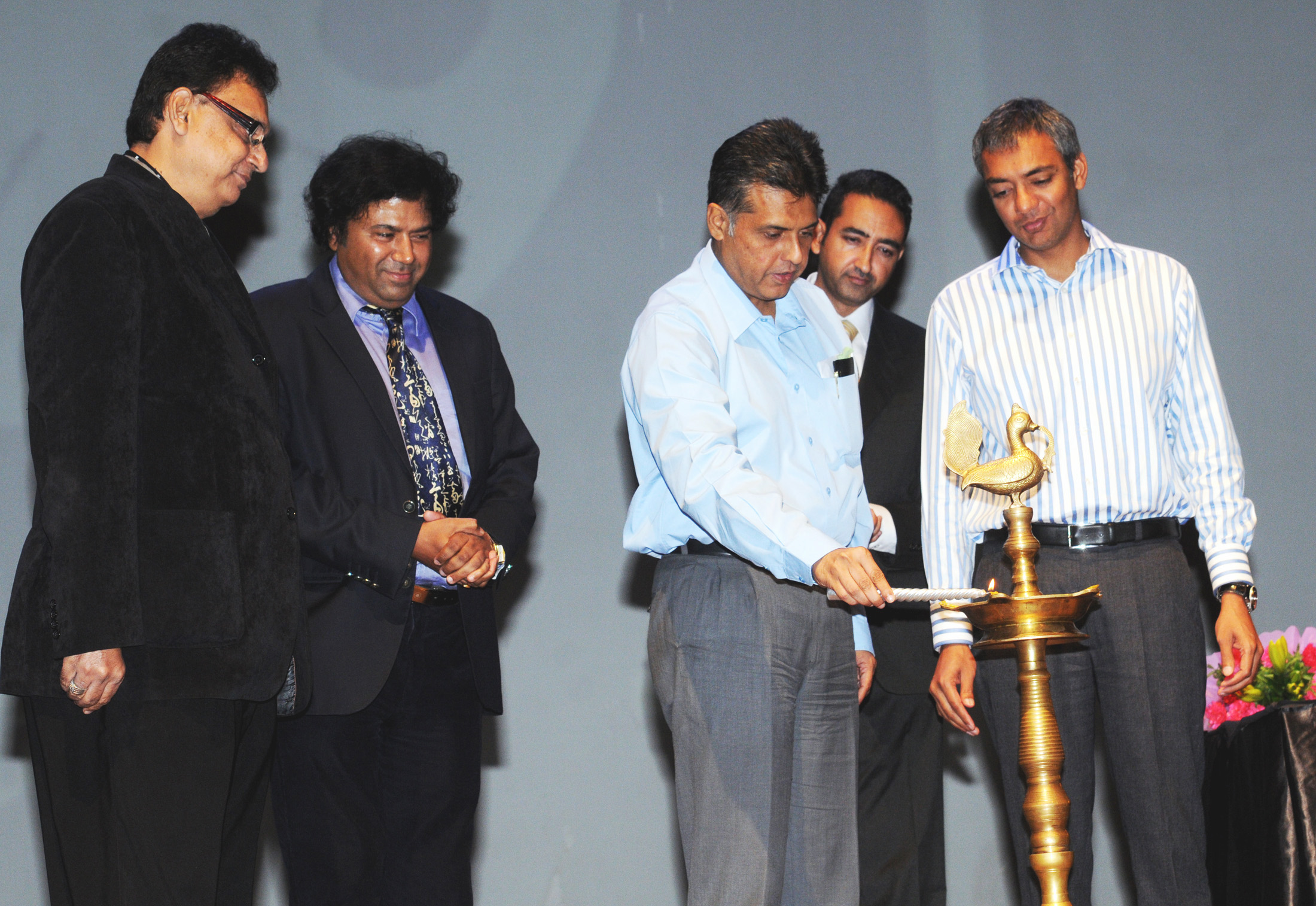
- The JFF was inaugurated in 2013 by Manish Tewari, the Minister of State for Information & Broadcasting
- Location: Various cities in India
- Established: 2010
- Founded by: Jagran Prakashan
- Language: Hindi, English

Jagran Film Festival (JFF) is a travelling film festival that was founded in India in 2010. The festival is an initiative of the Jagran Prakashan Group, with the aim of promoting the appreciation of cinematic art in smaller towns beyond the major metropolitan cities of India. It serves as a platform to showcase diverse films and engage audiences across different regions.

The seventh edition of the festival commenced in Delhi and traveled through various cities including Kanpur, Lucknow, Allahabad, Varanasi, Agra, Meerut, Dehradun, Hisar, Ludhiana, Patna, Ranchi, Jamshedpur, Raipur, Indore and Bhopal, culminating in Mumbai. The eighth edition of the festival includes competitive film sections, such as Jagran Shorts (for international short films), World Panorama (for international feature films), the Indian Showcase (for Indian feature films), and Cinema of the Sellers (for advertising and public service advertising films), offering prize money to participants.

== JFF-2019 ==
The 10th Jagran Film Festival was inaugurated at an event held in New Delhi's Siri Fort Auditorium. The inauguration was led by Prakash Javadekar, the Union Minister of Information & Broadcasting.

== JFF-2018 ==
9th edition of the Jagran Film Festival commenced in June in Delhi and culminated in Mumbai.

== JFF-2017 ==
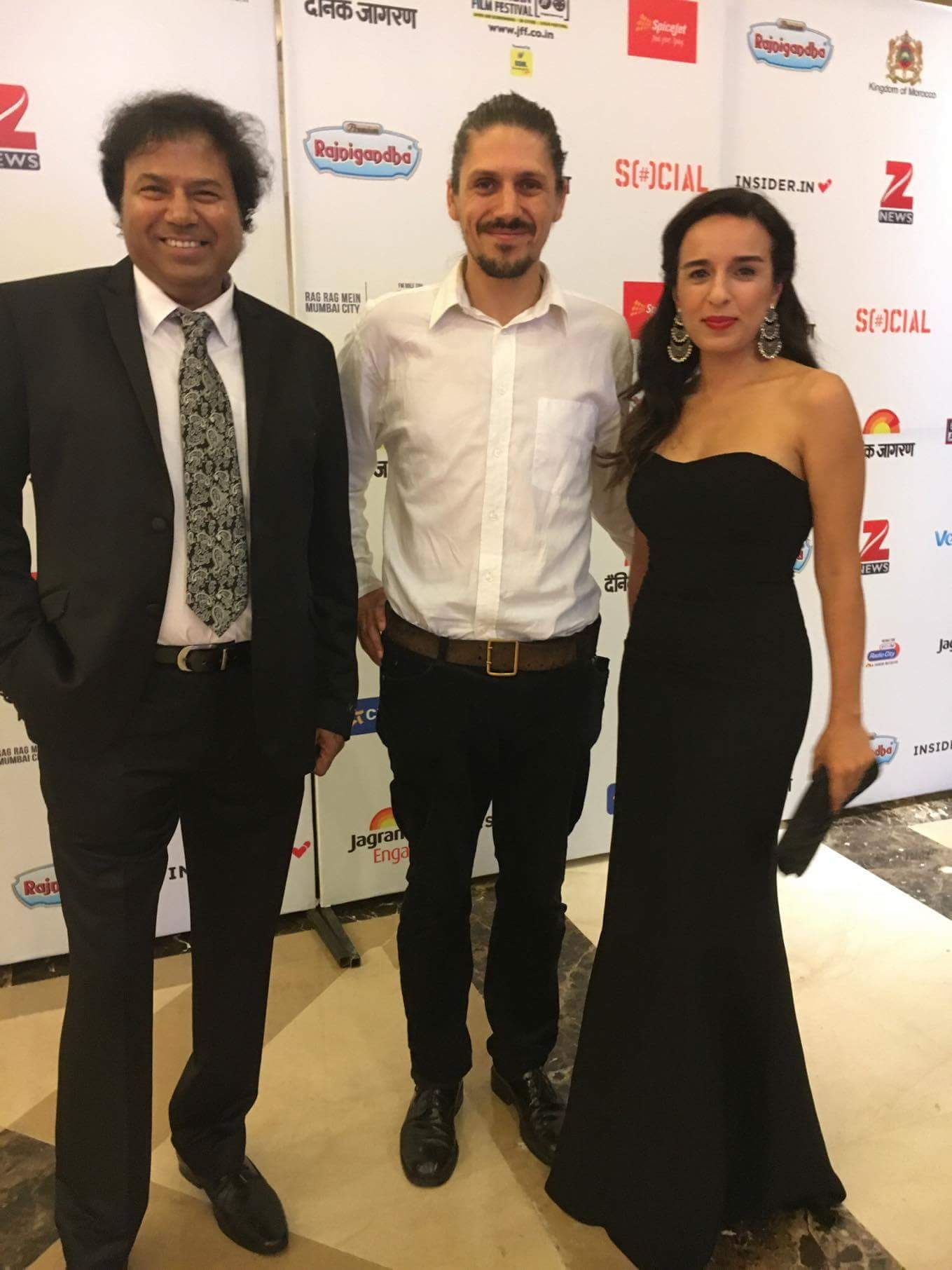
Austrian filmmaker and actor Otwin Biernat at Jagran Film Festival, 2017

- Partners: According to news reports Barry John Acting Studio (BJAS) is going to partner in the 8th season of Jagran Film Festival (JFF).
- Video Partners: According to news reports Veblr.com is the official video partner in the 8th season of Jagran Film Festival (JFF) 2017.

== JFF-2016 ==
- Consultants: Mayank Shekhar and Manoj Srivastava.
- Feature Film Competition Jury: Sarika, Jahnu Barua, Ballu Saluja, Sandesh Shandilya, Shekhar Das and Avinash Arun.
- International Competition for Short Films Jury: Jahnu Barua (chairman), Rajit Kapur (Member), Elena Fernandes (Member)

Partners: Whistling Woods International, Mumbai, Asia Pacific Screen Awards

== JFF 2015 ==
- Feature Film Competition Jury :Hariharan, Pooja Bhatt, Sreekar Prasad, Mahesh Aney, Udit Narayan
- International Competition for Short Films: Shaji N. Karun (chairman), Mozhgan Taraneh, Kunal Kapoor

== JFF 2014 ==
- Feature Film Competition Jury: Amol Palekar (chairman), Madhu Ambat, Kavita Lankesh, Umesh Gupta
- International Competition for Short Films: Goutam Ghose (chairman), Philip Cheah, Iokim Milonas

== JFF 2013 ==
- Feature Film Competition Jury: Basu Chatterjee (chairman), Ramakrishna Halkere, Aditi Deshpandey, Suresh Pai
- International Competition for Short Films : N. Chandra, Dorothy Briere
