= Tiger Baby Films =

Indian film production company

- Company type: Private limited company
- Industry: Entertainment; Film production; Film distribution
- Founded: October 2015
- Founders: Zoya Akhtar; Reema Kagti
- Headquarters: Mumbai, Maharashtra, India
- Products: Films
- Services: Film production OTT platform

Tiger Baby Films is an Indian film production company owned by film directors Zoya Akhtar and Reema Kagti. The company was founded in October 2015.

== Productions ==
Tiger Baby made its debut production with the musical-drama Gully Boy. The film premiered at the Berlin International Film Festival on 9 February 2019. Released on 15 February 2019, it is directed by Zoya Akhtar. Gully Boy is co-produced by Tiger Baby, and Farhan Akhtar and Ritesh Sidhwani's Excel Entertainment. The film won the Best Feature Film Award at Asian Academy Creative Award. Gully Boy was selected as India’s official entry for the 92nd Academy Awards in the Best Foreign Language Film category. However, the movie didn’t make it to the final shortlist of 10 International Feature Films announced by the Academy of Motion Picture Arts and Sciences.

The production house released its first web series, Made in Heaven, on Amazon Prime Video India on 8 March 2019. The web series starred Arjun Mathur and Sobhita Dhulipala as the protagonists – Karan and Tara, who run a wedding planning agency by the titular name Made in Heaven. The web series is co-produced by Tiger Baby and Excel Entertainment. It is created by Zoya Akhtar and Reema Kagti, and the duo has written the screenplay along with scriptwriter and director Alankrita Shrivastava. It is directed by Zoya Akhtar, Nitya Mehra, Alankrita Shrivastava, and Prashant Nair.

Tiger Baby also produced Eternally Confused and Eager for Love for Netflix, a story about an awkward 24-year old named Ray, navigating through life with the help of his 'inner voice'. The show was directed by Rahul Nair and starred Vihaan Samat in the lead role.
