= 2024 Filmfare OTT Awards =

5th edition of Indian media award ceremony

- Awarded for: Excellence in OTT content
- Date: 1 December 2024
- Country: India
- Presented by: Filmfare
- Hosted by: Sharib Hashmi; Meiyang Chang
- First award: 19 December 2020

Highlights
- Most nominations: Heeramandi (17)
- Best Drama Series: The Railway Men
- Best Comedy Series: Maamla Legal Hai
- Best Film: Web Originals: Amar Singh Chamkila
- Best Non-Fiction Original (Series): The Hunt for Veerappan
- Best Series Critics: Mumbai Diaries (Season 2)
- Website: 2024 Filmfare OTT Awards

2024 Filmfare OTT Awards, the fifth edition of awards presented to honour artistic and technical excellence in original programming on over-the-top streaming media in Hindi-language. Web original shows or films released across OTT platforms between 1 August 2023 and 31 July 2024 were eligible for Awards. Nominations were announced by Filmfare on 28 November 2024.

Heeramandi led the ceremony with 17 nominations, followed by Panchayat (Season 3) with 16 nominations and Kho Gaye Hum Kahan with 13 nominations.

Amar Singh Chamkila won 10 awards, including Best Web Original Film, Best Director in a Web Original Film (for Imtiaz Ali), and Best Actor in a Web Original Film (for Diljit Dosanjh), thus becoming the most-awarded film at the ceremony.

== Winners and nominees ==
Sources: nominations

Sources: winners

- Winners denoted in **boldface**

=== Popular awards ===
Drama Series
Best Series	Best Director
**The Railway Men – Netflix**; Guns & Gulaabs – Netflix; Heeramandi – Netflix; Kaala Paani – Netflix; Kota Factory (Season 3) – Netflix; Made In Heaven (Season 2) – Amazon Prime Video; Mumbai Diaries (Season 2) – Amazon Prime Video	**Sameer Saxena And Amit Golani – Kaala Paani**; Abhishek Chaubey – Killer Soup; Nikkhil Advani – Mumbai Diaries (Season 2); Pratish Mehta – Kota Factory (Season 3); Sanjay Leela Bhansali – Heeramandi; Raj & DK – Guns & Gulaabs; Shiv Rawail – The Railway Men
Best Actor (Male)	Best Actor (Female)
**Gagan Dev Riar – Scam 2003: The Telgi Story**; Arjun Mathur – Made In Heaven (Season 2); Kay Kay Menon – Bambai Meri Jaan; Priyanshu Painyuli – Shehar Lakhot; Riteish Deshmukh – Pill; Surya Sharma – Undekhi (Season 3)	**Manisha Koirala – Heeramandi**; Huma Qureshi – Maharani (Season 3); Konkona Sen Sharma – Mumbai Diaries (Season 2); Sobhita Dhulipala – Made In Heaven (Season 2); Sonakshi Sinha – Heeramandi; Sushmita Sen – Taali
Best Supporting Actor (Male)	Best Supporting Actor (Female)
**R Madhavan – The Railway Men**; Babil Khan – The Railway Men; Chandan Roy Sanyal – Shehar Lakhot; Gulshan Devaiah – Guns & Gulaabs; Shashank Arora – Made In Heaven (Season 2); Sukant Goel – Kaala Paani	**Mona Singh – Made In Heaven (Season 2)**; Kubbra Sait – Shehar Lakhot; Lara Dutta – Ranneeti: Balakot & Beyond; Nimrat Kaur – School of Lies; Richa Chadha – Heeramandi; Sanjeeda Sheikh – Heeramandi; Tillotama Shome – Kota Factory (Season 3)
Comedy Series
Best Series / Special
**Maamla Legal Hai – Netflix**; Gullak (Season 4) – SonyLIV; Panchayat (Season 3) – Amazon Prime Video; Half Pants Full Pants – Amazon Prime Video; Sunflower (Season 2) – ZEE5; Hostel Daze (Season 4) – Amazon Prime Video; Tribhuvan Mishra CA Topper – Netflix
Best Actor (Male)	Best Actor (Female)
**Rajkummar Rao – Guns & Gulaabs**; Jameel Khan – Gullak (Season 4); Jitendra Kumar – Panchayat (Season 3); Manav Kaul – Tribhuvan Mishra CA Topper; Manoj Bajpayee – Killer Soup; Ravi Kishan – Maamla Legal Hai	**Geetanjali Kulkarni – Gullak (Season 4)**; Maanvi Gagroo – Half Love Half Arranged; Neena Gupta – Panchayat (Season 3); Rasika Dugal – Humorously Yours (Season 3); Tillotama Shome – Tribhuvan Mishra CA Topper
Best Supporting Actor (Male)	Best Supporting Actor (Female)
**Faisal Malik – Panchayat (Season 3)**; Durgesh Kumar – Panchayat (Season 3); Girish Kulkarni – Sunflower (Season 2); Raghubir Yadav – Panchayat (Season 3); Shubhrajyoti Barat – Tribhuvan Mishra CA Topper; Vaibhav Raj Gupta – Gullak (Season 4)	**Nidhi Bisht – Maamla Legal Hai**; Ahsaas Channa – Hostel Daze (Season 4); Sheeba Chaddha – Permanent Roommates (Season 3); Sunita Rajwar – Panchayat (Season 3); Sunita Rajwar – Gullak (Season 4); Shweta Basu Prasad – Tribhuvan Mishra CA Topper
Web Originals
Best Film	Best Director
**Amar Singh Chamkila – Netflix**; Bhakshak – Netflix; Jaane Jaan – Netflix; Kadak Singh – ZEE5; Kho Gaye Hum Kahan – Netflix; Mast Mein Rehne Ka – Amazon Prime Video	**Imtiaz Ali – Amar Singh Chamkila**; Aniruddha Roy Chowdhury – Kadak Singh; Arjun Varain Singh – Kho Gaye Hum Kahan; Pulkit – Bhakshak; Sujoy Ghosh – Jaane Jaan; Vijay Maurya – Mast Mein Rehne Ka
Best Actor (Male)	Best Actor (Female)
**Diljit Dosanjh – Amar Singh Chamkila**; Adarsh Gourav – Kho Gaye Hum Kahan; Jackie Shroff – Mast Mein Rehne Ka; Jaideep Ahlawat – Jaane Jaan; Nawazuddin Siddiqui – Haddi; Pankaj Tripathi – Kadak Singh; Siddhant Chaturvedi – Kho Gaye Hum Kahan	**Kareena Kapoor Khan – Jaane Jaan**; Ananya Panday – Kho Gaye Hum Kahan; Bhumi Pednekar – Bhakshak; Divya Dutta – Sharmajee Ki Beti; Neena Gupta – Mast Mein Rehne Ka; Parineeti Chopra – Amar Singh Chamkila; Tabu – Khufiya
Best Supporting Actor (Male)	Best Supporting Actor (Female)
**Jaideep Ahlawat – Maharaj**; Abhishek Banerjee – Apurva; Abhishek Chauhan – Mast Mein Rehne Ka; Ali Fazal – Khufiya; Sparsh Shrivastava – Ae Watan Mere Watan; Vijay Varma – Jaane Jaan	**Wamiqa Gabbi – Khufiya**; Dimple Kapadia – Murder Mubarak; Karisma Kapoor – Murder Mubarak; Monika Panwar – Mast Mein Rehne Ka; Parvathy Thiruvothu – Kadak Singh; Sharvari – Maharaj
Best Non – Fiction Original (Series)
**The Hunt for Veerappan – Netflix**; Love Storiyaan – Amazon Prime Video; Rainbow Rishta – Amazon Prime Video; Curry & Cyanide: The Jolly Joseph Case – Netflix; The Great Indian Kapil Show – Netflix; Wedding.con – Amazon Prime Video
Writing Awards
Best Original Story (Series)	Best Original Dialogue (Series)
**Biswapati Sarkar – Kaala Paani**; Chandan Kumar – Panchayat (Season 3); Moin Beg – Heeramandi; Puneet Batra And Arunabh Kumar – Kota Factory (Season 3); Puneet Krishna – Tribhuvan Mishra CA Topper; Shreyansh Pandey And Vidit Tripathi – Gullak (Season 4)	**Sumit Arora – Guns & Gulaabs**; Chandan Kumar – Panchayat (Season 3); Divya Nidhi And Vibhu Puri – Heeramandi; Puneet Batra, Pravin Yadav, Manish Chandwani And Nikita Lalwani – Kota Factory (Season 3); Puneet Krishna – Tribhuvan Mishra CA Topper; Vidit Tripathi – Gullak (Season 4)
Best Original Screenplay (Series)	Best Adapted Screenplay (Series)
**Raj & DK And Suman Kumar – Guns & Gulaabs**; Biswapati Sarkar – Kaala Paani; Chandan Kumar – Panchayat (Season 3); Puneet Krishna, Arati Raval, Sumit Purohit And Karan Vyas – Tribhuvan Mishra CA Topper; Sanjay Leela Bhansali And Vibhu Puri – Heeramandi; Vidit Tripathi – Gullak (Season 4)	**Kiran Yadnyopavit, Kedar Patankar And Karan Vyas – Scam 2003: The Telgi Story**; Aayush Gupta – The Railway Men; Amitabh Singh And Ishan Bajpai – Dehati Ladke; Mustafa Neemuchwala And Udai Singh Pawar – Murder In Mahim
Best Original Screenplay (Web Original Film)	Best Dialogue (Web Original Film)
**Imtiaz Ali And Sajid Ali – Amar Singh Chamkila**; Ritesh Shah – Kadak Singh; Tahira Kashyap Khurrana – Sharmajee Ki Beti; Vijay Maurya – Mast Mein Rehne Ka; Zoya Akhtar, Arjun Varain Singh, and Reema Kagti – Kho Gaye Hum Kahan	**Imtiaz Ali And Sajid Ali – Amar Singh Chamkila**; Sneha Desai – Maharaj; Tahira Kashyap Khurrana – Sharmajee Ki Beti; Vijay Maurya – Mast Mein Rehne Ka; Yash Sahai – Kho Gaye Hum Kahan
Best Story (Web Original Film)
**Zoya Akhtar, Arjun Varain Singh, and Reema Kagti – Kho Gaye Hum Kahan**; Payal Arora and Vijay Maurya – Mast Mein Rehne Ka; Tahira Kashyap Khurrana – Sharmajee Ki Beti; Viraf Sarkari, Aniruddha Roy Chowdhury, and Ritesh Shah – Kadak Singh
Music Awards
Best Background Music (Series)	Best Original Soundtrack (Series)
**Sam Slater – The Railway Men**; Aman Pant – Guns & Gulaabs; Anurag Saikia – Panchayat (Season 3); Arabinda Neog – Gullak (Season 4); Arpit Mehta and Simran Hora – Kota Factory (Season 3); Benedict Taylor and Naren Chandavarkar – Heeramandi: The Diamond Bazaar	**Sanjay Leela Bhansali, Raja Hasan, and Sharmistha Chatterjee – Heeramandi: The Diamond Bazaar**; Amit Trivedi – Big Girls Don't Cry; Anurag Saikia – Panchayat (Season 3); Ikka and Sarthak Nakul – Jamnapaar; Ram Sampath – Tribhuvan Mishra: CA Topper; Sanchit Balhara and Ankit Balhara – The Railway Men
Best Background Music (Web Original Film)	Best Original Soundtrack (Web Original Film)
**A. R. Rahman – Amar Singh Chamkila**; Anurag Saikia – Mast Mein Rehne Ka; Shankar Ehsaan Loy and Jim Satya – The Archies; Shantanu Moitra – Kadak Singh; Sid Shirodkar – Kho Gaye Hum Kahan	**A. R. Rahman – Amar Singh Chamkila**; Shankar Ehsaan Loy, Ankur Tewari, DOT and The Islanders - The Archies; Shantanu Moitra – Kadak Singh; OAFF–Savera, Ankur Tewari, Sachin–Jigar, Achint Thakkar, Karan Kanchan and Rashmeet Kaur – Kho Gaye Hum Kahan
Technical Awards
Best Production Design (Series)	Best Cinematographer (Series)
**Subrata Chakraborty and Amit Roy – Heeramandi: The Diamond Bazaar**; Durgaprasad Mahapatra – Karmma Calling; Parichit A Paralkar – Guns & Gulaabs; Priya Suhass – Mumbai Diaries (Season 2); Rajat Poddar – The Railway Men; Sally White – Made in Heaven (Season 2)	**Sudeep Chatterjee, Mahesh Limaye, Huenstang Mohapatra, and Ragul Herian Dharuman – Heeramandi: The Diamond Bazaar**; Amitabha Singh – Panchayat (Season 3); Ewan Mulligan, Barny Crocker, and Dhananjay Navagrah – Kaala Paani; Malay Prakash – Mumbai Diaries (Season 2); Pankaj Kumar – Guns & Gulaabs; Rubais – The Railway Men
Best Costume Design (Series)	Best VFX (Series)
**Rimple, Harpreet Narula, and Chandrakant Sonawane – Heeramandi: The Diamond Bazaar**; Bhawna Sharma – Made in Heaven (Season 2); Bibi Zeeba Miraie – Bambai Meri Jaan; Karishma Vyas – Panchayat (Season 3); Neha R Bajaj – Guns & Gulaabs	**Film Gate AB & Hive Studios – The Railway Men**; Variate Studios – Mumbai Diaries (Season 2); Vinay Singh Chuphal (FutureWorks) – Heeramandi: The Diamond Bazaar; White Turtle Studios LLP, Hive FX Studio, and Black and White VFX Studios Private Limited – Ranneeti: Balakot & Beyond
Best Editing (Series)	Best Sound Design (Series)
**Yasha Jaidev Ramchandani – The Railway Men**; Amit Kulkarni – Panchayat (Season 3); Dev Rao Jadhav – Kaala Paani; Prashanth Ramachandran – Aspirants (Season 2); Sanjay Leela Bhansali – Heeramandi: The Diamond Bazaar; Sumeet Kotian – Guns & Gulaabs	**Allwin Rego & Sanjay Maurya – Kaala Paani**; Ankita Purkaystha and Sudeepta Sadhukhan – Kota Factory (Season 3); Manoj Sikka – Mumbai Diaries (Season 2); Sudeepta Sadhukhan & Ateesh Chattopadhyay –Panchayat (Season 3); Sanal George – Heeramandi: The Diamond Bazaar; Sanjay & Allwin – Guns & Gulaabs
Best Production Design (Web Original Film)	Best Cinematographer (Web Original Film)
**Suzanne Caplan Merwanji – The Archies**; Natasha Gauba – Kadak Singh; Prashant Rane, Ashok Lokare, and Boishali Sinha – Haddi; Sally White – Kho Gaye Hum Kahan; Suman Roy Mahapatra – Amar Singh Chamkila	**Sylvester Fonseca – Amar Singh Chamkila**; Avik Mukhopadhyay – Jaane Jaan; Avik Mukhopadhyay – Kadak Singh; Nagraj Ashokan Rathinam – Mast Mein Rehne Ka; Nikos Andritsakis – The Archies; Tanay Satam – Kho Gaye Hum Kahan
Best Editing (Web Original Film)	Best Sound Design (Web Original Film)
**Aarti Bajaj – Amar Singh Chamkila**; Arghyakamal Mitra – Kadak Singh; Nitin Baid – Kho Gaye Hum Kahan; Urvashi Saxena – Jaane Jaan; Zubin Sheikh – Bhakshak	**Dhiman Karmakar – Amar Singh Chamkila**; Anirban Sengupta – Jaane Jaan; Manav Shrotriya M.P.S.E – Haddi; Pranav Shukla – Kho Gaye Hum Kahan; Pranav Shukla – The Archies

=== Critics' Choice Awards ===
Best Series	Best Director (Series)
**Guns & Gulaabs – Netflix**	**Nikkhil Advani – Mumbai Diaries (Season 2)**
Best Actor (Male): Drama Series	Best Actor (Female): Drama Series
**Kay Kay Menon – Bambai Meri Jaan**	**Huma Qureshi – Maharani (Season 3)**
Best Web Original Film
**Jaane Jaan – Sujoy Ghosh**
Best Actor (Male): Film	Best Actor (Female): Film
**Jaideep Ahlawat – Jaane Jaan**	**Ananya Pandey – Kho Gaye Hum Kahan**

=== Special awards ===
Best Debut Director (Series)	Best Debut Director (Film)
**Shiv Rawai – The Railway Men**	**Arjun Varain Singh – Kho Gaye Hum Kahan**
Best Debut Male (Film)	Special Recognition (Film)
**Vedang Raina – The Archies**	**Arjun Varain Singh – Kho Gaye Hum Kahan**

=== Short Film Awards ===
Best Short Film	Best Director (Short Film)
**Deshkari**	**Jayaraj R – Vakuppu**
Best Actor (Male) : Short Film	Best Actor (Female) : Short Film
**Saurabh Sachdev – First Time**	**Madhura Gokarn – OCD**
Best Short Film (Popular)
**Satya**

== Superlatives ==
=== Nominations and wins by program ===
Nominations by program
Nominations	Program	Streaming Media
17	Heeramandi	Netflix
16	Panchayat (Season 3)	Amazon Prime Video
13	Kho Gaye Hum Kahan	Netflix
12	Guns & Gulaabs	Netflix
12	Amar Singh Chamkila	Netflix
11	The Railway Men	Netflix
11	Mast Mein Rehne Ka	Amazon Prime Video
11	Kadak Singh	ZEE5
9	Gullak (Season 4)	SonyLIV
9	Tribhuvan Mishra CA Topper	Netflix
8	Kaala Paani	Netflix
8	Jaane Jaan	Netflix
7	Kota Factory (Season 3)	Netflix
7	Made in Heaven (Season 2)	Amazon Prime Video
7	Mumbai Diaries (Season 2)	Amazon Prime Video
5	The Archies	Netflix
4	Sharmajee Ki Beti	Amazon Prime Video
4	Bhakshak	Netflix
3	Maamla Legal Hai	Netflix
3	Khufiya	Netflix
3	Maharaj	Netflix
3	Haddi	ZEE5
3	Shehar Lakhot	Amazon Prime Video
2	Bambai Meri Jaan	Amazon Prime Video
2	Hostel Daze (Season 3)	Amazon Prime Video
2	Killer Soup	Netflix
2	Murder Mubarak	Netflix
2	Scam 2003: The Telgi Story	SonyLIV
2	Sunflower (Season 2)	ZEE5
2	Ranneeti: Balakot & Beyond	JioCinema

Wins by program
Wins	Program	Streaming Media
10	Amar Singh Chamkila	Netflix
6	The Railway Men	Netflix
5	Heeramandi	Netflix
4	Guns & Gulaabs	Netflix
4	Kho Gaye Hum Kahan	Netflix
3	Kaala Paani	Netflix
3	Jaane Jaan	Netflix
2	Maamla Legal Hai	Netflix
2	The Archies	Netflix
2	Scam 2003: The Telgi Story	Sony Liv

=== Nominations and wins by streaming media ===
Nominations by streaming media
Nominations	Streaming Media
122	Netflix
60	Amazon Prime Video
17	ZEE5
13	SonyLIV
5	JioCinema
3	Disney+ Hotstar
2	MX Player

Wins by Streaming Media
Wins	Streaming Media
42	Netflix
4	Amazon Prime Video
4	Sony Liv

== See also ==
- Filmfare Awards
- 69th Filmfare Awards
- 2023 Filmfare OTT Awards
