= Kho Gaye Hum Kahan (soundtrack) =

2023 soundtrack album

Soundtrack album by OAFF–Savera, Sachin–Jigar, Ankur Tewari, Karan Kanchan, Rashmeet Kaur and Achint Thakkar
- Released: 18 December 2023
- Recorded: 2022–2023
- Genre: Feature film soundtrack
- Length: 20:35
- Language: Hindi
- Label: Zee Music Company
External audio
- Kho Gaye Hum Kahan - Full Album on YouTube

Kho Gaye Hum Kahan is the soundtrack album to the 2023 film of the same name directed by Arjun Varain Singh and produced by Excel Entertainment and Tiger Baby Films, starring Siddhant Chaturvedi, Ananya Panday and Adarsh Gourav. The soundtrack featured six songs composed by OAFF–Savera, Sachin–Jigar, Ankur Tewari, Karan Kanchan, Rashmeet Kaur and Achint Thakkar, with lyrics written by Javed Akhtar, Tewari, Dhrruv Yogi and Yashraj. The album was released under the Zee Music Company label on 18 December 2023.

== Background ==
Singh wanted the instrumentation to be organic in certain moments, and when the characters are navigating through social media, "it's got more of an electronic feel — it's got more of the synths". As a result, Singh wanted to blend those moments in the film's music.

OAFF–Savera, who previously scored Gehraiyaan (2022) which also starred Chaturvedi and Panday, also contributed two tracks for the film; the duo stated that they went ahead with an indie rock vibe unlike Gehraiyaan, which had an electro-acoustic vibe to it. Whereas, Sachin–Jigar, Ankur Tewari and Achint Thakkar composed one track each. Karan Kanchan and Rashmeet Kaur, jointly composed one song "Ishq Nachaawe" with rap portions written and performed by Yashraj. Besides composing, Tewari also wrote lyrics for three tracks. Siddharth Shirodkar, a schoolmate of Singh, had composed the film's background score. Adarsh Gourav, one of the film's lead actors, covered a reprise version of the song "Ishq Nachaawe".

== Release ==
The first song "Hone Do Jo Hota Hai" composed by OAFF–Savera, written by Javed Akhtar and performed by Savera and Lothika Jha, was released on 30 November 2023. It was then performed live on stage at the 14th edition of the NH7 Weekender music festival, which held from 1–3 December 2023 at Teerth Fields in Pune. The second song "I Wanna See You Dance", composed by the duo Sachin–Jigar and performed by Saba Azad was released on 15 December. After the music launch, the third song "Ishq Nachaawe" composed by Karan Kanchan and Rashmeet Kaur, who performed the song with rapper-songwriter Yashraj, was released on 21 December. The song was composed within 10 minutes. The fourth song "Teri Yeh Baatein" was released on 27 December. The title track composed and performed by Achint Thakkar, with lyrics written by Javed Akhtar was released on 8 January 2024.

The album was released on 18 December 2023 under the Zee Music Company label. The release coincided with a special launch event for the film's music and trailer, with the presence of the cast and crew, and featured live performances from the music team.

== Reception ==
Rahul Desai of Film Companion and Zinia Bandyopadhyay of India Today, described the music as "breezy" and "fills the room". Pratikshya Mishra of The Quint added that OAFF–Savera had "have outdone the magic of Doobey" with the film's music, while Sachin–Jigar and Ankur Tewari "also created a heady mix of Bollywood nostalgia and social media viral pop tracks". Rishil Jogani of Pinkvilla described the music as "vibrant and modern" and that "elevates the storytelling even further".

Sukanya Verma of Rediff.com described the album as "one of the best Hindi soundtracks of 2023" and ranked the title track as one among the "top Hindi songs of 2023"; she further added the song "is a sublime mix of retro genres and contemporary ambiance [...] It's instant love for the '80s pop feel in Kho Gaye Hum Kahan's title beauty and its part indie, part electronic, all mellow splendour." Joginder Tuteja of Bollywood Hungama described the soundtrack "also has a niche feel, just like the film" and called "Ishq Nachaawe" as the standout track from the album.

== Track listing ==
No.	Title	Lyrics	Music	Singer(s)	Length
1.	"Hone Do Jo Hota Hai"	Javed Akhtar	OAFF–Savera	Savera, Lothika Jha	3:03
2.	"I Wanna See You Dance"	Ankur Tewari	Sachin–Jigar	Saba Azad	2:42
3.	"Teri Yeh Baatein"	Ankur Tewari	OAFF–Savera	Savera	2:49
4.	"Baahon Mein Teri"	Ankur Tewari	Ankur Tewari	Ankur Tewari	4:43
5.	"Ishq Nachaawe"	Dhrruv Yogi, Yashraj	Karan Kanchan, Rashmeet Kaur	Rashmeet Kaur, Yashraj	3:41
6.	"Kho Gaye Hum Kahan"	Javed Akhtar	Achint Thakkar	Achint Thakkar	3:37
Total length:					20:35

== Accolades ==
Award	Date of ceremony	Category	Recipient(s)	Result	Ref(s)
Filmfare OTT Awards	1 December 2024	Best Original Soundtrack – Film	OAFF–Savera, Sachin–Jigar, Ankur Tewari, Karan Kanchan, Rashmeet Kaur and Achint Thakkar	Nominated	
Filmfare OTT Awards	1 December 2024	Best Background Music – Film	Siddharth Shirodkar	Nominated	
