= Saurabh Sachdeva =

Indian actor

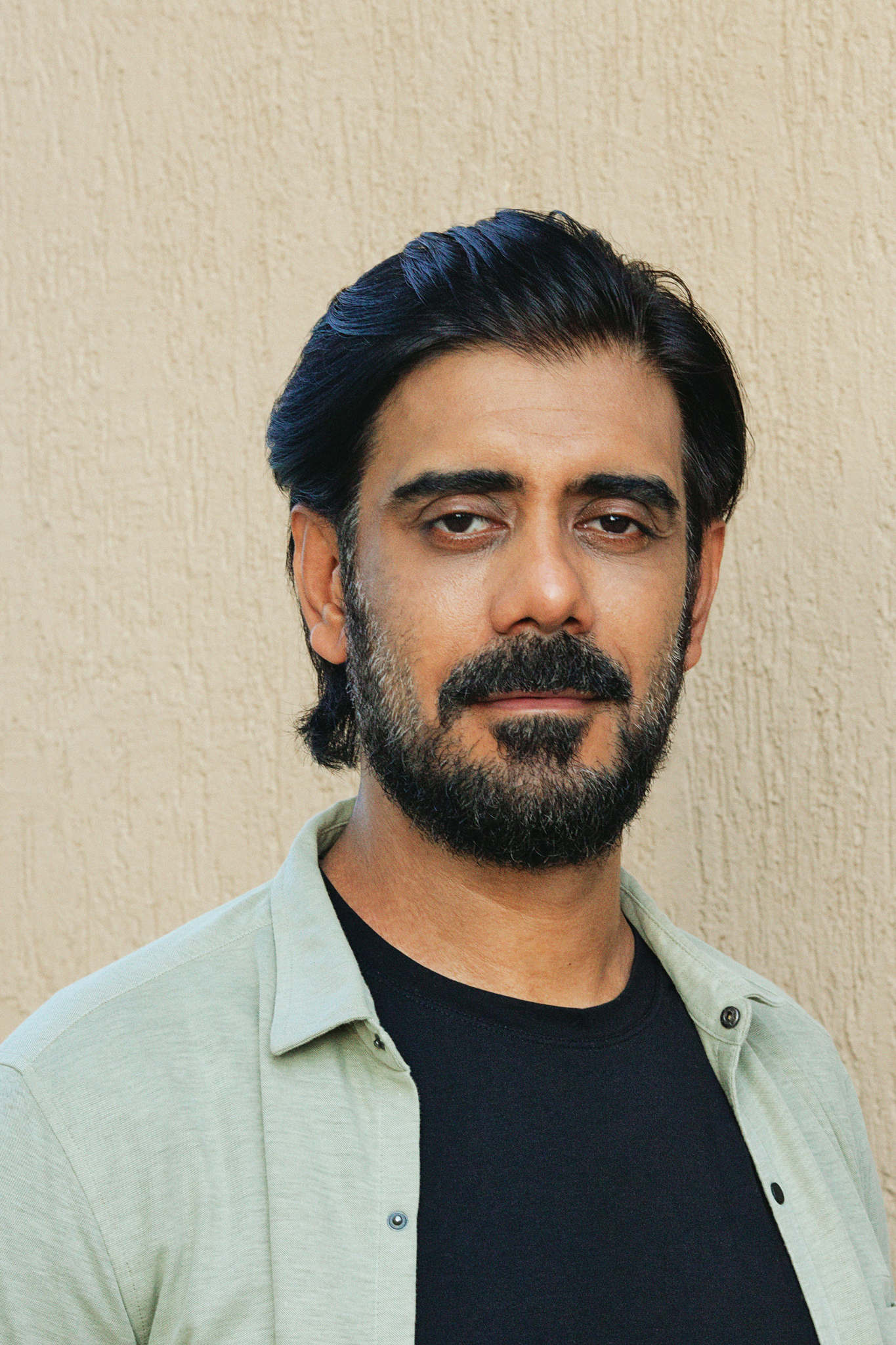
- Saurabh Sachdeva
- Born: September 24, 1978 (age 48); Haldwani, Uttarakhand, India
- Occupations: Actor; acting coach
- Years active: 2002–present

Saurabh Sachdeva is an Indian actor and acting coach who works predominantly in Hindi films. He started his film career in Maroon, which was released in 2016. He received critical acclaim for his character Suleiman Isa in the Netflix series Sacred Games in 2018. His notable filmography includes roles in Manmarziyaan (2018), Laal Kaptaan (2019), Housefull 4 (2019), Vadh (2022), Animal (2023), Haddi (2023), Kaala (2023), Bambai Meri Jaan (2023), Jaane Jaan (2023), Pushpa 2: The Rule (2024), and Eko (2025).

A veteran acting coach, he trained an array of actors including Rana Daggubati, Harshvardhan Rane, Freida Pinto, Anushka Sharma, Bobby Deol, John Abraham, Varun Dhawan, Raghav Juyal, Kubbra Sait, Richa Chadha, Dulquer Salmaan, Triptii Dimri, Avinash Tiwary, Arjun Kapoor, Jacqueline Fernandez, Asha Negi, Shakti Mohan, Rithvik Dhanjani, Abhishek Chauhan, and Mandana Karimi. In 2016, he directed a short film Gul which raises a question of priorities and showed at the Kerala International Film Festival. In 2017, Saurabh founded his own education and training institute, The Actors Truth, and theatre group Antarang in Mumbai.

== Early life ==
Saurabh Sachdeva was born on 24 September 1978 in a Punjabi family in Haldwani, Uttarakhand. He studied at Model Sr Secondary School Saket, Delhi. In 2001 he joined Barry John's Imago Acting School (now known as Barry John Acting Studio) where he started teaching in 2002. He worked with Imago Theatre Group until 2003 where he conceived and acted in street plays. In 2005, he joined Barry John Acting School in Mumbai where he spent 11 years as an acting coach.

== Filmography ==
Year	Title	Role	Notes
2017	Maroon	Inspector. R. Negi	
2018	Manmarziyaan	Kaka Ji	
2019	Laal Kaptaan	Army General	
2019	Housefull 4	Raazdaar	
2020	Taish	Sukhi	
2020	Raat Baaki Hai	Rehan Mustafa	
2021	Bhoot Police	Ullat Baba	
2022	Good Luck Jerry	Malik	
2022	Vadh	Prajapati Pandey	
2023	Haddi	Inder	
2023	Jaane Jaan	Ajit Mhatre	
2023	Animal	Abid Haque	
2024	Pushpa 2: The Rule	Hameed	Telugu film
2025	Badass Ravi Kumar	Awasthi	
2025	Thammudu	Agarwal	Telugu film
2025	Maalik	Chandrashekhar	
2025	Dhadak 2	Shankar	
2025	Baaghi 4	Paulo	
2025	Eko	Kuriachan	Malayalam film
2026	Satluj	Satnam Singh	
2026	Don't Trouble the Trouble	Prathap	Telugu film
2026	Ramayana: Part 1	Maricha	

=== Television ===
Year	Title	Role	Network
2018	Sacred Games	Suleiman Isa	Netflix
2023	Kaala	Colonel Himmat Singh Maan	Disney+ Hotstar
2023	Bambai Meri Jaan	Suleiman "Haji" Maqbool	Amazon Prime Video
2025	Bad Cop	DCP Aarif Khan	Disney+ Hotstar
