= Adarsh Gourav =

Indian actor (born 1994)

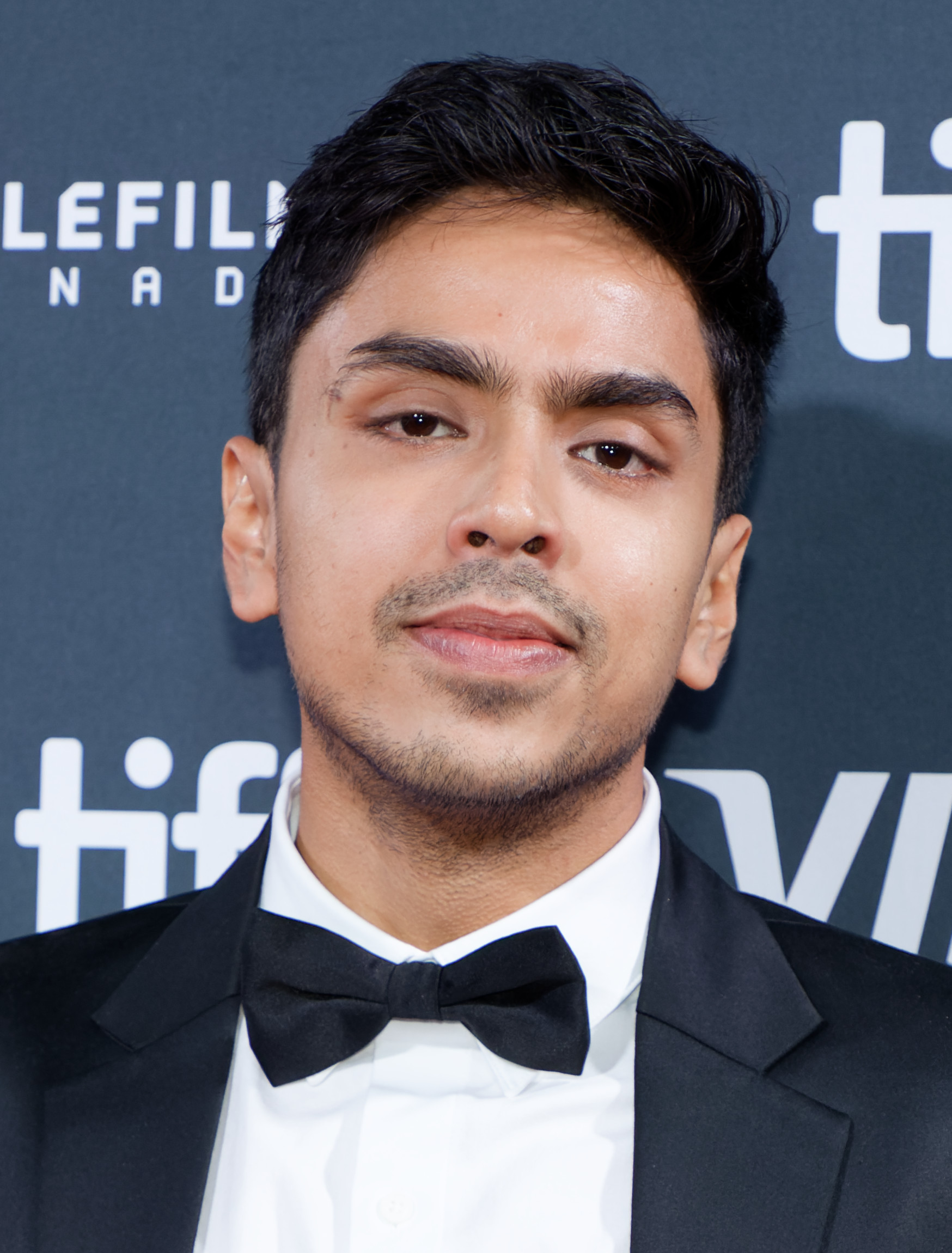
- Gourav at the 2024 Toronto International Film Festival
- Born: Adarsh Gourav Bhagavatula; 8 July 1994 (age 32); Jamshedpur, Bihar (present-day Jharkhand), India
- Occupation: Actor
- Years active: 2003–present

Adarsh Gourav Bhagavatula (born 8 July 1994) is an Indian actor known for his works in Hindi and English-language films and television series. Gourav began acting with the drama film My Name Is Khan (2010). He gained international recognition for playing chauffeur Balram Halwai in the satirical film The White Tiger (2021), which garnered him nominations for the BAFTA Award for Best Actor in a Leading Role and the Independent Spirit Award for Best Male Lead.

Adarsh has also starred in the teen comedy series Hostel Daze (2019–2021), the comic thriller series Guns & Gulaabs, and the drama film Kho Gaye Hum Kahan (both 2023).

== Early life and background ==
Adarsh Gourav Bhagavatula was born into a Telugu speaking family in Jamshedpur, Jharkhand. His father Satishnarayana Bhagavatula is from Srikakulam district and his mother Padmavati Bhagavatula hails from Vizianagaram in Andhra Pradesh. Gourav was brought up in Jamshedpur and studied in Loyola School, Jamshedpur. He later moved to Mumbai and studied at Narsee Monjee College. He had participated in Sa Re Ga Ma Pa in 2003 and L'il Champs in 2007 but was rejected from both.

In 2007, when Gourav's father, who was an employee of The Central Bank of India, got transferred to Mumbai, the family decided to relocate. He studied at the Lilavatibai Podar High School. While singing in the Kala Ghoda Arts Festival 2007, he was spotted and asked if he wanted to try acting. He agreed only because he was excited to be on television. After a year of auditioning, he was cast as the young Shahrukh Khan in the film My Name is Khan. He studied in The Drama School in Mumbai.

Gourav learnt Hindustani classical music for nine years under different Gurus. He started getting interested in Western music while in Junior college and sang for the college band "Steepsky". They recorded a single called "Good guys finish last". In college, he sang for a progressive rock band called "Oak Island" which was also featured in MTV Indies-Never Hide Sounds.

== Career ==
He was scouted to sing for Raell Padamsee's theatre company. He also sang for films like Black and White and Chal Chalein. Although his acting career began when he was 14, Adarsh seriously started pursuing acting when he was cast to play one of the primary characters in a film titled "Banana", produced by John Abraham Entertainment and directed by Sajid Ali. While in his final year of college at Narsee Monjee College of Commerce, he worked with Anurag Kashyap in his anthology short film "Clean Shaven" with Radhika Apte. The next year he was cast as the lead in Rukh alongside Manoj Bajpayee and as one of the antagonists in Sridevi's Mom. To work on his craft, he took a break and went to The Drama School Mumbai in 2016. After finishing school, he worked in the Amazon production "Die Trying" and the TVF production Hostel Daze. He also played Prince Tarquin in the NCPA production "Lucrece" directed by Paul Goodwin in 2017. In 2018, he worked with Academy nominee Deepa Mehta on her Netflix series Leila.

After a few months of not being able to find any acting work, he was called in for an audition of The White Tiger. His portrayal of Balram Halwai in the Netflix film has been lauded by all as the "star of Ramin Bahrani's film", with the Evening Standard saying, "Gourav is nuanced and utterly engaging as Balram Halwai, a bright peasant who morphs from lickspittle chauffeur into something more ruthless." and Variety calling it a "small marvel". The Telegraph said Gourav "gives the definition of a breakthrough performance" The Entertainment Weekly called him "a largely unknown actor whose soulful combination of sheer will and vulnerability should, in a just world, win him the kind of accolades that helped make Slumdog's Dev Patel a star. For his performance, Gourav was nominated for the Film Independent Spirit Award for Best Male Lead and was also nominated for the BAFTA for Best Actor.

In May 2023, he was a part of Audible's podcast series called Desi Down Under, along with Taaruk Raina and Prajakta Koli. The story is set in Sydney about three 20 year olds from Mangalore who go to Australia to learn surf-lifesaving skills at Coogee Beach. Following this, he starred alongside Siddhant Chaturvedi and Ananya Panday in the coming-of-age film Kho Gaye Hum Kahan directed by debutant Arjun Varain Singh. Writing for NDTV, Saibal Chatterjee reviewed "Siddhant Chaturvedi has the meatiest role in Kho Gaye Hum Kahan but it is Adarsh Gourav who makes the biggest impact".

Gourav had his first major leading role with the 2026 survival thriller Tu Yaa Main from director Bejoy Nambiar. An adaptation of the 2018 Thai film The Pool, it starred him opposite newcomer Shanaya Kapoor as an aspiring rapper from a Mumbai suburb who enters into a relationship with an elite social media influencer but has to fend off with her against a crocodile let loose around a rundown resort in Goa. Although an underperformer at the box office, the film and Gourav's performance earned praise, with The Hollywood Reporter India's Rahul Desai remarking that he "effortlessly slips into the ‘tapori’ zone without reducing the silver-tongued Maharashtrian hustler to a type".

== Filmography ==
Key
†	Denotes films that have not yet been released

=== Films ===
Year	Title	Role	Notes
2010	My Name is Khan	Teenage Rizwan	
2016	Madly	Allwyn	Anthology segment: "Clean Shaven"
2017	Rukh	Dhruv	
2017	Mom	Mohit "Bunty" Chadda	
2021	The White Tiger	Balram Halwai	
2022	Kiss	Sam	Short film
2023	Kho Gaye Hum Kahan	Neil Pereira	
2024	Woh Bhi Din The	Joyjeet "Joy" Ganguly	
2025	Superboys of Malegaon	Nasir	
2026	Tu Yaa Main	Maruti Kadam alias "Aala Flowpara"	

=== Television ===
Year	Title	Role	Notes
2003	Sa Re Ga Ma Pa	Contestant	Eliminated
2007	Sa Re Ga Ma Pa L'il Champs	Contestant	Eliminated
2018	Die Trying	Jason	
2019	Leila	Naz Chaudhary	
2019–2021	Hostel Daze	Ankit Pandey	
2023	Extrapolations	Gaurav	
2023	Guns & Gulaabs	Jugnu/Chhotu Ganchi	
2025	Alien: Earth	Slightly	

== Awards and nominations ==
Year	Award	Category	Nominated Work	Result	Ref.
2021	AACTA International Awards	Best Actor	The White Tiger	Nominated	
2021	British Academy Film Awards	Best Actor in a Leading Role	The White Tiger	Nominated	
2021	Independent Spirit Awards	Best Male Lead	The White Tiger	Nominated	
2021	Filmfare OTT Awards	Best Actor in a Comedy Series	Hostel Daze	Nominated	
2024	Filmfare OTT Awards	Best Actor in a Web Original Film	Kho Gaye Hum Kahan	Nominated	
2024	Indian Film Festival of Melbourne	Disruptor in Cinema	—N/a	Won	
