= Jaane Jaan (2023 film) =

2023 Indian film by Sujoy Ghosh

- Official release poster
- Directed by: Sujoy Ghosh
- Written by: Dialogues: Sujoy Ghosh; Raj Vasant
- Screenplay by: Sujoy Ghosh
- Based on: The Devotion of Suspect X by Keigo Higashino
- Produced by: Jay Shewakramani; Akshai Puri; Hyunwoo Thomas Kim; Shobha Kapoor; Ekta Kapoor
- Starring: Kareena Kapoor Khan; Jaideep Ahlawat; Vijay Varma
- Cinematography: Avik Mukhopadhyay
- Edited by: Urvashi Saxena
- Music by: Songs: Sachin–Jigar; Score: Clinton Cerejo
- Production companies: Balaji Motion Pictures; 12th Street Entertainment; Northern Lights Films; Kross Pictures; Boundscript; Miracle Pictures
- Distributed by: Netflix
- Release date: 21 September 2023
- Running time: 139 minutes
- Country: India
- Language: Hindi

Jaane Jaan (transl. Beloved), released internationally as Suspect X, is a 2023 Indian Hindi-language mystery thriller film written and directed by Sujoy Ghosh. The film is an adaptation of the 2005 Japanese novel The Devotion of Suspect X by Keigo Higashino, which had earlier been made into the 2012 South Korean film Perfect Number by Bang Eun-jin. The film is produced under the banner 12th Street Entertainment and Northern Lights Films in association with Kross Pictures and Balaji Motion Pictures. It stars Kareena Kapoor Khan as a single mother involved in a murder, alongside Jaideep Ahlawat and Vijay Varma. It released on 21 September 2023 on Netflix, to positive reviews from film critics, with particular praise directed towards the performances of the lead cast.

Jaane Jaan broke the record for the biggest opening weekend viewership for an Indian film on Netflix. It was the highest-ranking Indian film on Netflix's engagement report for the second half of 2023, with over 20 million views, and emerged as the most-viewed Indian film on Netflix in terms of global viewing hours.

At the 2024 Filmfare OTT Awards, Jaane Jaan received 8 nominations, including Best Web Original Film, Best Director in a Web Original Film (for Ghosh), Best Actor in a Web Original Film (for Ahlawat), and Best Supporting Actor in a Web Original Film (for Varma), and won 3 awards – Best Web Original Film (Critics), Best Actor (Critics) in a Web Original Film (for Ahlawat) and Best Actress in a Web Original Film (for Kapoor Khan).

== Plot ==
In Kalimpong, northern West Bengal, Maya D'Souza is a single mother who runs a cafeteria. Naren Vyas is a reclusive, but brilliant mathematics teacher, who lives next door to Maya and her teenage daughter Tara. Naren is solemn and introverted, though well-liked amongst his students, and his morning exchanges with Maya from whose cafeteria he buys lunch, is the brightest part of his day.

Ajit, Maya's abusive estranged husband and a corrupt policeman, shows up one night to extort money from her which she stole when fleeing from him 14 years ago. He threatens both her and Tara, causing the situation to quickly escalate into violence and Ajit is killed by them via strangulation, partly in self-defense. Overhearing the commotion and deducing that Ajit has been killed, Naren offers his help to the mother and daughter. He not only disposes the body, but also plots the cover-up step-by-step.

Inspector Karan Anand, a former classmate of Naren, is assigned to track the missing Ajit, which leads him to Kalimpong. There, he runs into Naren, along with burned remains with Ajit's credentials. Karan's suspicions immediately fall on Maya. Autopsy shows that the murder occurred on the 10 of the month. Maya and Tara have a detailed alibi. Unable to poke any holes in Maya's alibi, Karan is ready to go back. However, one of Maya's employees tells him about Naren's crush on Maya. Karan becomes suspicious of Naren, who had previously claimed to not know Maya very well. Karan finds incriminating evidence against Naren, who does not have an alibi for the night of the murder.

Maya apologises to Naren when she finds out what her employee said. She tells him that she clarified to Karan that there is nothing romantic between them. A heartbroken Naren goes to the police station and confesses to Ajit's murder, saying he did it at Maya's behest. Naren starts to frame himself as delusional, setting up evidence of him stalking Maya. Maya confirms the evidence, including cryptic messages sent to her. The murder weapon is also found in Naren's house. Karan accepts that Naren killed Ajit in a delusional state to protect Maya and Tara.

At the police station, a guilt-ridden Maya asks Naren why he took the blame for her. Naren reveals that he had spent 10 years of his life on one of the Millennium Prize Problems, which he solved. However, someone else had reached the solution 46 hours before him. Depressed, he was going to commit suicide. Right then, Maya had knocked on Naren's door, giving him a new lease on life. A grateful Maya offers to visit him in prison but Naren refuses, wanting her and Tara to move on in peace.

In a flashback, it shows how Naren covered up the murder. Since Ajit's murder occurred on the 9th and Maya did not have an alibi for then, he killed a homeless man on the 10th, a day Maya and Tara had meticulously created an alibi. Karan had previously noted that the burned remains had a smashed face and burned fingerprints to hide Ajit's identity so the body would not be connected to Maya. In reality, it was done to make sure that no one would realise that the dead body was not Ajit's.

Naren is sentenced to 25 years in prison, which he uses to solve another of the Millennium Problems.

== Cast ==
- Kareena Kapoor Khan as Maya D'Souza (née Soneeya Tawde), owner of Tiffin Lounge & Bar in Kalimpong.
  - Uditi Singh as young Soneeya Tawde (cameo appearance) who works at Shabnam Dance Bar, Bombay
- Jaideep Ahlawat as Naren "Naru" Vyas, gold medalist and PhD in Mathematics, Maths teacher at Mount George School, Kalimpong. An expert practitioner and red belt in Jujitsu.
- Vijay Varma as Inspector Karan Anand, Chief investigating officer of Mumbai police in disappearance case of Ajit Mhatre, expert practitioner of Kurash, college friend of Naren Vyas.
- Saurabh Sachdeva as ASI Ajit Mhatre. Maya's husband, Tara's father
- Lin Laishram as Prema Kami, a waitress and Maya's colleague at Tiffin Lounge & Bar, Kalimpong.
- Naisha Khanna as Tara D'Souza, daughter of Maya and Ajit Mhatre

== Production ==
=== Development ===
Ghosh started working on the script in 2015 and wanted Saif Ali Khan and Aishwarya Rai Bachchan to be cast. However, was shelved. According to him, the film belonged to the crime thriller. He stated that the day he read ‘Devotion of Suspect X,’ he wanted to adapt it into a film. On casting Khan for the character of Maya in the film, Ghosh opined that he needed somebody at that age and to be fearless. Fearless in terms of whatever she had to do, however she had to look, completely ignore any kind of vanity or anything, including a vanity van. He wrote the character of Maya as a single mom, who works and takes care of her child, has no time for herself. Also, they wanted Maya to wear one costume (jacket) during the whole film, depicting she did not have time. Also, Ghosh did not wanted the film similar to that of the original, citing it 'non-palatable' to Indian audience. He interpreted it more of a man's unrequited love for a woman rather than a murder-mystery. On opting for Kalimpong for filming, he said that the misty weather and silence suited the film's subject. On writing the character for Khan, he said there were certain requirements like Maya being a single mother who's running a cafe, who's looking after a kid, who's 24 hours kind of working in a cycle. There were certain things she couldn't afford, like even to deck herself up, or she has to be just a normal mother.

In an interview with The Indian Express, Ahlawat said that he was about to refuse the role. Ghosh was particular on aspects like he was making this film for a Hindi speaking audience and thus, characters that fit within our social norms, their behaviour had to be something that this audience could relate with.

=== Casting ===
Ghosh stated that most of the casting evolved from the original book, the character Naren was heavily built, knows martial arts and was interested in Mathematics. A careless attitude about living life where he felt Jaideep Ahlawat fitted. For Inspector Karan's character, he wanted someone who can be super cool and charming, thus roped in Vijay Varma. Whereas for Maya's character, he was certain to cast a popular actor. In a conversation with Firstpost, Varma was quoted saying: "Jaane Jaan was a film I jumped at the minute Ghosh shared that he wanted me to play a role like this. I am playing a witty, charming and sharp police officer, refreshing break from the baddies I’ve played before."

=== Filming ===
Principal photography commenced from May 2022, with the first schedule in Kalimpong and Darjeeling. As per Ghosh, the place aided the intrigue in its protagonist, a woman who was also restarting her life away from prying eyes, needed a quiet space which has an element of mystery. Further, he added that while creating a character, he had to create their world, where one could see Khan's character with single telephone, in a sleepy town where everyone knows everyone, that environment where people care about each other. In the film, Karan's colleague, who is from the same town, doesn't see Maya as a suspect because he has seen her out and about as a single mother for years.

=== Marketing and release ===
On 25 August 2023, the teaser with a release date was announced by Netflix. The makers planned to release the film on 21 September 2023, which was the birthday of the film's lead actress, Kareena Kapoor Khan. The film was selected to be screened at the Himalayan Film Festival 2023.

== Soundtrack ==
The original songs for the film were composed by Sachin-Jigar whereas the background score was composed by Clinton Cerejo and Bianca Gomes. For the title track, Sachin-Jigar recreated the composition "Aa Jaane Jaan" from the 1969 film Intaqam. The recreated version was recorded with vocals by Neha Kakkar. Visuals from the original compositions were used in the film. Vijay Ganguly had choreographed the dance number. The song featured in the first teaser of the film. In the film, Maya (played by Kapoor) sang the track at a dance bar with young Maya (played by Uditi Singh) performing a pole dance in short golden dress. In his character as an inspector, Varma was filmed as a visitor at the bar with Maya's live performance. The title track was released on 11 September 2023. The second single "Doriyaan" was released on 18 September 2023.

All music is composed by Sachin-Jigar.

Jaane Jaan (Original Motion Picture Soundtrack) - EP
No.	Title	Lyrics	Singer(s)	Length
1.	"Jaane Jaan - Title Track"	Rajendra Krishan	Neha Kakkar	2:20
2.	"Doriyaan"	Priya Saraiya	Arijit Singh	3:35
Total length:				5:55

== Reception ==
=== Viewership ===
During 18–24 September 2023, Jaane Jaan was the most-watched non-English film on Netflix globally with 8.1 million views. The film had the biggest opening weekend viewership for an Indian film with 18.8 million viewing hours from 8.1 million views. It was trending at number-one in 13 countries and was among the top ten most-watched films across 52 countries. With 20.2 million views in the second half of 2023, it became the most-watched Indian film and the 83rd most watched film on Netflix globally. It also emerged as the years most-viewed Indian film on Netflix in terms of global viewing hours.

=== Critical response ===
Jaane Jaan received positive reviews from film critics with particular praise directed towards the performance of the main cast. On the review aggregator website Rotten Tomatoes, 78% of 9 critics' reviews are positive, with an average rating of 4.5/10.

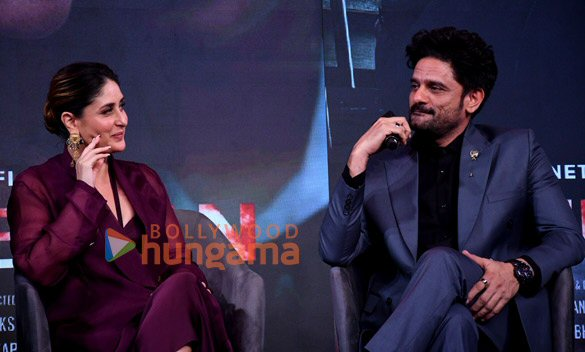
Kapoor Khan (left) and Ahlawat (right) received praise for their performances.

Saibal Chatterjee from NDTV rated 3.5 out of 5 stars praising the plot of the film and called, "With the writer-director, the technicians, the music team and the actors at their very best, Jaane Jaan is an all-round triumph." Devesh Sharma from Filmfare rated 3.5/5 stars and wrote, "The film rests hugely on the shoulders of its three principal protagonists. You tend to sympathise with the protagonists, wanting them to win, wanting them to stretch their bluff till the very end. Watch the film for the masterful performances by Varma, Ahlawat and Kapoor Khan". Rishil Jogani from Pinkvilla rated 3.5/5 stars and opined, "Jaane Jaan is a great adaptation of the book, 'The Devotion Of Suspect X'. It is a must watch for those who enjoy films in the thriller space. It is also strongly recommended for all those who haven't read the book or watched the Japanese adaptation of the book."

Sukanya Verma from Rediff rated 3.5/5 stars and opined, "In Jaane Jaan, the director sets the rules where subtext is spoiler and everybody must reveal themselves without disclosing anything. All his three lead actors rise to that challenge spectacularly and share numerous stories to be read in between the lines." Anvita Singh from India Today rated 3.5/5 stars and stated, "When you have a solid screenplay to rely on, it is half the battle won for everyone involved. Then all you need to do is cast the right actors. In 'Jaane Jaan's' case, both these demands were met by Sujoy Ghosh ably." Bollywood Hungama rated the film 3 stars and stated, "Jaane Jaan is a gripping film and works due to the execution, unexpected twists and turns and terrific performances of Kareena Kapoor Khan, Jaideep Ahlawat and Vijay Varma."

Times of India rated with 3/5 stars and wrote, "If you have an affinity for the kind of cinema that exudes a melancholic, enigmatic, and contemplative atmosphere, Jaane Jaan will strike a chord with you. However, the film falls short of keeping up with the grip and fast pace of the book that was unputdownable." Lachmi Deb Roy from First Post rated 3/5 stars and wrote, "The story is unique, engaging and the best thing about it is the minute details that he has paid attention to starting from the look of the apartments to the look of the actors. Kapoor have done justice to her role trying to show the hardships of a single mother and the stress that she goes through because of her dark past. both Ahlawat and Varma have slayed their roles to perfection."

== Accolades ==
Award	Date of the ceremony	Category	Recipients	Result	Ref.
Filmfare OTT Awards	1 December 2024	Best Web Original Film	Jaane Jaan	Nominated	
Filmfare OTT Awards	1 December 2024	Best Web Original Film (Critics)	Jaane Jaan	Won	
Filmfare OTT Awards	1 December 2024	Best Director in a Web Original Film	Sujoy Ghosh	Nominated	
Filmfare OTT Awards	1 December 2024	Best Actor in a Web Original Film	Jaideep Ahlawat	Nominated	
Filmfare OTT Awards	1 December 2024	Best Actor (Critics) in a Web Original Film	Jaideep Ahlawat	Won	
Filmfare OTT Awards	1 December 2024	Best Actress in a Web Original Film	Kareena Kapoor Khan	Won	
Filmfare OTT Awards	1 December 2024	Best Supporting Actor in a Web Original Film	Vijay Varma	Nominated	
Filmfare OTT Awards	1 December 2024	Best Cinematographer (Web Original Film)	Avik Mukhopadhyay	Nominated	
Filmfare OTT Awards	1 December 2024	Best Editing (Web Original Film)	Urvashi Saxena	Nominated	
Filmfare OTT Awards	1 December 2024	Best Sound Design (Web Original Film)	Anirban Sengupta	Nominated	

== See also ==
- List of Netflix India originals
- List of Hindi films of 2023
- Kolaigaran, a 2019 Indian Tamil film, an unofficial remake of the South Korean film
