= Ashok Pathak =

Indian film actor

- Born: Siwan, Bihar
- Occupation: Actor
- Years active: 2012–present
- Known for: Panchayat

Ashok Pathak is an Indian actor. He is best known for his role of Binod in the TV series Panchayat. He began his career with film of Bittu Boss. In 11 years of his acting journey, he has acted in films and web shows, including Bittoo Boss, Shanghai, The Field, Saat Uchakkey, A Death in the Gunj, Pakauu Class of 83, Sacred Games, Wild Wild Punjab, Aarya (TV series), Kathmandu Connection 2 and Guns of Benaras.

In 2022, he acted in the Punjabi film Khaao Piyo Aish Karo. He played the role of a doctor in the movie Wild Wild Punjab. Ashok and his family migrated from Bihar to Hissar, Haryana for work. In 2024, Pathak played Dhaincha Jha in the Netflix series Tribhuvan Mishra: CA Topper.

== Film ==
Year	Film	Role	Language	Notes	Ref
2012	Bittoo Boss	Bicky	Hindi		
2012	Shanghai	Auto Driver	Hindi		
2012	Shudra: The Rising	Jagan	Hindi		
2015	The Second Best Exotic Marigold Hotel	Scorpion Tuk-Tuk Driver	English		
2016	A Death in the Gunj	Maniya	English		
2016	Saat Uchakkey	Gulaab	Hindi		
2017	Vekh Baraatan Challiyan	Birju	Punjabi		
2017	Fukrey Returns	Smackiya	Hindi		
2018	Golak Bugni Bank Te Batua	Chandan	Punjabi		
2018	102 Not Out	Rickshaw driver	Hindi		
2019	Photograph	Gopal (Taxi Driver)	Hindi		
2019	Kala Shah Kala	Dhaba Owner	Punjabi		
2019	Jhootha Kahin Ka	Tommy Pandey Sidekick	Hindi		
2019	Khandaani Shafakhana	Bangali Baba	Hindi		
2019	Tara Mira	Kisna	Punjabi		
2020	Guns of Banaras	Suleman	Hindi		
2022	Mahi Mera Nikka Jeha	Prem Kulchewala	Punjabi		
2023	Kade Dade Diyan Kade Pote Diyan	Unmentioned	Punjabi		
2024	Wild Wild Punjab	Doctor	Hindi		
2024	Sister Midnight	Gopal	Hindi		
2024	Panchhi		Punjabi		
2025	Pind Peya Sara Zombieland Baneya	Chango Pandey	Punjabi		

== Television ==
Year	Web Series / TV Series	Role	Platform	Language	Notes	Ref
2017	Pushpavalli	T Boy	Amazon Prime Video	Hindi		
2017-2018	Sacred Games	Rafi (Supporting role)	Netflix	Hindi		
2020	Class of '83	Naik Jr.	Netflix	Hindi		
2021	Chalo Koi Baat Nahi	Maldives	SonyLIV	Hindi		
2021	Modi: Journey of a Common Man	Waiter	SonyLIV	Hindi		
2021	Aarya	Gopi	Disney+ Hotstar	Hindi		
2022-2025	Panchayat	Binod	Amazon Prime Video	Hindi		
2022	Rangbaaz	Brijesh Gupta	ZEE5	Hindi		
2022	Kathmandu Connection	Fazlu	SonyLIV	Hindi		
2024	Tribhuvan Mishra CA Topper	Dhaincha	MX Player	Hindi		
