= Pad Gaye Pange =

2024 Indian drama film

- Theatrical release poster
- Directed by: Santosh Kumar
- Written by: Manish Kumar
- Story by: Manish Kumar
- Produced by: Gautam Sharma; Yogesh Lakhani
- Starring: Samarpan Singh; Faisal Malik; Rajesh Sharma; Rajpal Yadav; Rrajesh Yadav
- Cinematography: Pratap Chandra Rout
- Edited by: Pawan Kainth; Biren Mohanty
- Music by: Dhawal Tandon
- Production companies: Prachi Films; Utter Action
- Release date: 30 August 2024
- Running time: 118 minutes
- Country: India
- Language: Hindi

Pad Gaye Pange is a 2024 Indian Hindi-language comedy film directed by Santosh Kumar, featuring Samarpan Singh, Rajesh Sharma, Faisal Malik, Rajpal Yadav and Rrajesh Yadav.

== Synopsis ==
Pad Gaye Pange follows Shastri Ji, a retired teacher living with his son and daughter-in-law in a home filled with memories of his late wife. Tensions rise as his daughter-in-law, Madhu, becomes frustrated with the lack of privacy. The story takes a twist when Shastri Ji and his former student, Aayush, are both mistakenly diagnosed with terminal cancer. This leads them on a chaotic journey involving a suicide attempt, a bank fraud, and the shocking revelation that their diagnosis was an error.

== Cast ==
- Samarpan Singh as Aayush
- Rajesh Sharma as Shastri Ji
- Rajpal Yadav as Captain Jahaaz Singh
- Rrajesh Yadav as Jaggu
- Faisal Malik as Bhaiya Ji
- Varsha Rekhate as Charu

== Production ==
Pad Gaye Pange is directed by Santosh Kumar and produced by Gautam Sharma and Yogesh Lakhani, under the banners of Prachi Films and Utter Action Pad Gaye Pange is set to release in theaters on August 30, 2024. The official poster for Pad Gaye Pange was unveiled on 8 August 2024.
