= Mahodiya =

Village in Madhya Pradesh, India

- Location in Madhya Pradesh, India Mahodiya (India)
- Coordinates: 23°12′N 77°05′E
- Country: India
- State: Madhya Pradesh
- District: Sehore

Population (2011)
  - Total: 1,919

Mahodiya is a village located in the Sehore district of the Indian state of Madhya Pradesh. It is about 10 kilometers from the district headquarters Sehore, and about 50 kilometers from the state capital Bhopal.

== Demographics ==
As per the 2011 census, it has a population of 1919, in 375 households.

== In popular culture ==
- The TV show Panchayat was filmed here.
