= Faisal Malik =

Indian actor (born 1980)

- Born: 18 February 1980 (age 46) prayagraj, Uttar Pradesh, India
- Occupation: Actor
- Years active: 2012–present
- Known for: Panchayat; Gangs of Wassepur Part 2

Faisal Malik (born 18 February 1980) is an Indian actor, best known for his role of Prahladcha (or chacha) "Prahlad" Pandey in Amazon Prime Video's Panchayat, Fraud Saiyaan, Black Widows and Anurag Kashyap's Gangs of Wasseypur Part 2. Ariyippu directed by Mahesh Narayanan was his Malayalam debut.

== Early life ==
Faisal Malik hails from Prayagraj and left the city to become an actor in Bollywood. He has worked as an assistant director, promo producer, reality show producer, and line producer.

== Career ==
While Malik had a brief stint acting in the 2012 film Gangs of Wasseypur, he gained fame after his role as Prahlad in the web-series Panchayat.

He has co-produced web-series such as ‘Smoke’, ‘Revolver Rani’ and ‘Main aur Charles’.

== Filmography ==
Key
†	Denotes films that have not yet been released

=== Films ===
Year	Title	Role	Ref.
2012	Gangs of Wasseypur – Part 2	Inspector Gopal Singh	
2019	Fraud Saiyaan	Inspector	
2020	Ariyippu	Dinesh Singh	Malayalam movie
2023	Mast Mein Rehne Ka	Baburam	
2024	Dedh Bigha Zameen	Police Inspector	
2024	Pad Gaye Pange	Bhaiya ji	
2024	Jo Tera Hai Woh Mera Hai	Rajan	
2025	Maa	Bhugwa	
2025	Thamma	Inspector P. K. Yadav	
2026	Subedaar	Softy Bhaiya	
2026	Ramayana: Part 1	Kumbhakarna	
2028	Ramayana: Part 2 †	Kumbhakarna	

=== Web series ===
Year	Title	Role	Notes	Ref.
2020	Black Widows	Inspector Bholey		
2020-2025	Panchayat	Prahlad Pandey	Season 1, 2, 3 and 4	
2024	Tribhuvan Mishra: CA Topper	Police Inspector Haider Ali	Season 1	
2024	Swipe Crime	Prof Kapil Khatra		
2026	Teen Kauwe †	TBA	Amazon Prime Video series	

== Awards and nominations ==
Year	Award	Category	Work	Result	Ref.
2023	Critics’ Choice Shorts and Series Awards	Best Supporting Actor	Panchayat	Won	
2023	Hitlist OTT Awards	Best Supporting Actor - Male	Panchayat	Nominated	
2023	Hitlist OTT Awards	Best Supporting Actor - Male	Panchayat	Nominated	
2023	Iconic Gold Awards	Best Supporting Actor of the Year	Panchayat	Nominated	
