= Lilavatibai Podar High School =

School in Maharashtra, India

Smt. Lilavatibai Podar High School, (LPHS), is a co-educational, English medium institution for grades 1 through 12. It is a private, ICSE, unaided, independent, day-boarding school, registered with the state of Maharashtra. LPHS is located at Ramee Emerald Building, Near Shamrao Vitthal Bank, SV Road, Khar, Mumbai, Maharashtra, 400052.

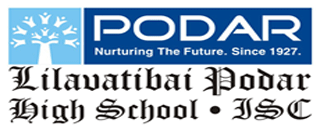

There are approximately 5000 students in the school (as of 2/22/23).

The school was founded in 1927 by Shri Ganesh Narayan Podar. It has classes from pre-primary up to Std. XII ISC and is affiliated to the Council for the Indian School Certificate Examinations, New Delhi.

== History ==
The Educational Complex was founded by Anandilal Podar in 1927. In 1930, Mahatma Gandhi and Mr. Jamnalal Bajaj, owing to their political pre-occupation, retired from the trusteeship of the society, and Mr. Madan Mohan Malviya became the president of the society, till his death in 1946. Thereafter, the society was guided by Raja Ramdeo Anandilal Podar.

Lilavatibai Podar High School, is a co-educational English medium, unaided institution founded in 1987 by Late Shri Ganesh Narayan Podar.

== Format ==
LPHS offers the standard ICSE curriculum. The campus includes a five-floor main building, the Ramniranjan Podar Hall, and a field equipped with sporting equipment.

== Houses and Student Council ==
The school follows a house system where students are grouped into 4 houses. These are:

- Raman (red)
  After the scientist C. V. Raman
- Swami Vivekananda (yellow)
  Named after Swami Vivekananda
- Tagore (green)
  Named after Rabindranath Tagore.
- Gandhi (blue)
  A tribute to Mahatma Gandhi.

Interhouse competitions are held regularly. The school holds inter-house competitions and an annual prize distribution ceremony. In addition to these intra-school events, interschool competitions, events, and social drives are also organized. Each house typically has its own set of house captains and vice-captains.

The Student Council at LPHS comprises The ISC Student Council, The ICSE Student Council, and House Prefects in lower grades.

The council members are elected through a series of rigorous rounds testing their suitability and merit.
