= Kho Gaye Hum Kahan =

2023 Indian film by Arjun Varain Singh

- Official release poster
- Directed by: Arjun Varain Singh
- Written by: Arjun Varain Singh; Zoya Akhtar; Reema Kagti; Yash Sahai
- Produced by: Zoya Akhtar; Reema Kagti; Ritesh Sidhwani; Farhan Akhtar
- Starring: Siddhant Chaturvedi; Ananya Panday; Adarsh Gourav
- Cinematography: Tanay Satam
- Edited by: Nitin Baid
- Music by: Songs: OAFF–Savera; Ankur Tewari; Sachin–Jigar; Achint Thakkar; Karan Kanchan; Rashmeet Kaur; Background Score: Sid Shirodkar
- Production companies: Excel Entertainment; Tiger Baby Films
- Distributed by: Netflix
- Release date: 26 December 2023
- Running time: 135 minutes
- Country: India
- Language: Hindi

Kho Gaye Hum Kahan (transl. Where Have We Lost Ourselves?) is a 2023 Indian Hindi-language coming-of-age buddy drama film directed by Arjun Varain Singh, in his directorial debut. Written by Singh, Zoya Akhtar, Reema Kagti and produced by Ritesh Sidhwani, Akhtar, Kagti, and Farhan Akhtar under the banners of Excel Entertainment and Tiger Baby Films, the film stars Siddhant Chaturvedi, Ananya Panday, and Adarsh Gourav as three friends who navigate their goals and relationships against the pressures of social media. Kalki Koechlin, Anya Singh and Rohan Gurbaxani appear in supporting roles.

The film is named after a song of the same name from the film Baar Baar Dekho (2016), also produced by Excel Entertainment. Principal photography of the film began in March 2022 and was wrapped up in August 2023. The film was released on Netflix on 26 December 2023.

At the 2024 Filmfare OTT Awards, Kho Gaye Hum Kahan received 13 nominations, including Best Web Original Film, Best Actor in a Web Original Film (for both Gourav and Chaturvedi), and Best Actress in a Web Original Film (for Panday), and won 4 awards, including Best Actress (Critics) in a Web Original Film (for Panday) and Best Debut Director in a Web Original Film (for Singh).

== Plot ==
Imaad Ali, Ahana Singh, and Neil Pereira are three best friends who have been close since school. Imaad is a stand-up comedian, Ahana is an MBA graduate from London School of Economics working as a corporate consultant, and Neil is a personal gym trainer. All three are heavily dependent on social media.

Ahana is dissatisfied with her unfulfilling job when her boyfriend, Rohan, unexpectedly asks for a break. Hurt and confused, she stalks him online and discovers that he has a new girlfriend, Tanya. She begins posting on social media to regain his attention.

Imaad is a serial dater who uses Tinder under the alias "Zeeshan", has one-night stands and subsequently ghosts his dates. He meets Simran Kohli, an older photographer with whom he genuinely connects and begins to open up emotionally, but continues using Tinder despite Ahana and Neil urging him to pursue Simran seriously. Neil, from a humble middle-class background, dreams of opening his own gym. He compares himself with successful trainers on social media while seeking high-profile clients, and secretly dates popular influencer Laxmi Lalvani, known as "Lala".

During one of Imaad's comedy sets, he mocks Neil's relationship with Lala as fake. Neil takes offence, attacks him after the show, and tells him to confront his own problems with emotional intimacy. The friends stop speaking, worrying Ahana, who has quit her job to open a gym with them.

Imaad and Simran's relationship deepens, and they confess their feelings before moving in together. Meanwhile, Ahana's posts attract Rohan's attention. He flirts with her at a sangeet and they hook up, but he leaves before she wakes and blocks her number and social-media accounts.

Neil confronts Lala after seeing a post of her kissing another man. She admits that she was only with him out of boredom and never considered their relationship genuine. She later files a complaint against him, leading to his dismissal as a trainer. In anger, Neil hacks her Instagram account and posts material exposing her as a fake. He later publicly apologises after seeing her being harassed online.

Simran discovers messages from one of Imaad's Tinder dates and learns that he is still sleeping with other women. Although Imaad insists these encounters mean nothing, she ends their relationship and asks him to leave. Meanwhile, Ahana drunkenly confronts Rohan at his birthday party, revealing their affair to Tanya. After Rohan insults her outside, Imaad intervenes, and Neil arrives just as Rohan is about to hit him, punching Rohan. Imaad and Neil reconcile and leave with Ahana, who realises that Rohan should not determine her self-worth.

At a comedy show, Imaad tearfully reveals that he was sexually abused as a child by his father's business partner. He acknowledges that the trauma contributed to his difficulties with intimacy, but says he is now determined to take control of his life. His performance receives a standing ovation, and Ahana and Neil comfort him backstage.

The three friends begin taking their lives more seriously and become less dependent on social media. They eventually open the gym together, delighting their parents. Later, Imaad approaches Simran at the opening of her art gallery; her smile suggests that they will reconcile.

== Cast ==
- Siddhant Chaturvedi as Imaad Ali / Zeeshan
- Ananya Panday as Ahana Singh
- Adarsh Gourav as Neil Pereira
- Kalki Koechlin as Simran Kohli
- Anya Singh as Laxmi Lalvani / Lala
- Rohan Gurbaxani as Rohan Bhatia
- Rahul Vohra as Imaad's father
- Sahil Pathan as Vijay, Neil's friend
- Vijay Maurya as Malcolm Pereira, Neil's father
- Divya Jagdale as Sally Pereira, Neil's mother
- Garima Yagnik as Meher, Ahana's colleague and friend
- Kashyap Kapoor as Melbun, Imaad's manager
- Roshmin Mehandru as Malaika's primary trainer
- Mahathi Ramesh as Aisha
- Devarshi Shah as Ashish
- Shiven Tharyamal as Karthik Sethi
- Narendra Jetley as Paresh Phadnis, Lala's neighbor
- Kat Kristian as Tanya, Rohan's New girlfriend
- Malaika Arora as herself (cameo appearance)
- Farhan Akhtar as himself (cameo appearance)
- Sapan Verma as himself (cameo appearance)

== Production ==
=== Development ===
In June 2021, it was reported that Zoya Akthar had cast Siddhant Chaturvedi, Ananya Panday, and Adarsh Gourav in her next production. In September 2021, the filmmakers officially announced the film with the trio titled Kho Gaye Hum Kahan. In April 2023, Zoya Akthar announced the film had started shooting being directed by debutante Arjun Varain Singh and written by Singh, Akthar and Reema Kagti. The film would be produced by Excel Entertainment and Tiger Baby Films. The film marks the second collaboration between Panday and Chaturvedi after Shakun Batra's noir romantic drama Gehraiyaan (2022). The theme is billed as a coming-of-digital-age story of three friends based in Mumbai. In May 2023, Kalki Koechlin confirmed to be part of film.

=== Filming ===
The principal photography of the film began on 20 March 2022 and was wrapped up on 12 October 2022.

== Music ==
The music of the film is composed by OAFF–Savera, Sachin–Jigar, Ankur Tewari, Karan Kanchan, Rashmeet Kaur and Achint Thakkar, while the lyrics written by Javed Akhtar, Ankur Tewari, Dhrruv Yogi and Yashraj.

== Reception ==
On the review aggregator website Rotten Tomatoes, 81% of 16 critics' reviews are positive, with an average rating of 6.8/10.

Writing for Rediff, Sukanya Verma gave the film three and half stars and praised the film's examination of "what it's like to share a gehri dosti in the digital age even as the photos grow shallower by the day". Rohan Nahaar of The Indian Express had a similar take, reviewing "Kho Gaye Hum Kahan, a coming-of-age drama that will make everybody with a fast-depleting CultFit membership feel seen". In her review for Hindustan Times, Monika Rawal Kukreja also praised the film stating "Kho Gaye Hum Kahan packages as a coming-of-age tale in a simplistic yet impactful manner". A critic from Bollywood Hungama rated the film 3/5 stars and wrote "Kho Gaye Hum Kahan's strength lies in its performances, memorable moments and most importantly, depiction of the reality of today's social media era. The target audience, that is the urban youth, is sure to lap up the film".

Rahul Desai of Film Companion found that the film "reflects the mental frame-rate of the digital generation". Despite liking the film, Sneha Bengani of CNBC criticised how "all the conflicts are neatly packaged and airbrushed to perfection" adding that there is "little room for the chaos that is real life". In a negative review for The Hindu, Shilajit Mitra wrote that "debutant director Arjun Varain Singh and co-writers Zoya Akhtar and Reema Kagti present a half-baked critique of social media and influencer culture in this superficial drama about three best friends in Mumbai".

== Accolades ==
Award	Date of the ceremony	Category	Recipients	Result	Ref.
Filmfare OTT Awards	1 December 2024	Best Web Original Film	Kho Gaye Hum Kahan	Nominated	
Filmfare OTT Awards	1 December 2024	Best Actor in a Web Original Film	Adarsh Gourav	Nominated	
Filmfare OTT Awards	1 December 2024	Best Actor in a Web Original Film	Siddhant Chaturvedi	Nominated	
Filmfare OTT Awards	1 December 2024	Best Actress in a Web Original Film	Ananya Panday	Nominated	
Filmfare OTT Awards	1 December 2024	Best Actress (Critics) in a Web Original Film	Ananya Panday	Won	
Filmfare OTT Awards	1 December 2024	Best Debut Director in a Web Original Film	Arjun Varain Singh	Won	
Filmfare OTT Awards	1 December 2024	Special Recognition (Film)	Arjun Varain Singh	Won	
Filmfare OTT Awards	1 December 2024	Best Original Story (Web Original Film)	Zoya Akhtar, Arjun Varain Singh, and Reema Kagti	Won	
Filmfare OTT Awards	1 December 2024	Best Original Screenplay (Web Original Film)	Zoya Akhtar, Arjun Varain Singh, and Reema Kagti	Nominated	
Filmfare OTT Awards	1 December 2024	Best Original Dialogue (Web Original Film)	Yash Sahai	Nominated	
Filmfare OTT Awards	1 December 2024	Best Background Music (Web Original Film)	Sid Shirodkar	Nominated	
Filmfare OTT Awards	1 December 2024	Best Original Soundtrack (Web Original Film)	OAFF–Savera, Ankur Tewari, Sachin–Jigar, Achint Thakkar, Karan Kanchan and Rashmeet Kaur	Nominated	
Filmfare OTT Awards	1 December 2024	Best Production Design (Web Original Film)	Sally White	Nominated	
Filmfare OTT Awards	1 December 2024	Best Cinematographer (Web Original Film)	Tanay Satam	Nominated	
Filmfare OTT Awards	1 December 2024	Best Editing (Web Original Film)	Nitin Baid	Nominated	
Filmfare OTT Awards	1 December 2024	Best Sound Design (Web Original Film)	Pranav Shukla	Nominated	
