= Mast Mein Rehne Ka =

2023 Indian film

- Official release poster
- Directed by: Vijay Maurya
- Written by: Vijay Maurya; Payal Arora
- Produced by: Payal Arora; Vijay Maurya
- Starring: Jackie Shroff; Neena Gupta
- Cinematography: Nagaraj Rathinam
- Edited by: Antara Lahiri
- Music by: Score: Anurag Saikia; Songs: Anurag Saikia; Shailendra Barve; Kaam Bhaari
- Production companies: Amazon MGM Studios; Made in Maurya
- Distributed by: Amazon Prime Video
- Release date: 8 December 2023
- Running time: 127 minutes
- Country: India
- Language: Hindi

Mast Mein Rehne Ka (transl. Live carefree) is 2023 Indian Hindi-language comedy drama film written and directed by Vijay Maurya, and jointly produced by Maurya and his wife Payal Arora. Based on a story written jointly by Maurya and Arora, it stars Jackie Shroff and Neena Gupta in the lead role with Abhishek Chauhan, Monika Panwar, Faisal Malik and Rakhi Sawant.

It was released directly on Amazon Prime Video, on 8 December 2023.

== Plot ==
One day, a man tries to rob the house of an old widower for the very first time. The event triggers a chain of events wherein both of them meet some new people in Mumbai.

V.S. Kamath, a solitary widower trapped in a rigid routine, is jolted out of his comfort zone when his Mumbai apartment is burgled. Unnerved by the police's remarks on his isolation, he embarks on a quest for connection, striking up awkward conversations with strangers. His path crosses Prakash Handa, a vivacious Punjabi woman, and his curiosity compels him to follow her. This chance encounter lands them both in the police station, victims of another robbery, where their awkwardness blossoms into an unlikely friendship.

Kamath and Handa form a friendship by sharing experiences and facing struggles together. They start exploring houses together but their adventures change direction when they meet the thief who stole from Kamath and Handa. That incident links Kamath and Handas lives in ways they did not expect.

In a parallel track, we see the story of Madahosh "Nanhe" Gupta - a poor tailor who has come to Mumbai to make a living. Unable to make ends meet, he takes on big orders from Bimla "Bilkis", a dancer, without having the equipment to stitch the clothes. He takes a loan from a local loan shark to set up a small shop but does not earn enough to pay him back. Desperate for money, he burgles the houses of old people, including Kamath and Handa. He also falls in love with a beggar, Rani, who reciprocates his feelings.

== Cast ==
- Jackie Shroff as V.S. Kamath
- Neena Gupta as Parkash Kaur Handa, love interest of Shri v.s. kamath
- Abhishek Chauhan as Madahosh "Nanhe" Gopichand Gupta
- Monika Panwar as Rani alias Rawas
- Faisal Malik as Baburam
- Rakhi Sawant as Bimla "Bilkis" Jaiswal didi
- Priyadarshan Jadhav

== Reception ==
On the review aggregator website Rotten Tomatoes, 100% of 8 critics' reviews are positive, with an average rating of 6.5/10.

Alka Sahani of The Indian Express gave 2.5 stars out of 5 and said The film starring Jackie Shroff and Neena Gupta brings back trust in mankind. Optimism is the driving force behind this modern Mumbai story. Bhavna Agarwal of India Today writes in her review stating that the movie deftly examines the issue of old people regaining emotional ties. Mayur Sanap of Rediff.com stated that Mast Mein Rehne Ka is an incredibly relatable movie that will have you both laughing out loud and rooting for the characters. Nandini Ramnath of Scroll.in writes that the movie also has little time to stop for reason or coherence, racing instead to jump from one humorous or well-observed moment to the next. The creators discuss a variety of topics, such as Mumbai's propensity for verbal outbursts, the harshness of poverty, and loneliness—particularly among elderly citizens.
