= Vijay Maurya =

Indian actor, writer and director

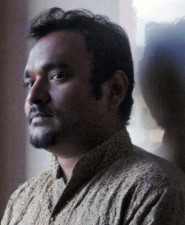
- Born: Mumbai, Maharashtra, India
- Occupations: Screenwriter; film director; actor

Vijay Maurya is an Indian actor, screenwriter and director who works in Indian films and theatre. He is best known for his work in the 2019 film Gully Boy.

== Career ==
=== Theatre ===
Maurya began his career in theatre by enrolling in a workshop under Satyadev Dubey for acting. He was an integral part of Prithvi Theatre from 1993 to 2008. He has worked in 14 original plays which have had a total of over 2500 shows. Some of his plays include Meena Kumari, Airawat, Solah Saal Ka Aakash, Jungle Ke Paar, Laila, Sa Hi Besura. The play Sa Hi Besura has been his most popular running successfully with over 100 shows.

=== Films ===
Maurya has acted in critically acclaimed films like Nishikant Kamat's Mumbai Meri Jaan and Anurag Kashyap's Black Friday. He is also a screenwriter and has won a National Film Award for Best Screenplay for the film Chillar Party along with Nitesh Tiwari and Vikas Bahl at the 59th National Film Awards. His latest film Gully Boy as a dialogue writer and supporting actor has been well received both critically and commercially.

Maurya made his digital debut as a director with the Amazon Original series Crash Course, created, produced and written by former UTV Motion Pictures associate Manish Hariprasad and co-written by Raina Roy.

=== Commercials ===
Having directed over a 150 commercials, Maurya is known for his witty sense of humour and has directed commercials for a number of Indian and International brands. He continues to work as an ad-film director along with his film commitments.

== Filmography ==
Year	Film	Actor	Director	Screenwriter	Role	Notes
1998	Satya	Yes	No	No	–	
1999	Mast	Yes	No	No	–	
2003	Paanch	Yes	No	No	Pondy	
2004	Black Friday	Yes	No	No	Dawood Ibrahim	
2005	Socha Na Tha	Yes	No	No	Shiva	
2008	Bombay to Bangkok	Yes	No	No	Jamal Khan	
2008	Mumbai Meri Jaan	Yes	No	No	Constable Sunil Kadam	
2009	Aage Se Right	Yes	No	No	Raghav Shetty	
2009	Ride the Wave Johnny	Yes	No	No	–	
2009	Peter Gaya Kaam Se	Yes	No	No	–	
2010	Bombay Mirror	Yes	No	No	–	Short film
2010	Striker	No	No	Yes	–	
2010	Khelein Hum Jee Jaan Sey	No	No	Dialogues	–	
2010	Tees Maar Khan	Yes	No	No	Soda	
2011	Chillar Party	No	No	Yes	–	
2013	Tendulkar Out	Yes	No	No	–	
2014	The Letters	Yes	No	No	Maharaj Singh	English film
2014	Bhoothnath Returns	Yes	No	No	Ghost	
2014	Nachom-ia Kumpasar	Yes	No	No	–	Konkani film
2015	Hunterrr	No	No	Dialogues	–	
2015	Vakratunda Mahakaaya	Yes	No	No	–	Marathi film
2015	Dhanak	Yes	No	No	–	
2016	Photocopy	No	Yes	Yes	–	
2017	Tumhari Sulu	Yes	No	Yes	Pankaj Rai Baaghi	
2019	Gully Boy	Yes	No	Dialogues	Ateeq Khan	
2019	Sacred Games	Yes	No	No	Ram Gopal Verma	Web Series
2020	Yeh Ballet	Yes	No	Dialogues	Nishu's father	
2021	Toofan	No	No	Additional Screenplay & Dialogues	–	
2021	The White Tiger	Yes	No	No	Mukesh	
2021	Radhe	No	No	Yes	–	
2022	A Thursday	No	No	Dialogues	–	
2022	Darlings	Yes	No	Dialogues	Inspector Rajaram Tawde	
2022	Shabaash Mithu	No	No	Dialogues	–	
2022	The Great Indian Murder	No	No	Yes	–	Web Series
2022	Crash Course	No	Yes	No	–	
2022	Rangbaaz: Darr Ki Rajneeti	Yes	No	No	Lakhan Rai	
2023	Mast Mein Rehne Ka	No	Yes	Yes	–	
2023	Kho Gaye Hum Kahan	Yes	No	No	Malcolm Pereira	
2024	Maidan	Yes	No	No	Indian Commentator	
2024	Agni	No	No	Yes	–	
2026	Waiting Hai	Yes	No	No	Mama	
2026	Lust Stories 3	Yes	No	No	Ravi Uncle	

== Awards ==
=== Filmfare Awards ===
Year	Category	For	Result	Ref.
2018	Best Dialogue	Tumhari Sulu	Nominated	
2020	Best Dialogue	Gully Boy	Won	

=== IIFA Awards ===
Year	Category	For	Result
2020	Best Dialogue	Gully Boy	Won

=== Star Screen Awards ===
Year	Category	For	Result
2020	Best Dialogue	Gully Boy	Won

=== SWA Awards ===
Year	Category	For	Result
2020	Best Dialogue	Gully Boy	Won

=== Indian Telly Streaming Awards ===
Year	Category	For	Result
2022	Best Screenplay - Hindi Series	The Great Indian Murder	Won
