= Haddi =

2023 film by Akshat Ajay Sharma

- Official release poster
- Directed by: Akshat Ajay Sharma
- Written by: Adamya Bhalla; Akshat Ajay Sharma
- Produced by: Zee Studios; Radhika Nanda; Sanjay Saha
- Starring: Nawazuddin Siddiqui; Anurag Kashyap; Ila Arun
- Cinematography: Piyush Puty; Jay Pinak Oza
- Edited by: Tanya Chhabria
- Music by: Rohan-Rohan
- Production company: Zee Studios
- Distributed by: ZEE5
- Release date: 7 September 2023
- Running time: 134 minutes
- Country: India
- Language: Hindi

Haddi is a 2023 Indian Hindi-language crime drama film directed by Akshat Ajay Sharma and produced by Zee Studios along with Anandita Studios. The film stars an Nawazuddin Siddiqui, Anurag Kashyap and Ila Arun in key roles. Nawazuddin Siddiqui plays a double role in the film, one of which is transgender.

The film released on 7 September 2023 via ZEE5 to mixed reviews from critics.

== Cast ==
- Nawazuddin Siddiqui as Haddi/Harika
- Anurag Kashyap as Pramod Ahlawat
- Mohammed Zeeshan Ayyub as Irfan
- Ila Arun as Revathy Amma
- Vipin Sharma as Bibek Mitra
- Saurabh Sachdeva as Inder
- Shridhar Dubey as Chunna
- Rajesh Kumar as Satto
- Saharsh Shukla as Jogi
- Vishwanth Chatterjee as Saathe
- Mahesh Chandra Bhatt as Constable
- Alam Khan as Sunil Ahlawat

== Production ==
The film was announced in August 2022 with a teaser poster of Nawazuddin Siddiqui as a transgender person. The shoots started soon after. It was shot across western Uttar Pradesh including Noida and Ghaziabad. Midway through the shoots, Nawaz shared a video of the three-hour daily process to get ready for the shoots.

== Reception ==
Zinia Bandyopadhyay of India Today rated the film 3 out of 5, praising the performance. Monika Rawal Kukreja of Hindustan Times too praised Nawaz's performance and commented, "The way he adapts the body language, dialect and overall persona of a transgender is on-point."

Rating it 2.5 out of 5, Saibal Chatterjee in his review for NDTV wrote, "Haddi is a revenge drama with a marked difference - it pushes issues relating to trans people to the fore with broad strokes and delivers an appeal for inclusivity."

Criticising the film, Shilajit Mitra of The Hindu commented, "It wears its noir griminess on its sleeve, and there are too many styles and tonalities jostling for attention at a given moment."

== Music ==
Haddi

Soundtrack album by Rohan-Rohan
- Released: 28 August 2023
- Recorded: 2022
- Genre: Feature film soundtrack
- Length: 39:33
- Language: Hindi
- Label: Zee Music Company

Official audio
- Haddi - Full Album on YouTube

The music of the film is composed by Rohan-Rohan while lyrics written by Rohan Gokhale.

Track listing
No.	Title	Singer(s)	Length
1.	"Kaun Hai Tu"	Devashri Manohar, Rohan Rohan	3:05
2.	"Beparda" (Alap written by Saad Khan)	Rekha Bhardwaj, Rohan Pradhan, Rohan-Rohan	5:31
3.	"Bas Aaj Ki Raat"	Wrisha Dutta, Rohan-Rohan	2:26
4.	"Alibaba"	Varun Likhate, Rohan Gokhale, Rohan-Rohan	2:10
5.	"Zaalim Ne Maar Dala"	Rohan Pradhan, Rohan-Rohan	3:24
6.	"Mastani Shama"	Prajakta Shukre, Rohan Pradhan, Rohan-Rohan	3:14
7.	"Shooter Saiyan"	Ankita Joshi, Rohan-Rohan	3:09
8.	"Beparda Reprise"	Rekha Bhardwaj, Rohan-Rohan	3:00
9.	"The Vengeance of Haddi"	-	2:21
10.	"The Soul of Haddi"	-	2:32
11.	"Gale Mein Atki Haddi"	-	5:24
12.	"Punarjanam And Sarvanash"	-	3:17
Total length:			39:33
