= Sharmajee Ki Beti =

2024 Hindi film

- Official release poster
- Directed by: Tahira Kashyap Khurrana
- Written by: Tahira Kashyap Khurrana
- Produced by: Atul Kasbekar; Sameer Nair; Deepak Segal
- Starring: Sakshi Tanwar; Divya Dutta; Saiyami Kher; Parvin Dabas; Sharib Hashmi
- Cinematography: Rakesh Haridas; Daljeet Singh
- Edited by: Antara Lahiri
- Music by: Donn Bhat
- Production companies: Applause Entertainment; Ellipsis Entertainment
- Distributed by: Amazon Prime
- Release date: 28 June 2024
- Running time: 115 minutes
- Country: India
- Language: Hindi

Sharmajee Ki Beti (transl. Sharmaji's Daughter) is a 2024 Hindi-language comedy, drama film written and directed by Tahira Kashyap Khurrana, in her directorial debut, under Applause Entertainment and Ellipsis Entertainment, for Amazon Prime Video. It stars Sakshi Tanwar, Divya Dutta, Saiyami Kher, Parvin Dabas, Sharib Hashmi in prime roles. It was released on 28 June 2024 on Amazon Prime.

== Cast ==
- Divya Dutta as Kiran Sharma
- Sakshi Tanwar as Jyoti Sharma
- Saiyami Kher as Tanvi Sharma
- Vanshika Taparia as Swati Sharma
- Arista Mehta as Gurveen Sharma
- Parvin Dabas as Vinod Sharma
- Sharib Hashmi as Sudhir Sharma
- Anjali Joshi as Dr. Narvekar
- Nazneen Madan as Dr. Shreya Talpade
- Ravjeet Singh as Rohan
- Sushant Ghadge as Chotu
- Tripti Sahu as Surina
- Guneet Wahan as Shamma

== Production ==
The film was announced by Tahira Kashyap Khurrana in August 2021. Principal photography began in the same month in Mumbai and Chandigarh. The filming wrapped up in November 2022.

== Release ==
Sharmajee Ki Beti was released on 28 June 2024 on Amazon Prime.

== Reception ==
On the review aggregator website Rotten Tomatoes, 73% of 11 critics' reviews are positive, with an average rating of 6.1/10.

Saibal Chatterjee of NDTV awarded 3 stars to the movie and wrote in his review "It is a lively, warm film marked by insight, intelligence and imagination and buoyed by a bunch of flawless performances." Shubhra Gupta of The Indian Express gave 2.5/5 stars and stated "It’s all very likeable even if predictable, because this is not the kind of film that’s going to leave any of its characters hanging or desolate". Sukanya Verma of Rediff.com wasn't positive about the movie and opined "Wanting to normalise menstruation and homosexuality is always appreciated but Sharmajee Ki Beti's airy-fairy approach doesn't quite convince."

Monika Rawal Kukreja of Hindustan Times stated "What truly steals the show in Sharmajee Ki Beti is Divya Dutta's heartwarming performance as a housewife on a journey of self-discovery." Arushi Jain of India Today too gave a negative review "Over its nearly two-hour runtime, it takes some effort to sit through." Snigdha Nalini of Outlook India stated "The movie is, at best, a one-time feel-good watch and that is a good attempt from a debutante director." Shreyas Pande of The New Indian Express gave only 1.5/5 stars and wrote "The film doesn’t believe in thoughtful reflection and merely underlines some pre-existing issues faced by women." Sonal Pandya of Times Now expressed "Keeping the focus on the teenage girls and their families would have been simpler." Riya Sharma of Daily News and Analysis felt "as if it is a four-hour-long film" and wrote in her review "The film tries to deal with too many things at once."

Suparna Sharma of The Week stated "It’s easy to make a big film about big things with big characters. But it’s always difficult to write with nuance about the daily occurrences.." Nandini Ramnath of Scroll.in praised Divya Dutta's performance and wrote "Although Kiran’s track is the most complicated as well as the most easily resolved, Dutta is an endearing superwoman." Pratikshya Mishra of The Quint gave some positive review with 3.5/5 stars "Tahira Kashyap Khurrana’s film leaves you wanting more – both of it and from it."
