= Tribhuvan Mishra CA Topper =

2024 Indian TV series

- Official release poster
- Genre: Thriller; Crime comedy; Dark comedy
- Created by: Puneet Krishna
- Written by: Puneet Krishna; Sumit Purohit; Arati Raval; Karan Vyas
- Directed by: Amrit Raj Gupta; Puneet Krishna
- Starring: Manav Kaul; Tillotama Shome; Shweta Basu Prasad
- Music by: Ram Sampath
- Composer: Anurag Saikia
- Country of origin: India
- Original language: Hindi
- No. of seasons: 1
- No. of episodes: 9

Production
- Executive producers: Ram Sampath; Vineet Krishna; Puneet Krishna
- Producer: Ram Sampath
- Cinematography: Anuj Samtani
- Editors: Amit Kulkarni; Divyajot Singh
- Running time: 44–67 minutes
- Production company: Rangeela Pictures

Original release
- Network: Netflix
- Release: 18 July 2024

Tribhuvan Mishra CA Topper is a 2024 Hindi-language television series written and created by Puneet Krishna and produced by Ram Sampath for Netflix. It stars Manav Kaul, Tillotama Shome, Shweta Basu Prasad, Ashok Pathak, Faisal Malik, Subhrajyoti Barat, Sumit Gulati, Naina Sareen, Shrikant Verma, Jitin Gulati, and Yamini Das.

== Plot summary ==
The series follows Tribhuvan Mishra, portrayed by Manav Kaul, who topped the Chartered Accountant (CA) examination, and works as a CA in a government office in Noida, India. His side hustle as a sex worker servicing women clients under the pseudonym "CA topper" entangles him in a web of crime and moral dilemmas. As he navigates through the dark underbelly of Noida's crime world, the show delves into themes of desperation, moral compromise, and the struggles of middle-class life.

== Cast ==
- Manav Kaul as Tribhuvan Mishra
- Tillotama Shome as Bindi Jain
- Shubhrajyoti Barat as Teeka Ram Jain
- Naina Sareen as Ashoklata Mishra
- Shweta Basu Prasad as Shobha Pathak
- Ashok Pathak as Dhaincha
- Amarjeet Singh as Lappu
- Ankur Pathak as Pinky
- Divyani Gandhi as Lalitha Kumari
- Husne Shabnam as Reeta
- Subodh Gulati as RTO Officer
- Jitin Gulati as Vineet/Desi Ghoda
- Faisal Malik as Haider Ali
- Sunil Saraswat as Mathew Varghese
- Yamini Das as Mando Bua
- Sumit Gulati as Subodh Pathak
- Anil Saini as Kidnapped chacha

== Release ==
The series was premiered on 18 July 2024 on Netflix.

== Reception ==
Shubhra Gupta of The Indian Express gave 2.5/5 stars and observed "In the places it does well, it does really well, but then again, it comes right back to that problem of those poor put-upon mothers and sisters." Rashmi Vasudeva of Deccan Herald gave 3/5 stars and wrote "The screenplay sags now and then, and by the sixth episode, the jokes fall flat." Sakshi Verma of India TV expressed "The series talks about human emotions in every way possible." Sonal Pandya of Times Now observed "The lengthy series can't reach a cohesive ending." Titas Chowdhury of News18 rated 3.5/5 stars and stated "Don't be mistaken. Tribhuvan Mishra: CA Topper doesn't try to glorify paid sex or extramarital affairs."

Troy Ribeiro of The Free Press Journal stated "The series delves into themes of desperation and moral compromise with unflinching honesty." Nandini Ramnath of Scroll.in commented "The conceit is sold through a hyper-real aesthetic." Suparna Sharma of The Week opined "The show is carried valiantly by its actors and their performances." Lachmi Deb Roy of Firstpost commented "If you are viewing the show from the gender arc, the story tells us that as a woman we must celebrate our flaws, vulnerabilities and desires."
