= Jaane Jaan =

Jaan-E-Jaan
- Directed by: Ramesh Behl
- Produced by: Mandhir Sial for Manoranjan Movies
- Starring: Randhir Kapoor; Neetu Singh; Ajit; Bindu; Ranjeet
- Music by: R. D. Burman
- Release date: 3 June 1983
- Country: India
- Language: Hindi

Jaan-E-Jaan (also known as Nikamma) is a 1983 Indian Hindi-language film directed by Ramesh Behl and produced by Mandhir Sial, starring Randhir Kapoor and Neetu Singh. The film was started way back in 1976 but production got delayed and film was released in 1983.

== Story ==
Neetu plays a rich little suicidal girl as she believe she is suffering from cancer and has only few months to live, hires an unemployed person, Randhir to kill her.

== Cast ==
- Randhir Kapoor as Raju
- Neetu Singh as Meena
- Ranjeet as Tony
- Bindu as Rosy
- Ajit as Kundan

== Soundtrack ==
No.	Title	Singer(s)	Length
1.	"Jaan-E-Jaan Duniya Se"	Kishore Kumar
2.	"Koi Shama Sheeshe Ki Laya"	Kishore Kumar
3.	"Tere Bina Main Kuch Bhi Nahin Hoon, Mere Bina Tu Kuch Bhi Nahin"	Kishore Kumar, Asha Bhosle
4.	"Gao Siyo Senorita Jhumke Geet Pyar Ke"	Kishore Kumar, Asha Bhosle, Mohammed Rafi
5.	"Tere Bina Ab Ek Pal"	Asha Bhosle
