= Siddhant Chaturvedi =

Indian actor (born 1993)

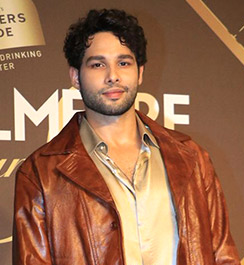
- Chaturvedi in 2025
- Born: 29 April 1993 (age 33); Ballia, Uttar Pradesh, India
- Education: Mithibai College
- Occupation: Actor
- Years active: 2016–present

Siddhant Chaturvedi (born 29 April 1993) is an Indian actor who appears in Hindi films. He starred as a teenage cricketer in the Amazon Prime Video series Inside Edge (2017–19), and ventured into films with the supporting role of a street rapper in the musical drama Gully Boy (2019), which won him the Filmfare Award for Best Supporting Actor. In the following decade, Chaturvedi transitioned into lead roles. During a period of commercial setbacks, he found success through streaming ventures such as the romantic drama Gehraiyaan (2022) and the coming-of-age drama Kho Gaye Hum Kahan (2023).

== Early life ==
Chaturvedi was born on 29 April 1993 in Ballia, Uttar Pradesh and moved to Mumbai when he was five years old. His father is a chartered accountant and his mother is a homemaker. He attended Mithibai College in Mumbai and initially aspired to be a chartered accountant (CA), while acting on-stage for his passion. While pursuing his CA articleship, some time off, during which he participated in and won The Times of India's Fresh Face Contest in 2013.

== Career ==
=== Early work and breakthrough (2016–2019) ===
In 2016, Chaturvedi appeared in the web television sitcom Life Sahi Hai, about four male roommates. The following year, he began starring as Prashant Kanaujia, a teenage cricketer, in the Amazon Prime Video series Inside Edge, which was inspired by the Indian Premier League. Reviewing the first season for Scroll.in, Devarsi Ghosh considered Chaturvedi and his co-star Tanuj Virwani to be the show's "two big acting discoveries". He later reprised his role for the second season in 2019.

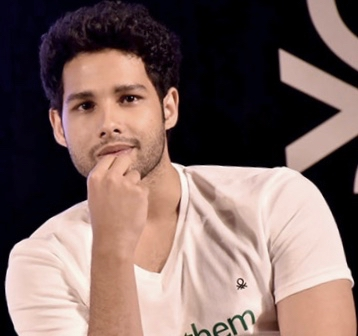
Chaturvedi in 2019

He auditioned for a small role in Brahmāstra: Part One – Shiva (2022) and got selected. However, following advice from his father, Chaturvedi refused to do the film. He was offered a three film contract by the film's producer Karan Johar of Dharma Productions, which he also refused, after which, he claimed that he was briefly blacklisted from the industry for refusing to do minor roles. At a success party of Inside Edge, filmmaker Zoya Akhtar, whose brother Farhan Akhtar produced the show, spotted and asked Chaturvedi to audition for her next directorial Gully Boy (2019), which marked his film debut and proved to be his breakthrough role. Starring Ranveer Singh and Alia Bhatt, the film saw Chaturvedi play the supporting role of a street rapper named MC Sher, who fuels the ambitions of Ranveer Singh's titular character. Jay Weissberg of Variety found Chaturvedi to be "impressive" in his part, and Rajeev Masand and Rishabh Goel commended his "charming presence". At the annual Filmfare Awards ceremony, he was awarded with the Filmfare Award for Best Supporting Actor in addition to a nomination for Best Male Debut.

=== Career fluctuations (2020–present) ===
Chaturvedi next appeared in Yash Raj Films's Bunty Aur Babli 2 (2021), co-starring Rani Mukerji, Saif Ali Khan and Sharvari Wagh, a sequel to the crime comedy Bunty Aur Babli (2005). It emerged as a critical and commercial failure. He had a lead role in Shakun Batra's Gehraiyaan (2022), a drama about infidelity, co-starring Deepika Padukone and Ananya Panday. It was released on Amazon Prime Video. Sukanya Verma of Rediff.com found his portrayal of a "tricky part" to be "compelling". The film recorded high viewership to emerge as a streaming success. He then featured in the comedy horror film Phone Bhoot with Katrina Kaif and Ishaan Khatter. Reviewers were generally unimpressed with the picture, but Saibal Chatterjee of NDTV opined that Chaturvedi had played his "brash and quick-on-the-draw" character well.

Chaturvedi then appeared alongside Panday and Adarsh Gourav in Netflix's coming-of-age drama Kho Gaye Hum Kahan (2023). In her review for Hindustan Times, Monika Rawal Kukreja described Chatruvedi as "effortless and natural" with a "strong screen presence". The drama launched successfully on the platform with 6.3 million hours watched in the first week. In the following year, he had a starring role in the action film Yudhra from director Ravi Udyawar. Shubhra Gupta of The Indian Express considered it a downgrade after his work on Kho Gaye Hum Kahan, and the film emerged as a box-office bomb. This was followed by the spiritual sequel Dhadak 2, a remake of the Tamil film Pariyerum Perumal. Starring him alongside Triptii Dimri, the film follows an inter-caste couple who fall in love in college despite their families' objections. In a mixed review of the film, Hindustan Times' Rishabh Suri commended his performance of a "young man trapped in systemic injustice but still searching for a way out", particularly in the film's second half. Additionally, Rahul Desai of The Hollywood Reporter India noted that Chatruvedi had finally "refurbished the potential" he first displayed in Gully Boy after a series of unremarkable films. Despite its positive critical reception, Dhadak 2 failed at the box-office. The following year, Chaturvedi reunited with Udyawar for the Sanjay Leela Bhansali-produced romance Do Deewane Seher Mein (2026) opposite Mrunal Thakur, which also failed at the box-office, though his performance was positively received.

He will next feature alongside Jaya Bachchan and Wamiqa Gabbi in Vikas Bahl's comedy film Dil Ka Darwaaza Khol Na Darling.

== In the media ==
Chaturvedi was ranked in The Times of India's listing of the most desirable man at number 19 in 2019 and at number 15 in 2020. In 2022, he was ranked 24th in GQ India's "30 Most Influential Young Indians" list. In 2023, Forbes Asia featured him in its 30 Under 30 list.

Chaturvedi gained media attention following a 2020 industry roundtable discussion regarding the challenges faced by outsider actors versus those from film families. In response to Ananya Panday's comparison of her career struggles to her father's absence from the talk show Koffee with Karan, Chaturvedi remarked:

"The difference is jahaan humare sapne poore hote hain, wahi inka struggle shuru hota hai (The difference is that where our dreams come true, their struggle begins)."

The exchange resulted in public criticism of Panday and established Chaturvedi's reputation as an outspoken advocate for outsiders. Although some critics characterised the remark as arrogant, Chaturvedi later clarified that it reflected the confidence necessary to succeed in the film industry. Chaturvedi has maintained that his primary focus is acting, expressing little interest in cultivating a star image or becoming a fashion icon.

== Filmography ==
=== Films ===
Key
†	Denotes films that have not yet been released

Year	Title	Role	Notes	Ref.
2019	Gully Boy	Shrikant Bhosle aka MC Sher		
2021	Bunty Aur Babli 2	Kunal Singh alias Bunty		
2022	Gehraiyaan	Zain Oberoi		
2022	Phone Bhoot	Sherdil "Major" Shergill		
2023	Kho Gaye Hum Kahan	Imaad Ali		
2024	Yudhra	Yudhra Dixit		
2025	Dhadak 2	Neelesh Ahirwar		
2026	Do Deewane Seher Mein	Shashank Sharma		
2026	Dil Ka Darwaaza Khol Na Darling †	Shubham Aggarwal	Filming	

=== Television ===
Year	Title	Role
2016–2018	Life Sahi Hai	Sahil Hooda
2017–2019	Inside Edge	Prashant Kanaujia
2024	India's Got Latent	Himself
2025	The Ba***ds of Bollywood	Himself

=== Music video appearances ===
Year	Title	Singer(s)	Lyrics	Music	Ref.
2024	"Ittefaq"	Himself, Savera	Himself	OAFF, Savera	

== Awards and nominations ==
Year	Award	Category	Work	Result	Ref.
2019	Screen Awards	Best Male Debut	Gully Boy	Won	
2020	Filmfare Awards	Best Male Debut	Gully Boy	Nominated	
2020	Filmfare Awards	Best Supporting Actor	Gully Boy	Won	
2020	Zee Cine Awards	Best Male Debut	Gully Boy	Won	
2023	Bollywood Hungama Style Icons	Most Stylish Trailblazer	—N/a	Nominated	
2023	Bollywood Hungama Style Icons	Most Stylish Emerging Icon	—N/a	Nominated	
2024	Filmfare OTT Awards	Best Actor in a Web Original Film (Male)	Kho Gaye Hum Kahan	Nominated	
