= Despatch (film) =

2024 Indian film by Kanu Behl

- Official release poster
- Directed by: Kanu Behl
- Written by: Kanu Behl; Ishani Banerjee
- Produced by: Ronnie Screwvala
- Starring: Manoj Bajpayee; Shahana Goswami
- Cinematography: Siddharth Diwan
- Edited by: Samarth Dixit
- Production company: RSVP Movies
- Distributed by: ZEE5
- Release dates: 21 November 2024 (IFFI); 13 December 2024
- Running time: 151 minutes
- Country: India
- Language: Hindi

Despatch is an Indian Hindi-language crime drama film directed by Kanu Behl. The film is produced by Ronnie Screwvala under RSVP Movies and it stars Manoj Bajpayee and Shahana Goswami in lead roles. Despatch was released on 13 December 2024 on ZEE5, and received mixed-to-negative reviews from critics. It was showcased as a special presentation at the International Film Festival of India and the MAMI Mumbai Film Festival.

== Plot ==
As news shifts to the digital realm, seasoned crime journalist Joy finds himself teetering on the edge of obsolescence. Resolute in his pursuit to uncover the next major story while navigating the complexities of his personal life, Joy embarks on an unyielding journey through the depths of Mumbai, revealing its most shadowy secrets. While doing his journalism, he gets to know about a big secret putting his life in danger.

== Cast ==
- Manoj Bajpayee as Joy Bag
- Shahana Goswami as Shweta Bag
- Arrchita Agarwaal as Prerna Prakash
- Anand Alkunte as S.I Bhonsle
- Riju Bajaj as Tarun Khaitan
- Purnendu Bhattacharya as Mallick
- Prithvik Pratap as Jeethu Vishwas
- Veena Mehta as Joy's Mother
- Ajay Purkar as Prasad
- Purnima Rathod as Mrs. Verma
- Parvati Sehgal as Varsha Rajput
- Rituparna Sen as Noori Rai (as Rii Sen)
- Mamik Singh as Silva
- Kabir Sadanand as Wadhwa

== Production ==
=== Development ===
The project began in 2016 after extensive research into crime journalism in particular and the Mumbai underworld. The film was directed by Kanu Behl, known for his critically acclaimed works such as Titli and Agra. Behl also co-wrote the screenplay with Ishani Banerjee. Manoj Bajpayee was cast as a crime journalist.

=== Release ===
The film was screened at the MAMI Mumbai Film Festival and later at the International Film Festival of India in Goa, where it received praise for its storytelling and performances. The official teaser of the film was released in November 2022 and the trailer came out on 3 December 2024.

== Reception ==
The film received mixed-to-negative reviews form critics.

Dhaval Roy of Times of India rated it 3 out of 5 stars and wrote "Despatch is effective in its depiction of crime journalism and explores the value of information that can save or end lives. Despite its pace and sombre vein, it’s a worthy one-time watch."

Subhash K Jha of Times Now rated 3.5 out of 5 stars and wrote "Despatch is a film that commands our uninterrupted attention and eventually, our respect for being what it is."
