= Brahman Naman =

2016 film by Qaushiq Mukherjee

- Theatrical release poster
- Directed by: Qaushiq Mukherjee
- Written by: Naman Ramachandran
- Produced by: Steve Barron; Celine Loop
- Cinematography: Qaushiq Mukherjee; Siddhartha Nuni
- Edited by: Manas Mittal
- Music by: Miti Adhikari; Neel Adhikari
- Production companies: Riley; Corniche Pictures; Oddjoint
- Distributed by: Netflix
- Release date: 24 January 2016 (Sundance)
- Running time: 95 minutes
- Country: India
- Language: English

Brahman Naman is a 2016 English-language Indian sex comedy film directed by Qaushiq Mukherjee. It was shown in the World Cinema Dramatic Competition section at the 2016 Sundance Film Festival. It was released on Netflix worldwide on 7 July 2016.

== Cast ==
- Shashank Arora as Naman
- Tanmay Dhanania as Ajay
- Chaitanya Varad
- Sid Mallya as Ronnie
- Denzil Smith as Bernie
- Biswa Kalyan Rath as Illash
- Vaishwath Shankar as Randy
- Shataf Figar as Brian D' Costa
- Sindhu Sreenivasa Murthy as Ash
- Anula Navlekar as Miss Naina

== Plot ==
A group of young sex-starved college kids search for women who are willing to take their virginity in 1980s Bangalore in southern India.
