= Navnindra Behl =

Indian actor and director (1949–2026)

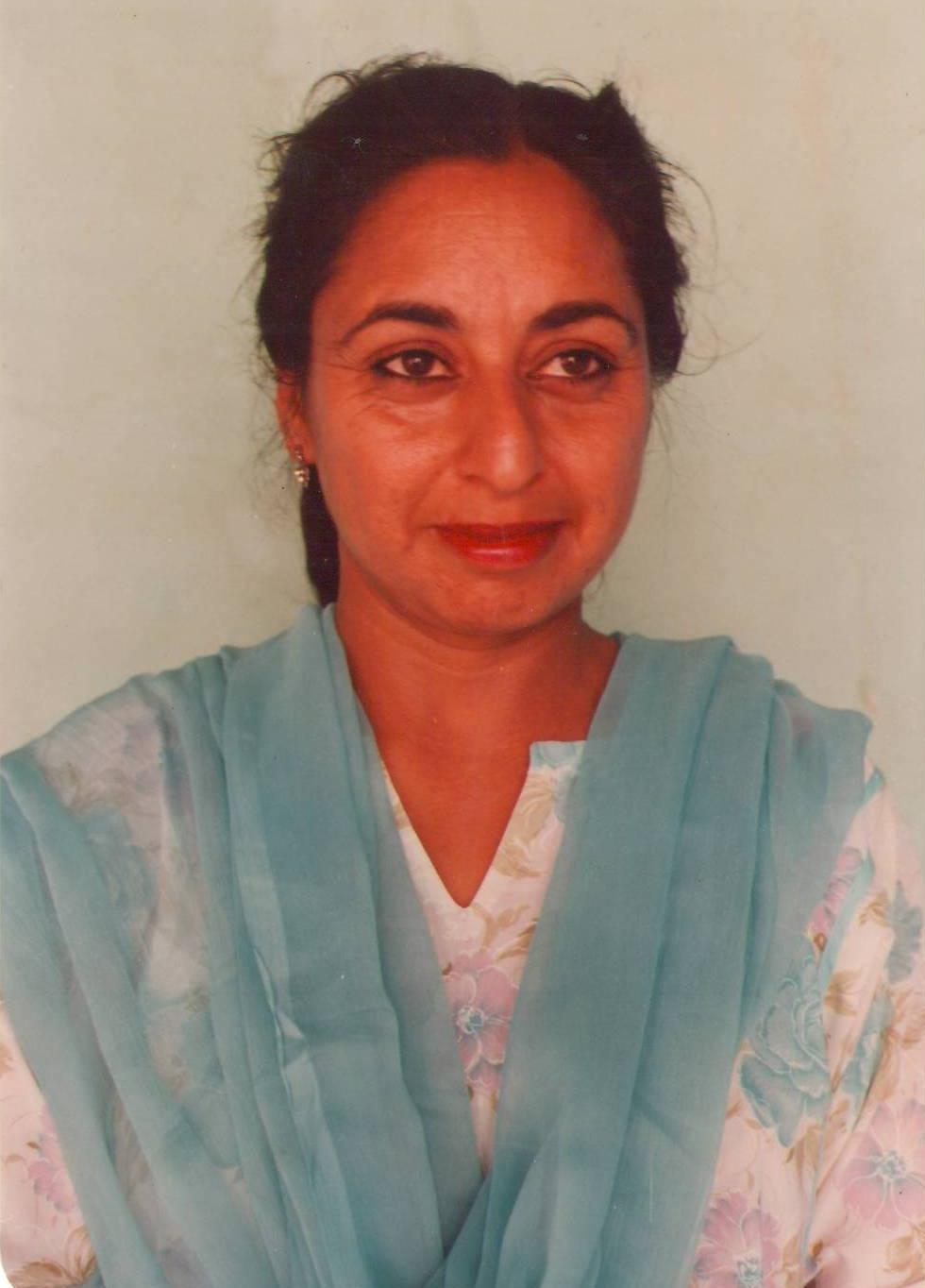
- Born: 30 October 1949; Delhi, India
- Died: 16 March 2026 (aged 76)
- Occupations: Director, writer, actor
- Spouse: Lalit Behl
- Children: Kanu Behl

Navnindra Behl as a poor woman in a subplot of TV Serial Afsane

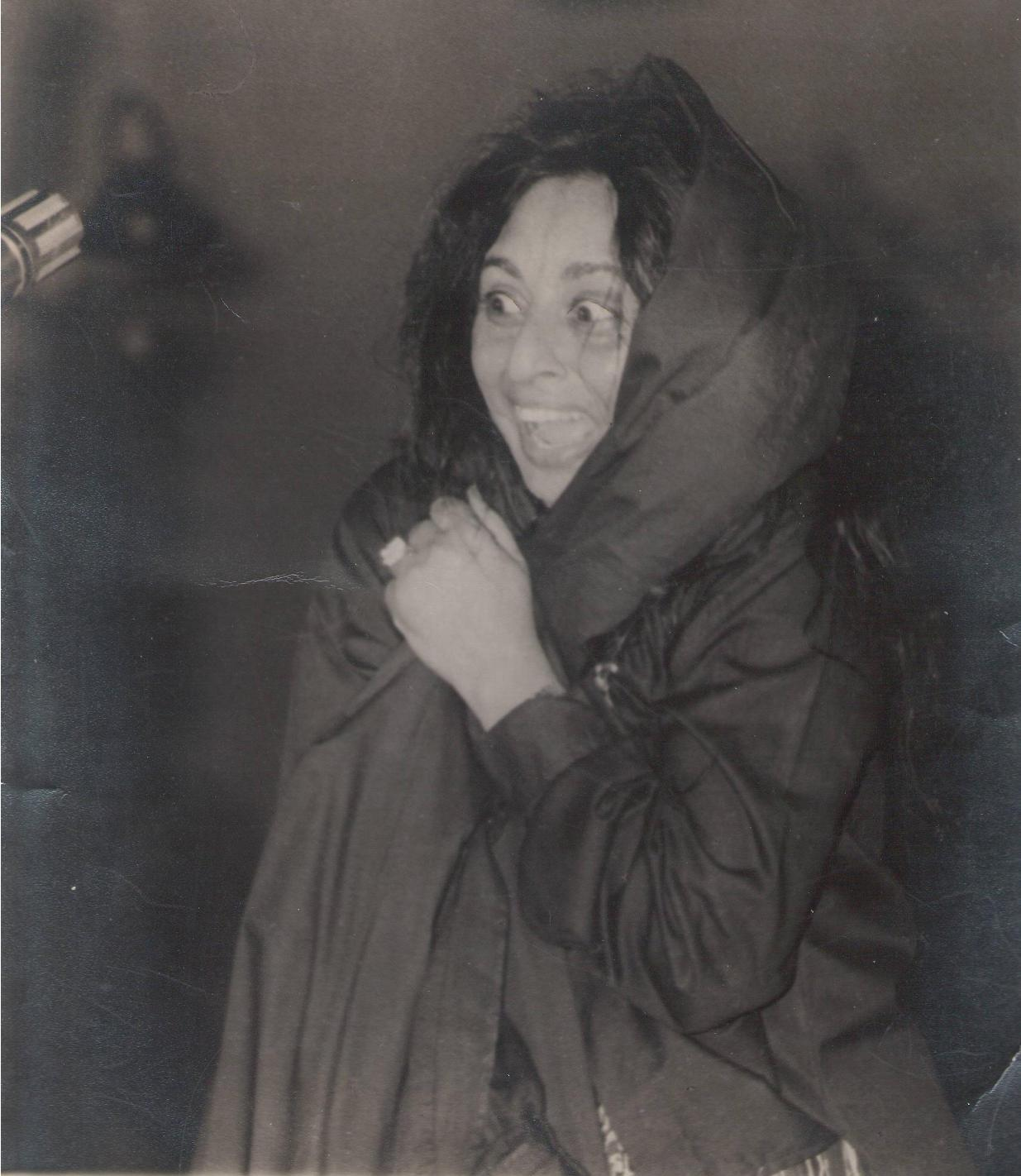
Navnindra Behl in play Agg De Kalire

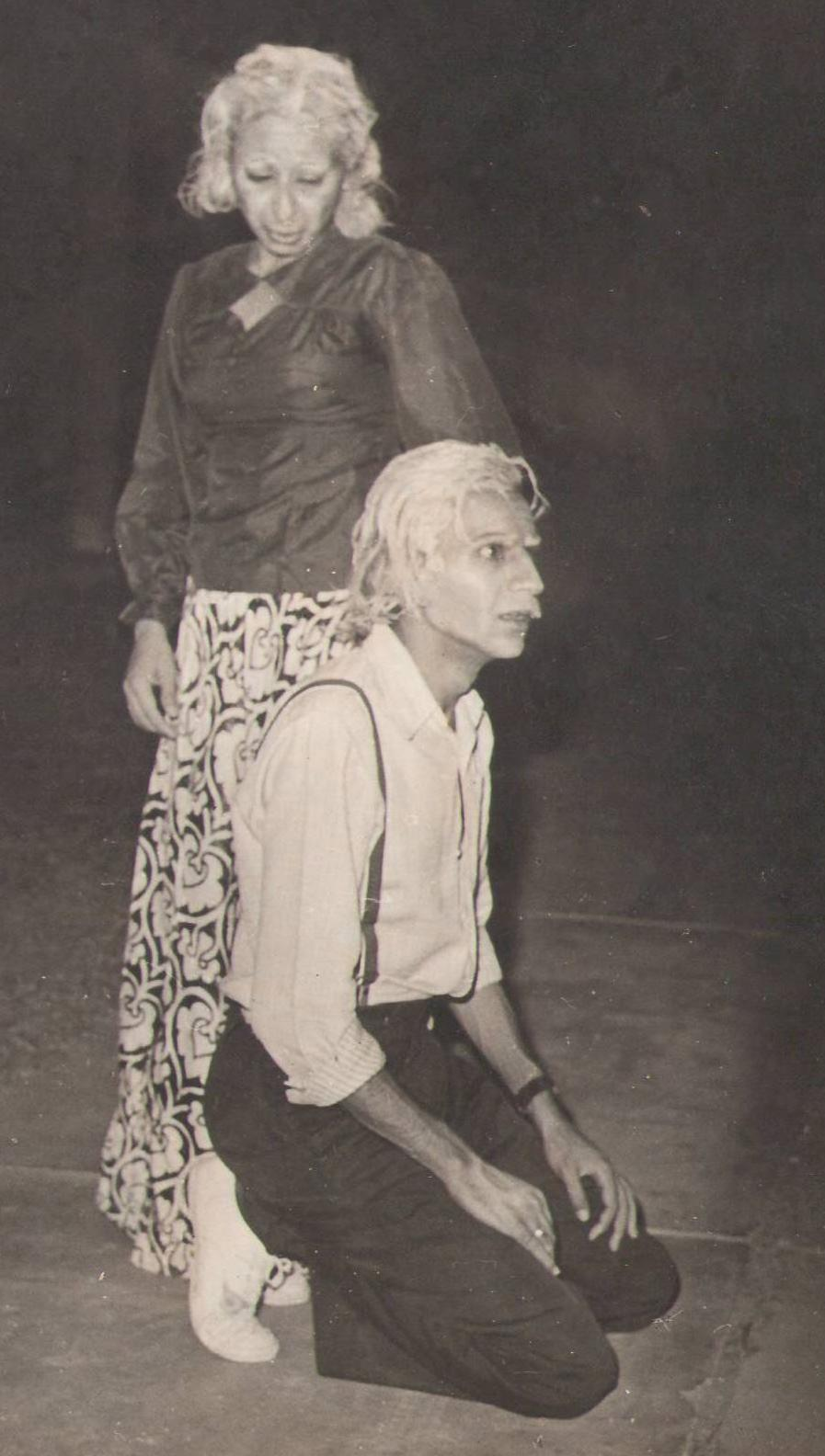
Navnindra Behl with Ravi Deep in play The Chairs

Navnindra Behl (30 October 1949 – 16 March 2026) was an Indian director, writer and actor. She was known for directing theatre and television shows.

== Early life ==
Behl was born in Delhi, India on 30 October 1949, into a Jatt Sikh family. She started stage acting when she was just three years old. Besides participation in plays at school and college, she got involved in amateur theatre at Patiala, a former princely state in India, and did her post-graduatate studies in Punjabi literature.

== Career ==
Shortly after her graduation, Navnindra Behl joined the Drama Department of Punjabi University, Patiala as a lecturer. Besides writing and directing a number of stage plays, Navnindra bore the credit for training and grooming many stage, television and film artists during her career of 37 years as lecturer, reader, professor and head of department. She was Director, Audio-Visual Research Centre, funded by CEC (University Grants Commission, Delhi) for 3 years and had 25 years' experience of teaching production, direction and acting for television at Patiala University and as visiting faculty in various institutes. She acted in numerous stage plays.

Behl had 30 years experience as writer, actress and director in the television industry. She directed films and serials for television, wrote scripts for television programmes for Doordarshan, documentaries for the Central and Punjab Government Departments, documentaries and educational programmes for the Audio-Visual Research Centre, CEC, Delhi and the Films Division.

She had 15 years' experience as writer and actress in the film industry and acted with filmmakers of high repute such as Gulzar (Maachis, 1996), Dibakar Banerjee (Oye Lucky! Lucky Oye!), Vishal Bhardwaj (Gubaare) and Hollywood projects like The Pride and The Guru.

Behl was a member on the selection panels of UPSC (for theatre and media), Rabindra Bharti University, and had been on the list of the board of experts and advisers of the Indian Theatre Department, Punjab University, Chandigarh, Doordarshan Kendra, Jullundur and the Department of Cultural Affairs Ministry, Delhi Government. In addition to being Member Syndicate and Member Academic Council, Punjabi University, Patiala, she was on the panel as eminent visiting faculty of Punjab University, Jaipur University, Garhwal University, GNDU University, Amritsar, Film & Television Institute Kolkata, Mumbai University, etc. Author of ten books, as creative writer, research related subjects on theatre and media studies, she made significant contribution as resource person and keynote speaker at many conferences, seminars and workshops on cinema, television and theatre.

== Personal life and death ==
Behl was the eldest daughter of dramatist and theatre personality Kapoor Singh Ghuman. Her husband Lalit Behl was a theatre and television director-actor. Her son Kanu Behl is a film writer and director.

Behl died on 16 March 2026, at the age of 76.

== Filmography ==
=== As producer ===
- Vijji Amma, a documentary of the life of social activist Vijji Srinivasan for Films Division, Mumbai.
- Rangmanch Ke Teen Rang, a documentary on Folk Theatre Forms of North India produced by North Zone Cultural Centre, Patiala.
- Dhund, Hanera te Jugnu, a documentary on elections in Punjab for Punjab Govt.
- Many documentaries and lecture series for Educational Multi Media Research Centre, Govt. of India.
- Khanabadosh, a 13-part serial for Department of Adul Education, Govt. of India, New Delhi.
- Woh Ladki Serial for Doordarshan
- Roop Basant Serial for Doordarshan
- Peele Patton Ki Dastan tele serial for Doordarshan
- Rani Kokilan tele film for Doordarshan
- Chirion Ka Chamba tele film for Doordarshan

=== As director ===
- Vijji Amma, documentary
- Rangmanch Ke Teen Rang, documentary on Folk Theatre Forms of North India produced by North Zone Cultural Centre, Patiala.
- Dhund, Hanera te Jugnu, documentary
- Many documentaries and lecture series for Educational Multi Media Research Centre, Govt. of India.
- Khanabadosh, a 13-part serial
- Bruhon Paar Na Jayin, Stage Play
- Sadda Jaggon Seer Mukkeya, Stage Play
- Naun Baran Dus, Stage Play
- Kashmir Diary, Stage Play
- Razayi, Stage Play
- Bandmaster, Stage Play
- Bhabi Maina, Stage Play
- Kumaraswami, Stage Play
- Peele Pattean Di Dastan, TV Serial
- Wo Ladki, Telefilm
- Roop Basant' Serial for Doordarshan
- Rani Kokilan, Telefilm
- Chirion Ka Chamba, Telefilm
- Saanp, Stage Play
- Bagula Bhagat, Stage Play
- Daldal, Stage Play
- Baaki Itihas, Stage Play

=== As a writer ===
- Peele Pattean Di Dastan, TV Adaptation of Novel by Dalip Kaur Tiwana
- Bruhon Paar Na Jayin, (Adaptation of The House of Bernarda Alba)
- Sadda Jaggon Seer Mukkeya, Stage Play (Adaptation of Baldev Dhaliwal's story)
- Naun Baran Dus, Stage Play (Adaptation of Varyam Sandhu's story)
- Kashmir Diary, Stage play
- Razayi Stage Play (Adaptation of Veena Varma's story)
- Bandmaster, Stage Play (Translation of Hungarian play Totek)
- Bhabi Maina, Stage Play (Adaptation of Gurbaksh Singh Preetladi's story)
- Kumarswamy, Hindi Stage Play, 1981
- Aakhiri Natak, Stage Play
- Nayak Katha, Hindi Stage Play, 1976

=== As an actress ===
- Almost Pyaar with DJ Mohabbat, Hindi Feature Film
- Khufiya, Hindi Film
- Dil Boley Oberoi, Hindi TV Serial
- Ishqbaaaz, Hindi TV Serial
- Peterson Hill, Hindi TV Serial
- Mukti Bhawan, Hindi Feature Film
- Queen, Hindi Feature Film
- Viji Amma, Documentary
- Sadaa-E-Vaadi, Hindi TV Serial
- Oye Lucky Lucky Oye, Hindi Feature Film
- Gubaare, Tele Film
- The Pride
- The Guru.
- Peele Patteyan Di Dastaan, Punjabi TV Serial
- Viji, Hindi TV Serial
- Khanabadosh, Urdu TV Serial
- Sunehri Jild, Punjabi Telefilm
- Pankhudian, Punjabi TV Serial
- Roop Basant, Punjabi TV Serial
- Mahasangram, Hindi TV Serial
- Ved Vyas Ke Pote, Hindi TV Serial
- Maachis, Feature Film
- Afsane, Hindi TV Serial
- Aatish, Hindi Telefilm
- Rani Kokilan, Punjabi Telefilm
- Wo Ladki, Hindi Telefilm
- Chirion Ka Chamba, Hindi Telefilm
- Tapish, Hindi Telefilm
- Happy Birth Day, Hindi Telefilm
- Ruliya, Punjabi Teleplay
- Blood Wedding, Stage Play
- Thes, Hindi Telefilm, 1985
- Buniyad, Punjabi Serial
- Ruliya, Punjabi Telefilm, 1985
- Suryast, Hindi Stage Play, 1981
- The Chairs, Hindi Stage Play, 1977
- Pagla Ghoda, Stage Play
- Suryast, Hindi Stage Play, 1977
- Surya Ki Antim Kiran Se Surya Ki Pehli Kiran Tak, Hindi Stage Play, 1976
- Daldal, Stage Play

== Published works ==
- Aawan, Punjabi Translation of Chitra Mudgal's Hindi novel
- Miss Julie, Stage Play (Translation of Strindberg's play)
- Mahamarg, Stage Play (Translation of Strindberg's The Great Highway)
- Takdi Dhir, (Translation of Strindberg's The Stronger)
- Abhinay Kala, Book on Art of Acting
- Nataki Sahit, Book on Dramatic Literature
- Bharti Theatre, Book on Indian Literature
- Rangmanch Ate Television Natak , Book on Theatre & Television*

== Awards ==
- Awarded as producer and director at first Indo-Soviet Russian Film Festival in 1989–90 for the video film "Chirion Ka Chamba" produced for Delhi Doordarshan.
- Awarded as best writer by Sahitya Kala Parishad, Delhi Administration in 1984 for the script "Kumarswamy".
- “Akashwani Award" for best writer by M/o Information & Broadcasting, Govt. of India.
- “Rashtriya Ratan Award" for contribution to film and television industry by International Friendship Forum, New Delhi.
- Honoured for contribution to cinema by Human Rights Organisation for the film Maachis directed by Gulzar.
- Awarded and honoured by Manch – Rangmanch, Amritsar for achievements in the field of theatre and media.
