= Hotel Salvation =

- Mukti Bhawan
- Directed by: Shubhashish Bhutiani
- Screenplay by: Shubhashish Bhutiani; Asad Hussain
- Produced by: Sanjay Bhutiani; Sajida Sharma; Shubhashish Bhutiani
- Starring: Adil Hussain; Lalit Behl; Geetanjali Kulkarni; Palomi Ghosh; Navnindra Behl; Anil K Rastogi
- Cinematography: Michael McSweeney; David Huwiler
- Edited by: Manas Mittal
- Music by: Tajdar Junaid
- Production company: Red Carpet Moving Pictures
- Release dates: September 2, 2016 (Venice Film Festival); April 7, 2017 (India)
- Running time: 102 minutes
- Country: India
- Language: Hindi

Hotel Salvation (known in India as Mukti Bhawan) is a 2016 Indian film written and directed by Shubhashish Bhutiani and produced by Sanjay Bhutiani. The film is a comedy-drama about a son who is forced to set his job aside to accompany his elderly father to the holy city of Varanasi. It stars Adil Hussain and Lalit Behl in the lead roles. The film received four nominations at the 63rd Filmfare Awards, including Best Film (Critics).

== Plot ==
Mukti Bhawan follows the story of a reluctant son who must take his father to the holy city of Varanasi, where his father believes he will breathe his last and attain salvation. When a 77-year-old man, Daya, wakes up from a strange nightmare, he knows his time is up and he must get to Varanasi immediately in the hope of dying there to attain salvation. His dutiful son, Rajiv, is left with no choice but to drop everything and make the journey with his stubborn father, leaving behind his wife and daughter. The two of them check into Mukti Bhawan, a hotel devoted to people hoping to spend their last days there. Rajiv finds himself having to take care of his father for the first time in his life. While Rajiv struggles to juggle his responsibilities back home, Daya starts to bloom as he finds a sense of community in the hotel, and a companion in the 75-year old Vimla. As the days go by and Daya shows no sign of dying, Rajiv is faced with the dilemma of whether to remain there with his father or fulfill his duty back home.

== Cast ==
- Adil Hussain as Rajiv
- Lalit Behl as Daya
- Geetanjali Kulkarni as Lata
- Palomi Ghosh as Sunita
- Navnindra Behl as Vimla
- Anil Rastogi as Mishraji

== Release ==
Mukti Bhawan had its world premiere on September 2, 2016 at the 73rd Venice International Film Festival while in India its release date was April 7, 2017.

== Reception ==
=== Box office ===
The film was a box office failure in India, where it only grossed ₹7.4 million ($113,634) domestically. However, the film has been a box office success overseas, particularly in Japan, where it ran in theaters for 100 days and then 150 days. The film also grossed $80,862 in other overseas territories, including South Korea, Spain, the United Kingdom, and United Arab Emirates.

=== Critical response ===
The film received universal critical acclaim. On Rotten Tomatoes, it has an approval rating of 100% based on 23 reviews, with an average rating of 7.53/10. The site's consensus reads: "Tender, perceptive, and beautifully filmed, Hotel Salvation tells a father-son story whose universal themes are further enriched by its picturesque setting". On Metacritic, another review aggregator, the film has a score of 80 out of 100 based on 4 critics, indicating "generally favorable reviews". Leslie Felperin of The Guardian gave the film a rating of 4 stars out of 5 and said that, "Shubhashish Bhutiani’s dreamy comedy drama about a businessman embarking on a final journey with his father is smart, spellbinding and achingly relatable". David Parkinson of Empire gave the film a rating of 4 stars out of 5 and said that, "Filmed on a modest budget with a subtle sense of place and pace, this highly impressive debut considers mortality with a wry compassion that's rare for such a young director".

Rajeev Masand gave the film a rating of 4 stars out of 5 saying that, "Mukti Bhawan is as much a celebration of life – complete with all its complexities and paradoxes – as it is a meditation on the harsh realities of getting old and dying. It is both poignant and uplifting. Beautifully shot and although languidly paced, Bhutiani delivers an evocative drama that has surely got to be one of the best films you’ll see this year." Raja Sen of NDTV gave the film a rating of 4.5 stars out of 5 and concluded his review by saying that, "In the way companionship and clarity can be found without looking. In the way an accountant works at learning to cook. In the way soap operas provide succour. Somewhere in the middle of this beautiful, meditative film comes the greatest lesson of all: that a perfect, poetic goodbye doesn't have to wait for the end.". Shubhra Gupta of The Indian Express gave the film a rating of 3.5 stars out of 5 and said that, "There’s much to like about Mukti Bhawan. It brings to us themes which are either ignored or dealt with in our cinema with mawkishness and heavy sentimentality. Bhutiani removes the cloyingness and replaces it with a moving matter-of-fact acceptance of the final destination: this is a director to watch out for."

Nihit Bhave of The Times of India gave the film a rating of 3.5 stars out of 5 and said that, "Bhutiani has assembled a stellar cast of theatre greats and indie-film favourites. Behl and Hussain are endearing as the father-son duo, frustrated by and fond of each other simultaneously. The plot is too skimpy and with its languid pacing, the movie eventually seems a bit indulgent. The filmmaker’s exposure to slow, contemplative festival films becomes apparent. But the unassuming characters and the humour make it a delightful watch." Sukanya Verma of Rediff gave the film a rating of 4 stars out of 5 and concluded her review by saying that, "Mukti Bhawan is a work of staggering depth and sublime vision".

== Awards and nominations ==
Date of ceremony	Awards	Category	Recipient(s) and nominee(s)	Result	Ref.
2016	UNESCO Gandhi Medal (Paris)	Best Film	Hotel Salvation	Won	
2016	Biennale College Cinema Awards (Venice)	Best Film	Hotel Salvation	Won	
2016	New York Indian Film Festival	Best Film	Hotel Salvation	Won	
2016	Busan International Film Festival (South Korea)	Asia Cinema Fund	Hotel Salvation	Won	
2017	The Vesoul Film Festival (France)	Critics Choice Award	Hotel Salvation	Won	
2017	Indie Meme Festival (USA)	Audience Choice Award	Hotel Salvation	Won	
2017	Stuttgart Indian Film Festival (Germany)	Audience Choice Award	Hotel Salvation	Won	
2017	MOOOV Festival (Belgium)	Behind the Scenes	Hotel Salvation	Won	
2017	Festival du Film d’Asie	Jury Award	Hotel Salvation	Won	
2017	DC South Asian Film Festival (USA)	Best Actor	Adil Hussain	Won	
2017	Jagran Film Festival	Best Actor (Special Mention)	Adil Hussain	Won	
2017	Jagran Film Festival	Best Debut Director	Shubhashish Bhutiani	Won	
3 March 2017	National Film Awards	Special Mention	Director: Shubhashish Bhutiani Producer: Red Carpet Moving Pictures	Won	
3 March 2017	National Film Awards	Special Mention	Adil Hussain	Won	
15-18 January 2018	Rajasthan International Film Festival	Best Film	Mukti Bhawan	Won	
15-18 January 2018	Rajasthan International Film Festival	Best Actor	Adil Hussain	Won	
15-18 January 2018	Rajasthan International Film Festival	Best Director	Shubhashish Bhutiani	Won	
20 January 2018	Filmfare Awards	Best Screenplay	Shubhashish Bhutiani	Won	
20 January 2018	Filmfare Awards	Best Story	Shubhashish Bhutiani	Nominated	
20 January 2018	Filmfare Awards	Best Background Score	Tajdar Junaid	Nominated	
20 January 2018	Filmfare Awards	Best Film (Critics)	Mukti Bhawan	Nominated	
6 March 2018	Bollywood Film Journalists Awards	Best Story (Original)	Shubhashish Bhutiani	Won	
6 March 2018	Bollywood Film Journalists Awards	Best Screenplay	Shubhashish Bhutiani	Won	
20 March 2018	News18 Reel Movie Awards	Best Screenplay	Shubhashish Bhutiani	Won	
20 March 2018	News18 Reel Movie Awards	Best Director	Shubhashish Bhutiani	Nominated	
20 March 2018	News18 Reel Movie Awards	Best Film	Mukti Bhawan	Won	
20 March 2018	News18 Reel Movie Awards	Best Actor	Adil Hussain	Nominated	
20 March 2018	News18 Reel Movie Awards	Best Supporting Actor	Lalit Behl	Nominated	
20 March 2018	News18 Reel Movie Awards	Best Cinematography	Michael McSweeney, David Huwiler	Nominated	
20 March 2018	News18 Reel Movie Awards	Best Editing	Manas Mittal	Nominated	
