= Kanu Behl =

Indian film director and screenwriter

- Born: 1980 (age 45–46); Kapurthala, Punjab, India
- Education: Satyajit Ray Film and Television Institute
- Occupations: Director, writer
- Years active: 2005–present
- Spouse: Sneha Khanwalkar (m. 2019)
- Parent(s): Lalit Behl; Navnindra Behl

Kanu Behl (born 1980) is an Indian film director and screenwriter. He is known for his work in Hindi cinema.

He assisted director Dibaker Banerjee on the cult hit Oye Lucky! Lucky Oye! and co-wrote LSD: Love Sex aur Dhokha.

His directorial debut, Titli, appeared at several international film festivals, including Melbourne, Rio de Janeiro, Zurich, Filmfest Hamburg, and BFI London. The script of Titli was selected by NFDC for the Screenwriters' Lab 2012, later winning the Post Production Award at Film Bazaar's Work-In-Progress Lab.

Titli was nominated for Caméra d'Or at 2014 Cannes Film Festival.

== Early life and education ==
Kanu Behl spent his early years in Patiala, Punjab before moving to Delhi in 1990. Both his parents, Navnindra Behl and Lalit Behl were writer-actor-directors and also directed telefilms for the state-run Doordarshan channel.

He studied at Apeejay School, Noida and sought a bachelor's degree in business from Shaheed Sukhdev College of Business Studies, Delhi University. In 2003, he joined the Satyajit Ray Film and Television Institute and pursued a PG Diploma in Cinema. While at the institute, he attended the Berlinale Talent Campus 2007 and made his documentary 'An Actor Prepares', about a struggling actor, who after seven years decides to give himself 15 days to make it in the film industry or return home. The documentary entered competitively at Cinéma du Réel 2007, a documentary film festival in France.

In January 2019, Behl married music composer Sneha Khanwalkar.

== Career ==
After graduating from SRFTI, he produced and directed documentaries for the international channels NHK, Japan and ZDF/Arte. He worked with Dibakar Banerjee on the feature film Oye Lucky! Lucky Oye! as an Assistant director. In 2010, he co-wrote the critically acclaimed Love Sex aur Dhokha with Banerjee and was chief assistant director on the project.

In 2012, the script of his first independent feature film Titli, was selected by NFDC for the Screenwriters' Lab 2012, which later won the 'Post-Production Award' at Film Bazaar's Work-In-Progress Lab in 2013. Titli, appeared at several international film festivals, including the 2014 Cannes Film Festival, Melbourne International Film Festival, Rio de Janeiro International, Zurich Film Festival, Filmfest Hamburg, BFI London Film Festival and the Chicago International Film Festival. Written and directed by Behl and co-produced by Dibakar Banerjee Productions and Yash Raj Films, Titli was selected to take part in the Un Certain Regard section of the 2014 Cannes Film Festival.

== Filmography ==
Year	Film	Credited as				Notes	Ref(s)
Year	Film	Director	Writer	Lyricist	Other	Notes	Ref(s)
2008	Oye Lucky! Lucky Oye!			Yes	Assistant director		
2008	Dahleez Paar			Yes	Editor	TV movie	
2008	Three Blind Men	Yes	Yes			Short film	
2010	Love Sex Aur Dhokha		Yes	Yes	First assistant director		
2014	Titli	Yes	Yes			Directorial debut	
2019	Binnu Ka Sapna	Yes	Yes			Short film	
2023	Agra	Yes	Yes		Producer	Premiered in the Directors' Fortnight section of the Cannes and screened at the BIFF in October 2023.	
2024	Despatch	Yes	Yes			Premiered at the MAMI Mumbai Film Festival 2024 under the Gala Premieres section.	

== Awards and nominations ==
- Nominated for 56th Filmfare Awards in Best Screenplay Category for film Love, Sex Aur Dhoka.
- Nominated for Apsara Awards in Best Screenplay Category for film Love, Sex Aur Dhoka.
- Nominated for Caméra d'Or at 2014 Cannes Film Festival
- Critics Prize at Fifib, Bordeaux
- Best Film at Seattle South Asian Film Festival
- NETPAC Award at Hawaii International Film Festival
- Best Film at SAIFF, New York
- Best International Film at Malatya International, Turkey
- Best Actress and Best Film, Gijón International Film Festival, Spain
- Best Foreign First Film (Critics Award) at French Syndicate of Cinema Critics 2016
- Special Jury Prize at Jio MAMI Mumbai Film Festival 2023
