= Moothon =

2019 Indian film by Geetu Mohandas

Moothon (The Elder One)
- Theatrical release poster
- Directed by: Geetu Mohandas
- Written by: Geetu Mohandas
- dialogue by: Anurag Kashyap (Hindi)
- Produced by: Anurag Kashyap; S. Vinod Kumar; Ajay G. Rai; Alan McAlex
- Starring: Nivin Pauly; Shashank Arora; Sanjana Dipu; Sobhita Dhulipala; Melissa Raju Thomas; Roshan Mathew
- Cinematography: Rajeev Ravi
- Edited by: B. Ajithkumar; Kiran Das
- Music by: Songs: Shashank Arora; Score: Sagar Desai
- Production companies: JAR Pictures; Good Bad Films; Mini Studio
- Distributed by: Mini Studio
- Release dates: September 2019 (Toronto International Film Festival); 8 November 2019 (India)
- Running time: 110 minutes
- Country: India
- Languages: Malayalam (Jeseri); Hindi

Moothon (transl. The Elder One), also known internationally as The Elder One, is a 2019 Indian Malayalam-language action drama film written and directed by Geetu Mohandas, and jointly produced by S. Vinod Kumar, Anurag Kashyap, Ajay G. Rai and Alan McAlex. Featuring a bilingual narrative in the Jeseri dialect of Malayalam and Hindi, the film stars Nivin Pauly, Shashank Arora, Sobhita Dhulipala, Melissa Raju Thomas, Sanjana Dipu and Roshan Mathew. Hindi-language dialogues were written by Anurag Kashyap. The film premiered at the 2019 Toronto International Film Festival and received a positive critical response. It was included in The Hindu's top 25 Malayalam films of the decade and is widely regarded as one of the defining movies of the New Wave Movement.

== Plot ==
Mulla, a 14-year-old boy from Lakshadweep, travels to Mumbai in search of his Moothon (elder brother), Akbar, who left the island for Mumbai many years ago. Mulla lives in the islands under the care of Moosa, a fisherman. He is seen to be wearing baggy clothes and does not go to school, due to bullying. The bullies make him wear lipstick and a veil, making him hate feminine clothes. He laments his brother and tries to search for him. Moosa tells him to drop the issue, stop imitating his brother's mannerisms, and tells him that he cannot become Moothon by wearing his clothes.

He suspects that Moothon left due to an affair with Aamina and tries to get her number. Moosa responds that the only Aamina he knows is a fish. However, he manages to get her number. One day, while getting bullied, his friends help him strike back. However, Mulla gets slapped by Moosa for this, and he leaves the island by taking a boat under the cover of darkness and is hit by a large wave in the ocean, capsizing the boat. He hallucinates a mermaid rescuing him, but in fact, he gets rescued by a ship.

The ship authorities send him to a police station, and there is a communication barrier as he does not know Hindi. From there, he is sent to a government-funded orphanage. He is hesitant in taking a bath together with the boys, and from there, he befriends Raju. The warden tries to molest him, but he manages to escape from him due to Raju's intervention. Raju tells about his mother, Rosy, and where he could find her. Mulla escapes from there in search of Rosy. Mulla finds her to be a prostitute, who helps him. She provides him shelter and introduces him to a tea seller, who gives him a livelihood selling tea. The neighborhood boys bully him and steal his money, which he had been saving for calling Aamina.

While resting on the street after work, he gets kidnapped by Bhai, a local goon involved in child trafficking and drug dealing. He tries to escape, but is caught by the street boys working for Bhai. Bhai plans on selling him, and Bhai's sidekick, Salim, sets up a deal. Bhai himself is from the islands and understands Malayalam. One day, Bhai orders him to deliver a package. However, on seeing a cop, he flees, dropping the package with smartphones dropping out. Mulla comes back to Bhai's base and tries to steal cash to take his phone. Seeing this, Bhai is enraged and slaps him. He reveals that he was trying to find his moothon Akbar and that he is, in fact, his younger sister, Mulla. Bhai is shocked on hearing the revelation, and understands that Mulla is, in fact his younger sister, although Bhai does not reveal this to her. Bhai warns her to stay inside until he comes back. One of the boys from the street enters the house looking for her, as while she was bathing, he found out that she is a girl.

In a flashback, Bhai lives in Lakshwadweep as Akbar and is a performer of the Muslim ritual Kuthu Ratheeb, along with Moosa. They are professional ritual dancers and during one such performance, he made eye contact with a young man named Ameer, who had just returned from Bombay. Ameer was Aamina's brother. Aamina is close with Akbar's family. Ameer was a mute and had learnt sign language from Bombay, though only Akbar happens to understand it at least partly. Ameer was romantically interested in Akbar, however, Akbar was at first, ambivalent about expressing his feelings. Ameer invited Akbar to his home when Aamina and her mother were away. Akbar went to meet Ameer that night. Their relationship upset Akbar's family; Moosa beat up and warned Ameer to stay away from Akbar. Ameer got engaged to a woman, but he wanted to leave the island with Akbar and settle in Bombay. Akbar disapproved of the plan, leading Ameer to commit suicide.

In the present, Akbar, knowing that his boss is looking to punish Mulla for dropping the package, approaches Aamina, who now works as a cabaret dancer in Mumbai. Akbar asks her to take care of Mulla, but she refuses. So he leaves Mulla under the care of his transgender friend, Lateef. The don threatens to kill Akbar and Salim, if he does not receive the money lost for the dropped package. But Akbar claims a bigger assignment to pay the debt. He is assigned with 20 other thugs to transfer a huge amount of money to a middleman, but fails to do so as he is ambushed by another gang in a car chase, after being backstabbed by a gang member. Later, Lateef returns home high on drugs and attempts to get Mulla to try them too, which frightens her and makes her run away from him. Later Lateef tells Mulla to accept who she is and dress appropriately. She goes back to Akbar's base only to realise that he has been caught by the police.

Salim uses this opportunity to sell her. Lateef bails Akbar out of jail, and upon release, he comes to know that Mulla has been sold. He beats up Salim asking for her whereabouts. He takes Akbar to the place where he sold her, where Akbar is shocked on seeing something and gets shot at the same time.In the next scene, it is revealed that a year has passed. One of Akbar's street boys who once tried to propose to Mulla knocks on the door of a brothel room, only for Mulla to open it with long hair, wearing women's clothing and smiling.

== Cast ==
- Nivin Pauly as Akbar/Bhai
- Sanjana Dipu as Mulla, Akbar's sibling
- Shashank Arora as Salim
- Sobhita Dhulipala as Rosy
- Dileesh Pothan as Moosa
- Roshan Mathew as Ameer, Akbar's love interest
- Anjaly Devi as Ameer's wife
- Harish Khanna as Karim
- Sujith Shankar as Lateef
- Melissa Raju Thomas as Aamina
- Vipin Sharma as Warden
- Ajay Indrajeet Yadav as Pikku
- Mini as Akbar's mother

== Production ==
The screenplay was written by Geetu Mohandas originally under the title Insha' Allah: In Pursuit of Akbar. The story was about a teenager who is in search of his elder brother Akbar. For the script, Geetu won the Global Filmmaking Award at the 2016 Sundance Film Festival, along with four other filmmakers. In January 2016, she announced that it would be made into a feature film in Malayalam and Hindi languages, and filming would commence post monsoon that year.

In January 2017, the cast and crew were revealed along with a poster. The title was changed to Moothon (meaning: elder brother, in Malayalam). Produced jointly by Aanand L. Rai for Colour Yellow Productions and Ajay G. Rai and Alan McAlex for JAR Pictures, the film will be distributed by Eros International. Anurag Kashyap wrote the Hindi dialogues. Nivin Pauly plays the leading role along with Shashank Arora as the negative lead. Geetu has mentioned in her interviews that Nivin was not the first person to come to her mind to play the protagonist, after completing the screenplay. She toggled with many names, and eventually, the role fell into Nivin's lap. Geetu has reiterated that in this movie, she was not looking for actors but wanted to cast the person in the actor. Her husband Rajeev Ravi handles the cinematography. The film marks Geetu's feature directorial debut in Malayalam. Geetu called the film an "adventure drama", even though she does not believe in confining it into a clear-cut genre, saying "it can always turn into something else".

Filming in Mumbai was concluded by second week of May 2017. Filming resumed in Lakshadweep in May 2018. It was completed on 14 May 2018.

== Release ==
The film premiered at the Toronto International Film Festival in September 2019, with the cast and crew in attendance. It was screened at the Mumbai Film Festival on October 18, 2019. Pauly has stated during an interview that the filmmakers planned for Moothon released theatrically on 8 November 2019. The film was dubbed in Telugu with same title and released on Aha.

=== Critical reception ===
'Moothon' received generally positive reviews from the critics. On the review aggregator website Rotten Tomatoes, 100% of 6 critics' reviews are positive, with an average rating of 7/10.

Sify rated the movie 4 on 5 stars and said,"Moothon treads on an unconventional terrain for Malayalam and opens a fascinating world for the viewer. Don't miss this one!" The News Minute rated the movie 4 on 5 stars and said, "Geetu Mohandas-Nivin Pauly deliver a brilliant film" The Times of India rated the movie 4 on 5 stars and said, "Moothon is what happens when a powerful story meets a competent director who ropes in some of the best artists and technicians, knowing exactly what to get from them, and how. Moothon is a brave film."

The New Indian Express reviewed, "A welcome change for Malayalam film industry overdosed by feel-good films" The Indian Express rated the movie 3 on 5 stars and said, "Nivin Pauly delivers in this dark existential drama." Behindwood rated the movie 3.25 stars on 5 and reviewed, "Moothon is packed with top-notch performances. Nivin Pauly beautifully straddles the contrasting sides of Akbar's character while Roshan Matthew memorably plays the sensitivity of Aamir. Shashank Arora deserves a special mention as Sameer. Moothon is a visceral, grim yet optimistic exploration of human nature."

Dennis Harvey from Variety wrote that "The film benefits from strong performances, particularly by the male leads in the flashback. It also sports flavorful cinematography (Rajeev Ravi) and production design (Abid T.P.). But a story with this much woe on its plate needs to slow down more often to let us fully absorb the cruel turns of fate, and “The Elder One” is often in a confounding rush". The Hindu wrote about the movie as, "Although it does not play out smoothly all through, Moothon has enough depth in it for us to dive deep, and come back with material to ponder. Geetu Mohandas makes a brave statement with her first film in Malayalam." HuffPost wrote, "Nivin Pauly Is Spot On, But Let Down By Inconsistent Writing." Baradwaj Rangan of Film Companion South wrote "One part of me wished this ambitious film had stuck to one story in one timeline, but in a strange way, this in-between mood is what makes the events stand out".

== Awards and nominations ==
Year	Award	Category	Recipient	Result	Notes
2020	New York Indian Film Festival	Best Actor	Nivin Pauly	Won	
2020	New York Indian Film Festival	Best Child Actor	Sanjana Dipu	Won	
2020	New York Indian Film Festival	Best Director	Geetu Mohandas	Nominated	
2020	New York Indian Film Festival	Best Film	Moothon	Won	
2020	Kerala State Film Awards	Special Mention	Nivin Pauly	Won	
2020	22nd Asianet Film Awards	Golden Star of The Year	Nivin Pauly	Won	Along with Love Action Drama
