= Lalit Behl =

Indian actor, director, producer (1949–2021)

- Behl in the Serial Sada-E-Vadi
- Born: 15 August 1949; India
- Died: 23 April 2021 (aged 71)
- Occupations: Actor; director; producer; writer
- Spouse: Navnindra Behl
- Children: Kanu Behl

Lalit Behl & Navnindra Behl in the serial Afsane

Lalit Behl with Dolly Ahluwalia in a play

Lalit Behl (15 August 1949 – 23 April 2021) was an Indian actor, director, producer and writer.

== Early life ==
Lali Behl started acting as a college student and won inter varsity contest. He formed a theatre group at Kapurthala (Punjab) along with theatre enthusiasts Satish Sharma, Ravi Deep, Pramod Moutho Kamal Sharma his college friend and Harjeet Walia. He directed a number of stage plays including Kya Number Badlega, Chhatrian, Nayak Katha, Hara Samander Gopichander, Kumarswami and Suryast. He was a gold medalist from the Department of Indian Theatre, Panjab University, Chandigarh. He acted in plays by Mohan Maharishi.

== Career ==
Lalit Behl shifted to Delhi after doing his diploma in Indian Theatre and worked with Shriram Center and National School of Drama Repertory Company as a stage actor. He left his job to jump into the arena of television as a freelance producer director. He has produced and directed for Doordarshan telefilms such as Tapish, Happy Birthday, Aatish and Sunehri Jild and TV serials including Afsane, Ved Vyas Ke Pote, Mahasangram, Khanabadosh, Viji and Sada-e-Vadi.

=== As producer ===
- Tapish (Hindi Telefilm)
- Happy Birthday (Hindi Telefilm)
- Aatish (Hindi Telefilm)
- Afsane (Hindi TV Serial)
- Ved Vyas Ke Pote (Hindi TV Serial)
- Mahasangram (TV Serial)
- Viji (TV Serial)
- Khanabadosh (Urdu TV Serial)
- Sunehri Jild (Punjabi Telefilm)
- Sada-E-Vadi (Hindi TV Serial)

=== As director ===
- Kya Number Badlega (Stage Play)
- Surya Ki Antim Kiran Se surya Ki Pehli Kiran Tak (Stage Play)
- Suryast (Stage Play)
- Tapish (Hindi Telefilm)
- Happy Birthday (Hindi Telefilm)
- Aatish (Hindi Telefilm)
- Afsane (Hindi TV Serial)
- Ved Vyas Ke Pote (Hindi TV Serial)
- Mahasangram (TV Serial)
- Viji (TV Serial)
- Khanabadosh (Urdu TV Serial)
- Sunehri Jild (Punjabi Telefilm)
- Sada-E-Vadi (Hindi TV Serial)

=== As actor ===
- Naye Khudaa (Stage Play)
- Godot Ki Aamad (Stage Play)
- Surya Ki Antim Kiran Se surya Ki Pehli Kiran Tak, (Stage Play 1976)
- Supne Te Parchhaven (Punjabi TV Serial)
- Kumarswami (Stage Play)
- Suryast (Stage Play)
- Joseph K. Ka Muqaddama (Stage Play 1981)
- Death of a Salesman (Stage Play)
- Tapish (Hindi Telefilm)
- Chirion Ka Chamba (Hindi Telefilm)
- Rani Kokilan (Telefilm)
- Happy Birthday (Hindi Telefilm)
- Aatish (Hindi Telefilm)
- Afsane (Hindi TV Serial)
- Sunehri Jild (Punjabi Telefilm)
- Sada-E-Vadi (Hindi TV Serial)
- Titli (2014) (Hindi film)
- Mukti Bhawan (Hindi Feature Film)
- Made in Heaven -2019 (Indian Web Series - Amazon Prime)
- Judgementall Hai Kya - 2019

== Family and Death ==
Lalit Behl's wife Navnindra Behl was also a writer, director, producer and actress. His son, Kanu Behl, is a film writer and director. On 23 April 2021, Lalit died from Covid-19 complications at the age of 71.
