= Shashank Arora =

Actor, writer and musician

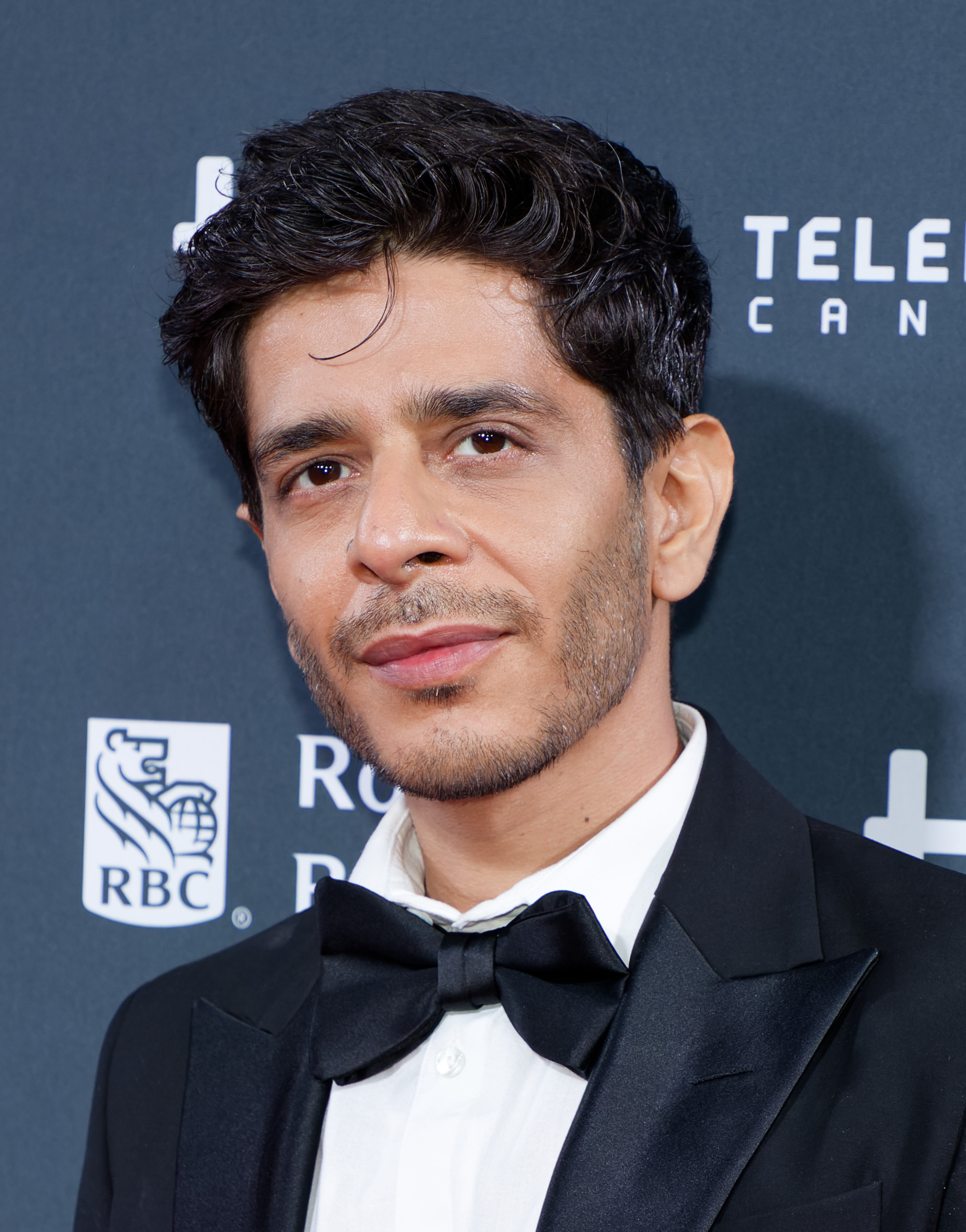
- Arora at the 2024 Toronto International Film Festival
- Born: 21 February 1989 (age 37); New Delhi, India
- Occupations: Actor; Musician; Writer
- Years active: 2012–present
- Known for: Titli, Brahman Naman, Moothon, Made in Heaven

Shashank Arora (born 21 February 1989) is an Indian actor, musician and writer. He is known for his roles in Titli (2014), Brahman Naman (2016), Moothon (2019),Made in Heaven (2019), and Superboys of Malegaon (2025). He is the only Indian actor to have films officially compete at Cannes and Sundance Film Festival.

== Early life and education ==
Arora was born on 21 February 1989, in New Delhi, India. He showed interest and excellence in music and theatre from a young age. After he completed high school in Delhi he left for higher education in Canada, where he also briefly joined a street theatre group formed by human rights activists. In late 2008, he moved to Mumbai where he studied acting for two years and began his career as an actor.

His parents are graphic designers and writers. He was inspired by the work of Francis Ford Coppola and Saeed Akhtar Mirza as a child. In order to pursue a career in film, Arora went to Concordia University, Montreal, Canada for his graduation in filmmaking, with music as a minor subject. After that, he came to Mumbai but was unable to find work, hence went back to studying. He credits his professor Robert Reece from the Actors Studio in Los Angeles for everything he knows. He later joined Whistling Woods International and Film and Television Institute of India as a guest teacher. He also worked under casting director Saher Latif.

== Career ==
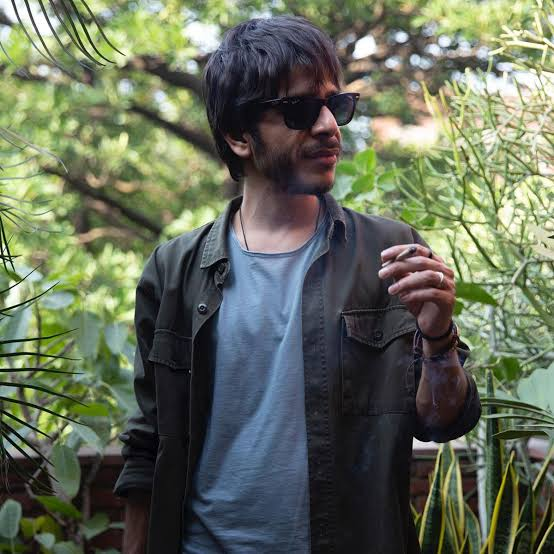
Arora in Mumbai, 2020

Arora first appeared as a supporting character in a movie titled Myoho (2012), as Ranjit. His first major role was the titular role in the critically acclaimed movie Titli (2014), produced by Yash Raj Films. The film competed at the 2014 Cannes Film Festival. The film went on to compete at many major festivals around the world and Arora was also nominated at Filmfare, Stardust and Zee Cine awards as best newcomer for his role in Titli the following year. In 2016, he played Naman in the movie Brahman Naman. The film went on to compete at the 2016 Sundance Film Festival, making Arora the first Indian actor to have films in Cannes and Sundance. Next, he played the role of Uday, a bass player in the movie Rock On 2 in the same year.

In 2017, he portrayed the role of Bicky, a drug peddler in the movie Zoo. The movie was India's first ever feature-length film shot completely on an IPhone 6s and went to compete at the Busan International film festival later that year. Zoo was later purchased by Netflix India. Shashank was seen next as Dhruv in the box office hit and critically acclaimed movie Lipstick Under My Burkha (2017). He was also seen in The Song of Scorpions with Irrfan Khan as Munna, in the same year. The film went on to open at the Locarno Film Festival in 2017. Later that year, it was announced that he would be seen portraying the titular character in a project titled Gangster Newton. The project is yet to hit the floors. Following that, Arora also essayed the role of Shaad Amritsari in Nandita Das' Manto in 2018. The film was Shashank's second in the Un Certain Regard category at the Cannes Film Festival, making him and Nawazuddin Siddiqui the first Indian actors to have two films in Un Certain Regard at Cannes. In the same year, he appeared in the short films, the Listener, directed by Tarun Judega, Letters, directed by Nitin Shingal and Others, directed by Sachin Shinde. In 2019, Arora was seen in the Amazon Prime series Made In Heaven as Kabir Basrai, a photographer. He was also seen portraying the role of Salman Khan's younger brother, Chote in Bharat. He was also seen in the Malayalam-Hindi bilingual film Moothon, which marked his debut in Malayalam cinema. The film went on to premier at the 2019 Toronto Film Festival. In 2019, he appeared in Nandita Das' video India's Got Colour.

== Filmography ==
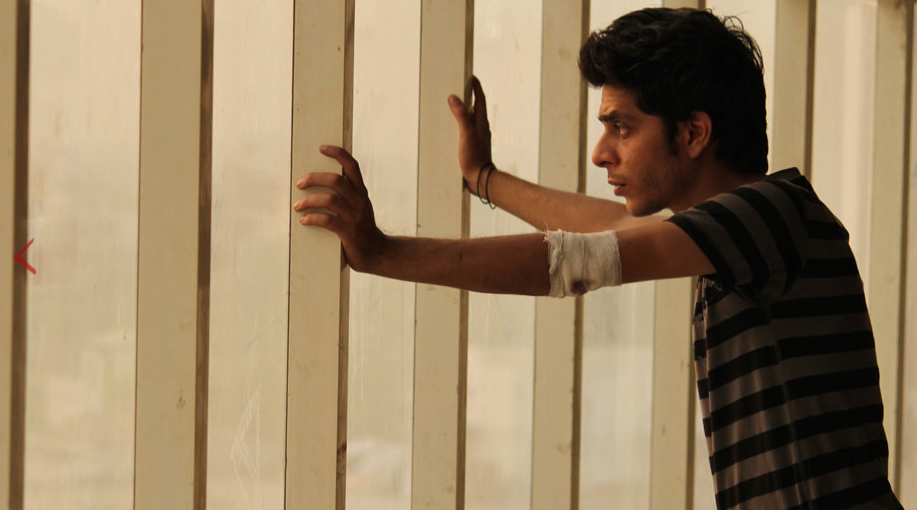
Arora on the sets of Titli

Key
| † | Denotes films that have not yet been released |

| Year | Film | Character | Language | Notes |
|---|---|---|---|---|
| 2012 | Myoho | Ranjit | Hindi | |
| 2014 | Titli | Titli | Hindi | |
| 2016 | Brahman Naman | Naman | English; Kannada | |
| 2016 | Rock On 2 | Uday | Hindi | |
| 2017 | Zoo | Bicky | Hindi | |
| 2017 | Lipstick Under My Burkha | Dhruv | Hindi | |
| 2017 | The Song of Scorpions | Munna | Rajasthani | |
| 2018 | Manto | Shaad | Hindi; Urdu | |
| 2018 | Penalty | Parth | Hindi | |
| 2019 | Moothon | Salim | Malayalam; Hindi | |
| 2019 | Bharat | Chote | Hindi | |
| 2023 | Neeyat | Ryan Kapoor | Hindi | |
| 2025 | Superboys of Malegaon | Shafique | Hindi | |
| 2025 | WingMan (The Universal Irony of Love) | Omi | Hindi | |

=== Short films ===
| Year | Name | Director | Notes |
|---|---|---|---|
| 2018 | The Listener | Tarun Juneja | |
| 2018 | Letters | Nitin Shingal | |
| 2018 | Others | Sachin Shinde | |
| 2019 | 377 Ab Normal | Faruk Kabir | |

=== TV shows ===
| Year | Show | Platform | Character | Notes |
|---|---|---|---|---|
| 2019–present | Made in Heaven | Amazon Prime | Kabir Basrai | |
| 2020 | Gangster Newton | | Newton | |
| 2022 | The Great Indian Murder | Disney+ Hotstar | Munna | |
| 2022 | Tanaav | SonyLIV | Junaid | |

== Discography ==
| Year | Song | Movie/Albums | Composer |
|---|---|---|---|
| 2019 | Bikhre | Moothon | Himself |
| 2020 | Mere Saathiyon | Single | Himself |
| 2020 | Dhamki (A lullaby) | Single | Himself |
| 2020 | Ode to Butter Chicken, Pt .1 | Single | Himself |

== Awards and nominations ==
| Year | Film | Award | Category | Result |
|---|---|---|---|---|
| 2015 | Titli | Stardust Awards | Best Acting Debut | Nominated |
| 2015 | Titli | Star Screen Awards | Best Debut Actor | Nominated |
| 2015 | Titli | Zee Cine Awards | Best Debut Actor | Nominated |
| 2015 | Titli | Filmfare Awards | Best Debut Actor | Nominated |
| 2015 | Moothon | Indian Film Festival Cincinnati | Best Supporting Actor | Won |
