= Melissa Raju Thomas =

Indian film actress, screenwriter and model

- Born: 2 July 1992 (age 33); Deolali, Maharashtra
- Education: National University of Singapore
- Occupations: Actress; screenwriter; model
- Years active: 2019–present
- Known for: Moothon
- Height: 5 ft 7 in (170 cm)

Melissa Raju Thomas is an Indian actress, screenwriter and model. She made her feature film debut in Geetu Mohandas' bilingual film Moothon (2019).

== Early life and education ==
At 13 years old, Melissa was scouted by a talent hunt reality contest in Kerala. At the time, she was only in 8th standard and was cast as a VJ for various shows on the leading Malayalam TV channel, Asianet. She soon became a popular VJ of the Malayalam show, "Valkannadi". She eventually stop VJ-ing to focus on her studies.

After completing her lower secondary education (Class X), Melissa moved to Singapore to study for the GCE 'A' Levels. In 2012, Melissa was crowned the winner of the Navy Queen 2012 beauty pageant. After winning the pageant, she went back to Singapore to complete her undergraduate studies at the National University of Singapore, during the course of which she made it onto the Dean's Honour Roll twice, in Academic Years 2011–12 and 2012–13.

== Career ==
From 2016 to 2018, Melissa starred in various print and television advertisements including Television Commercials for major brands like "Mercedes Benz", "Kalyan Jewellers" and "Malabar Gold and Diamonds".

In January 2019, Melissa wrote and starred in the well-received short film Faded.

In 2019, she made her feature film debut in Geetu Mohandas' bilingual film Moothon (2019), which premiered at the Toronto International Film Festival 2019 internationally and at the Mumbai Film Festival 2019 in India. She played the challenging role of the character Amina, a village girl from Lakshadweep who reaches Mumbai and undergoes transformation.

In 2020, she was cast for an interesting special appearance role in Bejoy Nambiar’s film Taish. She has also mentioned that she is currently writing and working on new scripts.

== Filmography ==
=== Films ===
Year	Title	Role	Notes
2019	Moothon	Amina	

=== Web series ===
Year	Title	Role	Platform	Notes
2020	Taish	Simmi	ZEE5	
