= Shubhashish Bhutiani =

Indian film director

- Born: 20 July 1991 (age 35); Kolkata, West Bengal, India
- Education: SVA, New York
- Occupations: Film director, actor, screenwriter, script writer
- Years active: 2010-present
- Parent: Sanjay Bhutiani (Father)

Shubhashish Bhutiani (born 20 July 1991) is an Indian film director, actor, screenwriter and script writer. He made his directorial debut in Bollywood with the film Mukti Bhawan based on relationships and family. He won National Film Award – Special Mention (feature film) for directing Mukti Bhawan at 64th National Film Awards.

Mumbai-based Bhutiani was just 21 when he wrote and directed Kush, his thesis film for his undergraduate course at the School of Visual Arts, New York. Set against the backdrop of the 1984 anti-Sikh riots, the 25-minute film showcased his sensitivity and craftsmanship. It also won him several laurels: an award at the 2013 Venice International Film Festival, the National Film Award for Best Promotional Film (2013) and over 25 international awards. Kush was shortlisted for the 2014 Academy Award for Best Live Action Short Film.

== Biography ==
Shubhashish Bhutiani grew up in a small Himalayan town in India where he attended Woodstock School. After being heavily involved in theatre he transitioned from acting to writing/directing and went to learn filmmaking at the School of Visual Arts in New York. His thesis film, Kush, premiered at the 70th Venice International Film Festival where it won the Orizzonti Prize for Best Short Film. Kush was shortlisted at the 2014 Academy Awards and has won over 25 awards all over the globe.

== Filmography ==
Year	Film	Languages	Director	Producer	Writer	Actor	Notes
2010	The Road Home	English				Yes	Digital
2013	Kush	Hindi	Yes		Yes		Short Film
2017	Mukti Bhawan - Hotel Salvation	Hindi	Yes	Yes	Yes		

== Awards and nominations ==
- Kush

Academy Awards 2014 – Shortlisted for Live Action Short Film Venice International Film Festival 2013- Orizzonti Award for Best Short Film Venice International Film Festival 2013 – Best Innovative Budget Award Hamptons International Film Festival 2013 – Special Jury Prize for Cast Performances FilmLabFestival 2013 – Winner Best Short Film South Asian International Film Festival 2013 – HBO sponsored Best Short Film Award Cleveland International Film Festival – Honorable Mention in International Short Film Award Garden State Film Festival 2014 – Best International Narrative Short Vilnius International Film Festival – Audience Award Palm Springs Shortfest – HP Brigning The Borders Award Presented by Cinema Without Borders, Runner Up College Television Award 2014 – Best Director College Television Award 2014 – Best Short Film 2014 CINE Golden Eagle Award – Independent Division, Fiction Short National Award presented by the President of India Sikh International Film Festival – Best Short Film Indian International Film Festival of Los Angeles – Audience Award London Indian Film Festival – Satyajit Ray Award for Best Short Film Dusty Film and Animation Pre-Production Grant Dusty Film and Animation Post-Production Grant School of Visual Arts William Arkel Recipient 2013

- Mukti Bhawan

The film’s World Premiere was held at the 73rd Venice Film Festival 2016. Followed by Busan International Film Festival, South Korea 2016, Dubai International Film Festival 2016, EFM Berlin Film Festival, Goteborg Film Festival 2017, Sweden and Festival International Des Cinemas d’Asie De Vesoul, France 2017. The film was awarded the GRAND PRIX "ENRICHO FULCHIGNONI" and UNESCO Gandhi Medal at the Venice International Film Festival and is also the recipient of the Asia Cinema Fund by BIFF 2016, South Korea.It was adjudged the Critics Choice Award, Vesoul International Film Festival, France. It received a 10-minute standing ovation at the world premiere at Venice Film Festival.
