= The Song of Scorpions =

- Directed by: Anup Singh
- Written by: Anup Singh
- Produced by: Saskia Vischer; Shahaf Peled; Michel Merkt
- Starring: Golshifteh Farahani; Irrfan Khan; Waheeda Rehman; Shashank Arora
- Cinematography: Pietro Zuercher; Carlotta Holy-Steinemann
- Edited by: Marie-Pierre Frappier
- Music by: Béatrice Thiriet
- Production companies: Feather Light Films; KNM; Ciné-Sud Promotion; Aurora Media; M!Capital
- Distributed by: Agora Films; Panorama Spotlight; 70 MM Talkies
- Release dates: August 9, 2017 (Locarno); April 28, 2023 (India)
- Running time: 119 minutes
- Countries: France; Singapore; Switzerland
- Language: Hindi

The Song of Scorpions is a 2017 Hindi language drama film written and directed by Anup Singh. Produced by Feather Light Films and KNM, the film, set in the Thar desert in Rajasthan, stars Golshifteh Farahani as a tribal woman learning the ancient art of healing and Irrfan Khan as a camel trader.

The Song of Scorpions had its world premiere at the 70th Locarno Film Festival in Locarno, Switzerland on August 9, 2017.

== Plot ==
According to an ancient myth, the sting of a scorpion in Jaisalmer, Rajasthan can cause death in less than 24 hours and the only cure is the song sung by a scorpion singer which counters the poison of the scorpion.

Nooran is an independent young woman living in a far-flung, traditional village in the desert in western Rajasthan. She comes from a tribe of scorpion singers and works as one, i.e., she heals scorpion stings by singing the song of scorpions. Nooran is a beginner, yet she does not hesitate from taking up cases because it is a source of income for her. The villagers disapprove of her because of her independence and shrewdness. Even Nooran’s grandmother, Zubaida, an expert scorpion singer, rebukes her and tells her that she won’t ever accept the money Nooran earns by swindling poor people. Nooran cannot disappoint Zubaida as she loves her grandmother very much and she is the only one she has in the world. Nooran keeps some money from her hard-earned income and gives the rest to her friend, Amina, to donate at the local dargah in the village.

On one of her outings, Nooran catches the eye of a camel-trader named Adam. Adam falls instantly in love with Nooran and proposes marriage to Nooran who does not respond. Adam is thrashed by the men of Nooran’s village as he had tried to outrage the modesty of one of their women. Nooran later on confides in Amina about Adam, but it is not clear if she has feelings for him.

One night, Nooran gets a call that Adam’s young accomplice, Munna, has been bitten by a scorpion. Zubaida is hesitant about sending Nooran alone in the night, but Nooran accepts the task. Upon reaching Munna, Nooran realised that it was a trap. Munna rapes Nooran.

In the morning, Amina brings a wounded and traumatised Nooran home where Nooran gets another shock. Zubaida was missing. Nooran looks for her grandmother everywhere, but Zubaida is nowhere to be found. Out of grief and despair, Nooran locks herself up in the house. When Amina comes to check on Nooran, she finds young men outside the house, passing lewd comments on Nooran.

The villagers decide that Nooran be sent out of the village as she has brought a bad name upon them. The women openly suggest that Nooran go to a city and continue doing there what she’s done in the village, i.e., earn her livelihood by curing people through her half-learned skill or by selling herself. With Amina by her side, Nooran resists, but both friends know that nothing was in their hands.

Her helplessness drives Nooran to accept Adam’s marriage proposal. It is only when Nooran moves to Adam’s house after marriage that she realises that Adam is married and is father to a teenage daughter, Ayesha. Reluctantly, Nooran tries to adjust to her new circumstances and becomes a friend to Ayesha.

One night, after an altercation, Adam releases a scorpion upon Munna. Munna, bitten by the scorpion and in agony, asks Adam why he did so when he carried out everything that Adam asked him to do, implying that Munna raped Nooran upon Adam’s instructions and that Zubaida’s disappearance too could have been orchestrated by Adam.

A dying Munna comes to Nooran and reveals everything to her. Shocked, Nooran is unable to save Munna. She buries his dead body in the sand.

Nooran is revealed to be pregnant. While the female relatives celebrate, Nooran is miserable. It is not clear if the child Nooran is carrying is Munna’s or Adam’s.

Adam returns home one day to find Nooran missing. He goes looking for her in the dunes and finds that Nooran has let one of her pet scorpions bite her. While Nooran accuses Adam of all that he has done to her, a regretful Adam tells Nooran that he truly loves her, before letting one of Nooran’s scorpions bite him. It is then that Nooran starts singing a song of scorpions, but it is not known whether that song was meant to save herself or Adam or both of them.

== Cast ==
- Golshifteh Farahani as Nooran
- Irrfan Khan as Aadam
- Waheeda Rehman as Zubeidaa
- Shashank Arora as Munna
- Kritika Pande as Amina
- Sara Arjun as Ayesha
- Shefali Bhushan as Shakila
- Tillotama Shome as Lady of The Night

== Production ==
The film was a France-Switzerland-Singapore co-production with financing from France’s CNC Aide aux cinemas du monde and Eurimages, the Swiss Federal Office of Culture, Cineforom, Loterie Romande and Singapore-based film funds and distribution entities Aurora Media Holdings and M! Capital Ventures.

It was reported that the lead actors of the film Irrfan Khan and Golshifteh Farahani began shooting for the film in Jaisalmer, Rajasthan in December 2015.

== Release ==
The Song of Scorpions had its world premiere on the Piazza Grande at the 70th Locarno Film Festival in Locarno, Switzerland on August 9, 2017. It was released in India on 28 April 2023. It is being presented by Panorama Spotlight and 70 MM Talkies.

== Reception ==
=== Critical response ===
Gautaman Bhaskaran of The Hindustan Times rated the film highly, saying "The Song of Scorpions is a story set on the undulating golden sands of the Thar Desert in Rajasthan, the sights and sounds of the mesmeric atmosphere caught most imaginatively by cinematographer Pietro Zuercher. I was bowled over by the light and shade contrasts he presents - the harshness of the daytime desert rubbing shoulders with the darkness of a night illuminated by the light of a million stars, twinkling away and guiding Singh’s folktale narrated through pain, pathos, love, humiliation, revenge, pardon and forgiveness. I think Singh has this unique ability to fathom the human mind, and in a way, his plot resembles a Shakespearean drama - sans the drama."

Boyd van Hoeij of The Hollywood Reporter commended the cinematography of the film saying that, "The film is absolutely gorgeous to look at, with Swiss cinematographers Pietro Zuercher and Carlotta Holy-Steinemann relishing the opportunity to film a country that looks so unlike their own"."

Allan Hunter of Screen Daily praised the cinematography, direction and acting performances in the film saying that, "Although leisurely in places, The Song Of Scorpions retains its grip, especially as we grow more involved in Nooran’s refusal to become a victim and her response to the many challenges placed in her path. The material could easily have lent itself to melodrama or sentimentality but Singh’s understated direction lends it a steely conviction that is further underpinned by some deft casting."
