= Titli (2014 film) =

- Poster of Title at Cannes Film Festival
- Directed by: Kanu Behl
- Written by: Sharat Katariya; Kanu Behl
- Produced by: Aditya Chopra; Dibakar Banerjee
- Starring: Shashank Arora; Shivani Raghuvanshi; Ranvir Shorey; Amit Sial; Lalit Behl
- Cinematography: Siddharth Diwan
- Edited by: Namrata Rao
- Music by: Karan Gour
- Production companies: Yash Raj Films; Dibakar Banerjee Productions Pvt. Ltd.
- Distributed by: Yash Raj Films
- Release dates: 20 May 2014 (Cannes); 30 October 2015 (India)
- Running time: 124 minutes
- Country: India
- Language: Hindi

Titli (transl. Butterfly) is a 2014 Indian neo-noir crime drama film written and directed by Kanu Behl, and co-produced by Dibakar Banerjee Productions and Aditya Chopra under the banner of Yash Raj Films. It features actors Shashank Arora as the title character, Shivani Raghuvanshi, Ranvir Shorey, Amit Sial and Lalit Behl in the lead roles.

In Titli, Behl captures the volatility of a society where violence lies uneasily just below the surface. The directorial debut film premiered in the Un Certain Regard section of the 2014 Cannes Film Festival, The trailer was released on 29 September 2015. The film was released in India on 30 October 2015.

The international sales partner of the film is Westend Films.

== Plot ==
Titli is the youngest member of a violent car-jacking gang in Delhi with his brothers, oldest brother Vikram and middle brother Pradeep a.k.a. Bawla. The film opens with Titli inspecting a parking lot of an under-construction mall in East Delhi. His friend Pintu tells him that his fortunes will change once he buys the parking lot at a price of ₹3,00,000. Titli plans to escape from his family and their line of work. While attempting to escape the clutches of his brothers with the money after a car-jacking operation, he accidentally crashes a stolen car before a police checkpoint. This results in Pradeep and Titli getting nabbed by police. When they are released the next day, Titli finds out that the police have taken the money from his bag and he admits to his brothers that he was planning to run away and invest the money in a parking lot business.

Vikram forces Titli to marry Neelu to help control him and also to introduce a woman into the gang to be used as a decoy and cover. Neelu, though married to Titli, pines for her lover Prince, a wealthy married man she is having an affair with. One night, after witnessing a bloody jacking operation of her brothers-in-law, Neelu tries to escape from her family and gets caught by Titli. Titli supports Neelu's plans to leave him for Prince if she gives Titli ₹2,50,000 from her personal bank account. Neelu takes Titli to meet Prince, and shows him that she is in a serious relationship with him, in spite of him being married. Prince is planning to divorce his wife for Neelu. Meanwhile, Vikram's estranged wife Sangeeta comes and demands divorce from Vikram. Vikram is forced to sign the document by her lawyer who admits that she has the evidence of Vikram indulging in domestic violence with Sangeeta. Sangeeta also demands an alimony of ₹5,00,000 from Vikram. Titli's father initially proposes the idea of wiring the money of Neelu's FD, which Vikram refuses. Neelu asks Titli to deliver a birthday gift for Prince. But at Prince's house, he finds out that he is actually cheating on Neelu, in spite of being happy with his wife. Titli confronts Prince about it, who ends up blackmailing him for his money. Titli and Neelu request Sangeeta for an extension of the alimony deadline, but she refuses. Finally, they are given an opportunity of earning ₹20,00,000 by killing a big industrialist by a politically connected cop. Titli drops Neelu to her parents' residence and takes off with all the cash she gave him. Simultaneously, Titli anonymously reports his brothers to the police. After approving the parking lot deal with Pintu, he changes his mind and demands his money back by threatening to shoot Pintu's boss with a gun he stole from Vikram. In the end, Titli returns home and severs ties with his father and leaves with his belongings. Neelu finds out that Prince was never planning to leave his wife for her, and Neelu and Titli get back together.

== Cast ==
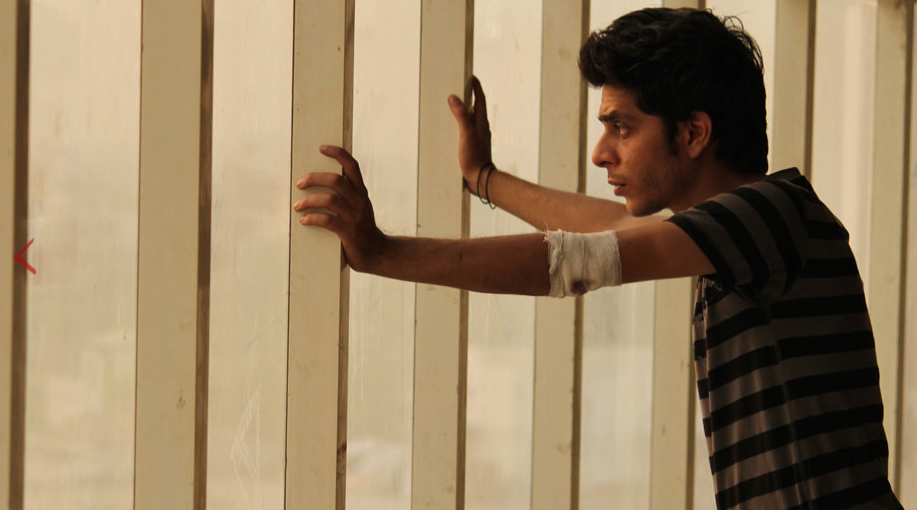
Arora played the character Titli

- Shashank Arora as Titli
- Shivani Raghuvanshi as Neelu
- Ranvir Shorey as Vikram
- Amit Sial as Pradeep
- Lalit Behl as Daddy
- Prashant Singh as Prince
- Eknoor Chawla as Daughter

== Production ==
=== Development ===
Behl, who co-wrote and also assisted director Dibakar Banerjee in Love Sex aur Dhokha (LSD) (2010), started writing Titli as LSD neared completion. In 2011, the news report of a car-jacker gang in Delhi led by a local goon, Joginder Joga, inspired him to start working on the story of a thriller. However, as he developed the script, other themes started joining in, from his personal experiences growing up in the city. Though he denied it being autobiographical, he mentioned in an interview that the idea of intra-family conflict was derived from his own clashes with his father as a rebellious teenager. He eventually co-wrote the script with Sharat Katariya, and it covered themes of patriarchy, family dysfunction, gender-based violence and oppression, and "a desire for freedom". Through the protagonist, the film also explores the circular nature of life – "how we often end up becoming exactly the person we are trying to run away from."

In 2012, the script of the film was selected for NFDC Film Bazaar's Screenwriter's Lab and won the Post-Production Award at Film Bazaar's Work-In-Progress Lab in 2013. It also won an award for Best Work-In-Progress Lab Project and was selected for Film Bazaar Recommends, where the 2014 Cannes Film Festival selection committee first saw the film.

=== Filming ===
For the lead roles, relative newcomers Shashank Arora and Shivani Raghuvanshi were selected. Actors Amit Sial and Ranvir Shorey were chosen to play the role of two elder brothers to Titli's character. Next, he decided to cast his own father Lalit Behl, who is a Delhi-based director and actor, for the role of the patriarch of the family, considering the film itself was based on his early life experiences.

The film was shot across various locations in Delhi. During filming, he allowed the actors to explore the scenes and improvise as no scripts were brought to the set. The production team redesigned a house to give a claustrophobic feel to the family home, where much of the filming was done, to provide a contrast from the expansive real world outside, which the protagonist is trying to escape into. For this purpose, rooms were made smaller, the entrance was made labyrinthine, and even the natural light was reduced in the rooms, so that the tube light haze could add to the effect.

By early May 2014, the movie's post-production was completed, ahead of its Cannes premiere due in the same month.

== Reception ==
=== Box office ===
The film collected ₹1.75 crore (US$180,000) nett in its first week.

=== Critical reception ===
The film has a Rotten Tomatoes rating of 93% with an average score of 7.6/10 based on 14 reviews. Jay Weisberg wrote that "the film plunges into [a] pitiless milieu with headstrong assurance, presenting a paternalistic world where corruption seeps into people's pores and women need backbones of steel to survive", calling it "a grittily impressive debut". The Hollywood Reporter's Deborah Young praised Namrata Rao's editing and Behl for "directing a largely non-pro cast, situating them carefully in the squalor of their Delhi surroundings." She called the film "an enjoyable, character-driven Indian yarn about an emotional family of criminals [that] gets better as it goes on." Brad Mariano of 4:3 "Recommended" the film, calling it "an impressive debut that is far from what one might expect from the Indian cinema", noting the influence of Pier Paolo Pasolini's neo-realism and the "complex, impossible moral situations" of Asghar Farhadi's films. He ended his review by calling it "a gripping debut film that could mark the arrival of a significant new voice in world cinema." J Hurtado of Screen Anarchy wrote that while "scenes of people scraping the bottom of the barrel are nothing new in Hindi independent cinema, [...] Behl's treatment of the material is both heart-wrenching, and vividly relatable as everyone tries to make out the best way they can without leaving anything on the table." He called it "a film about hope, and it's overwhelming sadness only makes the hope shine brighter", despite its "dark"-ness and its "low opinion of some of those people who populate Delhi's backstreets."

Rohit Vats of Hindustan Times called it "the best Hindi film of the year so far", giving it a perfect score of 5/5. He wrote that the film-makers "don't keep you at an objective distance. They challenge you to stop ignoring the so-called social blots, and once you're sucked in, they make you believe that the injustice behind the rough exterior is systematic." Uday Bhatia of LiveMint called the film "unrelentingly grim, morally unmoored". He wrote that the "emotional and physical violence in Titli is wince-inducing, but even more oppressive is the atmosphere of mistrust and desperation that Behl and his co-writer Sharat Katariya build up." A more mixed review came from Filmfare's Rachit Gupta who called the film "a little too blunt and all too intentionally" despite its "serious" themes.

=== International Film Festivals attended ===
- 2014 Cannes Film Festival
- 5th Beijing International Film Festival
- 13th Indian Film Festival of Los Angeles
- Melbourne International Film Festival
- Rio de Janeiro International
- International Film Festival of Colombo
- Zurich Film Festival
- Filmfest Hamburg
- Festival international du film indépendant de Bordeaux (Fifib)
- BFI London Film Festival
- Chicago International Film Festival
- Philadelphia Film Festival
- Seattle South Asian Film Festival
- Hawaii International Film Festival
- San Francisco International South Asian Film Festival (SFISAFF) by 3rd-i Films
- AFI Fest, Los Angeles
- South Asian International Film Festival (SAIFF), New York
- Black Movie Festival, Geneva
- International Film Festival Rotterdam, Netherlands
- Gothenburg Film Festival, Sweden
- Festival du film d'Asie du Sud Transgressif (FFAST), Paris
- Gijón International Film Festival, Spain

== Awards ==
=== Wins ===
- Critics Prize at FIFIB, Bordeaux
- Best Film at Seattle South Asian Film Festival
- NETPAC Award at Hawaii International Film Festival
- Best Film at SAIFF, New York,
- Best International Film at Malatya International, Turkey,
- Best Actress and Best Film, Gijón International Film Festival, Spain,
- Audience Award at Festival du Film d'Asie du Sud Transgressif (FFAST), Paris.
- Best Foreign First Film (Critics Award) at French Syndicate of Cinema Critics 2016

=== Nominations ===
- Caméra d'Or, 2014 Cannes Film Festival
