= Tanu Weds Manu Returns (soundtrack) =

Soundtrack album by Krsna Solo and Tanishk–Vayu
- Released: 1 May 2015
- Recorded: 2014–2015
- Genre: Feature film soundtrack
- Length: 40:54
- Language: Hindi
- Label: Eros Music

Krsna Solo chronology
India's Daughter (2015)	Tanu Weds Manu Returns (2015)	Mirza Juuliet (2018)

Tanishk–Vayu chronology
Roy (2015)	Tanu Weds Manu Returns (2015)	Aiyaary (2018)

Singles from Tanu Weds Manu Returns
- 1. "Banno" Released: 19 April 2015; 2. "Move On" Released: 25 April 2015

Tanu Weds Manu Returns is the soundtrack album to the 2015 film of the same name directed by Aanand L. Rai, starring R. Madhavan and Kangana Ranaut in dual roles; it is the sequel to Tanu Weds Manu (2011). The film's soundtrack is composed by Krsna Solo and Tanishk–Vayu (Note: a duo consisting of composer Tanishk Bagchi and lyricist Vayu Shrivastav), with lyrics written by Raj Shekhar, Vayu Shrivastav, N.S. Chauhan and Surjeet Singh Ral. The album was released through Eros Music on 1 May 2015 to positive reviews from critics and received numerous accolades.

== Development ==
Krsna Solo who composed music for Tanu Weds Manu had returned for the sequel. The first film's music was initially revolving around the introduction of the characters, the sequel expands in terms of scale and music, becoming it more contemporary and approachable. Krsna added "the story has matured and so has the music". The inclusion of urban elements resulted in Krsna using electronic music and had further composed a jazz number, which he stated "Despite being truly jazz, the lyrics are very Indian, and you know they belong to the world of TWM."

While Krsna had composed most of the tracks, one song "Banno" was composed and written by Tanishk–Vayu. Tanu Weds Manu Returns marked the film debut of composer Tanishk Bagchi; he previously worked as a music producer with Aditya Dev through The Shaukeens (2014) and composed the title song for the Colors TV show Thapki Pyar Ki (2015–2017). Rai had listened to the song "Oopar Oopar" which he and Vayu uploaded it on YouTube, and which he liked it. Rai then met the duo and asked to compose a wedding song. They then thought of "Banno Teri Ankhiyan Soorme" from the film Dushmani: A Violent Love Story (1995) which was a folk number. Bagchi adapted the tune of the folk number and modernized it after the duo and Rai, were not receptive of praising the bride's appearance as they found to be cliched and thought about the swagger she had, with the song being titled "Banno Tera Swagger".

== Release ==
The soundtrack preceded with "Banno" as the first single released on 19 April 2015. The second single "Move On" was released on 25 April. The soundtrack was released under Eros Music label on 1 May.

== Reception ==
Devesh Sharma of Filmfare, rating three stars out of five, called it as "another fine effort, from Krsna and Rajshekhar – it lacks a Rangrez for sure – but that was an inspired composition and so the writer-composer duo is forgiven for the lapse this time." Aelina Kapoor of Rediff.com also rated three stars and wrote "Tanu Weds Manu Returns album should have had fewer songs. With Mat Ja Re, Banno and Ghani Bawri as the centrepieces, and just a couple of situational songs such as Old School Girl and Move On, it would have fared much better."

Kasmin Fernandes of The Times of India described the music as "rollicking" and rated four out of five. In a mixed review, Sankhayan Ghosh of The Indian Express rated two-and-a-half out of five and added, "the music of this one [Tanu Weds Manu Returns] finds excellence only in parts." "Krsna offers a fitting follow-up, in terms of tone and variety, to his 2011 original score." Joginder Tuteja of Bollywood Hungama wrote "Except for a couple of songs towards the end, the music of Tanu Weds Manu Returns does hold on well." Sweta Kaushal of Hindustan Times wrote "Raj Shekhar's lyrics add to the desi connect in Tanu Weds Manu Returns. Every single song in the movie, from Banno to Mat Jaa Re to Ghani Bawri, all of them are an intrinsic part of the narrative."

== Legacy ==
After the release of Tanu Weds Manu Returns, the words "swag" and "swagger" became one of the most searched words in the online version of Oxford Dictionary of English. "Banno" topped the music charts since its release on 19 April and after the film, and its success prompted Bagchi to become one of the leading composers in Hindi film music scene. He debuted as a solo composer through "Bolna" from Kapoor & Sons (2016) and continued his stint, while also collaborating with Vayu Shrivastav on Bareilly Ki Barfi and Shubh Mangal Zyada Saavdhan (both 2017) amongst others. Despite the eventual success, Bagchi was often criticized from music fans and critics for recreating or remixing popular songs. "Banno" provided the breakthrough for Brijesh Shandilya—who began his singing stint since 2008—and also for Swati Sharma.

== Track listing ==
No.	Title	Lyrics	Music	Singer(s)	Length
1.	"Banno"	Vayu Shrivastav	Tanishk–Vayu	Brijesh Shandilya, Swati Sharma	03:16
2.	"Move On"	Raj Shekhar	Krsna Solo	Sunidhi Chauhan	04:10
3.	"Mat Ja Re"	Raj Shekhar	Krsna Solo	Ankit Tiwari	03:52
4.	"Ghani Bawri"	Raj Shekhar	Krsna Solo	Jyoti Nooran	04:14
5.	"Old School Girl"	Raj Shekhar	Krsna Solo	Anmol Malik	03:39
6.	"Old School Girl" (Haryanvi)	Raj Shekhar	Krsna Solo	Kalpana Gandharva	04:08
7.	"Ho Gaya Hai Pyar"	Raj Shekhar	Krsna Solo	Dev Negi	03:48
8.	"O Sathi Mere"	Raj Shekhar	Krsna Solo	Sonu Nigam	05:46
9.	"Ghani Bawri" (Remix)	Raj Shekhar	Krsna Solo	Jyoti Nooran	03:48
10.	"Mari Gali"	N. S. Chauhan, Surjeet Singh Ral	Krsna Solo	N.S. Chauhan, Dilbag Singh	04:13
11.	"Tanu Weds Manu Returns Mashup"	Vayu Shrivastav, Raj Shekhar	Krsna Solo, Tanishk–Vayu, DJ Kiran Kamath	Ankit Tiwari, Brijesh Shandilya, Jyoti Nooran, Swati Sharma, DJ Kiran Kamath	02:53
Total length:					43:47

== Accolades ==
Award	Date of ceremony (Note: Date is linked to the article about the awards held that year, wherever possible.)	Category	Recipient(s) and nominee(s)	Result	Ref.
BIG Star Entertainment Awards	13 December 2015	Most Entertaining Music	Krsna Solo	Nominated	
BIG Star Entertainment Awards	13 December 2015	Most Entertaining Singer – Female	Swati Sharma (for the song "Banno")	Nominated	
BIG Star Entertainment Awards	13 December 2015	Most Entertaining Song	Tanishk–Vayu (for the song "Banno")	Nominated	
Global Indian Music Academy Awards	6 April 2016	Best Music Debut	Swati Sharma (for the song "Banno")	Nominated	
Global Indian Music Academy Awards	6 April 2016	Best Music Debut	Tanishk–Vayu (for the song "Banno")	Nominated	
Global Indian Music Academy Awards	6 April 2016	Best Playback Singer – Critics	Jyoti Nooran (for the song "Banno")	Nominated	
Global Indian Music Academy Awards	6 April 2016	Best Duo/Group Song	Swati Sharma and Brijesh Shandllya (for the song "Banno")	Won	
Mirchi Music Awards	29 February 2016	Female Vocalist of the Year	Swati Sharma (for the song "Banno")	Nominated	
Mirchi Music Awards	29 February 2016	Upcoming Female Vocalist of the Year	Swati Sharma (for the song "Banno")	Nominated	
Mirchi Music Awards	29 February 2016	Upcoming Lyricist of the Year	Vayu (for the song "Banno")	Nominated	
Mirchi Music Awards	29 February 2016	Upcoming Male Vocalist of the Year	Brijesh Shandllya (for the song "Banno")	Nominated	
Mirchi Music Awards	29 February 2016	Upcoming Music Composers of the Year	Tanishk–Vayu (for the song "Banno")	Nominated	
Producers Guild Film Awards	22 December 2015	Best Music Director	Krsna Solo	Nominated	
Producers Guild Film Awards	22 December 2015	Best Male Playback Singer	Brijesh Shandllya (for the song "Banno")	Nominated	
Producers Guild Film Awards	22 December 2015	Best Female Playback Singer	Swati Sharma (for the song "Banno")	Nominated	
Producers Guild Film Awards	22 December 2015	Best Female Playback Singer	Jyoti Nooran (for the song "Ghani Bawri")	Nominated	
Stardust Awards	21 December 2015	Best Music Album	—	Nominated	
Stardust Awards	21 December 2015	Best Lyricist	Raj Shekhar (for the song "Ghani Bawri")	Nominated	
Stardust Awards	21 December 2015	Best Playback Singer – Female	Jyoti Nooran (for the song "Ghani Bawri")	Nominated	
Zee Cine Awards	20 February 2016	Best Playback Singer – Female	Swati Sharma (for the song "Banno")	Nominated	
