= List of accolades received by Tanu Weds Manu Returns =

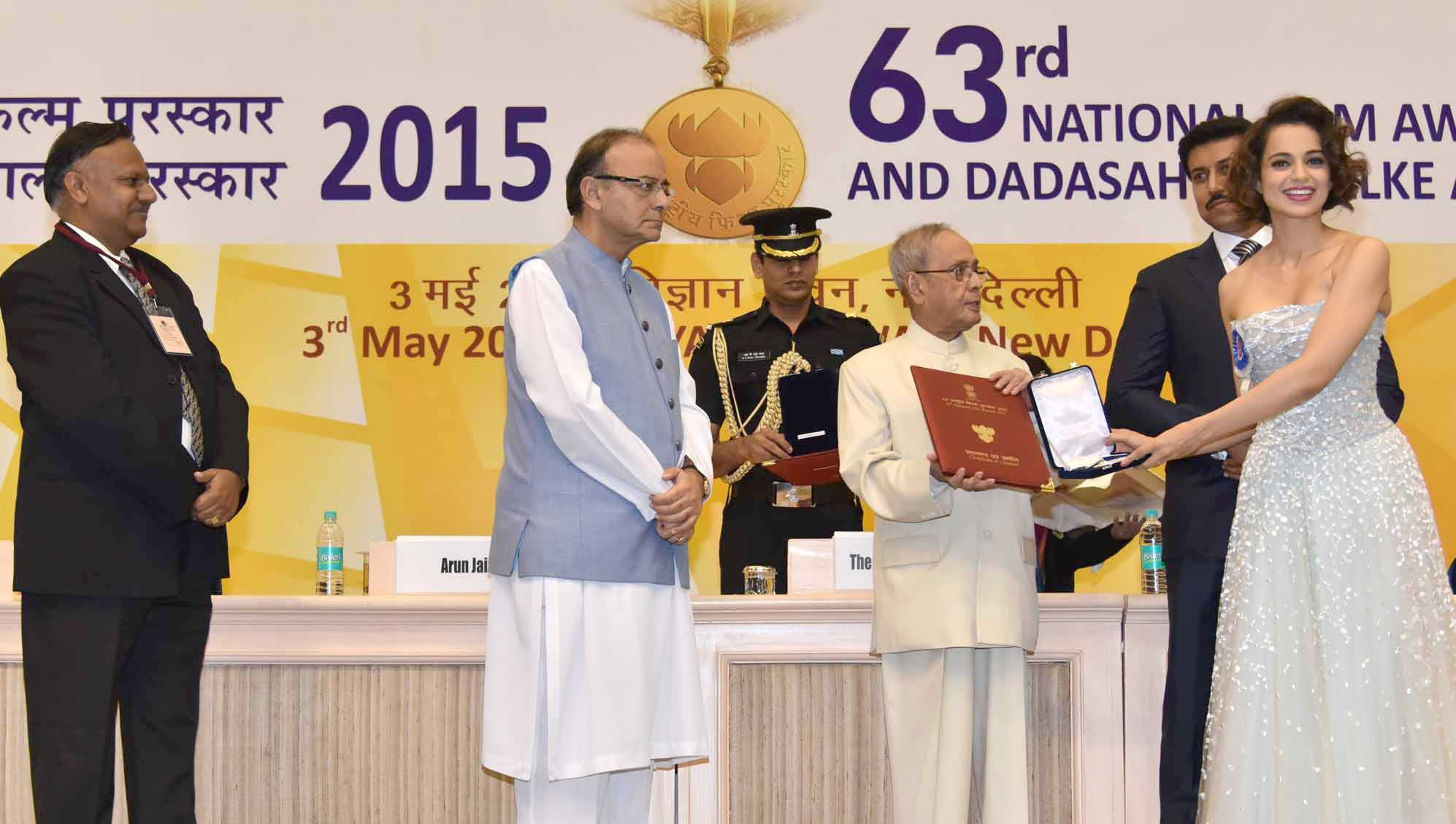
Ranaut's performance in Tanu Weds Manu: Returns garnered her several awards and nominations including the National Film Award for Best Actress at the 63rd National Film Awards.

Tanu Weds Manu: Returns is a 2015 Indian romantic comedy film directed by Aanand L. Rai and produced by Sunil Lulla and Krishika Lulla. A sequel to the 2011 film Tanu Weds Manu, the film stars R. Madhavan and Kangana Ranaut in lead roles. Jimmy Sheirgill, Swara Bhaskar and Deepak Dobriyal portray supporting roles. The film was written by Himanshu Sharma and the musical score was composed by Krsna Solo and Tanishk–Vayu. Tanu Weds Manu Returns tells the story of a feuding couple (Ranaut and Madhavan) who suffer from a series of misadventures when the husband is attracted to a younger, aspiring athlete (also Ranaut).

Made on a budget of ₹390 million (US$4.5 million), Tanu Weds Manu Returns was released on 22 May 2015, and grossed ₹2.43 billion (US$28 million) worldwide. The film garnered awards and nominations in several categories, with particular praise for its writing, music, and the performances of Ranaut and Dobriyal. As of June 2016, the film has won 15 awards.

At the 63rd National Film Awards, Tanu Weds Manu Returns won the awards for Best Actress (Ranaut), Best Original Screenplay and Best Dialogues. At the 61st Filmfare Awards ceremony, the film won two awards: Best Actress – Critics (Ranaut) and Best Dialogue. The film also received nominations for Best Film and Best Director at the ceremony. In addition, Tanu Weds Manu Returns received 13 nominations at the Producers Guild Film Awards ceremony, more than any other film, and won the award for Best Actor in a Comic Role (Dobriyal). Among other wins, the film garnered two awards each from the International Indian Film Academy, BIG Star Entertainment and the Times of India award ceremonies.

== Accolades ==
Award	Date of ceremony (Note: Date is linked to the article about the awards held that year, wherever possible.)	Category	Recipient(s) and nominee(s)	Result	Ref.
BIG Star Entertainment Awards	13 December 2015	Most Entertaining Comedy Film	Tanu Weds Manu: Returns	Won	
BIG Star Entertainment Awards	13 December 2015	Most Entertaining Actor in a Comedy Role – Male	Deepak Dobriyal	Won	
BIG Star Entertainment Awards	13 December 2015	Most Entertaining Romantic Film	Tanu Weds Manu: Returns	Nominated	
BIG Star Entertainment Awards	13 December 2015	Most Entertaining Actor in a Drama Role – Female	Kangana Ranaut	Nominated	
BIG Star Entertainment Awards	13 December 2015	Most Entertaining Actor in a Romantic Role – Male	R. Madhavan	Nominated	
BIG Star Entertainment Awards	13 December 2015	Most Entertaining Actor in a Romantic Role – Female	Kangana Ranaut	Nominated	
BIG Star Entertainment Awards	13 December 2015	Most Entertaining Music	Krsna Solo	Nominated	
BIG Star Entertainment Awards	13 December 2015	Most Entertaining Singer – Female	Swati Sharma (for song "Banno")	Nominated	
BIG Star Entertainment Awards	13 December 2015	Most Entertaining Song	Tanishk–Vayu (for song "Banno")	Nominated	
Filmfare Awards	15 January 2016	Best Film	Tanu Weds Manu: Returns	Nominated	
Filmfare Awards	15 January 2016	Best Director	Aanand L. Rai	Nominated	
Filmfare Awards	15 January 2016	Best Actress	Kangana Ranaut	Nominated	
Filmfare Awards	15 January 2016	Best Supporting Actor	Jimmy Sheirgill	Nominated	
Filmfare Awards	15 January 2016	Best Supporting Actor	Deepak Dobriyal	Nominated	
Filmfare Awards	15 January 2016	Best Dialogue	Himanshu Sharma	Won	
Filmfare Awards	15 January 2016	Best Actress – Critics	Kangana Ranaut	Won	
Global Indian Music Academy Awards	6 April 2016	Best Music Debut	Swati Sharma (for song "Banno")	Nominated	
Global Indian Music Academy Awards	6 April 2016	Best Music Debut	Tanishk–Vayu (for song "Banno")	Nominated	
Global Indian Music Academy Awards	6 April 2016	Best Playback Singer – Critics	Jyoti Nooran (for song "Banno")	Nominated	
Global Indian Music Academy Awards	6 April 2016	Best Duo/Group Song	Swati Sharma and Brijesh Shandllya (for song "Banno")	Won	
International Indian Film Academy Awards	25 June 2016	Best Movie	Tanu Weds Manu: Returns	Nominated	
International Indian Film Academy Awards	25 June 2016	Best Director	Aanand L. Rai	Nominated	
International Indian Film Academy Awards	25 June 2016	Best Actress	Kangana Ranaut	Nominated	
International Indian Film Academy Awards	25 June 2016	Best Supporting Actor	Deepak Dobriyal	Nominated	
International Indian Film Academy Awards	25 June 2016	Best Performance in a Comic Role	Deepak Dobriyal	Won	
International Indian Film Academy Awards	25 June 2016	Best Make Up	Vikram Gaikwad	Won	
Mirchi Music Awards	29 February 2016	Female Vocalist of the Year	Swati Sharma (for song "Banno")	Nominated	
Mirchi Music Awards	29 February 2016	Upcoming Female Vocalist of the Year	Swati Sharma (for song "Banno")	Nominated	
Mirchi Music Awards	29 February 2016	Upcoming Lyricist of the Year	Vayu (for song "Banno")	Nominated	
Mirchi Music Awards	29 February 2016	Upcoming Male Vocalist of the Year	Brijesh Shandllya (for song "Banno")	Nominated	
Mirchi Music Awards	29 February 2016	Upcoming Music Composers of the Year	Tanishk–Vayu (for song "Banno")	Nominated	
National Film Awards	3 May 2016	Best Actress	Kangana Ranaut	Won	
National Film Awards	3 May 2016	Best Original Screenplay	Himanshu Sharma (Note: Shared with Juhi Chaturvedi for Piku (2015).)	Won	
National Film Awards	3 May 2016	Best Dialogues	Himanshu Sharma	Won	
Producers Guild Film Awards	22 December 2015	Best Film	Tanu Weds Manu: Returns	Nominated	
Producers Guild Film Awards	22 December 2015	Best Director	Aanand L. Rai	Nominated	
Producers Guild Film Awards	22 December 2015	Best Actress in a Leading Role	Kangana Ranaut	Nominated	
Producers Guild Film Awards	22 December 2015	Best Actor in a Supporting Role	Deepak Dobriyal	Nominated	
Producers Guild Film Awards	22 December 2015	Best Actor in a Comic Role	Deepak Dobriyal	Won	
Producers Guild Film Awards	22 December 2015	Best Story	Himanshu Sharma	Nominated	
Producers Guild Film Awards	22 December 2015	Best Screenplay	Himanshu Sharma	Nominated	
Producers Guild Film Awards	22 December 2015	Best Dialogue	Himanshu Sharma	Nominated	
Producers Guild Film Awards	22 December 2015	Best Lyrics	Vayu (for song "Banno")	Nominated	
Producers Guild Film Awards	22 December 2015	Best Music Director	Krsna Solo	Nominated	
Producers Guild Film Awards	22 December 2015	Male Playback Singer	Brijesh Shandllya (for song "Banno")	Nominated	
Producers Guild Film Awards	22 December 2015	Female Playback Singer	Swati Sharma (for song "Banno")	Nominated	
Producers Guild Film Awards	22 December 2015	Male Playback Singer	Jyoti Nooran (for song "Ghani Bawri")	Nominated	
Screen Awards	8 January 2016	Best Supporting Actor	Deepak Dobriyal	Won	
Stardust Awards	21 December 2015	Film of the Year	Tanu Weds Manu: Returns	Nominated	
Stardust Awards	21 December 2015	Director of the Year	Aanand L. Rai	Nominated	
Stardust Awards	21 December 2015	Actor of the Year – Female	Kangana Ranaut	Nominated	
Stardust Awards	21 December 2015	Best Supporting Actor	Deepak Dobriyal	Nominated	
Stardust Awards	21 December 2015	Best Actor in a Comic Role	Deepak Dobriyal	Nominated	
Stardust Awards	21 December 2015	Best Music Album	Eros Music and T-Series	Nominated	
Stardust Awards	21 December 2015	Best Lyricist	Raj Shekhar (for song "Ghani Bawri")	Nominated	
Stardust Awards	21 December 2015	Best Playback Singer – Female	Jyoti Nooran (for song "Ghani Bawri")	Nominated	
Times of India Film Awards	18 March 2016	Best Film	Tanu Weds Manu: Returns	Nominated	
Times of India Film Awards	18 March 2016	Best Director	Aanand L. Rai	Nominated	
Times of India Film Awards	18 March 2016	Best Actor – Female	Kangana Ranaut	Won	
Times of India Film Awards	18 March 2016	Best Supporting Actor – Male	Deepak Dobriyal	Nominated	
Times of India Film Awards	18 March 2016	Best Actor in a Comic Role	Deepak Dobriyal	Won	
Times of India Film Awards	18 March 2016	Critics Award for Best Actor – Female	Kangana Ranaut	Nominated	
Zee Cine Awards	20 February 2016	Best Film	Tanu Weds Manu: Returns	Nominated	
Zee Cine Awards	20 February 2016	Critics Award for Best Film	Tanu Weds Manu: Returns	Nominated	
Zee Cine Awards	20 February 2016	Best Actor – Female	Kangana Ranaut	Nominated	
Zee Cine Awards	20 February 2016	Critics Award for Best Actor – Female	Kangana Ranaut	Nominated	
Zee Cine Awards	20 February 2016	Best Actor in a Supporting Role – Male	Deepak Dobriyal	Nominated	
Zee Cine Awards	20 February 2016	Best Playback Singer – Female	Swati Sharma (for song "Banno")	Nominated	

== See also ==
- List of Bollywood films of 2015
