= Tanu Weds Manu (soundtrack) =

Soundtrack album by Krsna Solo
- Released: 4 February 2011
- Recorded: 2010
- Genre: Feature film soundtrack
- Length: 34:53
- Language: Hindi
- Label: T-Series
- Producer: Krsna Solo

Krsna Solo chronology
Tanu Weds Manu (2011)	Jolly LLB (2013)

Tanu Weds Manu is the soundtrack album composed by Krsna Solo in his film debut as a music director. The 2011 romantic comedy film directed by Aanand L. Rai starred R. Madhavan and Kangana Ranaut. The album consisted of seven tracks with lyrics written by Raj Shekhar. It was released under the T-Series label on 4 February 2011, to positive reviews and Krsna won the Filmfare RD Burman Award for New Music Talent.

== Development ==
Tanu Weds Manu is Krsna's debut as a music composer; Krsna trained under the tutelage of Ustad Mehboob Khan Mirajkar learning Hindustani classical music and also learnt western music for over three years. When he was interested to compose for films, he came in contact with several people within the film industry, during which he met Raj Shekhar, who was hired as the lyricist. Through Shekhar, Krsna met Rai, who asked to compose tune which he did it the same night. Impressed by it, Krsna was brought onboard for the film. Krsna composed the music that the film demanded, instead of adapting it to the market demands.

== Critical reception ==
Joginder Tuteja of Bollywood Hungama described "Sadi Gali" and "Jugni" as the pillars of the album, that not "just add value to the album but also help the film gain added visibility" and further added "Mannu Bhaiyya" and "Piya" "add further variety to the album". Karthik Srinivasan of Milliblog wrote "Krsna's debut isn't ideally one with fresh tunes, but even within familiar templates, his songs are immensely engaging".

Sukanya Verma of Rediff.com called it as an "effervescent score ranging from thumping bhangra to rousing Sufi." Monica Chopra of Sify described the music "exemplary". Nikhat Kazmi of The Times of India wrote Krsna's music "captures mofussil India with all its bustling beauty". Anupama Chopra of NDTV, "Music plays an important role in a wedding-based romantic comedy and the director could have got it right if he had opted for fast-paced peppy numbers."

== Track listing ==
All lyrics are written by Raj Shekhar; all music is composed by Krsna Solo, except where noted.

No.	Title	Singer(s)	Length
1.	"Sadi Gali" (Music: RDB)	Lehmber Hussainpuri	4:24
2.	"Yun Hi"	Mohit Chauhan, Ujjaini Mukherjee	4:19
3.	"Rangrez"	Krsna Solo	5:29
4.	"Piya"	Roop Kumar Rathod	6:25
5.	"Mannu Bhaiya"	Sunidhi Chauhan, Ujjaini Mukherjee, Niladri Kumar	4:50
6.	"Jugni"	Mika Singh	3:11
7.	"Rangrez"	Wadali Brothers	6:12
Total length:			34:53

== Accolades ==
Award (Note: Awards, festivals and organizations are in Alphabetical order.)	Date of ceremony (Note: Date is linked to the article about the awards held that year, wherever possible.)	Category	Recipient(s)	Result	Ref.
Filmfare Awards	29 January 2012	R. D. Burman Award	Krsna Solo	Won	
Global Indian Music Academy Awards	30 October 2011	GiMA Award for Best Music Debut	Krsna Solo ("Rangrez")	Nominated	
Global Indian Music Academy Awards	30 October 2011	GiMA Award for Best Music Debut	Lehmber Hussainpuri ("Sadi Gali")	Nominated	
Mirchi Music Awards	21 March 2012	Upcoming Female Vocalist of The Year	Ujjaini Mukherjee (for "Manu Bhaiya")	Nominated	
Mirchi Music Awards	21 March 2012	Upcoming Music Composer of The Year	Krsna Solo (for "Jugni")	Nominated	
Mirchi Music Awards	21 March 2012	Song representing Sufi tradition	"Rangrez"	Nominated	
Screen Awards	14 January 2012	Best Music Director	Krsna Solo	Nominated	
