= Colour Yellow Productions =

Indian film studio

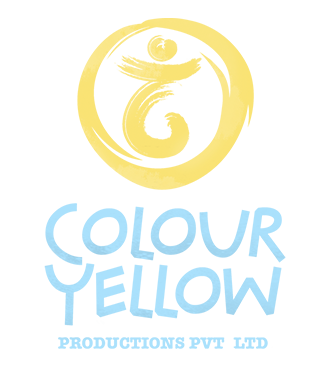
- Type: Private
- Industry: Motion picture
- Founded: 2011
- Founder: Aanand L Rai
- Headquarters: Mumbai, India
- Key people: Aanand L. Rai; Himanshu Sharma
- Products: Film production
- Website: colouryellow.com

Colour Yellow Productions is an Indian motion picture production company founded by filmmaker and film producer Aanand L. Rai.

== History ==
Colour Yellow Productions was founded in 2011 by Aanand L. Rai. The company has produced successful films that include the Tanu Weds Manu franchise (2011, 2015), the Happy Bhag Jayegi franchise (2016, 2018), Raanjhanaa (2013), Nil Battey Sannata (2016), Manmarziyaan (2018), Tumbbad (2018), Zero (2018), Laal Kaptaan (2019), Shubh Mangal Zyada Saavdhan (2020) and Haseen Dillruba (2021), Atrangi Re (2022).

== Filmography ==
Key
†	Denotes films that have not yet been released

Year	Film	Director	Producer	Notes
2011	Tanu Weds Manu	Aanand L. Rai	Vinod Bachan	
2013	Raanjhanaa	Aanand L. Rai	Krishika Lulla, Aanand L. Rai	
2015	Tanu Weds Manu Returns	Aanand L. Rai	Krishika Lulla, Aanand L. Rai	
2016	Nil Battey Sannata	Ashwiny Iyer Tiwari	Aanand L. Rai, Ajay G Rai, Alan Mcalex	
2016	Happy Bhag Jayegi	Mudassar Aziz	Krishika Lulla, Aanand L. Rai	
2017	Shubh Mangal Saavdhan	R. S. Prasanna	Krishika Lulla, Aanand L. Rai	
2017	Newton	Amit V. Masurkar	Manish Mundra	
2018	Mukkabaaz	Anurag Kashyap	Aanand L. Rai, Anurag Kashyap	
2018	Meri Nimmo	Rahul Ganore Shanklya	Aanand L. Rai	
2018	Happy Phirr Bhag Jayegi	Mudassar Aziz	Krishika Lulla, Aanand L. Rai	
2018	Manmarziyaan	Anurag Kashyap	Aanand L. Rai, Anurag Kashyap	
2018	Tumbbad	Rahi Anil Barve, Adesh Prasad	Sohum Shah, Aanand L. Rai, Mukesh Shah, Amita Shah	
2018	Moothon	Geetu Mohandas	Aanand L. Rai, Anurag Kashyap	
2018	Zero	Aanand L. Rai	Gauri Khan, Aanand L. Rai	
2019	Laal Kaptaan	Navdeep Singh	Aanand L. Rai, Sunil Lulla	
2020	Shubh Mangal Zyada Savdhan	Hitesh Kewalya	Aanand L. Rai, Himanshu Sharma, Bhushan Kumar, Krishan Kumar	
2021	Haseen Dillruba	Vinil Mathew	Aanand L. Rai, Himanshu Sharma	Netflix release
2021	Atrangi Re	Aanand L. Rai	Aanand L. Rai, Cape of Good Films, Bhushan Kumar	Disney Plus Hotstar release
2022	Good Luck Jerry	Sidharth Sengupta	Subaskaran Allirajah, Aanand L. Rai	Disney Plus Hotstar release
2022	Raksha Bandhan	Aanand L. Rai	Aanand L. Rai, Alka Hiranandani, Cape of Good Films	
2022	An Action Hero	Anirudh Iyer	Aanand L. Rai, Bhushan Kumar, Krishan Kumar	
2023	Jhimma 2	Hemant Dhome	Jyoti Deshpande, Kshitee Jog, Aanand L. Rai	Marathi film
2024	Phir Aayi Hasseen Dillruba	Jayprad Desai	Aanand L. Rai, Himanshu Sharma, Bhushan Kumar, Krishan Kumar	Netflix release
2025	Fussclass Dabhade	Hemant Dhome	Aanand L. Rai, Himanshu Sharma, Bhushan Kumar, Krishan Kumar	Marathi film
2025	Tere Ishk Mein	Aanand L. Rai	Aanand L. Rai, Himanshu Sharma, Bhushan Kumar, Krishan Kumar	
2026	Tu Yaa Main	Bejoy Nambiar	Aanand L. Rai, Himanshu Sharma, Vinod Bhanushali, Kamlesh Bhanushali	
2026	Nayyi Navelli	Balaji Mohan	Aanand L. Rai, Himanshu Sharma, Amazon MGM Studios	
2026	Nakhrewaalii	Rahul Shanklya	Aanand L. Rai, Himanshu Sharma, Jyoti Deshpande	
2027	Chauhaan †	Neeraj Yadav	Aanand L. Rai, Himanshu Sharma, Jyoti Deshpande	

== Awards ==
Year	Film	Award	Category
2014	Raanjhanaa	Star Guild Awards	Best Dialogue
2014	Raanjhanaa	Zee Cine Awards	Best Dialogue
2016	Tanu Weds Manu: Returns	Filmfare Awards	Best Dialogue
2016	Tanu Weds Manu: Returns	TOIFA Awards	Best Dialogue
2016	Tanu Weds Manu: Returns	National Film Awards	Best Story
2016	Tanu Weds Manu: Returns	National Film Awards	Best Dialogue
2019	Tumbbad	Filmfare Awards	Best Cinematography
2019	Tumbbad	Filmfare Awards	Best Production Design
2019	Tumbbad	Filmfare Awards	Best Sound Design
2019	Tumbbad	IIFA Awards	Best Sound Design
2019	Tumbbad	IIFA Awards	Best Special Effects
2019	Tumbbad	Screen Awards	Best Cinematography
