= Raj Shekhar =

Indian lyricist

- Occupation: Lyricist
- Years active: 2009–present

Raj Shekhar is an Indian lyricist who works in Hindi films. He made his debut as a lyricist with the 2011 film Tanu Weds Manu. He went on to write the lyrics for other notable films including Tanu Weds Manu Returns, Tumbbad, Veere Di Wedding, Hichki and Uri: The Surgical Strike.

== Career ==
He started his career as an assistant director to Aanand L. Rai. He made his debut as a lyricist for the film Tanu Weds Manu, directed by Rai starring R. Madhavan and Kangana Ranaut. He assisted Abbas Tyrewala in Jaane Tu... Ya Jaane Na and Sujoy Ghosh in Home Delivery.

== Filmography ==
=== As lyricist ===
Year	Film	Title	Composer	Notes
2011	Tanu Weds Manu	''Mannu Bhaiya''	Krsna Solo	
2011	Tanu Weds Manu	''Jugni''	Krsna Solo	
2011	Tanu Weds Manu	''Yun Hi''	Krsna Solo	
2011	Tanu Weds Manu	''Piya''	Krsna Solo	
2011	Tanu Weds Manu	''Rangrez''	Krsna Solo	
2011	Tanu Weds Manu	''Rangrez (Wadali Bros)''	Krsna Solo	
2013	Issaq	''Enne Unne''	Sachin-Jigar	
2015	Tanu Weds Manu Returns	''Ho Gaya Hai Pyaar''	Krnsa Solo	
2015	Tanu Weds Manu Returns	''Move On''	Krnsa Solo	
2015	Tanu Weds Manu Returns	''Old School Girl''	Krnsa Solo	
2015	Tanu Weds Manu Returns	''O Saathi Mere''	Krnsa Solo	
2015	Tanu Weds Manu Returns	''Mat Ja Re''	Krnsa Solo	
2015	Tanu Weds Manu Returns	''Ghani Bawari''	Krnsa Solo	
2016	Cute Kameena	''Single Chal Reya Hun''	Krnsa Solo	
2016	Cute Kameena	''Yeh Sheher Mehboob Hai Ji''	Krnsa Solo	
2016	Cute Kameena	''Da Di Dada''	Krnsa Solo	
2016	Cute Kameena	''Shaam Hote Hi''	Krnsa Solo	
2016	Cute Kameena	''Rafa Dafa''	Krnsa Solo	
2017	Friendship Unlimited	''Tere Bin O Yara''	Vishal Mishra	Marathi film
2017	Qarib Qarib Singlle	''Khatam Kahani''	Vishal Mishra	
2017	Qarib Qarib Singlle	''Jaane De''	Vishal Mishra	
2018	Veere Di Wedding	''Suicide Kargi Re''	Shashwat Sachdev	
2018	Tumbbad	''Tumbbad Anthem''	Ajay-Atul	
2018	Hichki	''Madamji Go Easy''	Jasleen Royal	
2018	Hichki	''Khol De Par''	Jasleen Royal	
2018	Meri Nimmo	''Bulbula''	Krsna Solo	
2018	Meri Nimmo	''Tumse Hi''	Mangesh Dhadke	
2018	Meri Nimmo	''Ye Bhi Beet Jayega''	Krsna Solo	
2019	Uri: The Surgical Strike	''Beh Chala''	Shashwat Sachdev	
2019	Jabariya Jodi	''Ki Honda Pyaar (Male version)''	Vishal Mishra	
2019	Jabariya Jodi	''Ki Honda Pyaar (Female version)''	Vishal Mishra	
2019	Jabariya Jodi	''Macchardani''	Vishal Mishra	
2019	Saand Ki Aankh	''Udta Teetar''	Vishal Mishra	
2019	Saand Ki Aankh	''Womaniya''	Vishal Mishra	
2019	Saand Ki Aankh	''Aasmaa''	Vishal Mishra	
2019	Saand Ki Aankh	''Baby Gold''	Vishal Mishra	
2019	Saand Ki Aankh	''Jhunna Jhunna''	Vishal Mishra	
2019	Saand Ki Aankh	''Womaniya (Raw version)''	Vishal Mishra	
2019	Saand Ki Aankh	''Aasmaa (Film version)''	Vishal Mishra	
2019	Saand Ki Aankh	''Aasmaa''	Vishal Mishra	
2020	Bamfaad	''Bamfaad (Title Track)''	Vishal Mishra	
2020	Bamfaad	''Ishq Ka Itar''	Vishal Mishra	
2020	Bamfaad	''Munasib''	Vishal Mishra	
2020	Bamfaad	''Yaar Mera Ho Mere Rubaru''	Vishal Mishra	
2020	Khaali Peeli	''Duniya Sharma Jaayegi''	Vishal–Shekhar	Co-written with Kumaar
2020	Khaali Peeli	''Shana Dil''	Vishal–Shekhar	
2020	Mismatched	''Aise Kyun''	Anurag Saikia	
2020	Raat Akeli Hai	''Aadhe Aadhe Se''	Sneha Khanwalkar	
2020	Meenakshi Sundareshwar	''Mann Kesar Kesar''	Justin Prabhakaran	
2020	Meenakshi Sundareshwar	''Titar Bitar''	Justin Prabhakaran	
2020	Meenakshi Sundareshwar	''Vaada Machaney''	Justin Prabhakaran	
2020	Meenakshi Sundareshwar	''Tu Yahin Hai''	Justin Prabhakaran	
2020	Meenakshi Sundareshwar	''Ratti Ratti Reza Reza''	Justin Prabhakaran	
2021	Kathmandu Connection	Syahi Syahi	Sneha Khanwalkar	Web series
2022	Ittu Si Baat	''Gulaabi''	Vishal Mishra	
2022	Ittu Si Baat	''Sun Bhi Le''	Vishal Mishra	
2022	Ittu Si Baat	''Dar Badar''	Vishal Mishra	
2022	Ittu Si Baat	''Middle Class''	Vishal Mishra	
2022	Ittu Si Baat	''17 Lakh Da Gajra''	Vishal Mishra	
2022	Doctor G	''O Sweety Sweety''	Amit Trivedi	
2022	Mismatched Season 2	''Aise Kyun (Gazal Version)''	Anurag Saikia, Raj Shekhar	
2022	Good Luck Jerry	''Mor Mor''	Parag Chhabra	
2022	Good Luck Jerry	''Paracetamol''	Parag Chhabra	
2022	Good Luck Jerry	''Jogan''	Parag Chhabra	
2022	Good Luck Jerry	''Jhand Ba (Sad)''	Parag Chhabra	
2022	Good Luck Jerry	''Jhand Ba''	Parag Chhabra	
2022	Good Luck Jerry	''Cutie Cutie''	Parag Chhabra	
2022	Nazar Andaaz	''Sukoon (Male version)''	Vishal Mishra	
2022	Nazar Andaaz	''Sukoon (Female version)''	Vishal Mishra	
2022	Nazar Andaaz	''Lootre Aagye''	Vishal Mishra	
2022	Nazar Andaaz	''Andekhe Rang''	Vishal Mishra	
2022	Nazar Andaaz	''Aadhi Kahaani''	Vishal Mishra	
2022	Nazar Andaaz	''Jadoo''	Vishal Mishra	
2022	Rocketry : The Nambi Effect	''Behne Do''	Sam C. S.	
2023	Animal	''Papa Meri Jaan (Childs's version)''	Harshvardhan Rameshwar	
2023	Animal	''Papa Meri Jaan''	Harshvardhan Rameshwar	
2023	Animal	''Pehle Bhi Main''	Vishal Mishra	
2023	Pachuvum Athbutha Vilakkum	''Thinkal Poovin''	Justin Prabhakaran	
2023	Pachuvum Athbutha Vilakkum	''Chalte Raho''	Justin Prabhakaran	
2023	Akelli	''Umeedon Ki Titliyaan''	Hitesh Sonik	
2024	Bhakshak	''Ganga''	Anurag Saikia, Anuj Garg	
2024	Bhakshak	''Shaamil Hain''	Anurag Saikia, Anuj Garg	
2024	Crew	''Kiddan Zalima''	Vishal Mishra	
2024	Savi	''Humdum''	Vishal Mishra	
2024	Mismatched 3	''Ishq Hai''	Anurag Saikia, Raj Shekhar	
2024	Mismatched 3	''Sab Thik Hai''	Anurag Saikia, Raj Shekhar	
2024	Phir Aayi Haseen Dilruba	''Haste Haste''	Sachet-Parampara	
2025	Deva	''Bhasad Macha''	Vishal Mishra	
2025	Deva	''Bas Tera Pyaar Hai''	Vishal Mishra	
2025	Deva	''Bas Tera Pyaar Hai (Palak Version)''	Vishal Mishra	
2025	Saiyaara	"Tum Ho Toh"	Vishal Mishra	
2025	Hridayapoorvam	"Tuk Tuk Tuk Tu"	Justin Prabhakaran	Malayalam film
2026	Toxic	"Tabaahi"	Vishal Mishra	

== Discography ==
=== Singles ===
Year	Song	Singer
2021	''Sheher''	Anurag Saikia, Raj Shekhar
2022	''Boli Tujhse''	Amit Trivedi
2022	''Hairaan"	Javed Ali
2023	''Baarish Hai Janam"	Payal Dev
