= Stardust Award for Best Director of the Year =

Film award in India

The Stardust Dream Director Award is chosen by a distinguished jury as part of the annual Stardust Awards.

Karan Johar holds this record by winning 3 awards, followed by Ashutosh Gowariker and Farah Khan with 2 awards.

== Multiple wins ==
Wins	Recipient
3	Karan Johar
2	Ashutosh Gowariker, Farah Khan

== List of winners ==
Year	Director	Film
2003	Vikram Bhatt	Raaz
2005	Ashutosh Gowariker	Swades
2006	Sanjay Leela Bhansali	Black
2007	Rajkumar Hirani	Lage Raho Munna Bhai
2008	Farah Khan	Om Shanti Om
2009	Ashutosh Gowariker	Jodhaa Akbar
2010	Imtiaz Ali	Love Aaj Kal
2011	Karan Johar	My Name Is Khan
2012	Rohit Shetty	Singham
2013	Karan Johar	Student Of The Year
2014	Farah Khan	Happy New Year
2015	Kabir Khan and Anand L. Rai	Bajrangi Bhaijaan and Tanu Weds Manu Returns
2016	Karan Johar	Ae Dil Hai Mushkil

== See also ==
- Stardust Awards
- Bollywood
- Cinema of India
