= Vayu Shrivastav =

Indian singer and songwriter

Vayu
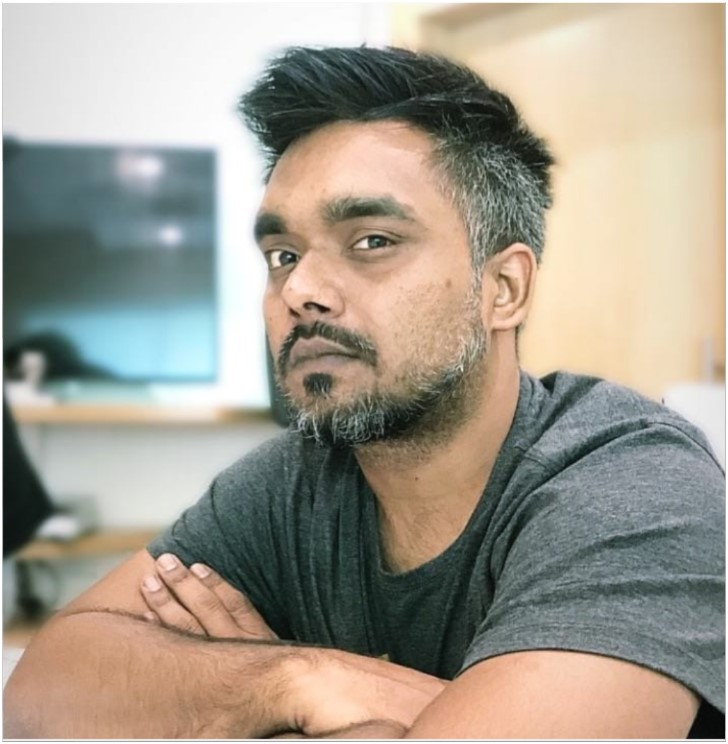
- Vayu in 2018
- Born: Madhya Pradesh, India
- Occupations: Lyricist, Singer, Music Composer
- Years active: 2009–present

Vaibhav Shrivastava, more popularly known as Vayu, is an Indian singer and songwriter, who has been active in the industry for over 10 years. He signed on to Sony Music India as an exclusive artist in 2018.

== Early life ==
Vayu was born in Madhya Pradesh and spent his childhood years in small towns like Singrauli and Rewa. His mother used to affectionately call him Vayu, and the nickname stuck. His parents moved to Bhopal after he finished his schooling.

Vayu moved to Indore to study Graphic Designing and later shifted to Pune to pursue Masters in Mass Communication from Symbiosis Institute of Mass Communication (SIMC).

== Career ==
Vayu moved to Mumbai in 2009 and worked in advertising by writing for various mediums like print and TV. He finally got his first lyricist break by Ram Gopal Verma in the 2010 movie, Rann. With Oopar Oopar Renn De (Bro Anthem) in 2014 and Banno from Tanu Weds Manu Returns in 2015, he established his credentials as a quirky and hit lyricist, and found a name in the industry. Initially, Vayu started out in Bollywood with his friend Tanishk Bagchi, but the two have now gone separate solo ways, occasionally collaborating on a song or two.

Vayu wrote the lyrics for Arjun Kanungo's single Gallan Tipsiyaan and Akasa's single "Thug Ranjha".

Vayu has written and co-composed Sanedo from Mitron, 2018 (starring Jackky Bhagnani and Kritika Kamra). He has written the lyrics for Chad Gayi Hai and Monobina from the Akshay Kumar movie, Gold.

He has also written the lyrics for 3 songs (Milegi Milegi, Kamariya, Nazar Na Lag Jaaye) in the latest hit movie Stree, starring Rajkummar Rao and Shraddha Kapoor with Pankaj Tripathi, Aparshakti Khurrana, and Abhishek Banerjee appearing in supporting roles.

Badhaaiyan Tenu is a track written by Vayu, for the upcoming comedy drama film Badhaai Ho directed by Amit Ravindernath Sharma.

Vayu wrote the Pepsi Anthem Swag Se Solo and also composed it along with Tanishk Bagchi.

He is a composer, lyricist and singer of a song under label of Sony Music India named as Baatein Karo. It was released in March 2020. Shot in India and Sri Lanka. The song is a soulful track on smartphone life consuming the importance of in person talks.

== Discography ==
Vayu has contributed to several Bollywood movies as lyricist and performer. Following is his discography.

Year of Release	Song name	Movie	Role	Composer(s)
2010	Sikkon Ki Andhi Bhook Hai	Rann	Lyricist	
2010	Karma Dharma	Rakht Charitra	Lyricist	
2010	Mila To Marega	Rakht Charitra	Lyricist	
2011	Jab Se Mein Choti Thi	Not A Love Story	Lyricist	
2011	Rangeela Re	Not A Love Story	Lyricist	
2011	Woh Ek Pal	Not A Love Story	Lyricist	
2012	Kammo	Department	Lyricist	
2012	Mumbai Police	Department	Lyricist	
2012	Bad Boys	Department	Lyricist	
2013	Jhooth Boliya	Jolly LLB	Lyricist	Krsna Solo
2015	Banno Tera Swagger	Tanu Weds Manu Returns	Lyricist, Composer	Tanishk-Vayu
2016	Beat Pe Booty	A Flying Jatt	Lyricist, Singer	Sachin-Jigar
2016	Khair Mangda	A Flying Jatt	Lyricist	Sachin-Jigar
2017	Kankad	Shubh Mangal Savdhan	Lyricist, Composer	Tanishk-Vayu
2017	Kanha	Shubh Mangal Savdhan	Lyricist, Composer	Tanishk-Vayu
2017	Kanha (Male)	Shubh Mangal Savdhan	Lyricist, Composer	Tanishk-Vayu
2017	Laddoo	Shubh Mangal Savdhan	Lyricist, Composer	Tanishk-Vayu
2017	Rocket Saiyyan	Shubh Mangal Savdhan	Lyricist, Composer	Tanishk-Vayu
2017	Beat It Bijuriya	Munna Michael	Lyricist, Composer	Tanishk-Vayu
2017	Twist Kamariya	Bareilly Ki Barfi	Lyricist, Composer	Tanishk-Vayu
2017	Balma Yegh Karma	Brij Mohan Amar Rahe	Lyricist, Composer	Tanishk-Vayu
2017	Disco Disco	A Gentleman	Lyricist	Sachin-Jigar
2017	Chandralekha	A Gentleman	Lyricist	Sachin-Jigar
2017	Bandook Meri Laila	A Gentleman	Lyricist	Sachin-Jigar
2017	Lagdi Hai Thaai	Simran	Lyricist	Sachin-Jigar
2017	Majaa Ni Life	Simran	Lyricist	Sachin-Jigar
2017	Single Rehne De	Simran	Lyricist	Sachin-Jigar
2017	Piya Aa	Haseena Parkar	Lyricist	Sachin-Jigar
2017	Jai Mata Di	Bhoomi	Lyricist (Along with Utkarsh Naithani)	Sachin-Jigar
2017	Manva Likes to Fly	Tumhari Sulu	Lyricist	Tanishk Bagchi
2017	Ye Waqt Maut Ka Hai	The House Next Door	Lyricist	
2018	Monobina	Gold	Lyricist	Tanishk Bagchi
2018	Chad Gayi Hai	Gold	Lyricist	Sachin-Jigar
2018	Milegi Milegi	Stree	Lyricist	Sachin-Jigar
2018	Kamariya	Stree	Lyricist	Sachin-Jigar
2018	Nazar Na Lag Jaye	Stree	Lyricist	Sachin-Jigar
2018	Dil Ka Darzi	Stree	Lyricist, Singer	Sachin-Jigar
2018	Sanedo	Mitron	Lyricist, Composer	Tanishk-Vayu
2018	Ice Cream	Lust Stories	Lyricist, Composer	Tanishk-Vayu
2018	Beat Junglee	Dil Juunglee	Lyricist	Tanishk Bagchi
2018	Badhaai Ho - Title Track	Badhaai Ho	Lyricist	Tanishk Bagchi
2018	Sajan Bade Senti	Badhaai Ho	Lyricist	JAM8
2018	Shubh Din	Parmanu: The Story of Pokhran	Lyricist	Sachin-Jigar
2018	Thare Vaaste	Parmanu: The Story of Pokhran	Lyricist	Sachin-Jigar
2018	Kasumbi	Parmanu: The Story of Pokhran	Lyricist	Sachin-Jigar
2019	The Naari Naari Song	Made in China	Lyricist	Sachin-Jigar
2019	Zumba	Good Newwz	Lyricist	Tanishk Bagchi
2019	Mumbai Dilli Di Kudiyaan	Student of the Year 2	Lyricist	Vishal-Shekhar
2019	The Bhoot Song	Housefull 4	Lyricist (Along with Farhad Samji)	Farhad Samji, Sandeep Shirodkar
2020	Mile Sur	Street Dancer 3D	Lyricist, Singer	Sachin-Jigar
2020	Start Stop	Laxmii	Lyricist, Composer	Tanishk-Vayu
2020	Raakh	Shubh Mangal Zyada Saavdhan	Lyricist, Composer	Tanishk-Vayu
2020	Aisi Taisi	Shubh Mangal Zyada Saavdhan	Lyricist, Composer	Tanishk-Vayu
2020	Pyaar Kar Le	Shubh Mangal Zyada Saavdhan	Lyricist Along with Ikka, Sameer	Tanishk Bagchi
2020	Gabru	Shubh Mangal Zyada Saavdhan	Lyricist	Tanishk Bagchi
2020	Kaafi	Shubh Mangal Zyada Saavdhan	Lyricist	Tanishk Bagchi
2020	Kya Karte	Shubh Mangal Zyada Saavdhan	Lyricist	Tanishk Bagchi
2020	Pass Nahi	Shakuntala Devi	Lyricist	Sachin-Jigar
2020	Rani Hindustani	Shakuntala Devi	Lyricist	Sachin-Jigar
2021	Kheench Te Naach	Chandigarh Kare Aashiqui	Lyricist	Sachin-Jigar
2021	Chandigarh Kare Aashiqui 2.0	Chandigarh Kare Aashiqui	Lyricist	Tanishk Bagchi
2021	Zaalima Coca-Cola	Bhuj: The Pride of India	Lyricist	Tanishk Bagchi
2021	One Two Dance	Hello Charlie	Lyricist	Tanishk Bagchi
2021	Doli	Helmet	Composer, Lyricist	Tanishk-Vayu
2021	Raja Boy	Velle	Lyricist, Singer	Rochak Kohli
2021	Yaaron Ka Bhulava	Velle	Lyricist	Rochak Kohli
2022	Badhaai Do - Title Track	Badhaai Do	Lyricist	Tanishk Bagchi
2022	Firecracker	Jayeshbhai Jordaar	Lyricist (Along with Kumaar)	Vishal-Shekhar
2022	Firecracker (English)	Jayeshbhai Jordaar	Lyricist (Along with Kumaar and Vishal Dadlani)	Vishal-Shekhar
2022	Bijli	Govinda Naam Mera	Lyricist	Sachin-Jigar
2023	Shaadi Dope Hai	Aankh Micholi	Lyricist	Sachin-Jigar
2023	Cocktail	Jogira Sara Ra Ra	Lyricist	Tanishk Bagchi
2023	Le Aaunga	Satyaprem Ki Katha	Lyricist	Tanishk Bagchi
2024	"Chumma"	Vicky Vidya Ka Woh Wala Video	Lyricist	Sachin–Jigar
2025	"So Lene De"	Ground Zero	Lyricist	Tanishk Bagchi
2025	"Ek Chatur Naar - Title Track"	Ek Chatur Naar	Lyricist, Composer	Vayu-Sharan Rawat
2026	"Vyah Karwado Ji"	Hai Jawani Toh Ishq Hona Hai	Lyricist	White Noice Collectives
2026	"Tera Ho Jaun"	Hai Jawani Toh Ishq Hona Hai	Lyricist	White Noice Collectives

== Singles ==
Year of Release	Song name	Album	Role
2017	Gallan Tipsiyaan	Single by Arjun Kanungo	Lyricist
2018	Thug Ranjha	Single by Akasa	Lyricist
2020	Baatein Karo	Single By Vayu	Composer, Lyricist, Singer, Performer
2021	Tohfa	Single By Vayu	Lyricist, Singer

== Awards and nominations ==
Year	Award Ceremony	Category	Film	Song	Result	Reference(s)
2015	Mirchi Music Awards	Upcoming Music Composer of The Year	Tanu Weds Manu: Returns	"Banno"	Nominated	
2015	Mirchi Music Awards	Upcoming Lyricist of The Year	Tanu Weds Manu: Returns	"Banno"	Nominated	
