= Swati Sharma =

Indian singer

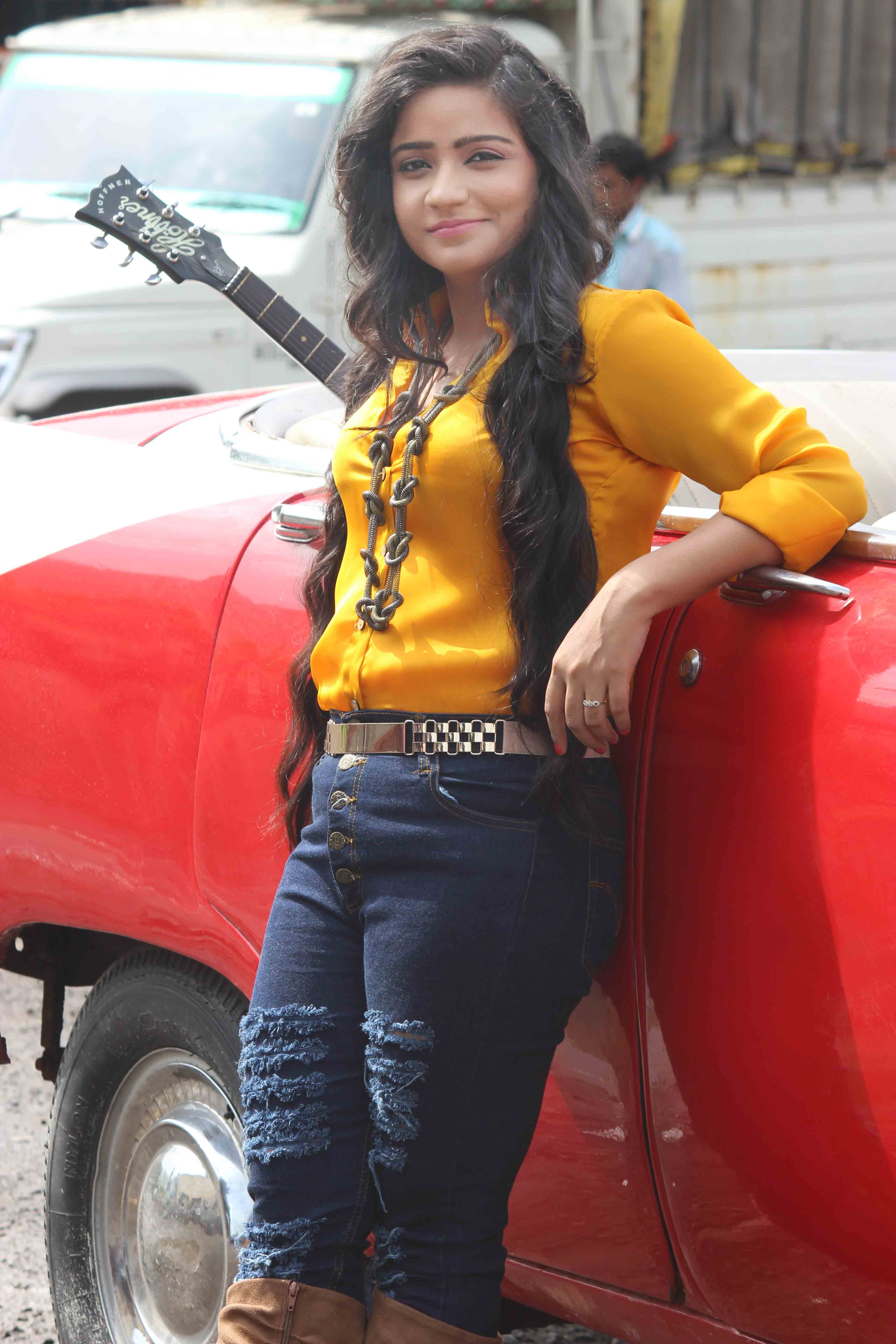

Background information
- Born: Swati Sharma; 4 October 1994 (age 32); Muzaffarpur, Bihar, India
- Occupation: Playback singer
- Instruments: vocals, guitar
- Years active: 2014-present

Swati Sharma is an Indian singer. She is known for her popular song "Banno Tera Swagger" from Tanu Weds Manu: Return, a film directed by Anand L. Rai. She is also notable for producing music that has been used in Bollywood films. In 2017 she became the first Indian singer to perform at the Eiffel Tower (Paris).

== Biography ==
Sharma was born in Muzaffarpur, Bihar, in northeast India. Her father worked in marketing, while her mother was a homemaker. Sharma's family traces its origin to Sikar in Rajasthan, and this Rajasthani heritage which would inspire some of her later work in the music industry. She started singing at the age of seven, after which her family encouraged her to pursue a career in the music industry; her relatives would also jokingly compare her to Sunidhi Chauhan, a prominent playback singer.

With her father's support, Sharma began her education in music at Pankaj Maharaj, a musical school in Kolkata, before going on to take a music course at Chandigarh University, an institution long associated with Indian music. During this time she also worked as a playback singer, with most of her early work being dubbed over by other musicians or actresses. After she performed a number of devotional hymns before a live audience in Lucknow, she received enough positive feedback to being producing devotional albums.

After finishing her studies, Sharma moved to Mumbai to continue her career in music. She networked extensively, using Facebook to contact musicians for advice and to advocate for her ability to sing. In 2015 she was contacted by Tanishk Bagchi (of the group Tanishk-Vayu), a film score composer who worked extensively in the Bollywood film industry. He commissioned Sharma to sing a romantic song for an upcoming film. The song, Banno tera Swagger, was recorded and later dubbed over by Indian actress Kangana Ranaut in the 2015 romantic comedy film Tanu Weds Manu: Returns. The film was a critical and financial success, and Sharma's role in producing a hit song for Tanu's score led to a dramatic uptick in her popularity.

Sharma has continued to record albums and done more playback work. She won a number of music awards in 2016.

In 2017 she became the first Indian singer to perform at the Eiffel Tower.

== Discography ==
Year	Film	Song(s)
2015	Tanu Weds Manu Returns	"Banno"
2015	Yudh Astitvachi Ladai	"Chal Door Door"
2016	Direct Ishq	"Duaon Mein Yaad Rakhna", "Nimboo sa Ishq", "Toote Tarey", "Direct Ishq Title Track", "Ganga Maiya", "Mera Hissa"
2016	Ek Tera Saath	"Pakeeja", "Saiyaan", "Humsafar", "Ek Tera Sath Title track"
2016	Tutak Tutak Tutiya	"Rail Gaddi"
2016	Saansein	"Mera Ishq"
2016	Flame	"Tera Ishq"
2016	Freaky Ali	"Din Mein Karenge Jagrata"
2017	Jeena Isi Ka Naam Hai	"Sochti Hoon"
2017	Anaarkali of Aarah	"Doonaliya", "Mora Piya"
2017	Shaadi Mubarak Ho (Serial)	"Maujoodgi", "Madhaniya"
2017	Tera Intezaar	"Sexy Barbie Girl"
2018	Kaashi in Search of Ganga	"Bam Bam Bole Kaashi"
2018	Majha Baikocha Priyakar	"Tu Haath Nako Lawu"
2019	X Ray: The Inner Image	"Jiglia", "Higher"
2021	Litti Chokha	"Muhalla Machis Ho Gaya" (with Khesari Lal Yadav)
2022	Jugjugg Jeeyo	"Tum Jo Gaye (Female)"
2024	Guntur Kaaram (Hindi)	"Dum Masala" (with Lk Laxmikant and Stuti Sinha), "Oh My Baby"
2026	Zabt (Pakistani Drama)	"Zabt OST" (with Wajhi Farooki)

== Awards ==
Awards	Year	Song	Movie	Won/Nomination
Zee Cine awards	2016	"Banno"	Tanu Weds Manu Returns	Nominated
Star Screen Awards	2016	"Banno"	Tanu Weds Manu Returns	Nominated
Sony Guild Awards	2016	"Banno"	Tanu Weds Manu Returns	Nominated
GIMA Awards	2016	"Banno"	Tanu Weds Manu Returns	Won
Mirchi Music awards	2016	"Banno"	Tanu Weds Manu Returns	Nominated
Big Star Entertainment Award	2016	"Banno"	Tanu Weds Manu Returns	Nominated
Lion Gold Awards	2016	"Banno"	Tanu Weds Manu Returns	Won
Radio Mirchi Disc Awards	2016	"Banno"	Tanu Weds Manu Returns	Won
