= Strangers (2007 Hindi film) =

- Theatrical release poster
- Directed by: Aanand L. Rai
- Written by: Himanshu Sharma; Gaurav Sinha
- Screenplay by: Gaurav Sinha
- Produced by: Raj Kundra
- Starring: Jimmy Sheirgill; Kay Kay Menon; Nandana Sen; Sonali Kulkarni
- Cinematography: Manoj Gupta
- Edited by: Sanjay Sankla
- Music by: Sachin Gupta
- Release date: 14 December 2007
- Running time: 100 minutes
- Country: India
- Language: Hindi

Strangers is a 2007 Indian Hindi-language thriller film directed by Aanand L. Rai starring Jimmy Sheirgill, Kay Kay Menon, Nandana Sen, and Sonali Kulkarni. It is an adaptation of the 1951 Alfred Hitchcock film Strangers on a Train, which was based on the 1950 novel Strangers on a Train by Patricia Highsmith.

== Synopsis ==
Rahul, a writer, and Sanjeev Rai, a management professional giant, are travelling in a business-class compartment of a train in England from Southampton to London. The claustrophobia of closed space and the fact that they both are Indians, bind them, and they start chatting. The chatting gets more and more personal, and they both learn that they are not happy with their married lives. Rai is living a miserable life. After his son's death, his wife Nandini is in a state of madness. Likewise, Rahul is not respected by his wife Preity after the crash of his ambitious career as a writer. Rahul and Sanjeev Rai come to a mutual conclusion that the only way to get out of their painful lives is to kill each other's wives.

== Cast ==
- Jimmy Sheirgill as "Rahul"
- Kay Kay Menon as "Sanjeev Rai"
- Nandana Sen as "Preity", wife of Rahul
- Sonali Kulkarni as "Nandini Rai", wife of Sanjeev
- Kitu Gidwani as a publisher in a guest role
- Natalie Hatcher as Frances, Preity's friend
- Mark Von as Peter, Frances's husband

== Production ==
This is first film by Anand Rai as director. Earlier Anand Rai (younger brother of Ravi Rai) has worked as associate director for the 2000 Hindi film Anjaane directed by Ravi Rai.

== Soundtrack ==
No.	Title	Singer(s)	Length
1.	"Baat Kehne Ko"	Shreya Ghoshal, Sonu Nigam	6:24
2.	"Farishta Nahin Main"	Band Black	3:04
3.	"Farishta Nahin Main – Remix"	Band Black	3:46
4.	"Jaane Ke Kaisi Raahon Mein"	Lata Mangeshkar, Vinay Tiwari	5:55
5.	"Khwabon Ki Ek"	Vinay Tiwari	4:19
6.	"Main Tera Aks Hoon"	Vinay Tiwari	5:12
7.	"Strangers Yaad Aa Gayi"	Romy B	4:43
8.	"Sulgi Hui Saansein Meri"	Sunidhi Chauhan	7:17
9.	"Yaad Aaye Woh Din"	Band Nine	4:03

== Reception ==
Thani of Rediff.com gave the film three out of 5, writing, "Aanand Rai's Strangers surprises by achieving the rare feat of an Indian film's second half bettering, and even improving over the first half."
