= Tamanchey =

2014 Indian Hindi film

- Poster of film
- Directed by: Navneet Behal
- Produced by: Suryaveer Singh Bhullar
- Starring: Nikhil Dwivedi; Richa Chadda
- Cinematography: Dani Sanchez-Lopez
- Edited by: Manish Jaitly
- Music by: Krsna; R. D. Burman; Ikka; Intense; Arko; (background music) Pritesh Mehta; Luv o'trigger (Rap Verses)
- Release date: 10 October 2014
- Running time: 113 minutes
- Country: India
- Language: Hindi

Tamanchey (transl. Guns) is an Indian Hindi-language romantic crime comedy film released on 10 October 2014. The film is directed by Navneet Behal and stars Nikhil Dwivedi and Richa Chadda in the lead roles.

== Plot ==
The story begins with the escape of Munna (Dwivedi), a criminal from Uttar Pradesh, who becomes smitten with Bindiya (Chadda), a bold and street-smart woman from Delhi. Bindiya is initially portrayed as hard-as-nails and the mistress of a powerful mafia kingpin named Rana (Damandeep Singh). Munna and Bindiya are inexplicably drawn to one another, starting an on-the-run romance that unfolds amidst their criminal activities. The couple becomes involved in drug peddling on the India-Nepal border, operating with the assistance of corrupt police officials. Their romance is constantly played out against the threat of law enforcement and their connection to Rana, the mafia boss. The film is essentially a quirky, opposites-attract love story where the protagonists are "un-reformable" individuals. The narrative focuses on their intense, volatile relationship and their efforts to survive while being pursued by the law and the underworld. The film concludes with a smile on the faces of the two main characters, suggesting a favorable, albeit non-traditional, end for the criminal lovers.

== Cast ==
- Nikhil Dwivedi as Munna
- Richa Chadda as Bindiya a.k.a. Babu
- Damandeep Singh as Rana

== Production ==
The film started shooting in early 2014 and shot most parts in New Delhi. Richa Chadda slapped Nikhil Dwiwedi 16 times for a scene.

== Promotions ==
Actor Salman Khan promoted this film stating that Khan liked the film. Khan also launched the film song "In Da Club"

== Soundtrack ==
Tamanchey

Soundtrack album by Krsna, R. D. Burman, Ikka, Intense and Arko
- Genre: Feature film soundtrack
- Length: 43:39
- Label: Zee Music Company

Track listing
No.	Title	Lyrics	Music	Singer(s)	Length
1.	"Pyar Mein Dil Pe Maar De Goli"	Anjaan, Puneet Sharma	R. D. Burman, Krsna	Bappi Lahiri, Kishore Kumar, Asha Bhosle, Luv O Trigger	4:41
2.	"Pyar Mein Dil Pe Maar De Goli" (Munna & Babu Love Remix)	Anjaan, Puneet Sharma	R. D. Burman, Krsna	Bappi Lahiri, Kishore Kumar, Luv O Trigger and Asha Bhosle	4:20
3.	"Pyar Mein Dil Pe Maar De Goli" (Disco Remix)	Anjaan, Puneet Sharma	R. D. Burman, Krsna	Bappi Lahiri, Kishore Kumar, Luv O Trigger and Asha Bhosle	4:08
4.	"In Da Club"	Ikka Singh	Ikka Singh, Intense	Ikka Singh	3:15
5.	"Dildara"	Arko	Arko	Sonu Nigam	4:36
6.	"Dildara" (Reprise)	Arko	Arko	Arko	4:36
7.	"Khamakha Hi Tumase Paala"	Krsna	Krsna	Mohit Chauhan	4:19
8.	"Khamakha Hi Tumase Bhid Gaye"	Krsna	Krsna	Krsna	4:12
9.	"Khamakha" (Reprise)	Krsna	Krsna	Krsna	4:27
10.	"Dildara" (Female Reprise)	Arko	Arko	Asees Kaur	5:05
Total length:					43:39
