= Mirza Juuliet =

- Directed by: Rajesh Ram Singh
- Written by: Shanti Bhushan
- Based on: Mirza Sahiban
- Produced by: Neeraj Kumar Burman; Ketan Maru; Amit Singh
- Starring: Darshan Kumar; Pia Bajpai
- Cinematography: Ajay Pandey
- Edited by: Sahil Sai
- Music by: Songs; Krsna Solo; Background music Hitesh Sonik
- Production companies: Shemaroo Entertainment; Green Apple Media
- Release date: 7 April 2017
- Running time: 130 minutes
- Country: India
- Language: Hindi
- Box office: ₹9.5 million

Mirza Juuliet is a 2017 Indian Hindi-language romantic drama film, directed by Rajesh Ram Singh and produced by Green Apple Media in association with Falansha Media Private Limited and Shemaroo Entertainment. It is a modern-era retelling of the Mirza Sahiban folk story from Punjab. The film was released on 7 April 2017.

== Cast ==
- Darshan Kumar as Mirza
- Pia Bajpai as Juliet
- Chandan Roy Sanyal as Rajan
- Priyanshu Chatterjee as Dharamraj (a.k.a., Dharmaraj Shukla)
- Hemant Kumar as Bheem
- Swanand Kirkire as Veer Pandey
- Yogendra Vikram Singh as Nakul
- Rashid Siddiqui as Jailor Pathak

== Soundtrack ==
Mirza Juuliet

Soundtrack album by Krsna Solo & DJ Notorious
- Released: 14 March 2017
- Genre: Feature film soundtrack
- Length: 22:46
- Label: Zee Music Company
External audio
- Audio Jukebox on YouTube

The soundtrack of Mirza Juuliet contains five songs composed by Krsna Solo with lyrics written by Sandeep Nath.

Track listing
| No. | Title | Singer(s) | Length |
|---|---|---|---|
| 1. | "Tukda Tukda" | Asees Kaur | 4:33 |
| 2. | "Muhabbat Ko Misuse" | Krsna Solo | 3:48 |
| 3. | "Seene Mein Lagi Aag" | Javed Bashir | 4:41 |
| 4. | "Teri Razamandi" | Javed Ali | 5:53 |
| 5. | "Muhabbat Ko Misuse (Remix)" | Krsna Solo | 3:51 |
| Total length: | | | 22:46 |

== Marketing ==
The movie poster was launched on 28 February 2017 and the trailer on 7 March 2017. The first song, "Tukda Tukda" was released on 16 March 2017.

== Critical reception ==
Reza Noorani of The Times of India gave the film a rating of 2 out of 5 and said that, "In an effort to capture the magic of the tragic love story it is inspired from, 'Mirza Juuliet' crumbles under its own ambition and becomes a cinematic tragedy instead." Saibal Chatterjee of NDTV gave the film a rating of 1 out of 5 and said that, "Mirza Juuliet is a crass, clammy and clichéd concoction that is best avoided. The single star isn't for the film. It's for Darshan Kumaar." Shubhra Gupta of The Indian Express gave the film a rating of 1/2 star out of 5 stars and said that, "This film comes stuffed with the most abominable clichés which are clearly aligned to the power structures in place. This is not a film, it is a travesty." Stutee Ghost of The Quint gave the film a rating of 1 out of 5 under the headline, "This One's So Bad, It's Truly a Tragedy".
