= Thodi Life Thoda Magic =

- Directed by: Aanand L. Rai
- Produced by: Saahil Chhada; Fizz Entertainment
- Starring: Jackie Shroff; Arbaaz Khan; Anita Raj
- Cinematography: Amitabha Singh; Raju Kaygee
- Edited by: Ballu Saluja
- Music by: Vinay Tiwari
- Release date: 27 June 2008
- Country: India
- Language: Hindi

Thodi Life Thoda Magic is a 2008 Indian Hindi-language film directed by Aanand L. Rai. The film stars Jackie Shroff, Parmeet Sethi, Paresh Rawal, Arbaaz Khan and Anita Raj in pivotal roles. Cricket commentator Harsha Bhogle also plays a guest role. The film's music is by Vinay Tiwari.

== Cast ==
- Jackie Shroff as MK
- Parmeet Sethi as Aditya Singhania
- Anita Raj as Ashima Singhania, Aditya's wife
- Harsha Bhogle as himself (Special Appearance)
- Arbaaz Khan as Roshan Merchant
- Meera Vasudevan as Naina Jairaj
- Saahil Chadha as Siddharth ("Sid")

== Soundtrack ==
The music was composed by Vinay Tiwari and released by T-Series.

Thodi Life Thoda Magic

Soundtrack album by Vinay Tiwari
- Released: 2008
- Recorded: 2008
- Genre: Soundtrack
- Length: 46:06
- Label: T-Series
- Producer: Vinay Tiwari

Track list
No.	Title	Lyrics	Singer(s)	Length
1.	"Tune Kahi Aur Maine Maani"	Irshad Kamil	Kailash Kher	6:36
2.	"Thoda Sa Gum Ho Thodi Khushi Ho"	Sunil Jogi	Sonu Nigam	6:50
3.	"Thoda Sa Gum Ho Thodi Khushi Ho (Sad)"	Sunil Jogi	Sonu Nigam	9:26
4.	"Yeh Mast Hawa Jo"	Irshad Kamil	Sonu Nigam, Shreya Ghoshal, Vinay Tiwari	7:08
5.	"Zindagi Zindagi Kaisi Hai Tu"	Aanand L. Rai	Suhaas, Saahil	1:18
6.	"Thoda Sa Gum Ho Thodi Khushi Ho (Remix)"	Sunil Jogi	Sonu Nigam	4:03
7.	"Tune Kahi Aur Maine Maani (Remix)"	Irshad Kamil	Kailash Kher	4:16
8.	"Maana Yeh Aaj Hamne"	Irshad Kamil	Shaan, Vijay, Swati	6:29
Total length:				46:06
