= GiMA Award for Best Music Debut =

Indian music award

The GiMA Best Music Debut is given by Global Indian Music Academy as a part of its annual Global Indian Music Academy Awards.

== List of winners ==
- 2010 Swanand Kirkire for "Behti Hawa Sa Tha Woh" – 3 Idiots (as lyricist)
  - Alyssa Mendonsa for "Uff Teri Adaa" - Karthik Calling Karthik (as singer)
- 2011 Mamta Sharma for "Munni Badnaam Hui" – Dabangg (as singer)
  - Bhadwai Village Mandal for "Mehngayi Dayain" - Peepli Live (as composer)
  - Krsna for "Rangrez" - Tanu Weds Manu (as music director)
  - Lehmber Hussainpuri for "Sadi Gali" - Tanu Weds Manu (as singer)
  - Sanjay Leela Bhansali for "Guzaarish" - Guzaarish (as composer)
- 2012 Kamal Khan for "Ishq Sufiyana" – The Dirty Picture (as singer)
  - Ayushmann Khurrana for "Pani Da Rang" - Vicky Donor (as singer)
  - Ayushmann Khurrana, Rochak Kohli for "Pani Da Rang" - Vicky Donor (as music composer and lyricist)
  - Harshit Saxena for "Hale Dil" - Murder 2 (as music composer)
  - Sunil Bhatia for "Chu Chu Acoustic" - Saheb Biwi Aur Gangster (as music composer)
- 2014 Ankit Tiwari for "Sunn Raha Hai" – Aashiqui 2 (as music composer and singer)
  - Nirali Kartik for " Torey Matwaare Naina" - David (as singer)
  - Mili Nair for "Meethi Boliyaan" - Kai Po Che! (as singer)
  - Osman Mir for "Mor Bani Thanghat" - Goliyon Ki Raasleela Ram-Leela (as singer)
  - Smita Nair Jain for "Issaq Tera" - Issaq (as singer)
- 2015 Armaan Malik for "Auliya" – Ungli (as a singer) and Sultana and Jyoti Nooran for "Pataka Guddi" – Highway (as a singer)
  - Kanika Kapoor for "Baby Doll" – Ragini MMS 2 (as singer)
  - Mukhtiyar Ali for "Fanny Re" – Finding Fanny (as singer)
  - Shraddha Kapoor for "Galliyan" – Ek Villain (as singer)
  - Sultana & Jyoti Nooran for "Pataka Guddi" - Highway (as singer)
- 2016 Ami Mishra for "Hasi" – Hamari Adhuri Kahani (as music composer)
  - Anupam Roy for "Piku" – Piku (as music composer)
  - Neeraj Rajawat "Maati Ka Palang" – NH10 (as lyricist)
  - Swati Sharma for "Banno" – Tanu Weds Manu Returns (as singer)
  - Tanishk-Vayu for "Banno" - Tanu Weds Manu Returns (as music composer)

== See also ==
- Bollywood
- Cinema of India
