= Filmfare R. D. Burman Award =

Annual award for Hindi films

The Filmfare R. D. Burman Award is given by the Filmfare magazine as part of its annual Filmfare Awards for Hindi films. Named in honour of music director R. D. Burman, the award recognises new and upcoming talent in the Bollywood music industry. The first award in this category was given in 1995.

== Winners ==
Table key
Symbol	Meaning
‡	Indicates that the winner won the award for performances in multiple films

Year	Image	Recipient	Film	Ref.
1995 (40th)	A. R. Rahman at a press conference for the film Highway	A. R. Rahman	Roja	
1996 (41st)	—	Mehboob Kotwal	Rangeela	
1997 (42nd)	Vishal Bhardwaj at an event in 2017	Vishal Bhardwaj	Maachis	
1998 (43rd)	—	Karthik Raja	Grahan	
1999 (44th)	Photograph of Kamaal Khan	Kamaal Khan	Pyaar Kiya To Darna Kya	
2000 (45th)	Ismail Darbar at the Vestoria Fashion Show	Ismail Darbar	Hum Dil De Chuke Sanam	
2001 (46th)	Sunidhi Chauhan at Kailasa Studio	Sunidhi Chauhan	Mast	
2002 (47th)	Shankar Mahadevan, Ehsaan Noorani and Loy Mendonsa at a Raymond Weil store launch in Mumbai	Shankar–Ehsaan–Loy	Dil Chahta Hai	
2003 (48th)	Shreya Ghoshal at a recording studio	Shreya Ghoshal	Devdas	
2004 (49th)	Vishal Dadlani and Shekhar Ravjiani at a concert	Vishal–Shekhar	Jhankaar Beats	
2005 (50th)	Kunal Ganjawala at GiMA's tribute to Jagjit Singh	Kunal Ganjawala	Murder	
2006 (51st)	Shantanu Moitra at the audio release of Peepli Live	Shantanu Moitra	Parineeta	
2007 (52nd)		Naresh Iyer	Rang De Basanti	
2008 (53rd)		Monty Sharma	Saawariya	
2009 (54th) ‡		Benny Dayal	• Ghajini • Jaane Tu... Ya Jaane Na • Yuvvraaj	
2010 (55th)		Amit Trivedi	Dev.D	
2011 (56th)	—	Sneha Khanwalkar	Love Sex Aur Dhokha	
2012 (57th)		Krsna Solo	Tanu Weds Manu	
2013 (58th)		Neeti Mohan	Jab Tak Hai Jaan	
2014 (59th)		Siddharth Mahadevan	Bhaag Milkha Bhaag	
2016 (61st)		Armaan Malik	Hero	
2017 (62nd)		Amit Mishra	Ae Dil Hai Mushkil	
2019 (64th)		Niladri Kumar	Laila Majnu	
2020 (65th)		Shashwat Sachdev	Uri: The Surgical Strike	
2023 (68th)	—	Janhvi Shrimankar	Gangubai Kathiawadi	
2024 (69th)	—	Shreyas Puranik	Animal	
2025 (70th)		Achint Thakkar	Jigra	

== See also ==
- Bollywood
- Filmi
