= Meri Nimmo =

- Poster
- Directed by: M.M Shanklya
- Written by: Peeyush Shrivastava
- Produced by: Aanand L. Rai; Himanshu Sharma
- Starring: Anjali Patil
- Cinematography: Sangram Giri
- Edited by: Ninad Khanolkar
- Music by: Krsna Solo; Mangesh Dhakde
- Production company: Colour Yellow Productions
- Distributed by: Eros International
- Release date: 27 April 2018
- Running time: 90 minutes
- Country: India
- Language: Hindi

Meri Nimmo (transl. My Nimmo) is a 2018 Indian drama film directed by Rahul Ganore Shanklya and produced by Aanand L. Rai. The film stars Anjali Patil as Nimmo, and Karan Dave as Hemu, an eight-year-old boy who falls in love with the 24-year-old Nimmo. It premiered at the 47th International Film Festival of India and the Mumbai Film Festival in 2017 where it earned critical praise. Meri Nimmo was released online digitally through Eros Now on 27 April 2018.

== Cast ==
- Anjali Patil as Nimmo
- Karan Dave as Hemu
- Shalini Pandey as Nimmo's friend
- Aryan Mishra as Matru
- Sunayana Agarwal as Hemu's mother
- Amar Singh Parihar as Dulha (Bridegroom)
- Sarika Nayak as Nimmo's Bua
- Vivek Pandey as Nimmo's father
- Rana Pratap Sengar as Shailu
- Anshul Thakur as Mahendra

== Soundtrack ==
Meri Nimmo

Soundtrack album by Krsna Solo & Mangesh Dhakde
- Released: 25 April 2018
- Genre: Feature film soundtrack
- Length: 10:59
- Language: Hindi / Braj Bhasha
- Label: Eros Music
External audio
- Audio Jukebox on YouTube

The soundtrack of Meri Nimmo consists of 3 songs composed by Krsna Solo and Mangesh Dhakde the lyrics of which have been written by Raj Shekhar.

Tracklist
No.	Title	Music	Singer(s)	Length
1.	"Bulbula"	Krsna Solo	Paroma Dasgupta	03:34
2.	"Yeh Bhi Beet Jayega"	Krsna Solo	Sukriti Kakkar	03:14
3.	"Tumse Hi"	Mangesh Dhakde	Javed Ali	04:11
Total length:				10:59

== Reception ==
Udita Jhunjhunwala of Firstpost called the film a "uncomplicated and sweet story" but felt the runtime was stretched. R. J. Alok gave a positive review and called the film "relatable". Nandini Ramnath of Scroll praised the performances of Anjali Patil and Karan Dave and said that, "Despite its narrative holes, the 90-minute film has been directed with confidence and has identifiable characters." Rahul Desai of Film Companion gave the film a rating of 3 out of 5 and said that, "It’s sweet, even when it gets repetitive (90 minutes does seem long here), because the makers don’t employ the usual crutches accompanying such themes". Mayank Shekhar of Mid-Day was impressed with the film and said that, "Meri Nimmo, produced by Aanand L Rai, is a rare Hindi film that tells you as much about childhood as life in a village."
