= Himanshu Sharma =

Indian film writer and producer (born 1981)

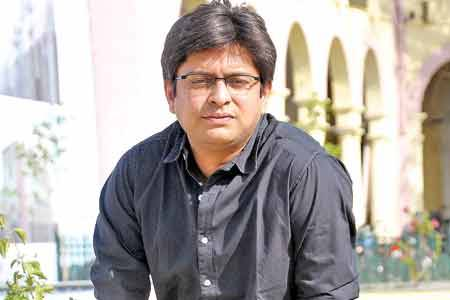
- Born: 20 August 1981 (age 45); Lucknow, Uttar Pradesh, India
- Education: Kirori Mal College
- Occupations: Film Writer and also Producer
- Years active: 2007–present
- Spouse: Kanika Dhillon (m. 2021)

Himanshu Sharma (born 20 August 1981) is an Indian film writer and producer who works in Hindi cinema. He is best known as the writer of the Tanu Weds Manu series (2011 and 2015), for which he received two National FIlm Awards, and Raanjhanaa (2013), all of which were considered highly successful domestically.

== Early life and education ==
Himanshu Sharma was born to Jiwan Sharma, a U.P. Tourism officer and Shama Sharma in Lucknow. Himanshu did his schooling from Spring dale College, Lucknow and later moved to Kirori Mal College, Delhi for higher education, where he started taking part in theatre.

== Personal life ==
Himanshu has one younger sister and a brother, and he was in a relationship with Bollywood actress Swara Bhaskar. In January 2021, Himanshu married Kanika Dhillon.

== Career ==
He started his career with NDTV as script writer for a health show. Subsequently, he moved to Mumbai to pursue his career in serials and movies. He wrote the script for many TV serials like Kkusum on Sony TV and Bhootwala on SAB TV. He made his film writing debut with the movie Strangers, with Nandana Sen and Jimmy Sheirgill, produced by Raj Kundra. He is a member of International Film And Television Club of AAFT. Himanshu Sharma is also part of Colour Yellow Productions, which co-produced Raanjhanaa and Tanu Weds Manu: Returns.

His other film credits as writer and producer include Atrangi Re and Raksha Bandhan.

== Filmography ==
=== As screenwriter ===
| Year | Name |
|---|---|
| 2007 | Strangers |
| 2011 | Tanu Weds Manu |
| 2013 | Raanjhanaa |
| 2015 | Tanu Weds Manu: Returns |
| 2018 | Zero |
| 2021 | Atrangi Re |
| 2022 | Raksha Bandhan |
| 2025 | Tere Ishk Mein |
| 2026 | Tu Yaa Main |

=== Creative producer ===
| Year | Name |
|---|---|
| 2016 | Happy Bhag Jayegi |
| 2016 | Nil Battey Sannata |

=== Producer ===
| Year | Name |
|---|---|
| 2017 | Shubh Mangal Savdhan |
| 2018 | Manmarziyaan |
| 2018 | Happy Phirr Bhag Jayegi |
| 2018 | Meri Nimmo |
| 2019 | Laal Kaptaan |
| 2020 | Shubh Mangal Zyada Saavdhan |
| 2021 | Haseen Dillruba |
| 2021 | Atrangi Re |
| 2021 | Good Luck Jerry |
| 2022 | Raksha Bandhan |
| 2025 | Tere Ishk Mein |
| 2026 | Tu Yaa Main |

== Awards and nominations ==
=== Nominations ===
- 2012 Best Dialogue: Star Screen awards for Tanu Weds Manu (2011)
- 2012 Best Dialogue: IIFA Singapore awards for Tanu Weds Manu (2011)
- 2012 Best Story: Filmfare awards for Tanu Weds Manu (2011)
- 2012 Best Story: Apsara awards for Tanu Weds Manu (2011)
- 2014 Best Story: Star guild award for Raanjhanaa (2013)
- 2014 Best Dialogue: Star guild award for Raanjhanaa (2013)
- 2014 Best Screenplay:Star guild award for Raanjhanaa (2013)
- 2014 Dialogue of the year : Star guild award for Raanjhanaa (2013)
- 2014 Best Story: Zee Cine award for Raanjhanaa (2013)
- 2014 Best Dialogue: Zee Cine award for Raanjhanaa (2013)
- 2014 Best Screenplay: Zee Cine award for Raanjhanaa (2013)
- 2016 Best Story: Star Screen award for Tanu Weds Manu: Returns (2016)
- 2016 Best Dialogue: Star Screen award for Tanu Weds Manu Returns (2016)
- 2016 Best Screenplay: Star Screen award for Tanu Weds Manu Returns (2016)
- 2016 Best Dialogue: TOIFA award for Tanu Weds Manu Returns (2016)
- 2016 Best Dialogue: National Film Awards for Tanu Weds Manu Returns (2016)
- 2016 Best Story: National Film Awards for Tanu Weds Manu Returns (2016)

=== Wins ===
- 2014 Best Dialogue: Star Guild award for Raanjhanaa (2013)
- 2014 Best Dialogue: Zee Cine award for Raanjhanaa (2013)
- 2016 Best Dialogue: Filmfare award for Tanu Weds Manu: Returns (2016)
- 2016 Best Dialogue: TOIFA award for Tanu Weds Manu Returns (2016)
- National Film Awards 2016

1. For Best Screenplay: Screenplay Writer (Original) - For Tanu Weds Manu Returns

2. For Best Screenplay: Dialogues - For Tanu Weds Manu Returns

== Filmography ==
- Himanshu Sharma at IMDb
