= Producers Guild Film Award for Best Music Director =

Annual Indian film award

- Awarded for: Best Music Director of the Year
- Country: India
- Presented by: Film & Television Producers Guild
- First award: 2004 (for films released around 2003)
- Currently held by: Amaal Mallik, Ankit Tiwari, Meet Bros Anjjan (2016)
- Website: Producers Guild Film Awards

The Producers Guild Film Awards for Best Music Director (previously known as the Apsara Award for Best Music Director) is given by the producers of the film and television guild as part of its annual award ceremony to recognise the best Indian film of the year. Following its inception in 2004, no one was awarded in 2005 and 2007.

== Superlatives ==
Superlatives	Best Music Director	
Most awards	Pritam	4
Most nominations	Pritam	14
Most nominations in a single year	Pritam (2008, 2010, 2011, 2012, 2013)	2
Most nominations in a single year	A. R. Rahman (2009, 2010)	2
Most nominations in a single year	Shankar–Ehsaan–Loy(2009)	2
Most consecutive awards	Pritam	(2013-2014)

== Winner and nominees ==
=== 2000s ===
- 2004 Shankar–Ehsaan–Loy - Kal Ho Naa Ho
  - Rajesh Roshan - Koi... Mil Gaya
  - Jatin–Lalit and Aadesh Shrivastava - Chalte Chalte
  - Uttam Singh - Pinjar
  - Himesh Reshammiya - Tere Naam
- 2005 - no award
- 2006 Shankar–Ehsaan–Loy - Bunty Aur Babli
  - Shantanu Moitra - Parineeta
  - Anu Malik - Murder
  - Late Madan Mohan - Veer-Zaara
  - Himesh Reshammiya - Aashiq Banaya Apne
- 2007 - no award
- 2008 Pritam - Jab We Met
  - A.R. Rahman - guru
  - Vishal–Shekhar - Om Shanti Om
  - Pritam - Life in a ... Metro
  - Monty Sharma - Saawariya
- 2009 A.R. Rahman - Jodhaa Akbar
  - Shankar–Ehsaan–Loy - Taare Zameen Par
  - Shankar–Ehsaan–Loy Rock On!!
  - A.R. Rahman Jaane Tu Ya Jaane Na
  - Pritam - Singh Is Kinng

=== 2010s ===
- 2010 Pritam - Love Aaj Kal
  - A. R. Rahman - Ghajini
  - Salim–Sulaiman - Rab Ne Bana Di Jodi
  - Pritam - Ajab Prem Ki Ghazab Kahani
  - A.R. Rahman - Delhi-6
- 2011 Sajid–Wajid - Dabangg
  - Vishal–Shekhar - I Hate Luv Storys
  - Pritam - Once Upon a Time in Mumbai
  - Pritam - Crook
  - Vishal Bhardwaj - Ishqiya
  - Shankar–Ehsaan–Loy - My Name Is Khan
- 2012 A.R. Rehman - Rockstar
  - Himesh Reshammiya & Pritam - Bodyguard
  - Pritam - Dum Maaro Dum
  - Sachin-Jigar - F.A.L.T.U
  - Sohail Sen - Mere Brother Ki Dulhan
  - Pritam - Ready
- 2013 Pritam - Cocktail
  - A.R. Rahman - Jab Tak Hai Jaan
  - Ajay–Atul - Agneepath
  - Pritam - Barfi!
  - Sneha Khanwalkar - Gangs of Wasseypur
- 2014 Pritam - Yeh Jawaani Hai Deewani
  - A.R. Rahman - Raanjhanaa
  - Sanjay Leela Bhansali - Goliyon Ki Raasleela Ram-Leela
  - Vishal–Shekhar - Chennai Express
  - Shankar–Ehsaan–Loy - Bhaag Milkha Bhaag
  - Mithoon - Tum Hi Ho
- 2015 Ankit Tiwari - Galliyan - Ek Villain
  - Amit Trivedi - London Thumakda - Queen
  - Himesh Reshammiya - Jumme Ki Raat - Kick
  - Yo Yo Honey Singh - Sunny Sunny - Yaariyan
  - Vishal Bhardwaj - Bismil - Haider
  - Meet Bros Anjjan - Baby Doll - Ragini MMS 2
  - A.R Rahman- Patakha Guddi - Highway
- 2016 Amaal Mallik, Ankit Tiwari, Meet Bros Anjjan - Roy
  - Jeet Ganguly and Mithoon - Hamari Adhuri Kahani
  - Anu Malik - Dum Laga Ke Haisha
  - Pritam - Bajrangi Bhaijaan
  - A.R Rahman - Tamasha
  - Krsna Solo - Tanu Weds Manu Returns
