= Tanishk-Vayu =

- Occupations: singer-songwriter; composer; Lyricist
- Years active: 2015–present
- Labels: T-Series; Sony Music India; Zee Music Company
- Members: Tanishk Bagchi; Vayu Shrivastav

Tanishk-Vayu is a duo of Indian composer Tanishk Bagchi and lyricist Vayu Shrivastav, who also act as a composer duo. They together composed for films like Tanu Weds Manu Returns (2015), Bareilly Ki Barfi (2017), Tumhari Sulu (2017), Shubh Mangal Saavdhan (2017), Munna Michael (2017), Gold (2018), Mitron (2018), Dil Juunglee (2018), Badhaai Ho( 2018), Shubh Mangal Zyada Saavdhan (2020), etc. The duo also composed the Pepsi Anthem of 2020 named Swag Se Solo.

== Discography ==
Year	Film	Track(s)	Singer(s)	Composer(s)	Writer(s)	Notes
2015	Tanu Weds Manu Returns	"Banno"	Brijesh Shandilya, Swati Sharma	Tanishk-Vayu	Vayu	As composer duo
2017	Bareilly Ki Barfi	"Twist Kamariya"	Harshdeep Kaur, Yasser Desai, Altamash Faridi, Tanishk Bagchi	Tanishk-Vayu	Tanishk-Vayu	As composer-lyricist duo
2017	Shubh Mangal Saavdhan	"Rocket Saiyan"	Ritu Pathak, Brijesh Shandilya, Tanishk Bagchi	Tanishk-Vayu	Tanishk-Vayu	As composer-lyricist duo
2017	Shubh Mangal Saavdhan	"Kanha"	Shashaa Tirupati	Tanishk-Vayu	Tanishk-Vayu	As composer-lyricist duo
2017	Shubh Mangal Saavdhan	"Kanha (Male)"	Ayushmann Khurrana	Tanishk-Vayu	Tanishk-Vayu	As composer-lyricist duo
2017	Shubh Mangal Saavdhan	"Laddoo"	Mika Singh	Tanishk-Vayu	Tanishk-Vayu	As composer-lyricist duo
2017	Shubh Mangal Saavdhan	"Kankad"	Shashaa Tirupati, Raja Hasan, Rajnigandha Shekhawat, Armaan Hasan	Tanishk-Vayu	Tanishk-Vayu	As composer-lyricist duo
2017	Munna Michael	"Beat It Bijuriya"	Asess Kaur, Renesa Bagchi	Tanishk-Vayu	Tanishk-Vayu	As composer-lyricist duo
2018	Dil Juunglee	"Beat Juunglee"	Armaan Malik, Prakriti Kakkar	Tanishk Bagchi	Tanishk-Vayu	As lyricist duo
2018	Mitron	"Sanedo"	Darshan Raval, Raja Hasan	Tanishk-Vayu	Vayu	As composer duo
2018	Brij Mohan Amar Rahe	"Balma Yeh Karma"	Brijesh Shandilya, Jyotica Tangri	Tanishk-Vayu	Vayu	As composer duo
2019	Maaserati(Non-film)	"Maaserati"	Tanishk Bagchi, Vayu, Akasa	Tanishk-Vayu	Tanishk-Vayu	As composer-lyricist duo
2020	Shubh Mangal Zyada Saavdhan	Mere Liye Tum Kaafi Hai	Ayushmann Khurrana	Tanishk-Vayu	Vayu	As composer duo
2020	Shubh Mangal Zyada Saavdhan	Aisi Taisi	Mika Singh	Tanishk-Vayu	Vayu	As composer duo
2020	Shubh Mangal Zyada Saavdhan	Raakh	Arijit Singh	Tanishk-Vayu	Vayu	As composer duo
2020	Mere Angne Mein(Non-film)	" Mere Angne Mein"	Neha Kakkar, Raja Hasan	Tanishk-Vayu	Tanishk-Vayu	As composer-lyricist duo
2020	Swag Se Solo(Non-film)	" Swag Se Solo"	Sachet Tandon, Tanishk Bagchi	Tanishk-Vayu	Tanishk-Vayu	As composer-lyricist duo
2021	Solo Laila(Non-film)	"Solo Laila"	Ipsitaa	Tanishk-Vayu	Tanishk-Vayu	As composer-lyricist duo
2021	Helmet	"Doli"	Brijesh Shandilya	Tanishk-Vayu	Vayu	As composer duo
2023	Satyaprem Ki Katha	"Le Aaunga"	Arijit Singh	Tanishk Bagchi	Tanishk-Vayu	As lyricist duo
