= Krsna Solo =

Indian music composer, singer, songwriter

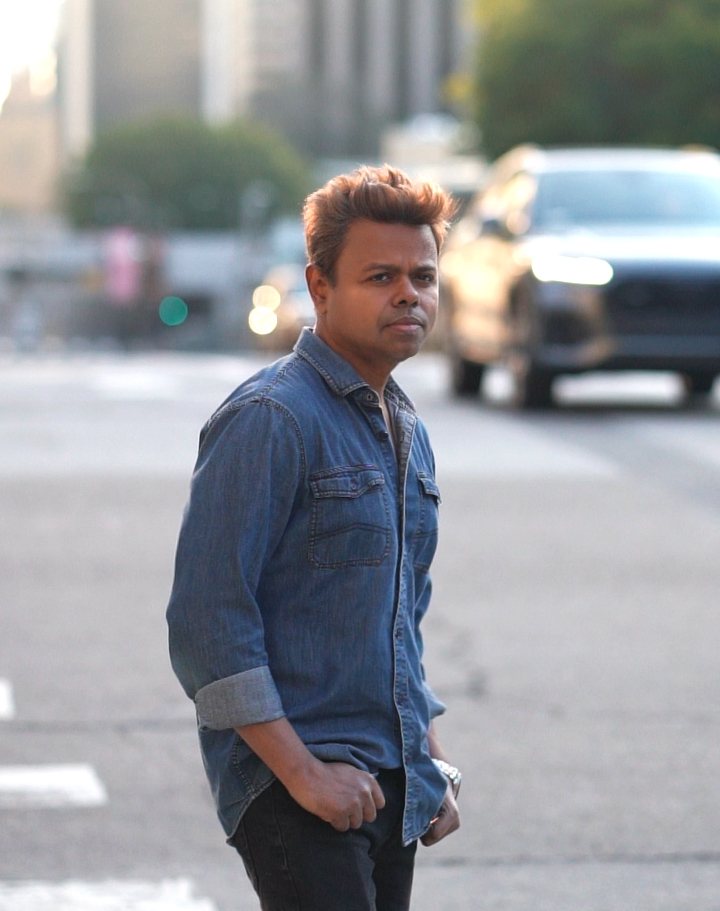
- Krsna Solo in 2024
- Born: Amitav Sarkar; Siliguri, West Bengal, India
- Education: National Institute of Design
- Occupations: Music composer; music producer; playback singer; lyricist
- Years active: 2011–present

Krsna Solo (born Amitav Sarkar) is an Indian music composer, singer-songwriter and music producer. His work includes Jolly LLB (2013), Oonga (2013). Tamanchey (2014), and Tanu Weds Manu Returns (2015). He also known for composing the score for the British documentary India's Daughter (2015) directed by Leslee Udwin.

== Early life ==
Krsna Solo was born to a Bengali family in Siliguri, West Bengal, India. After completing his schooling from Kolkata, he graduated from the National Institute of Design, Ahmedabad in Films Communication. Thereafter, he came to Mumbai to pursue his childhood dream to become a musician and started his career as a film director in advertising. After a few years, he became an active musician and debuted in Hindi cinema.

== Discography ==
=== As composer ===
Year	Film	Notes
2026	Bharat Bhhagya Viddhaata	
2019	Why Cheat India	
2018	Meri Nimmo	
2018	Phamous	
2017	Mirza Juuliet	
2016	Cute Kameena	
2015	Tanu Weds Manu Returns	
2015	India's Daughter	
2014	Tamanchey	
2013	Issaq	
2013	Jolly LLB	
2013	Oonga	
2011	Tanu Weds Manu	Won – Filmfare RD Burman Award for New Music Talent, Stardust Awards for Best New Music Director

=== As playback singer ===
- "Rangrez" Tanu Weds Manu (2011)
- "Khamakha" Tamanchey (2014)
- "Da di da da" Cute Kameena (2016)
- "Muhabbat Ko Misuse" Mirza Juuliet (2017)

=== As lyricist ===
Year	Title	Film
2014	Khamakha	Tamanchey

== Accolades ==
Year	Award	Category	Work	Result	Refs
2020	7th Noida International Film Festival’20	Best Music	SMASH (Chidi Balla)	Won	
2019	South Film and Arts Academy Festival (SFAAF)	Best Original Score	SMASH (Chidi Balla)	Won	
2016	Producers Guild Film Award for Best Music Director	Best Music Composer	Tanu weds Manu Returns	Nominated	
2015	63rd Golden Reel Award (MPSE)	Best Music Composer/ Music Editor	India's Daughter	Won	
2012	Stardust Awards	Best Debut Music Composer	Tanu Weds Manu	Won	
2012	57th Filmfare Awards	Filmfare RD Burman Award for New Music Talent	Tanu Weds Manu	Won	
2012	Screen Awards	Best Music Composer	Tanu Weds Manu	Nominated	
2011	GiMA Award For Best Music Debut	Best Debut Music	"Rangrez" – Tanu Weds Manu	Won	
2011	4th Mirchi Music Awards	Upcoming Music Composer of The Year	"Jugni" from Tanu Weds Manu	Nominated	
