= Tanu Weds Manu =

2011 Indian film by Aanand L. Rai

- Theatrical release poster
- Directed by: Aanand L. Rai
- Written by: Himanshu Sharma
- Produced by: Vinod Bachan; Shailesh R Singh
- Starring: R. Madhavan; Kangana Ranaut; Jimmy Sheirgill; Deepak Dobriyal; Eijaz Khan; Swara Bhaskar
- Cinematography: Chirantan Das
- Edited by: Hemal Kothari; Rahul Bachhuwan
- Music by: Songs: Krsna Solo; Kuly RDB; Background Score: Krsna Solo; Pritesh
- Production companies: Sanjay Singh Films; Soundrya Production; Paramhans Creations
- Distributed by: Viacom18 Motion Pictures
- Release date: 25 February 2011
- Running time: 119 minutes
- Country: India
- Language: Hindi
- Budget: ₹17.5 crore
- Box office: ₹56 crore

Tanu Weds Manu is a 2011 Indian Hindi-language romantic comedy film directed by Aanand L. Rai and produced by Shailesh R Singh. It stars R. Madhavan, Kangana Ranaut, Jimmy Sheirgill, Eijaz Khan, Swara Bhaskar and Deepak Dobriyal. The story of the film has been written by Himanshu Sharma, the music was directed by Krsna Solo, and the lyrics were penned by Rajshekhar.

Tanu Weds Manu was released on 25 February 2011 and proved to be a commercial success, particularly in Delhi, Uttar Pradesh and Punjab. It was dubbed in German and released under the title Tanu Und Manu Trauen Sich. Upon release, it received mixed-to-positive reviews from critics, with praise directed towards its refreshing concept, screenplay, soundtrack and performances of the cast, particularly that of Ranaut.

At the 57th Filmfare Awards, Tanu Weds Manu won the R. D. Burman Award for New Music Talent (Krsna Solo), in addition to a Best Supporting Actress nomination for Bhaskar's performance.

The film was remade in Telugu as Mr. Pellikoduku (2013). A sequel, titled Tanu Weds Manu: Returns was released on 22 May 2015.

== Plot ==
Manoj Kumar Sharma alias Manu is an NRI doctor living in London. He comes to India to find an Indian bride and get married. His parents have already shortlisted some girls for him to meet, and they, along with his friend Pappi, take him to Kanpur to meet Tanuja Trivedi, alias Tanu. After they landed in Kanpur, Manu was beaten up by some goons at the rail station. Tanu's mother tells her that Tanu has a fever and has just taken sleeping pills. Manu takes a look at sleeping Tanu and falls in love. He agrees to the marriage, and both families decide to go on a pilgrimage and seek the blessings of God before the engagement.

During the train journey, Tanu tells Manu that she had intentionally taken sleeping pills to fall asleep and avoid meeting him. She tells him that she loves someone else and also has a tattoo of his name on her body written 'Awasthi.' She demands that Manu should now reject her. Manu is extremely disappointed because he likes her immensely, but he dutifully does the decent thing. Weeks pass, and he meets several prospective girls from suitable families; one of them is Ayushi Awasthi, whose brother is Raja Awasthi, who pleads with Manu to marry his sister. Manu agrees that Ayushi is very nice but says he is 'helpless' and cannot marry her as he is in love with another girl. Raja understands something is amiss and respects Manu for being honest.

Later at home, Manu declares he would rather not get married now and expresses his wish to leave for London. But Pappi informs him about the wedding of another school best friend, Jassi, and they travel to Kapurthala (Punjab) to attend it. Upon arriving, Manu finds out that Tanu is also attending the wedding and that she is Payal's best friend, Jassi's bride-to-be. Tanu and Manu get along well, and their parents arrive at the wedding.

Tanu thinks that Manu has called them up and is trying to reestablish their canceled wedding connection. She is upset. This causes tension among her, Manu, Jassi, and Payal; feeling guilty, Manu decides to leave. But Tanu comes to the rail station to stop him and tells him she is on the verge of eloping, that she and her lover are going to get secretly married in a registrar's office, and then present her parents with a fait accompli. She asks him to stay till the wedding.

Manu is heartbroken and leaves back to Chandigarh. He meets Raja and comes to know Raja is getting married, and Tanu is in fact his girlfriend. Raja and Tanu go to the marriage registrar's office. But their marriage could not be registered because of time constraints and no pen. Though Manu had a pen, he does not offer it. Manu convinces Tanu's parents for the marriage of Tanu and Raja.

While wedding shopping, Manu confesses to Tanu that he was in love with her all along, and he, in fact, had brought a pen to the registrar's office but hid it intentionally. Raja learns about Manu and Tanu. Thus, Tanu fights with Raja. Tanu confesses to Raja that she has feelings for Manu but Raja still demands Tanu marry him, declaring that a month of fulfilling her wifely duties will make her forget everything. She is torn and emotional, and pulling Manu aside, she demands to clearly know whether he loves her or not. Manu does so. Tanu, relieved and elated, decides to marry Manu, not Raja.

Raja arrives with a wedding procession at the wedding of Tanu and Manu. Raja brandishes a gun and creates a scene. Manu, however, refuses to be scared and begins reasoning with Raja. Raja aims the gun and almost pulls the trigger, but thinks better of it in the end. He says no one wants him to marry Tanu; not even his mother has given him her blessings for it. He then reminds Manu of the promise he had made to him, and he decides to honor his promise and tells Tanu he might be many things, but he is not a betrayer. Raja sacrifices his love, and he claims that he loves Tanu, so for her happiness, he leaves as the proceedings for Tanu and Manu's wedding start once more.

== Cast ==
- R. Madhavan as Dr. Manoj "Manu" Kumar Sharma
- Kangana Ranaut as Tanuja "Tanu" Trivedi
- Jimmy Sheirgill as Raja Awasthi
- Eijaz Khan as Jasspreet "Jassi" Singh Sheirgill
- Swara Bhaskar as Payal Sinha
- Deepak Dobriyal as Pappi Tiwari
- K K Raina as Kishan Kumar Sharma
- Dipti Mishra as Anju Sharma
- Rajendra Gupta as Rajendra Trivedi
- Navni Parihar as Radha Trivedi
- Neha Kaul as Ayushi Awasthi, Raja's sister
- Ravi Kishan as Raja's friend (cameo appearance)
- Archana Shukla as Bulbul Sas

== Production ==
The film had been originally announced with Konkana Sen Sharma playing the role of Tanu. However, after a period of stall, the film was re-announced with Kangana Ranaut replacing the character.

== Soundtrack ==
The soundtracks are composed by Krsna Solo in his film debut, with lyrics written by Rajshekhar. It was released through T-Series on 4 February 2011.

== Reception ==
=== Critical response ===
Tanu Weds Manu opened to mixed-to-positive reviews from critics, with praise directed towards its refreshing concept, screenplay, soundtrack and performances of the cast, particularly that of Ranaut; however it was criticized for its story and pacing.

Critic Taran Adarsh of Bollywood Hungama rated it 3.5/5 and noted that "Tanu Weds Manu is a feel-good, light-hearted entertainer with the right dose of humor, drama and romance, besides a popular musical score and some smart dialogue that act as toppings. If you like simple, uncomplicated films that tug at your heartstrings, then chances are that you might just like this sweet little rom-com."

Nikhat Kazmi, from Times of India stated "the first thing that strikes you about Tanu Weds Manu is a striking sense of familiarity. It wasn't long before you saw Shahid Kapoor playing a similar sacrificial lover to Kareena Kapoor in Jab We Met. But the deja vu doesn't last long. For despite the predictable – and paper-thin – storyline, the film manages to hook you with its sheer atmospherics. Fun while it lasts, Tanu Weds Manu throws up Bollywood's newest obsession – small town girls and their gunas (values) – once again. A meatier storyline and a less messed-up climax would have worked wonders for the film."

Anupama Chopra from NDTV gave 2.5/5 and noted "Though the director picked up an interesting subject, he has not succeeded in executing his story effectively on screen – there are not enough laughs in the film. But there is something missing to make it a perfect romantic comedy. If you are looking for a great romantic comedy, this is not the one, but watch it for Madhavan and his chemistry with Dobriyal."

Critic Sukanya Verma from Rediff gave it a 3/5 rating explaining "Tanu Weds Manu is a pleasant experience for most part. Sharma fails to maintain the zing till the very end though. A disappointing, lengthy and gabby third-act makes Tanu Weds Manu's running time of 2 hours and 15 minutes longer than it is. It doesn't take offence at anything but will charm you anyway.

Monica Chopra from Sify rated 3/5 and mentioned "What's not to like? There's the shaadi-baaraat, the romance, lovely clothes, and the atmospherics that transport you into another world.Yes, the film is cliché-ridden, has elements of rom-coms like Jab We Met, and Shergill's character-track doesn't quite add up, but the film isn't aiming for anything more than a one-time watch entertainer. Anand L Rai (Thodi Life Thoda Magic, Strangers) makes a sweet romantic comedy that'll have you smiling as you leave the theatre."

Rajeev Masand of CNN IBN gave it a 2 star-rating explaining "Tanu Weds Manu isn't all bad. There are portions in the first-half that are enjoyable. But held together by a fractured script, they fail to take good shape."

=== Box-office ===
Tanu Weds Manu collected Rs. 185 million in its first week of release. The film held up well in its second week with collections of around Rs. 85.0 million. Its 2-week total was Rs. 272.5 million nett. Its business was steady in the third week with around Rs. 50 million nett which took the collections to Rs. 322.5 million nett in 3 weeks. In the fourth week, the film collected Rs. 35.0 million nett taking its 4-week collections to Rs. 360 million nett.

== Accolades ==
Award Ceremony	Category	Recipient	Result	Ref
57th Filmfare Awards	Best Supporting Actress	Swara Bhaskar	Nominated	
57th Filmfare Awards	R. D. Burman Award	Krsna Solo	Won	
4th Mirchi Music Awards	Upcoming Female Vocalist of The Year	Ujjaini Mukherjee (for "Manu Bhaiya")	Nominated	
4th Mirchi Music Awards	Upcoming Music Composer of The Year	Krsna Solo (for "Jugni")	Nominated	
4th Mirchi Music Awards	Song representing Sufi tradition	"Rangrez"	Nominated	
2012 Zee Cine Awards	Best Actor in a Supporting Role – Female	Swara Bhaskar	Won	
13th IIFA Awards	Best Actress	Kangana Ranaut	Nominated	
13th IIFA Awards	Best Supporting Actress	Swara Bhaskar	Nominated	
13th IIFA Awards	Best Performance In A Comic Role	Deepak Dobriyal	Nominated	
13th IIFA Awards	Best Story	Himanshu Sharma	Nominated	
18th Screen awards	Best Actor	R. Madhavan	Nominated	
18th Screen awards	Best Actress	Kangana Ranaut	Nominated	
18th Screen awards	Best Supporting Actress	Swara Bhaskar	Nominated	
18th Screen awards	Best Music Director	Krsna Solo	Nominated	
18th Screen awards	Best Dialogue	Himanshu Sharma	Nominated	

== Remake ==
Tanu Weds Manu was remade in Telugu as Mr. Pellikoduku with actress Isha Chawla along with South Indian actor Sunil.

== Sequel ==
Following the positive response from Tanu Weds Manu, the team considered making a sequel to carry a story forward showing the next chapter of the couple's life. The sequel titled Tanu Weds Manu Returns was released on 22 May 2015. The film received positive reviews from critics, with particular praise directed towards Ranaut's performance.. It was a super-hit at the box-office with the worldwide collection of ₹252 crore (US$26 million).
