= Aanand L. Rai =

Hindi film director and producer (born 1970/1971)

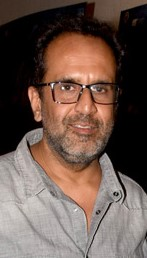
- Rai at a screening for Tumbbad in 2018
- Born: 1970/1971 (age 54–55); Delhi, India
- Occupations: Film director, film producer
- Years active: 2007–present

Aanand L. Rai (born 1970/1971) is an Indian film director and producer known for directing the romantic comedy-dramas Tanu Weds Manu (2011) and its sequel Tanu Weds Manu Returns (2015), and the romantic drama Raanjhanaa (2013), with the latter two earning him nominations for the Filmfare Award for Best Director.

He then directed the big-budget romantic drama Zero (2018), the romantic fantasy comedy-drama Atrangi Re (2021) and the family comedy-drama Raksha Bandhan (2022).

== Early life and background ==
Rai was born and brought up in Delhi. After his schooling in Delhi, he did his computer engineering from Aurangabad, Maharashtra.

His family's original surname was Raisinghani, and had shifted to Dehradun from Sindh, after partition of India in 1947.

== Career ==
=== Pre-film career ===
Rai started his career as an engineer, but soon left it and moved to Mumbai where he started assisting his elder brother television director Ravi Rai in various television series. After gaining substantial experience, he moved on to directing his own shows.

=== Early work (2007–2008) ===
He made his directorial debut with the psychological thriller Strangers (2007) starring Jimmy Shergill, Kay Kay Menon, Nandana Sen, Sonali Kulkarni. The film was based on Alfred Hitchcock's Strangers on a Train (1951). The film received negative reviews from critics, and emerged as a commercial disaster at the box-office. Similar was the fate of his next film, Thodi Life Thoda Magic (2008) starring Jackie Shroff and Parmeet Sethi.

=== Breakthrough and success (2011–2015) ===
In 2011, he started his production house, Colour Yellow Productions, which helmed all his future production ventures.

The same year, he achieved his breakthrough with the romantic comedy-drama Tanu Weds Manu (2011) starring R. Madhavan and Kangana Ranaut in lead roles. The film emerged as his first commercial success, grossing ₹56 crore worldwide. It received mixed-to-positive reviews from critics upon release, with particular praise for its novel concept and screenplay. The film was the first instalment of the Tanu Weds Manu franchise.

In 2013, he directed the romantic drama Raanjhanaa, starring Dhanush in his Bollywood debut alongside Sonam Kapoor, Abhay Deol and Swara Bhasker in lead roles. The film emerged as his second consecutive commercial success at the box-office, grossing ₹94 crore worldwide, ranking as the tenth highest-grossing Hindi film of the year. It received mixed-to-positive reviews from critics upon release, with particular praise for its writing and direction. Raanjhanaa earned Rai his first nomination for the Filmfare Award for Best Director.

In 2015, Rai directed the romantic comedy-drama Tanu Weds Manu Returns, the sequel to Tanu Weds Manu, with all the cast members reprising their roles from the first instalment. The film opened to widespread critical acclaim upon release, and emerged as his third consecutive commercial success. It grossed ₹243.6 crore worldwide and emerged as a blockbuster at the box-office, ranking as the fifth highest-grossing Hindi film of the year, and was the highest-grossing female-lead film in India at the time of its release. Tanu Weds Manu Returns earned Rai his second nomination for the Filmfare Award for Best Director.

=== Career decline (2018–present) ===
His next directorial was the big-budget romantic drama Zero (2018) starring Shah Rukh Khan, Anushka Sharma and Katrina Kaif in lead roles. The film tells the story of a love triangle between a dwarf man, a scientist with cerebral palsy, and an alcoholic actress. Despite high hype prior to release due to its A-list star-cast and Rai's previous successful ventures, the film emerged as a commercial disaster at the box-office, and received mixed-to-negative reviews from critics.

In 2021, he directed the romantic fantasy comedy-drama Atrangi Re starring Dhanush, Sara Ali Khan and Akshay Kumar in lead roles. Delayed due to the COVID-19 pandemic in India and rescheduled multiple times due to the nationwide lockdown due to the pandemic, the film was released on Disney+ Hotstar, bypassing theatrical release. It opened to mixed reviews from critics upon release, with praise for its unconventional plot, but criticism for its incoherent screenplay and execution of overall storyline.

In 2022, he directed Kumar again alongside Bhumi Pednekar in the family comedy-drama Raksha Bandhan. The film received mixed-to-negative reviews from critics, and emerged as a commercial disaster at the box-office.

In 2025, Rai directed Dhanush and Kriti Sanon in Tere Ishk Mein, a spiritual sequel to Raanjhanaa. The movie was a moderate commercial success.

== Filmography ==
List of Aanand L. Rai film credits
Year	Title	Director	Producer	Notes
2007	Strangers	Yes		
2008	Thodi Life Thoda Magic	Yes		
2011	Tanu Weds Manu	Yes		
2013	Raanjhanaa	Yes	Yes	
2015	Tanu Weds Manu: Returns	Yes	Yes	
2016	Nil Battey Sannata		Yes	
2016	Happy Bhag Jayegi		Yes	
2017	Shubh Mangal Saavdhan		Yes	
2018	Mukkabaaz		Yes	
2018	Meri Nimmo		Yes	
2018	Happy Phirr Bhag Jayegi		Yes	
2018	Manmarziyaan		Yes	
2018	Tumbbad		Yes	
2018	Zero	Yes	Yes	
2019	Laal Kaptaan		Yes	
2020	Shubh Mangal Zyada Saavdhan		Yes	
2021	Haseen Dillruba		Yes	
2021	Atrangi Re	Yes	Yes	
2022	Good Luck Jerry		Yes	
2022	Raksha Bandhan	Yes	Yes	
2022	An Action Hero		Yes	
2023	Jhimma 2		Yes	Marathi film
2024	Phir Aayi Hasseen Dillruba		Yes	
2025	Fussclass Dabhade		Yes	Marathi film
2025	Tere Ishk Mein	Yes	Yes	
2026	Tu Yaa Main		Yes	
