= Tanu Weds Manu Returns =

2015 Indian film by Aanand L. Rai

- Theatrical release poster
- Directed by: Aanand L. Rai
- Written by: Himanshu Sharma
- Produced by: Krishika Lulla; Aanand L. Rai
- Starring: R. Madhavan; Kangana Ranaut; Jimmy Sheirgill; Swara Bhaskar; Deepak Dobriyal
- Cinematography: Chirantan Das
- Edited by: Hemal Kothari
- Music by: Songs: Krsna Solo; Tanishk-Vayu; (Tanishk Bagchi); Background Score: Krsna Solo
- Production company: Colour Yellow Productions
- Distributed by: Eros International
- Release date: 22 May 2015
- Running time: 128 minutes
- Country: India
- Language: Hindi
- Budget: ₹40 crore
- Box office: est. ₹255.3 crore

Tanu Weds Manu Returns is a 2015 Indian romantic comedy film directed by Aanand L. Rai, written by Himanshu Sharma, and produced by Rai and Krishika Lulla under Eros International and Colour Yellow Productions. A sequel to the 2011 film Tanu Weds Manu, it stars R. Madhavan and Kangana Ranaut as the titular characters, reprising their roles with Ranaut also additionally portraying Datto, a Haryanvi athlete, thus featuring her in dual roles, while Jimmy Sheirgill, Deepak Dobriyal, Swara Bhaskar, and Eijaz Khan also return to reprise their roles from the original. Set four years after the events of the 2011 original, it centers on Manu's soured relationship with Tanu and prospects of an impending divorce after he falls in love with her lookalike Datto, a Haryanvi athlete, who he decides to marry.

Principal photography began in October 2014 and the film was released on 22 May 2015. The soundtrack and film score were composed by Krsna Solo, who made his debut with the prequel, with songwriter Vayu and musician Tanishk Bagchi making their debuts as composer duo Tanishk-Vayu through the guest composition "Banno", which was also the first single to be released. Lyrics for Krsna's compositions were penned by Rajshekhar, who also debuted with the prequel. Saroj Khan and Bosco–Caesar served as choreographers, with Chirantan Das handling the cinematography, while Hemal Kothari edited the film.

Made on a budget of ₹39 crore (equivalent to ₹59 crore or US$6.1 million in 2023), the film earned a total of ₹255.3 crore (equivalent to ₹385 crore or US$40 million in 2023) globally and became one of the highest-grossing Hindi film of 2015. It is also one of the highest-grossing Indian franchises.

Tanu Weds Manu Returns received critical acclaim, with particular praise directed towards Ranaut's performance, with many considering it one of the best Bollywood sequels ever made. The film received 3 awards at the 63rd National Film Awards, including Best Actress (Ranaut). At the 61st Filmfare Awards, it received 3 awards, including Best Actress (Critics) (Ranaut). Film Companion listed Ranaut's performance in the film among the 100 greatest performances of the decade (2010s).

== Plot ==
Four years after their marriage in Kanpur, Tanuja "Tanu" Sharma and Manoj "Manu" Kumar Sharma moved to London, where Manu works, and are revealed to be suffering an unhappy and dysfunctional marriage. During a psychiatric discussion gone wrong, Tanu gets Manu detained in a mental asylum as revenge after he loses her temper on her, and returns to her hometown Kanpur, India, when her friend Payal calls her from India and tells Tanu that she has given birth to a baby girl. Before leaving London, Tanu rings Manu's friend Pappi Kutti in Delhi and tells him to immediately leave for London and release Manu.

Back in Kanpur at her parents' home, Tanu encounters a crafty law student called Chintu who has become a lodger but refuses to pay rent or vacate the room. Chintu befriends Tanu and slowly develops a crush on her, bemused by her antics. Tanu also learns that her ex-boyfriend, Raja Awasthi, is getting engaged to another girl and gets jealous. Pappi reaches London and gets Manu out and they reach India, where Manu sends a legal notice to Tanu to make her apologise, but she does not respond.

One day, Manu goes to Delhi University to give a medical speech, where he sees Kusum "Datto" Sangwan, a young Haryanvi student-athlete, who resembles Tanu. He slowly gets obsessed with Kusum and keeps following her despite Pappi's warning. One day after Kusum confronts them, Manu tells her about Tanu. Kusum sympathises and they gradually develop feelings for each other. Manu tells Kusum he wants to marry her and meets Omi, her elder brother. Omi has no issues with Manu but shows a picture of the boy his wife wanted Kusum to marry, who turns out to be Raja. Payal Gill, Tanu's best friend, calls Tanu and confesses that her newborn baby's father is not her husband Jassi Gill.

Chintu gets jealous of Raja going around with Tanu and their ongoing feelings and tells her father about it. He even sends Manu a nasty legal notice for a divorce, without Tanu's consent, but Manu responds by agreeing, which shocks Tanu. She confronts Chintu who says he loves her but Raja shoves him off. Raja also discovers his engagement is being called off as Manu is going to marry the new girl in his life. Both Raja and Tanu are enraged and decide to go to Delhi to confront Manu.

Manu, Kusum and Pappi travel to Chandigarh to convince Komal Gill, Payal's sister-in-law whom Pappi loves, to ditch her own wedding and elope with Pappi instead. As Pappi tries to convince Komal, Kusum is mistaken by everyone at the wedding as Tanu, including Payal, who tells her she had a test-tube baby secretly as Jassi had azoospermia. Kusum gets frantic on hearing these secrets and gives Payal a karate chop which knocks her out. She also lands a karate chop on Komal and they smuggle her to Jhajjar, where Kusum's villagers are waiting. But once her family finds out she loves Manu, they attack Manu and Pappi and lock up Kusum. Omi arrives and saves the day with his logic. The village agrees to Kusum and Manu's marriage.

As wedding preparations start, Tanu and Raja reach there with Jassi, Payal, their baby and Manu's parents. Tanu makes fun of Kusum who snaps at her saying she is a state-level champion who is independent, loving and honest. She also reveals the truth behind Payal's baby in front of Jassi. A shocked and drunk Tanu meets Manu at night who brutally brushes off her declarations of love. In the morning, Tanu tells Kusum she is sorry about her behaviour and tells her she would like to stay and help out in their wedding preparations as a final attempt to stop the wedding.

Payal and Jassi are reunited. On the eve of the wedding, Tanu gets drunk and dances in front of Manu during the baraat procession. Her parents arrive with Chintu and are shocked to see Tanu shattered as Manu leaves for his marriage. Tanu sits quietly as Manu is marrying Kusum, until Kusum stops and confronts Manu, who confesses he still loves Tanu and cannot marry her. Kusum honourably releases him and walks off, only to break down privately. She then knocks Chintu out when he starts making a scene.

Tanu and Manu reconcile, while Kusum and Raja are shown sharing an amicable conversation.

== Cast ==
- R. Madhavan as Dr. Manoj "Manu" Kumar Sharma
- Kangana Ranaut in a double role as
  - Tanuja "Tanu" Trivedi Sharma
  - Kumari Kusum "Datto" Sangwan
- Jimmy Sheirgill as Raja Awasthi
- Deepak Dobriyal as Pappi Tiwari
- Swara Bhaskar as Payal Gill
- Eijaz Khan as Jasspreet "Jassi" Singh Gill
- Mohammed Zeeshan Ayyub as Advocate Arun "Chintu" Kumar Singh
- Rajendra Gupta as Rajendra Trivedi
- Navni Parihar as Radha Trivedi
- K.K. Raina as Kishan Kumar Sharma
- Dipti Misra as Anjana "Anju" Sharma
- Rajesh Sharma as Omprakash "Omi" Sangwan
- Aakash Dahiya as Deepak Chaudhary
- Shishir Sharma as Digvijay Sangwan
- Gulzar Dastur as Mohini Sangwan
- Rahul Shankalya as Rajinder Sangwan
- Kajal Bhadana as Pinky Bhatia
- Manu Rishi as Manu's lawyer (Tees Hazari Court, Delhi)

== Production ==
Following the positive response to Tanu Weds Manu post release in February 2011, the team considered making a sequel to carry the story forward showing the next chapter of the couple's life. The lead couple R. Madhavan and Kangana Ranaut both announced their interest of being a part of a proposed sequel, months after the original's release. In September 2011, Sunil Lulla of Eros International announced that they had signed on director Aanand L. Rai to work on a second part of the film titled Tanu Weds Manu: Season 2. Early reports claimed that the lead actors would be seen in dual roles, while it was also speculated that Shahid Kapoor may replace Madhavan in the lead role. In January 2012, the project was postponed to allow Anand Rai to proceed with another venture Raanjhanaa (2013), while the makers also wanted Ranaut to finish her commitments with Krrish 3 (2013) as the sequel demanded a different look.

Following the release and success of Raanjhanaa in July 2013, Anand Rai confirmed that the sequel to Tanu Weds Manu was still active and would feature the original cast in the leading roles, playing down reports that Imran Khan and Anushka Sharma were to replace them. Screenwriter Himanshu Sharma began working on the film in July 2013 and revealed that only the first ten minutes would have a London backdrop, before the story returns to Lucknow, Kanpur and Delhi. He went on to confirm the working title, though added it potentially may also be known as Tanu Weds Manu Extra Large. Pre-production continued through late 2013, with Ranaut's two-month trip to the USA delaying the start of the shoot in early 2014. She later confirmed that she would play a dual role in the film, that of an athlete apart from Tanu, and the team scouted for a body double to be used in scenes featuring both characters. Dhanush, who had worked in Raanjhanaa, was revealed to be playing a cameo appearance in the film.

The team began filming in October 2014 in Lucknow, after a small launch ceremony. The first motion poster of the film was released on 23 March 2015 on the birthday of the leading actress, Kangana Ranaut at a special event in Delhi. "Ja Ja Ja Ja Bewafa" sung by Geeta Dutt in 1954 film Aar Paar, was picturised on Ranaut, playing the background.

== Controversies ==
In May 2014, the producers of the original film, Sanjay Singh, Vinod Bachchan and Shailesh Singh filed a legal notice stating that the director did not have the rights to make a sequel without their permission. Anand Rai replied stating that the trio only had rights over the first film and no direct rights over sequels or the franchise. In a further reply, Bachchan revealed that they were interested in making a sequel and should have been approached ahead of Eros International.

In May 2015, a critic at the Mumbai Mirror gave the film 2.5 stars and a generally negative review. The newspaper later "revised" the critic's rating to 3.5 stars, based on reader feedback.

== Soundtrack ==
The music and background score is composed by Krsna Solo, and the lyrics were written by Rajshekhar. However, the song "Banno", which is a remake of the song "Banno Teri Ankhiyan Soorme", from the 1996 film "Dushmani: A Violent Love Story", has been composed by Tanishk-Vayu (Tanishk Bagchi), and written by Vayu, and the song "Mari Gali" has been written by N.S. Chauhan and SurjRDB.

== Release ==
The film was released worldwide on 22 May 2015 with nearly 2200 screens in India. The film was released overseas with 350 screens across the United States of America, United Kingdom, Canada, Pakistan, New Zealand, Australia and UAE. According to Box Office India, the film had an average opening in circuits like Andhra Pradesh and West Bengal. Tanu Weds Manu Returns opened to almost 60% occupancies in screens up north, while screens across other states and metros had registered figures of 40–50%. The satellite rights of the film were sold to Zee TV.

== Critical reception ==
Upon release, Tanu Weds Manu: Returns garnered widespread critical acclaim, with Ranaut's performance receiving particular praise. On the Indian film review aggregator website The Review Monk, Tanu Weds Manu: Returns received an average score of 7.3/10 based on 43 reviews and 94% critics being in the favor. On the review aggregator website Rotten Tomatoes, the film holds a score of 64% based on 11 reviews and an average rating of 7.2/10.

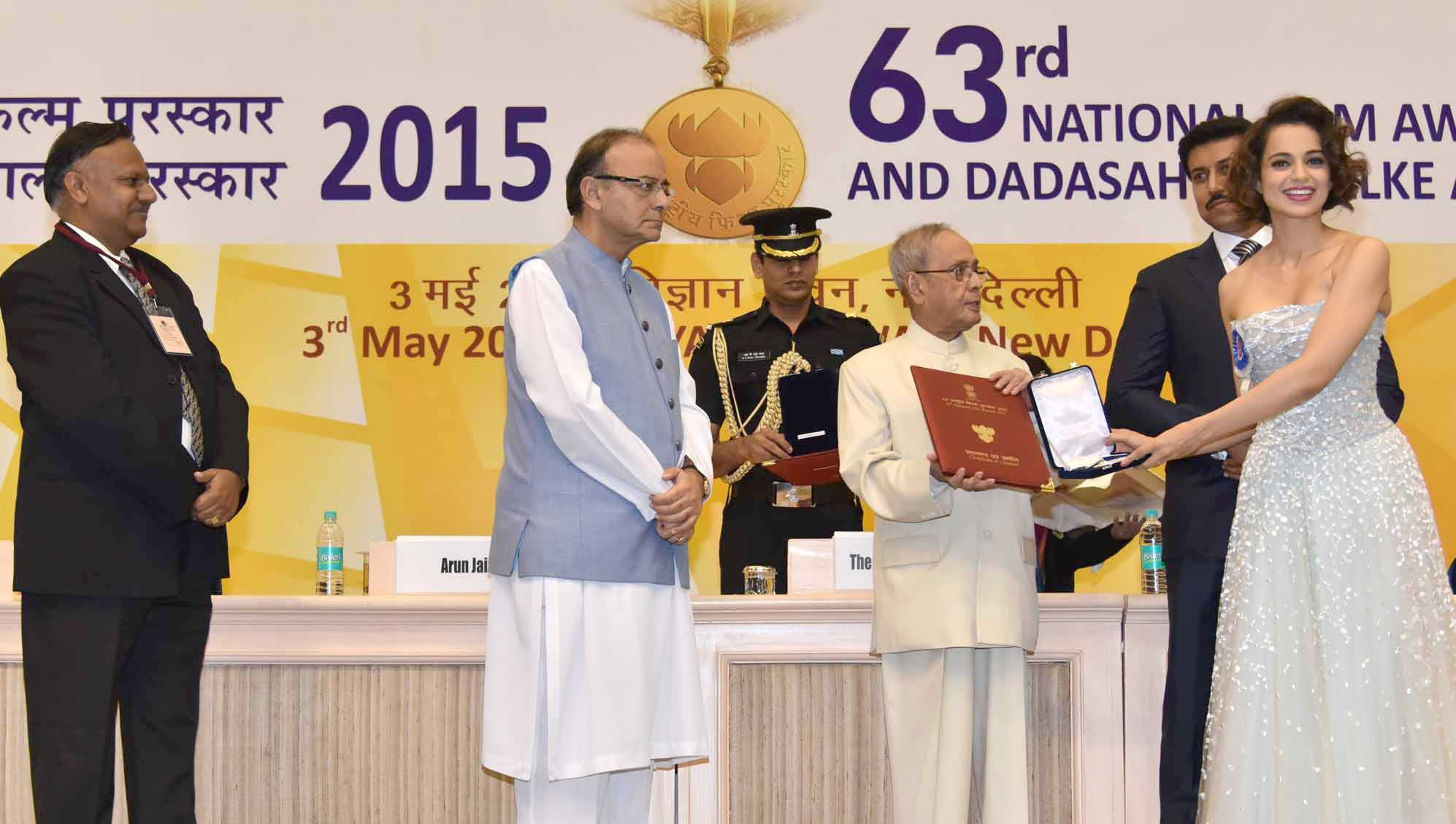
Ranaut's performance in Tanu Weds Manu: Returns garnered widespread critical acclaim winning her the National Film Award for Best Actress at the 63rd National Film Awards.

=== India ===
Stutee Ghosh of The Quint gave the film a rating of 5/5 and wrote, ‘‘Tanu Weds Manu Returns is gob-smackingly good; It is a laugh riot and keeps you engaged till the end’’. Praising Ranaut's performance she further wrote, ‘‘In an industry where a ‘‘double – role” entails merely sporting two different shades of lipstick, Kangana is a delight to watch. Both as the madcap Tanu and the short haired, freckled Haryanvi Datto, she is incredible’’. Srijana Mitra Das of Times of India gave the film a rating of 4.5/5 and wrote, ‘‘Tanu Weds Manu Returns is a total delight that keeps you laughing, sighing, cheering and guessing throughout’’. Praising Ranaut's performance she further wrote, ‘‘Tanu Weds Manu Returns boasts one of the finest double roles ever in Hindi cinema; Kangana is breathtakingly good, both as doll-like drama queen Tanu and simple, dignified, earthy Kusum. Each role is performed with sensitivity, precision and flair, Kangana displaying the confidence of a talent Queen’’. Rajeev Masand of CNN-IBN gave the film a rating of 4/5 and praised Ranaut's performance by writing, ‘‘Tanu Weds Manu Returns is no doubt a showcase for the immense talent of Ranaut, who sinks her teeth into this ‘double-role’ challenge, and creates two strikingly different characters; The actress makes you care for both characters. Watch this film for Kangana Ranaut, who's at the top of her game’’. Anupama Chopra of Film Companion gave the film a rating of 4/5 and praised Ranaut's performance by writing, ‘‘Watching Kangana Ranaut in Tanu Weds Manu Returns is like watching an athlete at the top of her game — consummate skill with effortless grace. As both the rebel without a cause, Tanu, and the Haryanvi sportswoman Kusum, Kangana is pitch-perfect. The film rests on Kangana’s shoulders and she carries it with her Herculean talent’’. Sweta Kaushal of Hindustan Times gave the film a rating of 4/5 and called it an "entertainer" and a "must-watch". Praising Ranaut's performance she wrote, ‘‘Kangana has done a fabulous job with her characters Tanu and Datto; From the body languages of the two women to their accents, Kangana aces it to the T. She proves yet again that she is one of the few heroines in Bollywood who is willing to experiment with different roles and still come out as the most convincing every time’’.

Ananya Bhattacharya of India Today gave the film a rating of 4/5 and wrote, ‘‘Tanu Weds Manu Returns deserves a watch for the sheer brilliance that it is, and the way Kangana has nailed her roles’’. Praising Ranaut's performance she further wrote, ‘‘Kangana carries the film on her able shoulders, reminding one why the actress is among the most sought-after ones in the industry today. Ranaut infuses her Tanu with a rare charm and as far as Kusum is concerned, the actress does a mind-blowing job of getting the Haryanvi girl pitch-perfect. Never for a moment is one allowed the opportunity to think that it is one actress cast in dual roles in the film’’. Bollywood Hungama gave the film a rating of 4/5 called it a ‘‘must-watch’’. They wrote, ‘‘Tanu Weds Manu Returns is a must watch, especially for Kangana's spellbinding performance, outstanding plot and amazing one-liners’’. They called Ranaut's performance in the film her ‘‘career-best’’ and further wrote, ‘‘The undisputed captain of the ship is Kangana Ranaut, who delivers a career best performance. Her performance in the film is definitely award worthy. She really knows how to carry the film on her shoulders; The impact of her roles is so significant that you just cannot imagine any other actress in her role’’. Sukanya Verma of Rediff gave the film a rating of 4/5 and called Ranaut a ‘‘powerhouse’’. Praising her performance she wrote, ‘‘As Datto her body language, which alternates between assertive and serene depending on the surrounding, and the sureness with which she rattles off her mother tongue is nothing short of flawless and as Tanu the talented star's calibre shines through in her understanding of a wife's thinly veiled manipulations that are but an attempt to restore what she haughtily believes to be rightly hers. Kangana, the powerhouse makes it difficult to pick a side’’.

Saibal Chatterjee of NDTV gave the film a rating of 3.5/5 and called it an "entertaining" and "engaging" film. Praising Ranaut's performance he wrote, ‘‘Kangana Ranaut, in a magnificently effective double role, powers the comic drama forward with an effortless act. The film vindicates the general belief that Kangana is currently in a zone where she can do no wrong; On one hand she is the bubbly and recklessly rebellious Tanu and on the other she embodies the no-nonsense persona of Datto, The actress fleshes out this pair of distinct individuals with such energy and finesse that it becomes difficult at times to tell that it is the same actress playing the two roles. In one word, astounding’’. Manjusha Patil of Koimoi gave the film a rating of 3.5/5 and wrote, ‘‘This is a real Desi rom com with a slightly quirky touch. It will leave a big smile on your face as you leave the theatre’’. Praising Ranaut's performance she further wrote, ‘‘This film belongs to Kangana Ranaut; This is another stellar performance by her after Queen (2014)’’. Sarita Tanwar of DNA gave the film a rating of 3.5/5 and called its dialogues ‘‘great’’, its characters ‘‘endearing’’ and the performances ‘‘top class’’. She called Ranaut the ‘‘crowning glory’’ of the film and wrote, ‘‘The film’s crowning glory is Kangana who betters herself with every film she does. This time, as Tanu, she gets to do much more in terms of diversity. But her portrayal of Kusum steals the show this time. Heartwarming, honest and edgy, Kangana as Kusum is the life of the film; Watch this film for the one-woman-show of Kangana Ranaut’’. Shubhra Gupta of The Indian Express gave the film a rating of 3/5 and praised Ranaut's performance by writing, ‘‘Kangana Ranaut plays it beautifully, mixing up the familiar with the new. I would buy a ticket for her’’.

Anuj Kumar of The Hindu wrote, ‘‘Known for creating a tangible atmosphere of small town, the team once again hit the ground running and doesn’t leave the audience’s pulse for even a moment’’. Calling Ranaut's performance in the film ‘‘gutsy’’ he further wrote, ‘‘Carrying forward her good form, it is a double delight from Kangana as she brilliantly delineates both the characters. She gives each of them a distinct identity which goes much deeper than the haircut and artificial dentures. It is her gutsy performance that prevents the film from getting reduced to a frivolous comedy’’. Rachit Gupta of Filmfare called Tanu Weds Manu Returns a ‘‘intricately designed’’ and a ‘‘well crafted’’ film. Praising Ranaut's performance he wrote, ‘‘Kangana Ranaut’s performance as both Tanu and Kusum is so enchanting that you can hardly see past her. She owns this film and she delivers it in five star fashion; The film is another fine feather in Kangana Ranaut’s flourishing hat’’. Ajit Duara of Open named Tanu Weds Manu Returns as the ‘‘funniest movie of the year’’ and praised Ranaut's performance by writing, ‘‘What Ranaut cleverly does with this double role is to demarcate feminine and masculine characteristics in women; Both women are attractive, but in different ways. This is a complex portrait of a woman’s persona and sexuality, and Ranaut has delivered it beautifully through a hilarious comedy of manners’’. Mihir Fadnavis of Firstpost called the film a ‘‘crowd pleaser’’ and praised Ranaut's performance by writing, ‘‘The real draw of Tanu Weds Manu Returns is that you get two Kangana Ranauts to entertain you, and she delivers in a huge way. Both her avatars are likeable’’.

=== Overseas ===
Prarthna Sarkar of International Business Times gave the film a rating of 4.5/5 and wrote, ‘‘To make a sequel better than its prequel is a tough challenge, but director Aanand. L. Rai aces it’’. Calling Ranaut the ‘‘star of the show’’ he further wrote, ‘‘Kangana is the star of the show. Unmistaken accent, perfect gait and subtle expressions, the leading lady's portrayal of Datto and Tanu is praiseworthy’’. Faiza S Khan of The Guardian gave the film a rating of 4/5 and called it a ‘‘unusually spiky Bollywood romcom’’. Praising Ranaut's performance she wrote, ‘‘Kangana Ranaut shines in this entertaining and slightly unconventional look at marriage which takes swipes at elitism and potshots at patriarchy’’. Manjari Saxena of Gulf News gave the film a rating of 3.5/5 and described it as a ‘‘hilarious journey’’. Praising Ranaut's performance he wrote, ‘‘Ranaut portrays gamut of emotions brilliantly in her double role as the wife who feels wronged and the practical but young girl in love. The National Award winning actress nabs Datto’s tomboyish and rustic demeanour with the same elan as the stylish and sexy Tanu; The Queen actress is clearly here to rule’’. Shilpa Jamkhandikar of Reuters praised Ranaut's performance in the film by writing, ‘‘Kangana Ranaut walks away with the entire film, playing both Tanu and Kusum with panache, in what is probably the defining female performance of 2015’’.

=== Year-end lists ===
Sukanya Verma of Rediff cited Tanu Weds Manu Returns as one of the best Hindi films of 2015. Times of India listed it as one of the best films of 2015. The Hindu listed it as one of the people's choice best Hindi movies of 2015. Film Companion listed Ranaut's performance in the film among the 100 greatest performances of the decade (2010s). NDTV listed Ranaut as one of the best Bollywood actors of 2015. Deccan Chronicle listed Ranaut as one of the 11 powerful Bollywood actresses of 2015. Gayatri Gauri of Firstpost listed both the characters Ranaut portrayed in the film (Tanu and Datto) as one of the best female characters of the year 2015. Raja Sen of Rediff named Ranaut's character in the film, Datto, as one of the most memorable Bollywood characters of 2015. Suresh Mathew of The Quint listed Ranaut's character in the film, Datto, as one of the most endearing and loveable characters from Bollywood films of 2015. Filmfare listed both the characters Ranaut portrayed in the film (Tanu and Datto) as one of the strongest women characters in Bollywood.

== Box office ==
Tanu Weds Manu Returns earned ₹380 million (US$3.9 million) in its opening weekend in India, for a worldwide gross of ₹650 million (US$6.7 million). Trade analysts reported that the film took in the biggest opening weekend collections for a Bollywood film that year, and also recovered its production budget in the first three days. The film earned ₹85 million (US$880,000) on its first Monday. It earned ₹975 million (US$10 million) after its second weekend. The film earned ₹458 million (US$4.8 million) in its second week in India for a two-week domestic total of ₹1.15 billion (US$12 million).

The film earned ₹38.10 crore in its opening weekend and broke the record for the highest opening weekend collections for a women-centric film in India previously held by Priyanka Chopra's Mary Kom. However, the record was later surpassed by Ranaut's own 2019 film, Manikarnika: The Queen of Jhansi. Additionally, the film earned ₹70.02 crore in its opening week which is the second-highest opening week collection for a female centric film in India behind The Kerala Story (2023). On 2 June 2015, Tanu Weds Manu Returns became the first Indian female-lead film to enter the ₹100 crore club.

According to Bollywood Hungama projection, Tanu Weds Manu Returns earned ₹255.3 crore (equivalent to ₹385 crore or US$40 million in 2023) worldwide at the end of its theatrical run, to become one of the highest-grossing Hindi film of 2015 . It is the second-highest grossing female-lead film in India behind The Kerala Story (2023). It is also one of the highest-grossing Indian franchises.

== Legacy ==
After watching Tanu Weds Manu Returns, Deepanjana Pal of Firstpost stated that this movie could make Ranaut the female Khan of Bollywood. She wrote, ‘‘The reason people want to watch Tanu Weds Manu Returns, the reason there are great box office expectations of this film and the reason you sit through its two hours is Kangana Ranaut’’. She further wrote, ‘‘If the film does as well as it is expected to, then Ranaut will be the female equivalent of the Khans of Bollywood. She can act in films that are thorough disappointments, but she sells them to you with such charm and style that you don't really care that she and the stories she's telling deserve better’’. After the success of the film, S. Shivakumar of The Hindu stated, ‘‘Kangana Ranaut will not be on the wish-list of the Khans of Bollywood for a co-star because of her intimidating screen presence; She doesn’t need them’’. Kunal Purandare of Forbes India called Ranaut the ‘outsider’ who rules Bollywood and stated, ‘‘The success of Tanu Weds Manu Returns which made a whopping ₹150 crore-plus business at the box office meant that the industry could no longer turn a blind eye to her. She began to draw audiences to the theatres purely on the basis of her reputation of being a solid actor. She continued to raise the bar and opted for a path that many other actresses feared to tread’’.

The Times of India listed Tanu Weds Manu Returns as one of the top twenty best Bollywood films of all-time. Rajiv Vijayakar of Bollywood Hungama listed the film as one of the twelve sequels which are better than the earlier films. He stated, ‘‘More people watched Tanu Weds Manu after and because they had loved Tanu Weds Manu Returns’’. Devesh Sharma of Filmfare listed Tanu Weds Manu Returns as one of the best Bollywood films featuring double roles. IMDb listed it as one of the fifty best dual role Indian movies of all time. Saheli Maity of Koimoi listed it as one of the top sixty movies with multiple dose roles. Priyanka Vartak of The Free Press Journal listed the film as well as Ranaut's dual-role in the film as one of the ten best and famous double role films and double-roles in Bollywood. On the occasion of International Women's Day, 2019, ZEE5 listed Tanu Weds Manu Returns as one of the eleven Bollywood films that depict how feminism is done right. Salva Mubarak Vogue India listed it as one of the thirteen best wedding-centric films of the decade (2010s). Bollywood actor Rishi Kapoor called Tanu Weds Manu Returns a modern-day version of his own classic film Prem Rog (1982).

Ranaut's portrayal of a dual-role in the film received widespread acclaim. India TV listed Ranaut as one of the ten best Bollywood stars who excelled a new language for their movie. Hindustan Times listed Ranaut as one of the five actors who aced the accent they had onscreen. Srijana Mitra Das of Times of India called Ranaut's portrayal of a dual-role in the film as one of the finest double roles ever in Hindi cinema. MSN listed Ranaut's dual-role in the film as one of the most iconic double roles in Bollywood movies. The Free Press Journal listed Ranaut's performance in the film as one of the ten greatest lead performances that went beyond the requirements of the script to create memorable characters. They called Ranaut's portrayal of a dual-role in the film as one of the best dual roles ever attempted in a Hindi film. Filmfare listed Tanu Weds Manu Returns as one of movies that showcased Ranaut's class as an actor. They called Ranaut's role in the film as one of her most ‘‘iconic’’ roles and wrote, ‘‘Kangana Ranaut really flaunts her versatility with this film as even though she plays two distinct characters, not for a second you’ll feel it’s the same person playing them’’. Film Companion listed Ranaut's performance in the film among the 100 greatest performances of the decade (2010s).

The characters in Tanu Weds Manu Returns has become some of the most popular and recognizable characters in Hindi Cinema. Filmfare listed both the characters Ranaut portrayed in the film (Tanu and Datto) as one of the strongest women characters in Bollywood. Madhavi Pothukuchi of Vagabomb listed both the characters Ranaut portrayed in the film (Tanu and Datto) as one of the ten Bollywood female characters who gave us important life lessons. Shilpa Dubey of Pinkvilla listed Ranaut's character in the film, Tanu, as one of the iconic female characters from the 2010s decade of Bollywood. Srishti Magan of ScoopWhoop listed Dobriyal's character in the film, ‘Pappi Ji’, as one of the best side characters from Hindi movies who were so brilliant that they deserve their own story. Bhavya Sadhwani of IndiaTimes listed Madhavan and Dobriyal's characters in the film, Manu and Pappi ji, as one of the fifty characters that resonated with us and are likely to stay etched in our memories for a long long time.

Over the years, Tanu Weds Manu Returns along with Tanu Weds Manu has become a cult classic franchise. It is also one of the most successful Indian franchises. Additionally, its dialogues and one-liners has reached a cult status spawning several online memes. The film is considered as one of the most important and best films of director Rai as well as one of the best films of both Ranaut and Madhavan. On the occasion of the tenth anniversary of the first part of the franchise, Tanu Weds Manu, Director Rai revealed that people identify or refer him as ‘‘Woh Tanu Weds Manu wala Aanand Rai’’ (transl. That's Tanu Weds Manu's maker, Aanand Rai).

== Awards and nominations ==
At the 63rd National Film Awards, Tanu Weds Manu Returns won Best Actress (for Ranaut), Best Original Screenplay and Best Dialogues. At the 61st Filmfare Awards ceremony, the film won two awards: Best Actress (Critics) (for Ranaut) and Best Dialogue. The film also received nominations for Best Film and Best Director (Rai) among others at the ceremony.
