= Huma Qureshi =

Indian actress (born 1986)

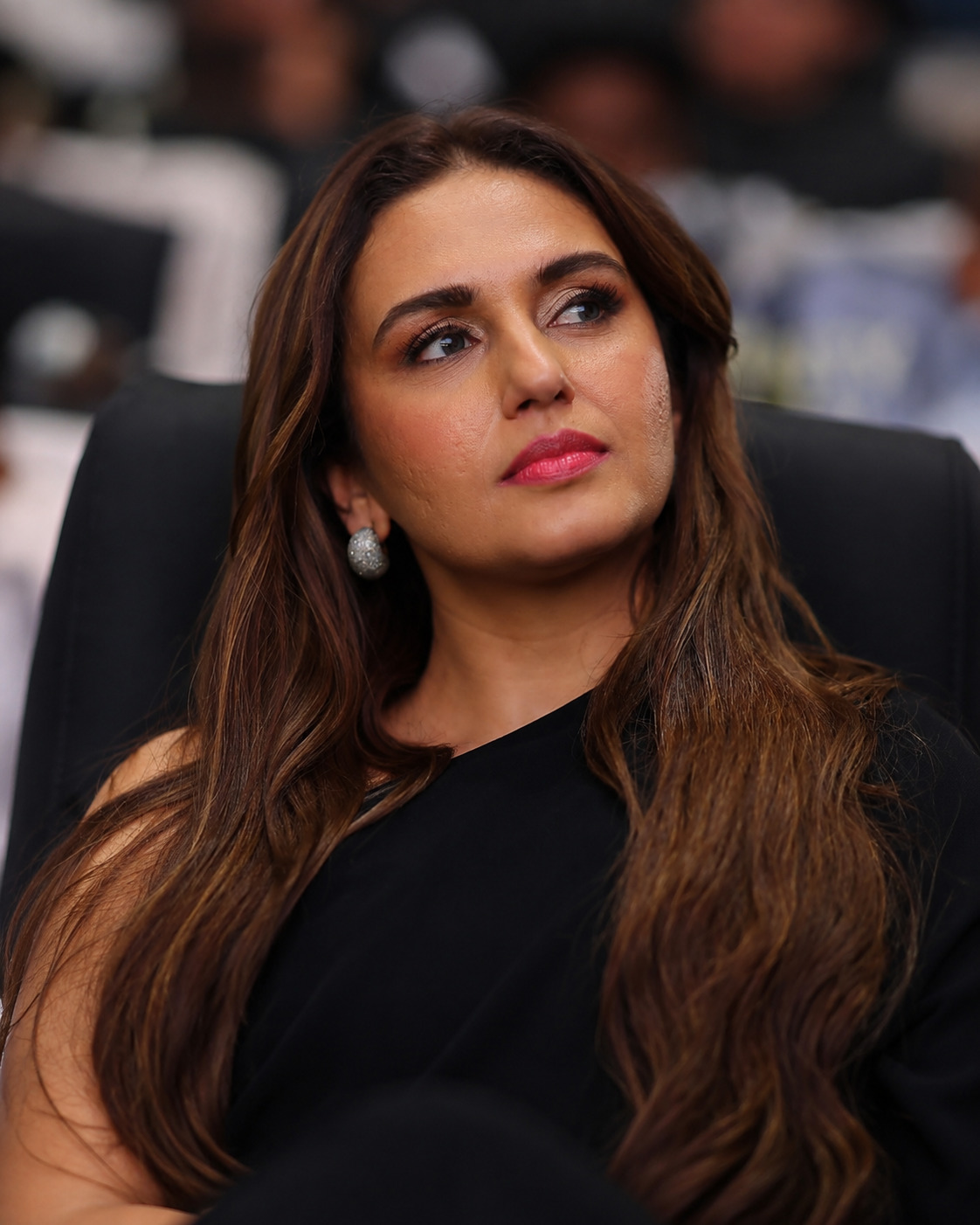
- Qureshi in 2026
- Born: Huma Saleem Qureshi; 28 July 1986 (age 40); New Delhi, India
- Education: University of Delhi
- Occupation: Actress
- Years active: 2012–present
- Relatives: Saqib Saleem (brother)

Huma Saleem Qureshi (pronounced [ˈɦʊmaː səˈliːm qʊˈɾɛːʃiː]; born 28 July 1986) is an Indian actress who primarily appears in Hindi-language films. Her accolades include a Filmfare OTT Award along with nominations for three Filmfare Awards.

Qureshi studied history in Delhi while she worked as a theatre actor and model. She then moved to Mumbai and signed a two-year contract with Hindustan Unilever to appear in television commercials. During the shoot for a Samsung mobile commercial, Anurag Kashyap noticed her acting ability and signed her for a three-film deal with his company, marking her film debut with a supporting role in the two-part 2012 crime drama Gangs of Wasseypur. Her performance in the film earned her a nomination for the Filmfare Award for Best Supporting Actress.

Qureshi's career progressed with roles in the horror film Ek Thi Daayan, the black comedy Dedh Ishqiya (2014), the revenge drama Badlapur (2015) the Marathi road drama Highway (2015), the comedy Jolly LLB 2 (2017), and the Tamil action drama Kaala (2018). Qureshi starred in the 2019 dystopian drama series Leila and was praised for her portrayal of the lead role in the crime drama series Maharani since 2021. After appearing in the American film Army of the Dead (2021) and in the Tamil action thriller Valimai (2022), she received praise for her performance in the crime comedy Monica, O My Darling (2022).

== Early life and work ==
Qureshi was born on 28 July 1986 into a Muslim family in New Delhi, India. Her father, Saleem Qureshi, is a restaurateur who runs a chain of 10 restaurants (Saleem's); her mother, Ameena Qureshi of Kashmiri descent who is a housewife. She has three brothers, including actor Saqib Saleem. The family relocated to Kalkaji, South Delhi, when Qureshi was a child. She completed her bachelor's in History with Honours from the Gargi College—University of Delhi. Later, she joined Act 1 theatre group and performed in a few theatre productions. N. K Sharma was her mentor and acting teacher during her theatre days. She has worked with several NGOs and assisted a documentary filmmaker.

In 2008, she moved to Mumbai to audition for film roles, auditioning for a film, Junction, which was never made: "I never thought of coming to Mumbai or being an actress. But when my friend called me for an audition for a movie called Junction, it set me thinking. Sadly, the film never got made". Qureshi signed a two-year contract with Hindustan Unilever to appear in their television commercials. She promoted a range of products, including Samsung Mobile (with Aamir Khan), Nerolac (with Shah Rukh Khan), Vita Marie, Saffola oil, Mederma cream and Pears soap. During a shoot for a Samsung Mobile commercial, director Anurag Kashyap was impressed with her acting ability and promised to use her in a film. Qureshi recalled: "I didn't believe him then. You hear lots of such stories in this industry, so I wasn't waiting with bated breath". Kashyap kept his promise, though, signing her for a three-film deal with his company Anurag Kashyap Films.

== Acting career ==
=== Breakthrough (2012–2013) ===
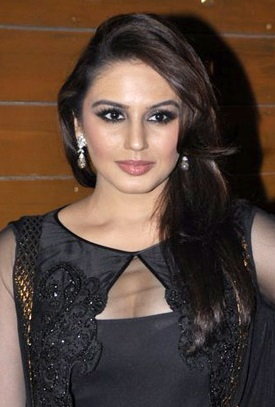
Qureshi at an event in 2013

Qureshi was initially scheduled to make her film debut with Billa II, a Tamil gangster-thriller, directed and produced by Chakri Toleti, after surviving an audition out of 700 candidates. Although cast as the female lead, when the film was delayed, Qureshi left the project to honour other work commitments. When asked whether she had any regrets, she said: "I have no regrets. I wish it had worked out, but it didn't. I am not someone who sits and laments over things. I was approached for several other south films too, but the roles weren't what I was looking for".

Qureshi made her feature film debut with a supporting role in Anurag Kashyap's critically acclaimed two-part crime drama Gangs of Wasseypur – Part 1 (2012), where Qureshi was cast as the supportive wife of a criminal (played by Nawazuddin Siddiqui). She described her character as a small-town airhead who thinks she is the prettiest girl in the village: "Mohsina tries to copy everything she sees on the big screen in her own little ways. She is heavily influenced by Bollywood". The film premiered at the 65th Cannes Film Festival, and both the film and Qureshi received positive reviews from critics. Govind Nihalani noted her screen presence, comparing the actress to Smita Patil: "an earthiness, sincerity, intensity and warmth of personality, qualities that distinguished Smita, apart from the fact that she was a very fine and instinctive actress. Huma is a good enough actress on her own, someone who can stand apart from the crowd and hold her own". Taran Adarsh of Bollywood Hungama noted: "Huma Qureshi, who's introduced much later in the film...is wonderful". The Express Tribune added: "When it comes to looks, [Huma] is different from the typical Bollywood actors". In 2012, Qureshi was ranked third, the highest female position, on Rediff.com's annual list of "Bollywood's Top Ten Debutants" (male and female). Following the success of the first part, she reprised her role of Mohsina in the second instalment of the Gangs of Wasseypur series, Gangs of Wasseypur – Part 2. The film premiered in the Cannes Directors' Fortnight at the Cannes Film Festival with its prequel. It opened to wide critical acclaim, and her portrayal again received positive reviews. Madhureeta Mukherjee of The Times of India said: "Huma Qureshi, with her gaudy clothes, designer sun-glasses and unusual attractiveness is the hottest cheez in Wasseypur. She beautifully lends support as a powerful man's 'prouder' better-half, even in his worst crimes", and Taran Adarsh found her "simply fantastic". Both films earned her Best Female Debut and Best Supporting Actress nominations at several award ceremonies (including the Filmfare Award). Qureshi described Gangs of Wasseypur as a "life-changing film".

That same year, Qureshi completed her three-film contract with Anurag Kashyap Films by starring in Luv Shuv Tey Chicken Khurana, a romantic comedy, which describes a quest for an ancient family dish; Chicken Khurana. Directed by Sameer Sharma, she played the role of a feisty Punjabi girl, Harman (star Kunal Kapoor's love interest). The film was a financial success, and Rediff.com noted that "Huma Qureshi looks right for the role and she delivers a wonderful performance". Aniruddha Guha of the Daily News and Analysis said: "[Qureshi], on the other hand, is charming as the fiery Punjaban, Harman. Her refreshingly natural acting style impresses again in a role that has shades of her character in Gangs of Wasseypur". However, Anupama Chopra found her performance to be "a little bland".

=== Career progression (2014–2018) ===
For her next feature, Qureshi was cast as a witch in the supernatural thriller Ek Thi Daayan (2013), alongside Emraan Hashmi, Konkona Sen Sharma and Kalki Koechlin. Dealing with the themes of witchcraft, the film was based on 'Mobius Trips', a short story written by Konkona Sen Sharma's father. It received mixed reviews from critics, but proved to be a profitable venture at the box office. Qureshi's performance was also well received. The Indian Express said: "Qureshi has just a few good moments, but makes the most of them", while Koimoi noted that "Qureshi has a remarkably pleasant and confident screen presence". Raja Sen particularly praised the female cast and wrote "The three leading ladies are smashing in their roles...Each plays their given role with frighteningly good flair, and each deserves a big hand." After appearing in Ek Thi Daayan, Qureshi, along with R. Madhavan hosted the 60th ceremony of the National Film Awards, an event presented by the Directorate of Film Festivals to honor the Best Films of the year (then 2012) in the Indian cinema by the President of India. The ceremony was held on 3 May 2013, at the Vigyan Bhavan during the presidency of Pranab Mukherjee.

Shortly afterwards, Qureshi played the titular character in the short movie Sujata—released as one of the segments of Shorts, an anthology film by Anurag Kashyap. She played the eponymous lead as a young girl who is struggling to come out of the clutches of her tormenting cousin brother (played by Satya Anand). The film was screened at Indian Film Festival of Los Angeles before its release and received generally positive reviews, and Qureshi's performance was critically acclaimed and earned her a Special Mention Award at the ceremony. Her subsequent release that year included the underworld drama D-Day, in which she was featured as Zoya Rehman, an explosive R.A.W agent with an ensemble cast including Irrfan Khan, Arjun Rampal, Rishi Kapoor and Shruti Haasan. During the script narration, the director Nikkhil Advani offered Qureshi the choice of which woman to play, either Suraiya (later played by Hassan) or Zoya; she decided on Zoya to expand her horizons as an actress. The film was a flop at the box office and received mixed feedback from critics, while Qureshi's performance received favourable reviews; Subhash K. Jha mentioned that Qureshi's acting is "effortlessly appealing and effective."

In 2014, Qureshi featured in Abhishek Chaubey's black comedy Dedh Ishqiya (2014), a sequel to the 2010 film Ishqiya, co-starring Madhuri Dixit, Arshad Warsi and Naseeruddin Shah. Dedh Ishqiya was a commercial success, earning ₹270 million (US$4.1 million) in India and abroad and Qureshi received praise for her portrayal of the promiscuous companion of a con woman (played by Dixit). In a 5-star review, Raja Sen commented that "Qureshi uses her fiercely intelligent eyes to great effect", whilst Mohar Basu agreed, saying that "Huma Qureshi is brilliant and confident. The actress has in her the vivacious energy that proves her talent." Qureshi's last appearance of 2014 was Rochak Kohli's music video "Mitti Di Khusboo" with Ayushmann Khurrana. India Today noted, "The chemistry the two Ayushmann and Huma share onscreen has the raw flavor of the countryside romance".

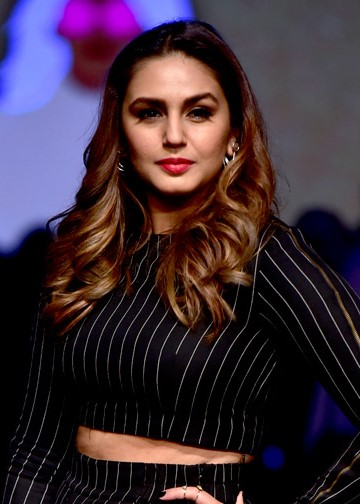
Qureshi walking the ramp at Lakme Fashion Week, 2018

The following year, Qureshi appeared as a prostitute in Sriram Raghavan's crime thriller Badlapur, alongside Varun Dhawan and Nawazuddin Siddiqui. Raja Sen praised her acting and wrote that she "is hauntingly good as a call-girl". The film was a commercial success, and Qureshi received the Filmfare Best Supporting Actress nomination. Umesh Kulkarni's Marathi film Highway marked her debut in Marathi cinema. It received mixed reviews from critics, and proved to be a moderate box office success. The same year, she acted in the collaborative film X: Past Is Present. It was directed by a team of eleven filmmakers with Qureshi appearing in "Knot", a segment directed by film critic Raja Sen, where she appeared alongside Anshuman Jha. 2016 marked the debut of Qureshi in Malayalam cinema with White. She starred in dual roles in the film alongside Mammootty. The film opened to generally negative reviews from critics.

Qureshi's first release of 2017 was the courtroom comedy drama Jolly LLB 2, where she appeared alongside Akshay Kumar. A sequel to the 2013 film Jolly LLB, the film received mixed reviews from critics and was a box office success. Her next film was Gurinder Chadha's British-Indian historical drama Viceroy's House. The film follows the story of Viceroy's House in 1947 during the partition of India and was screened at the 67th Berlin International Film Festival. She then appeared along with her brother Saqib Saleem in Prawaal Raman's horror film Dobaara: See Your Evil (2017), a remake of Mike Flanagan's Hollywood flick Oculus (2013). Flanagan also served as the executive producer of the film. Qureshi starred opposite Rajinikanth in the Tamil language film Kaala. It was released on 7 June 2018. In 2018, she also became the judge of the reality show India's Best Dramebaaz.

=== Career expansion (2019–present) ===
In 2019, Qureshi played the title character in the Netflix dystopian series Leila, based on the novel of the same name. Directed by Deepa Mehta, Shanker Raman and Pawan Kumar, the series premiered on 14 June 2019 to mostly positive reviews from critics with particular praise for Qureshi's performance. Hiba Beg of The Quint felt that Qureshi's "raw presence in the show is as real as it gets on screen." In 2021, she starred in the web series Maharani in which she played the role of Rani Bharti, which was also received very well by critics and earned her the Filmfare OTT Award for Best Actress (Critics) in a Drama Series. Later that year, she made her Hollywood debut with the film Army of the Dead. She also returned to TV and hosted the reality show Fit Fab Feast in Zee Cafe. She also featured in Akshay Kumar's film Bell Bottom and starred in her second Tamil film Valimai.

In 2022, she acted in her third web series, Mithya, which was the remake of the British series Cheat. She was also seen in lead roles in the films Monica, O My Darling and Double XL in 2022.

In April 2022, Qureshi signed to play chef Tarla Dalal in her biopic. Titled Tarla, it was produced by Ronnie Screwvala, Ashwiny Iyer Tiwari and Nitesh Tiwari, and directed by Piyush Gupta. It was released on 7 July 2023 on ZEE5. In the same year, she reprised her role as Pushpa Pandey Mishra in the film Jolly LLB 3.

In 2026, she starred as a deaf and mute assassin in the film Baby Do Die Do. She further starred in the Geetu Mohandas-directorial Toxic.

== Personal life ==
Qureshi has been in relationship with director and writer Mudassar Aziz. According to media reports, the couple broke up in 2022, after three years of dating. As of 2024, Qureshi is being linked with actor Rachit Singh by tabloids.

According to a May 2026 report by Hindustan Times, Qureshi and Singh will marry in an intimate ceremony in October or November 2026.

Qureshi is a Muslim. In an interview, she said being a Muslim, she never felt 'different' in India. She further said, "I never realised that I am Muslim and I am different. My father is running a restaurant, Saleem's in Kailash Colony (of Delhi). In my personal experience, I have never felt it."

== Filmography ==
Key
†	Denotes films that have not yet been released

=== Films ===
- All films are in Hindi unless otherwise noted

Year	Title	Role	Notes	Ref.
2011	Trishna	Herself	Special appearance in song "Maintenance"	
2012	Gangs of Wasseypur – Part 1	Mohsina		
2012	Gangs of Wasseypur – Part 2	Mohsina		
2012	Luv Shuv Tey Chicken Khurana	Harman		
2013	Ek Thi Daayan	Tamara		
2013	Shorts	Sujata	Segment: "Sujata"	
2013	D-Day	Zoya Rehman		
2014	Dedh Ishqiya	Muniya		
2015	Badlapur	Jhimli		
2015	Highway	Mahalakshmi	Marathi film	
2015	X: Past Is Present	Veena	Segment: "Knot"	
2016	White	Roshni Menon	Malayalam film	
2017	Ek Dopahar	Raina	Short film	
2017	Jolly LLB 2	Pushpa Pandey Mishra		
2017	Viceroy's House	Aalia	English film	
2017	Dobaara: See Your Evil	Natasha Merchant		
2018	Kaala	Zareena	Tamil film	
2020	Ghoomketu	Herself	Cameo appearance	
2021	Army of the Dead	Geeta	American film	
2021	Bell Bottom	Adeela Rehman		
2022	Valimai	Sophia	Tamil film	
2022	Gangubai Kathiawadi	Dilruba	Special appearance in song "Shikayat"	
2022	Double XL	Rajshri Trivedi		
2022	Monica, O My Darling	Monica Machado		
2023	Tarla	Tarla Dalal		
2025	Maalik	Mallika	Item song	
2025	Bayaan	Roohi Kartar		
2025	Jolly LLB 3	Pushpa Pandey Mishra		
2025	Single Salma	Salma Rizvi		
2026	Baby Do Die Do	Baby KarMarKar		
2026	Toxic	Elizabeth	Kannada-English bilingual film	
2026	Pooja Mere Jaan	Sana		
TBA	Gulabi †	TBA	Completed	

=== Television ===
Year	Title	Role	Notes	Ref.
2012	Upanishad Ganga	Pundalik's wife / Nati / Hussaini		
2018	India's Best Dramebaaz	Judge	Reality show	
2019	Leila	Shalini		
2021–present	Maharani	Rani Bharti		
2021	Fit Fab Feast	Host		
2022	Mithya	Juhi Adhikari		
2024	Madness Machayenge – India Ko Hasayenge	Herself		
2025	Delhi Crime	Meena Choudhary/Badi Didi		

=== Music video appearances ===
Year	Title	Singer(s)	Composer	Ref.
2014	"Mitti Di Khushboo"	Ayushmann Khurrana	Rochak Kohli	
2016	"Tumhe Dillagi"	Rahat Fateh Ali Khan	Nusrat Fateh Ali Khan	

== Awards and nominations ==
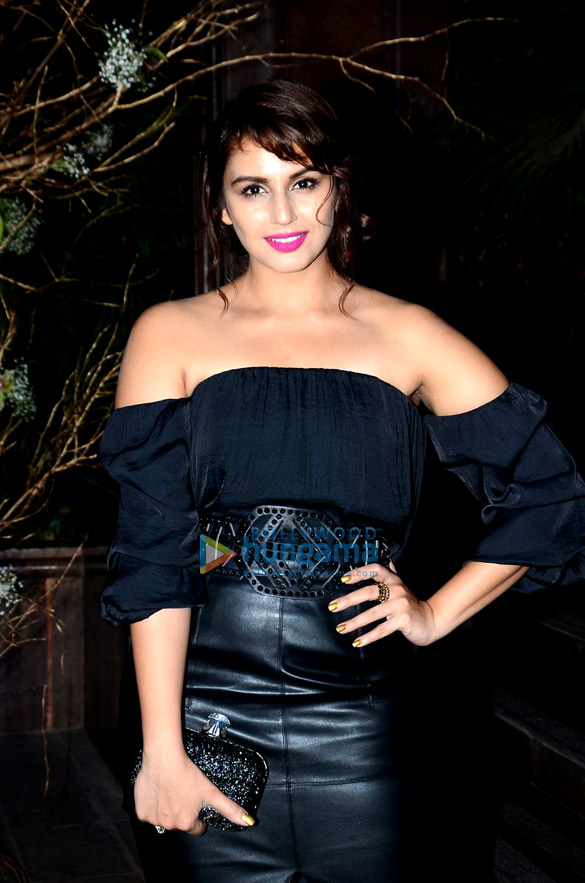
Qureshi in 2016

Year	Film	Award	Category	Result	Ref.
2012	Gangs of Wasseypur	BIG Star Entertainment Awards	Most Entertaining Actor (Film) Debut—Female	Won	
2012	Gangs of Wasseypur	Filmfare Awards	Best Female Debut (also for Luv Shuv Tey Chicken Khurana)	Nominated	
2012	Gangs of Wasseypur	Filmfare Awards	Best Supporting Actress	Nominated	
2012	Gangs of Wasseypur	International Indian Film Academy Awards	Best Actress	Nominated	
2012	Gangs of Wasseypur	Screen Awards	Most Promising Newcomer–Female	Nominated	
2012	Gangs of Wasseypur	Screen Awards	Best Supporting Actress	Nominated	
2012	Gangs of Wasseypur	South African Film and Television Awards	Debut Actor of the Year—Female	Won	
2012	Gangs of Wasseypur	Star Guild Awards	Best Female Debut	Nominated	
2012	Gangs of Wasseypur	Stardust Awards	Searchlight Best Actress (also for Luv Shuv Tey Chicken Khurana)	Nominated	
2012	Gangs of Wasseypur	Times of India Film Awards	Best Debut — Female	Nominated	
2012	Shorts	Indian Film Festival of Los Angeles	Special Mention	Won	
2013	D-Day	BIG Star Entertainment Awards	Most Entertaining Actor in a Thriller Film—Female	Nominated	
2014	D-Day	Zee Cine Awards	Best Actor in a Supporting Role—Female	Nominated	
2014	Ek Thi Daayan	Screen Awards	Best Supporting Actress	Nominated	
2014	Dedh Ishqiya	Stardust Awards	Breakthrough Supporting Performance—Female	Won	
2015	Dedh Ishqiya	International Indian Film Academy Awards	Best Supporting Actress	Nominated	
2016	Badlapur	Filmfare Awards	Best Supporting Actress	Nominated	
2021	Maharani	2021 Filmfare OTT Awards	Best Actress in a Drama Series	Nominated	
2021	Maharani	2021 Filmfare OTT Awards	Best Actress (Critics) in a Drama Series	Won	
2023	—N/a	Bollywood Hungama Style Icons	Most Stylish OTT Entertainer	Nominated	
2023	Monica, O My Darling	2023 Filmfare OTT Awards	Best Actress (Web Original Film)	Nominated	
