= Tarla Dalal =

Indian chef (1936–2013)

- Born: 3 June 1936; Poona, Bombay Presidency, British India
- Died: 6 November 2013 (aged 77); Mumbai, Maharashtra, India
- Occupations: food writer, cookbook author, tv chef
- Years active: 1966–2013
- Website: www.tarladalal.com

Tarla Dalal (3 June 1936 – 6 November 2013) was an Indian food writer, chef, cookbook author and host of cooking shows. Her first cook book, The Pleasures of Vegetarian Cooking, was published in 1974. Since then, she wrote over 100 books and sold more than 10 million copies. She also ran the largest Indian food web site, and published a bi-monthly magazine, Cooking & More. Her cooking shows included The Tarla Dalal Show and Cook It Up With Tarla Dalal. Her recipes were published in about 25 magazines and tried in an estimated 120 million Indian homes.

Though she wrote about many cuisines and healthy cooking, she specialized in vegetarian Indian cuisine, particularly Gujarati cuisine. She was awarded the Padma Shri by Government of India in 2007, which made her the first Indian woman from the field of culinary arts to have been conferred the title. She was also awarded Woman of the Year by Indian Merchants' Chamber in 2005.

She died on 6 November 2013 following a heart attack.

== Early life ==
She was born and brought up in Pune, Maharashtra, India. In 1960, she married Nalin Dalal and relocated to Bombay (now Mumbai).

== Career ==
Dalal started conducting cooking classes from her home in 1966, which led to the publication of her first cook book, The Pleasures of Vegetarian Cooking in 1974. The book has sold over 1.5 million copies. Over time, her popularity grew and she became a household name, with housewives and chefs swearing by her recipes.

Tarla Dalal is credited with introducing and popularizing foreign cuisines to the masses. She created vegetarian versions of a lot of non-vegetarian recipes from foreign lands. She revolutionized the cooking industry in India and is the most sold cookbook author in India.

Her books have been translated into numerous languages including Dutch, Russian, Hindi, Gujarati, Marathi and Bengali. She also published cooking magazines. In 2007, she started her 'Total Health Series' cookbook series.

Her range of ready-to-cook mixes, Tarla Dalal Mixes, was acquired by International Bestfoods Ltd. in 2000.

Dalal died at her residence on 6 November 2013 following a heart attack.

== Personal life ==
Tarla Dalal had three children Sanjay, Deepak and Renu with her husband, Nalin, who died in 2005. She lived in an apartment on Nepean Sea Road in South Mumbai.

== Popular culture ==
A biopic Tarla starring Huma Qureshi was released on 7 July 2023 on ZEE5. It was produced by Ronnie Screwvala, Ashwiny Iyer Tiwari and Nitesh Tiwari.

== Selected publications ==
- Indian Vegetarian Cookbook. Hamlyn, 1983. ISBN 978-0600322436
- The Complete Gujarati Cook Book. Sanjay & Co, 1999. ISBN 81-86469-45-1.
- Know your Flours. Sanjay & Co. ISBN 81-89491-89-X.
- Italian Cookbook. Sanjay & Co, 2000. ISBN 81-86469-52-4.
- Healthy Breakfast. Sanjay & Co, 2003. ISBN 81-86469-81-8.
- Sandwiches. Sanjay & Co, 2004. ISBN 81-86469-95-8.
- Curries & Kadhis. Sanjay & Co, 2005. ISBN 81-89491-11-3.
- Chips & Dips. Tarla Dala, 2006. ISBN 81-89491-35-0.
- Baked Dishes. Tarla Dalal, 2006. ISBN 81-89491-39-3.
- Punjabi Khana. Sanjay & Co, 2007. ISBN 81-89491-54-7.
- Delicious Diabetic Recipes: Low Calorie Cooking: Total Health Series. Sanjay & Co, 2002. ISBN 81-86469-69-9.
- Jain Food: Compassionate and Healthy eating, with Manoj Jain and Laxmi Jain, MJain.net, 2005.ISBN 0977317803

== See also ==
- Indian cookbooks
