= Tumse Na Ho Payega (film) =

2023 Indian film by Abhishek Sinha

- Official release poster
- Directed by: Abhishek Sinha
- Written by: Nitesh Tiwari; Nikhil Mehrotra; Varun Agarwal
- Based on: How I Braved Anu Aunty and Co-Founded a Million Dollar Company by Varun Agarwal
- Produced by: Ronnie Screwvala; Siddharth Roy Kapur; Ashwiny Iyer Tiwari; Nitesh Tiwari
- Starring: Ishwak Singh; Mahima Makwana; Gaurav Pandey; Gurpreet Saini; Karan Jotwani
- Cinematography: Navagat Prakash
- Edited by: Chandrashekhar Prajapati
- Music by: Abhishek Arora; Ananya Purkayastha
- Production companies: Star Studios; RSVP Movies; Roy Kapur Films; Earthsky Pictures
- Distributed by: Disney+ Hotstar
- Release date: 29 September 2023
- Running time: 132 minutes
- Country: India
- Language: Hindi

Tumse Na Ho Payega (transl. You won't be able to do it) is a 2023 Indian Hindi-language comedy-drama film directed by Abhishek Sinha and written by Nitesh Tiwari, Nikhil Mehrotra and Varun Agarwal. It is produced by Star Studios, Ronnie Screwvala, Siddharth Roy Kapur, Ashwiny Iyer Tiwari and Nitesh Tiwari. It stars Ishwak Singh, Mahima Makwana, Gaurav Pandey, Gurpreet Saini and Karan Jotwani in the lead role.

The film was released on 29 September 2023 on Disney+ Hotstar.

== Plot ==
Gaurav Shukla is a 28-year-old who is frustrated with his job. He introduces his two best friends Sharad Malhotra "Mal" and Hardik Vaghela through a narration. At the pub, they met Gaurav's childhood crush, Devika, and Arjun Kapoor, Devika's boyfriend. Since their school days, Arjun has been a topper and they were backbenchers. While peeing at the office washroom, Gaurav shouts about his frustrated life and decides to leave the company, which his boss overhears. His boss first tries to convince him to stay, then fires him. Arjun's mother, "Anu Aunty", has come over to Gaurav's home to show off her son's promotion, but after hearing that Gaurav has left the job, starts gossiping about it. Anu Aunty is a society self-appointed guardian who gossips and judges children on their success and failure. Gaurav's crush and friends only know that he had been fired from the job.

At Arjun's promotion party, Gaurav shares his unique startup idea to his friends about delivering homemade food for office going bachelors. In earlier days, he used to carry a tiffin for his ex-colleague. He, along with Mal and Devika, then start delivering boxes to their respective offices. The idea starts to be successful, and they expand their business. They organise a party where Arjun again makes fun of them; they decide to show Arjun what they can do.

They meet investors and appoint staff. They develop an app where if a person opens the app they will find moms around 2 km to deliver food. Things started to get messed up as their investor runs the company like the way Gaurav was working earlier. The company fires the main chefs (the mothers) and replace them with professionals. After the quality fell and the company lost its customer base, the duo had an argument with the investor and decided to return his invested amount but they got to know that they have to return money upon company valuation which is 10 crore 50 lakh. With returning the amount only left with 10 lakh decided to give the employee the last salary.

Now the investor has conspired against Gaurav and Mal and they have arrested. In jail, they got an offer from Arjun's company to sell the company for 30 crore; although Mal agreed, Gaurav decided against it. The two had a fallout and, upon getting bailed by Vaghela, they become separated.

Gaurav, again unemployed, starts looking for a job and Mal also returns to his previous job. Then one day, his mother gave her Provident Fund & Gratuity to restart the business. Anu Aunty arrives at Gaurav's house to tell him that he will once again be a failure, but Gaurav and his mother shout at her and tell her to leave the house. Gaurav does so and once again becomes successful. He started making things like previous. He proposes to Devika, telling her that she has to reply before he had a meeting with the investors, as he feels that he always have a doubt if Devika accepts after a successful meeting.

The next day, Devika accepts Gaurav's proposal and investors agree to Gaurav's clause, making him successful both professionally and personally. He brings back Mal and repays all of their loan. He also makes Arjun jealous by dancing with Devika in front of him.

Meanwhile, Anu Aunty announces that Arjun has joined Harvard Business School for further studies will now earn in dollars and sent a sweet box to Gaurav's mother but she replies that "Arjun is just a student and Gaurav is his teacher". In London, Arjun's class teacher invites Gaurav and Mal as their special guest and asks for a speech. They deliver the speech while mocking Arjun.

The film explores the contrast between living for oneself and conforming to societal expectations, ultimately questioning whether Gaurav's belief in pursuing his dreams will triumph over society's persistent message of 'You Can't Do It'.

== Cast ==
- Ishwak Singh as Gaurav Shukla
- Mahima Makwana as Devika
- Gaurav Pandey as Sharad Malhotra "Mal"
- Gurpreet Saini as Hardik Vaghela
- Karan Jotwani as Arjun Kapoor
- Amala Akkineni as Pooja Shukla, Gaurav's mother
- Parmeet Sethi as Investor
- Meghna Malik as Anu Kapoor "Anu Aunty", Arjun's mother
- Omkar Das Manikpuri as Birju Chaiwala
- Varun Agarwal as himself (cameo as a Harvard Business School student)

== Production ==
In May 2022, the filming of the film began. Initially, the film was titled "Bas Karo Aunty". Later, the name was changed to "Tumse Na Ho Payega" and trailer of the same was released on 13 September 2023. The film is based on Varun Agarwal's debut novel How I Braved Anu Aunty and Co-Founded a Million Dollar Company.

== Music ==
Tumse Na Ho Payega

Soundtrack album by Abhishek Arora and Ananya Purkayastha
- Released: 28 September 2023
- Genre: Feature film soundtrack
- Length: 13:04
- Language: Hindi
- Label: Zee Music Company

Official audio
- Tumse Na Ho Payega – Full Album on YouTube

The music of the film is composed by Abhishek Arora and Ananya Purkayastha while lyrics written by Kausar Munir and Puneet Sharma.

Track listing
No.	Title	Lyrics	Singer(s)	Length
1.	"Jamoore"	Kausar Munir	Vishal Dadlani	2:33
2.	"Cheenti Step"	Puneet Sharma	Abhishek Nailwal	2:30
3.	"Sifar"	Kausar Munir	Papon	4:06
4.	"Thokron Ka Shukriya"	Puneet Sharma	Varun Jain	3:55
Total length:				13:04

== Reception ==
=== Critical response ===
The film received mixed to positive reviews from critics. Dhaval Roy of The Times of India gave the film 3/5 ratings calling it, "An inspirational story about defining success on ones own term." Grace Cyrill of India Today rated the film 3/5 and quotes, "Ishwak's film will make us miss 'maa ke hath ka khana'". Deepak Gahlot of Scroll.in wrote, "A spirited cast enlivens a predictable plot."

Sonal Pandya of Times Now rated the film 2.5/5, "Bumpy Comedy Tackles Highs And Lows Of Entrepreneur’s Journey."

=== Viewership ===
Tumse Na Ho Payega garnered 4,600,000 views in its initial week of debut on Disney+ Hotstar, securing the first position among the most-watched Indian content across all streaming platforms during the same week. According to Ormax Media report of 2023, Tumse Na Ho Payega became fourth most watched Hindi film of 2023 with 14.3 million views.
