= Earthsky Pictures =

- Company type: Limited liability partnership
- Industry: Entertainment; Film production Advertising
- Founded: March 2018
- Key people: Ashwiny Iyer Tiwari; Nitesh Tiwari
- Products: Ghar Ki Murgi; Ankahi Kahaniya; Break Point; Tarla; Bawaal

Earthsky Pictures, founded in March 2018, is an Indian production company owned by filmmakers and writers, Ashwiny Iyer Tiwari and Nitesh Tiwari.

Earthsky's first film, Ghar Ki Murgi starring Sakshi Tanwar, received critical acclaim. It released on SonyLiv in 2020.

Their recent works include another film directed by Ashwiny Iyer Tiwari, in Ankahi Kahaniya, Netflix's anthology and documentary series, Break Point. The web series was released on Zee5 on 1 October 2021. The docu-series is directed by Ashwiny Iyer Tiwari and Nitesh Tiwari.

The series is based on the former Indian doubles tennis players partnership and success of Mahesh Bhupathi and Leander Paes. It garnered positive reviews from critics and audience alike.

Their recent films include Tarla starring Huma Qureshi and Sharib Hashmi and Bawaal starring Varun Dhawan and Jahnvi Kapoor. They also produce ad films. T-Series and Earthsky Pictures will be producing an upcoming musical romantic film titled Disco Star starring Ishaan Khatter and Krithi Shetty in lead roles.
