= Varun Agarwal =

Indian film maker

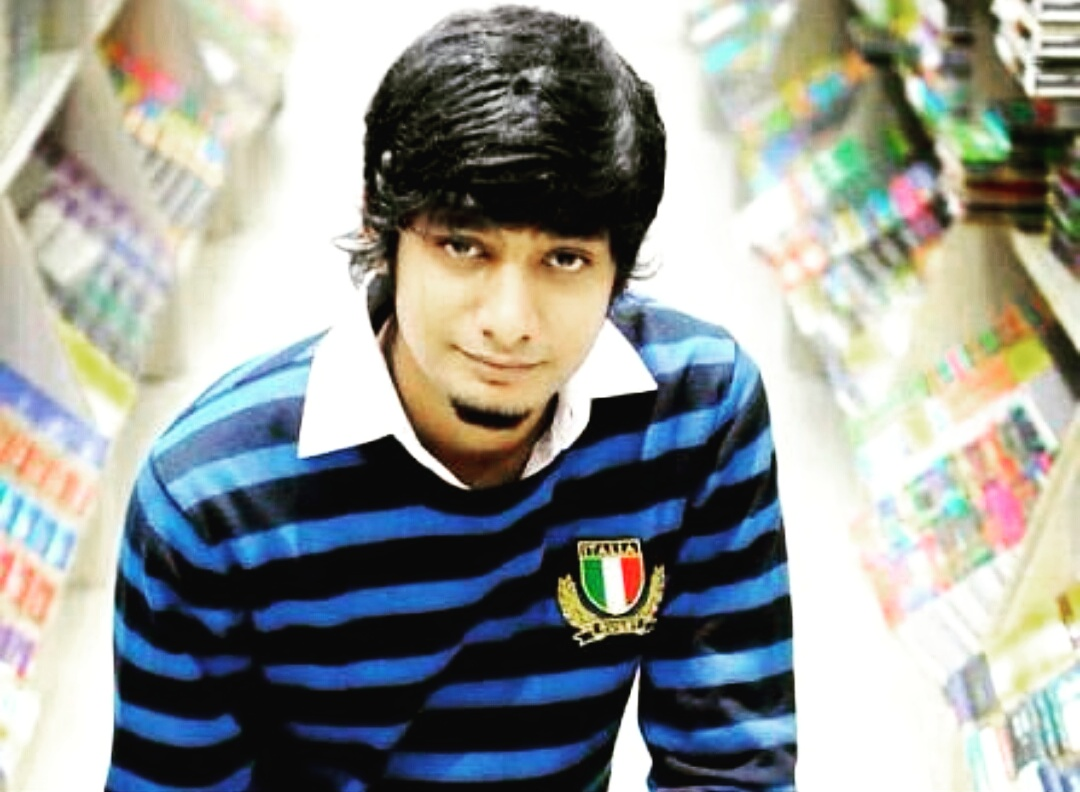
- Varun Agarwal
- Born: 6 December 1986 (age 39); Bangalore, India
- Occupations: Author, entrepreneur, film maker and investor
- Writing career
- Notable work: How I Braved Anu Aunty and Co-Founded A Million Dollar Company
- Website: varunagarwal.in

Varun Agarwal (born 6 December 1986) is an Indian entrepreneur, film maker and author. He has co-founded three companies and authored a national bestseller, How I Braved Anu Aunty and Co-Founded a Million Dollar Company.

== Early life ==
Brought up in Bangalore, Varun did his schooling from Bishop Cotton Boys' School and studied engineering at CMR Institute of Technology.

== Entrepreneur ==
Varun has co-founded three startups, Alma Mater, an online store for merchandise especially for students of colleges and schools which was started in 2009, Reticular, a social media marketing company started in 2010, and Last Minute Films, a production company for online video content which was started in 2005.

=== Alma Mater ===
Varun says that the current aim of the company is to become profitable as well as more responsible.

Alma Mater has also launched a customised online Do-It-Yourself (DIY) online T-shirt maker tool called PLAY. The user can join or create a group, make custom T-shirts with an online editing tool, share it with friends and group members and invite others to join.

=== Mento ===
Varun Agarwal also founded an online e-learning platform name Mento which is also India's first Ed-tech platform for creative courses.

== Author ==
How I Braved Anu Aunty and Co-Founded a Million Dollar Company was rolled out in 2012 by Rupa publishers and is a national bestseller. ‘How I Braved Anu Aunty & Co-founded A Million Dollar Company’ had already hit the number 5 spot on the Amazon India bestsellers list.

=== Music video ===
He has teamed up with a Bangalore-based stand-up comedian Sanjay Manaktala to make a music video called ‘Anu Aunty, Engineering Anthem’ based on his book. This video, which went viral, was featured on The Enthu Cutlets, a channel promoted by Varun in 2014 to showcase Bengaluru's comedians.

=== The Movie ===
Siddharth Roy Kapur and Ronnie Screwvala will be making a movie named Tumse Na Ho Payega, which is an adaptation of Varun's book ‘How I Braved Anu Aunty and Co-founded A Million Dollar Company’. Nitesh Tiwari, who directed the Bollywood movie Dangal, is working on this new film.

== Motivational speaker ==
Agarwal has given talks to executives at Unilever in London, college students in Pune and to employees of tobacco firm Philip Morris in Macau.
