= Leila (TV series) =

2019 Indian television series

- Poster
- Created by: Urmi Juvekar
- Based on: Leila by Prayaag Akbar
- Written by: Urmi Juvekar; Suhani Kanwar; Patrick Graham
- Directed by: Deepa Mehta; Shanker Raman; Pawan Kumar
- Starring: Huma Qureshi; Siddharth; Seema Biswas; Rahul Khanna; Sanjay Suri; Arif Zakaria; Ashwath Bhatt; Anupam Bhattacharya
- Original language: Hindi
- No. of seasons: 1
- No. of episodes: 6

Production
- Executive producers: Deepa Mehta; Urmi Juvekar
- Producers: Priya Sreedharan; Wasim Khan; Zulfaquar Torabi; Vibhav Shikdar
- Production location: India
- Cinematography: Johan Heurlin Aidt
- Editors: Arindam Ghatak; Meghna Manchanda Sen; Shan Mohd
- Production company: Open Air Films LLP

Original release
- Network: Netflix
- Release: 14 June 2019

Leila is an Indian Hindi-language dystopian drama series directed by Deepa Mehta, Shanker Raman and Pawan Kumar. Based on the 2017 eponymous novel by Prayaag Akbar, Leila follows the story of Shalini, who tries to find her missing daughter in a totalitarian regime in the near future. Written by Urmi Juvekar, it stars Huma Qureshi, Siddharth, Rahul Khanna, Sanjay Suri and Arif Zakaria. A teaser was launched on 8 March. The six-episode series premiered on 14 June 2019 on Netflix.

== Cast ==
- Huma Qureshi as Shalini
- Siddharth as Bhanu
- Leysha Mange as Leila
- Seema Biswas as Madhu
- Rahul Khanna as Rizwan Chaudhary
- Sanjay Suri as Joshiji
- Arif Zakaria as Guru Ma
- Ashwath Bhatt as Mr. Dixit
- Indu Sharma as Mrs. Dixit
- Pallavi Batra as Kanika
- Anupam Bhattacharya as Mohan
- Akash Khurana as Mr. Rao
- Jagjeet Sandhu as Rakesh
- Prasanna Soni as Ashish
- Neha Mahajan as Pooja
- Adarsh Gourav as Naz Chaudhary

== Production ==
In February 2018, Netflix announced that an original series will be made on the dystopian fiction novel Leila by Prayaag Akbar, with Urmi Juvekar serving as the writer and executive producer. In November, it was announced that Deepa Mehta along with Pawan Kumar and Shanker Raman, will be directing the series. To prepare for the role of Shalini, Qureshi went through physical training. The principal photography of Leila began in October 2018 in Delhi. It was finished in February 2019.

== Episodes ==
=== Season 1 ===
No. overall	No. in season	Title	Original release date
1	1	"Episode 1"	14 June 2019
In the late 2040s, the nation of Aryavarta is governed by Dr. Joshi. The nation is divided into communities separated by high walls and is subject to strict segregation. Water and clean air have become luxuries. Shalini, along with her husband Rizwan Chaudhary, lives peacefully with their daughter Leila. One day, when swimming in their private pool, they are attacked by goons who accuse them of wasting water in the form of their swimming pool. They kill Rizwaan and kidnap Shalini in front of terrified Leila. Shalini is sent to a "re-education center" or reprimand house to live with several other women who are accused of "sinning" or being somehow defiled. Treated as slaves and all dressed in red, they are also drugged on a daily basis. A few are chosen to take the purity test, which will supposedly allow them to go back home, but if they fail, they will be sent to a labor camp and never see their families again. Shalini finds out from another girl (Pooja) that a new law has been passed; any kids from mixed parentage are taken away by the government. Since her husband was a Muslim, she now worries that her daughter Leila is in danger. We then see this new law in action as Kanika’s baby is being tested for purity. The results show that she is of mixed blood so the guards put her in a cage, ready to be taken away. Kanika, warned by Shalini, tries to save her baby but is quickly knocked out by the guards. This causes both of them to be punished for their actions. Kanika is made to marry a dog while Shalini is forbidden from taking part in the purity test. Desperate to leave the house, she reveals to the leader Guru Ma that Pooja did not undergo an abortion by Dr. Renu who is a slave as well as initially decided. This betrayal allows her to take the test. The day of the test finds Shalini faced a difficult choice; to be able to succeed she has to press a button which will kill the "traitors" Pooja and Renu. Unable to bring herself to perform this task, she fails the test and is sent to the labor camp. As she enters the bus, she is quickly told to sit somewhere else as being a category 5; she can only sit in certain seats. On their way to the camp, we see how poor and desperate for water people are. The bus gets toppled by protestors and rioters looking for water, which gives Shalini a chance to escape. However, the guard, Bhanu (Siddharth), spots which direction she’s run off in and chases after her.
2	2	"Episode 2"	14 June 2019
In a bid to escape, she winds up in a room with caged children where she saves a little girl called Roop. She takes a liking to her as she reminds her of her daughter and promises to give Roop money if she helps her reach the highway. From here, we then find out about Roop’s back story where we learn she was on her way to see her uncle when Roop and her brother were caught and sold into slavery. Roop now wants to find her brother and buy him back, which she plans to do with the money Shalini has promised her once she returns home. They then make their way through rubbish-littered dumps but are seen by Bhanu, who hasn’t given up his chase. As he runs after them, we flashback to Shalini and her family watching the news of the Taj Mahal being destroyed. Her brother-in-law Naz exclaims that walls should be built to protect them, which causes disagreement and discord with his brother. The couple explains that they have decided to move to the East End, which is where we cut back to the present day. Shalini and Roop struggle to go through the gates to reach the highway where they’re sadly separated. Roop gets taken away by soldiers for trying to desecrate a statue of Joshi while Shalini begrudgingly presses on, eventually making it to her in-laws' house where she hopes to find Leila. She finds her in-laws who tell her that her husband is dead and they don’t know where Leila is. She’s also reunited with her brother-in-law Naz who is not happy to see her. He confronts her, blaming her for her current predicament. After telling her she’s not part of the family anymore, she hears an ominous knock at the door; Bhanu, having been previously tipped off by Naz, arrives to take her away to the labor camp. Her mother-in-law hugs her goodbye but not before telling her to remember Project Balee when she goes looking for Leila. As she reaches the labor camp, Shalini finally has time to grieve the loss of Roop. The episode then ends with her looking out the window and seeing firsthand the contrast between the rich and poor divide of the country.
3	3	"Episode 3"	14 June 2019
Back in Tower 51 where Shalini lives in the labor camp, she relays her findings to her friend Madhu. She explains that she wants to find the writer of an article about missing children and Project Balee, and having listened to her pleas, Madhu agrees to help her. The next day, she begins her new job; she’s assigned as a maid to a privileged family called the Dixit's. While we find out that Mr. Dixit is one of the engineers for the upcoming Skydome, we also see that the presence of Joshi is everywhere in the household and they’re brainwashing their child into following the new leader’s doctrines. Later that night, Madhu wakes Shalini up and tells her she has found the reporter. He works in the gas plant and she tells her that if she fits a camera in Dixit’s room, she will be taken to the reporter. Madhu explains that Dixit is involved in a dangerous conspiracy and they need to find out more. The next day, as Shalini goes to work with the camera hidden in her lunch, she watches Mr. Dixit’s presentation about the Skydome which will make sure there is clean water for everyone and no pollution. Pinching the child until he begins crying, Shalini garners up a good distraction in order to sneak the camera into Dixit’s office. After intercepting a package at the local mall, Shalini uses the computer in the house and finds out that the reporter is dead. A menacing Mr. Shrivastava arrives and tells Mrs. Dixit that there’s still a lot of preparation left before the inauguration of the Skydome but reveals there’s also a lot of enemies to deal with. As her husband is suddenly taken away, Mrs. Dixit starts to panic; she worries that she may lose her son. We find out that the child is not hers and that she bought him because she was unable to conceive. In a cruel sense of irony, he’s a mixed-race child and Shalini finds out that mixed children are being sold. Feeling sorry for her, Shalini decides to help and takes her to Bhanu who extracts the chip from Mrs. Dixit’s wrist and helps her getaway. The episode then ends on a cliff-hanger as Bhanu points a gun at Shalini’s head and tells her he needs to kill her as she knows too much.
4	4	"Episode 4"	14 June 2019
Shalini pleads for her life and explains that she was only trying to help. She mentions that she has a package from Mr. Dixit and in a bid to try and distract him, throws sand in Bhanu’s face and drives away. As she reaches the fertility clinic to find out more about her daughter, she sees a poster showing one of the fertility doctors who she recognizes as one of the men who came to kill her husband and kidnap Leila. Bhanu questions her about the package and she tells him that if he takes her to the clinic first thing tomorrow, she will give it to him. Back at the camp, Madhu congratulates Shalini for her help catching Mr. Dixit. She then asks to be given Madhu’s job so she can get into the clinic in the morning. As sirens and soldiers wake the labor camp residents, they find incriminating evidence under Madhu’s bed and she gets sent to a construction site where she will now work. The next day, Shalini gets assigned to a different job, this time in Rao’s mansion for 7 days. She later purposely drops tea on Rao which gets her fired. Bhanu takes her away but they are both later stopped by the police before being shown footage of when they helped Mrs. Dixit escape. They ask her who the man in the video is but Shalini lies, telling them she doesn’t know. We then see a news report showing an assassination attempt on Joshi by Dixit. As he was involved in a conspiration, we could assume that Dixit was framed for this crime. After they are released, Shalini finally gives Bhanu the package which contains a video of Dixit explaining that the Skydome will be like a giant air conditioner with vents blowing hot air outside of it, with power the equivalent of 500 jets taking off at the same time. This will then cause a terrible fire outside and obliterate all of Unnati. In the morning, Bhanu takes her to the clinic where she meets with Dr. Rakesh who tells her he can get her any child she wishes for, but it will be a mixed child. She then describes her own daughter which prompts him to show her a video of children in cages before we finally see Roop again. Shalini hastily chooses her but she has already been sold. He admits to her that he is the head of the repeaters and has a list with all the mixed-blood children on it. After creating a diversion, she manages to check his computer to look for the whereabouts of her daughter. Sadly, she discovers that she is deceased, causing her to attack Dr. Rakesh and be taken back to Guru Ma.
5	5	"Episode 5"	14 June 2019
Bhanu and another man takes a dead body to the dumps, which is of Dr. Rakesh's. A trial for Shalini’s crime is being held but Guru tells her she is now beyond purification. He later meets with Bhanu with a message from Rao saying he wants Shalini back and although reluctant at first, Bhanu convinces Guru to let her go back to Rao. Bhanu then tells Shalini that there is a resistance and that the Dixit's were publicly executed. They want the plans to the dome and in exchange, he will find out what happened to her daughter. More importantly, though, he’ll check to see if she’s still alive. He gives her instructions; she must get the plans from Rao’s computer. He also tells her that it was her brother-in-law Naz who sent the repeaters to her house, which led to the death of Riz. Shalini then goes and sees Naz, questioning him over what he’s done but he tells her again, with no remorse, that it was all her fault. He then sounds an alarm while she asks him about Leila, and Shalini gets a hint that Leila could be alive. Bhanu arrives just in time and takes her away before the authorities can arrive. Cunningly, she then puts a GPS tracker on Naz’s scooter in a bid to find out where Leila may be. Shalini tries to get close to Rao. Bhanu and Shalini then decide on a new plan, involving taking photos of the files. From the GPS, she sees that Naz has moved to a school, which indicates that Leila might be there. Against Bhanu's wishes, she makes her way to the school and sees her daughter safe and sound but being brainwashed into becoming a young soldier of Aryavarta.
6	6	"Episode 6"	14 June 2019
Leila doesn't recognize Shalini. She is also being raised by Shalini’s former maid. Seeing her daughter again prompts her to decide to attend the Skydome function as her daughter will be performing there. She’ll use this opportunity to attempt a rescue. Back at Rao’s house, Shalini tries to photograph the plans but is caught by Mohan. In a bid to distract everyone, she manages to turn the electricity of which allows her to finally take the pictures of the Skydome’s plans. She is confronted again by Mohan but her old maid’s husband convinces him that she is innocent. Bhanu receives the pictures and realizes that it will be difficult to get in as the security will be very tight. The only solution would be to get someone on the guest list. Shalini then meets with Rao and gives him an audio spool she took earlier of his favorite poem. He asks her why and how she managed to get this as it’s now illegal to which she replies that she needs to get into the Skydome function as her daughter will be performing there. He decides to help her as he’s not happy with Joshi’s new order. She also asks Bhanu for a passport and a car but instead, he gives her a light bulb containing a deadly poisonous gas to take to the function. He convinces her to take it in but not before making him promise that no harm will come of Leila. Rao gives Shalini a script to read to the function, planning a coup in a bid to rule over Joshi. With the wheels set into motion, the day of the inauguration arrives and Shalini has hidden the light bulb inside Rao’s lunch. As Joshi arrives, the children perform for the audience. Joshi then asks one of the children, which happens to be Leila, to stay with him. After Rao's speech, Shalini goes up to Joshi and threatens to release the poisonous gas. He smiles, telling her she must do what she came here to do. She replies that she wants her life and her daughter back. He tells Leila to go to her mother, but she replies that Aryavarta is her mother and runs to Sapna, the maid. The episode then ends with Joshi telling her that no one can defeat Aryavarta while Shalini looks ready to break the light bulb.

== Reception ==
Rohan Naahar of Hindustan Times gave the show a 4/5 and said of it "What the show cannot achieve in terms of streamlined storytelling, it more than makes up for with the sheer audacity of its ideas, and for having the bravery of following through on them." He also said that the show's YouTube trailer was dislike bombed by individuals calling the show "Hinduphobic".

Soumya Rao of Scroll.in said that "In [the] Netflix series, the future isn’t very different from the present" and elaborated that "Although Leila is set in the distant future, there are unmistakable allusions to the present. Dissenters are branded as traitors, intellectuals are attacked and the Repeaters have unchecked powers."

Hiba Bég of The Quint rated the show a 4/5 and said "'Leila' Is a Show That Will Force You to Re-Think Everything".
