= Single Salma =

2025 Indian Comedy film

- Theatrical release poster
- Directed by: Nachiket Samant
- Written by: Mudassar Aziz; Amina Khan; Ravi Kumar
- Produced by: Ajit Andhare; Alok Jain; Firuzi Khan; Huma Qureshi; Saqib Saleem
- Starring: Huma Qureshi; Sunny Singh; Shreyas Talpade
- Cinematography: Andrew Boulter
- Edited by: Abhishek Anand; Ashish Tripathi
- Music by: Sohail Sen; Jassi Sindhu
- Production companies: Star Studio18; Elemen3 Entertainment
- Distributed by: Star Studio18
- Release date: 31 October 2025
- Running time: 139 minutes
- Country: India
- Language: Hindi

Single Salma is a 2025 Indian Hindi-language romantic comedy film directed by Nachiket Samant. It stars Huma Qureshi, Sunny Singh and Shreyas Talpade in the lead role.

It was released theatrically on 31 October 2025.

== Premise ==
A woman from Lucknow, India, who has dedicated her life to supporting her family, continues to be identified as single and “unsettled” due to being unmarried.

== Cast ==
- Huma Qureshi as Salma Rizvi
- Sunny Singh as Meet Singh Sahni
- Shreyas Talpade as Sikander Khan
- Lauren Gottlieb as Zoya
- Kanwaljit Singh as Nawab Saahab, Salma's father
- Nidhi Singh as Ratna
- Kal Sabir
- Sammy Jonas Heaney
- Sachin Kavetham
- Navni Parihar as Mrs. Srivastav

== Music ==
The music of this film was composed by Sohail Sen and Jassi Sindhu.

== Release ==
The film was released on 31 October 2025.

== Reception ==
Single Salma mostly received negative reviews from critics.

Deepa Gahlot of Rediff.com rated it 2.5/5 stars and said that "It's good to see Huma Qureshi help create a film which is as charming as it is empowering, without taking on the stridency that so many women-oriented films invariably adopt. Ronak Kotecha of The Times of India gave 3 stars out of 5 and said that, "Watch it if you enjoy simple, slice-of-life dramas with heart. Skip it if you’re seeking surprises or cinematic fireworks." Nandini Ramnath of Scroll.in observed that "Apart from the sheer unusualness of featuring leading Muslim characters, Single Salma has a few surprises in store. Not all of these land well because of the 142-minute movie’s tendency towards bloat and speechifying. But there are neat upending of expectations, welcome fun poked at the Indian obsession with marriage."

Bollywood Hungama rated it 1.5/5 stars and stated that "On the whole, SINGLE SALMA makes an important comment but falls flat due to the slow-moving narrative and an unimpressive climax." Ganesh Aaglave of Firstpost gave 1.5 stars out of 5 and said that "Touted to be a family-entertainer, Single Salma turns out to be a colossal disappointment." Shreyas Pande of Cinema Express also gave 1.5 stars out of 5 and said that "the film is just not as sharp-witted or warm to make for an effective experience."

Sana Farzeen of India Today rated it 1.5/5 stars and said that "'Single Salma' explores a woman's journey to self-discovery amid societal and family pressures. The film's important message is weakened by slow pacing and inconsistent storytelling." Satish Sundaresan of Free Press Journal gave 2.5 stars out of 5 and said that "Given the fact that the film ‘Single Salma’ does not have an extremely strong narrative or chartbuster music, it will find it tough to sustain itself at the box-office. Even the word of mouth is seemingly difficult." Devesh Sharma of Filmfare rated it 2.5/5 stars and said that "Single Salma is a coming-of-age film about a Muslim girl who discovers there is more to life than getting married. It espouses self-love and independence."
