= Nicolas Barreau =

Pseudonymous Franco-German author

Nicolas Barreau is a pseudonymous Franco-German author who works in the publishing world. He studied Romance languages and literature at the Sorbonne and worked in a bookshop on the Rive Gauche in Paris. He has written several bestsellers:

- Le Sourire des femmes
- Tu me trouveras au bout du monde
- La Vie en Rosalie
- Un soir a Paris
- Menu d'amour

In 2017, Menu d'amour was adapted into the Hindi film Bareilly Ki Barfi.
