= Tarla =

2023 film by Piyush Gupta

- Official release poster
- Directed by: Piyush Gupta
- Written by: Piyush Gupta; Gautam Ved
- Produced by: Ronnie Screwvala; Ashwiny Iyer Tiwari; Nitesh Tiwari
- Starring: Huma Qureshi; Sharib Hashmi
- Cinematography: Salu K. Thomas
- Edited by: Gaurav Aggarwal
- Music by: Nilotpal Bora; Suhit Abhyankar; Rohan Vinayak
- Production companies: RSVP Movies; Earthsky
- Distributed by: ZEE5
- Release date: 7 July 2023
- Running time: 127 minutes
- Country: India
- Language: Hindi

Tarla is a 2023 Indian Hindi-language biopic on Indian chef and cookbook author Tarla Dalal. It features Huma Qureshi in the titular role. The film has been directed by Piyush Gupta and produced by Ronnie Screwvala, Ashwiny Iyer Tiwari and Nitesh Tiwari. The film was released on ZEE5.

== Plot ==
Tarla is a woman who wants to achieve something significant in life but her family insists on getting her married. Although Tarla's husband, Nalin, supports her choices, gender roles cause her to put her ambitions aside. Despite being a pure vegetarian, Nalin's extreme liking for non-vegetarian food is a matter of surprise.

She started preparing vegetarian food that followed non-vegetarian food items and gave them a run for their money. After teaching her neighbour's kid to cook, she started giving cooking classes. Tarla's cooking class empowers woman of her community to stand up for their dreams and became a source of inspiration for woman across India.

== Cast ==
- Huma Qureshi as Tarla Dalal
- Sharib Hashmi as Nalin Dalal
- Bharati Achrekar as Jaishree aunty, Tarla's neighbor
- Bhawana Somaaya as Tarla's professor
- Amarjeet Singh as Gafur
- Rajeev Pandey as Makrand
- Purnendu Bhattacharya as Paragaon Textile CEO
- Veenah Naair as Renuka

== Production ==
The principal photography began in April 2022. Most of the film was shot in Mumbai. The shoots were wrapped up by June 2022.

== Soundtrack ==
Tarla

Soundtrack album by Nilotpal Bora, Suhit Abhyankar and Rohan Vinayak
- Released: 1 July 2023
- Genre: Feature film soundtrack
- Length: 17:02
- Label: Zee Music Company

The music is composed by Nilotpal Bora, Suhit Abhyankar and Rohan Vinayak. Lyrics penned by Suhit Abhyankar, Hussain Haidry, Shreyas Jain and Manoj Yadav.

No.	Title	Lyrics	Music	Singer(s)	Length
1.	"Rang Khilein"	Hussain Haidry	Nilotpal Bora	Nilotpal Bora	3:32
2.	"Tina Nana Nina (Tarla's Theme)"	Suhit Abhyankar	Suhit Abhyankar	Suhit Abhyankar	1:50
3.	"Papa Why?"	Shreyas Jain	Rohan Vinayak	Atanu Mishra	2:20
4.	"Yahi Toh Hai Zindagi"	Suhit Abhyankar	Suhit Abhyankar	Suhit Abhyankar	3:15
5.	"Rahe Na Kyun"	Manoj Yadav	Suhit Abhyankar	Suhit Abhyankar	2:50
6.	"Rahe Na Kyun (Female Version)"	Manoj Yadav	Suhit Abhyankar	Rekha Bhardwaj	3:15
Total length:					17:02

== Reception ==
The film received mixed responses from critics. Saibal Chatterjee of NDTV wrote, "Tarla works especially well as an understated drama about a woman negotiating her space at home and in the world." The Times of India while rating it 3.5 out of 5, commented, "'Tarla' serves up a decent cinematic treat, reminding us of the power of pursuing our passions and breaking free from societal constraints." Nandini Ramnath, writing for Scroll.in wrote, "Nearly every scene is about food – its making, its reception, its importance in the grand scheme of things."

Shubhra Gupta of The Indian Express criticised the film, calling it "but never quite as flavourful". The Hindu wrote, "The film also fails to unlock the persona of Tarla in a satisfying manner."
