= Ankahi Kahaniya =

- Official release poster
- Directed by: Abhishek Chaubey; Saket Chaudhary; Ashwiny Iyer Tiwari
- Written by: Piyush Gupta; Hussain Haidry; Shreyas Jain; Zeenat Lakhani; Nitesh Tiwari
- Produced by: Ronnie Screwvala; Ashi Dya
- Starring: Abhishek Banerjee; Rinku Rajguru; Delzad Hiwale; Kunal Kapoor; Zoya Hussain; Nikhil Dwivedi; Palomi Ghosh
- Cinematography: Eeshit Narain; Sylvester Fonseca; Avinash Arun
- Edited by: Sanyukta Kaza; Kamlesh Parui; Charu Shree Roy
- Music by: Achint Thakkar
- Production companies: RSVP Movies; Flying Unicorn Entertainment; Earthsky Pictures; MacGuffin Pictures; Slugline Films
- Distributed by: Netflix
- Release date: 17 September 2021
- Running time: 110 minutes
- Country: India
- Language: Hindi

Ankahi Kahaniya (transl. Untold Stories) is a 2021 Indian Hindi-language anthology film directed by Abhishek Chaubey, Saket Chaudhary and Ashwiny Iyer Tiwari, written by Piyush Gupta, Hussain Haidry, Shreyas Jain, Zeenat Lakhani and Nitesh Tiwari and starring Abhishek Banerjee, Rinku Rajguru, Delzad Hiwale, Kunal Kapoor, Zoya Hussain, Nikhil Dwivedi and Palomi Ghosh. It was released by Netflix on 17 September 2021 to mixed reviews.

== Cast ==
- Abhishek Banerjee as Pradeep Loharia
- Rinku Rajguru as Manjari
- Delzad Hiwale as Nandu
- Kunal Kapoor as Manav
- Zoya Hussain as Tanu Mathur
- Nikhil Dwivedi as Arjun Mathur
- Palomi Ghosh as Natasha
- TJ Bhanu as Pradeep Loharia's wife

== Reception ==
On the review aggregator website Rotten Tomatoes, 55% of 11 critics' reviews are positive, with an average rating of 5.2/10.

A critic from The Times of India rated the film 3.5/5 out of 5 and wrote, "All these diverse stories essentially focus on similar emotions: loneliness, love, pain, and above all, hope. To sum it up, ‘Ankahi Kahaniya' is an enjoyable and insightful watch". A critic from The Indian Express rated the film 2/5 and wrote, "The anthology was supposed to take us into the not-so-glamorous world of heartbreak, and a life beyond rose tinted glasses. Ankahi Kahaniyan evokes no emotion, none at all".
