= Leila (novel) =

2017 novel by Prayaag Akbar

- First edition cover
- Author: Prayaag Akbar
- Language: English
- Genre: Fiction; Drama
- Publisher: Simon & Schuster (India)
- Publication date: 2017
- Publication place: India
- Media type: Print (paperback, hardback)
- Pages: 207
- ISBN: 978-0-571-34133-7

Leila is a 2017 Indian dystopian novel written by Prayaag Akbar. Set in the 2040s, the story follows Shalini, who tries to find her missing daughter Leila in a totalitarian regime. It was published by Simon & Schuster in several formats worldwide on 20 April 2017 and received positive critical reception. It is also available as an audiobook narrated by Tania Rodriguez.

The novel was awarded the 2018 juried Crossword Book Award for fiction and the Tata Literature Live First Book Award the same year. It was also shortlisted for The Hindu Literary Prize. Leila was adapted as a Netflix series by Deepa Mehta, Shanker Raman and Pawan Kumar with Huma Qureshi, Siddharth, Rahul Khanna, Sanjay Suri and Arif Zakaria. The series premiered on 14 June 2019 to mostly positive reviews from critics.

== Plot ==
The novel depicts a near- future society governed by totalitarian council. In the late 2040s, drinking water and fresh air are luxuries. India is ruled by The Council. Shalini is married to Rizwan Chaudhury, a Muslim man with whom she has a daughter, Leila. One day Rizwan is abducted and killed by goons known as "Repeaters" in an attempt to cleanse the bloodlines and stop inter-faith marriages. Her daughter Leila is also abducted. Shalini is sent to a Purity Camp where she serves as a slave for sixteen years to reform her identity and enforce obedience. She endures violence and psychological torture due to which her mental health starts deteriorating. One day she escapes. She is later caught and sent back to the camp where she is appointed as a housekeeper to the Dixits, an advantaged family at the Record Towers. Mr. Dixit is one of the designers for the up-and-coming Skydome, which will be utilized to make fresh air.

Shalini gains access to the tower through the bureaucracy, to get more information. Mr. Dixit is sent to the camp after he neglects to make the arch by the due date. Feeling for Mrs. Dixit, Shalini helps her escape. One day, Shalini gets into the wealthy facility to find answers concerning the whereabouts of her missing girl. She sees a blurb demonstrating one of the specialists she thinks is one of the men who came to kill her husband and kidnap Leila. Shalini sees a video of Dixit clarifying that the Skydome will resemble a climate control system with vents blowing tourists outside of it that can murder individuals outside of it.

While checking for the whereabouts of her daughter, Shalini stumbles on a file of all the children in the country. She notices Leila's picture and her school. Shalini visits the school and sees a little girl free from any danger yet being brainwashed into being a blind follower. Shalini thinks of her as Leila. The girl does not recognize Shalini. A politician, Mr. Rao, tells Shalini to get inside the facility, switch off the power, and take photos of the Skydome's arrangements.

Shalini performs the task and then meets with Rao and gives him the film reel she took before of his preferred sonnet. Rao helps Shalini get into the Skydome work as her daughter will perform there. He gives Shalini content to peruse to the capacity, arranging an upset in an offer to govern over Joshi. Shalini shrouds the light inside Rao's lunch. As Joshi arrives, the youngsters perform for the group of spectators. Joshi then solicits one of the kids, which happens to be Leila, to remain with him. Shalini leaves the building and, standing outside, stares up at the girl she thinks is Leila. Shalini feels like the girl is calling out to her but is never sure whether it is real or her imagination.

== Development ==
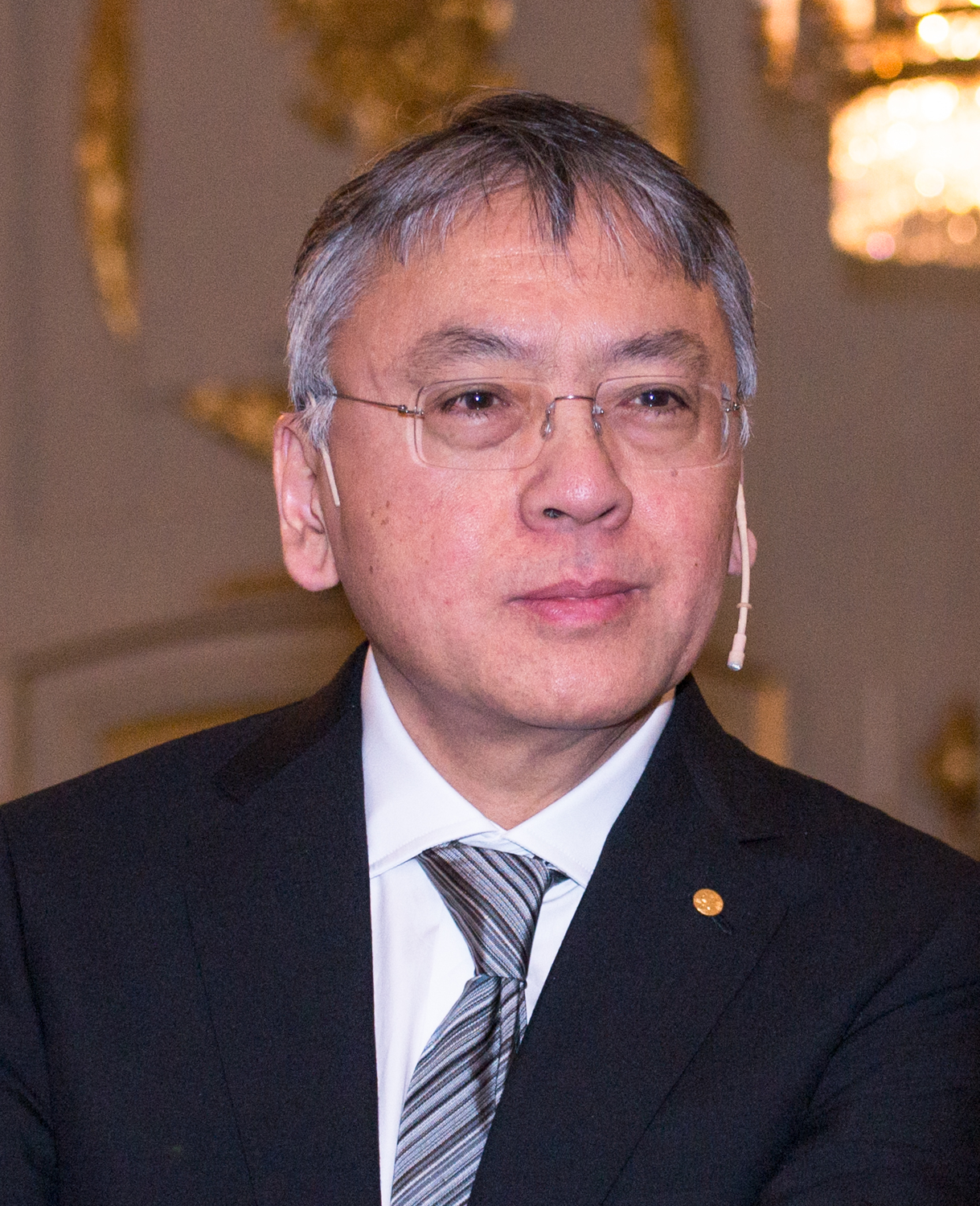
Kazuo Ishiguro's writing influenced Akbar to write the story from a female perspective.

Akbar had wanted to write since his childhood and retire as a journalist to pursue a writing career. He wanted to depict the political changes that can "have a devastating impact on people's lives" by humanising the impact. He said that he was drawn by the "isolated, insular experience" of cities like Delhi and Mumbai: "In today's India, there are forces at work which are beyond our immediate control. There are huge, overarching political changes that can have personal ramifications, and can go on to devastate lives." He started writing with the idea of a mother and a daughter being separated.

After reading Kazuo Ishiguro's 1982 novel A Pale View of Hills, Akbar wanted to write a story from a women's perspective as it made him realise that a male writer could write well in a woman's voice. Akbar began writing the story with Shalini and her daughter while the elements of dystopia came later on. Akbar felt that in India, it is always important to ascribe the "minute identities of caste and subcaste to each other." He said this experience inspired the setting of the novel.

The novel was written over the course of five years. Akbar said that he deliberately chose "Leila" as the main character's name as it is both a Muslim and a Christian name. He wanted to show that "people also exist between the [religion] space." Leila was published by Simon & Schuster on 20 April 2017 in various formats. The audiobook version, narrated by Tania Rodriguez, was released on 4 April 2019.

== Reception ==
Writing for The Economic Times, Lopamudra Ghatak described the novel as "stark" and Shalini's pain "at her loss and longing" ... "evocative". Minakshi Raja of The Free Press Journal described the book as "well worth a read" but felt the ending was conventional. Karishma Kuenzang of India Today said that the book is "intriguing enough to keep you hooked till the last page". She also compared it to Amitav Ghosh's The Shadow Lines, which was based on a similar theme. Ananya Borgohain of The Pioneer praised the novel saying it is "fascinatingly surreal and social at the same time."

A review published by The Telegraph pointed that the resemblance between the reality and the "horrific world that Akbar conjures up is striking." Aditya Mani Jha of The Hindu Business Line compared the mother-daughter bond with that in Cormac McCarthy's The Road. Rini Burman of The Indian Express wrote: "Prayaag Akbar conjures up a future society, the inner seams of which reflect rigid class and caste divisions — almost eerie echoes of the reality we are living out now." Keshava Guha of The Hindu called it a "gripping debut novel that is a dystopian work that speaks directly to the ongoing changes in India's politics and society." Nandini Krishnan of The Wire praised the writing and said that the world of the novel is "not frightening so much as credible."

Avantika Mehta of Hindustan Times described the novel as a "powerful debut" that "knocks you sideways with its complex questions." Bhanuj Kappal of The National described the writing as "tight and unrelenting" that never lets the reader's attention drift. Trisha Gupta of Scroll.in felt the future shown in the novel is "really already here." Somak Ghoshal of HuffPost praised the novel and noted the mother-daughter relationship as the highlight.

Nudrat Kamal of Dawn called the prose "engaging" and said the "narrative tension of Shalini's increasingly desperate attempts to reunite with her daughter keeps the reader in its thrall." Aditya Singh of The Millions felt the novel was a "political and social allegory" with a "powerful commentary on the inherently unstable foundations that India's societal setup rests upon." Roger Cox of The Scotsman called the novel timely and memorable saying it "takes "xenophobic small-mindedness to its chilling conclusion." Kerryn Goldsworthy of The Sydney Morning Herald noted that Akbar successfully "create(s) a society in which everyone must be labelled by categories and sub-categories of race, religion and family, and movements around the city are strictly monitored."

Akbar was awarded the juried Crossword Book Award for fiction. He also won the Tata Literature Live First Book Award. It was also shortlisted for The Hindu Literary Prize.

== Adaptation ==
In February 2018, Netflix announced it was commissioning an original series based on the novel. Produced by Deepa Mehta, it starred Huma Qureshi, Siddharth, Rahul Khanna, Sanjay Suri and Arif Zakaria. Directed by Mehta, Shanker Raman and Pawan Kumar, the series began filming in November 2018 and finished in April 2019. It premiered on 14 June 2019 to mostly positive reviews from critics.
