= Bareilly Ki Barfi =

2017 film directed by Ashwiny Iyer Tiwari

- Directed by: Ashwiny Iyer Tiwari
- Screenplay by: Nitesh Tiwari; Shreyas Jain
- Story by: Nicolas Barreau
- Based on: The Ingredients of Love by Nicolas Barreau
- Produced by: Vineet Jain; Renu Ravi Chopra
- Starring: Ayushmann Khurrana; Kriti Sanon; Rajkummar Rao
- Narrated by: Javed Akhtar
- Cinematography: Gavemic U. Ary
- Edited by: Chandrashekhar Prajapati
- Music by: Songs: Tanishk Bagchi; Arko; Samira Koppikar; Vayu; Sameer Uddin; Score: Sameer Uddin
- Production companies: Junglee Pictures; B R Studios
- Distributed by: AA Films; Pen Marudhar(re-release)
- Release date: 18 August 2017
- Running time: 116 minutes
- Country: India
- Language: Hindi
- Budget: ₹20 crore
- Box office: est. ₹58.75 crore

Bareilly Ki Barfi (transl. Bareilly's Barfi) is a 2017 Indian Hindi-language romantic comedy-drama film directed by Ashwiny Iyer Tiwari. It is based on Nicolas Barreau's novel, The Ingredients of Love. The film stars Ayushmann Khurrana, Kriti Sanon and Rajkummar Rao in lead roles, with Pankaj Tripathi and Seema Pahwa in supporting roles. It was theatrically released in India on 18 August 2017, coinciding with Independence Day weekend, and received widespread positive critical acclaim upon release, with major praise directed towards Rao's performance. It emerged as a commercial success at the box-office, grossing over ₹60 crore (US$6.3 million) worldwide against a budget of ₹20 crore (US$2.1 million), running for more than 70 days in both India and abroad.

At the 63rd Filmfare Awards, Bareilly Ki Barfi received 8 nominations, including Best Film and Best Supporting Actress (Pahwa), winning Best Director (Iyer Tiwari) and Best Supporting Actor (Rao).

== Plot ==
Bitti Mishra, a tomboyish girl in Bareilly, runs away from home after yet another failed attempt at arranged marriage. While waiting for a train, she buys and reads a book, Bareilly Ki Barfi, and realises to her shock that she is Barfi, the eponymous main character. She returns home and decides to track down the author, mentioned on the back cover as 'Pritam Vidrohi', happy and hopeful about the fact that there exists someone who could love her the way she is. The bookshop owner directs her to Chirag Dubey, a young man who owns the printing press where the book was published. He informs her that Vidrohi does not live in town any more. He agrees to be a messenger for Bitti, delivering her letters to Vidrohi and bringing back his replies.

Bitti, however, is unaware of the fact that Chirag is the book's original author, having written it five years ago after his ex-girlfriend, Babli (the Barfi of the novel) married someone else. 'Vidrohi' is the name of a friend, used by Chirag as an alias to publish his novel. Since Bitti thinks herself to be Barfi, Chirag intends to find out if she is indeed like his ex-girlfriend, a coincidence that might give him a second chance at love.

Bitti and Chirag become close friends but she still longs to meet the author Vidrohi, who has been sending replies to her letters. Unwilling to do away with the charade just yet, he arranges for Bitti to meet the real Vidrohi. He goes to Lucknow and brings back his friend, Pritam Vidrohi, who had left town soon after the novel had been published. Bitti is initially shocked at the ruffian-like behaviour of Vidrohi (a ruse, intended as part of Chirag's plan), having imagined him in a different light from having read his letters. Soon though, she seems to grow fond of him, believing him to be misunderstood by society much like herself. Chirag, who had planned for Pritam to exit the scene after driving Bitti away, is now forced to malign him so that Bitti's parents don't see him as a worthy suitor for her. He lies that Pritam has had a failed marriage. This does not faze Bitti at all, but ends up spoiling the deal for Bitti's friend Rama, who had grown to like Pritam.

Pritam, who liked Rama back, now revolts against the manipulative Chirag and refuses to put an end to the whole charade. Soon, Bitti and Pritam announce their engagement, leading Chirag to resign to the fact that he will lose his love once again. On the eve of the event, he writes a final, heartfelt letter to Bitti using his Vidrohi alias. He gives the letter to Pritam to read at the ceremony, but ends up having to read it himself to Bitti when Pritam complains of a sore throat. This becomes the turning point for Bitti to reveal that she had known for some time that Chirag was the real author, and that Pritam had agreed to play along so that Bitti could find out whether Chirag was really in love with her (or only at the idea of her being an image of his ex-girlfriend). Finally, Chirag and Pritam both marry their chosen partners, Bitti and Rama respectively, and lead happily married lives in Bareilly.

== Cast ==
- Kriti Sanon as Bitti Mishra: An independent woman who does not believe in following a patriarchal society's rules, she falls for the writer of a book and wants to meet him eagerly.
- Ayushmann Khurrana as Chirag Dubey: A sweet but sometimes selfish writer who falls in love with Bitti and writes her letters. He uses Pritam to get to Bitti but later apologises.
- Rajkummar Rao as Pritam Vidrohi: An innocent salesman and Bitti's love-interest who falls in the trap of Chirag by becoming a goon.
- Pankaj Tripathi as Narottam Mishra: Bitti's father who wanted Bitti to do whatever she wanted to do.
- Seema Pahwa as Susheela Mishra: Bitti's mother who thinks that Pritam is best for her.
- Rohit Chaudhary as Munna: Chirag's best friend who also troubles Pritam.
- Swati Semwal as Rama: Bitti's friend and Pritam's love-interest.
- Naila Grrewal as Babli: Chirag's ex-girlfriend, who Bareilly Ki Barfi is inspired by and named after.
- Sapna Sand as Pritam's mother

== Soundtrack ==
Bareilly Ki Barfi

Soundtrack album by Tanishk Bagchi, Arko, Samira Koppikar, Sameer Uddin and Vayu
- Released: 24 July 2017
- Genre: Feature film soundtrack
- Length: 26:40
- Language: Hindi
- Label: Zee Music Company

Tanishk Bagchi and Vayu chronology
Munna Michael (2017)	Bareilly Ki Barfi (2017)	Shubh Mangal Saavdhan (2017)

Arko Pravo Mukherjee chronology
Shaadi Mein Zaroor Aana (2017)	Bareilly Ki Barfi (2017)	Sweetiee Weds NRI (2017)

Singles from Bareilly Ki Barfi
- 1. "Sweety Tera Drama" Released: 24 July 2017; 2. "Nazm Nazm" Released: 31 July 2017; 3. "Twist Kamariya" Released: 8 August 2017

The music of the film is composed by Tanishk Bagchi, Arkk, Samira Koppikar, Sameer Uddin and Vayu while the lyrics of the film were written by Arko Pravo Mukherjee, Tanishk Bagchi, Shabbir Ahmed, Puneet Sharma, Abhishek Verma and Vayu. The first song of the film "Sweety Tera Drama" sung by Dev Negi, Pawni Pandey and Shraddha Pandit was released on 24 July 2017. The second song titled "Nazm Nazm" which is sung, written and composed by Mukherjee was released on 31 July 2017. The third single to be released was "Twist Kamariya" sung by Harshdeep Kaur, Yasser Desai, Bagchi and Altamash Faridi, and was released on 8 August 2017. The soundtrack was released by Zee Music Company on 11 August 2017.

Track listing
No.	Title	Lyrics	Music	Singer(s)	Length
1.	"Sweety Tera Drama"	Shabbir Ahmed	Tanishk Bagchi	Dev Negi, Pawni Pandey, Shraddha Pandit	2:27
2.	"Nazm Nazm"	Arko	Arko	Arko	3:47
3.	"Twist Kamariya"	Tanishk Bagchi, Vayu	Tanishk Bagchi, Vayu	Harshdeep Kaur, Yasser Desai, Altamash Faridi	2:28
4.	"Bairaagi"	Puneet Sharma	Samira Koppikar	Arijit Singh, Samira Koppikar	4:12
5.	"Badass Babuaa"	Akshay Verma	Sameer Uddin	Abhishek Nailwal, Neha Bhasin, Sameer Uddin	2:47
6.	"Nazm Nazm" (Ayushmann Khurrana Version)	Arko	Arko	Ayushmann Khurrana	3:14
7.	"Bairaagi" (Samira Koppikar Version)	Puneet Sharma	Samira Koppikar	Samira Koppikar	3:44
8.	"Nazm Nazm" (Sumedha Karmahe Version)	Arko	Arko	Sumedha Karmahe	4:01
Total length:					26:40

== Reception ==
=== Critical response ===
Bareilly Ki Barfi received widespread critical acclaim upon release, with praise for its heartwarming and simple story, music and performances of the cast, with major praise directed towards Rao's performance.

Meena Iyer of The Times of India gave the film 4/5 stars, writing, "The writers Nitesh Tiwari and Shreyas Jain have put together a sweet, identifiable crowd-pleaser that excels in the writing, direction, acting and music departments." Devesh Sharma of Filmfare gave the film a rating of 4/5 stars and concluded the review saying that, "All-in-all, Bareilly Ki Barfi is a good second film from Ashwiny Iyer Tiwari and gives her a chance to prove her versatility. Watch the film for some good, clean fun. It will give you ample laughs throughout and you’ll walk away from the theatre with a satisfied smile on your face." Rohit Vats of Hindustan Times praised the film saying that, "Kriti Sanon-Ayushmann Khurrana's Bareilly Ki Barfi manages to capture the flavor of small-town India, with Rajkummar Rao bringing in the chutzpah" and gave the film a 3.5/5 star rating.

Samruddhi Ghosh of India Today appreciated the performances of the actors saying that, "The strength of Bareilly Ki Barfi is its cast. Kriti Sanon's bohemian small-town-girl act is a far-cry from her usual fare, but she pulls it off with aplomb. Ayushmann Khurrana looks effortless as the jilted aashiq trying to win over the woman of his dreams by hook or by crook. But it is Rajkummar Rao who steals the show as the timid-salesman-turned-rangbaaz." She concluded her review by saying that, "After Nil Battey Sannata, director Ashwini Iyer Tiwari brings us another engaging watch. There is no dull moment in the film. Light and fluffy, Bareilly Ki Barfi is no heavy 7-course meal, but it is quite the delicious dessert." and gave the film 4/5 stars. Rajeev Masand of News 18 gave the film 3/5 stars and said that, "It's a sweet, inoffensive romantic comedy based on a slim premise, but buoyed by strong performances, the unmistakable charm, and texture of small-town India, and garnished with moments of crackling humor."

== Awards and nominations ==
Date of ceremony	Award	Category	Recipient(s) and nominee(s)	Result	Ref.
2 December 2017	Screen Awards	Best Film	Bareilly Ki Barfi	Nominated	
2 December 2017	Screen Awards	Best Director	Ashwiny Iyer Tiwari	Nominated	
2 December 2017	Screen Awards	Best Actress (Popular)	Kriti Sanon	Nominated	
2 December 2017	Screen Awards	Best Supporting Actor	Rajkummar Rao	Won	
2 December 2017	Screen Awards	Best Dialogue	Ashwiny Iyer Tiwari, Nitesh Tiwari	Won	
30 December 2017	Zee Cine Awards	Best Film (Jury's Choice)	Bareilly Ki Barfi	Nominated	
30 December 2017	Zee Cine Awards	Best Director	Ashwiny Iyer Tiwari	Won	
30 December 2017	Zee Cine Awards	Best Actress (Viewer's Choice)	Kriti Sanon	Nominated	
30 December 2017	Zee Cine Awards	Best Supporting Actor	Rajkummar Rao	Nominated	
30 December 2017	Zee Cine Awards	Best Supporting Actress	Seema Pahwa	Nominated	
30 December 2017	Zee Cine Awards	Best Writing	Nitesh Tiwari	Won	
30 December 2017	Zee Cine Awards	Best Production Design	Laxmi Keluskar, Sandeep Meher	Won	
30 December 2017	Zee Cine Awards	Best Lyricist	Arko Pravo Mukherjee (for the song "Nazm Nazm")	Nominated	
30 December 2017	Zee Cine Awards	Best Male Playback Singer	Arko Pravo Mukherjee (for the song "Nazm Nazm")	Nominated	
30 December 2017	Zee Cine Awards	Best Choreography	Bosco-Caesar	Nominated	
20 January 2018	Filmfare Awards	Best Film	Bareilly Ki Barfi	Nominated	
20 January 2018	Filmfare Awards	Best Director	Ashwiny Iyer Tiwari	Won	
20 January 2018	Filmfare Awards	Best Supporting Actor	Rajkummar Rao	Won	
20 January 2018	Filmfare Awards	Best Supporting Actress	Seema Pahwa	Nominated	
20 January 2018	Filmfare Awards	Best Music Director	Arko, Tanishk Bagchi, Samira Koppikar, Sameer Uddin, Vayu	Nominated	
20 January 2018	Filmfare Awards	Best Lyricist	Arko Pravo Mukherjee (for the song "Nazm Nazm")	Nominated	
20 January 2018	Filmfare Awards	Best Male Playback Singer	Arko Pravo Mukherjee (for the song "Nazm Nazm")	Nominated	
20 January 2018	Filmfare Awards	Best Dialogue	Nitesh Tiwari, Shreyas Jain	Nominated	
28 January 2018	Mirchi Music Awards	Female Vocalist of The Year	Samira Koppikar (for the song "Bairaagi")	Nominated	
28 January 2018	Mirchi Music Awards	Best Background Score	Sameer Uddin	Nominated	
6 March 2018	Bollywood Film Journalists Awards	Best Director	Ashwiny Iyer Tiwari	Won	
6 March 2018	Bollywood Film Journalists Awards	Best Supporting Actor	Rajkummar Rao	Won	
20 March 2018	News18 Reel Movie Awards	Best Supporting Actor	Rajkummar Rao	Nominated	
20 March 2018	News18 Reel Movie Awards	Best Editing	Chandrashekhar Prajapati, Nitin Baid	Nominated	
20 March 2018	News18 Reel Movie Awards	Best Dialogues	Nitesh Tiwari, Shreyas Jain	Nominated	
20 March 2018	News18 Reel Movie Awards	Best Screenplay	Nitesh Tiwari, Shreyas Jain	Nominated	
22 June 2018	International Indian Film Academy Awards	Best Screenplay	Nitesh Tiwari, Shreyas Jain	Won	
22 June 2018	International Indian Film Academy Awards	Best Film	Bareilly Ki Barfi	Nominated	
22 June 2018	International Indian Film Academy Awards	Best Director	Ashwiny Iyer Tiwari	Nominated	
22 June 2018	International Indian Film Academy Awards	Best Supporting Actor	Rajkummar Rao	Nominated	
22 June 2018	International Indian Film Academy Awards	Best Supporting Actress	Seema Pahwa	Nominated	

== Re-release ==
The film was re-released on 7 February 2025 in theatres.
