= Luv Shuv Tey Chicken Khurana =

2012 Indian film by Sameer Sharma

- Theatrical release poster
- Directed by: Sameer Sharma
- Written by: Sumit Batheja
- Produced by: Ronnie Screwvala; Anurag Kashyap; Siddharth Roy Kapur
- Starring: Kunal Kapoor; Huma Qureshi; Rajesh Sharma
- Cinematography: Mitesh Mirchandani
- Edited by: Apurva Motiwale
- Music by: Amit Trivedi
- Production companies: UTV Spotboy; AKFPL; Jar Pictures
- Distributed by: UTV Motion Pictures
- Release date: 2 November 2012
- Running time: 129 minutes
- Country: India
- Language: Hindi
- Budget: ₹3.00 crore (US$310,000)
- Box office: ₹10.5 crore (US$1.1 million) (until Tuesday)

Luv Shuv Tey Chicken Khurana is a 2012 Indian Hindi-language comedy film directed by debutant Sameer Sharma and produced by Ronnie Screwvala, Siddharth Roy Kapur and Anurag Kashyap. The film stars Kunal Kapoor and Huma Qureshi.

== Plot ==
Omi's London dream has just ended. On the run from a dangerous UK gangster to whom he owes money, Omi returns to his native Indian village in Punjab, pretending to be a well-heeled lawyer. Much has changed since Omi ran away from home a decade ago, stealing money from his doting grandfather, Daarji. The old man has since become senile and, more importantly, forgotten the secret recipe of "Chicken Khurana," a dish that made the family dhaba famous across Punjab.

Omi's childhood sweetheart, Harman, is soon to be married to his paternal cousin, Jeet, though neither seems too happy about it. Adding to the quirkiness of the family is a freeloader maternal uncle, Titu, who once did a stint in a mental asylum. Omi's grandfather has a cousin who ran away from home at a young age and is now a saint. When his grandfather dies on his last visit to his restaurant, Omi tries to restore their family restaurant with Harman's help. While working in the restaurant, the two reconcile and rekindle their feelings for each other. Meanwhile, Omi discovers that the secret ingredient from his grandfather's famous chicken recipe was marijuana but keeps it a secret. When the family comes together, Jeet surprises everybody by revealing his love for a Bengali war widow, Shama, and his secret daughter with her. Omi and Harman decide to get married. In the end, the whole family seems happy and is celebrating when the gangster from whom Omi is hiding comes looking for him, and it is revealed to be Titu's long-lost friend.

== Cast ==
- Kunal Kapoor as Omi Khurana
  - Vicky Kaushal as Young Omi
- Huma Qureshi as Harman
- Vinod Nagpal as Daarji
- Rajesh Sharma as Titu Mama (Omi's maternal uncle)
- Rahul Bagga as Jeet Khurana
- Dolly Ahluwalia as Bua Ji (Omi's paternal aunt)
- Rajendra Sethi as Chacha Ji (Omi's paternal uncle)
- Seema Kaushal as Chachi Ji (Omi's paternal aunt)
- Mukesh Chhabra as Lovely (Harman's brother)
- Anangsha Biswas as Shama Chatterjee
- Anjum Batra as Dalidri
- Vipin Sharma as Kehar Singh
- Manish Makhija as Shanty
- Herry Tangri as Manty
- Nimrat Kaur as Muskaan Khurana (Cameo)
- Amit Jalali as Amit
- Tima as Harvard lady
- Faisal Rashid as Deedar Khurana (young Daarji)
- Balwinder Singh as Harman's father
- Gurpreet Brar as Harman's mother

== Soundtrack ==
Luv Shuv Tey Chicken Khurana

Soundtrack album to Luv Shuv Tey Chicken Khurana by Amit Trivedi
- Genres: Feature film soundtrack Punjabi
- Language: Hindi
- Label: UTV
- Producers: Amit Trivedi, Ronnie Screwvala, Siddharth Roy Kapur

All lyrics are written by Shellee; all music is composed by and background score by Amit Trivedi.

No.	Title	Singer(s)	Length
1.	"Kikli Kalerdi"	Amit Trivedi, Pinky Maidasani, Yo Yo Honey Singh
2.	"Motorwada"	Tochi Raina, Amit Trivedi
3.	"Luv Shuv Tey Chicken Khurana"	Shahid Mallya, Harshdeep Kaur
4.	"Luni Hasi" (Female)	Harshdeep Kaur
5.	"Makkhan Malai"	Dilbahar
6.	"Farukha Baadi"	Labh Janjua, Amit Trivedi, Chorus
7.	"Theme" (Instrumental)	Tapas Roy
8.	"Luni Hasi" (Male)	Devender Pal Singh
9.	"Kikli Kalerdi" (Punjabi version)	Amit Trivedi, Pinky Maidasani

Musicperk.com rated the album 7/10 quoting "Amit Trivedi's experiments are back".

== Critical reception ==
Luv Shuv Tey Chicken Khurana received positive reviews. Trisha Gupta on Firstpost.com called it joyfully irreverent without ever feeling flippant: "a version of rural Punjab that is somehow quieter, gentler, sadder and yet funnier than those that have gone before". Madhureeta Mukherjee of Times of India gave it 3.5 stars. "This isn't the perfect chicken recipe for your soul, but never mind, it's the simplicity of emotions that fill you up, leaving a good after-taste." said ToI. Rediff Movies said "Luv Shuv Tey Chicken Khurana is a lovely story, with plenty of Punjab ka tadka." and gave it 3.5 stars. Roshni Devi of Koimoi gave it 3 stars. "Watch Luv Shuv Tey Chicken Khurana for some real Punjabi fun, laughs and touching moments." wrote Roshni Devi. Taran Adarsh of Bollywood Hungama gave it 3.5 stars. Aniruddha Guha of DNA gave it 3 stars. Anupama Chopra from the Hindustan Times gave it 3/5 stars, saying "There is fun to be had here-just have some patience. After all, where else will you see a family having an animated conversation about 'kacchas'".

== Box office ==
=== India ===
Luv Shuv Tey Chicken Khurana nett grossed ₹1.25 crore (US$130,000) on the first day in India. By Tuesday the box office collection increased to about ₹6.25 crore (US$650,000). The run ended with ₹10.5 crore (US$1.1 million), a poor run at the box office.

=== Overseas ===
Luv Shuv Tey Chicken Khurana grossed around $226,000 overseas in 1st weekend.

== See also ==
- Bollywood films of 2012
