= How I Braved Anu Aunty and Co-Founded a Million Dollar Company =

Book by Varun Agarwal

- Cover of First Edition
- Author: Varun Agarwal
- Illustrator: Varun Agarwal
- Language: English
- Genre: Autobiographical
- Publisher: Rupa & Co.
- Publication date: 2012
- Publication place: India
- Media type: Print (Paperback)
- Pages: 249
- ISBN: 9788129119797
- Website: varunagarwal.in/book

How I Braved Anu Aunty and Co-Founded A Million Dollar Company is a novel written by Varun Agarwal, an alumnus of the Bishop Cotton Boys' School, a first-generation entrepreneur and the co-founder of Alma Mater. This is his debut novel and was published in 2012.

== Synopsis ==
The book is a true story, set in Bangalore. Varun, the 20-something protagonist has entrepreneurial dreams but is instead asked to follow the Engineering-plus-MBA route that most people his age seem to have taken. Anu Aunty, the lead character, presents obstacles to Varun's goal of entrepreneurship. However, Varun persists, and after a number of alcohol-induced conversations with his friend from school and later co-founder of Alma Mater, Rohn Malhotra, Varun decides to do something that he wants to do.

The book chronicles how the two of them decided to start a merchandising company called Alma Mater that creates customised clothing and accessories for the alumni of schools and colleges across India.

Anu Aunty is Varun's mother's best friend and plays the role of a middle-aged Indian mother to what she believes to be an over-achieving son. Much to Varun's mother's dismay, Anu Aunty repeatedly belittles Varun and mocks him for his apparently unambitious nature. Every step Varun and his friends take seems to be thwarted by Anu Aunty.

== Reception ==
The Times of India wrote a favourable review where they stated "The book is as light hearted as they come, written in a boyish (almost bordering on childish) style that could appeal to some or prove to be a turn off for others. But the writer, young though he is, manages to hold the interest of his reader right through." The Tribune also praised the work and wrote "The book is a two hundred and forty nine- page pep talk for all wannabe entrepreneurs; offering useful advice. A message of hope, proving by personal example that it's possible to do what you want even without experience."

== Adaptation ==
The 2023 Hindi language film Tumse Na Ho Payega is based on the novel.
