= Bawaal =

2023 Indian film by Nitesh Tiwari

- Official release poster
- Directed by: Nitesh Tiwari
- Written by: Nitesh Tiwari; Piyush Gupta; Nikhil Mehrotra; Shreyas Jain
- Story by: Ashwiny Iyer Tiwari
- Produced by: Sajid Nadiadwala; Ashwiny Iyer Tiwari
- Starring: Varun Dhawan; Janhvi Kapoor
- Cinematography: Mitesh Mirchandani
- Edited by: Charu Shree Roy
- Music by: Songs: Mithoon; Tanishk Bagchi; Akashdeep Sengupta; Background Score: Daniel B. George
- Production companies: Nadiadwala Grandson Entertainment; Earthsky Pictures
- Distributed by: Amazon Prime Video
- Release date: 21 July 2023
- Running time: 137 minutes
- Country: India
- Language: Hindi

Bawaal (transl. Commotion) is a 2023 Indian Hindi-language adventure romantic drama film directed by Nitesh Tiwari, and produced by Sajid Nadiadwala and Ashwiny Iyer Tiwari under Nadiadwala Grandson Entertainment and Earthsky Pictures. It stars Varun Dhawan and Janhvi Kapoor as a troubled married couple.

Filming took place in multiple countries from April to August 2022. Initially scheduled for a theatrical release, Bawaal had a streaming release on Amazon Prime Video on 21 July 2023. The film received mixed reviews from critics, with backlash mostly owing to Holocaust trivialization. Despite the backlash, the film earned multiple nominations, including Best Actor in a Web Original Film and Best Actress in a Web Original Film for Dhawan and Kapoor, respectively, at the 2023 Filmfare OTT Awards.

== Plot ==
Ajay Dixit is an image-conscious narcissist who teaches history at a school in Lucknow. Despite the respect he commands through his philosophical belief in "fake it till you make it", he despises the life of lies he has created. He has grounded his beautiful epileptic wife Nisha, who is considerably more intelligent than him, fearing that her seizures will damage his reputation.

Ajay's carefully maintained image is threatened when, frustrated by Atul Raghuvanshi's question about World War II, he slaps the student. Atul is the son of MLA Vishwas Raghuvanshi, leaving Ajay fearful of the consequences. Desperate to escape the MLA's wrath, Ajay decides to travel across Europe to visit places he considers significant to World War II, including Anne Frank's house and Auschwitz.

Ajay takes Nisha with him, as his parents hope the journey will help resolve their marital problems. As they travel, the couple encounter places and experiences that challenge their assumptions about history, life and their relationship. The journey ultimately changes their perspectives and their approach to interpersonal conflicts, while providing them with lessons drawn from both history and life.

== Cast ==
- Varun Dhawan as Ajay Dixit
- Janhvi Kapoor as Nisha Dixit
- Manoj Pahwa as Mr. Dixit, Ajay's father
- Anjuman Saxena as Mrs. Dixit, Ajay's mother
- Mukesh Tiwari as MLA Vishwas Raghuvanshi
- Prateek Pachori as Bipin
- Vyas Hemang as Kalpesh
- Shashie Vermaa as Principal
- Agrim Mittal as Papon Chatterjee
- Nikhil Chawla as Atul Raghuvanshi, Vishwas's son
- Thibault Gouzarch as Thief

== Production ==
The film title was announced along with its release date and the cast on 30 March 2022.

Filming began in April 2022, and was shot in Mumbai, Kanpur, Lucknow, Paris, Berlin, Amsterdam, Kraków, Warsaw, Auschwitz (present-day Oświęcim) and in parts of Poland. Sajid Nadiadwala announced that the filming completed in August 2022.

== Soundtrack ==
Bawaal

Soundtrack album by Mithoon, Tanishk Bagchi and Akashdeep Sengupta
- Released: 23 July 2023
- Recorded: 2022
- Genre: Feature film soundtrack
- Length: 15:36
- Label: T-Series

Official audio
- Bawaal (Audio Jukebox) on YouTube

Singles from Bawaal
- 1. "Tumhe Kitna Pyaar Karte" Released: 7 July 2023; 2. "Dil Se Dil Tak" Released: 14 July 2023; 3. "Dilon Ki Doriyan" Released: 18 July 2023

Soundtrack is composed by Mithoon, Tanishk Bagchi, Akashdeep Sengupta. The lyrics are written by Kausar Munir, Manoj Muntashir, Arafat Mehmood, Shloke Lal.

The first single, "Tumhe Kitna Pyaar Karte" was released on 7 July 2023. The 2nd single titled "Dil Se Dil Tak" was released on 14 July 2023. The third single titled "Dilon Ki Doriyan" was released on 18 July 2023.

Track listing
No.	Title	Lyrics	Music	Singer(s)	Length
1.	"Tumhe Kitna Pyaar Karte"	Manoj Muntashir	Mithoon	Arijit Singh	5:05
2.	"Dil Se Dil Tak"	Kausar Munir	Akashdeep Sengupta	Laqshay Kapoor, Akashdeep Sengupta, Suvarna Tiwari	5:01
3.	"Dilon Ki Doriyan"	Arafat Mehmood	Tanishk Bagchi	Vishal Mishra, Zahrah S Khan, Romy	3:00
4.	"Kat Jayega"	Shloke Lal	Tanishk Bagchi	Romy, Pravesh Mallick	2:30
Total length:					15:36

== Release ==
The film premiered on 21 July 2023 on Amazon Prime Video.

== Reception ==
Bawaal received mixed reviews from critics. On the review aggregator website Rotten Tomatoes, 21% of 19 critics' reviews are positive, with an average rating of 3.9/10.

Shubhra Gupta of The Indian Express gave the film 1.5 out of 5, writing, "Varun Dhawan-Janhvi Kapoor-starrer promises a lot, but keeps faltering, never quite knowing what to make of a wholly harebrained flourish in the plot." Leaf Arbuthnot of The Guardian gave the film 1 out of 5, calling the premise "serviceable" but the plot "woefully misjudged." She further wrote that "it is just a pity that rest of the film is so lacking in fun, pep, humour and charm that only its spectacularly poor taste stands out."

Amongst positive reviews, Sukanya Verma of Rediff.com gave the film 3 out of 5, writing, "Director Nitesh Tiwari has a knack for creating intriguing characters and scenarios that feel fresh yet familiar at the same time. But the underlying goal behind all their actions -- questionable or inspirational -- is rooted in wisdom." Lachmi Deb Roy of Firstpost gave the film 3 out of 5, writing, "Despite all its drawbacks, one takeaway from the film is that it’s okay to be an average person with imperfections than to be a fake person."

Several publications criticized the film for "insensitive portrayal" of the Holocaust. (Note: Attributed to multiple references:) Rabbi Abraham Cooper of the Jewish human rights organisation Simon Wiesenthal Center asked Amazon to “stop monetising” Bawaal with immediate effect and called the film a “banal trivialisation of the suffering and systematic murder of millions of victims of the Nazi Holocaust.” On 28 July 2023, Embassy of Israel, New Delhi tweeted that "The Israeli embassy is disturbed by the trivialization of the significance of the Holocaust in the recent movie 'Bawaal'." They also criticised the "poor choice in the utilization of some terminology in the movie."

=== Accolades ===
Year	Award ceremony	Category	Nominee / work	Result	Ref.
2023	Filmfare OTT Awards	Best Actor in a Web Original Film	Varun Dhawan	Nominated	
2023	Filmfare OTT Awards	Best Actress in a Web Original Film	Janhvi Kapoor	Nominated	
2023	Filmfare OTT Awards	Best Story (Web Original Film)	Ashwiny Iyer Tiwari	Nominated	
2023	Filmfare OTT Awards	Best Original Screenplay (Web Original Film)	Nikhil Mehrotra, Shreyas Jain, Piyush Gupta, Nitesh Tiwari	Nominated	
2023	Filmfare OTT Awards	Best Background Music (Web Original Film)	Daniel B. George	Nominated	
2023	Filmfare OTT Awards	Best Production Design (Web Original Film)	Aditya Kanwar	Nominated	
2023	Filmfare OTT Awards	Best Cinematographer (Web Original Film)	Mitesh Mirchandani	Nominated	
2023	Filmfare OTT Awards	Best Editing (Web Original Film)	Charu Shree Roy	Nominated	
2023	Filmfare OTT Awards	Best Sound Design (Web Original Film)	Sanjay Maurya, Allwin Rego	Nominated	
