= Break Point (2021 TV series) =

2021 Indian documentary series

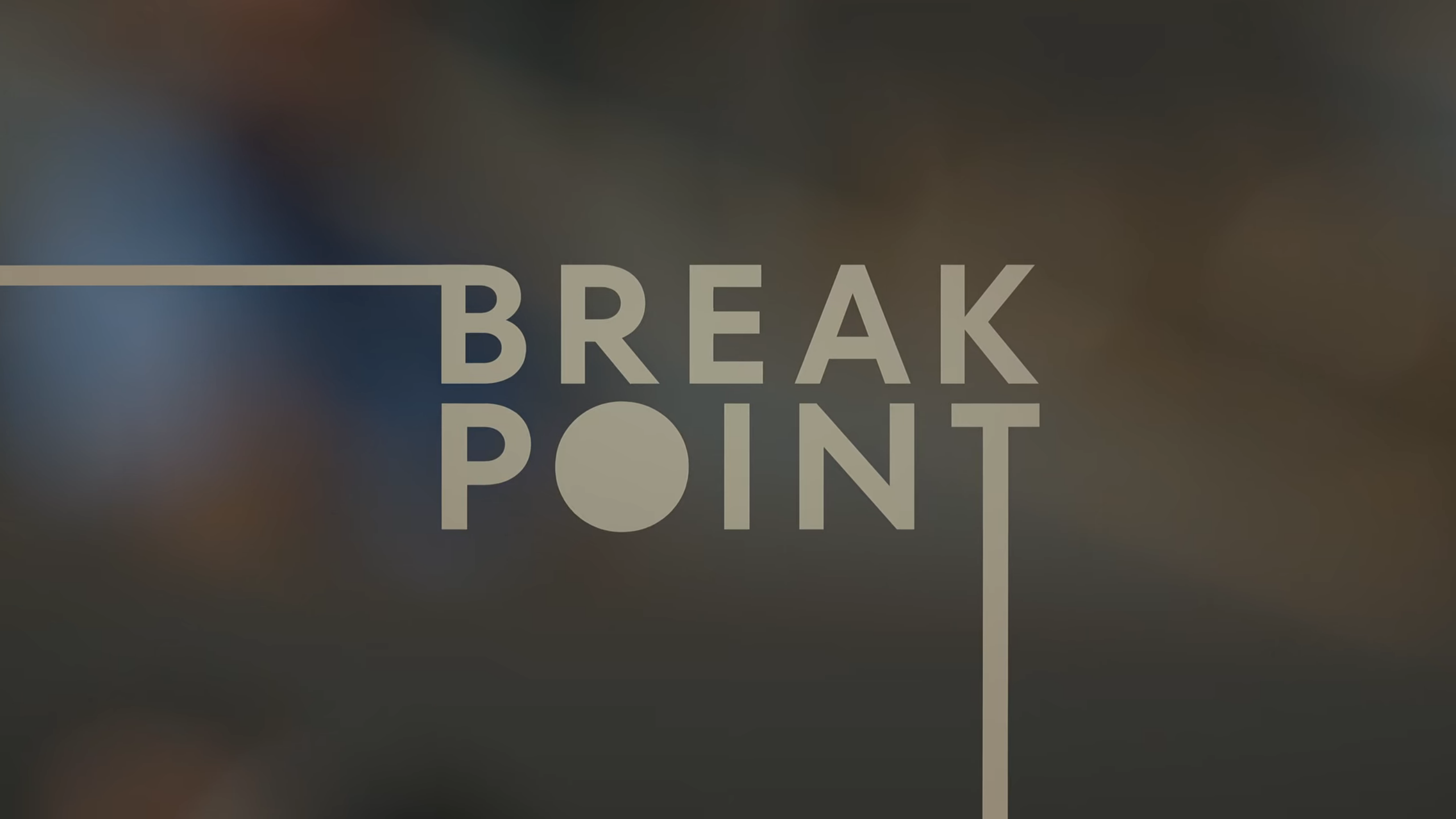
- Titlecard
- Genre: Documentary
- Directed by: Nitesh Tiwari; Ashwiny Iyer Tiwari
- Creative director: Piyush Gupta
- Starring: Leander Paes; Mahesh Bhupathi
- Country of origin: India
- Original languages: Hindi, English; Tamil, Telugu
- No. of seasons: 1
- No. of episodes: 7 (list of episodes)

Production
- Executive producer: Varun B. Shetty
- Producers: Ashwiny Iyer Tiwari; Nitesh Tiwari
- Production location: India
- Cinematography: Kuldeep Mamania
- Editors: Charu Shree Roy; Irene Dhar Malik
- Running time: 40 mins per episode
- Production company: Earthsky Pictures

Original release
- Network: ZEE5
- Release: 1 October 2021

Break Point is an Indian documentary series from ZEE5 directed by Nitesh Tiwari and Ashwiny Iyer Tiwari, produced by Earthsky Pictures. The series is inspired by the successful Indian tennis doubles duo Mahesh Bhupathi and Leander Paes.

== Plot ==
The story follows the professional and personal relationship between former Indian tennis doubles players Mahesh Bhupathi and Leander Paes leading to and following their Wimbledon win in 1999.

== Cast ==
Leander Paes and Mahesh Bhupathi play themselves.

== Production ==
Nitesh Tiwari interviews the Indian tennis doubles duo Paes and Bhupathi and their family members. Tiwari also interviews other Indian tennis players and the duo's international partners. Archive footage and short interviews with Sania Mirza and Amitabh Bachchan are used.

== Releases ==
ZEE5 released the trailer for Break Point on 17 September 2021 and the series launched on 1 October 2021. The web series was presented at the 52nd International Film Festival of India in November 2021.

== Episodes ==
| No. overall | No. in season | Title | Directed by | Original release date |
|---|---|---|---|---|
| 1 | 1 | "Two Little Indian Boys" | Ashwiny Iyer Tiwari and Nitesh Tiwari | 1 October 2021 |
To keep their fathers' wishes with the Indian flag flying high, two little boys deep dive into the world of tennis. They start bonding at Junior Wimbledon, where Mahesh Bhupathi was allowed to stay in Leander Paes room.
| 2 | 2 | "Made in India" | Ashwiny Iyer Tiwari and Nitesh Tiwari | 1 October 2021 |
The partnership of Leander Paes and Mahesh Bhupathi (Lee-Hesh) conquers tennis courts across the world. Amidst continuous success on the tennis court, their off-court connection is tested when Bhupathi brings on Paes's former coach, Rico.
| 3 | 3 | "Masters of Clay" | Ashwiny Iyer Tiwari and Nitesh Tiwari | 1 October 2021 |
After coming close to the 1999 Australian Open, Lee-Hesh are upbeat about winning the year's French Open. But to win their first Grand Slam together, they have to overcome more than just the slippery surface of Parisian clay courts.
| 4 | 4 | "Two Good, Two Bad" | Ashwiny Iyer Tiwari and Nitesh Tiwari | 1 October 2021 |
Paes and Bhupathi capture India's imagination after winning the French Open series. The only tournament left to win is Wimbledon but, as they get ready for their biggest competition, their relationship is at an all-time low.
| 5 | 5 | "Double Fault" | Ashwiny Iyer Tiwari and Nitesh Tiwari | 1 October 2021 |
As their friendship dissolves, the magic between Lee-Hesh vanishes. At the last tournament of the year in Hartford, their true partnership is tested. Paes suggested Bhupathi's coach, Rico, take a break since they lost the finals.
| 6 | 6 | "The Comeback" | Ashwiny Iyer Tiwari and Nitesh Tiwari | 1 October 2021 |
Leander Paes and Mahesh Bhupathi come together for the Sydney Olympics in 2000. However, they split again in the next year after they lose the series. Leander Paes is diagnosed with a brain tumour. He fights it and makes a comeback in the Athens Olympics in 2004.
| 7 | 7 | "One for the Nation" | Ashwiny Iyer Tiwari and Nitesh Tiwari | 1 October 2021 |
Lee-Hesh lose the cup in the Asian Games at Doha in 2006. Still, Paes questions Bhupathi's fitness. Notwithstanding their disagreements, the President of AITA signs Lee-Hesh for another tournament.

== Reception ==
Vivek M V of the Deccan Herald gave the show 4/5 stars, stating that it was a compelling and shocking confession with the determination in their love, indifference, and hatred towards each other makes Break Point bingeworthy. He praises the interviews with the duo's friends and family, but criticises the lack of focus during the Davis Cup.

Subhash K Jha of IWMBuzz.com rated it 3/5. Jha noted that Bhupathi's description of their difficulties were more superficial, but Paes expressed more emotions when recounting their split.

LatestLY rated the documentary 3/5 stars, writing that it is a perfectly balanced love story with a dramatised breakup that was fantastically executed. The reviewers remarked that the pacing mirrors a love story. The site found the series was slightly too dramatic and lacked explanations for some sequences. Overall, they praised it as a remarkable attempt to answer what went awry between Paes and Bhupathi.
