= Pinky Maidasani =

Indian folk rapper and playback singer

- Origin: India
- Genres: Bollywood
- Occupation: Singer
- Years active: 2006–present
- Labels: T-Series; Yo Yo Honey Singh
- Website: Official website

Pinky Maidasani is an Indian rapper and playback singer. She has been described as the first female folk rapper of India, blending Rajasthani folk music with modern rap. She has performed in more than 5000 live shows; her songs have been featured in recent Bollywood movies. She sings in 13 languages. She has sung songs in the Bollywood film Luv Shuv Tey Chicken Khurana. She sang a Punjabi rap song "Kikli Kalerdi" accompanied with Yo Yo Honey Singh. In 2015, her film Sharafat Gayi Tel Lene hit the theatres. She combined the rap with desi music.

== Early life ==
She was born in a Sindhi family. Her father was employed in the railways, because of which she stayed in remote locations of northern and central India in her childhood. She is the youngest of five siblings. Her family supported her to pursue a career in singing.

== Career ==
In her childhood, she started music classes from the late Ustad Hibzul Kabir Khan Sahib in Katni, Madhya Pradesh. In Katni she used to sing bhajans at the Madhav Shah Darbar. Pinky started as a contesting artist in reality show Indian Idol 3 and has since sung songs for Bollywood films.

== Filmography ==
As a playback singer she has performed in following Bollywood movies.

- Brahmachari
- Sharafat Gayi Tel Lene
- Luv Shuv Tey Chicken Khurana
- Chann Pardesi
- Mr Joe B. Carvalho
- Sharma Ji Ki Lag Gayi

=== Singles ===
- Bullet Wale Saiyaan
- Chumma Chaati
- Aya Ladiya
- Kikli Kalerdi
- Dilli ki Sarkar
- Turn it up
- Dekh Le Kismat Yaar
- Tera Rang
- Rang Dangi Teri Choli
- Tere Ishq Mein Fanna
- Holi Ke Bahane Rishta Jod Jaad Le
- Sindh
- Saiyaan Ji
