= Sameer Sharma (director) =

Indian film director

- Occupation: Film Director

Sameer Sharma is an Indian film director who made his directorial debut in 2012 with the comedy film Luv Shuv Tey Chicken Khurana.

== Career ==
Sameer Sharma started his film career as an assistant director on films Dilwale Dulhania Le Jayenge and Dil To Pagal Hai. He has also written the films Swades, Bhoot, and Khoya Khoya Chand and some of the dialogue for the movie Raincoat.

=== Luv Shuv Tey Chicken Khurana ===
Sharma said, "There is a moment in the film where the protagonist accepts that he is a ‘nobody’, and that particular moment came from me. Though I was writing for other directors, people around me were not sure if I would eventually make something of my own. I had a point to prove and that was perhaps the starting point for my film. At that time Sumit Batheja was pitching a Punjabi short film to one of Anurag’s co-producers, Guneet Monga and, being a Punjabi, I was intrigued."

So he collaborated with Sumit Batheja and wrote a completely Punjabi version of Luv Shuv Tey Chicken Khurana and pitched it to Rakeysh Omprakash Mehra. Though Mehra liked it, Sharma and Batheja felt that there was something missing, so they went back to the script and reworked some portions. Once they were satisfied with what they had written, they showed it to Vikramaditya Motwane. He loved it and said that if Anurag Kashyap doesn't produce it, he would. Sameer Sharma was happy that they had done something right.

Sameer Sharma narrates,"I was on my way to Varanasi to narrate the script to Anurag Kashyap and coincidentally found that he was on the same flight. I had carried the script to make notes and he asked me if I had it. He took the script from me, sat a few rows ahead and started reading it. I could hear him laugh while reading and that is when I realised that we had a potential winner, but at that point I wasn't very sure if it would work."

Of Luv Shuv Tey Chicken Khurana he says "I have drawn inspiration from real life experiences for the film as I have first-hand account of how tough and competitive the hospitality and food industry can be. I think it is important to make an honest film which is going to engage people and it can be any genre. You have to communicate with the audience. Give them a sense of emotion, make them laugh, touch their souls. It's all about what you create for them."

He says, "I don’t believe in the brainless entertainer genre. It doesn't suit my sensibility. I am here to make films that will be remembered. No matter if a film makes Rs 100 crores – will it be talked about post the opening weekend ? Films like Anand and Bawarchi are very close to my heart and these are stories that we actually connect with. If after watching Luv Shuv Tey Chicken Khurana the audience feels like reconnecting with their families, my job is done."

=== Current work ===
As of 2013, Sharma is working on his next film, Jugalbandi, which will revolve around music. It is rumoured to star Rajkummar Rao. It will be dedicated to his maternal grandfather, singer Mukesh. It will tell the story of two musicians, the guru and the shishya. The film which will be produced by Salman Khan under Salman Khan Films will have Saif Ali Khan as the lead.

== Filmography ==
- Luv Shuv Tey Chicken Khurana (2012)
- Jugalbandi (TBD)
- Dilwale Dulhania Le Jayenge (assistant director)
- Dil To Pagal Hai (assistant director)
- Swades (screenplay)
- Bhoot (screenplay)
- Khoya Khoya Chand (screenplay)
- Raincoat (dialogues)

== Personal life ==
Sharma's maternal grandfather was singer Mukesh, and his paternal grandfather was film distributor B. M. Sharma. Actor Neil Nitin Mukesh is his second cousin.
