= Mederma =

Topical gel sold to improve scar appearance

Mederma is a topical product used to improve scar appearance. It is a gel based on an onion extract. Mederma is product of HRA Pharma, a division of Perrigo. A Mederma marketing claim is that the product can make scars "softer, smoother, and less noticeable".

== Ownership ==
The Mederma brand was owned by Merz Pharma for over 20 years until its 2019 sale to HRA Pharma. Perrigo then acquired HRA Pharma as a subsidiary in 2021.

== Effectiveness ==
A 1999 pilot trial found an onion extract gel less effective than the petrolatum.

A 2002 study published in Plastic and Reconstructive Surgery examined the effectiveness of Mederma on hypertrophic scars on rabbit ears. It found no significant reduction in the size, height, or inflammation of scars. The only improvement was dermal collagen organization when compared to scars that were not treated with Mederma, thus suggesting that it may have a positive effect on the formation of raised scars.

A 2006 clinical trial found no statistically significant change in hypertrophic scar appearance from products of this type compared to the standard petrolatum emollient.

According to a 2011 Los Angeles Times article, "there were just two randomized comparison trials of Mederma, with a combined total of 38 participants. Neither trial found that Mederma improved the appearance of scars more than petroleum jelly".

== Ingredients ==
=== Active ===
Allantoin

=== Inactive ===
Water (purified), PEG 200, alcohol, xanthan gum, allium cepa (onion) bulb extract, lecithin, methylparaben, sorbic acid, panthenol, sodium hyaluronate, fragrance
