= Prayaag Akbar =

Indian journalist and novelist

- Born: 25 July 1982 (age 44); Kolkata, West Bengal, India
- Occupation: Writer/Journalist
- Writing career
- Notable work: Leila

Prayaag Akbar is an Indian novelist and professor of creative writing. His debut novel, Leila won the Crossword Jury Prize and Tata Literature First Book Award and was shortlisted for The Hindu Literary Prize. In February 2018, Netflix announced that it would be developing a series based on the novel. His second novel, Mother India, was published in 2024 to critical acclaim.

He is the former deputy editor of Scroll.in and was a reporter for Outlook magazine. He has written for publications including Indian Express and Caravan, covering issues of caste, class, and politics.

He is currently a professor of literature at Krea University.

== Life ==
Prayaag studied economics at Dartmouth College and comparative politics at the London School of Economics, and spent a year at Routledge as a publicity assistant.

=== Novels ===
- Leila (2017)
- Mother India: A Novel (2024)
