= Ashwiny Iyer Tiwari =

Indian filmmaker

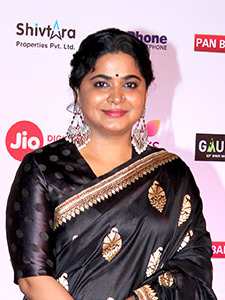
- Tiwari in 2018
- Born: 15 October 1979 (age 47); Mumbai, Maharashtra, India
- Occupations: Film director; writer; producer
- Notable work: Break Point; Bareilly Ki Barfi; Panga; Nil Battey Sannata
- Spouse: Nitesh Tiwari
- Children: 2

Ashwiny Iyer Tiwari (born 15 October 1979) is an Indian film director and writer. After working in advertising for several years, she made her debut by directing the comedy-drama Nil Battey Sannata (2016). The film garnered great reviews and Tiwari went on to direct its Tamil remake entitled Amma Kanakku. She had previously served as the Executive Creative Director at Leo Burnett before she moved on to pursue a filmmaking career. Tiwari won the Filmfare Award for Best Director for the romantic comedy-drama Bareilly Ki Barfi (2017).

== Early life and background ==
Ashwiny Iyer was born on 15 October 1979 in a Tamil speaking family and grew up in the suburb of Mulund, Mumbai. She studied at St. Mary's Convent High School, Mulund and did her higher studies from SIES College of Commerce and Economics. She is married to writer-director Nitesh Tiwari.

== Career ==
=== Advertising ===
A gold medalist in commercial arts from Sophia Polytechnic, Mumbai, Ashwiny spent 15 years in the advertising agency Leo Burnett (India). She won several awards like Cannes Lions, New York festival, One show, Promax and the Goafest Awards. She quit Leo Burnett to follow her passion in filmmaking.

=== Films ===
==== Work on short films and directorial debut (2012-2016) ====
Iyer made her first short film What's for Breakfast in 2012. In 2016, she made her feature film directorial debut with the comedy-drama Nil Battey Sannata starring Swara Bhasker in the lead role. The film was produced by Colour Yellow Productions (Aanand L Rai) in association with JAR Pictures and Opticus Inc. and presented by Eros International. Its story was inspired by a contestant from the quiz show Kaun Banega Crorepati hosted by Amitabh Bachchan which inspired many Indian viewers. Released under the title of The New Classmate internationally, Nil Battey Sannata received positive reviews upon release, with praise for Tiwari's direction and sensitive handling of the subject matter. The film emerged as a commercial failure at the box-office. It earned Iyer the Filmfare Award for Best Debut Director. She remade the film in Tamil as Amma Kanakku with Amala Paul in the lead role, which released on 24 June in the same year.

==== Success (2017-present) ====
Iyer achieved her breakthrough with the romantic comedy-drama Bareilly Ki Barfi (2017) starring Kriti Sanon, Ayushmann Khurrana and Rajkummar Rao in lead roles. Based on Nicolas Barreau's novel The Ingredients of Love, the film received widespread critical acclaim upon release, with high praise for its direction, screenplay, dialogue, soundtrack, setting and the performances of the cast. Devesh Sharma praised the film in his four stars out of five review for Filmfare; he praised Tiwari for her versatility and wrote that the film, "will give you ample laughs throughout and you’ll walk away from the theatre with a satisfied smile on your face." It emerged as a major commercial success at the box-office, grossing over ₹60 crore (US$7.5 million) worldwide. Bareilly Ki Barfi earned Iyer the Filmfare Award for Best Director.

In 2018, Iyer teamed up with Kangana Ranaut, Neena Gupta, Richa Chadda and Jassie Gill to make Panga, a film about a new-age family that challenges stereotypes. The film released on 24 January 2020 and was critically acclaimed. It was the tenth highest-grossing Hindi film of the year.

She signed a two-film deal with Ekta Kapoor's Balaji Motion Pictures from which one she will direct and another she will produce along with Ekta.

She turned author with her debut fiction novel, titled Mapping Love which released on 1 August 2021 to glowing reviews.

Iyer is the co-founder of the production house, Earthsky Pictures, under which she has produced Break Point, a docu-series based on Tennis legends, Leander Paes and Mahesh Bhupathi, and several ad films.

She is also directing the life story of Mr. Narayan Murthy and Mrs. Sudha Murthy.

== Filmography ==
=== As Director ===
Year	Film	Notes
2013	What's For Breakfast?	
2016	Nil Battey Sannata	
2016	Amma Kanakku	Remake of Nil Battey Sannata in Tamil
2017	Bareilly Ki Barfi	
2020	Panga	
2020	Ghar Ki Murgi	Short film
2021	Ankahi Kahaniya	Anthology film; Released on Netflix
2021	Break Point	Documentary series; Released on Zee5
2022	Faadu	Web series
2026	System	Additional screenplay

=== As Co-writer ===
Year	Film	Notes
2013	What's For Breakfast?	
2016	Nil Battey Sannata	
2020	Panga	
2026	System	Additional screenplay

=== As Producer ===
Year	Film	Notes
2020	Ghar Ki Murgi	Short film
2021	Break Point	Documentary series; Released on Zee5
2023	Tarla	Released on ZEE5
2023	Bawaal	Released on Amazon Prime
2023	Tumse Na Ho Payega	Released on Disney+ Hotstar

== Awards and honours ==
Year	Film	Award	Category	Result
2017	Nil Battey Sannata	Filmfare Awards	Best Debut Director	Won
2018	Bareilly Ki Barfi	Filmfare Awards	Best Director	Won
2018	Bareilly Ki Barfi	IIFA Awards	Best Director	Nominated
2018	Bareilly Ki Barfi	Screen Awards	Best Director	Nominated
2018	Bareilly Ki Barfi	Zee Cine Awards	Best Director	Won
