= Nitesh Tiwari =

Indian filmmaker (born 1973)

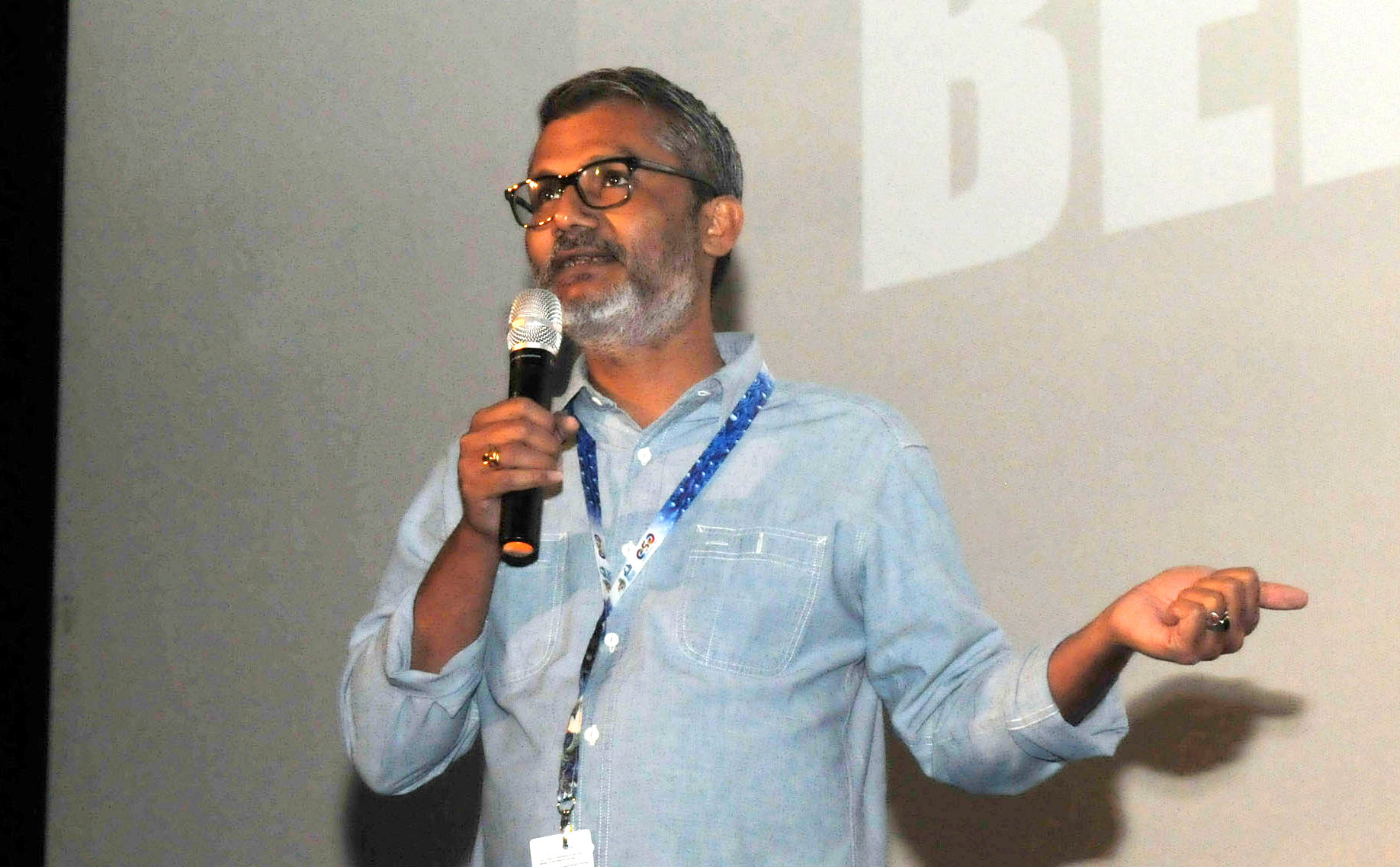
- Born: 22 May 1973 (age 53); Itarsi, Madhya Pradesh, India
- Education: Indian Institute of Technology Bombay, 1996
- Occupations: Director, producer, writer
- Years active: 2011–present
- Notable work: Chillar Party; Bhoothnath Returns; Dangal; Chhichhore; Break Point; Ramayana: Part 1
- Spouse: Ashwiny Iyer
- Children: 2

Nitesh Tiwari (born 22 May 1973) is an Indian film director, screenwriter, and lyricist known for his works in Hindi films. He debuted as a co-writer and co-director in Chillar Party (2011) which won him two National Film Awards, including Best Children's Film and Best Screenplay. He made his solo directorial debut with the supernatural political drama Bhoothnath Returns (2014).

Tiwari scripted and directed the highest grossing Indian film Dangal (2016), which was screened at the Beijing International Film Festival and the second BRICS festival. The film won him the Award for Best Director at the 62nd Filmfare Awards and the Telstra People's Choice Award at the 2017 Indian Film Festival of Melbourne. He followed up with the critically acclaimed coming-of-age film Chhichhore (2019), winning him a third National Film Award for Best Feature Film in Hindi. Tiwari also directed the most expensive Indian film Ramayana: Part 1 (2026), based on the ancient Indian epic.

He co-founded Earthsky Pictures, producing ad films and the docu-series Break Point based on Indian tennis legends Mahesh Bhupathi and Leander Paes.

== Early life and education ==
Tiwari was born in Madhya Pradesh to B. D. Tiwari, who worked in the education department, resulting in the family moving every three years, and Twari did his schooling from different towns in Madhya Pradesh, including Ganj Basoda and Itarsi. He attended Bharat Mata Convent School at Ganj Basoda until class 8th, subsequently he attended a school in Vidisha, approximately 42 km away, as there were no English-medium schools in Gang Basoda at the time. For this he would cycle to Ganj Basoda railway station, along with other students, to travel to Vidisha.

He has a brother and a sister. He graduated from the Indian Institute of Technology Bombay in 1996 with a bachelor's degree in Metallurgy and Material Science engineering. He worked as a creative director at Leo Burnett before entering Bollywood. He performed in a school play titled "Tapori-Mughal-e-Azam".

== Career ==
=== 2010s: ===
Tiwari began his filmmaking career with the 2011 feature Chillar Party. While serving as a creative director at Leo Burnett, Tiwari and co-writer Vikas Bahl, who was a creative head for UTV Spotboy, developed the screenplay as a collaborative project. Following a series of rejections from established directors who were reluctant to helm a film centered on a children’s ensemble, the pair chose to co-direct the project themselves, with UTV founder Ronnie Screwvala and actor Salman Khan producing the project. For his debut work, Tiwari received two National Film Awards, including Best Children's Film and Best Screenplay, solidifying his successful transition from advertising to feature filmmaking.

Following his debut, Tiwari transitioned to sole directorial duties for the 2014 supernatural political satire Bhoothnath Returns, a sequel to 2008's Bhoothnath; it marked the beginning of his association with fellow writers and future filmmakers Piyush Gupta and Shreyas "Sherry" Jain. The film received generally positive reviews, with critics praising its social commentary on the Indian electoral process, though some noted a shift in tone from the children-centric original to a more mature political narrative. The same year, he reunited with Gupta and Jain as a writer for the Yash Raj Films-produced action-thriller Kill Dil (2014), directed by Shaad Ali. Unlike his directorial work, Kill Dil received a poor response from critics; reviews often pointed to a disconnect between the film's stylish aesthetic and its narrative, with many reviewers critiquing the script’s lack of depth and uneven execution.

In 2016, he expanded his writing portfolio with the universally acclaimed film Nil Battey Sannata. Directed by his wife, Ashwiny Iyer Tiwari, the film’s narrative is about a domestic worker’s struggle to secure a better future for her daughter through education. Several critics noted that the screenplay successfully balanced social commentary with heartfelt storytelling.

Also in 2016, Tiwari scripted and directed his career-defining film Dangal, once again being joined by Gupta and Jain as writers, with debutante writer Nikhil Mehrotra, a former junior at Leo Burnett, also joining. The biographical sports drama was based on the life of wrestler Mahavir Singh Phogat and his daughters, Geeta and Babita. The making of the film was notable for its rigorous research, including extensive interviews with the Phogat family, and wrestling training for the actors. Dangal received universal critical acclaim for its grounded narrative, emotional depth, and focus on female empowerment. Critics highlighted his ability to balance a "hero-centric" star vehicle with a screenplay that allowed the performances of the lead actresses to anchor the film alongside Aamir Khan. It became (and remains) the highest-grossing Indian film of all time, achieving major international success, particularly in China. Among its numerous accolades, Tiwari won the Filmfare Award for Best Director.

In 2017, he continued his collaboration with his wife on the romantic comedy Bareilly Ki Barfi, serving as the film's primary writer alongside Jain. The film was well-regarded for its quirky characters and sharp, localized writing. Following this, he returned to the director's chair for the 2019 coming-of-age drama Chhichhore. Drawing from his own experiences as an engineering student at IIT Bombay, Tiwari directed and cowrote the film with Gupta and Mehrotra, which explored themes of friendship, academic pressure, and the transition into adulthood. Chhichhore was both a commercial success and critically well received for its nostalgic tone and portrayal of the anxieties faced by contemporary students. The film won him his third National Film Award, for Best Feature Film in Hindi.

=== 2020s: ===
In the following years, Tiwari expanded into digital streaming, maintaining a prolific output across various roles. He co-wrote the Netflix anthology Ankahi Kahaniya (2021) and the Disney+ Hotstar comedy-drama Tumse Na Ho Payega (2023). The latter focuses on a corporate employee who decides to quit seeking a job to pursue entrepreneurship. It was generally viewed as a relatable, lighthearted watch that captures the struggles and aspirations of the modern generation, though some critics noted it occasionally relied on convenient storytelling tropes. That same year, he produced the ZEE5 biopic Tarla, with no creative involvement, which marked Gupta's directorial debut.

His directorial efforts during this period included the acclaimed ZEE5 documentary series Break Point (2021), which tracked the professional relationship between tennis icons Leander Paes and Mahesh Bhupathi and marked his debut as a producer, as well as the Amazon Prime Video romantic drama Bawaal (2023), for which he co-wrote the script with Gupta, Jain and Mehrotra. Bawaal follows a history teacher and his wife who embark on a transformative journey through Europe, visiting significant World War II sites. The film’s reception was polarized.

He directed Ramayana: Part 1, the first installment in a two-part adaptation of the epic of the same name, which is envisioned as his magnum opus. Produced by Namit Malhotra and written in adaptation by Shridhar Raghavan, the large-scale project features an ensemble cast.

== Personal life ==
Tiwari is married to Ashwiny Iyer Tiwari, a former colleague and creative director at Leo Burnett who is also a film director, producer, and writer. He is a father to twins, a boy and a girl.

== Filmography ==
=== As Director ===
Year	Film	Notes
2011	Chillar Party	Directorial debut
2014	Bhoothnath Returns	
2016	Dangal	Filmfare Award for Best Director
2019	Chhichhore	National Film Award for Best Feature Film in Hindi
2021	Break Point	Documentary series
2023	Bawaal	Released on Amazon Prime Video
2026	Ramayana: Part 1	
2028	Ramayana: Part 2 †	

=== As Dialogue Writer ===
Year	Film
2014	Bhoothnath Returns
2014	Kill Dil
2016	Nil Battey Sannata
2016	Dangal
2017	Bareilly Ki Barfi
2019	Chhichhore
2021	Ankahi Kahaniya
2023	Bawaal
2023	Tumse Na Ho Payega
2026	Ramayana: Part 1

=== As Screenplay Writer ===
Year	Film
2014	Bhoothnath Returns
2014	Kill Dil
2016	Nil Battey Sannata
2016	Dangal
2017	Bareilly Ki Barfi
2019	Chhichhore
2021	Ankahi Kahaniya
2023	Bawaal
2023	Tumse Na Ho Payega
2026	Ramayana: Part 1

=== As Story Writer ===
Year	Film	Notes
2011	Chillar Party	
2014	Bhoothnath Returns	
2014	Kill Dil	
2016	Nil Battey Sannata	
2016	Dangal	
2017	Bareilly Ki Barfi	
2019	Chhichhore	
2021	Ankahi Kahaniya	
2021	Break Point	Documentary series

=== As Producer ===
Year	Film	Notes
2021	Break Point	Documentary series; Released on ZEE5
2023	Tarla	Released on ZEE5
2023	Bawaal	Released on Amazon Prime Video
2023	Tumse Na Ho Payega	Released on Disney+ Hotstar
