= Mukkabaaz (soundtrack) =

Soundtrack album by Nucleya, Rachita Arora and Vineet Kumar Singh
- Released: 23 December 2017
- Recorded: 2017
- Genre: Feature film soundtrack
- Length: 42:14
- Language: Hindi
- Label: Eros Music
External audio
- Audio Jukebox on YouTube

Mukkabaaz is the soundtrack album to the 2017 film of the same name directed by Anurag Kashyap, starring Vineet Kumar Singh and Zoya Hussain. The 11-song soundtrack features compositions from Rachita Arora, Nucleya and Singh, and lyrics written by Singh, Hussain Haidry and Sunil Jogi. The soundtrack was released through the Eros Music label on 23 December 2017.

== Background ==
The film's 11-song soundtrack featured nine musical numbers and two alternates. Rachita Arora was the primary composer, curated eight tunes for the album. The song "Paintra" and its extended version was composed by Nucleya. Besides acting, Vineet Kumar Singh also composed the track "Adhura Main" and wrote lyrics for three songs, while the rest of the tracks were written by Hussain Haidry. One song, "Mushkil Hai Apna Meil Priye", was written by author and politician Sunil Jogi based on his own poem. The vocals were provided by DIVINE, Brijesh Shandilya, Swaroop Khan, Rachita Arora, Dev Arijit, Vijay Arora, Khushboo Raj, Deepak Thakur and Sukhwinder Singh. The original score is composed by Prashant Pillai.

Mukkabaaz is Arora's third feature film after she previously composed one song for Newton (2017) and the background score for Shubh Mangal Saavdhan (2017). Kashyap provided her a song to compose and impressed by her work, he enlisted her to compose few of the songs from the film. According to Arora, "the best part about Anurag sir's films is that you don't see actors dancing and lip-syncing; music is the tool for storytelling. He has a clear vision." While composing the songs as per the script was challenging, Kashyap explained her the lyrics and situation for each song and provided her the creative freedom to work on the music. Haidry was recommended by his fellow writer Varun Grover, who met Kashyap and after reading some of the poems, Kashyap provided him the script which he read and wrote lyrics for two situational tracks based on it. The song "Chhipkali" was a separate poem which was not intended to be used in the film, but after Kashyap listened to the lyrics, he wanted to use in the film though Haidry refuted the idea. The song was however used in a montage depicting the protagonist's life and his struggles. Haidry then modified those lyrics as per Swanand Kirkire's suggestion by tweaking the metre for rhythm. The song "Blonde Balma" was deleted from the film.

Singh wrote the lyrics of two songs after Kashyap wanted him to create a "desi rap", similar to the one he had written for Ugly (2014). While he was initially disinterested, Kashyap met him and discussed about the situation which he recorded on his mobile phone and with his ideas he developed the theme for the song "Paintra". The song was written in 15 minutes and was shown to Kashyap which he liked it and sent to Nucleya and Divine, who composed and performed the song, respectively. While Nucleya would often compose singles, the song was written for a specific moment in the film, where "It was written and composed to encapsulate that moment of real struggle, hence I treated it in a very different way than if I was to write a lead single per se for the film." The song eventually served as a tool for the film's narrative to progress.

== Release ==
On 30 November 2017, the song "Paintra" was released as a single from the album. The second song "Mushkil Hai Apna Meil Priye" was released on 15 December. The film's soundtrack was released under the Eros Music label on 23 December 2017. After the album's release, the third song "Bahut Hua Samman" was released on 4 January 2018.

== Reception ==
The album generally received a positive response. Suanshu Khurana of The Indian Express called it "robust" and cited "Paintra" as "one of the better Hindi raps we've heard in a long time." Debarati S Sen of The Times of India praised the album and wrote: "You are left wondering about what deserves the maximum applaud (sic) — the creative music, the intelligent lyrics or the soulful rendition." Vipin Nair of The Hindu wrote that Kashyap extracts another fabulous soundtrack out of yet an offbeat composer. For [Rachita] Arora who showed potential in the Newton number, "Chal Tu Apna Kar" this album proves a winner with the able support of the lyricists." Karthik Srinivasan of Milliblog wrote "Anurag's stellar musical run continues, this time with Rachita Arora".

Namrata Joshi of The Hindu wrote "The fantastic soundtrack, which encapsulates, all that the film wants to convey gets too inconsistently used, often like a piece of loud noise overwhelming the scenes and smothering the performances rather than taking them forward." Stutee Ghosh of The Quint wrote "The music by Rachita Arora is a necessary accoutrement of every carefully crafted scene, and it only makes the impact more powerful and dramatic." Raja Sen of NDTV wrote "the music by Nucleya and Rachita Arora gives it vitality".

The song "Paintra" has been analyzed as one of the best songs of 2018, by Devarsi Ghosh of Scroll.in and Sankhayan Ghosh of Film Companion. Devarsi summarized that "Unlike the Rachita Arora-composed songs, some of which did have zing, Paintra has the quality to endure as a standalone delight outside the film's narrative." Sankhayan reviewed "Nucleya fills it up with noise – trumpets, horns, big drums, a visarjan band on acid – pushing the buttons till it explodes into the most satisfying musical climax of the year."

== Track listing ==
Mukkabaaz (Original Motion Picture Soundtrack) track listing
No.	Title	Lyrics	Music	Singer(s)	Length
1.	"Paintra"	Vineet Kumar Singh	Nucleya	Divine	3:52
2.	"Mushkil Hai Apna Meil Priye"	Sunil Jogi	Rachita Arora	Brijesh Shandilya	5:54
3.	"Paintra" (Extended Version)	Vineet Kumar Singh	Nucleya	Divine	4:04
4.	"Bahut Hua Samman"	Hussain Haidry	Rachita Arora	Swaroop Khan	4:33
5.	"Bahut Dukha Mann"	Hussain Haidry	Rachita Arora	Rachita Arora, Dev Arijit	4:40
6.	"Chhipkali"	Hussain Haidry	Rachita Arora	Vijay Arora	3:28
7.	"Saade Teen Baje"	Hussain Haidry	Rachita Arora	Khushboo Raj	3:28
8.	"Adhura Main"	Vineet Kumar Singh	Vineet Kumar Singh	Deepak Thakur	2:57
9.	"Bahut Hua Samman" (EDM version)	Hussain Haidry	Rachita Arora	Swaroop Khan, Jaspreet Jasz	5:18
10.	"Haathapai"	Hussain Haidry	Rachita Arora	Sukhwinder Singh	4:13
11.	"Blonde Balma" (deleted song)	Hussain Haidry	Rachita Arora	Kalpana Patowary	3:27
Total length:					42:14
