= K.D. Satyam =

Indian film writer and film director (born 1977)

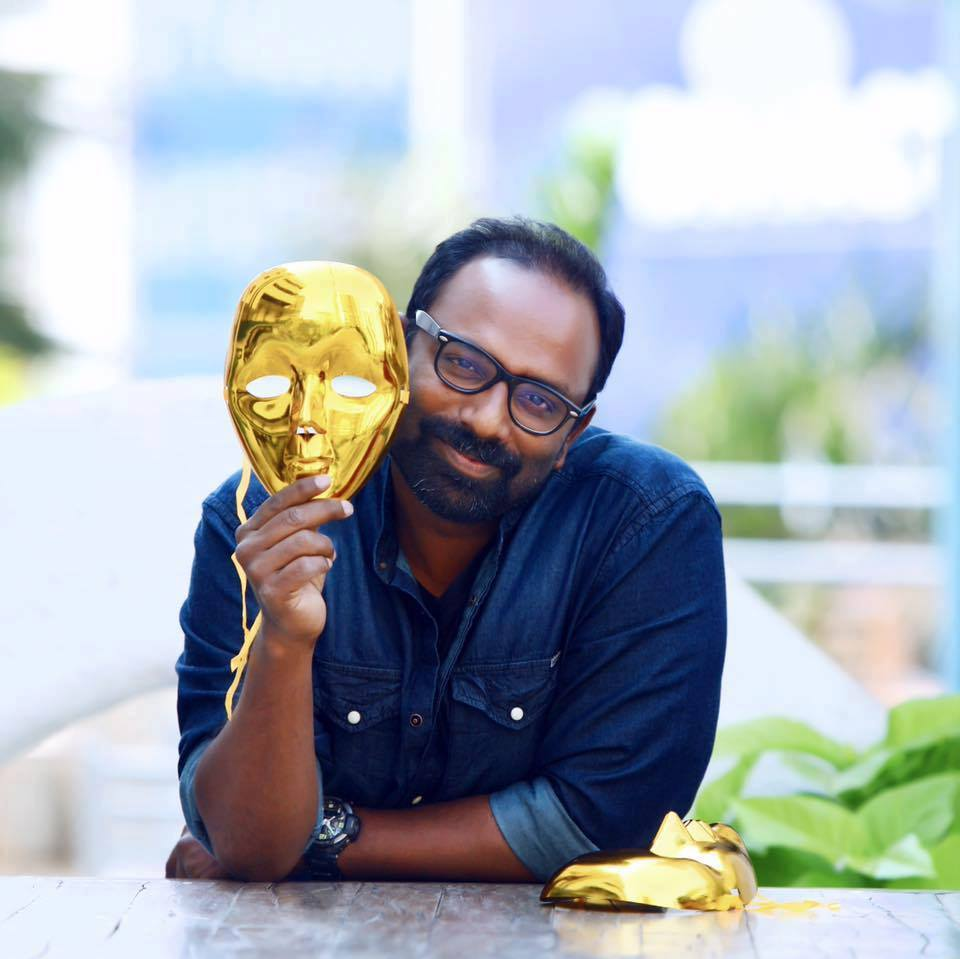
- K.D. Satyam during the Bollywood Diaries shooting at Kolkata
- Born: 29 December 1977 (age 48); Bhilai
- Died: 26 June 2019; Mumbai
- Other name: Satyam
- Occupations: Writer and Director
- Known for: Gattu, Bollywood Diaries

K.D. Satyam (born 29 December 1977) is an Indian film writer and film director. He wrote Gattu, a film that became a part of the list of India's Academy Awards nominations in 2012. He has also written and directed Bollywood Diaries. The film was released on 26 February 2016.

== Early life ==
Satyam was born in Bhilai and graduated from Annamalai University in 2000. He then got a master's degree in Film Direction from Zee Institute of Media Arts and created short-films like Colours of Cinema and Hell or Heaven before starting his career in Bollywood.

== Career ==
Satyam started his Bollywood career as a Making Director for Fox, which was directed by Deepak Tijori and featured Sunny Deol and Arjun Rampal in lead roles. His directorial debut was Admissions Open casting Anupam Kher and Ashish Vidyarthi with music by Amit Trivedi. After that, he wrote Gattu that was directed by Rajan Khosa and produced by the Children's Film Society of India. His next film as writer and director is Bollywood Diaries with Raima Sen, Ashish Vidyarthi and Salim Diwan in title roles.

== Filmography ==
- 2006 Colours of Cinema (short)
- 2008 Hell or Heaven (short)
- 2009 Fox as making Director
- 2010 Admissions Open as director
- 2012 Gattu as writer
- 2016 Bollywood Diaries as writer and director
- 2017 Mukkabaaz (The Brawler) as Screenwriter

== Awards ==
- Gattu had been honored with a special mention at the 62nd the Berlin Film Festival and won another two awards at the Indian Film Festival of Los Angeles.
- Bollywood Diaries received "Special Jury Award" at 2nd International Film festival of Shimla 2016.
- Bollywood Diaries has won Best Feature Film in South Asian Panorama Category at Festival of Globe, San Francisco California.
- Bollywood Diaries has been officially selected for 7th Jagran Film Festival.
