= Koppikar =

Koppikar is a surname. Notable people with the surname include:

- Isha Koppikar (born 1976), Indian actress and politician
- Samira Koppikar (fl. 2010), Indian music director, composer, singer and songwriter
