= NH10 (soundtrack) =

2015 soundtrack album

Soundtrack album by Sanjeev–Darshan, Bann Chakraborty, Ayush Shrestha, Savera Mehta and Samira Koppikar
- Released: 17 February 2015
- Genre: Feature film soundtrack
- Length: 33:05
- Label: Eros Music

NH10 is the soundtrack album to the 2015 film of the same name directed by Navdeep Singh and starred Anushka Sharma, Neil Bhoopalam, Darshan Kumar and Deepti Naval. The soundtrack featured nine songs composed by an assortment of musicians, which includes Sanjeev–Darshan, Bann Chakraborty, Ayush Shrestha, Savera Mehta and Samira Koppikar, and lyrics written by Kumaar, Chakraborty, Abhiruchi Chand, Manoj Tapadia, Neeraj Rajawat and Varun Grover. The soundtrack was released through Eros Music on 17 February 2015 to positive reviews from critics.

== Background ==
The soundtrack of NH10 featured six original songs. Chakraborty composed two original songs, "Le Chal Mujhe" and "Khoney De", each with alternate, instrumental and reprise versions. while the remaining original tracks were composed by Sanjeev–Darshan, Samira Koppikar, Ayush Shreshta and Savera Mehta. Shreshta and Mehta jointly composed two songs, "Main Jo" and "Kya Karein", while Koppikar and Sanjeev–Darshan composed one song each. The lyrics were written by Kumaar, Chakraborty, Abhiruchi Chand, Manoj Tapadia, Neeraj Rajawat and Varun Grover.

Chakraborty was offered to compose the film after being recognised from his work on Vicky Donor. While he was selective about films, he knew about the story of NH10 and had contemplated on working together with Singh for a long time. While taking the theme of the film into account, he composed intense songs that matched the film's emotional context. Much of the singers used were provided the freedom to improvise while recording, and were encouraged to give their input.

== Critical reception ==
The album received mostly positive reviews from critics. T. Sukesh of News18 called it "dark and gloomy" and said that the soundtrack complements the film's story. Joginder Tuteja of Rediff.com wrote that the album has "consistently good music" and is "worth a listen", but felt that it lacked a commercial appeal. Rajiv Vijayakar, in his review for The Financial Express said the soundtrack fits "overall modest expectations". Rucha Sharma of Daily News and Analysis called it a "brilliant album" and "one of the best so far for the year 2015".

Karthik Srinivasan of Milliblog called it a "consistently moody and in-theme" soundtrack. Kasmin Fernandes of The Times of India also complimented the musical styles of the composers and unconventional nature of the soundtrack itself. Suanshu Khurana of The Indian Express noted that the musicians had created "some aural brilliance through anxiety, pathos and love — emotions that begin to breathe life the moment the music begins."

== Track listing ==
No.	Title	Lyrics	Music	Singer(s)	Length
1.	"Chhil Gaye Naina"	Kumaar	Sanjeev–Darshan	Kanika Kapoor, Dipanshu Pandit	3:17
2.	"Le Chal Mujhe" (Male Version)	Bann Chakraborty, Abhiruchi Chand	Bann Chakraborty	Mohit Chauhan	4:13
3.	"Main Jo"	Manoj Tapadia	Ayush Shrestha, Savera Mehta	Nayantara Bhatkal, Savera Mehta	2:44
4.	"Khoney De"	Bann Chakraborty	Bann Chakraborty	Mohit Chauhan, Neeti Mohan	4:25
5.	"Maati Ka Palang"	Neeraj Rajawat	Samira Koppikar	Samira Koppikar	3:11
6.	"Le Chal Mujhe" (Female Version)	Bann Chakraborty, Abhiruchi Chand	Bann Chakraborty	Shilpa Rao	4:13
7.	"Kya Karein"	Varun Grover	Ayush Shrestha, Savera Mehta	Rachel Varghese	3:01
8.	"Le Chal Mujhe" (Reprise Version)	Bann Chakraborty, Abhiruchi Chand	Bann Chakraborty	Arijit Singh, Mohit Chauhan	3:37
9.	"Khoney De" (Instrumental Version)		Bann Chakraborty		4:24
Total length:					33:05

== Accolades ==
Award	Category	Recipients and nominees	Result	Ref.
Mirchi Music Awards	Upcoming Lyricist of The Year	Neeraj Rajawat – ("Maati Ka Palang")	Nominated	
Mirchi Music Awards	Best Song Producer (Programming & Arranging)	Bharat Goel – ("Chhil Gaye Naina")	Nominated	
Global Indian Music Academy Awards	Best Music Debut	Neeraj Rajawat – ("Maati Ka Palang")	Nominated	
