= Dev Agarwal =

Indian cinematographer and director

- Dev Agarwal filming Ghamasaan
- Born: Kolkata, West Bengal, India
- Education: Film and Television Institute of India, Pune
- Occupations: Cinematographer, Director of Photography
- Years active: 2010 - present
- Notable work: CityLights; Bollywood Diaries; Ghamasaan; Vatarani; Bakra Kriket
- Website: www.devagarwaldp.com

Dev Agarwal is an Indian cinematographer based in Mumbai. An alumnus of the Film and Television Institute of India (FTII), his work spans feature films, documentaries, shorts, advertising, and corporate films. He is best known for his cinematography in CityLights directed by Hansal Mehta and starring Rajkummar Rao and Ghamasaan directed by Tigmanshu Dhulia starring Pratik Gandhi & Arshad Warsi. He directed the documentary film Moved by Love, which was screened at Cannes film festival. He was nominated for his work in the international feature film Invasion 1897 at BON awards in West Africa for best cinematography. He filmed an advertising campaign for Manforce Condoms "Shut The Phone Up 3" which won two golds in the Foxglove advertising awards. Dev’s recent work includes Tigmanshu Dhulia’s biopic Ghamasaan, starring Pratik Gandhi and Arshad Warsi, which premiered at the MAMI International Film Festival to strong acclaim. His upcoming projects include the Telugu feature film Vaitarani starring Rashmi Gautam and the Hindi feature Bakra Kriket starring Prit Kamani & Swanand Kirkire.

== Early life and education ==
Dev Agarwal was born in 1984 in Kolkata, West Bengal, India. Growing up in a city rich in cultural heritage, he was exposed to visual arts, theatre, and cinema from an early age, which significantly influenced his later work as a cinematographer. Agarwal pursued his undergraduate studies in Mass Communication and Film Studies at St. Xavier's College, Kolkata. During this time, he began assisting renowned filmmakers such as Govind Nihalani and Anik Dutta, gaining practical experience in the industry. He further honed his skills by obtaining a diploma in photography from the Society of Photographers, Kolkata. He then attended the Film and Television Institute of India (FTII), Pune, where he completed his postgraduate training in cinematography. At FTII, Agarwal received formal grounding in both technical practice and visual theory, shaping his approach to cinematography. Agarwal's visual philosophy is influenced by a diverse range of filmmakers and artists. He draws inspiration from the painterly use of light and color by Vittorio Storaro, the humanist realism of Satyajit Ray, and the socio-political imagery of Ritwik Ghatak and Mrinal Sen. Additionally, he finds influence in Italian neorealism, particularly Vittorio De Sica's Bicycle Thieves, and the visual storytelling of Charlie Chaplin's The Gold Rush. Beyond cinema, Agarwal has acknowledged the impact of impressionist painters such as Claude Monet on his sensitivity to natural light and tonal gradation.

== Career ==
After completing his education, Dev Agarwal began working as a cinematographer on travel documentaries, which took him to various countries across Southeast Asia and beyond. His early documentary work includes Unheard Voices, which focused on the experiences of Tibetan refugees and was screened at multiple film festivals. Another notable documentary, Moved by Love (2015), explored the welfare of abandoned donkeys and was screened at the Cannes Court Métrage section of the Cannes Film Festival. Agarwal made his feature film debut as cinematographer with CityLights (2014), directed by Hansal Mehta and starring Rajkummar Rao. The film, a remake of the BAFTA-nominated British film Metro Manila, received critical acclaim for its storytelling and performances. Critics highlighted Agarwal’s cinematography for its naturalistic lighting, immersive framing, and emotional resonance. He later worked on the international historical drama Invasion 1897 (2014), which earned him a nomination for Best Cinematography at West Africa’s BON Awards. . In addition to feature films, Agarwal has shot advertising campaigns, including the Manforce Condoms campaign Shut The Phone Up 3, which won two Golds at the Foxglove Advertising Awards. . Known for his versatile approach, Agarwal adapts his cinematographic style to the narrative requirements of each project, balancing naturalism with lyrical visual composition. His recent work includes Tigmanshu Dhulia’s biopic Ghamasaan, starring Pratik Gandhi and Arshad Warsi, which premiered at the MAMI International Film Festival. Upcoming projects include the Telugu feature Vaitarni, starring Rashmi Gautam, and Bakra Kriket, produced by Harman Baweja.

== Selected filmography ==
Key
†	Denotes projects that have not yet been released

=== Feature films ===
Year	Title	Director	Artists
2013	Invasion 1897	Lancelot Oduwa Imasuen	Mike Omoregbee & Charles Venn
2014	CityLights	Hansal Mehta	Rajkummar Rao & Patralekha
2016	Bollywood Diaries	K.D.SATYAM	Ashish Vidyarthi&Raima Sen
2022	Masoom Sawaal	Santosh Upadhyay	Nitanshi Goel & Ekavali Khanna
2024	One Last Time	Mohinder Pratap Singh	Amitosh Nagpal & Boloram Das
2026	Ghamasaan	Tigmanshu Dhulia	Pratik Gandhi & Arshad Warsi
2027	'Vaitarani' †	Akhil Babu	Rashmi Gautam & Pradeep Rudra
2027	'Bakra Kriket' †	Rohandeep Singh Bhist	Swanand Kirkire & Prit Kamani

=== Television ===
Miniseries

Year	Title	Director	Episodes
2001	Ruk Jaana Nahi ... Stories of hope with Rajkummar Rao	Shachi Malhotra	8 Episodes

=== Short films ===
Year	Title	Director	Artists
2017	The Bed	Anand Vrs Tomar	Luvya & Momita Pakhi Sarkar
2018	Jutti, the shoe	Mohinder Pratap Singh	Shivani Raghuvanshi & Vishwas kini
2018	I am sorry	Ashwini Chaudhary	Ritika Singh
2019	Manforce Condoms - Shut the phone up 3	Vivek Daschaudhary	Vartika Tiwari
2022	The Waiting	Lalit Kumar Jha & Sumit Kohli	Rajit Kapur Zarina WahabBhuvan Arora & Bidita Bag
2023	The Last envelope	Lalit Kumar Jha	Annu Kapoor & Sheeba Chaddha

Additional Cinematography

Year	Title	Director	Credit
2014	Tubelight	Kabir Khan	second unit cinematography
2019	Criminal Justice (Indian TV series)	Tigmanshu Dhulia	additional cinematography

Documentary film

Year	Title	Director	Cinematographer
2012	Unheard Voices and notes to myself	Dev Agarwal	Dev Agarwal
2014	Light from many lamps: beyond the last rainbow	Dev Agarwal	Dev Agarwal
2015	Everest: the other side of belief	Dev Agarwal	Dev Agarwal
2015	Moved by love	Dev Agarwal	Dev Agarwal
2018	Madhubani... the station of colours	Kamlesh Mishra	Dev Agarwal
2020	Delhi Riots... A Tale of Burn & Blame	Kamlesh Mishra	Dev Agarwal
2020	Under 25 summit... Building a generation	Dev Agarwal	Ravi B Ranjan Sharma
2022	Dil ki Police	Kamlesh Mishra	Dev Agarwal
2025	Riderboy	Mohinder Pratap Singh	Dev Agarwal
2025	Kakori	Kamlesh Mishra	Dev Agarwal
