= The Disappearance of Alice Creed =

2009 film by J Blakeson

- Theatrical release poster
- Directed by: J Blakeson
- Written by: J Blakeson
- Produced by: Adrian Sturges
- Starring: Gemma Arterton; Martin Compston; Eddie Marsan
- Cinematography: Philipp Blaubach
- Edited by: Mark Eckersley
- Music by: Marc Canham
- Production companies: Isle of Man Film; CinemaNX
- Distributed by: West End Films
- Release dates: 12 September 2009 (TIFF); 30 April 2010 (United Kingdom)
- Running time: 100 minutes
- Country: United Kingdom
- Language: English
- Budget: $1.5 million
- Box office: £554,832

The Disappearance of Alice Creed is a 2009 British neo-noir crime thriller film written and directed by J Blakeson. It is about the kidnapping of a young woman (Gemma Arterton) by two ex-convicts (Martin Compston and Eddie Marsan). The film was shot on the Isle of Man.

== Plot ==
Criminals Vic and Danny kidnap a woman named Alice Creed, the only child of a wealthy family. In a secured room, they forcibly strip her of all her clothes, handcuff her to a bed, and gag her – all while wearing jumpsuits and ski masks themselves. After taking pictures of her they put a tracksuit on her and a hood over her head. The men leave to dispose of all three's clothes and send the pictures to Alice's father for ransom. The men refuse to let her out of her shackles, even to go to the toilet, seemingly just to embarrass her. Neither shows emotion while humiliating Alice, but Vic mocks Danny for being less calm.

Vic leaves to make preparations, whilst Danny guards Alice. Alice persuades Danny to uncuff her, then grabs his pistol and fires a warning shot. To keep from being shot, Danny removes his ski mask and reveals he is her former lover. He says he met Vic while in prison and chose her as their victim. Danny plans to double-cross Vic and offers to start a new life with Alice and the money. As Vic returns, Alice agrees to go along with Danny's plan and be tied back up. Danny tries and fails to dispose of the spent bullet casing in the toilet, ultimately forcing himself to swallow it when Vic beats down the door. The two then discuss their plans to run away together after collecting the ransom and share a passionate kiss, revealing they were lovers in prison.

Later, when Vic is away again, Alice seduces Danny and handcuffs him to the bed, but finds the door bolted shut when she tries to escape. She finds a mobile phone and dials 999 but is unable to tell the operator where she is. She threatens Danny with his gun for the front door keys. Danny tells her they are in his pocket and knocks her out when she tries to retrieve them. Vic returns and says the exchange is on. Danny leaves the two and goes to the van.

Vic finds the mobile phone and sees the 999 call as well as the bullet hole in the wall. He ungags and threatens her. She screams for Danny, then tells Vic that Danny intends to double-cross him. Vic is shocked by the betrayal. When Danny returns, Vic says he feels something is 'not right', but Danny does not reveal anything. They inject Alice with a sedative and take her to a deserted, rural warehouse where they chain her in a back room. Vic asks Danny for his keys to the locks and drives him to the woods to pick up the ransom. There, Vic confronts Danny and threatens to kill both him and Alice. He says the hole they dug for the ransom is now for Danny. Danny flees, and Vic shoots him. Although wounded, Danny manages to hide. Vic retrieves the ransom elsewhere and returns for Alice. As he tries to inject her again, Danny appears and grabs his gun. During the standoff, Alice learns of Vic and Danny's true relationship.

Danny shoots Vic point blank and, to Alice's horror, leaves her in the dark and handcuffed to the railing next to the dying man. However, Vic revives long enough to throw the keys to her. She frees herself and staggers out of the warehouse. Outside, Alice finds a car a short distance up the road, with the ransom on the passenger seat and Danny dead in the driver's seat. She drives off with the money.

== Cast ==
- Gemma Arterton as Alice Creed
- Martin Compston as Danny
- Eddie Marsan as Vic

== Filming ==
The film was shot on the Isle of Man and was largely filmed over four weeks in chronological order. Arterton insisted on being handcuffed to the bed even when not being filmed to help her performance. She joked that, because she can be quite the chatterbox, the crew used the gag prop to stop her chatting on set.

== Soundtrack ==
The score for the film was composed by Marc Canham and was his first film music having previously worked on music for video games. The piano, strings, and some of the percussion were recorded at Abbey Road Studios in London, whilst the remainder was recorded at Carnham's studio in Oxfordshire. The only other music used on the soundtrack was the song "Holy Moly" by Cathy Davey.

== Release ==
The film was screened at the 2009 London Film Festival, the 2009 Toronto International Film Festival, and the Tribeca Film Festival in 2010.

After a well-publicised Facebook campaign to choose a cinema to host the World Premiere of the film, Southampton University Student's Union won the event, which took place on 20 April 2010.

=== Critical reception ===
The Disappearance of Alice Creed holds an 81% approval rating on Rotten Tomatoes, based on 100 reviews. According to Metacritic, which sampled the opinions of 19 critics and calculated a score of 65 out of 100, the film received "generally favorable reviews".

The film has received a number of four star ratings in the UK press. Peter Bradshaw at The Guardian made the following comment about the much discussed plot twists: "There's twist and counter-twist, cross and double-cross, and with each narrative reveal comes a firework display of Big Acting". It was well received at the Toronto International Film Festival (TIFF). Cameron Bailey, co-director of TIFF, praised J Blakeson's directorial style, claiming that "Not since Reservoir Dogs has a hostage standoff been handled with such intelligence".

The film was nominated for the Raindance Award at the 2009 British Independent Film Awards.

== Home media ==
The film was released on DVD in the UK on 4 October 2010.

== Remakes ==
In 2014, the Dutch-language remake Reckless was the opening film of the Netherlands Film Festival. The film closely follows the plot and structure of The Disappearance of Alice Creed.

In 2018, Echcharikkai an Indian crime thriller produced by Sundar Annamalai was inspired by The Disappearance of Alice Creed

In 2019, Netflix released Kidnapping Stella, a German remake of The Disappearance of Alice Creed. The film, directed by Thomas Sieben, centers around the abduction of Stella (Jella Haase) by Vic (Clemens Schick) and Tom (Max von der Groeben).

In 2024, Aliya Basu Gayab Hai a direct Indian remake directed by Preeti Singh and centers around the abduction of Aliya Basu played by Raima Sen.

The film follows the setup of the Italian abducting exploitation film La Orca with some plot variations.
