= Laal Kaptaan =

2019 Indian film by Navdeep Singh

- Theatrical release poster
- Directed by: Navdeep Singh
- Screenplay by: Deepak Venkateshan; Navdeep Singh
- Dialogues by: Sudip Sharma
- Produced by: Sunil Lulla; Anand L. Rai
- Starring: Saif Ali Khan; Manav Vij; Zoya Hussain; Sonakshi Sinha
- Cinematography: Shanker Raman
- Edited by: Jabeen Merchant
- Music by: Songs: Samira Koppikar; Background Score: Benedict Taylor; Naren Chandavarkar
- Production companies: Colour Yellow Productions; Eros International
- Distributed by: Eros International
- Release date: 18 October 2019
- Running time: 155 minutes
- Country: India
- Language: Hindi
- Budget: est. ₹30-40 crore
- Box office: est. ₹2.36 crore

Laal Kaptaan (transl. Red Captain) is 2019 Indian Hindi-language epic western action drama film co-written and directed by Navdeep Singh. It was produced by Eros International and Aanand L Rai's Colour Yellow Productions. The film stars Saif Ali Khan as a bounty hunter called Gossain (a sadhu) who goes on a killing spree with the intention of exacting revenge upon a Subedar named Rahmat Khan, who is also being chased by the Marathas since he double crossed them and was trying to get away with their treasure. The film co-stars Manav Vij, Zoya Hussain and Deepak Dobriyal.

The film was released theatrically in India on 18 October 2019.

== Plot ==
In the late 18th century Bundelkhand, a warrior monk (called the Gossain) goes on a killing spree of bandits in a quest to find his arch-nemesis, the Rohilla chieftain, Rahmat Khan (currently in charge of the local fort of Munerghah), who has escaped with his convoy after looting treasure of his overlord Raja Hukum Singh Bundela (the looted treasure is tax due to Peshwa Sawai Madhavrao) and killing all the subjects. In the meanwhile, a tracker helps a rival find the Gossain. In the ensuing fight, the Gossain kills the rival and his subordinates but is himself wounded. He manages to reach Rahmat Khan's palace, where a widow rescues him, feeds, and accompanies him on his vengeance trail. The Gossain doesn't want her to accompany him, but after some men threaten her, he kills one of them and allows her till the Yamuna River. On the other hand, the tracker joins forces with the Marathas to help them track Rahmat Khan in exchange for 20 gold coins. The next morning, the commander remains asleep, due to which the captain and the tracker are accompanied by a group of Pindaris. The Gossain and the widow then meet with the former's Naga Guru, who tries to convince him not to continue with the revenge spree. The Gossain reveals that six years ago, in Banda, he saved Rahmat Khan and his wife from a dacoit attack before revealing his intention to kill Rahmat Khan. After that, Gossain couldn't find him. After departing, the pair locate Rahmat Khan and his convoy. At night, the Gossain tries to attack Rahmat Khan but is captured, and the widow is revealed to have betrayed him.

The widow is Rahmat Khan's concubine, who also gave birth to his son now under his wife's possession. The tracker leads the captain and the Pindaris to the spot where Rahmat Khan and his friend Adham Khan are meeting a British East India Company official – Theodore Munroe, to buy new guns. The greedy Pindaris try to attack them but retreat when a few of them are killed by the British sepoys' guns. A tortured Gossain reveals a man named Sadullah Khan sent him, a name that shocks Rahmat Khan. At night, the tracker, the captain, and the Pindaris are joined by other Maratha soldiers of Mahadaji Shinde. The Gossain attacks the British official, following which Rahmat Khan tries to blind him, but suddenly the Marathas attack the camp. The widow escapes with the child, and the Gossain survives the attack but promises to return. He refuses to trust the widow who betrayed him for the sake of her child. As a result, she is captured, and Rahmat Khan kills his wife when she insults his child. The Gossain is now joined by the tracker, who was left unpaid by the Marathas. The Gossain reveals that 25 years ago in Buxar, before the battle, various Indians gathered to plot the East India Company's defeat. Sadullah Khan was among them, but he was betrayed by his older son Rahmat Khan who was joined by Adham Khan. Sadullah Khan was hanged to death, and so was his younger son, who left Rahmat Khan scarred in a violent attack.

Back to the present, Rahmat Khan kills Adham Khan, believing him to be conspiring against his child. Soon, the tracker attacks both the British and Rahmat Khan's forces with the help of improvised rockets. Rahmat Khan attempts to escape with his son, the widow and his followers with the treasure by crossing the river on a platform boat. The British flee, while Gossain himself emerges out of the river and attacks the people on board. He jumps into the water along with Rahmat Khan, before the tracker fires another rocket, and the boat explodes. Only the widow and her child survive. The Marathas arrive, and the tracker departs after informing them of the treasure's sinking along with the boat. Before hanging Rahmat Khan, Gossain reveals himself to be his younger brother who didn't die despite being hanged due to putting in his throat a tiny metal pipe for air circulation by an older warrior monk. He was found alive and taken in by the Naga Sadhus. Before being hanged, Rahmat Khan tells him his son would avenge him in the future. Gossain responds by saying "On that day, I will attain mukti from this world."

The dying widow hands over her child to Gossain, who takes him and rides away.

== Cast ==
- Saif Ali Khan as The Hunter / The Gossain
  - Rudra Soni as Young Gossain
- Deepak Dobriyal as The Tracker
- Zoya Hussain as The Widow
- Manav Vij as Rahmat Khan
  - Abhishek Madrecha as Young Rehmat
- Neeraj Kabi as Sadullah Khan
- Dog 1 as Sukhiram, who eats boti (meat)
- Dog 2 as Dukhiram, who eats goti (testis)
- Aamir Bashir as Adham Khan
- Simone Singh as Begum
- Madan Deodhar as Maratha captain
- Vibha Rani as Laal Pari
- Sonakshi Sinha as Noor Bai (cameo)
- Henry Douthwaite as Theodore Munro
- Chetan Hansraj as Sangram Singh
- Hariom Kalra as Gobind Mal
- Ajay Paul Singh as Thakur
- Saurabh Sachdeva as Mughal general

== Production ==
R. Madhavan suffered a shoulder injury during the making of the film, and subsequently pulled out of the production. He was later replaced by Deepak Dobriyal.

== Soundtrack ==
Laal Kaptaan

Soundtrack album by Samira Koppikar
- Released: 9 October 2019
- Recorded: 2019
- Genre: Feature film soundtrack
- Length: 13:03
- Label: Eros Music

Samira Koppikar chronology
| Bareilly Ki Barfi (2017) | Laal Kaptaan (2019) |
External audio
- Official Audio Jukebox on YouTube

The music of the film is composed by Samira Koppikar with lyrics written by Saurabh Jain, Puneet Sharma, and Sahib.

Track listing
| No. | Title | Lyrics | Singer(s) | Length |
|---|---|---|---|---|
| 1. | "Kaal Kaal" | Saurabh Jain | Brijesh Shandilya, Dino James | 4:14 |
| 2. | "Red Red Najariya" | Saurabh Jain | Shreya Ghoshal | 2:47 |
| 3. | "Taandav" | Puneet Sharma | Kailash Kher, Brijesh Shandilya | 3:10 |
| 4. | "Lahu Ka Rang Kara" | Sahib | Samira Koppikar | 2:52 |
| Total length: | | | | 13:03 |

== Release ==
Previously it was stated to schedule on 6 September. Then it was shifted to 11 October 2019. Finally, it was released theatrically on 18 October 2019. It was made available for streaming on the online platform Amazon Prime Video.

=== Critical reception ===
On Rotten Tomatoes, the film has scored 11% based on nine reviews with an average rating of 4.4/10. The film generally received negative reviews from the critics but praising the performance of Khan, the direction, the visuals and the cinematography. Sreeparna Sengupta writing for the Times of India, said that "[Laal Kaptaan] has a tedious narrative and a very lengthy runtime pull it down." and gave it 2.5 stars. She also went on to appreciate Saif Ali Khan's performance as the Gossain. Saibal Chatterjee of NDTV gave it 2.5 stars. Writing for India Today, Nairita Mukherjee wrote that 'Laal Kaptaan's biggest flaw is that it is too heavily dependent on Saif, but doesn't offer the necessary support for him to pull it through. Ultimately, it remains a film that had all the right ingredients but is still under-cooked.'

=== Awards ===
| Award | Date of ceremony | Category | Recipient(s) | Result |
|---|---|---|---|---|
| Filmfare Awards | 15 February 2020 | Best Costume Design | Maxima Basu | Nominated |
| Mirchi Music Awards | 19 February 2020 | Upcoming Lyricist of the Year | Sahib (for Lahu Ka Rang Kara) | Won |

== See also ==
- List of Asian historical drama films
