= Hussain Haidry =

Indian poet

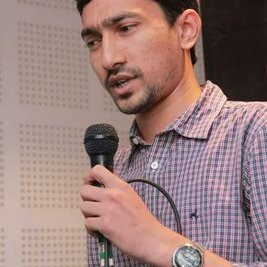
- Born: Indore, Madhya Pradesh, India
- Education: Indian Institute of Management Indore
- Occupations: Poet, Writer, Lyricist
- Years active: 2016–present

Hussain Haidry is an Indian spoken word poet, writer and lyricist. He gained prominence for his spoken word poem titled, "Hindustani Musalmaan". He has written lyrics for the Bollywood films Gurgaon, Qarib Qarib Single, Mukkabaaz and Taish.

== Early life ==
Hussain Haidry is a Dawoodi Bohra, and was born in Indore where he attended Shri Satya Sai Vidhya Vihar school which imparted a secular way of life to him and went on to become a chartered accountant. He later obtained a PGDM from the Indian Institute of Management Indore and worked as head of finance at a healthcare company in Kolkata. However, in December 2015 he left his job and moved to Mumbai to become a full-time lyricist and screenwriter.

== Career ==
After leaving his job in Kolkata, Hussain started his career by performing at spoken word poetry forums in Mumbai such as Kommune, The Poetry Club, Prithvi Caferati and Words Tell Stories. However, he first gained prominence when his poem 'Hindustani Musalmaan' went viral on social media. He was subsequently invited on the NDTV show The Buck Stops Here. He also appeared in an interview with Ravish Kumar on the same channel's Prime Time for his poem.

Hussain's first film as a lyricist was Qarib Qarib Single, for which he wrote two songs. The first released film featuring him as a lyricist, however, was Gurgaon. He wrote two songs for it, Tamasha and Aiyyash Chor, as solo pieces and Udi in collaboration with Varun Grover. He also wrote the lyrics for the film Mukkabaaz which premiered at the Mumbai Film Festival in 2017. He wrote seven out of ten songs in the film, which were composed by Rachita Arora. Two of his songs, Bahut Hua Sammaan and Chhipkali, were much appreciated for their political tone.

He has also written the title song of the Amazon web series, Chacha Vidhayak Hain Humare, composed by Vishal Dadlani. His latest work as a lyricist in the album of the second season of the web series TVF Tripling has also been appreciated, especially the song "Ishq Ka Haafiz".

As a screenwriter, he has co-written the story, screenplay, and dialogue for the Amazon Web Series, Laakhon Mein Ek (Season 2) along with Biswa Kalyan Rath and Abhishek Sengupta. It is a show about how a young doctor gets embroiled in the system of public healthcare in India, and it was well received in several reviews.

He has also co-written the short film titled Madhyantar, along with Abhishek Chaubey in the Netflix short film anthology, Ankahi Kahaniyan. In several reviews, Madhyantar stood out as the best short film in the anthology.

He has also written dialogues for Aparna Sen's award-winning film The Rapist.

== Filmography ==
Title	Year	Credited as	Notes	Ref
Gurgaon	2016	Lyricist		
Qarib Qarib Single	2017	Lyricist		
Mukkabaaz	2018	Lyricist		
Laakhon Mein Ek Season 2	2019	Writer		
Sherni	2021	Lyricist	Amazon Prime Video film	
Ankahi Kahaniya	2021	Writer	Netflix Anthology film	
The Rapist	2021	Dialogue Writer		
Dobaaraa	2022	Lyricist		
I Love You	2023	Lyricist	JioCinema film	
