= J Blakeson =

English film director and screenwriter

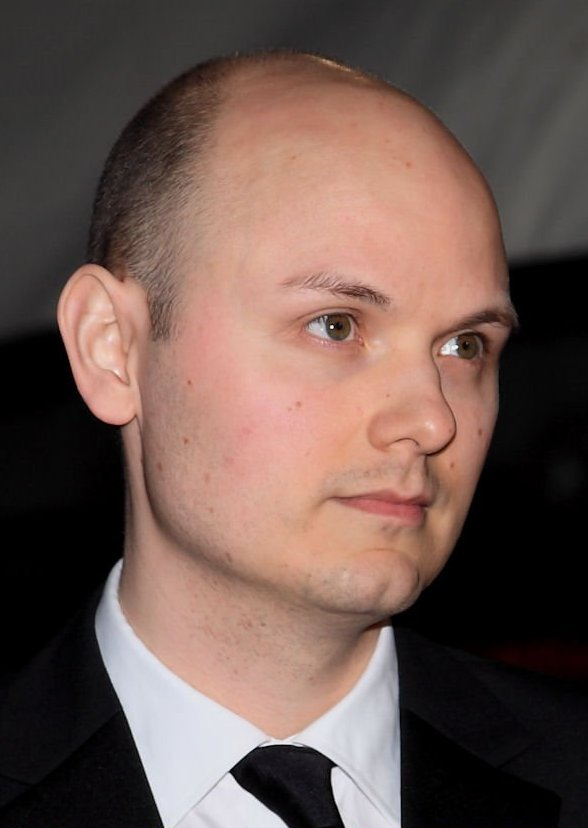
- Blakeson in 2011
- Born: Harrogate, England, UK
- Years active: 2005–present

Jonathan "J" Blakeson is an English filmmaker.

== Early life ==
Blakeson was born and raised in Harrogate, North Yorkshire. He attended and graduated from the University of Warwick, where he studied Film and Literature. Outside studying, he oversaw the writing and direction of two low-budget short films, Struggling (1997) and Red Tape (1998).

== Career ==
Blakeson directed The 5th Wave, based on the novel of the same name by Rick Yancey. Chloë Grace Moretz played Cassie, and Susannah Grant wrote the screenplay. The movie made over $109 million at the global box office. Blakeson directed the miniseries Gunpowder starring Kit Harington, Liv Tyler, Mark Gatiss, Peter Mullan and Shaun Dooley. It was shown on BBC One in the UK and on HBO in the U.S. Blakeson's next feature film was I Care a Lot, which was released on Netflix in 2021 and featured a Golden Globe Award-winning lead performance from Rosamund Pike. He then wrote and directed Culprits, a 2023 crime thriller series for Disney+.

== Filmography ==
Short film

Year	Title	Director	Writer
2005	Vernic	No	Yes
2005	Pitch Perfect	Yes	Yes
2009	The Appointment	Yes	Yes

Feature film

Year	Title	Director	Writer	Producer
2009	The Descent Part 2	No	Yes	No
2009	The Disappearance of Alice Creed	Yes	Yes	No
2016	The 5th Wave	Yes	No	No
2020	I Care a Lot	Yes	Yes	Yes
2024	Aliya Basu Gayab Hai	No	Story	No
TBA	Sweat	Yes	No	Yes

Television

Year	Title	Director	Writer	Notes
2006	Mist: The Tale of a Sheepdog Puppy	No	Yes	TV movie
2017	Gunpowder	Yes	No	Miniseries
2023	Culprits	Yes	Yes	
