= GiMA Award for Best Duo/Group Song =

The GiMA Best Duo/Group Song is given by Global Indian Music Academy as a part of its annual Global Indian Music Academy Awards. This award started from 2016.

== List of winners ==
- 2016 Brijesh Shandilya & Swati Sharma for "Banno" – Tanu Weds Manu Returns
  - Shreya Ghoshal & Vaishali Mhade for "Pinga" – Bajirao Mastani
  - Arijit Singh & Tulsi Kumar for "Soch Na Sake" – Airlift
  - Armaan Malik & Neeti Mohan for "Tumhe Apna Banane Ka" – Hate Story 3
  - Sonu Nigam & Shreya Ghoshal for "Tere Bin" – Wazir
  - Priya Saraiya & Divya Kumar for "Sun Saathiya" - ABCD 2

== See also ==
- Bollywood
- Cinema of India
