= Preeti Singh (director) =

Indian film director

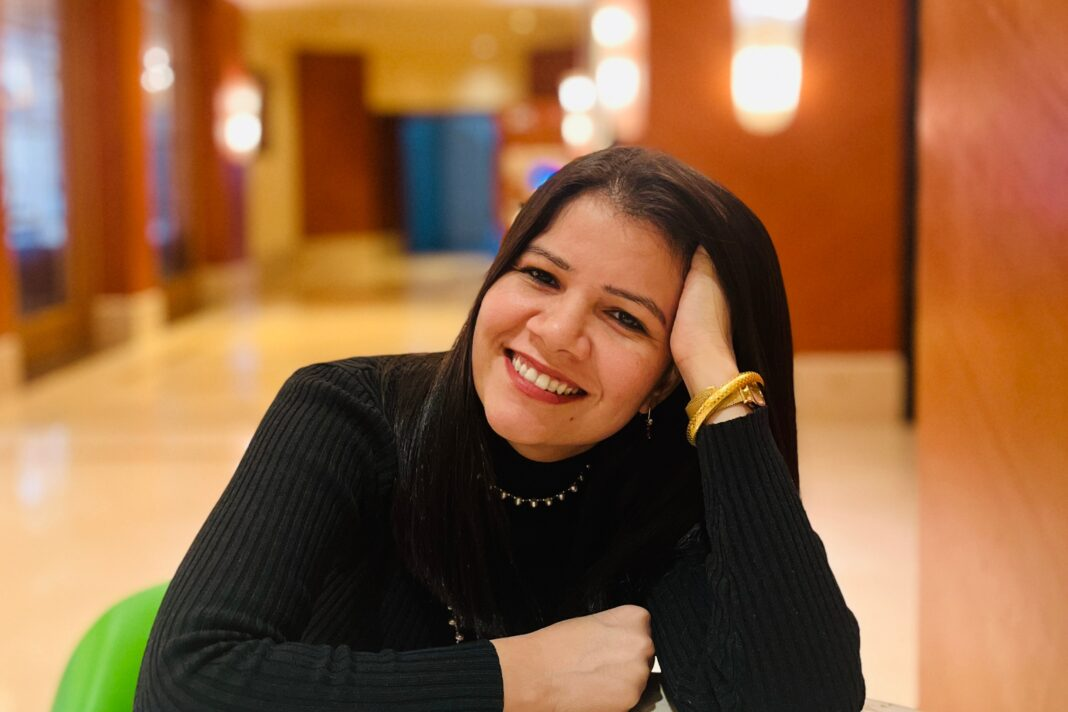
- Born: 24 May 1987 (age 38); Mathura, Uttar Pradesh, India
- Occupations: Film director; screenwriter
- Years active: 2012—present
- Known for: Bollywood Diaries, Aliya Basu Gayab Hai

Preeti Singh is an Indian film director, screenwriter and producer.

== Filmography ==
Year	Film	Director	Writer	Producer
2012	Prague	No	No	Executive producer
2016	Bollywood Diaries	No	No	Co-producer
2016	Meri Awaaz Hi Pehchaan Hai	Co-director	Yes	No
2016	Dom (short film)	Yes	Yes	Yes
2020	The Lovers (short film)	Yes	Yes	No
2024	Aliya Basu Gayab Hai	Yes	No	No
