= Meri Awaaz Hi Pehchaan Hai =

Indian television series

- Genre: Musical; Drama
- Written by: Bhavani Iyer; Preeti Singh; Soham Abhiram; Reena Pareek
- Creative director: Sheetal Kolvalkar Rakesh Ravikant Tak
- Starring: Amrita Rao; Jannat Zubair Rahmani; Deepti Naval; Mehnaaz Maan; Aditi Vasudev; Zarina Wahab; Pallavi Joshi
- Country of origin: India
- Original language: Hindi
- No. of seasons: 1
- No. of episodes: 95

Production
- Producer: Nivedita Basu
- Production locations: Mumbai, India
- Camera setup: Single-camera
- Running time: 23 minutes approx.
- Production company: The House of Originals

Original release
- Network: &TV
- Release: 7 March – 15 July 2016

Meri Awaaz Hi Pehchaan Hai (English: My voice is my identity) is an Indian musical drama television series, which premiered on 7 March 2016 on &TV. It is produced by a brand new production company The House of Originals of Nivedita Basu.

Amrita Rao and Aditi Vasudev along with Deepti Naval and Zarina Wahab played the lead roles. The story showed three generations of two sisters whose lives revolve around music.

The show ended on 15 July 2016 and was replaced by Tere Bin.

== Plot ==
The story is told by Devika Gaikwad, mother of Kalyani and Ketaki, two sisters who grew together and had the same passion for singing, faced many troubles, struggles, were repeatedly deceived in their personal lives and finally achieved immense success; but later had differences, misunderstandings which led their separation for a good 21 years.

In the last episode they reconcile forgetting the differences and the show ends on a good note.

== Cast ==
- Jannat Zubair Rahmani / Amrita Rao / Deepti Naval as Kalyani Gaikwad
- Mehnaaz Maan / Aditi Vasudev / Zarina Wahab as Ketaki Gaikwad
- Pallavi Joshi as Devika Gaikwad aka Aai, Kalyani and Ketaki's mother
- Suhita Thatte as Dadi/Aaji
- Eijaz Khan as Vikrant Khanna
- Rituraj Singh as Sohrab Mistry
- Salma Agha as Singer Nayantara Devi
- Reshmi Ghosh as Protima Bose
- Aditya Redij as Karan Kapoor
- Bhanu Uday as Rajaram Gaikwad
- Anant Jog
