= Gattu =

- Directed by: Rajan khosa
- Screenplay by: Ankur Tewari; K.D.Satyam; Rajan Khosa
- Story by: K.D. Satyam
- Produced by: Children's Film Society, India
- Starring: Mohammad Samad; Zoya Arshad; Harshit Kaushik; Sarvasva Singh Pundir; Jayanta Das
- Cinematography: Satya Rai Nagpaul
- Edited by: Antara Lahiri
- Music by: Sandesh Shandilya
- Distributed by: Rajshri Media
- Release date: 20 July 2012; (India)
- Running time: 90 minutes
- Country: India
- Language: Hindi

Gattu is a 2012 Indian film written by K.D. Satyam and directed by Rajan Khosa and line produced by Yamini Upadhye. The film was entirely filmed with local primary govt school children in the town of Roorkee in Uttarakhand, India. The film stars Mohammad Samad, Naresh Kumar, Zoya Arshad, Harshit Kaushik, Sarvasva Singh Pundir, and Jayanta Das. It premiered on 14 November 2011 at the 17th International Children's Festival of India held in Hyderabad. Gattu had its theatrical release in India on 20 July 2012.

== Plot ==
Gattu is a nine-year-old orphan who works in his uncle's recycling business and is fascinated by flying kites, especially the kite Kali which has won many kite flying competitions. Gattu's desire to defeat the black kite leads him to pretend to be a student at a prestigious school. He builds a false reputation to impress his classmates while keeping his dream of conquering the black kite alive.

== Cast ==
- Mohammad Samad as Gattu
- Naresh Kumar as Anees Bhai
- Jayanta Das as School Principal
- Zoya Arshad as Minky
- Harshit Kaushik as Manoj
- Sarvasva Singh Pundir as Honey Singh
- Mohit Pandey as Sulaiman
- Mohammad Shoaib as Chawanni
- Mohammad Talha Sadat as Tailor Master
- Ritika Kumar as Sunita
- Naveen Bhatt as Kareem

== Recognition ==
Gattu opened at the 17th International Children's Film Festival in Hyderabad. This film was held in high regard by critics and film reviewers all over the world. The film received a special mention under the Deutsches Kinderhilfswerk category at the 62nd Berlin International Film Festival. It is one of the few Bollywood films to receive such acclaim. At the Indian Film Festival of Los Angeles in 2012, Gattu won the Audience Choice Award for Best Feature and the Honorable Mention of the Jury Award. At the 12th Annual New York Indian Film Festival, Gattu won an award in the best Film category, and its lead actor Mohammad Samad won an award for Best Young Actor.

== Critical reception ==
DearCinema.com critic Nandita Dutta wrote that "Although Gattu works around the regular elements of children’s stories, it turns out to be an endearing tale of a little boy who is passionate about flying kites." Mansha Rastogi of Now Running gave the movie 4/5 stars, saying that "Gattu is yet another gem that Hindi film industry can be proud of. A definite watch for people of all age groups." NDTV review called it, "a delicately-threaded morality tale ", Anupama Chopra of Hindustan Times gave it 3.5/5 stars, while Prayag Arora Desai of Rediff gave the movie 3.5/5 stars, concluding that "Gattu is a must-watch for all but most especially cynics who believe 'there is no hope for any of us'. It took Gattu just a little less than two hours to prove it."

Madhureeta Mukherjee of The Times of India gave the movie 3.5/5 stars, stating that "Gattu is a must-watch for children of all ages (read: grown-ups even more). And if you think you're too grown-up for a kiddie film, go fly a kite. Maybe that's the real trouble with the world, too many people grow up too soon. We should just let the little one's in us rule the world.". Subhash K Jha of Indicine gave the movie 3/5 stars, saying that "Gattu carries forward the recent trend of sensible, intelligent funny and moving films about child protagonists, namely Taare Zameen Par, I Am Kalam and Stanley Ka Dabba. Add one more film to that luminous list of cinema on little wonders." Blessy Chettiar of DNA India gave the movie 3/5 stars, stating that "Gattu scores high on the emotional quotient. It leaves you with a smile on your face." Taran Adarsh of Bollywood Hungama gave the movie 3/5 stars, concluding that "On the whole, a film like GATTU speaks to both, the kids and adults. Films like these, which aren't made to appease the box office, but cater to a different audience, ought to be encouraged. For, there's life beyond zany entertainers as well!"
