= Aliya Basu Gayab Hai =

2024 Indian film by Preeti Singh

- Directed by: Preeti Singh
- Written by: J Blakeson; Gibran Noorani
- Produced by: Sattar Diwan; Jonu Rana
- Starring: Salim Diwan; Vinay Pathak; Raima Sen
- Cinematography: Arvind Yadav
- Edited by: Amit Kumar; Girish Kumar Singh
- Music by: Mannan Munjal
- Production company: Rehab Pictures Private Limited
- Distributed by: Cinépolis
- Release date: 9 August 2024 (Maharashtra)
- Running time: 103 minutes
- Country: India
- Language: Hindi

Aliya Basu Gayab Hai is a 2024 Indian Hindi -language film directed by Preeti Singh and produced by Rehab Pictures Private Limited. The film stars Salim Diwan, Vinay Pathak and Raima Sen. It is the remake of the 2009 British film The Disappearance of Alice Creed.

== Cast ==
- Salim Diwan as Deepak
- Vinay Pathak as Vikram
- Raima Sen as Aliya Basu

== Production ==
The trailer was released on 24 July 2024.

== Release ==
The film was theatrically released on 9 August 2024 in all over India.

=== Streaming rights ===
The streaming rights of this movie were acquired by Lionsgate Play and starts to stream on from 19 June 2026 in Hindi and Bengali languages.

== Soundtrack ==
The background score and music is composed by Mannan Munjal while the lyrics is written by Dr. Sagar.

Track listing
No.	Title	Singer (s)	Length
1.	"Oye Sun Be"	Neha Karode	2:59

== Reception ==
Ganesh Aaglave of the Firstpost stated in his review that "Aliya Basu Gayab Hai, excels in creating a tense, suspenseful environment, bolstered by standout performances and innovative storytelling" Ronak Kotecha of The Times of India rated 3.5 stars out of 5 and said that ‘Aliya Basu Gayab Hai’ may not revolutionise the thriller genre, but it knows how to play its cards right.
