= Dance of the Wind =

- DVD cover
- Directed by: Rajan Khosa
- Written by: Robin Mukherjee; Rajan Khosa
- Story by: Rajan Khosa
- Produced by: Karl Baumgartner
- Starring: Kitu Gidwani; Bhaveen Gosain
- Cinematography: Piyush Shah
- Edited by: Emma Matthews
- Music by: Shubha Mudgal
- Production companies: NFDC; Elephant Eye; Pandora Filmproduktion; JBA Production; Monsoon Films Private Limited
- Distributed by: NFDC
- Release dates: 1 September 1997 (Venice); 1 July 1999 (India)
- Running time: 85 minutes
- Countries: India; Germany; United Kingdom; France
- Languages: Hindi; English

Dance of the Wind (Swara Mandal) is a 1997 Hindi-language drama film co-written and directed by Rajan Khosa, in his feature-length directorial debut, and starring Kitu Gidwani and Bhaveen Gosain in lead roles.

== Synopsis ==
Pallavi (Kitu Gidwani), a budding Indian classical singer, is the daughter and student of celebrated classical singer, Karuna Devi (Kapila Vatsyayan). While she was still gaining her confidence, her mother dies suddenly; due this shock Pallavi loses not just her bearings, but also her voice. Subsequently, she also loses her career, her students, and her husband (Bhaveen Gosain).

It is only after she meets a young street urchin, Tara (Roshan Bano) and start teaching her, following the guru–shishya parampara (master–student tradition) of Indian classical music, as her mother once did with her, does she begin to finds herself again, and also her voice.

== Cast ==
- Ami Arora as Janaki
- Roshan Bano as Tara
- Kitu Gidwani as Pallavi Sehgal
- Bhaveen Gossain as Ranmal
- Vinod Nagpal as Mr Thakkar
- B.C. Sanyal as Munir Baba
- Abbas Tyrewala as Shabda
- Kapila Vatsyayan as Karuna Devi

== Soundtrack ==
Noted Hindustani classical singer Shubha Mudgal composed the music, while playback was given by Shweta Jhaveri, Shanti Hirannand, and Brinda Roy Choudhuri. Other noted artists who worked on soundtrack were Sarangi performer Ustad Sultan Khan and noted flautist Ronu Majumdar. The film went on to win the 'Gold Plaque for Music' at the 1998 Chicago International Film Festival.

== Reception ==
The film was premiered at the Critics' Week at 1997 Venice Film Festival, and became India's official entry at the Karlovy Vary International Film Festival, Melbourne International Film Festival, Jerusalem Film Festival and International Film Festival of India (IFFI) in 1998. The film went on to win several national and international awards in the following years, as it was theatrically released in twenty five countries in 1998-2001. However, it was commercially released in India not earlier than in February 2008.

Channel 4 reviewed the film as "A celebration of the classical singing tradition set in contemporary New Delhi, Rajan Khosa's film captures the beauty of ancient Indian music and the culture from which it emanates."

=== Awards ===
- 1997: London Film Festival: Audience Award
- 1997: Festival of Three Continents: Audience Award
- 1997: Festival of Three Continents: Best Actress: Kitu Gidwani
- 1998: Chicago International Film Festival: Gold Plaque, Best Music: Rajan Khosa
- 1998: International Film Festival Rotterdam: Netpac Award
- 1998: British Asian Film Festival: Best Director: Rajan Khosa
