= Ghamasaan =

Indian Hindi language film by Tigmanshu Dhulia

- Official release poster
- Directed by: Tigmanshu Dhulia
- Screenplay by: Tigmanshu Dhulia
- Story by: Piiyush Singh; Ram Yash Singh
- Based on: Dadua
- Produced by: Ashwini Chaudhary; Jyoti Deshpande; Saurabh Gupta; Abhayanand Singh; Piiyush Singh
- Starring: Arshad Warsi; Pratik Gandhi; Rajpal Yadav; Ishita Dutta
- Cinematography: Dev Agarwal
- Edited by: Sourabh Prabhudesai
- Music by: Anuj Garg
- Production companies: Jio Studios; Yaelstar Films; Golden Ratio Films
- Distributed by: ZEE5
- Release dates: 20 October 2024 (MAMI Mumbai Film Festival); 11 September 2026 (India)
- Running time: 150 minutes
- Country: India
- Language: Hindi

Ghamasaan is an Indian Hindi-language crime drama film written by Piiyush Singh and Ram Yash Singh and directed by Tigmanshu Dhulia. Based on dacoit Dadua, the film stars Pratik Gandhi, Arshad Warsi, Rajpal Yadav and Ishita Dutta in pivotal roles.

Ghamasaan was first premiered at MAMI Mumbai Film Festival, then at Cinevesture International Film Festival in Chandigarh, and then screened at 16th Chicago South Asian Film Festival.

The film was released on 11 September 2026 on ZEE5.

== Plot ==
Set in 2006, the story follows a cat and mouse chase against Maharaj (Arshad Warsi), a ruthless dacoit inspired by Bundelkhand bandit Dadua. Maharaj is powered by corrupt politicians and police. But Aditya Singh(Pratik Gandhi), an honest IPS officer, determined to hunt down Maharaj.

== Cast ==
- Arshad Warsi as Maharaj
- Pratik Gandhi as Aditya Singh (IPS)
- Ishita Dutta as Aparna Singh, Aditya’s wife
- Roshan Joy Koottyani as Raghu Menon (IPS)
- Himangshu Dhulia as Chief minister Kripal Singh Yadav
- Seema Azmi as Kumari Sarojini
- Rajpal Yadav as Kalika
- Murari Kumar as Chota Patel
- Ananya Pathak as Badri
- Hemant Sharma as Lakhua
- Deepraj Rana as Harsh Verma
- Kumar Kanchan Ghosh as Manavendra
- Puneet Singh as Sahdev Singh
- Jatin Goswami as Angad
- Karan Pandey as Narendra
- Anurag Thakur as Balram Yadav
- Akanksha Verma as Balram's wife
- Pankaj Saraswat as S K Dubey
- Mrityunjay Pandey as Rizwan
- Paritosh Sand as Madhura Prasad

== Production ==
=== Development ===
The film was officially announced on 29 September 2022 with Pratik Gandhi and Arshad Warsi in lead roles. Initially the film was titled as 'Yash'. Warsi had to learn Bundeli language for the film.

=== Casting ===
After completion of the script director Dhulia approached Shahrukh Khan for the role of the Maharaj, but Khan rejected the role saying "I don’t do realistic films."

=== Filming ===
Most of the filming were shot in Dholpur, Bundelkhand and Chitrakoot, Madhya Pradesh. Gandhi and Warsi never shot together.

=== Marketing ===
A trailer of the film was unveiled in late August 2026.

=== Post production ===
Warsi and Gandhi revealed that there could be a sequel to the film.

== Music ==
Anuj Garg composed the music for the film. The musical rights are acquired by Zee Music Company.

Track listing
No.	Title	Music	Singer(s)	Length
1.	"Parajay"	Anuj Garg	Anuj Garg, Dinesh Pant, Vishal Chaturvedi	3:57
2.	"Dhain Dhain"	Anuj Garg	Anuj Garg, Sahil Aditya Ratan, Vishal Chaturvedi	3:54
3.	"Bhor"	Anuj Garg	Anuj Garg, Dinesh Pant, Yajat Garg	4.10
4.	"Aalaah"	Anuj Garg	Hemendra Sharma	1.56
Total length:				13:57

== Release ==
The film was first premiered at MAMI Mumbai Film Festival on 20 October 2024. The film was screened at Cinevesture International Film Festival in Chandigarh on 21 and 22 March, 2025. It also screened at 16th Chicago South Asian Film Festival.

The film was released on 11 September 2026 on Zee5.

== Critical reception ==
On the review aggregator website Rotten Tomatoes, 46% of 13 critics' reviews are positive, with an average rating of 5/10.

Shreyas Pande of The Hindu opined "Without a strong thematic core guiding the characters' actions, the old-school aesthetics cannot salvage much." Shubhra Gupta for The Indian Express stated that "Dhulia's dexterity in intertwining the politics of the land and the brutality of the landscape is something that kept me watching through the narrative, which sometimes becomes a bit uneven." Rishabh Suri of Hindustan Times praised the cast performance and wrote that the film "benefits from Tigmanshu's familiarity with the world it inhabits, even if it doesn't always find anything particularly new to say about it." Madhumanti Pait Chowdhury for NDTV reviewd the film and wrote "But the script lacks the punch and compactness that can actually uplift the film to the next level." Deepa Gahlot for Rediff.com rated the film 3/5 stars and opined "So many films about gangsters portray them in a heroic light, and make the cops look like villains, but Dhulia does not fall into that trap".

Devesh Sharma of Filmfare wrote "The restraint is credible, but it isn't always exciting." Aishani Biswas of Outlook stated "The film makes no attempt to make violence look particularly heroic." Pranati A S for Deccan Herald felt that the "By reducing a morally grey figure into a black-and-white villain, the film strips away the systemic failures that create dacoits in the first place." Kashvi Raj Singh for News18 stated "The film even builds to a promising confrontation, but just as the conflict gets dangerously delicious, the film climaxes too soon." Rahul Desai for The Hollywood reporter India opined "The story is often too busy to pause, because it knows so much, gets so comfortable, and strives to go places where others cannot."
