= Rangbaaz: The Bihar Chapter =

Indian Hindi-language crime drama film

- Directed by: Sachin Pathak
- Written by: Siddharth Mishra
- Produced by: Ajay Rai
- Starring: Vineet Kumar Singh; Aakanksha Singh; Vijay Maurya; Rajesh Tailang; Prashant Narayanan
- Music by: Sneha Khanwalkar
- Production company: JAR Pictures
- Distributed by: ZEE5
- Release date: 31 October 2025
- Running time: 146 minutes
- Country: India
- Language: Hindi

Rangbaaz: The Bihar Chapter is a 2025 Indian Hindi-language crime drama film directed by Sachin Pathak and written by Siddharth Mishra. The film stars Vineet Kumar Singh, Aakanksha Singh, Vijay Maurya, Rajesh Tailang, and Prashant Narayanan. It was released on the streaming platform ZEE5 on 31 October 2025.

== Plot ==
The film follows Haroon Ali Shah Baig, a gangster-turned-politician in Bihar. The narrative depicts his progression from small-time criminal activities to accumulating wealth and influence, eventually transitioning into politics. The story explores the intersection of crime, power, and political ambition in Bihar's volatile landscape.

The character and storyline are inspired by real-life figures from Bihar's criminal-political history, particularly former Siwan MP Mohammad Shahabuddin.

== Cast ==
- Vineet Kumar Singh as Haroon Ali Shah Baig (also known as Saheb)
- Aakanksha Singh as Sana Ali Baig
- Prashant Narayanan as a police officer
- Vijay Maurya
- Rajesh Tailang
- Geetanjali Kulkarni
- Soham Majumdar
- Saharsh Shukla

== Production ==
=== Development ===
The film was produced by Ajay Rai under JAR Pictures for ZEE5. Writer Siddharth Mishra, who had previously written all three seasons of the Rangbaaz web series, returned to pen the screenplay. Director Sachin Pathak had previously directed the third season of the web series, Rangbaaz: Darr Ki Rajneeti (2022), which also focused on Bihar's political underworld.

The film marks a departure from the anthology web series format to a feature-length presentation, representing the franchise's first cinematic adaptation.

=== Filming ===
Production emphasized location authenticity and depicting Bihar's political context. The film was shot with the intention of portraying the regional dynamics and power structures of the state.

=== Music ===
The musical score was composed by Sneha Khanwalkar, who had previously worked on earlier seasons of the Rangbaaz series.

== Historical context ==
The film's narrative draws inspiration from Mohammad Shahabuddin (1967–2021), a controversial figure in Bihar politics. Shahabuddin served as Member of Parliament from Siwan constituency for four consecutive terms between 1996 and 2004, and as Member of the Bihar Legislative Assembly from 1990 to 1995. He was associated with the Rashtriya Janata Dal and was known as a "bahubali" (strongman) in Siwan district.

Shahabuddin faced numerous criminal charges throughout his political career and was convicted in multiple cases, including kidnapping and murder. He died in Delhi in May 2021 from COVID-19 complications while serving a life sentence.

== Release ==
Rangbaaz: The Bihar Chapter premiered exclusively on ZEE5 on 31 October 2025. The film was made available in Hindi, Tamil, and Telugu audio tracks with subtitle options. The runtime is approximately 146 minutes.

The release coincided with election cycles in Bihar, leading to discussions about the film's timing and subject matter.

== Reception ==
Initial coverage following the release focused on the performances and the film's treatment of its politically sensitive subject matter. Vineet Kumar Singh's portrayal of the lead character received attention in early reviews. As of November 2025, the film held a rating of 6.4/10 on IMDb.

Entertainment publications noted the film's approach to depicting the nexus between crime and politics in Bihar, with some observers recommending viewers consult journalistic sources for historical context on the real-life figures that inspired the narrative.

== Franchise connection ==
The film is part of the Rangbaaz franchise, which began as a ZEE5 original web series in 2018. Previous installments include:

- Rangbaaz (2018) – Based on the life of Uttar Pradesh gangster Shri Prakash Shukla
- Rangbaaz Phirse (2019) – Inspired by Rajasthan gangster Anandpal Singh
- Rangbaaz: Darr Ki Rajneeti (2022) – A six-episode series also based on Mohammad Shahabuddin.

While maintaining thematic continuity with the franchise, The Bihar Chapter functions as a standalone narrative with a different cast and expanded runtime.

== See also ==
- Rangbaaz (TV series)
- Mohammad Shahabuddin (Indian politician)
- Crime in India
- List of Indian films of 2025
- List of Hindi films of 2025
