= Invasion 1897 =

- Theatrical release poster
- Directed by: Lancelot Oduwa Imasuen
- Written by: Lancelot Oduwa Imasuen
- Produced by: Lancelot Oduwa Imasuen
- Starring: Mike Omoregbee; Charles Venn; Tim Robinson; Gareth Mort
- Cinematography: Dev Agarwal
- Edited by: Amen Imasuen
- Production company: Ice Slide Films
- Distributed by: Ice Slide Films
- Release date: 21 December 2014
- Running time: 113 minutes
- Country: Nigeria
- Languages: English; Edo

Invasion 1897 is a 2014 Nigerian epic historical film produced and directed by Lancelot Oduwa Imaseun. It stars Segun Arinze, Paul Obazele and Charles Inojie. Released in 2014, the film re-enacts the historical events that culminated in the February 1897 invasion, destruction and looting of the ancient Kingdom of Benin; and the deposition and exile of its once powerful king.

At the Best of Nollywood Awards, Invasion 1897 was nominated for Best Cinematography, Best Actor, Best Special Effects, and Best Editing, and won awards for Best Film, Best Sound Design and Best Director.

== Plot ==
The story follows a young prince of Benin who is arrested and put on trial for stealing historical artefacts from a British museum. The artefacts were looted from his kingdom during the 1897 invasion, and as he defends himself, his narrative unfolds into a journey through history, re-enacting the events that led to the British attack on the ancient Kingdom of Benin.

== Cast ==
- Mike Omoregbee as Oba Ovonramwen
- Charles Venn as Igie
- Murtaza Arif as journalist
- Sandra Idubor as Oba's wife
- Ehigiator Joy Nosa as Queen Ehi
- James Pimenta as journalist
- Paul Obazele
- Rudolph Walker
- Segun Arinze
- Annika Álofti as Chloe
- Idiata Otiagbe
- Nosa Ehimwem
- Charles Inojie
- Hannah Felstead
- Justus Esiri
