= Masoom Sawaal =

- Directed by: Santosh Upadhyay
- Written by: Kamlesh K Mishra
- Produced by: Ranjana Upadhyay
- Starring: Nitanshi Goel; Ekavali Khanna; Shishir Sharma
- Cinematography: Dev Agarwal
- Edited by: Radhey Lalsa
- Music by: Bapi Bhattacharya
- Production company: Nakshatra 27 Productions
- Distributed by: Nakshtra Productions
- Release date: 5 August 2022
- Running time: 145 minutes
- Country: India
- Language: Hindi

Masoom Sawaal is a 2022 Indian Hindi-language film directed by Santosh Upadhyay. It stars Nitanshi Goel, Ekavali Khanna, Shishir Sharma, Madhu Sachdeva and Rohit Tiwari. The film is produced by Ranjana Upadhyay under her production banner Nakshatra 27 Productions. The film was released on 5 August 2022.

== Cast ==
- Nitanshi Goel as Niyati
- Ekavali Khanna as Lawyer
- Shishir Sharma as Judge
- Madhu Sachdeva as Dadi
- Rohit Tiwari as Santosh
- Brinda Trivedi as Niyati's mother

== Plot ==
The story of the film revolves around the superstitions and regulations imposed on women during their menstrual cycle.
