= Zoya Hussain =

Indian actress, writer and director

- Born: 1990 or 1991 (age 35–36); Delhi, India
- Occupations: Actress; model
- Years active: 2017 – present

Zoya Hussain is an Indian actress, model, writer and director who predominantly appears in Hindi films. She got recognition for her role in Mukkabaaz, directed by Anurag Kashyap.

== Career ==
Zoya Hussain was born and brought up in Delhi. She started her career as an actress with the film Mukkabaaz. She first met Anurag Kashyap for the script she had written and wanted Anurag to give his feedback on the same. But Anurag didn't find the script and approached Zoya for playing a role in his next Mukkabaaz. Regarding her role in the film, Raja Sen of NDTV stated that "Zoya Hussain is great in an excessively demanding part, mute but loud as can be, the feistiest heroine we've had in a while".

== Filmography ==
Key
| † | Denotes films that have not yet been released |

| Year | Film | Role | Language | Notes |
|---|---|---|---|---|
| 2017 | Mukkabaaz | Sunaina Mishra | Hindi | Won—Best Actress at Ashu chavdaJagran Film Festival; Nominated—Zee Cine Award for Best Female Debut |
| 2018 | Teen Aur Aadha | Sulekha | Hindi | |
| 2018 | Namdev Bhau: In Search of Silence | Tara | Hindi | |
| 2019 | Laal Kaptaan | The Widow | Hindi | |
| 2021 | Kaadan | Aruvi | Tamil | Trilingual film |
| 2021 | Aranya / Haathi Mere Saathi | Arvi | Telugu; Hindi | Trilingual film |
| 2021 | Ankahi Kahaniya | Tanu Mathur | Hindi | Anthology |
| 2024 | Bhaiyya Ji | Mithali | Hindi | |
| 2025 | Ground Zero | Aadila | Hindi | |

=== Web series ===
| Year | Series | Role(s) | Network | Ref(s) |
|---|---|---|---|---|
| 2021 | Grahan | SP Amrita Singh | Disney+ Hotstar | |
| 2024 | Big Girls Don't Cry | Aliya Lamba | Prime Video | |
| 2026 | Hunkkaar | Shivani | Disney + Hotstar | |

=== Music videos ===
| Year | Title | Artist | References |
|---|---|---|---|
| 2018 | "Cold/Mess" | Prateek Kuhad | |
| 2021 | "Break Free" | When Chai Met Toast" | |
