= Rajan Khosa =

Indian writer-director-producer

Rajan Khosa is an Indian writer-director-producer who has worked between the UK, Europe and India for much of his career.

He is best known for his directorial venture Gattu, which won at the Berlin Film Festival. It won a Screen Award in India and 20 other international awards. Rajan came into the limelight with his debut feature film Dance of the Wind (1997), which was a co-production between six countries, the very first of its kind in India, and was sold worldwide. It premiered at Venice and won awards at Rotterdam, Chicago, London, and Nantes, to name a few. In 2015–17, Rajan was creative director on the animation project Selfie With Bajrangi a 104-episode series now on JioHotstar

In 2014–16, he developed a large scale feature film with Disney-UTV. Rajan has been a recipient of the Huber Bals Award in Rotterdam & Montecinemaverite Award in Locarno. His half-hour Indian diploma Bodh-Vriksha (Wisdom Tree), which released in 1987, garnered him a National Award and three Oberhausen Awards. Along with being a voting member of BAFTA Awards, he's also an alumnus of the Royal College of Arts London, FTII Pune, and NID Ahmedabad. Rajan is founder of Elephant Eye Productions that not only makes feature films but also produces spatial experiences with story, multiple projections and holography.

== Biography ==
Rajan Khosa started his professional education at Film and Television Institute of India (FTII), Pune, and Royal College of Art (RCA) London and also spend a few years at National Institute of Design, Ahmedabad.He is credited as a Film and Television Institute of India (FTII) student participant in Holi (1984).

== Filmography ==
- Gattu (2012)
- Dance of the Wind (1997)
- Bodh-Vriksha (Wisdom Tree) (1987)
- Selfie With Bajrangi (series) (2015—present)

== Awards ==
- 1985: National Film Award for Best Short Fiction Film: Wisdom Tree
- 1997: London Film Festival: Audience Award: Dance of the Wind.
- 1997: Festival of Three Continents: Audience Award: Dance of the Wind.
- 1998: Chicago International Film Festival: Gold Plaque, Best Music: Dance of the Wind (1997)
- 1998: International Film Festival Rotterdam: Netpac Award: Dance of the Wind (1997)
- 2012: 62nd Berlin International Film Festival- Special Mention – Best Film: Grand Prix of the Deutsches Kinderhilfswerk: Gattu
- 2012: Asia Pacific Screen Awards: Nomination for Best Children's film: Gattu
- 2012: Colors Screen Award: Best Child Artist: Gattu
- 2012: Los Angeles International Film Festival: Audience Award for Best Feature: Gattu
- 2012: Tel Aviv International Children's Film Festival – Israel: Citation of Excellence Award: Gattu
- 2012: Castellinaria Film Festival – Switzerland: Bronze Castle Award: Gattu
- 2012: Castellinaria Film Festival – Switzerland: Pemio ASPI Award: Gattu
- 2012: Seoul International Youth Film Festival – South Korea: Audience Award: Gattu
- 2012: New York Indian Film Festival: Best Feature Film: Gattu
- 2012: New York Indian Film Festival: Best Young Actor: Gattu
- 2013: 42nd Roshd Int.Film Festival – Tehran-Iran: Diploma of Honor: Gattu
- 2013: China International Children's Film Festival: Best Performance by a Child Actor: Gattu
