= Mukkabaaz =

2017 film

- Theatrical release poster
- Directed by: Anurag Kashyap
- Written by: Anurag Kashyap; Vineet Kumar Singh; Mukti Singh Srinet; K.D.Satyam; Ranjan Chandel; Prasoon Mishra
- Story by: Anudeep Singh
- Produced by: Aanand L. Rai; Vikramaditya Motwane; Madhu Mantena; Anurag Kashyap
- Starring: Vineet Kumar Singh; Zoya Hussain; Jimmy Sheirgill; Ravi Kishan
- Cinematography: Rajeev Ravi; Shanker Raman; Jay I. Patel; Jayesh Nair
- Edited by: Aarti Bajaj; Ankit Bidyadhar
- Music by: Score: Prashant Pillai; Songs: Nucleya; Rachita Arora; Vineet Kumar Singh
- Production companies: Phantom Films; Colour Yellow Productions
- Distributed by: Eros International
- Release dates: 9 September 2017 (TIFF); 12 January 2018 (India)
- Running time: 155 minutes
- Country: India
- Language: Hindi
- Box office: ₹10.51 crore

Mukkabaaz (Hindi pronunciation: [mʊkkaːbaːz]), released internationally as The Brawler, is a 2017 Indian Hindi-language sports drama film co-written, co-produced and directed by Anurag Kashyap. Jointly produced by Aanand L. Rai's Colour Yellow Productions and Phantom Films, the film stars Vineet Kumar Singh, debutant Zoya Hussain, Ravi Kishan and Jimmy Shergill in the lead roles. It follows Shravan Kumar (Singh), an aspiring boxer, who falls in love with the niece of the boxing federation head, Bhagwan Das Mishra (Shergill).

Mukkabaaz was conceived by Singh, who wrote it with his sister Mukti Singh, based on his observations of several sportspersons' experiences in India. Several producers rejected it until Kashyap agreed to make the film on the condition that Singh would train to become a real boxer. To prepare, Singh went to the Netaji Subhas National Institute of Sports, where he trained in boxing for a year. Aarti Bajaj and Ankit Bidyadhar edited the film, while Shanker Raman, Rajeev Ravi, Jay I. Patel and Jayesh Nair served as the directors of photography. The score is composed by Prashant Pillai and the songs are composed by Singh, Nucleya and Rachita Arora.

Mukkabaaz premiered in the Special Presentations section at the 2017 Toronto International Film Festival and was also screened at the 2017 Mumbai Film Festival. It was released theatrically in India on 12 January 2018 and received positive reviews, with particular praise for Singh's performance. The film grossed ₹10.51 crore (US$1.1 million) at the box office. At the 64th Filmfare Awards, it received three nominations including Best Actor (Critics) for Vineet and Best Story for Anudeep Singh. Vikram Dahiya and Sunil Rodrigues won the award for Best Action.

== Plot ==
Shravan Singh is a struggling boxer who works for a local politician and head of the State Boxing Federation, Bhagwan Das Mishra. He drifts away after Bhagwan Das has him perform only domestic tasks and errands rather than training him in boxing. Shravan falls in love with Bhagwan Das's niece, Sunaina, who is a mute. Her father tells him to get a job before considering marrying her. For the job, Shravan tries to enter the state-level tournament but is not selected because of Bhagwan Das. He then leaves for Varanasi and is trained by a local trainer, Sanjay Kumar.

Shravan defeats Bhagwan Das's boxer and wins a medal, after which he gets a job with the Indian Railways. Shravan and Sunaina are married as her father promised. However, Bhagwan Das despises the marriage and threatens his brother. Singh tries to balance his job, training, family life and learning sign language at Sunaina's request. Meanwhile, his boss at the office tries to harass him by putting too much work pressure on him. Bhagwan Das gets Sunaina's father fired from his job and expels her family from their home. They go to their ancestral village to live but are held captive by Bhagwan Das's goons in his village house. Bhagwan Das also breaks his brother's leg.

Later, at Sanjay Kumar's house, both Sanjay and Shravan are attacked by a mob after being falsely accused of eating beef. Sanjay gets seriously injured in the attack and is admitted to an ICU; Shravan survives the attack. He then tries to find Sunaina but fails; meanwhile, she is forcefully engaged to a businessman with a disability, by Bhagwan Das for money. Shravan fights and qualifies for the final of a national tournament. Sunaina and her mother manage to call Shravan and tell him of their whereabouts. Shravan goes there and rescues Sunaina and her family. Bhagwan Das manages to disqualify Shravan on health grounds but reinstates him after Shravan apologizes; Bhagwan Das also requires that Shravan lose the match and retire from boxing. Thus, Shravan loses the final match.

== Cast ==
- Vineet Kumar Singh as Shravan Kumar Singh
- Zoya Hussain as Sunaina Mishra
- Jimmy Sheirgill as Bhagwan Das Mishra
- Sadhana Singh as Meera Mishra, Sunaina's mother
- Ravi Kishan as Sanjay Kumar
- Shakti Kumar as Bhatia
- Rajesh Tailang as Shravan's father
- Shreshtha Gupta as Shravan's mother
- Shree Dhar Dubey as Gopal Tiwari
- Chittaranjan Tripathy as Krishna Kant Yadav
- Sukhesh Mishra as Gopal Das
- Shikha Chauhan as Guddi Singh, Shravan's sister
- Abhay Joshi as Inspector
- Neeraj Goyat as a professional boxer
- Deepak Tanwar as a boxer
- Nawazuddin Siddiqui as the Baaraat singer

== Production ==
=== Development ===
Actor Vineet Kumar Singh said that he was not getting the kind of work he wanted in films, so he decided to write his own script on boxing, as he has an athletic background, having been a national-level basketball player who played at six National Games at the mini and sub-junior levels. The idea of the film came to Singh based on his observation of the experiences of athletes in the country. He said: "I’ve seen lots of stories like this, which stayed with me over the years. I wrote this film because I wanted to play this character and I knew the only way to do that is by writing it myself." Singh wrote the script with his sister, basketball player Mukti Singh Srinet, in 2013 and sought a financier for it. He looked at the "player's struggles — those who couldn't find their way up because they couldn't land in the officials' good books; the bad conditions they lived, played and practised in". He mentioned a single incident that triggered the script was seeing his senior, who had won several boxing medals and whose photographs had appeared in the newspaper, "stealthily porting luggage" at the Varanasi Junction railway station to make ends meet. When Singh saw him, he was trying to hide his face behind the luggage. Singh said the incident "really shook" him because he was also a sportsperson. He took inspiration from the story of some other players who worked as a sweeper or who sold their medals.

While he was pitching his script, Singh also worked on his stamina for the role by running, skipping and cardio training for two hours every day. Singh insisted that he had to be the lead actor of the film, but no producer would agree to this. Eventually, director Anurag Kashyap learned of the script. He had worked earlier with Singh on three films: Gangs of Wasseypur (2012), Bombay Talkies (2013) and Ugly (2014). Kashyap felt that the script was very similar to Rocky (1976) and asked Singh to show him a "Rocky" in India. However, Kashyap found one sequence in the script where the protagonist tries to get a government job interesting. He said he would make the film on two conditions: he would change the script a little, and Singh needed "to look like a boxer".

For Kashyap, it was boxing and the case of Narsingh Pancham Yadav, who was accused of doping, that prompted him to make the film. Singh said that he knew about the "politics, caste bias and power struggles in sports associations" but Kashyap developed the sociopolitical side of the script. To prepare for the role, Singh could find only mixed martial arts fighters in Mumbai, who were expensive. Kashyap connected him to boxer Vijender Singh, who put him in touch with coaches in Patiala. Singh sold all his belongings and left Mumbai the same night for training after Kashyap decided to make the film.

Kashyap, Singh, Mukti Singh, K.D.Satyam, Ranjan Chandel and Prasoon Mishra wrote the final script. Anand L. Rai called Kashyap and asked him to direct Manmarziyaan, but Kashyap said he wanted to make Mukkabaaz first. They both agreed to this and decided to co-produce the film. In July 2017, it was confirmed they would be working together on the film. The film is set in the Bareilly district of Uttar Pradesh and is inspired by several true incidents. Mukkabaaz also deals with the issue of the caste system and cow vigilantism in India. Singh trained for a year to play the part with coach Anudeep Singh, a former boxer, who was coaching people for free and runs a garage. His story was used when researching the film. He was also trained by Harpreet Singh, who was a coach of the Indian boxing team. Singh did not disclose to his coaches that he was preparing for a film role. His trainers said that Singh was learning boxing at the age when boxers usually retire. Singh's training began at the Netaji Subhas National Institute of Sports, Patiala, a year before filming. During training, he could not see punches coming and took a real beating every day, at one point breaking some ribs. Later, he learned how to counter and defend himself. He trained for more than 700 days and was injured several times.

=== Casting ===
Delhi theatre actress Zoya Hussain makes her feature debut in the film playing a mute girl. Kashyap had wanted to work with her after seeing her film Three and Half Takes, which he liked. To prepare for the role, Hussain spent several months learning non-verbal language and mannerisms from sign language expert Sangeeta Gala. Kashyap said that her disability symbolises the lack of voice women in her region have.

Ravi Kishan plays the role of Sanjay Kumar, a failed boxer who teaches Shravan Kumar boxing. He was selected by casting director Mukesh Chhabra. Rajesh Tailang plays the role of Shravan's father. Jimmy Shergill was cast as the antagonist, Bhagwan Das Mishra, an upper-caste don. Sadhana Singh was also part of the film. Real life boxers Neeraj Goyat and Deepak Tanwar also appear in the film.

=== Filming ===
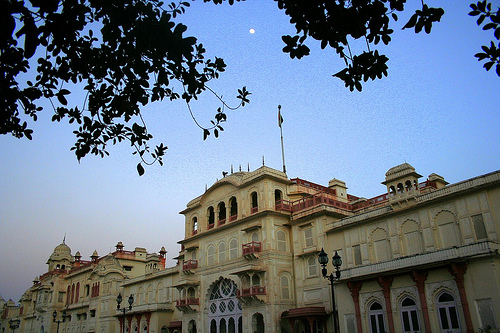
In preparation for his role, Singh trained as a boxer at the Netaji Subhas National Institute of Sports.

Kashyap sent his second unit director, Saqib Pandor, to record boxing tournaments, which were then recreated as the state tournaments for the film. They witnessed a boxing tournament happening under a tent without an audience as the boxing ring was being used for something else. Kashyap also realised that after attending an actual boxing tournament in north India that there was no audience apart from "people in power who decide which boxer should represent the state, and who will not". Kashyap told Singh not to do "filmi training" but to become a hardcore boxer. No boxing choreographers or action directors were used for the film. Kashyap also watched several Hollywood films about boxing. During filming, he fought with real international-level boxers with no choreography. He broke a rib and his hand. Kashyap said that in sports films the actors "expose themselves too much", whereas Singh "just disappeared" into the role. Mukkabaaz was shot in Bareilly, Varanasi and Lucknow in May 2017.

The film was singer-composer Rachita Arora's first film as a composer. She was recommended to Kashyap by Makrand Deshpande. She was doing a play with him and was standing outside in a parking lot. Kashyap heard a song composed by Arora and approached her, later signing her for the film. Aarti Bajaj and Ankit Bidyadhar edited the film, while Shanker Raman, Rajeev Ravi and Jayesh Nair served as the directors of photography.

== Soundtrack ==
The film's soundtrack featured ten tracks; eight songs and two alternates. Rachita Arora composed seven tracks for the album, with one song "Paintra" and its extended version, being composed by Nucleya and "Adhura Main" by Vineet Kumar Singh. Lyrics for the songs were written by Singh, Hussain Haidry and Sunil Jogi. The soundtrack was released on 23 December 2017 under the Eros Music label.

== Release ==
Mukkabaaz premiered at the 2017 Toronto International Film Festival and was also screened at the 2017 MAMI Film Festival, where it received a standing ovation. The film was originally scheduled for release on 10 November 2017, but the date moved to 12 January 2018. Mukkabaaz was released alongside Kaalakaandi and 1921 on about 1100 screens across India. A special screening was held for the cast and crew before the theatrical release. The film is also available in DVD format and in the online streaming platform, Zee5.

== Reception ==
=== Critical reception ===
On the review aggregator website Rotten Tomatoes, 88% of 16 critics' reviews are positive, with an average rating of 6/10.

Mukkabaaz received mostly positive reviews from critics with particular praise for Singh's performance. Rajeev Masand responded positively saying, "[..] populated by characters that are authentic and rooted firmly in the landscape, the film sees Kashyap on solid ground." He felt, however, the film was "overlong and occasionally rambling". Anirudh Bhattacharya of Outlook felt the film was a "little heftier" but said, "this isn't Raging Bull, it's just rocky." Raja Sen called it Kashyap's best film, made with "vintage filmi sensibility but highly modern skills". He also praised Singh for a "tremendous performance, not least because of his staggeringly authentic physicality". The Hindustan Times' Rohit Vats commended both Hussain's and Singh's performances. He noted that though Hussain is "at the lack of words" ... "her eyes are not", and praising Singh for giving a "performance we all will cherish for years". Vats also called it "the best film in last one year or so."(sic)

Renuka Vyavahare of The Times of India cited the film as a "total knockout" and wrote: "The not-just-a-boxing film must not be missed as it puts forth a message that's most relevant in today's world." The Hindu's Namrata Joshi wrote: "This is in no way a celebration of sports but a hard-nosed look at the rampant corruption, nepotism and casteist politics at the core of games, and life in general, especially their centrality in Uttar Pradesh." Saibal Chatterjee of NDTV praised Hussain and Zoya's performances and the treatment of cow vigilantism and wrote: "Watch it because it is one of the more important films to have come out of the Mumbai movie industry in recent times."

Anupama Chopra praised Singh's physical transformation as well as the "internal transformation", though she expressed her concern over the film's runtime that "just wears you down". Mayank Shekhar wrote: "Mukkabaaz marks Kashyap's fab return to a realm he understands and expresses best -- with all its flaws, angst and humour, Tarantino-esque pop-culture references, making it all as distressing as it is frickin' fun and real." Rachit Gupta of Filmfare felt it was Kashyap's "most mature film to date" with "bits of Rocky, On the Waterfront and a whole lot of Romeo & Juliet". Uday Bhatia of Mint called it a "bracing start to the movie year" that is "overstuffed, enjoyable and urgent".

On the contrary, Sreehari Nair of Rediff.com felt the film tried to cover too many issues and called it a "minor Anurag Kashyap film" that "aims low and hits." Shubhra Gupta of The Indian Express said that the "punches land in exactly the right place" when caste discrimination is addressed in the film. She also felt that the "film falters when it slips into melodrama". Tanul Thakur of The Wire wrote: "Mukkabaaz fails to go beyond the surface of caste realities." Reuters' Shilpa Jamkhandikar said that the film "tries to land too many punches, and in doing so, misses the mark."

Among the overseas reviewers, Deborah Young of The Hollywood Reporter in a positive review wrote: "Energetic, cinematic, political and not just for sports fans." Screen International's David D'Archy mentioned in his review: "Kashyap manages to pack caste inequality, corruption and a triumph over disability into a romantic melodrama built around the boxing ring." Wendy Ide called the film an example of "gritty, grubby film-making" with "robustly filthy" dialogues, the violence "unflinching and the music loaded with innuendo". Mike McCahill of The Guardian called it "a heavy-hitting social critique disguised as a rock 'em–sock 'em sports movie."

=== Box office ===
Mukkabaaz earned ₹82 lakh (US$85,000) in its first day of release and ₹1.51 crore (US$160,000) on its second day. It collected a total of ₹4.04 crore (US$420,000) in its first weekend and ₹6.75 crore (US$700,000) in its first week. The film's opening was slow but the collections increased after positive word of mouth. Mukkabaaz earned a total of ₹10.51 crore (US$1.1 million) over its theatrical run.

== See also ==
- List of boxing films
