= Salim Diwan =

Indian film actor

- Born: 12 May 1985 (age 41); Rajasthan
- Occupations: Actor; Entrepreneur
- Years active: 2016–present
- Known for: Bollywood Diaries; Aliya Basu Gayab Hai

Salim Diwan (born 12 May 1985) is an Indian actor and entrepreneur. He made his debut in Bollywood Diaries.

== Early life ==
Salim Diwan was born in the Jhunjhunu district of Rajasthan, India. During his school years, he was actively involved with local theatre groups, which sparked his interest in acting. After completing his graduation, Diwan pursued a degree in law in Mumbai. However, before starting his acting career, he joined his father’s pharmaceutical company.

== Career ==
In 2005–06, Salim Diwan participated in the reality show Jet Set Go and received an IIFA award in Dubai. Following this, he enrolled at the Kishore Namit Kapoor Institute to pursue professional acting training.

Diwan made his Bollywood debut with a brief appearance in Ankur Arora Murder Case. He later gained attention for his role in Bollywood Diaries, which was released on 26 February 2016. In the film, he portrayed Rohit, a Bollywood enthusiast with dreams of making it in the film industry. The trailer for the movie was launched on 12 January 2016 in Mumbai, India.

Beyond his acting career, Diwan is the promoter and Managing Director of Rajasthan Aushdhalaya Pvt. Ltd. (Rajasthan Herbals International), a prominent Ayurvedic medicines manufacturer with over 60000 centres across India. He actively pursues his company’s vision of an “Addiction Free India", wherein his dedicated team has organised thousands of DE-addiction camps all over the country to curb addiction and help in rehabilitation of the addicts and subsequent recovery.

Salim Diwan is involved in lot of philanthropic activities and takes time out of his busy and hectic schedule to reach out to needy people for their betterment. He also engages in various social causes like reaching out to orphanages, old age homes and other such institutions for the poor. His philanthropy reflects from his actions like arranging free educations for girls from poor families, adopting orphans and ensuring daily square meals and education for them. All his birthdays are celebrated mostly in orphanages as he always likes to put a smile on the underprivileged, which reflects his caring nature.

== Filmography ==
=== Films ===
Year	Title	Role	References
2016	Bollywood Diaries	Rohit Gupta	
2020	Quran (Short Film)	Self	
2021	The Perfect Scream (Short Film)	Arjun	
2023	It's Too Late (Short Film)	Veer	
2024	Aliya Basu Gayab Hai	Deepak	
-	For Me for The World (Short Film)	Self	
-	Adiyal	Ishwar	

=== Music video ===
Year	Title	Role	References
2021	Tu Hi To Hai	Lead	
2022	Intezaar	Lead	
2023	Shehar Mein Bewafa	Lead	
2024	Tum Suno To Sahi	Lead	
2025	Rehmat Sa Aaya	Lead	
