= Bollywood Diaries =

2016 film directed by K.D. Satyam

- Theatrical release poster
- Directed by: K.D.Satyam
- Written by: K.D.Satyam
- Produced by: Dr. Sattar Diwan
- Starring: Raima Sen Salim Diwan, Ashish Vidyarthi
- Cinematography: Dev Agarwal
- Music by: Vipin Patwa
- Production company: Rehab Pictures Pvt Ltd
- Distributed by: Zee Studios
- Release date: 26 February 2016
- Running time: 125 minutes
- Country: India
- Language: Hindi

Bollywood Diaries is a 2016 Indian Hindi-language drama film written and directed by K.D.Satyam. It features Raima Sen, Salim Diwan, and Ashish Vidyarthi as the main characters, along with Karuna Pandey and Vineet Kumar Singh. Produced by Dr. Sattar Diwan, the film was released on 26 February 2016.

== Plot ==
The story revolves around three unrelated individuals – Rohit (Salim Diwan), a man working at a call-center in Delhi, Vishnu (Ashish Vidyarthi), a retired middle-aged government servant from Bhilai, and Imli (Raima Sen), a prostitute from Sonagachi, Kolkata. All three aspire to become Bollywood actors, and each of them undergoes several hardships in their struggle to get a breakthrough in the industry. The movie shows the passion and madness of common individuals trying to realize their dreams in Bollywood.

== Cast ==
- Raima Sen as Imli
- Salim Diwan as Rohit
- Ashish Vidyarthi as Vishnu
- Karuna Pandey as Lata
- Vineet Kumar Singh as Daman
- Robin Das as Sundar Das
- Ekavali Khanna as Raveena

== Production ==
Principal photography of the film commenced in October, 2014 and the shoot began after a month, in November 2014. The film was shot in Bhilai, Kolkata and Delhi. During the filming, Ashish Vidyarthi suffered a mishap where he nearly drowned in the Shivnath river before being rescued by a policeman.

== Release ==
The film was released on 26 February 2016 across India.

== Reception ==
=== Critical response ===
Subhash K. Jha said, "(viewers) should not miss this aspirational Bollywood saga." Rahul Desai called it, "a well-acted, unnerving film about Bollywood aspirations." Rohit Bhatnagar from The Deccan Chronicle said Bollywood Diaries is a "brilliant tribute to Bollywood Struggling actors." Martin D’Souza of Glamsham.com rated the film with three stars, describing it as "an honest film with great connect." The Free Press Journal's Johnson Thomas called it, "a bittersweet story that has passion and substance and is smartly devoid of formulaic expressionism." Bollyvision.com called it, "an honest film." Box Office India said it was, "worth a look."

"The cinematography by Dev Agarwal was brilliant as he creates stark images, capturing the energy of the characters with an unforced realism," said Joginder Tuteja. Subhash K. Jha called The Bollywood Diaries "An ordinary film that touches the heart - 3 stars," by Divay Agarwal. Komal Nahta said, "Bollywood Diaries is a very real portrayal of strugglers in Bollywood. It is a genuinely good attempt which should be seen by those who with of cinema and Bollywood."
