= Brijesh Shandilya =

Indian playback singer

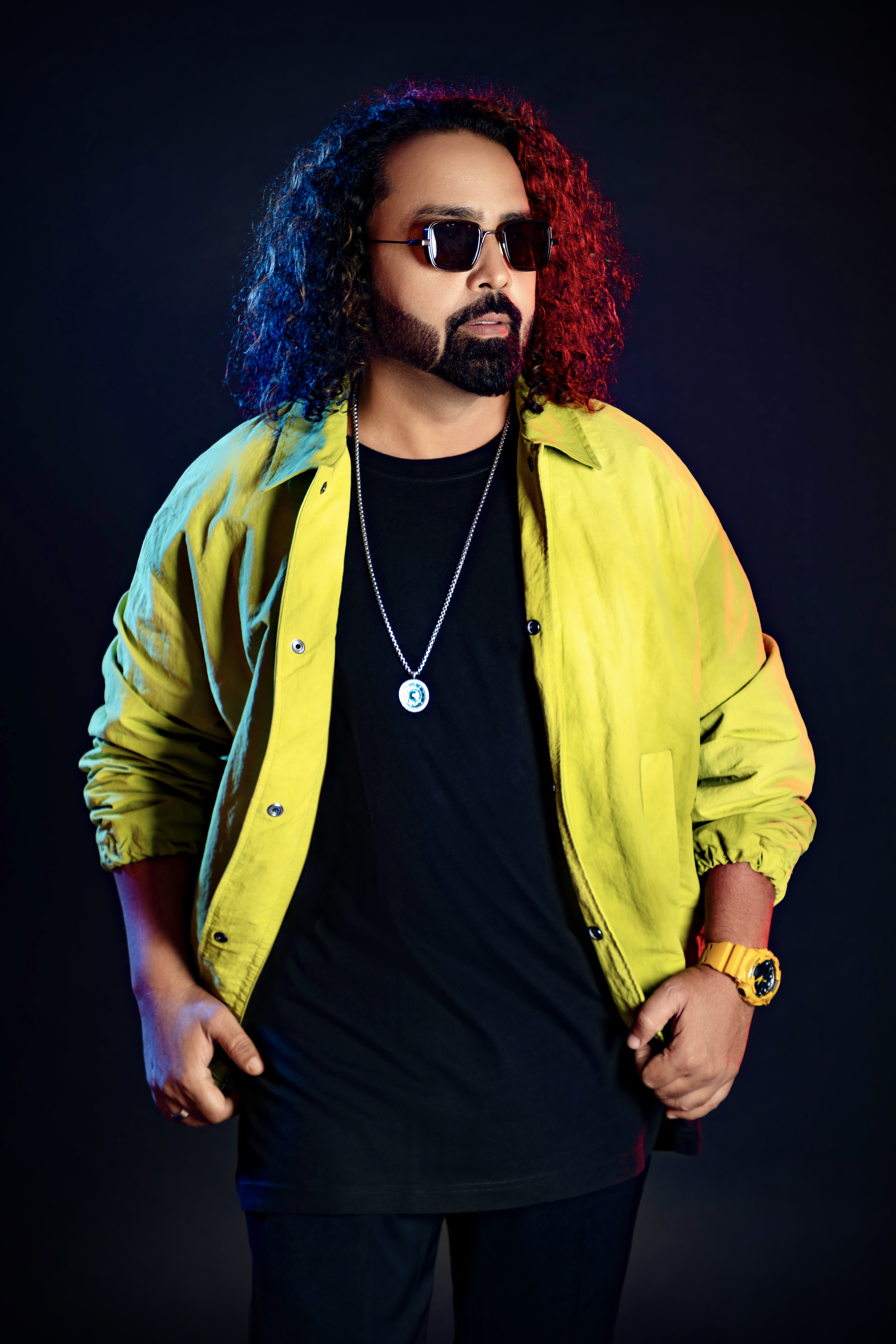

Background information
- Born: 13 December; Basti, Uttar Pradesh, India
- Genres: Indian Classical, Indian Bollywood, R&B, Dance-pop
- Occupations: Singer, record producer
- Years active: 2008–present
- Labels: T-Series; Eros Music; Saregama; Zee Music Company

Brijesh Shandilya, is an Indian playback singer and composer. Trained in Indian Classical music, he has sung songs in several Indian languages, including Hindi, Tamil, Telugu, Malayalam, Kannada, Bhojpuri, and Gujarati, since his debut in 2008.

== Early life ==
Brijesh Kumar Tripathi, known by his stage name Brijesh Shandilya was born in Basti District of Uttar Pradesh. He started learning classical music vocal from Prayag Sangeet Samiti in 2000 and completed in 2005. Later in 2006 he came to Mumbai.

== Career ==
Brijesh initial training was in Indian Classical music. He learnt vocals primarily but also plays the tabla, guitar, and harmonium. His music covers genres such as new-age Indian classical music, Bollywood music.

His latest Bollywood song is the title track from the movie Golmaal Again (2017). Another hot song is "Banno" from the movie Tanu Weds Manu: Returns (2015). In 2016, he sang "Sarrainodu" the title song for the film Sarrainodu. In 2008, he sang "Hooriyaan" for the film Oye Lucky! Lucky Oye!. In 2013 he also sang "Fauji" from the movie War Chhod Na Yaar. In 2015, he sang "Mera Nachan Nu", for the film Airlift.

== Discography ==
Year	Film	Song name	Composer	Notes
2008	Oye Lucky! Lucky Oye!	Hooriyan	Sneha Khanwalkar	Hindi Film
2011	Hostel	Heer Doli Le Chal	Virag Mishra	Hindi Film
2011	Sahi Dhandhe Galat Bande	Mast Kalander	Dhruv Dhalla	Hindi Film
2013	What the Fish	Saddi Hobby Jhappiyan	Dhruv Dhalla	Hindi Film
2013	War Chhod Na Yaar	Fauji	Aslam Keyi	Hindi Film
2014	Jai Ho	Jai Ho (Title Track)	Amaal Mallik	Hindi Film
2015	Tanu Weds Manu: Returns	Banno	Tanishk-Vayu	Winner 2016 GiMA Award for Best Duo/Group Song
2016	Airlift	Mera Nachan Nu	Amaal Mallik	Hindi Film
2016	Sarrainodu	Sarrainodu (Title Track)	S. Thaman	Telugu Film
2016	Pranaam	Rann Ki Dahaad	Jaan Nissar Lone	Hindi Film
2017	Zariya	Zariya	Vikram Montrose	Single Released by Zee Music Company
2017	Munna Michael	Swag	Pranaay	Hindi Film
2017	Shubh Mangal Savdhan	Rocket Saiyyan	Tanishk-Vayu	Hindi Film
2017	Lucknow Central	Baaki Rab Pe Chhod De	Tanishk Bagchi	Hindi Film
2017	Bhoomi	Trippy Trippy	Sachin–Jigar	Hindi Film
2017	Spyder	Aali Aali / Haali Haali	Harris Jayaraj	Tamil / Telugu
2017	Golmaal Again	Golmaal (Title Track)	S. Thaman	Hindi Film
2017	Brij Mohan Amar Rahe	Balma Yeh Karma	Tanishk-Vayu	Hindi Film
2018	Mukkabaaz	Mushkil Hai Apna Meil Priye	Rachita Arora	Hindi Film
2018	Hotel Milan	Hotel Milan Title Track	Amjad-Nadeem	Hindi Film
2018	Badhaai Ho	Badhaiyan Tenu	Tanishk Bagchi	Hindi Film
2019	Chappad Phaad Ke	Seedhe Raaste	Prashant Pillai	Hindi Film
2019	Pranaam	Rann Ki Dahaad	Jaan Nissar Lone	Hindi Film
2021	Chandigarh Kare Aashiqui	Kheench Te Nach	Sachin-Jigar	Hindi Film
2022	KGF: Chapter 2 (dubbed)	Sulthan	Ravi Basrur	Hindi Film

== Awards and achievements ==
Brijesh Shandilya has received awards and honors, including GiMA Awards, Mirchi Music Awards in the year 2016 and 2020. Brijesh Shandilya performed At The Royal Stag Mirchi Music Awards with Swati Sharma.

== See also ==
- List of Indian playback singers
