= Samira Koppikar =

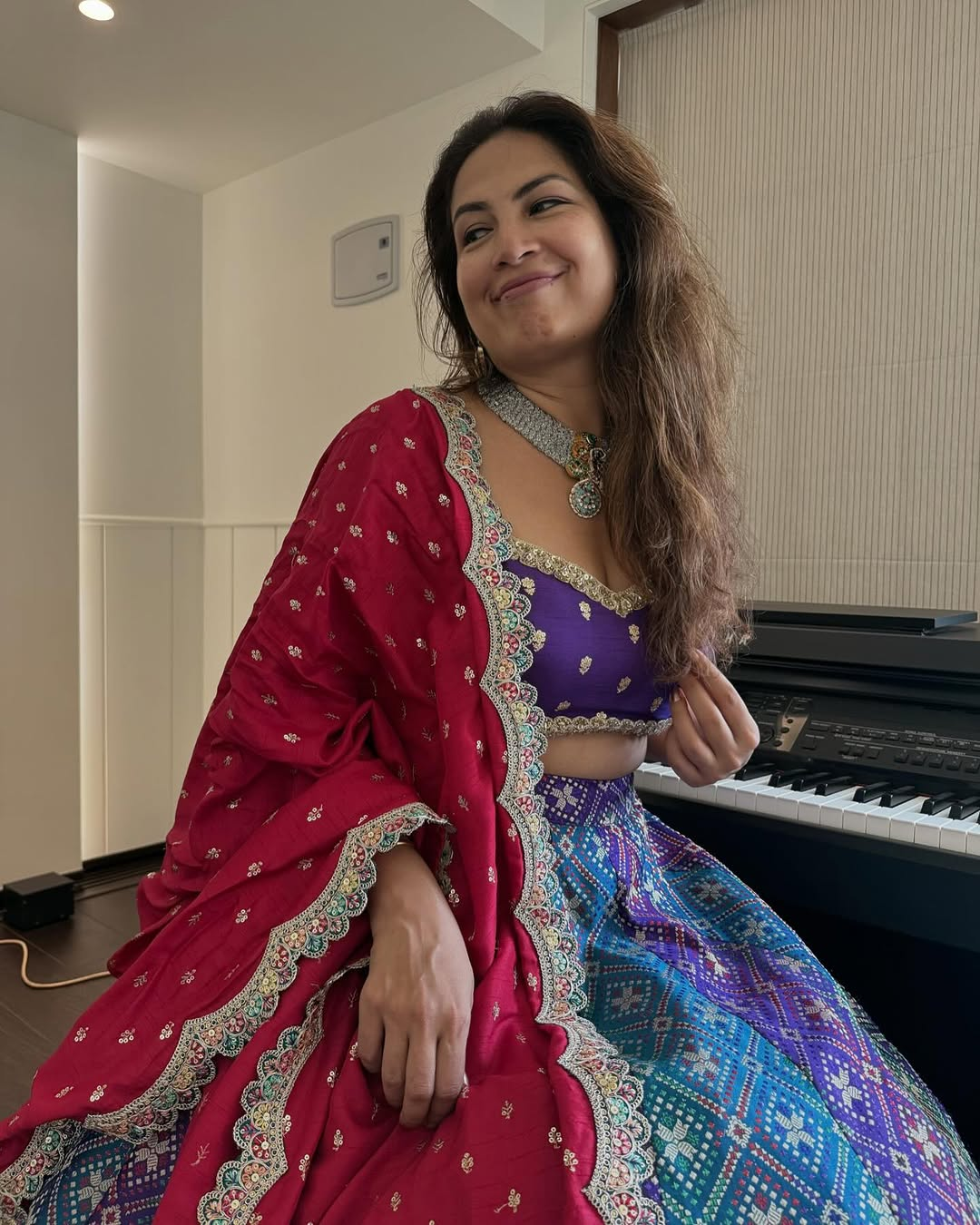

Background information
- Born: Samira Koppikar; Mumbai, India
- Genres: Acoustic folk, indie rock, fusion, jazz, indie pop, folktronica, alternative folk rock, ghazals, Indian film music
- Occupations: Singer, songwriter, composer, lyricist, music director
- Years active: 2014–present

Samira Koppikar is an Indian music director, composer, singer and songwriter. In 2015, she made her debut as a Bollywood composer with the song "Maati Ka Palang" for the film NH10. As a Bollywood playback singer, she was distinguished by the song "Aaj Phir Tum Pe" featured in Hate Story 2 (2014), which reached seventh in the top 10 Bollywood songs of 2014. She has performed at the Montreal International Jazz Festival.

== Early life ==
Koppikar was born into a Konkani Chitrapur Saraswat family from Bandra, Mumbai, and studied interior design. She has trained in Hindustani classical music.

== Career ==
Koppikar began her career by recording advertising jingles. While she was in the process of forming a band, she was spotted by Indian jazz gurus Louis Banks and Joe Alvarez at a jamming session; they later became her mentors.

Koppikar has appeared at corporate shows and music festivals across India and abroad including the Montreal International Jazz Festival in 2010, the Lavasa Music and Art Festival, and at Taj Vivanta in Mumbai and Pune. Arko Mukherjee heard Koppikar while she was performing one of her compositions and offered her "Aaj Phir Tumpe Pyar Aaya Hai", her first playback song as a singer for the Bollywood film Hate Story 2 from 2014. As of 2025, its music video received 213 million views on YouTube. This was followed by "Mohabbat Barsa De" for the film Creature 3D.

Koppikar released her debut single "Bebasi"—a song and music video—as a singer-songwriter in the indie space. Another composition and song "Maati Ka Palang" by Koppikar was featured as part of the film score and album for the 2015 Bollywood movie NH10. The film was produced by Phantom Films, Eros International and Clean Slate Films and directed by Navdeep Singh. The film features Anushka Sharma and Neil Bhoopalam in lead roles. Samira then released her next Bollywood composition "Bairaagi" from Bareilly Ki Barfi, which was also nominated for the Filmfare Awards and Mirchi Music Awards.

Koppikar has released songs independently, such as "Bebasi", with musicians Kalyan Baruah, Gino Banks, and Sheldon D'silva, as well as "Kaanch Ke" (featuring Lipstick Under My Burkha's Aahna Kumra). Koppikar composed soundtracks for NH10 (2015), Bareilly Ki Barfi (2017), Laal Kaptaan (2019), and Dobaara (2022). Apart from Bollywood music, Koppikar released two independent albums with Zee Music in 2023, both consisting of eight songs.

She has also ventured as an independent music artist by releasing six songs, two singles "Prem Scam" and "Mohabbat ki Wajah", and one EP "Sang Baarishon Ke".

== Filmography ==
=== As a Bollywood music director and playback singer ===
Year	Film	Song	Co-singer	Composer	Lyrics
2013	Jackpot	"Kabhi Jo Badal Barse" (Unplugged)	Arijit Singh	Shaarib-Toshi	A. M. Turaz
2014	Hate Story 2	"Aaj Phir Tumpe"	Arijit Singh	Arko Pravo Mukherjee	
2014	Creature 3D	"Mohabbat Barsa De"	Arijit Singh, Arjun	Tony Kakkar	
2015	NH10	"Maati Ka Palang"	Solo	Samira Koppikar	Neeraj Rajawat
2016	Ishq Click	"Abhi Ajnabee" (Version 1)	Solo	Satish-Ajay	Satish Tripathi
2016	Pyaar Tune Kya Kiya	"Ishq Se Tu"	Rishabh Srivastava		
2016	Fuddu	"Aankhen Meri"	Sarosh Sami	Rana Majumdar, Sumeet Bellary	Satya Khare
2017	Dobaara: See Your Evil	"Ab Raat" (Version 1)	Arijit Singh	Samira Koppikar	Puneet Sharma
2017	Dobaara: See Your Evil	"Ab Raat" (Version 2)	Samira Koppikar, Jonathan Rebeiro	Samira Koppikar	Puneet Sharma
2017	Bareilly Ki Barfi	"Bairaagi"	Arijit Singh, Samira Koppikar	Samira Koppikar	Puneet Sharma
2017	Bareilly Ki Barfi	"Bairaagi" (Female)	Samira Koppikar	Samira Koppikar	Puneet Sharma
2019	Laal Kaptaan	"Taandav"	Kailash Kher, Brijesh Shandilya	Samira Koppikar	Puneet Sharma
2019	Laal Kaptaan	"Lahu Ka Rang Kara"	Samira Koppikar	Samira Koppikar	Sahib
2019	Laal Kaptaan	"Kaal Kaal"	Brijesh Shandilya, Dino James	Samira Koppikar	Saurabh Jain
2019	Laal Kaptaan	"Red Red Najariya"	Shreya Ghoshal	Samira Koppikar	Saurabh Jain
TBA	Bole Chudiyan	"Rehguzar"	Samira Koppikar, Shahid Mallya	Samira Koppikar	TBA

=== Indie music and collaborations ===
Year	Song	Singer-composer	Collaborations / Musicians	Lyrics
2014	"Bebasi"	Samira Koppikar	Indrajit Sharma, Prakash Sontakke, Kalyan Baruah, Gino Banks, Sheldon D'silva	Neeraj Rajawat
2019	"Kaanch Ke"	Samira Koppikar	Krishna Pradhan, Tejas Vinchurkar, Rahul Sharma	Neeraj Rajawat
2019	"Mashaalein"	Samira Koppikar	Jonathan Rebeiro, Hashmat & Sultana	Puneet Sharma
2019	"Dil Nachda"	Samira Koppikar & Sanam Puri	Samar Puri, Venky S, Keshav Dhanraj	Sahib
2020	"Tere Naam Sahare"	Samira Koppikar	Sanah Moidutty	Dino James
2021	"Baat Kya Hai"	Samira Koppikar	Samira Koppikar	Shellee
2021	"Iss Dil Ka"	Samira Koppikar	Samira Koppikar	Yash Eshwari
2023	"Sang Baarishon ke"	Samira Koppikar	Samira Koppikar	Samira Koppikar
2023	"Boondon ki Saazish"	Samira Koppikar	Samira Koppikar	Samira Koppikar
2023	"Prem Scam"	Samira Koppikar ft. Brijesh Shandilya	Samira Koppikar, Brijesh Shandilya	Samira Koppikar, Saurabh Jain

=== Non-film music for Zee Music Company ===
Year	Song	Singer	Composer	Lyrics
2020	"Main Yeh Haath Jo"	Samira Koppikar & Stebin Ben	Samira Koppikar	Neeraj Rajawat
2020	"Rabba Khaireya"	Stebin Ben & Samira Koppikar	Samira Koppikar	Yash Eshwari
2020	"Meherma"	Jonita Gandhi & Shashwat Singh	Samira Koppikar	Sahib
2020	"Mann Basiya"	Stebin Ben & Samira Koppikar	Samira Koppikar	Sahib
2020	"Ishq Tumpe Aise"	Bhaven Dhanak & Samira Koppikar	Samira Koppikar	Yash Eshwari
2020	"Khumariyaan"	Raj Barman & Samira Koppikar	Samira Koppikar	Shaheen Iqbal
2020	"La Ilm"	Samira Koppikar & Stebin Ben	Samira Koppikar	Shaheen Iqbal
2020	"Kaanch Ke"	Samira Koppikar	Samira Koppikar	Neeraj Rajawat
2020	"Mashaalein"	Samira Koppikar	Samira Koppikar	Puneet Sharma

=== Non-film album for Zee Music Company ===
Year	Song	Singer	Composer	Lyrics
2023	"Tujhe Pyaar"	Samira Koppikar & Raj Barman	Samira Koppikar	Yahya Bootwala
2023	"Raahatein"	Samira Koppikar	Samira Koppikar	Puneet Sharma
2023	"Chal Chalein Kahin Duur"	Samira Koppikar	Samira Koppikar	Sahib
2023	"Pehla Nasha"	Samira Koppikar & Bhaven Dhanak	Samira Koppikar	Yash Eshwari
2023	"Das Ki Kariye"	Samira Koppikar & Bhaven Dhanak	Samira Koppikar	Yash Eshwari
2023	"Beliya"	Samira Koppikar & Shashwat Singh	Samira Koppikar	Shaheen Iqbal
2023	"Ishqani Hawa"	Samira Koppikar	Samira Koppikar	Puneet Sharma
2023	"Dil Nu Laggeya"	Samira Koppikar	Samira Koppikar	Sahib

=== Non-film album 2 for Zee Music Company ===
Year	Song	Singer	Composer	Lyrics
2023	"Rootha Yaar"	Samira Koppikar	Samira Koppikar	Puneet Sharma
2023	"Jind Saiyyan"	Samira Koppikar, Paresh Pahuja	Samira Koppikar	Sahib
2023	"Dil Awara"	Samira Koppikar & Kinjal Chatterjee	Samira Koppikar	Yash Eshwari
2023	"Manchale"	Samira Koppikar & Lakshay Shikhar	Samira Koppikar	Sahib
2023	"Dhoop Chaanv"	Samira Koppikar	Samira Koppikar	Devendra Dangi
2023	"Khush Qismati"	Zyra Nargolwala & Bhaven Dhanak	Samira Koppikar	Devendra Dangi
2023	"Dil De Kol Kol"	Samira Koppikar & Kinjal Chatterjee	Samira Koppikar	Yash Eshwari
2023	"Sun Jaaniya"	Samira Koppikar & Shashwat Singh	Samira Koppikar	Sahib

== Indie music ==
Year	Song	Singer	Composer	Lyrics
2023	"Prem Scam"	Samira Koppikar	Brijesh Shandilya	Saurabh Jain, Samira Koppikar
2023	"Baat Kya Hai"	Samira Koppikar	Samira Koppikar	Shellee
2023	"Sang Baarishon Ke"	Samira Koppikar	Samira Koppikar	Samira Koppikar
2023	"Boondon Ki Saazish"	Samira Koppikar	Samira Koppikar	Samira Koppikar
2023	"Iss Dil Ka"	Samira Koppikar	Samira Koppikar	Yash Eshwari
2023	"Mohabbat Ki Wajah"	Samira Koppikar	Samira Koppikar	Samira Koppikar
2023	"Shartiya"	Samira Koppikar	Samira Koppikar	Neeraj Rajawat
2023	"World Cup Yeh Humara Hai"	Samira Koppikar	Samira Koppikar	Samira Koppikar
2023	"Tere Mere"	Samira Koppikar	Samira Koppikar	Samira Koppikar

== Awards and nominations ==
Award ceremony	Category	Nominated work	Result	Ref
63rd Filmfare Awards	Best Music Album	Bareilly Ki Barfi	Nominated	
10th Mirchi Music Awards	Female Vocalist of The Year	"Bairaagi" from Bareilly Ki Barfi	Nominated	
