= Vineet Kumar Singh =

Indian actor

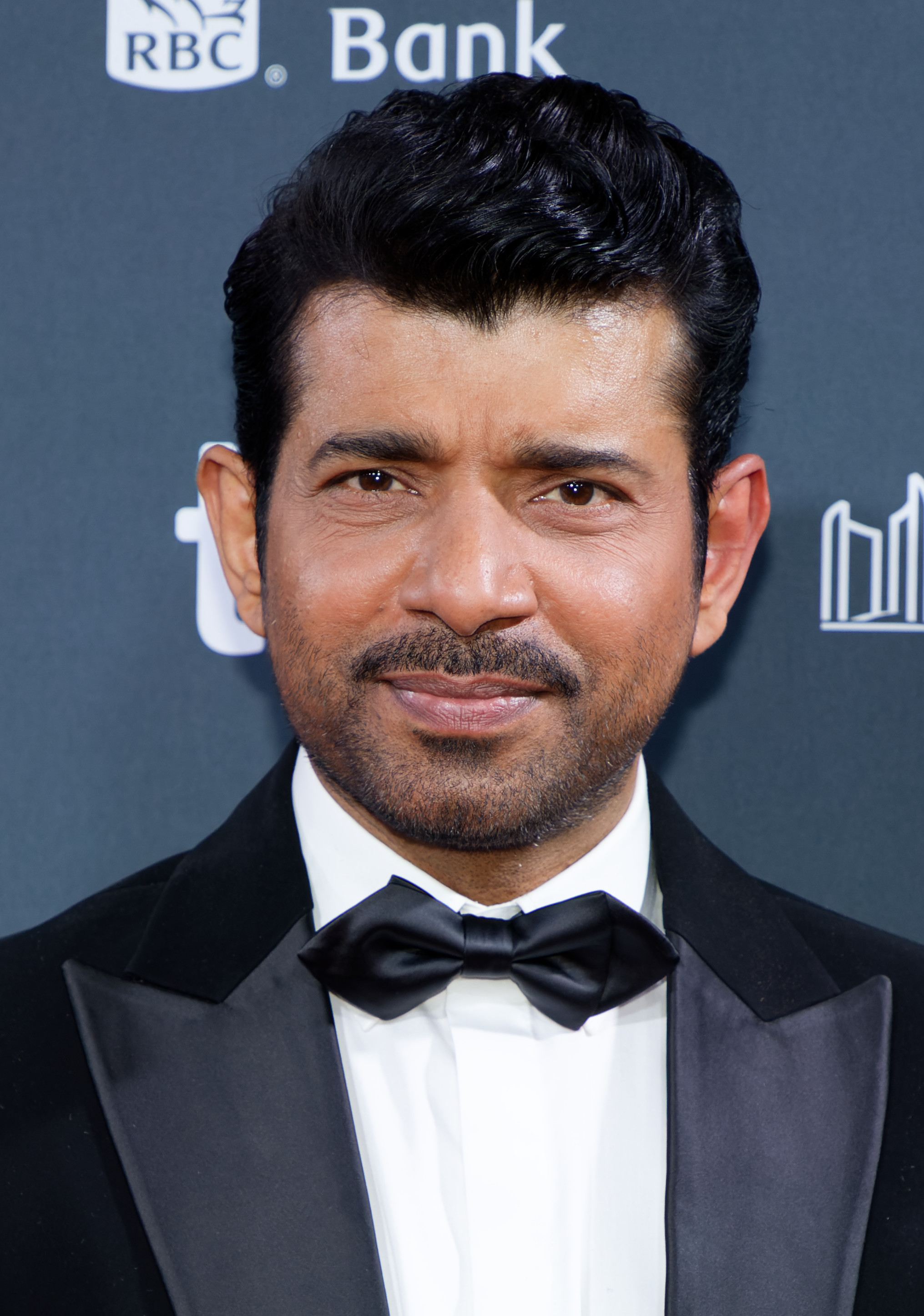
- Vineet Singh at the 2024 Toronto International Film Festival
- Born: 24 August 1978 (age 48) or 24 August 1981 (age 45); Varanasi, Uttar Pradesh, India
- Occupations: Actor; screenwriter
- Years active: 2002–present
- Spouse: Ruchira Ghormare (m. 2021)
- Children: 1

Vineet Kumar Singh (born 24 August 1978/1981) is an Indian actor and screenwriter, who works in Hindi cinema. He has starred in over twenty films. An M.D. in Ayurveda from Government Medical College and Hospital, Nagpur, Vineet began his acting career at the age of 21 with the movie Pitaah (2002). After few series of performances in his early career including the 2010 film City of Gold, he got noticed for his role in films like Bombay Talkies and Anurag Kashyap's Gangs of Wasseypur (2012). His role in Ugly (2014) and the portrayal of the character Milan Shukla in the film Daas Dev (2018) won him appreciation. He made his debut as lead actor in the 2018 Anurag Kashyap film Mukkabaaz for which he won two awards. Singh later received attention in 2025 with Chhaava and Superboys of Malegaon.

== Early life ==
Vineet Kumar Singh was born in Varanasi, Uttar Pradesh on 24 August 1978 or 1981 He was interested in sports and played Basketball at a National level. His father is a mathematician. Though Vineet wanted to join the National School of Drama, he could not pursue the same due to parental pressure and social norms. He is CPMT qualified and topper from his Medical College. He is a licensed medical practitioner, having attained his Bachelor of Ayurveda, Medicine and Surgery degree from R. A. Podar Ayurved Medical College and MD (Doctor of Medicine) in Ayurveda from Government Ayurvedic College and Hospital, Nagpur.

== Personal life ==
He married his longtime girlfriend Ruchiraa Ghormare on 29 November 2021. They have one child, a son born on 24 July 2025.

== Career ==
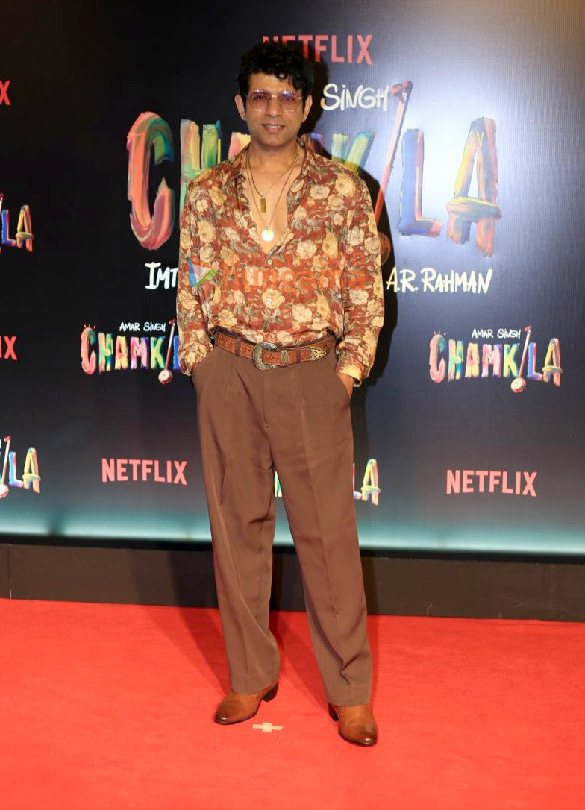
Singh at the 2024 screening of Amar Singh Chamkila

Singh came to Mumbai to participate in Superstars Talent Hunt. After winning the competition, actor-director Mahesh Manjrekar, who was one of the judges gave him a role in the Sanjay Dutt starrer Pitaah. The film was received poorly and Singh faced trouble getting further roles. He then worked as an associate / assistant director for Mahesh Manjrekar in films like Viruddh (2005) and Deh. In 2007, Singh left direction to focus solely on acting. After doing a few Bhojpuri serials and insignificant roles in films like Gori Tere Pyaar Mein and Isaaq, he got his break in the Hindi-Marathi bilingual City of Gold (2010). It was after film, he was cast by director Anurag Kashyap for the role of Danish Khan in Gangs of Wasseypur. He then acted in Ugly and Bombay Talkies (2013). His role in Ugly got him his first Screen nomination for Best Supporting Actor. He also appeared in Birla Sunlife and 7up Nimbooz commercials. Vineet was seen opposite Raima Sen in the 2016 Film Bollywood Diaries, directed by K.D. Satyam. In the 2018 film Mukkabaaz, the actor played the role of a boxer. Kumar trained hard for two years to prepare himself as the protagonist of this Anurag Kashyap film. He also won huge appreciation for his role of Milan Shukla in the film Daas Dev, directed by Sudhir Mishra. Singh has appeared in Akshay Kumar-starrer Gold (2018). In 2018, Singh was signed as the main lead with Prithvi Hatte in Aadhaar directed by Suman Ghosh and produced by Manish Mundra's Drishyam Films which deals with the government's controversial Aadhaar program.

In 2019, Singh had a supporting role in Saand Ki Aankh. He acted in Indian Air Force based biopic Gunjan Saxena co-starring Janhvi Kapoor, which was released in March 2020. and a Hindi remake of the Tamil film Thiruttu Payale 2, in which he will be seen opposite Urvashi Rautela.

In the Critics Choice Film Awards 2019, Singh received the Best Actor (male) award for his role in Mukkabaaz. He was nominated for Best Actor (Critics) award in the 64th Filmfare Awards for the film Mukkabaaz.

== Filmography ==
=== Films ===
Key
| † | Denotes films that have not yet been released |

| Year | Film | Role | Notes |
|---|---|---|---|
| 2002 | Pitaah | Bhola | |
| 2002 | Hathyar | Aslam | |
| 2007 | Chain Kulii Ki Main Kulii | Sohail | |
| 2008 | Jannat | Cricket team captain | |
| 2009 | Me Shivajiraje Bhosale Boltoy | Dubey | Marathi film |
| 2010 | City of Gold | Mohan | |
| 2011 | Ami Shubhash Bolchi | Dubey (neighbour taxi driver) | Bengali film |
| 2012 | Gangs of Wasseypur - Part 1 | Danish Khan | |
| 2012 | Gangs of Wasseypur – Part 2 | Danish Khan | |
| 2013 | Issaq | Bihata (Benvolio) | |
| 2013 | Shorts | Lallan | Segment Shor |
| 2013 | Bombay Talkies | Vijay | Segment Murabba |
| 2013 | Ugly | Chaitanya | |
| 2013 | Gori Tere Pyaar Mein | Villager | |
| 2016 | Bollywood Diaries | Daman | |
| 2018 | Mukkabaaz | Shravan Singh | Nominated—Filmfare Critics Award for Best Actor |
| 2018 | Daas Dev | Milan Shukla | |
| 2018 | Gold | Imtiaz | |
| 2019 | Saand Ki Aankh | Dr. Yashpal | |
| 2019 | Aadhaar | Pharsua | |
| 2020 | Gunjan Saxena: The Kargil Girl | Dileep Singh | |
| 2021 | Tryst With Destiny | Gautam | |
| 2022 | Siya | Mahender | |
| 2024 | Ghuspaithiya | Ravi Kumar | |
| 2025 | Match Fixing | Avinash Patwardhan | |
| 2025 | Chhaava | Kavi Kalash | |
| 2025 | Superboys of Malegaon | Farogh | |
| 2025 | Jaat | Somulu | |
| 2025 | Nishaanchi | Zabardast Pehelwaan | |
| 2025 | Tere Ishk Mein | V. Shekhawat | |

=== Web series ===
| Year | Film | Role | OTT | Ref. |
|---|---|---|---|---|
| 2019 | Bard of Blood | Veer Singh | Netflix | |
| 2020 | Betaal | Vikram Sirohi | Netflix | |
| 2022 | Rangbaaz: Darr Ki Rajneeti | Haroon Shah Ali Baig | ZEE5 | Season 3 |
| 2025 | Rangeen | Adarsh Johri | Amazon Prime Video | |
| 2025 | Rangbaaz The Bihar Chapter | Haroon Shah Ali Baig | ZEE5 | |
| 2026 | Hello Bachhon | Alakh Pandey | Netflix | |
| 2026 | Matka King | Darab Ahmed Wadkar | Amazon Prime Video | |

== Awards and nominations ==
| Year | Award | Category | Show | Result |
|---|---|---|---|---|
| 2018 | FOI Online Awards | Best Actor in a Leading Role | Mukkabaaz | Won |
| 2019 | Filmfare Awards | Best Actor (Critics) | Mukkabaaz | Nominated |
| 2019 | Critics' Choice Film Awards | Best Actor | Mukkabaaz | Won |
| 2019 | Screen Awards | Best Actor (Critics) | Mukkabaaz | Nominated |
