= Sunil Jogi =

Indian poet and author

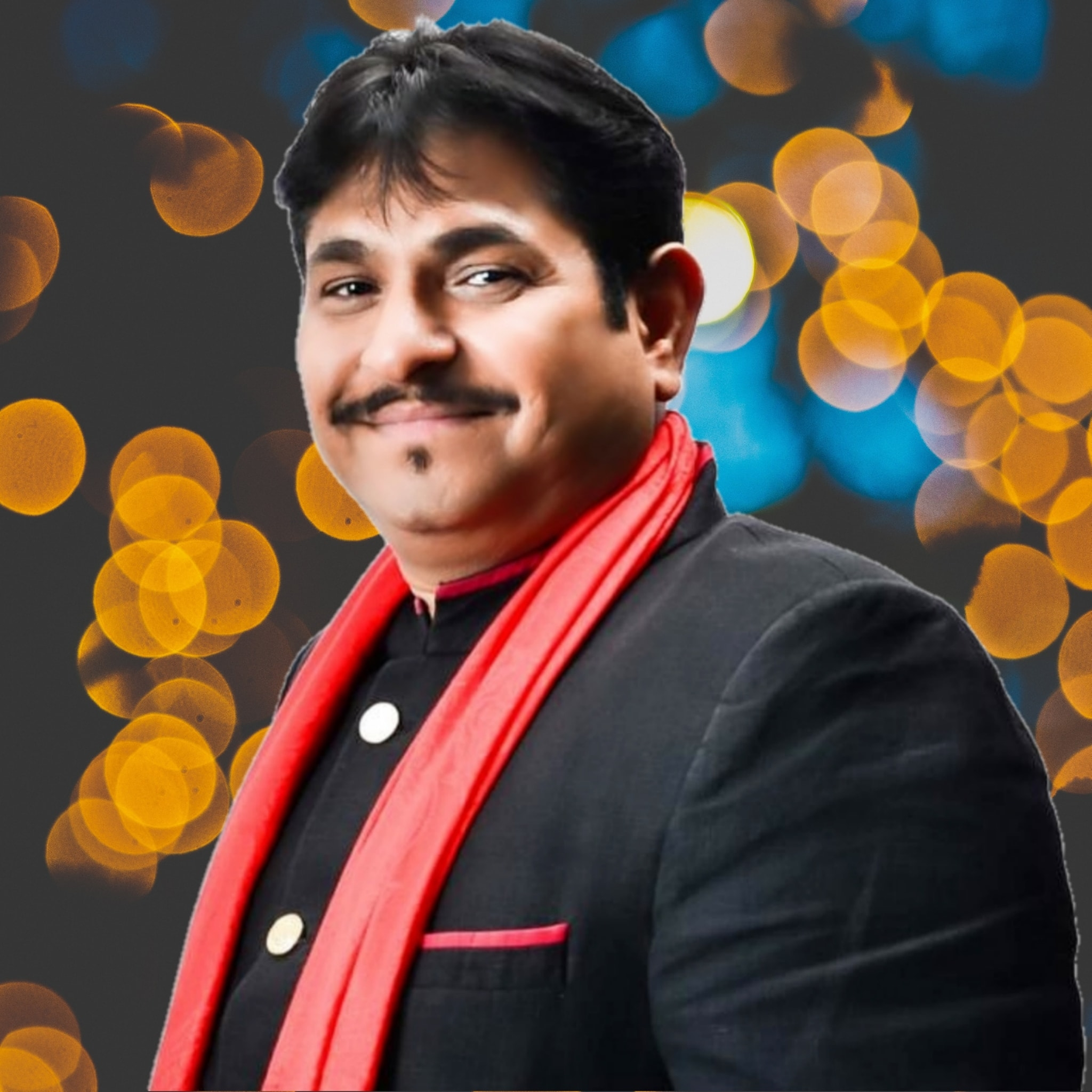
- Born: 1 January 1971 (age 55); Kanpur, Uttar Pradesh, India
- Occupations: Poet, author
- Awards: Padma Shri; Yash Bharti Award
- Website: https://drsuniljogi.com/

Sunil Jogi is an Indian author. He is a poet of comic verses and the ex-president of the Hindustani Academy, a post holding the rank of a Minister of State in the Government of Uttar Pradesh. He is also a Hindi adviser to the Ministry of Railways & Parliamentary Affairs.

== Life ==
Born on 1 January 1971, Jogi obtained his master's degree and doctoral degrees in Hindi. literature He is the author of over 100 books and is the president of MAA Foundation, New Delhi, a nonprofit organization promoting sustainable education in rural areas. Jogi was honored by the Government of India in 2015 with Padma Shri, the fourth highest Indian civilian award.
