= Rachita Arora =

Indian music composer

- Born: Delhi, India
- Occupation: Singer Composer

Rachita Arora is a singer and music composer in Indian movies. She is best known for her work in the Anurag Kashyap movie Mukkabaaz. Rachita hails from Delhi and is trained in Hindustani classical music.

== Career ==
Arora started her career by composing music for theatre plays in Delhi. In Mumbai, she met Makarand Deshpande at Prithvi Theatre who liked her work and asked her to produce music for him. Arora composed the music for his 50th original play, Epic Gadbad.

Rachita's first film was the Rajkummar Rao film Newton. Before entering the film industry, Rachita composed music for theatre. She also composed music for ‘Mumbai Paani Mafia’ a documentary telecast on Discovery Channel, India.

Deshpande later introduced her to Anurag Kashyap. Rachita went on to compose the music for Kashyap's movie Mukkabaaz. Later they team again when she lent her voice to the music of Choked (film).

== Filmography ==
- Kanjoos Makhichoos(Background Score)(2023)
- Kaala Paani(Composer)(2023)
- Decoupled (Composer, Singer) (2021)
- Choked (film) (Composer) (2020)
- Kanpuriye (2019)
- Judgementall Hai Kya (2019)
- Sacred Games (2018)
- Karenjit Kaur – The Untold Story of Sunny Leone (Web series) (2018)
- Mukkabaaz (Composer) (2018)
- Shubh Mangal Saavdhan (Background Score) (2017)
- Gurgaon (Promotional Songs) (2017)
- Newton ('Chal Tu Apna Kam Kar' Song) (2017)
