= Margarita with a Straw (soundtrack) =

Soundtrack album by Mikey McCleary and Joi Barua
- Released: 3 April 2015
- Recorded: 2014–2015
- Genre: Feature film soundtrack
- Length: 30:26
- Label: Zee Music Company
- Producer: Mikey McCleary

Mikey McCleary and Joi Barua chronology
Pizza (2014)	Margarita with a Straw (2015)	Bombay Velvet (2015)

Mithoon chronology
Joi: Looking out of the Window (2010)	Margarita with a Straw (2014)	Marksheet (2014)

Margarita with a Straw is the soundtrack to the 2015 film of the same name directed by Shonali Bose and stars Kalki Koechlin. The film's musical score is composed by Mikey McCleary who also scored six songs for the film. The soundtrack features all of his compositions, including an instrumental theme and a song "Dusokute" composed by Joi Barua as a guest composer. The lyrics for the songs were written by Prasoon Joshi with McCleary also contributing two English songs. The album was released by Zee Music Company on 3 April 2015.

== Development ==
McCleary read Bose's script which he liked it and connected musically in styles they liked the film. They did not want the music to be melodramatic and kept a light-hearted tone. Certain sequences such as a band is playing jazz music in a bar, or a romantic montage, he composed the score according to the situations in the film. He worked on the background music for over two years, which felt it "came very quickly to me" and the idea was to capture the sound of the film and keep the sense of beauty intact. He introduced rock singer-songwriter Vivienne Pocha to provide vocals for the English song "I Need A Man" and model-turned-singer Rachel Varghese, who sang "Choone Chali Aasman". Upon his introduction, McCleary said that he wanted an "uplifting" and "expressive" voice to contribute the vocals, reminsicent of singer-songwriter Adele and Varghese was a perfect fit for the film.

The songs "I Need A Man" and "Don't Go Running Off Anytime Soon" were used for the English version when it was screened at international film festivals. McCleary described the latter as a "nice romantic ballad with colloquial words" which was to have something "romantic" and "light" capturing the fresh energy and excitement between the relationship of the lead characters. It was then shot as an independent music video in New York City, released after the film.

Joi Barua was roped in as the guest composer, who provided music and also sung for "Dusokute" (lit. 'In her eyes'). Barua described it as a breezy, uptempo rock songs having the listener "to feel the inertia kicking in right from the start and a sense of motion that carried throughout. Almost like running, or biking". The song conveyed a distinct sense of optimism, youth, hope and love like how the characters felt. Originally written by Barua in Assamese the song was later rewritten by Prasoon Joshi in also had a duet version co-performed by Sharmistha Chatterjee.

== Track listing ==
No.	Title	Lyrics	Music	Singer(s)	Length
1.	"Dusokute"	Prasoon Joshi	Joi Barua	Joi Barua	2:30
2.	"Dusokute" (Duet version)	Prasoon Joshi	Joi Barua	Joi Barua, Sharmistha Chatterjee	4:41
3.	"Foreign Balamwa"	Prasoon Joshi	Mikey McCleary	Sonu Kakkar	2:28
4.	"Choone Chali Aasman"	Prasoon Joshi	Mikey McCleary	Rachel Varghese	3:53
5.	"Meri Aadat Mera Hissa"	Prasoon Joshi	Mikey McCleary	Anushka Manchanda	2:24
6.	"I Need a Man"	Mikey McCleary	Mikey McCleary	Vivienne Pocha	2:45
7.	"Don't Go Running Off Anytime Soon"	Mikey McCleary	Mikey McCleary	Mikey Mccleary	2:56
8.	"Aai's Aalap"	Prasoon Joshi	Mikey McCleary	Rajnigandha Shekhawat	4:04
9.	"Laila's Theme" (instrumental)	—	Mikey McCleary	—	3:28

== Reception ==
Critics such as Kasmin Fernandes and Joginder Tuteja gave positive reviews of the soundtrack's unconventional style. The former appreciated Barua's "energetic vocals" in "Dusokute" and the "desi yet classy" number "Foreign Balamwa" in her 3-out-of-5-star review for The Times of India. She described the lyrics by Joshi as "cheerful", but was less impressed by McCleary's "passable" writing. Tuteja, writing for Bollywood Hungama, noted the album's lack of a commercial appeal and wrote that at best it "fit[s] in well into the stage and setting that the film stands for". He praised McCleary's command of the English compositions and his "boyish charm" as a vocalist. Tuteja was particularly impressed by Pocha's "thumping vocals" in "I Need a Man" and the serene effect of the final two tracks of the album. He also found the choice of such artists as Manchanda and Kakkar odd for what he described as an album heavily influenced by Western music. Bryan Durham of the Daily News and Analysis considered the duo's respective tracks "unusual" and "candid". He singled out the instrumental number, "Laila's Theme", as "the beating heart of the film".

== Accolades ==
At the 9th Asian Film Awards held in 25 March 2015, McCleary won the Best Composer award for his musical score, becoming the first Hindi film to do so.
