= Haseen Dillruba =

2021 Indian film by Vinil Mathew

- Official release poster
- Directed by: Vinil Mathew
- Written by: Kanika Dhillon
- Produced by: Eros International; Aanand L. Rai; Himanshu Sharma; Bhushan Kumar; Krishan Kumar
- Starring: Taapsee Pannu; Vikrant Massey; Harshvardhan Rane
- Cinematography: Jaya Krishna Gummadi
- Edited by: Shweta Venkat Matthew
- Music by: Songs: Amit Trivedi; Score: Amar Mangrulkar
- Production companies: Colour Yellow Productions; T-Series; Eros International
- Distributed by: Netflix
- Release date: 2 July 2021
- Running time: 136 minutes
- Country: India
- Language: Hindi

Haseen Dillruba (transl. 'Beautiful Beloved') is a 2021 Indian Hindi-language romantic thriller film directed by Vinil Mathew and written by Kanika Dhillon. It stars Taapsee Pannu, Vikrant Massey and Harshvardhan Rane.

The film premiered on 2 July 2021 on Netflix. It received mixed reviews from critics. Haseen Dilruba emerged as the most-watched Hindi film on Netflix of that year, reaching top 10 in 22 countries. A sequel titled Phir Aayi Hasseen Dillruba premiered on Netflix on 9 August 2024.

== Plot ==
Rani Kashyap Saxena, a housewife, is outside her home, feeding dogs, when her house suddenly explodes, presumably killing her husband, Rishab "Rishu" Saxena. The police find a body charred-beyond-recognition, with a severed hand which Rani identifies as Rishu's. The movie alternates between the past (narrated in flashback) and the present; the reality of the explosion is interwoven with the police investigation going on in the present-day.

A flashback reveals the arranged marriage between the two, where Rishu fell for Rani instantly, while she married him only because her boyfriend had abandoned her. There remain tensions and awkwardness between her, Rishu, and his family after the marriage. To add to the tense atmosphere, a nervous Rishu fails to consummate. The next day, he overhears her telling her mother and aunt about his failure to have sex. Hurt, he stops acknowledging her completely and their relation deteriorates. His well-built and charming cousin Neel Tripathi comes over to visit, and Rani gets attracted to him. They subsequently begin a passionate affair. Rani falls in love and even learns how to cook mutton, despite being a vegetarian. Some time later, she tells Neel that she would like to marry him. Afraid of commitment, Neel panics and flees. Hurt, Rani blurts out the truth to Rishu. He develops a dislike of her but still protects her from others who chastise her actions.

Meanwhile, in present-day, the police, aware of the history between Rani and Rishu, are convinced that she and Neel planned and killed Rishu. They use polygraphs and various methods to find out her motive. They find footage where Neel is escaping from the house moments before the explosion. They also catch Rani cheating during one of the polygraph tests by manipulating her blood pressure.

In the past, after Rani tells Rishu the truth about her and Neel, Rishu transforms into a sadist and deliberately causes physical harm to Rani multiple times while also trying to kill Neel, who knocks Rishu out when he tries to kill him. Having fallen in love with Rishu, Rani endures it all as repentance. Over time though, they reconcile and genuinely fall in love, becoming intimate.

Narrating the events of the day-of-explosion, Rani tells the police that Neel came over to visit and got into an argument with them. Rishu, subsequently, wanting to settle things with him, asked Rani to wait outside. The explosion occurred soon after. The police know that she is lying but fail to find any evidence or misdoing in her polygraph. Rani is subsequently acquitted and leaves the police station smirking.

It is revealed that when Neel came over, he tried to blackmail them using Rani's Sex tapes. Angered by this, Rishu attacked him and both men got into a physical fight. Rani hit Neel over the head with a mutton leg when he had the upper hand and was strangling him. Not wanting to be jailed, they dress the crime-scene with Rishu cutting off his own hand and placing it next to Neel's body. They rig the gas stove to blow up and Rishu leaves through the backdoor, dressed as Neel. Rani goes out and gets the mutton leg chopped, which she later feeds to the dogs. The explosion occurs and covers up their evidence of murder.

Five years later, the police inspector, while leaving town, buys a copy of a murder-thriller book that Rani had talked about multiple times in her statement. Reading the book, he realises the real story but can no longer do anything about it. The ending shows the couple reuniting, Rishu without his left hand.

== Cast ==
- Taapsee Pannu as Rani Kashyap Saxena
- Vikrant Massey as Rishabh "Rishu" Saxena
- Harshvardhan Rane as Neel Tripathi
- Ashish Verma as Afzar
- Yamini Das as Lata Saxena
- Dayashankar Pandey as Brijraj Saxena
- Aditya Srivastava as Inspector Kishore Rawat
- Siddhant Ghegadmal as Ajit
- Alka Kaushal as Mrs. Kashyap
- Amit Singh Thakur as Mr. Kashyap
- Puja Sarup as Beena Masi
- Atul Tiwari as Senior Inspector
- Deepesh Jagdish as Navrangi
- Aashiq Hussein as Rastogi
- Alok Chatterjee as Gandhi
- Akash G as Policeman
- Preeti Singh as Bindiya
- Shyaam Kishore as Misra
- Shivaji Satam as Ajinkya

== Production ==
Screenwriter Kanika Dhillon approached director Vinil Mathew to make a film based on the script she had written. Vinil, whose last film, the romantic comedy Hasee Toh Phasee released in 2014, was eager to make a film based on a different genre. He agreed to direct the film due to the dark nature of human relationships explored in the script. Actress Taapsee Pannu agreed to the film as she liked the blend of the thriller and romance genres in the script.

Principal photography began on 18 January 2020 in Haridwar. In March 2020, the shooting was cancelled due to the COVID-19 outbreak. The shooting wrapped up on 29 October 2020 in Mumbai.

== Soundtrack ==
Haseen Dillruba

Soundtrack album by Amit Trivedi
- Released: 2 July 2021
- Recorded: 2020
- Genre: Feature film soundtrack
- Length: 16:18
- Language: Hindi
- Label: T-Series

Amit Trivedi chronology
Gunjan Saxena: The Kargil Girl (2020)	Haseen Dillruba (2021)	Rashmi Rocket (2021)
External audio
- Haseen Dillruba Jukebox on YouTube

The film score was composed by Amar Mangrulkar who previously composed the score for the director's feature debut Hasee Toh Phasee, besides having composed for most of his television commercials. Mangrulkar's score earned him a Filmfare nomination for best background score . The songs featured in the film were composed by Amit Trivedi with lyrics written by Varun Grover, Kshitij Patwardhan and Sidhant Mago. Trivedi also earned a Filmfare nomination for the songs.

Track listing
No.	Title	Lyrics	Singer(s)	Length
1.	"Dil Melt Karda"	Varun Grover	Navraj Hans, Nikhita Gandhi	3:21
2.	"Phisal Jaa Tu"	Kshitij Patwardhan	Abhijeet Srivastava	4:01
3.	"Milaa Yun"	Kshitij Patwardhan	Yashita Sharma, Abhay Jodhpurkar	3:41
4.	"Lakeeran"	Sidhant Mago	Asees Kaur, Devenderpal Singh	3:32
5.	"Milaa Yun" (Slow Version)	Kshitij Patwardhan	Yashita Sharma, Abhay Jodhpurkar	1:43
Total length:				16:18

== Reception ==
The film received mixed reviews from critics. On the review aggregator website Rotten Tomatoes, 62% of 13 critics' reviews are positive, with an average rating of 5/10.

Ronak Kotecha of The Times of India gave it 3.5 stars out of 5 and called it "a delectably dark and defiant love story with a thrilling twist", while praising Pannu's "pitch-perfect expressions". Stutee Ghosh of The Quint awarded 3.5 stars out of 5 and praised and added that "the only way Haseen Dillruba truly works is if we unequivocally surrender to its pulpy universe". The Statesman review wrote that "it’s smart in the way it invests 135 minutes of storytelling to mix suspense and wry humour." Manisha Lakhe of Moneycontrol compared the film to the Billie Eilish song All the Good Girls Go to Hell and found it to be "delightful and different from the usual ‘Indian Originals’ fare we get to see on OTT platforms like Netflix". Devesh Sharma of Filmfare was pleased by the use of film noir tropes by Mathew and Dhillon and concluded, "Watch it for its dark take on love and for the brilliant performances by the entire ensemble cast."

In a mixed review, Saibal Chatterjee of NDTV called the film "sometimes good, sometimes not" like the relationship between the central characters, and considered Massey's performance to be the best in it. Anna M. M. Vetticad of Firstpost gave a rating of 1/5 describing it as an "illogical crime saga wrapped in a clichéd ode to violent, frenzied love". She criticised the writing of the film, "the pallid writing explains Pannu’s deadpan performance in the film whereas Massey who has been consistently superb in his work so far is only marginally interesting" but praised Rane's performance and wrote, "Harshvardhan Rane plays the only attention-grabbing character in Haseen Dillruba". Shubhra Gupta from The Indian Express gave Haseen Dilruba a rating of 2/5 and wrote, "The film has sex, lies and a smutty video, but no frisson". She praised Massey's performance by stating, "Pannu’s delivery is exactly the same in all her films, only the costumes change; Rane is appropriately heavy-lidded; The only one who tries valiantly to rise, and succeeds in most places is Vikrant Massey". Tanul Thakur of The Wire called the film “is a collection of obvious tropes and recycled characters” adding that “ Haseen Dillruba is afflicted by familiar flaws tainting mainstream Bollywood. The film wants to reach a certain point, but its journey is devoid of convincing reasons or considered nuance.”

Rohan Naahar from Hindustan Times called Haseen Dilruba a "hot mess" and described it as an "illogical" and "ill-conceived" film. Criticising the performances he wrote, "Pannu’s performance as a bored housewife named Rani is all over the place", "Massey is a good actor, but severely let down by a script" and described Tripathi, "a complete waste of Rane's considerable screen presence". Mugdha Kapoor Safaya from DNA India gave Haseen Dilruba a rating of 3/5 and described the film as an "not-so-nail-biting whodunit". She praised the performance of Massey and called him the "saving grace" of the film but criticised others by stating, "Taapsee on the other hand does not bring anything new to the table; From her dialogue delivery to her expressions, it's like watching her in any of her previous films. The supporting characters and Rane aren't great either; They deserve better". Srivatsan S from The Hindu wrote, "Haseen Dilruba has the aesthetics of a raunchy B-Grade movie, and has a crime-thriller premise at the centre, resulting in something that looks cluttered and inconsequential".

== Accolades ==
Award	Date of the ceremony	Category	Recipients	Result	Ref.
67th Filmfare Awards	30 August 2022	Best Actress (Critics')	Taapsee Pannu	Nominated	
67th Filmfare Awards	30 August 2022	Best Actor (Critics')	Vikrant Massey	Nominated	
67th Filmfare Awards	30 August 2022	Best Story	Kanika Dhillon	Nominated	
67th Filmfare Awards	30 August 2022	Best Music Director	Amit Trivedi	Nominated	
67th Filmfare Awards	30 August 2022	Best Lyrics	Kshitij Patwardhan – for "Phisal Jaa Tu"	Nominated	
67th Filmfare Awards	30 August 2022	Best Playback Singer (Male)	Devendrapal Singh – for "Lakeeran"	Nominated	
67th Filmfare Awards	30 August 2022	Best Playback Singer (Female)	Asees Kaur – for "Lakeeran"	Nominated	
67th Filmfare Awards	30 August 2022	Best Background Score	Amar Mangrulkar	Nominated	

== Sequel ==
A sequel titled Phir Aayi Hasseen Dillruba was announced in January 2023, starring Pannu and Massey alongside Sunny Kaushal, with a release scheduled for 9 August 2024 on Netflix.
