= Jayprad Desai =

Indian film director

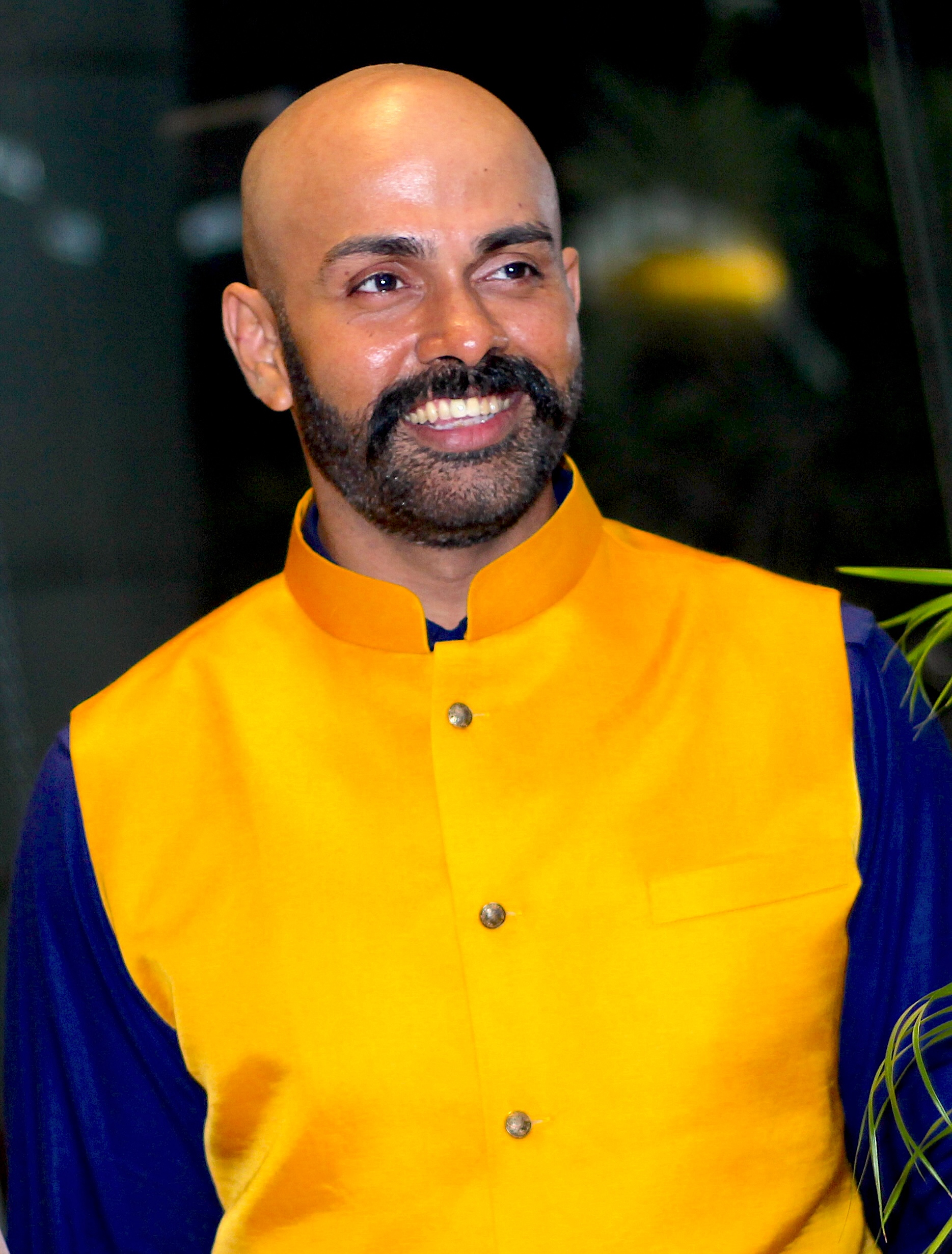
- Occupation(s): Director, Screenwriter, Producer
- Years active: 2015–present
- Notable work: Phir Aayi Hasseen Dillruba; Kaun Pravin Tambe?; Mukhbir - The Story of a Spy; Nagrik

Jayprad Desai is an Indian film director, screenwriter and producer. He is best known for directing Kaun Pravin Tambe? (2022), Mukhbir - The Story of a Spy (2022), and Phir Aayi Hasseen Dillruba (2024). He made his directorial debut with Nagrik (2015), a Marathi political drama thriller. He is the grandnephew of composer Vasant Desai.

== Career ==
His first directorial venture Nagrik, a Marathi political drama-thriller, revolving around a struggling middle class journalist, won several accolades including Maharashtra State Awards for Best Social Film. It was also selected at multiple prestigious film festivals such as MAMI and IFFI.

He later went on to create 'Hutatma' (2019), a historical-fiction thriller web series set against the Samyukta Maharashtra Movement. It was received well by critics as well as audiences and went on to win big at the MA TA Sanman including Best Web Series.

In 2022, Desai directed Kaun Pravin Tambe?, a biographical sports drama film. The film is based on the life of cricketer Pravin Tambe, who made his debut in professional cricket at the age of 41. The movie stars Shreyas Talpade as Tambe and explores Tambe's journey of becoming a professional cricketer. The film highlights his passion, perseverance, and determination to achieve his dreams despite facing numerous challenges and setbacks. The film was also nominated for the Filmfare Awards 2022 and it is one of the most viewed Hindi films released in 2022.

Mukhbir (2022) a period spy thriller web series which Jayprad co-wrote and co-directed with Shivam Nair won immense critical acclaim and became the most watched original series on Zee5 of 2022 with over 15 million views in less than 2 weeks. It went on to win numerous awards for Best Series, as well as Best Story, Screenplay and Dialogue. It was also nominated at the Filmfare OTT awards 2022 for Best Series.

Phir Aayi Hasseen Dillruba (2024) starring Taapsee Pannu, Vikrant Massey, Sunny Kaushal and Jimmy Shergill and produced by Aanand L Rai under Colour Yellow Productions and T-Series premiered on Netflix on 9 August 2024 to a stupendous opening.

== Filmography ==
| Year | Film | Language | Notes |
|---|---|---|---|
| 2015 | Nagrik | Marathi | Director, Writer |
| 2019 | Hutatma | | Writer, Director and Co-producer |
| 2022 | Kaun Pravin Tambe? | Hindi | Director |
| 2022 | Mukhbir - The Story of a Spy | Hindi | Director, Writer |
| 2024 | Phir Aayi Hasseen Dillruba | Hindi | Director |
