= Manmarziyaan =

2018 Indian film by Anurag Kashyap

- Theatrical release poster
- Directed by: Anurag Kashyap
- Written by: Kanika Dhillon
- Produced by: Aanand L. Rai; Vikas Bahl; Vikramaditya Motwane; Madhu Mantena; Anurag Kashyap; Kishore Lulla
- Starring: Abhishek Bachchan; Vicky Kaushal; Taapsee Pannu
- Cinematography: Sylvester Fonseca
- Edited by: Aarti Bajaj
- Music by: Amit Trivedi
- Production companies: Eros International; Colour Yellow Productions; Phantom Films
- Distributed by: Eros International
- Release dates: 8 September 2018 (TIFF); 14 September 2018
- Running time: 156 minutes
- Country: India
- Language: Hindi
- Box office: est. ₹40.39 crore

Manmarziyaan (transl. The Heart's Wish) is a 2018 Indian Hindi-language romantic comedy drama film directed by Anurag Kashyap and written by Kanika Dhillon. Jointly produced by Phantom Films and Aanand L. Rai's Colour Yellow Productions, the film stars Abhishek Bachchan, Vicky Kaushal, and Taapsee Pannu.

Manmarziyaan premiered at the 2018 Toronto International Film Festival. It released in India on 14 September 2018 to positive reviews from critics.

== Plot ==
Rumi, a young woman, is in love with Vicky, a part-time DJ. After they are caught together by Rumi's family, they pressure the couple to marry. Rumi promises her family that Vicky will come with his parents to formally ask for her hand in marriage; if he fails to do so, she will marry whomever her family chooses. However, Vicky repeatedly gets cold feet due to his nervousness and immaturity.

Eventually, Rumi gives up on Vicky and agrees to an arranged marriage with Robbie, a mature and responsible banker. Although she accepts his proposal, she refuses to marry him the night before the wedding, believing that Vicky has finally changed. Vicky, however, backs out again, and Rumi marries Robbie the following day.

Rumi gradually becomes comfortable with Robbie. When Vicky later approaches Robbie and reveals his relationship with Rumi, she tells Robbie that she wants to remain married to him. Robbie reminds her that the choice is hers. The following day, Rumi sleeps with Vicky. Suspicious of her actions, Robbie follows Rumi and discovers her with Vicky. When he asks her whom she considers her true love, Rumi remains silent. Realising that she has been unfaithful, Robbie is hurt. When confronted, he admits that he loves Rumi but tells her that she and Vicky deserve each other. The following day, Robbie files for an annulment.

Vicky eventually agrees to marry Rumi. However, Rumi tells him that she doesn't want to marry him and would rather be alone. Vicky leaves for Australia and in the end Robbie and Rumi get back together.

== Cast ==
- Abhishek Bachchan as Robbie Bhatia
- Vicky Kaushal as Vicky Sandhu
- Taapsee Pannu as Rumi Bagga
- Jasmine Bajwa as Keerat
- Ashnoor Kaur as Kiran
- Swairaj Sandhu as Robbie's father
- Neelu Kohli as Robbie's mother
- Sukhmani Sadana as Lovely Singh
- Saurabh Sachdeva as Kakaji
- Arshpreet Singh as Babloo
- Abdul Quadir Amin as Samar
- Gaurav Amlani as Raja
- Akshay Arora as Rumi's Chacha
- Arun Bali as Rumi's grandfather
- Toranj Kayvon as Raja's girlfriend
- Vikram Kochhar as Robbie's brother

== Production ==
Sameer Sharma was initially signed to direct the film and had shot portions of it. However, producer Aanand L. Rai was dissatisfied with the rough cut and subsequently halted production. Rai then approached Ashwiny Iyer Tiwari to direct the film, but she declined due to prior commitments. In November 2016, Anurag Kashyap was announced as the film's new director.

Dulquer Salmaan, Ayushmann Khurrana and Bhumi Pednekar were initially reported to be part of the cast, but subsequently left the project. Abhishek Bachchan was later cast in place of Salmaan, marking his return to acting following a two-year hiatus. The film was shot primarily in Punjab, with additional filming taking place in Delhi and Kashmir.

== Reception ==
=== Box office ===
Manmarziyaan collected ₹4 crore on its opening day. In its theatrical run, the film grossed ₹40.39 crore worldwide.

=== Critical response ===
Manmarziyaan received positive reviews from critics, with particular praise for its contemporary take on a love story and the overall strong performances from its cast. Additionally, it also received high praise for seamlessly weaving its soundtrack into the story. As a love-triangle with a running length of 155 minutes, the subject matter was a venture into conventional Bollywood territory for director Anurag Kashyap.

Critic Anupama Chopra noted "director Anurag Kashyap, Hindi cinema's high-priest of darkness, turns his ferocious gaze on relationships. Obviously then, this is not the routine Bollywood meet-cute. Director Kashyap and writer Kanika Dhillon have created a fully realized world that is fueled by Amit Trivedi's pulsating soundtrack" Times Of India's critic Rachit Gupta said "The maturity with which Anurag Kashyap’s Manmarziyaan talks about love and relationships is refreshing. The seemingly conventional story of a love triangle, gets original with its treatment and portrayal of love. With characters constantly oscillating between confusion and complex emotions, Manmarziyaan presents a new and updated look at romance and relationships."

Raja Sen, writing for Hindustan Times, critiqued the film saying "There is authenticity to the texture, but this film could have held more. It is ultimately a disappointment not because of its craft, but because of predictability, self-indulgent pace and its irritating attempt to be both a light crowd-pleaser with a cutesy ending as well as an impassioned, volatile romance." Filmfare critic Debesh Sharma adds "Shot well by Sylvester Fonseca and edited well by Aarti Bajaj, the film scores on technical fronts as well."

The film received a limited international release with the title Husband Material including a premiere at the Toronto International Film Festival in September 2018.

== Soundtrack ==
The original soundtrack and background score of Manmarziyaan was composed by Amit Trivedi in his maiden collaboration with Aanand L. Rai and third with Kashyap following Dev.D (2009) and Bombay Velvet (2015) while the lyrics were written by Shellee, Prabh Deep and Sikander Kahlon. Trivedi worked on the film's music for around two years, understanding the nuances of the folk music of Punjab and combined traditional Punjabi instrumentation with electronic music; he had previously also composed music for Kashyap-produced Luv Shuv Tey Chicken Khurana (2012), which featured a more rural setting and also featured songs written by Shellee. He further introduced new talents from Punjab, for nativity and their authentic raw vocals, which Kashyap was attracted to.

The collaboration between Trivedi and Kashyap was highly anticipated post the musical success of Dev.D (2009) and Bombay Velvet (2015) and capitalising with the hype, the film's soundtrack was promoted in an unusual manner, with the first ten songs from the album—beginning with "F for Fyaar"—released everyday from 10 August 2018, and a concert tour was held to promote the album. It was released through Eros Music on 5 September 2018 to critical acclaim and was considered as one of the best Hindi film soundtracks of the decade.

== Awards and nominations ==
| Award | Date of ceremony | Category | Nominee | Result | Ref. |
|---|---|---|---|---|---|
| Screen Awards | 16 December 2018 | Best Actress | Taapsee Pannu | Nominated | |
| Screen Awards | 16 December 2018 | Best Music Director | Amit Trivedi | Won | |
| Filmfare Awards | 23 March 2019 | Best Music Director | Amit Trivedi | Nominated | |
| Filmfare Awards | 23 March 2019 | Best Background Score | Amit Trivedi | Nominated | |
