= Vinil Mathew =

Indian filmmaker

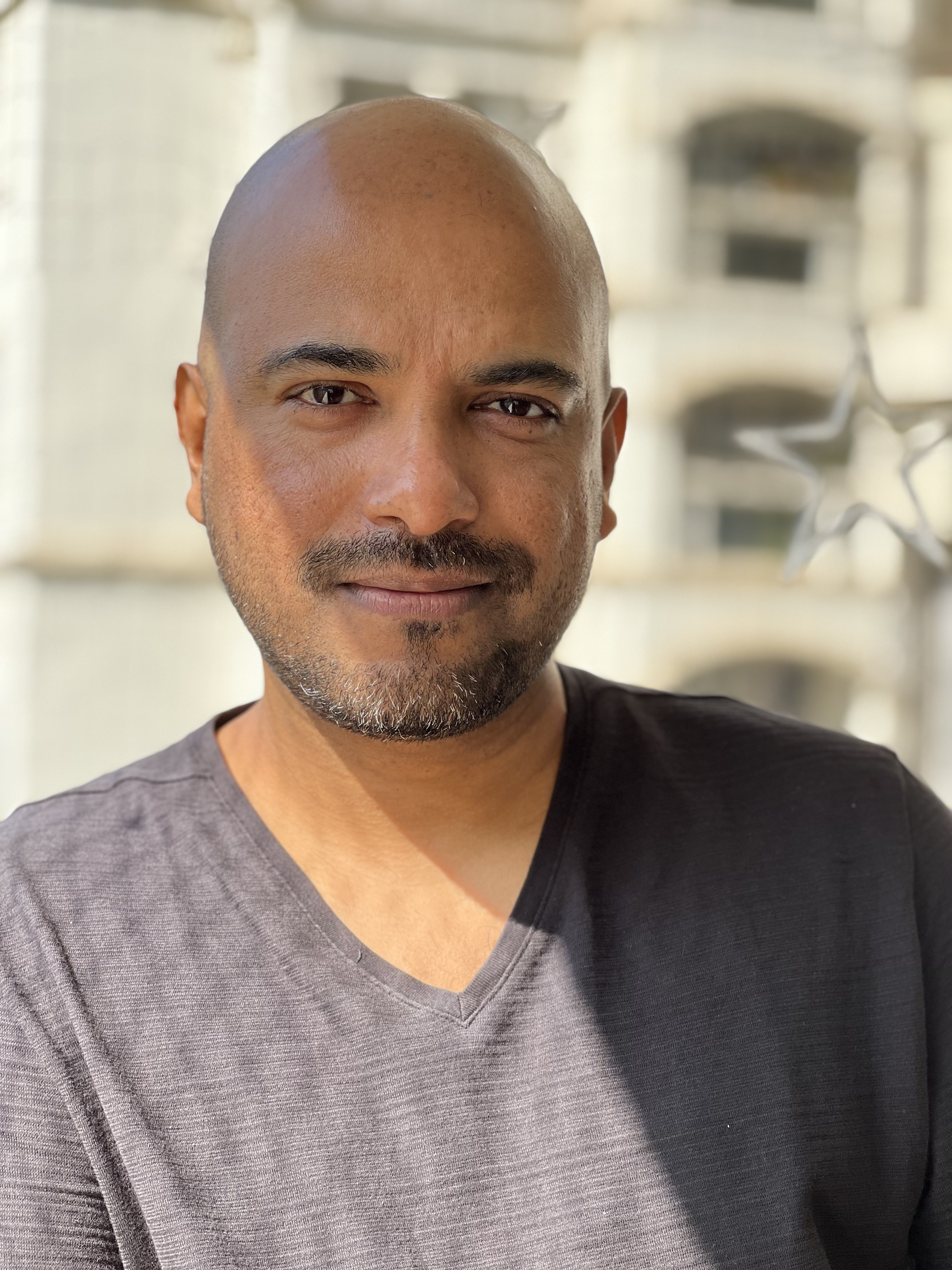
- Born: 1977 (age 48–49); Delhi, India
- Education: Film and Television Institute of India
- Occupations: Film director, advertisement director, writer
- Years active: 2000–present
- Spouse: Shweta Venkat-Matthew

Vinil Mathew (born 1977) is an Indian filmmaker and writer, who predominantly directs and produces television commercials. He has also directed two feature films. After studying filmmaking at the Film and Television Institute of India (FTII), he made advertisement campaigns for several brands, including Vodafone, Nescafe and Cadbury.

In feature films, Vinil has directed the 2014 romantic comedy Hasee Toh Phasee, which was a critical and commercial success, and the 2021 romantic thriller Haseen Dillruba, which became the most-watched Hindi film on Netflix of that year.

== Early life ==
Vinil Mathew was born in a Malayali family in Delhi. He went to St. Columba's School, Delhi. Vinil was interested in films from a young age and said that watching Mani Ratnam's Roja (1992) when he was in class 10 inspired him to be a filmmaker.

Vinil pursued Economics honours from Delhi University. After graduation, he studied filmmaking at the Film and Television Institute of India. He then studied films further at the University of Television and Film Munich, where he made his graduating short film Danke schon Bitte Schon.

== Career ==
=== Advertising ===
Vinil moved to Mumbai in 2000 and joined the advertisement company, Highlight Films, where he assisted Prasoon Pandey. After two years, he started his own production company named Nomad Films. He then joined Footcandles films, under which he worked on advertisements for Reliance, Vodafone and Airtel. In the ad for the last of these brands, he directed Vidya Balan and R. Madhavan. He went on to make over 250 ad campaigns, including one popular one for Cadbury.

In 2014, Vinil opened his own production company Breathless Films, which produces advertisements. The company has launched campaigns for the brands Lays, Voot and Club Mahindra, among others.

=== Films ===
In 2003, Vinil directed a television film for the channel Star One, called The Chosen One.

While working on a coffee campaign for Nescafe, Vinil met Karan Johar, who produced his first feature film. It was named Hasee Toh Phasee and was released in 2014. It starred Parineeti Chopra and Sidharth Malhotra and is about the romance between a struggling businessman and a drug-abusing scientist. Vinil said that his advertisement background helped him direct the movie. David Chute of Variety summarised that "This debut feature by Vinil Mathew, a director of stylish TV commercials, is simply too well made and too enjoyable". A review from India Today rated it with 3/5 stars, stating, "Hasee Toh Phasee is a refreshing, much-needed entry in the contemporary romcom genre". The film performed moderately well commercially, earning ₹61.7 crore worldwide against a budget of ₹26 crore, becoming the eighth highest grossing Hindi film of 2014.

Keen to work in a different genre, Vinil was attracted to Kanika Dhillon's script of Haseen Dillruba, a romantic thriller about a murder involving a married woman. Starring Taapsee Pannu, the film was released on Netflix in 2021. The film received mixed reviews from critics. Ronak Kotecha of The Times of India gave it 3.5 stars out of 5 and called it "a delectably dark and defiant love story with a thrilling twist". Stutee Ghosh of The Quint praised "Vinil Mathew ‘s directorial flourishes" and added that "the only way Haseen Dillruba truly works is if we unequivocally surrender to its pulpy universe". It emerged as the most-watched Hindi film on Netflix in 2021, reaching top 10 in 22 different countries.

== Filmography ==
- The Chosen One (2003)
- Hasee Toh Phasee (2014)
- Haseen Dillruba (2021)
- Kaala (2023)
