= Ghar Ki Baat Hai =

- Written by: Kanika Dhillon; Rahul Patel; Varun Grover
- Directed by: Anant Mahadevan
- Creative director: Aziz Mirza
- Starring: See Below
- Composers: Pritam; Raju Singh
- Country of origin: India
- Original language: Hindi

Production
- Running time: 24 minutes
- Production company: Red Chillies Idiot Box

Original release
- Network: NDTV Imagine
- Release: 30 January – 4 July 2009

Ghar Ki Baat Hai (transl. Home Matters) is an Indian Hindi television sitcom on NDTV Imagine in 2009.

== Cast ==
- Ali Asgar as various characters
- Sumeet Raghavan as Rajdeep Yagnik
- Juhi Babbar as Radhika Yagnik
- Swapnil Joshi as Kapil Kumar
- Malini Naalappa as Malini
- Deven Munjal as Bhupinder Ahluwalia
- Jay Thakkar as Happy Singh Ahluwalia
- Jayati Bhatia as Dolly Ahluwalia

=== Guests ===
- Juhi Chawla
- Shreyas Talpade
- Farah Khan
- Irfan Khan
