= Gandhari (2026 film) =

2026 Indian action thriller film

- Official release poster
- Directed by: Devashish Makhija
- Written by: Kanika Dhillon
- Produced by: Kanika Dhillon
- Starring: Taapsee Pannu; Ishwak Singh; Chhaya Kadam; Swastika Mukherjee; Mita Vashisht
- Cinematography: Amit Roy
- Edited by: Rajesh Pandey
- Music by: Sher Police; Clinton Cerejo; Bianca Gomes
- Production company: Kathha Pictures
- Distributed by: Netflix
- Release date: 3 September 2026
- Running time: 117 minutes
- Country: India
- Language: Hindi

Gandhari is a 2026 Indian Hindi-language action thriller film directed by Devashish Makhija and written and produced by Kanika Dhillon. It stars Taapsee Pannu, Ishwak Singh, Chhaya Kadam, Swastika Mukherjee and Mita Vashisht.

The film premiered on Netflix on 3 September 2026. Gandhari has emerged as one of the most successful Indian film performances on Netflix in 2026, with the latest data putting Taapsee Pannu's action thriller solidly among the platform's most watched Indian films of the year.

== Synopsis ==
A married couple lose their young daughter in a busy train station at Joypurra and as the mother runs after the kidnapper, a violent attack leaves her unable to see for a while. They reach the Joypurra police station and file a complaint for their missing daughter. It is discovered that a sex trafficking gang called ‘The Blackhole’ operates out of Joypurra and is kidnapping young girls from adjacent areas to send a consignment of girls abroad in a month’s time.

As the mother struggles with fear and grief, she pushes through her pain and faces a hidden network of child traffickers operating inside a strange Joypurra filled with behrupiyas and old legends. To rescue her daughter and the other missing children before they vanish forever, she transforms into a powerful, almost mythical force of revenge.

== Cast ==
- Taapsee Pannu as Bani
- Ishwak Singh as Gokul
- Chhaya Kadam as Uma Didi
- Swastika Mukherjee as Churni Didi
- Mita Vashisht as Jhunu Amba
- Jatin Sarna as Kabir
- Prashant Narayanan as Dada
- Chandan Roy as Somesh
- Vishwanath Chatterjee as Inspector Saha
- Priti Shroff as ASI Sanjukta
- Myrah Shivan as Mishty
- Subham Basu as Suspicious Man

== Production ==
The project was announced on 10 September 2024 by Netflix with Kanika Dhillon as writer and producer. Taapsee Pannu was selected to play mother in the action-thriller film. On 30 September 2024, it was reported that Taapsee Pannu prepared for action scenes as per the demand of her character in the film.

Principal photography began on 18 December 2024, Taapsee Pannu posted images from the first day of her shoot on her instagram account. Filming was wrapped up on 17 March 2025, after 50 days of location shoot in and around Mumbai and Maharashtra.

== Music ==
The film's music is composed by Shor Police, Clinton Cerejo and Bianca Gomes. All songs are penned by Kausar Munir.

== Release ==
Gandhari is available to stream on Netflix from 3 September 2026 In Hindi, Tamil, Telugu, English.

== Reception ==
On the review aggregator website Rotten Tomatoes, 17% of 18 critics' reviews are positive, with an average rating of 4.5/10.

Tanisha Bhattacharya of NDTV rated it 3/5 stars and writes that "Gandhari makes for a decent one-time watch. At times, it seems convoluted, with sudden flashes of traditional impressionist behrupia performances, even as the director links them to the storytelling and the film's underlying message." Renuka Vyavahare of The Times of India gave 2.5 stars out of 5 and said that the film "unfolds like a 90s-style drama in search of a contemporary voice. It gets lost in its own ambitions, desperately trying to be everything at once." Suchin Mehrotra writing for The Quint stated that "Gandhari is a tonal mess that’s lost between gritty crime thriller and heightened action flick."

Sukanya Verma of Rediff.com gave 2 stars out of 5 and said that "All of Gandhari's attempts to shroud itself in mystery are laughable." Devesh Sharma of Filmfare rated it 2/5 stars and said that "Gandhari is a mystery which has too many strands. It’s a mishmash of mythology, folklore, investigation, social message and women empowerment." Nandini Ramnath of Scroll.in writes in her review that "After a bustling beginning, Gandhari lapses into a kind of nervous languidity. the Netflix release tries to draw juice from low-hanging fruit – child sex trafficking is one of the most unconscionable crimes – but comes up empty."
