= Kaun Pravin Tambe? =

2022 Indian Hindi filme

- Official release poster
- Directed by: Jayprad Desai
- Written by: Kiran Yadnyopavit
- Produced by: Shital Bhatia; Sudip Tewari
- Starring: Shreyas Talpade; Ashish Vidyarthi; Parambrata Chatterjee; Anjali Patil
- Cinematography: Sudheer Palsane
- Edited by: Ghorakshnath Khande
- Music by: Sai-Piyush
- Production companies: Fox Star Studios; Friday Filmworks; Bootroom Sports
- Distributed by: Disney+ Hotstar
- Release date: 1 April 2022
- Running time: 134 minutes
- Country: India
- Language: Hindi

Kaun Pravin Tambe? (transl. Who is Pravin Tambe?) is a 2022 Indian Hindi-language biographical sports drama film directed by Jayprad Desai. It is based on the life of Indian cricketer Pravin Tambe. The film stars Shreyas Talpade and premiered on Disney+ Hotstar on 1 April 2022.

This was the last film to be released under the Fox Star Studios name before being rebranded to Star Studios on 27 May 2022.

== Cast ==
- Shreyas Talpade as Pravin Tambe
- Ashish Vidyarthi as Vidyadhar (Vidya) Paradkar, Coach of Orient Shipping Associates
- Parambrata Chatterjee as Rajat Sanyal, a sports journalist from Pioneer News Media Networks Pvt Ltd. & Author
- Anjali Patil as Vaishali Tambe, Pravin's wife
- Shekar Betkar as Bandu
- Aditi Patil as Deepa Tambe
- Nyshita Bajaj as Pari Tambe
- Chhaya Kadam as Jyoti Tambe, Pravin's mother
- Arun Nalawade as Vijay Tambe, Pravin's father
- Nitin Rao as Abey Kuruvilla
- Chirag Trivedi as Rahul Dravid
- Prasad Oak as Vijay Patil
- Ajinkya Date as Jatin
- Gaurav Kamble as Shyam
- Asif Ali as Journalist Kishore
- Vedant Mishra as Vikas
- Ankur Dabas as Ajay Kadam (Captain of Orient Shipping Associates)
- Jagdish Chavan as Jagdish

== Soundtrack ==
Music composed by Anurag Saikia.

| No. | Title | Lyrics | Music | Singer(s) | Length |
|---|---|---|---|---|---|
| 1. | "Khamakha" | Shakeel Azmi | Anurag Saikia | Vivek Hariharan, Anurag Saikia | 2:46 |
| Total length: | | | | | 2:46 |

== Release ==
The film premiered on Disney+ Hotstar on 1 April 2022, in Hindi also dubbed in Tamil as Yaar Pravin Tambe? and Telugu as Pravin Tambe Evaru?.

== Reception ==
Devesh Sharma of Filmfare rated the film 4 out of 5 stars and wrote "Director Jayprad Desai has given us a pulsating human drama in the guise of a sports biopic". Pallabi Dey Purkayastha of The Times of India rated the film 3.5 out of 5 stars and wrote "Unless you are venturing into the sports biopic genre with 'Kaun Pravin Tambe?'—let's be honest here—it will not leave you stupefied." Saibal Chatterjee of NDTV rated the film 3 out of 5 stars and wrote "It pieces together a fascinating life story that is much more about dour tenacity than about flashy achievements and staggering statistics". Anna M. M. Vetticad of Firstpost rated the film 3 out of 5 stars and wrote "Few Indian actors are as qualified to take on Pravin Tambe's biopic as the Hindi-Marathi star Shreyas Talpade who first attracted the national spotlight playing a deaf-mute cricketer in Nagesh Kukunoor's 2005 film Iqbal. Rohan Naahar of Indian Express rated the film 2 out of 5 stars and wrote "Shreyas Talpade delivers an earnest performance in Hotstar's unmemorable cricket biopic, which feels like reading a dozen editions of the Wisden almanac back-to-back".
