= Nagrik =

- Film Poster
- Directed by: Jaypraad Desai
- Screenplay by: Mahesh Keluskar; Jaypraad Desai
- Produced by: Arti Sachin Chavan
- Starring: Dr Shriram Lagoo; Dilip Prabhavalkar; Sachin Khedekar; Sulabha Deshpande; Neena Kulkarni; Devika Daftardar; Rajesh Sharma; Milind Soman
- Cinematography: Devendra Golatkar
- Edited by: Gorakshnath
- Music by: Tuby-Parik; Sambhaji Bhagat
- Production companies: Sacchi Entertainment & Ronak Bandelkar
- Distributed by: Om Rajat Enterprises
- Release date: 12 June 2015
- Running time: 122 minutes
- Country: India
- Language: Marathi

Nagrik is a 2015 Indian Marathi language mystery political film, directed by Jayprad Desai and produced by Arti Sachin Chavan and co-produced by Dr.Sunil Chavan presented by Sachhi Entertainment and Ronak Bandelkar. The film is released on 12 June 2015.

== Plot ==
Nagrik is set against the political backdrop of Maharashtra. Shyam Jagdale, the chief political correspondent of a leading Marathi daily called 'Aaj Mumbai' does an important exposé in his political column 'Nagrik'. This triggers off a series of events that uncovers the unholy nexus between politics, business and the media. Plans of Vikas Patil, the new rising star on the political horizon, are thwarted. Shyam becomes suspicious at the turn of events and smells a bigger conspiracy. But treading the path of truth has never been easy or forgiving.

== Cast ==
- Dr Shriram Lagoo
- Dilip Prabhavalkar
- Sachin Khedekar
- Sulabha Deshpande
- Neena Kulkarni
- Devika Daftardar
- Rajesh Sharma
- Milind Soman
- Rajkumar Tangde

== Critical response ==
Ganesh Matkari of Pune Mirror wrote "Success, I believe, is not all that matters, sometimes it is enough to see that you have given it all you’ve got". Mihir Bhanage of The Times of India gave the film 3.5 stars out of 5 and wrote "We rarely see a film that has a strong balance of good content and technical acumen. Nagrik is one of those rare one. Do give it a watch".
