= Phir Aayi Hasseen Dillruba =

2024 Indian film by Jayprad Desai

- Official release poster
- Directed by: Jayprad Desai
- Written by: Kanika Dhillon
- Produced by: Aanand L. Rai; Himanshu Sharma; Bhushan Kumar; Krishan Kumar
- Starring: Taapsee Pannu; Vikrant Massey; Sunny Kaushal
- Cinematography: Vishal Sinha
- Edited by: Hemal Kothari
- Music by: Sachet–Parampara; Anurag Saikia
- Production companies: Colour Yellow Productions; T-Series Films
- Distributed by: Netflix
- Release date: 9 August 2024
- Running time: 133 minutes
- Country: India
- Language: Hindi

Phir Aayi Hasseen Dillruba (transl. 'Beautiful beloved is back') is a 2024 Indian Hindi-language romantic thriller film directed by Jayprad Desai and written by Kanika Dhillon. Produced by Colour Yellow Productions and T-Series Films. A sequel to the 2021 film Haseen Dillruba, it stars Taapsee Pannu, Vikrant Massey and Sunny Kaushal. The film premiered on Netflix on 9 August 2024.

== Plot ==
Five years after the events of Haseen Dillruba, Rani is living in Agra, running a beauty parlour, while Rishu, now using the alias Ravi, works as a delivery boy and has a prosthetic hand. Though living separately to avoid detection, they stay in touch by phone and plan to escape to Thailand. Abhimanyu, Rani's landlady's physician, has shown romantic interest in her, which she doesn't reciprocate, while Rishu's landlady, Poonam, has made explicit advances towards him, which he also rejects.

A.C.P Kishore Rawat and Senior Inspector Manav Shukla, now in Agra, visit Rani and reveal they know she and Rishu are responsible for Neel's murder, having read the book that inspired their cover-up. Mritunjay "Monty" Paswan, Neel's uncle, is leading the investigation and is determined to prove Rani and Rishu's guilt. Monty quickly captures Rishu's travel agent, foiling their escape plans. Panicked, Rani decides to marry Abhimanyu to divert suspicion, to which Rishu begrudgingly agrees. Rani proposes to Abhimanyu, but only on the condition that they can't fall in love. Despite his shock, he accepts, and the two get married.

Rani and Abhimanyu maintain a platonic relationship after their wedding. Abhimanyu, who lost his parents, and later his uncle and aunt at a young age, reveals that his love for Rani kept him from ending his life. One night, a drunk Rani accidentally reveals the truth about using their marriage to hide Rishu's existence. Wanting Rani to be happy, Abhimanyu agrees to help them escape and hides Rishu in his clinic. Abhimanyu later confesses to Rishu that he killed his uncle and aunt, and their two children, as revenge for cheating his father out of his business. Frightened, Rishu attacks Abhimanyu, who locks him in, but Rishu eventually escapes.

The night before Rani and Rishu's planned escape, Abhimanyu reveals his psychopathic tendencies to Rani and attacks her. She flees to the police for help. Shortly after, a burning van with two charred bodies is found, identified primarily as Poonam and Abhimanyu, leading to Rani's arrest. To draw Rishu out, the police publicise Rani's mistreatment in custody. Rishu agrees to surrender if they release Rani at a railway bridge, allowing them a final moment together. Monty agrees. At the bridge, surrounded by police, as Rishu and Rani reconcile, a police officer approaches, and is revealed to be Abhimanyu in disguise. After a brief struggle, all three fall into the crocodile-infested river below. No bodies are found, and they are presumed dead.

Monty, however, continues investigating and discovers that Lallan is an associate of Abhimanyu, and Poonam visited Rishu the day Abhimanyu hid him, suggesting that Abhimanyu's body might be Lallan's. Rishu entered Rani and Abhimanyu's house the night Rani turned herself in, with Rani leaving for the police station two hours later. Monty concludes that the events at the bridge were orchestrated. Flashbacks reveal that after Rishu arrives at Abhimanyu's house, the three decide to work together to evade the police. Abhimanyu kills Poonam and Lallan as they are key witnesses and uses it as an opportunity to fake his death. They then used Rishu's demand to surrender at the bridge to stage their escape. Unbeknownst to Rani, Abhimanyu removed Rishu's prosthetic arm underwater during their escape, rendering him unable to swim and leaving him to be attacked by a crocodile. Rani and Abhimanyu make it out of the river alive. Rishu is presumed dead, leaving Rani heartbroken.

Six months later, Rani and Abhimanyu live in the village of Deosar. Rani is a teacher while Abhimanyu runs a clinic. In letters, Rani invites Abhimanyu and Monty to a cliffside. Confronting Abhimanyu, she reveals that she knows he killed Rishu to remove him from her life, before jumping off the cliff into the river below. Monty then arrests Abhimanyu. In a final twist, flashbacks reveal that Rishu survived the crocodile attack, later reuniting with Rani and telling her the truth. Rani survives her fall and escapes with Rishu. It is also revealed that Abhimanyu is actually Dinesh Pandit's son.

== Cast ==
- Taapsee Pannu as Rani Kashyap
- Vikrant Massey as Rishabh "Rishu" Saxena / Ravi
- Sunny Kaushal as Abhimanyu Pandit
- Jimmy Sheirgill as Mrityunjay Tripathi aka Monty Chacha
- Aditya Srivastava as A.C.P Kishore Rawat, Manav's senior officer
- Saanand Verma as Senior Inspector Manav Shukla, Kishore's junior officer
- Trupti Khamkar as Meena Kumari
- Manoj Kumar Singh as Arafat Ansari
- Alok Kumar Pandey as Chriraunjilal Chaurasia
- Manwendra Kumar Tripathy as Sharad Pathak
- Bhumika Dube as Poonam Bharadwaj
- Gautam Shanathappa Gadaballi as Lallan
- Sahela Raza as Afsana
- Ambrish Kumar Saxena as Mr. Rajesh Khanna
- Sapana Paritosh Sand as Mrs. Leela Khanna
- Pramod Rana as Travel Agent

== Production ==
The film was announced in January 2023. Taapsee Pannu and Vikrant Massey reprise their roles from the previous film, with Sunny Kaushal joining the cast. The principal photography of the film started in mid-January 2023. The filming was wrapped up in December 2023. The teaser was released on 1 March 2024, followed by the trailer on 25 July 2024.

== Soundtrack ==
Phir Aayi Hasseen Dillruba

Soundtrack album by Sachet-Parampara and Anurag Saikia
- Released: 7 August 2024
- Recorded: 2023
- Genre: Feature film soundtrack
- Length: 10:06
- Language: Hindi
- Label: T-Series
External audio
- Phir Aayi Hasseen Dillruba Jukebox on YouTube

The music of the film is composed by Sachet-Parampara and Anurag Saikia with lyrics written by Raj Shekhar and Kumaar. The first single titled "Haste Haste" was released on 31 July 2024. The second single titled "Kya Haal Hai" was released on 5 August 2024.

Track listing
No.	Title	Lyrics	Music	Singer(s)	Length
1.	"Haste Haste"	Raj Shekhar	Sachet-Parampara	Sachet Tandon	3:20
2.	"Kya Haal Hai"	Kumaar	Sachet-Parampara	Sachet Tandon, Parampara Thakur	3:59
3.	"Azaad"	Raj Shekhar	Anurag Saikia	Anurag Saikia, Vivek Hariharan	2:47
Total length:					10:06

== Reception ==
On the review aggregator website Rotten Tomatoes, 38% of 16 critics' reviews are positive, with an average rating of 5.5/10. The film wasn't well received by audiences.

A critic for Bollywood Hungama rated the film 3 stars out of 5 and wrote "Phir Aayi Hasseen Dillruba is not as gripping as the first part but has its share of entertaining scenes and twists and turns." Shubhra Gupta of The Indian Express rated the film 3/5 stars and states "The trio of Taapsee Pannu as the scheming Rani, Vikrant Massey who valiantly stays the course for his one true love, and Sunny Kaushal as ‘mar-mitne-wala-aashiq’, are all spot on." Sukanya Verma of Rediff.com rated the film 2/5 stars and observed "Taapsee, Vikrant, Sunny are a fine fit on their own as well as around each other and prove themselves to be well equipped to survive the air of double dealing. What's missing is sizzle." Saibal Chatterjee of NDTV gave the film 2.5 stars out of five and notes "Neither the addition of Sunny Kaushal and Jimmy Shergill to the cast nor the predatory creatures that are alluded to enhance the sting in the film's tail. But, for sure, the love story is more twisted than before."

Rishabh Suri for Hindustan Times wrote, "Taapsee Pannu and Vikrant Massey film lacks originality, leaves you unsatisfied." and Anuj Kumar for The Hindu opined, "The dangers and deception that defined the 2021 dark romantic thriller feel contrived in the sequel."
