= Hasee Toh Phasee =

2014 Indian film by Vinil Mathew

- Theatrical release poster
- Directed by: Vinil Mathew
- Written by: Story and Script:- Harshavardhan Kulkarni; Dialogues: Anurag Kashyap; Purva Naresh; Vinil Matthew
- Produced by: Karan Johar; Vikas Bahl; Vikramaditya Motwane; Anurag Kashyap
- Starring: Sidharth Malhotra; Parineeti Chopra
- Cinematography: Sanu Varghese
- Edited by: Shweta Venkat Mathew
- Music by: Score: Amar Mangrulkar; Songs: Vishal–Shekhar
- Production companies: Phantom Films; Dharma Productions
- Distributed by: AA Films (India); Reliance Entertainment (Overseas)
- Release date: 7 February 2014
- Running time: 141 minutes
- Country: India
- Language: Hindi
- Budget: ₹25 crore
- Box office: ₹63.38 crore

Hasee Toh Phasee (transl. If she smiles, she is trapped) is a 2014 Indian Hindi-language romantic comedy-drama film directed by Vinil Mathew and produced by Karan Johar, Vikas Bahl, Vikramaditya Motwane and Anurag Kashyap under Dharma Productions and Phantom Films. The film stars Parineeti Chopra and Sidharth Malhotra, along with Adah Sharma, Manoj Joshi, Sharat Saxena and Neena Kulkarni.

Marking Malhotra's reunion with Dharma Productions, as well as Chopra's first project outside her Yash Raj Films collaborations, Hasee Toh Phasee follows the story of Nikhil, a struggling businessman who, believing he is in love with Karishma, an actress he is engaged to, has to prove his worth to his father-in-law while grappling with the sudden return of his fiancée's geeky sister, Meeta, who he had an encounter with years ago, throwing all of them into uncharted waters as he gets to know Meeta better. Vishal–Shekhar composed the music, while lyrics were written by Amitabh Bhattacharya and Kumaar.

The film was released on 7 February 2014. It mainly received positive reviews from critics, with praise for its story, music, humor, cinematography and cast performances, particularly Chopra's, and earned ₹63.38 crore worldwide, thus emerging as a moderate commercial success at the box office.

At the 60th Filmfare Awards, Hasee Toh Phasee received 3 nominations, including Best Lyricist (Bhattacharya for "Zehnaseeb") and Best Male Playback Singer (Shekhar Ravjiani for "Zehnaseeb").

== Plot ==
Nikhil Bhardwaj is a struggling businessman who loves Karishma Solanki, an actress. A firm old–schooler, he believes that once committed to a girl, there should be no straying, so he asks Karishma's father, Devesh, to help him with ₹50 million before marriage to earn a contract. However, Devesh sidesteps his request, thus forcing him to prove his worth on his own.

Sometime later, Nikhil meets Meeta, Karishma's younger sister, whom he had a brief encounter with seven years ago. Meeta, an IITian in Chemical Engineering and PhD, is a super-intelligent geek with unusual habits and tics. She ran away seven years ago to China via Goa, Nikhil inadvertently helping her while declining her offer to accompany, after stealing money for her project from Devesh, leading him to suffer a heart attack on the day of their eldest sister, Deeksha's wedding. Now, just a week before Nikhil and Karishma's wedding, Meeta has turned up to meet Devesh, but Karishma, fearing that Meeta's sudden appearance might ruin their wedding, assigns Nikhil to watch over Meeta and keep her away from the Solanki family.

Nikhil and Meeta become close during the seven days preceding Nikhil's wedding. He learns that Meeta has returned, intending to steal again, and has taken a hefty loan of ₹100 million from a Chinese investor for her research by forging her father's signature. The deadline for payback is over, and an extension of three days was given, during which she has to steal money from her father's account to save him from the investor's goons. Nikhil helps Meeta hack her father's account, but advises her to apologise to her family. Meeta apologizes and reunites with her family.

Meeta cannot gather the courage to steal her father's money and tells him the truth; in response, he forgives her and gives her the money. She later meets Nikhil and proposes an elopement, but unwilling to betray Karishma, he backs off. Meanwhile, Mukesh Adnani, an investor, shows his interest in Nikhil's idea, which was originally proposed by Meeta.

On the wedding day, Meeta leaves her house without informing anyone, leaving her mobile phone in Karishma's room. Nikhil tries to call her and sends many texts, which go unanswered. On reaching the wedding altar, Devesh informs Nikhil that she has left for China. Karishma finds Meeta's phone in her room, reads Nikhil's messages, and realises she has lost him. During the wedding, she asks Nikhil to leave, to which Nikhil hesitantly obliges. Heartbroken, Meeta tries to run away, but soon gathers enough courage to go back and profess her love for Nikhil. She and Nikhil reunite at the same place and in the same predicament they first met 7 years ago. They both express their love for each other and share a kiss.

The film ends with Nikhil, now an IPS officer and Meeta, at the airport, scheduled to travel to Germany. Meeta tells him that there is another problem waiting for them there, as Meeta tells Nikhil he will be safe, but Nikhil says he wants Meeta to be safe with him as well, and they have a fun banter.

== Cast ==
- Parineeti Chopra as Dr. Meeta Solanki
  - Anshikaa Shrivastava as Young Meeta
- Sidharth Malhotra as Nikhil Bharadwaj
  - Namit Shah as young Nikhil
- Adah Sharma as Karishma Solanki
- Manoj Joshi as Devesh Solanki, Meeta and Karishma's father
- Sharat Saxena as S. B. Bharadwaj, Nikhil's father
- Neena Kulkarni as Mrs. Bharadwaj, Nikhil's mother
- Sameer Sharma as Abhay Bharadwaj, Nikhil's brother
- Anil Mange as Abhinandan
- Sameer Khakhar as Alpesh Solanki, Meeta's uncle
- Sunil Upadhyay as Salim
- Garvita Sharma as Amrita
- Gulzar Dastur as Nikhil's aunt
- Lily Patel as Baa, Meeta's grandmother
- Akash Dabas as Nikhil's friend
- Jaymeet Sinha as Ruhaan
- Tinnu Anand as Mukesh Adnani (special appearance)
- Bobby Darling in a special appearance in song "Drama Queen"
- Karan Johar in a special appearance
- Vikas Bahl in a special appearance
- Madhu Mantena in a special appearance

== Production ==
=== Development ===
Karan Johar's Dharma Productions along with Anurag Kashyap, Vikramaditya Motwane and Vikas Bahl's Phantom Films, announced that they would make a romantic comedy together. The film is directed by Vinil Mathew in his directorial debut. The film was initially titled Hasta la vista Su Badam Pista. But it was later changed to Hasee Toh Phasee. Anurag Kashyap said, "The story works with fresh faces, but requires a high level of chemistry and maturity in the performances. After spending months shortlisting various actors, we finalised Sidharth Malhotra and Parineeti Chopra."

=== Casting ===
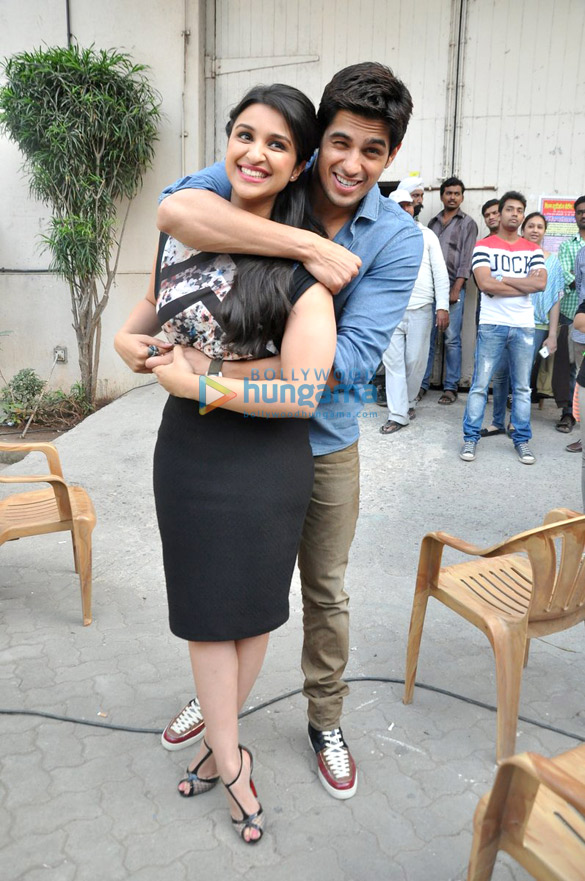
The film marked Chopra and Malhotra's first collaboration

Sidharth Malhotra was cast as the businessman Nikhil. Malhotra said tha Nikhil is not the "typical hero" but a shy, sweet and a committed guy. Parineeti Chopra was cast as the quirky scientist Meeta. Chopra said that her character was a quite "difficult one" and added that Meeta, shattered stereotypical representation of a heroine on-screen. The film marked their first project together.

Vinil Mathew stated that he wanted Chopra to have different hairstyles, to capture the seven-year period covered in the film. Mathew added that while Chopra was always on his "wish list", it was Johar who suggested Malhotra for the film. In an interview, Harshavardhan Kulkarni revealed that Meeta's character was based on his friend's intelligent brother.

Adah Sharma was cast as Karishma, Meeta's sister and the second lead, opposite Malhotra. Manoj Joshi was cast as Meeta's father, Sharat Saxena and Neena Kulkarni were cast as Nikhil's parents. Sameer Sharma, Anil Mange, Sameer Khakhar and Lily Patel played other prominent roles. Producers Karan Johar, Vikas Bahl and Madhu Mantena appeared in special appearances.

=== Filming ===
On director Mathew, Malhotra said, "It didn't feel like the first day of shoot because he is so sorted and knows exactly what he wants. He made us rehearse a lot during a two-month workshop before shooting began". The fact that Adah Sharma was involved in the cast was supposed to be kept a secret before official announcement. But, it was later revealed as Adah was seen shooting at the Bandra Bandstand Promenade.

Filming began on 18 April 2013. The film was shot in and out Mumbai including, places such as Lokhandwala and Marine Drive. Chopra was also injured, while shooting for the film. Malhotra completed shooting for the film in September 2013.

=== Post-production ===
During the post-production phase, Hasee Toh Phasee was promoted in a unique way. The makers of the film created a web application through which people across the country will try to make Chopra laugh under her co-star Malhotra's guidance. It was made to make people "experience the essence" of the film online.

== Soundtrack ==
Hasee Toh Phasee

Soundtrack album by Vishal–Shekhar
- Released: 23 December 2013
- Genre: Feature film soundtrack
- Length: 22:59
- Language: Hindi
- Label: Sony Music
- Producer: Karan Johar

Vishal–Shekhar chronology
Gori Tere Pyaar Mein (2013)	Hasee Toh Phasee (2013)	Happy New Year (2014)

Singles from Hasee Toh Phasee
- 1. "Drama Queen" Released: 23 December 2013; 2. "Zehnaseeb" Released: 3 January 2014

Shankar–Ehsaan–Loy were initially signed on as composers for the film. But eventually they opted out, and songs featured in the film were composed by Vishal–Shekhar, while the lyrics are written by Amitabh Bhattacharya, except for "Ishq Bulaava", which is written by Kumaar. The first single "Drama Queen", sung by Shreya Ghoshal and Vishal Dadlani, was launched on 23 December 2013. The song "Zehnaseeb", sung by Chinmayi Sripaada along with Shekhar Ravjiani, was launched on 3 January 2014.

There are six original tracks and a remix track in the album. The complete soundtrack album was released on 6 January 2014. The remix version of "Drama Queen" was later uploaded as a single on the official YouTube channel of Dharma Productions. A Gujarati rap song was entirely written and composed by Khamosh Shah, which is there in the film but not on the soundtrack. The "Punjabi Wedding Song" was choreographed by Karishma Chavan.

Hasee Toh Phasee (Original Motion Picture Soundtrack)
No.	Title	Singer(s)	Length
1.	"Punjabi Wedding Song"	Sunidhi Chauhan, Benny Dayal	03:53
2.	"Shake It Like Shammi"	Benny Dayal	03:26
3.	"Shaadi Mubarakam"	Javed Ali, KK, Raja Kumari, Manj Musik, Shreya Ghoshal	03:47
4.	"Zehnaseeb"	Chinmayi Sripaada, Shekhar Ravjiani	03:37
5.	"Drama Queen"	Shreya Ghoshal, Vishal Dadlani	03:18
6.	"Ishq Bulaava"	Sanam Puri, Shipra Goyal (album); Sanam Puri, Chinmayi Sripaada (film)	05:03
Total length:			22:59

=== Critical reception ===
The music of the film received mixed to positive reviews from critics. Joginder Tuteja of Rediff.com termed "Ishq Bulava" the best love song and noted, "The music of Hasee Toh Phasee delivers more than it promised at the outset. One expected just a fun-filled score, but Vishal-Shekhar have gone beyond that to bring us some soulful melodies as well." Seema Sinha of Times of India stated, "The music of the film also seems to be refreshing, with a nice blend of foot-tapping dance numbers and romantic ballads."

NDTV noted, "The musical duo Vishal-Shekhar have ensured the songs capture the right essence to mesmerise the young crowd. All in all, the songs of Hasse Toh Phasee are youthful, peppy, entertaining and enthralling." Bollywood Hungama liked the songs "Manchala" and "Zehnaseeb", but added, "Vishal-Shekhar have done better than in some recent soundtracks, they should get more serious about their do's (strength and freshness in compositions) and don'ts (poor mixing and over-orchestration)."

=== Charts and ranks ===
Zehnaseeb became the most popular song of the album. It was placed fifth in the list of "Bollywood music report Jan – Sept 2014", by The Times of India. The song was also placed tenth in Radio Mirchi's list of "Top 20 songs of 2014".

== Release ==
Hasee Toh Phasee's first look and poster was released in December 2013. The film's trailer was released in the same month. It was theatrically released on 7 February 2014. Hasee Toh Phasee was later made available on Netflix and Amazon Prime Video.

== Reception ==
=== Critical reception ===
Hasee Toh Phasee received positive reviews from critics, with particular praises directed towards the lead cast performances, direction and story.

Meena Iyer of The Times of India gave it 3.5/5 stars, stating, "Hasee Toh Phasee is for the romantics who like their martinis stirred not shaken. This romantic comedy mirrors the quirks in human nature subtly and provides humour in everyday situations; in the family and amongst friends. If you're looking to rediscover the magic of goofy love around Valentines, give HTP a shot." Taran Adarsh of Bollywood Hungama gave it 3.5/5 stars and said, "Hasee Toh Phasee dares to be distinctive. This one's *not* merely about opposites falling in love. This one's a quirky love tale involving two individuals, shades different from the mundane stuff on matters of heart". Sukanya Verma of Rediff with the same ratings wrote, "Hasee Toh Phasee is that rare film that allows you to know the two people you're investing in. And the closer you get, the more they win you over. Parineeti sinks her teeth into this misunderstood kook without a trace of self-consciousness or exaggeration. If that's not magical enough, what Hasee Toh Phasee celebrates certainly is. That the only high you need is life, love and smiles."

Mohar Basu of Koimoi gave it 3/5 stars and wrote, "The film is both pleasantly surprising and utterly baffling in equal amounts. Hasee Toh Phasee will definitely win your heart for the symbiotically arranged, pitch perfect chemistry of Parineeti Chopra and Sidharth Malhotra. It was passionate and compelling, almost to make me wish that they were a real life couple and that alone becomes the winning shot." A review from India Today rated it with 3/5 stars, stating, "Hasee Toh Phasee is a refreshing, much-needed entry in the contemporary romcom genre, which has lately seen a series of uninspiring films. It's largely to do with the presence of an unseen pairing with great chemistry - Parineeti Chopra and Sidharth Malhotra - and Mathew and writer Harshvardhan Kulkarni's perky take on love."

Tushar Joshi of Daily News and Analysis gave the movie with 3/5 stars, writing, "The lead pair of Chopra and Malhotra make Hasee Toh Phasee enjoyable and believable. This odd pairing works only because these two actors take an effort to play their characters with utmost sincerity. Watch it if you want to see a different take on modern day romance. Hasee Toh Phasee is worth a watch for a solid act put together by its lead pair.".

=== Box office ===
According to Box Office India, Hasee Toh Phasee had a reasonable start in major metros in most parts of the country. Hasee Toh Phasee grossed around ₹40 million (US$420,000) on its first day. The movie showed a 35% growth on Saturday, earning about ₹55 million (US$570,000). The weekend collections (according to Box Office India) were approximately ₹170 million (US$1.8 million), while trade analyst Taran Adarsh claimed it to be ₹185 million (US$1.9 million). The movie grossed a decent ₹275 million (US$2.9 million) in the first week.

In the second week, the movie's screen count fell due to the release of Yash Raj Films' Gunday. However, it still grossed a figure of ₹47.5 million (US$490,000), taking the 10-day total to ₹320 million (US$3.3 million). Overseas, the opening weekend gross of film was approx $1.027 million (₹ 64.1 million).

== Accolades ==
Award	Date of ceremony (Note: Date is linked to the article about the awards held that year, wherever possible.)	Category	Recipients	Result	Ref(s)
BIG Star Entertainment Awards	18 December 2014	Most Entertaining Comedy Film	Hasee Toh Phasee	Nominated	
BIG Star Entertainment Awards	18 December 2014	Most Entertaining Romantic Film	Hasee Toh Phasee	Nominated	
BIG Star Entertainment Awards	18 December 2014	Most Entertaining Actor in a Romantic Film - Male	Sidharth Malhotra	Won	
BIG Star Entertainment Awards	18 December 2014	Most Entertaining Actor in a Comedy Film - Female	Parineeti Chopra	Won	
BIG Star Entertainment Awards	18 December 2014	Most Entertaining Actor in a Romantic Film - Female	Parineeti Chopra	Nominated	
Filmfare Awards	31 January 2015	Best Lyricist	Amitabh Bhattacharya for "Zehnaseeb"	Nominated	
Filmfare Awards	31 January 2015	Best Male Playback Singer	Shekhar Ravjiani for "Zehnaseeb"	Nominated	
Filmfare Awards	31 January 2015	Best Dialogue	Anurag Kashyap, Purva Naresh, Harshvardhan Kulkarni, Vinil Mathew	Nominated	
Global Indian Music Academy Awards	24 February 2015	Best Duet	Shekhar Ravjiani & Chinmayi Sripaada for "Zehnaseeb"	Nominated	
Mirchi Music Awards	27 February 2015	Song of The Year	"Zehnaseeb"	Won	
Mirchi Music Awards	27 February 2015	Female Vocalist of The Year	Chinmayi Sripaada for "Zehnaseeb"	Nominated	
Screen Awards	14 January 2015	Best Actress	Parineeti Chopra	Nominated	
Screen Awards	14 January 2015	Best Actress (Popular Choice)	Parineeti Chopra	Nominated	
Screen Awards	14 January 2015	Best Lyricist	Amitabh Bhattacharya for "Zehnaseeb"	Nominated	
Star Guild Awards (Note: Also known as Apsara Film & Television Producers Guild Awards.)	12 January 2015	Best Debut Director	Vinil Mathew	Nominated	
Star Guild Awards	12 January 2015	Best Actor in a Comic Role	Parineeti Chopra	Nominated	
Stardust Awards	15 December 2014	Star of the Year - Female	Parineeti Chopra	Nominated	
Stardust Awards	15 December 2014	Best Actress in a Comedy or Romance	Parineeti Chopra	Nominated	

== Legacy ==
Hasee Toh Phasee remains one of the most popular romantic dramas in Hindi cinema. It was named as one of the Bollywood's top romantic films by Rediff.com and Film Companion. Hasee Toh Phasee is cited as a milestone in Chopra and Malhotra's career. While, it was Malhotra's first solo success, it was Chopra's fourth consecutive success. Their performance in the film, has been noted as one of their most notable works.

Vibha Maru from The Indian Express noted, "What makes Hasee Toh Phasee unique is the character arc of its two leads. Each moment is made touching, especially when paired with Vishal–Shekhar’s timeless music." Chopra's character Meeta has been noted for being a different female lead in Bollywood with Chopra adding, "Hasee Toh Phasee is a very special film in my filmography. Meeta’s character is very close to my heart as I got to play the role of a quirky scientist in the film! She was the dark horse in her family and she is extremely sharp and has many ideas happening in her head all the time. I feel Meeta, in a way, broke the stereotype of how a heroine should be or look on-screen." Rediff.com, Pinkvilla, Film Companion and Cosmopolitan have named Meeta among the strongest and inspirational female characters of Bollywood.

== See also ==
- List of highest-grossing Bollywood films
- List of Hindi films of 2014
