= Kanika Dhillon =

Indian author and screenwriter

- Born: Amritsar, Punjab, India
- Education: St. Stephen's College; London School of Economics
- Occupations: Producer; Author; screenwriter
- Spouses: Prakash Kovelamudi (m. 2014; div. 2017) Himanshu Sharma (m. 2021)

Kanika Dhillon is an Indian producer, author and screenwriter known for her significant contributions in the Indian entertainment industry. While her writing journey began with the best selling novel, Bombay Duck is a Fish (2011), which was launched by Shah Rukh Khan; she followed with two successive and acclaimed novels soon after, Shiva and the Rise of the Shadows (2013), and the drama The Dance of Durga (2016).

It was in 2018, with romantic drama Manmarziyaan (2018), that Kanika gained widespread recognition as a screenwriter. She followed it up with films like Kedarnath (2018), Judgementall Hai Kya (2019), Guilty (2020), Haseen Dillruba (2021), Rashmi Rocket (2021) and Raksha Bandhan (2022)

In 2023, Dhillon transitioned into the role of a producer, by founding her production house, Kathha Pictures. The first film under her banner was the Netflix original Do Patti, which is also written by Dhillon. It went on to become the most watched streaming original of the year 2024, across all platforms and languages in India. It also made it to Variety’s Top Ten list of Most Watched Streaming Originals in the world. As per Ormax reports, Do Patti also featured in the top 10 list of the Most Liked Films of 2024.

The film was nominated for several awards under the categories including Best Film, Best Story, and Best Actor. Dhillon went on to win the IIFA 2025 Digital Award for ‘Best Story’ for Do Patti.

== Life and career ==
Kanika Dhillon was born in Amritsar, and after completing her undergraduate education from St. Stephen's College, Delhi, she pursued a master's degree at the London School of Economics. Soon after graduating, she relocated to Mumbai and worked as a script supervisor for Shah Rukh Khan's production company Red Chillies Entertainment. She went on to serve as an assistant director for the company's 2007 film Om Shanti Om. After working as a script supervisor for another one of the company's production, the comedy-drama Billu (2009), Dhillon went on to write for two television series, the NDTV Imagine sitcom Ghar Ki Baat Hai (2009) and the Disney India children's show Ishaan: Sapno Ko Awaaz De (2010–2011).

In 2011, Dhillon published her first novel, the satire Bombay Duck is a Fish, about Neki Brar, a girl aspiring for a career in Hindi films. The book was launched by Shah Rukh Khan. Reviewing the book for Daily News and Analysis, Rupa Gulab found it to be "a racy and witty lowdown on peer politics, star egos, sleaze, love rats, spot boys, junior artistes, ‘gora’ extras, etc." Rashi Tiwari of News18 commented that the book "is written with a light touch but nevertheless strikes a chord with not just Bollywood aspirants but also those looking for a fantastical getaway." Also that year, she served as a screenwriter for the superhero film Ra.One, directed by Anubhav Sinha and starring Khan.

For her prime accomplishments, Hindustan Times honoured Dhillon in 2012 at their annual youth summit "Top 30 Under 30". Following Ra.One, Dhillon was keen to write a superhero novel aimed at teenagers. Inspired by the doomsday theories of 2012, she released her next book, Shiva & The Rise of The Shadows in 2013. In 2015, she served as the writer for the Telugu–Tamil bilingual comedy Size Zero, which starred Anushka Shetty as an overweight woman who admits herself to a weight loss clinic. Initially written for Hindi film, it was eventually made in South India after Dhillon's husband, the filmmaker Prakash Kovelamudi, liked the script and directed it himself.

Dhillon's third novel, The Dance of Durga, was released in 2016. It tells the story of Rajjo, a naive young woman who transforms into a Godwoman. In a review for Hindustan Times, Khushboo Shukla labelled the book "gripping" and commended Dhillon for successfully exploring faith and culture of rural India. Deepa Suryanarayan of Femina praised the complex character of Rajjo and wrote that despite the character's misdeeds, she had empathised with Rajjo.

Dhillon has written the scripts for the 2018 Hindi films —Anurag Kashyap's drama Manmarziyaan, starring Abhishek Bachchan, Taapsee Pannu, and Vicky Kaushal; and Abhishek Kapoor's romance Kedarnath, starring Sushant Singh Rajput and Sara Ali Khan.

She has also written the script of her husband's satire on mental illness, Judgemental Hai Kya, starring Kangana Ranaut and Rajkummar Rao. During promotion of Judgemental Hai Kya, director Prakash Kovelamudi and Kanika announced their separation and said they had already separated two years earlier.

== Controversy ==
In response to allegedly "Hinduphobic" tweets, Hindutva activists started a Twitter campaign to boycott the film Raksha Bandhan (2022), which Dhillon wrote the screenplay for, the campaign was against her past tweets where she had promoted anti-Hindu conspiracy theories like "Saffron Terror" and mocked the Modi government (some tweets contained offensive references to gomutra); these tweets were later deleted.

== Personal life ==
Kanika married her first husband, director Prakash Kovelamudi, in 2014 and divorced him in 2017. In January 2021, Kanika married Himanshu Sharma.

== Bibliography ==
- Bombay Duck is a Fish (2011)
- Shiva and the Rise of the Shadows (2013)
- The Dance of Durga (2016)

== Filmography ==
=== Film ===
Year	Film	Credit	Notes
2007	Om Shanti Om	Assistant director	
2009	Billu	Script supervisor	
2011	Always Kabhi Kabhi	Additional screenplay	
2011	Ra.One	Screenplay and dialogues	
2015	Size Zero	Screenplay	Telugu–Tamil bilingual film
2018	Manmarziyaan	Story, screenplay, and dialogues	
2018	Kedarnath	Story, screenplay, and dialogues	
2019	Judgementall Hai Kya	Story, screenplay, and dialogues	
2020	Guilty	Story, screenplay, and dialogues	Netflix release
2021	Haseen Dillruba	Story, screenplay, and dialogues	Netflix release
2021	Rashmi Rocket	Screenplay and dialogues	ZEE5 release
2022	Ek Villain Returns	Story	
2022	Raksha Bandhan	Story	
2023	Dunki	Story	
2024	Phir Aayi Hasseen Dillruba	Story	Netflix release
2024	Do Patti	Story, screenplay, and dialogues	Netflix release
2026	Gandhari	Producer, writer	Netflix release

=== Television ===
- Ghar Ki Baat Hai (2009)
- Ishaan: Sapno Ko Awaaz De (2010–2011)
