= Pravin Tambe =

Indian cricketer (born 1971)

Personal information
- Full name: Pravin Vijay Tambe
- Born: 8 October 1971 (age 55); Mumbai, Maharashtra, India
- Nickname: PT
- Height: 5 ft 5 in (1.65 m)
- Batting: Right-handed
- Bowling: Right arm leg break
- Role: Bowler

Domestic team information
- Years: Team
- 2013–2015: Rajasthan Royals (squad no. 2)
- 2013/14–2016/17: Mumbai
- 2016: Gujarat Lions
- 2020: Trinbago Knight Riders

Career statistics
Competition	FC	LA	T20
Matches	2	6	64
Runs scored	60	34	38
Batting average	20	34.00	9.50
100s/50s	0/0	0/0	0/0
Top score	42	15*	14*
Balls bowled	348	288	1,356
Wickets	2	5	70
Bowling average	115.00	40.00	22.35
5 wickets in innings	0	0	0
10 wickets in match	0	0	0
Best bowling	2/127	4/2/26	4/15
Catches/stumpings	2/–	0/–	12/–
- Source: ESPNcricinfo, 3 April 2023

Pravin Vijay Tambe (born 8 October 1971) is an Indian former cricketer. Tambe, a right-arm leg spin bowler, made his Indian Premier League debut for the Rajasthan Royals at the age of 41, becoming the oldest ever IPL debutant. He had no experience playing professional cricket prior to his IPL debut.

== Personal life ==
Praveen Tambe was born in a middle class Marathi family, to father Vijay Tambe and mother Jyoti Tambe. Prashant, his elder brother, is an engineer.

He is married to Vaishali Tambe. The couple has a son named Pranav Tambe and a daughter named Pari Tambe.

== Early career ==
When Pravin was young, he wanted to be a fast bowler but it was his Orient Shipping captain Ajay Kadam who asked him to bowl as a leg spinner.

He had toiled for several years as a club level cricketer in Mumbai which he pursued as a side hustle while also holding down a day job. He started playing club cricket in the 1995–96 season with the Parsee Cyclists team in the D division of the Mumbai's domestic league. He then later switched to Parsee Gymkhana in the B division of the Mumbai's domestic league before leapfrogging to play in the top league when he joined the Shivaji Park Gymkhana. He was named in the Mumbai Ranji probables squad in between 2000 and 2002 but was not drafted in the final squad.

== Indian Premier League ==
Pravin had an unusual career for a cricketer as he had never played first-class cricket but was picked for the Indian Premier League. Rahul Dravid, his chief mentor at Rajasthan Royals had said that Praveen Tambe is an even bigger inspiration than himself. During the early seasons of the IPL (in the first five seasons from 2008 to 2012), he worked as a liaison officer for about five years especially whenever matches were conducted at the DY Patil Stadium in Navi Mumbai.

He received an IPL contract with Rajasthan Royals after being spotted by scouts during an invitational T20 tournament where he was noticed for his ability to bowl great variations of leg spin. It was initially revealed that Tambe was the coach of the B team of the DY Patil Sports Academy in their invitational T20 tournament which was held in January 2013. However, he had to step in as the first-choice bowler in place of injured Rahul Sharma and Tambe stepped up by taking 12 wickets which helped his team to win the invitational tournament. It was this performance in the invitational tournament that caught attention and helped him get an IPL contract with Rajasthan Royals. He made his professional cricket debut as well as his T20 debut playing for Rajasthan Royals against Delhi Daredevils in the 2013 Indian Premier League at the age of 41.

Former club-mate and Mumbai selector Abey Kuruvilla also revealed that Pravin has only peaked over the last 8 years, ever since he switched from bowling medium pace to leg spin. During the 2014 Indian Premier League, Pravin took a hat-trick against Kolkata Knight Riders on 5 May 2014 in Ahmedabad by dismissing Manish Pandey, Yusuf Pathan and Ryan ten Doeschate which also helped him to earn the man of the match award. He briefly held the purple cap in IPL 2014 up till the 25th match of the tournament. He ended the 2014 IPL season on a high by taking 15 wickets (he was also the leading wicket taker for Rajasthan Royals in 2014 season) although Rajasthan Royals couldn't progress to playoffs after a disastrous loss to Mumbai Indians.

In 2016, he was bought by the Gujarat Lions franchise for the 2016 Indian Premier League season. In February 2017, Pravin was bought by the Sunrisers Hyderabad team for the 2017 Indian Premier League for 10 lakhs. In the 2020 IPL auction, he was bought by the Kolkata Knight Riders ahead of the 2020 Indian Premier League. He withdrew his initial retirement decision which he made in 2018 in order to return to IPL in 2020 after being bought by KKR for 20 lakhs in the 2019 auction. However, he was disqualified by the IPL governing body to take part in 2020 IPL after playing in a T10 league without getting proper permission from relevant authorities and for breaching BCCI's policies.

== T10 Cricket League ==
In season two of the Abu Dhabi T10 League season, Pravin played for the Sindhis team. He initially announced his retirement in 2018 in order to play in the T10 league as the BCCI's rule strictly says an active Indian cricketer cannot play in a foreign league. In the fourth group phase match of the 2018 T10 League against Kerala Knights, he set a record by becoming the first player to take a 5 wicket haul in the history of the T10 format when he dismissed Chris Gayle, Eoin Morgan, Kieron Pollard, Fabian Allen and Upul Tharanga. By dismissing Morgan, Pollard and Allen in consecutive balls he became the second player after Shahid Afridi to take a hat-trick in T10 league.

== Domestic and T20 franchise career ==
He received the Golden Wicket award (for taking most wickets in the tournament) in 2013 Champions League Twenty20. He ended up taking 12 wickets in five matches with an impressive average of 6.50 which was even far better than the likes of Ravichandran Ashwin and Sunil Narine. He was also the most economical bowler for the Royals in the 2013 CLT20 final against the Mumbai Indians where he delivered a crucial spell of 2/19 in 4 overs.

Pravin received his maiden call for the Mumbai cricket team squad in the 2013–14 Ranji Trophy and made his debut in the next round against the Orissa cricket team. He made his List A debut for Mumbai in the 2016–17 Vijay Hazare Trophy on 25 February 2017.

In July 2020, Pravin was named in the Trinbago Knight Riders squad for the 2020 Caribbean Premier League (CPL). He became the first Indian cricketer to get a contract in the CPL. On 26 August 2020, he played in the match between Trinbago Knight Riders and the St Lucia Zouks, to become the first ever Indian cricketer to play in the CPL. He had to retire again from Indian cricket in order to take part in the 2020 CPL after he initially withdrew his retirement when he intended to play in 2020 IPL.

== Popular culture ==
A biopic based on his life titled Kaun Pravin Tambe? starring Shreyas Talpade was released on 1 April 2022 on JioHotstar.
