= Bombay Velvet (soundtrack) =

Soundtrack album by Amit Trivedi
- Released: 24 April 2015
- Recorded: 2014–2015
- Venues: Mumbai, Chennai, Prague
- Studios: YRF Studios, A T Studios, Nysa Studio, Raj Jhon Studio, Smecky Music Studios
- Genre: Feature film soundtrack
- Length: 1:07:52
- Language: Hindi
- Label: Zee Music Company
- Producer: Amit Trivedi

Amit Trivedi chronology
Queen (2014)	Bombay Velvet (2015)	Shaandaar (2015)

Bombay Velvet is the soundtrack composed by Amit Trivedi to the 2015 film of the same name directed by Anurag Kashyap starring Ranbir Kapoor and Anushka Sharma. The album featured 10 original songs with lyrics written by Amitabh Bhattacharya and performed by Neeti Mohan, Shefali Alvares, Shalmali Kholgade, Papon, Mohit Chauhan and Trivedi. It also accompanied three instrumentals used in the film score. The album also featured two alternative versions of an original song, compiling over 15 tracks in the album.

Most of the compositions were heavily influenced in jazz music, as Trivedi wanted to introduce the genre to the contemporary Indian audiences who were unfamiliar with the genre. To achieve this, he researched on jazz music over a year and took two more years to sketch the basic compositions. Later, he recorded the songs and the score during 2014 and 2015 in India and Czech Republic, taking nearly four years for the film's music. The soundtrack was released by the record label Zee Music Company on 24 April 2015.

Although the film was a critical and commercial disappointment, the soundtrack was critically acclaimed often regarded as one of the best Hindi film albums of that year and decade, as well as one of Trivedi's best works in his career.

== Background ==
Bombay Velvet is Trivedi's second collaboration with Kashyap after his critically acclaimed work for Dev.D (2009). Trivedi agreed to score music for the film after he liked the script which had scope for jazz music. As contemporary Indian audience were not well versed with jazz music, Trivedi felt that the soundtrack was an experiment for them. At a Reddit AMA session, Kashyap said that the film's music would reflect the jazz era of 1960s Hindi film music, taking excerpts from how C. Ramchandra and Shankar–Jaikishan integrated jazz in their music during that time. While most of the melodies are indigenous to suit the contemporary audience's taste, the basic essence was authentic jazz which he felt it as a combination of two worlds—"the big band jazz with its Afro-American origins combined with the Hindi film music". Amitabh Bhattacharya recalled that Kashyap insisted him to write the songs in a language that can be instantly identified with, demanding the 1960s songwriting techniques by Sahir Ludhianvi, Shailendra and Anand Bakshi.

Trivedi described Bombay Velvet as a "good old fashioned Hindi album" where the songs need its own time and have been seamlessly woven into the storytelling, and not all the songs would be an instant success. The song "Behroopia" was edited from the film, as according to Trivedi, the people who were closely associated in the film and the marketing department found the soundtrack to be influenced with too much jazz and producers suggested him to make a romantic song that could be relevant with the current audience. Hence, he composed the song "Behroopia" as a "modern romantic number".

== Production ==
Trivedi spent a year over researching jazz and its influences in the film and started sketching basic compositions in mid-2012 and 2013 implementing the nuances of jazz in the score and listened to standard and classic jazz music to imbibe that feel. When Trivedi was touring in United States, Kashyap asked him to go to New Orleans which was the hub for jazz music having a variety of jazz genres. However, both of them went against it as recording in that state would have been expensive. Instead, he recorded the music in Prague with a big band orchestra of around 100 musicians performing the score and collaborated with session musicians who worked with several Hollywood musicians. The recording was also happened in Mumbai and Chennai with jazz drummer Gino Banks performed more than five songs in the background.

For the vocals, Trivedi had several singers for the female protagonist before finalising the cast. When Sharma came onboard, he instantly associated with Neeti Mohan as the background singer, because she earlier sang "Jiya Re" composed by A. R. Rahman for Jab Tak Hai Jaan (2012) which also starred Sharma. Trivedi felt Neeti had a "vibrant voice" that would seamlessly suit Sharma's screen presence. However, he described the recording process was quite tough as they went through numerous workshops and music sessions so that she could "live with the songs".

Besides Trivedi, Mikey McCleary also contributed to the music. He was suggested by the film's producers, to produce a "catchy, commercial, upbeat version" of the song "Mohabbat Buri Bimari", originally composed by Trivedi. His version was sung by Shalmali Kholgade. He recreated the track "Jaata Kahaan Hai Deewane" from C.I.D. (1956) which was originally composed by O. P. Nayyar and written by Majrooh Sultanpuri as "Fifi" as the original track was removed from the film by the Central Board of Film Certification (CBFC). Kashyap described the use for the song, as "one for the time period, second it fits in perfectly with the opium den atmosphere and the bars visited by Naval officers at the time and RK’s character comes there after the fight to drown his pain in the haze of opium". McCleary said that they demanded an "upbeat" and "dancey" promotional song within the film, as the original song was pretty slow, he curated a "jazzy, swingy, fast" version which was sung by Suman Sridhar.

During post-production, sound designer Kunal Sharma and engineers Sreejesh G. Nair and Justin Jose K. recorded the musical score and soundtrack in 96 kHz Dolby Atmos over the usual 48 kHz to provide more clarity, depth and feel to the film and its music.

== Track listing ==
No.	Title	Singer(s)	Length
1.	"Fifi"	Suman Sridhar	3:16
2.	"Aam Hindustani"	Shefali Alvares	8:52
3.	"Mohabbat Buri Bimari" (Version 1)	Neeti Mohan	4:18
4.	"Mohobbat Buri Bimari" (Version 2)	Shalmali Kholgade	4:19
5.	"Kha Kha Ga"	Neeti Mohan	4:15
6.	"Dhadaam Dhadaam"	Neeti Mohan	5:18
7.	"Naak Pe Gussa"	Neeti Mohan, Amit Trivedi	5:09
8.	"Sylvia"	Neeti Mohan	4:22
9.	"Darbaan"	Papon	3:59
10.	"Shut Up"	Shefali Alvares	4:56
11.	"Behroopia"	Mohit Chauhan, Neeti Mohan	4:51
12.	"The Bombay Velvet Theme"	Instrumental	4:49
13.	"Conspiracy"	Instrumental	3:30
14.	"Tommy Gun"	Instrumental	2:43
15.	"Mohobbat Buri Bimari" (Version 3)	Shefali Alvares	3:15
Total length:			1:07:52

== Reception ==
=== Critical ===
Devesh Sharma writing for Filmfare stated that, "The album won’t appeal to you on first listening. Give it time to grow on you and then you’ll appreciate what Amit Trivedi and his singers and musicians have achieved [...] One can only say that let the music play – and you sure will be rewarded with a rich listening experience." Calling it as a "complete vintage treat", Surabhi Redkar of Koimoi rated the album three stars and said, "The Bombay Velvet album is true to its theme [...] Amit Trivedi does a damn good job at re-creating the 50s era and the Jazz is truly a masterpiece." Kasmin Fernandes of The Times of India gave three-and-a-half out of five saying "Composed like a noir Hollywood musical, the soundtrack is a brave one for these commercially-entrenched times."

Vipin Nair of Music Aloud gave 9 out of 10 stating Trivedi delivers "yet another massive, esoteric soundtrack, this time (mostly) within the confines of jazz music". Karthik Srinivasan of Milliblog wrote "Bombay Velvet eschews Bollywood-style for a more international jazz flavor and comes out as Amit Trivedi’s phenomenal labor of love". Joginder Tuteja of Bollywood Hungama rated the album 2.5 stars stating "The music of Bombay Velvet is pretty much on the expected lines, which means it doesn't really follow Bollywood norms and instead treads a path of its own. While this doesn't necessarily mean that there is a plethora of chartbusters in the offering, the songs seem good enough to fit into the storytelling of the film." Prateek Sur of Bollywood Life gave two stars, calling the music as a "mixed bag" and said that "the music seems more jazzy than giving you that nostalgic feel".

=== Post-release ===
Bombay Velvet's soundtrack did not fare well commercially. This was probably due to the unconventional nature of the compositions and to the fact that the film itself was a box office disappointment. Trivedi eventually felt "heartbroken" as the music did not get its deserved due credit, saying that "People, who understand jazz have taken the music really well. But the ones who did not understand, the music went above their heads. If the film had worked it would've changed the course of jazz scene in the country." He also criticized the producers for not promoting the film's music as they felt it "too jazzy". He still regarded it as one of his personal favourites. Trivedi was nominated for Best Original Music at the 10th Asian Film Awards, the only award he was nominated for the film.

However, the soundtrack featured in several year-ender lists by critics. Karthik Srinivasan's article for The Hindu listed "Mohabbat Buri Bimari" as one of the top five Hindi songs of 2015. He also called the album as "the top Hindi film soundtrack" in his music review round-up for Milliblog, commenting "The variety of tunes recreating the Bombay of yore, demonstrated aptly the kind of ambition Amit set for himself, and he got some phenomenal singers to deliver." Bradley Fernandes of Filmfare ranked "Mohabbat Buri Bimari" in the fifth position as the best Hindi film songs of that year. "Fifi" was listed among NDTV's "Top 10 Bollywood Songs of 2015".

Bombay Velvet's soundtrack was featured in decade-end lists, which includes Devesh Sharma's article for Filmfare, published on World Music Day (21 June 2021), Akshay Manwani's review for Firstpost, Sankhayan Ghosh's review for Film Companion, and Vipin Nair's list for The Hindu. Tatsam Mukherjee's article for Huffington Post about "The Top 20 Bollywood Albums Since 2000" listed the album at number 14. On Vipin Nair's list of "Top 100 Bollywood Albums" for Film Companion, Bombay Velvet was ranked at number 91. It was also regarded at one of Trivedi's best albums.
